= U.S. Route 45 =

Highway in the United States

U.S. Route 45
- US 45 highlighted in red, US 45E in blue, US 45W in magenta

Route information
- Length: 1,297 mi (2,087 km)
- Existed: 1926–present

Major junctions
- South end: US 98 at Mobile, AL
- I-65 at Prichard, AL; I-20 / I-59 at Meridian, MS; I-22 at Tupelo, MS; I-40 at Jackson, TN; I-24 at Paducah, KY; I-64 at Mill Shoals, IL; I-57 / I-70 at Effingham, IL; I-80 at Tinley Park, IL; I-55 at Countryside, IL; I-41 / I-43 / I-94 at Milwaukee, WI
- North end: Ontonagon and River streets in Ontonagon, MI

Location
- Country: United States
- States: Alabama, Mississippi, Tennessee, Kentucky, Illinois, Wisconsin, Michigan

Highway system
- United States Numbered Highway System; List; Special; Divided
← US 44	→ US 46

U.S. Route 45 (US 45) is a major north–south United States highway and a border-to-border route, from Lake Superior to the Gulf of Mexico. A sign at the highway's northern terminus notes the total distance as 1,297 miles (2,087 km).

US 45 is notable for incorporating, in its original alignment, the first paved road in the South, a 49-mile (79 km) segment in Lee County, Mississippi. Let to contract in July 1914, the concrete highway opened on November 15, 1915.

As of 2006, the highway's northern terminus is in Ontonagon, Michigan, at the corner of Ontonagon and River streets, a few blocks from Lake Superior (M-64 formerly terminated there as well until its rerouting in October 2006 to use the newly built Ontonagon River Bridge). US 45's southern terminus is in Mobile, Alabama, at an intersection with US 98.

== Route description ==
=== Alabama ===
US 45 is concurrent with unsigned State Route 17 (SR 17) between Mobile and Vinegar Bend, just north of Deer Park, in Washington County, Alabama. From Vinegar Bend to the Mississippi state line, US 45 is concurrent with unsigned SR 57.

=== Mississippi ===
US 45 is part of a designated hurricane evacuation route in Mississippi. It is entirely four lanes from its point of entry from Alabama, at the town of State Line, to the Tennessee line just north of Corinth, along the way serving the towns of (from south to north) Waynesboro, Meridian, Columbus and Tupelo. US 45 is a freeway in the vicinity of Meridian, from Shannon to Saltillo, and from south of Corinth to the Tennessee state line. Otherwise, it is largely a four-lane limited-access expressway, with the exception of urban arterial sections in Columbus and Aberdeen.

At Brooksville, US 45 splits away from US 45 Alternate (US 45 Alt.) and serves the towns of Columbus and Aberdeen before rejoining US 45 Alt. south of Tupelo. The alternate roadway provides a more direct and entirely four-laned route between Meridian and Tupelo, bypassing Columbus to the west and, more closely, Starkville to the east.

Major junctions of US 45 in Mississippi include US 84 at Waynesboro, Interstate 20/Interstate 59 (I-20/I-59) at Meridian, US 82 at Columbus, I-22/US 78 at Tupelo and US 78 at Corinth. Each of these junctions is an interchange and, with the exception of Columbus and Waynesboro, each is part of a freeway segment.

The Mississippi section of U.S. 45 is defined at Mississippi Code Annotated § 65-3-3.

=== Tennessee ===
==== Southern section ====
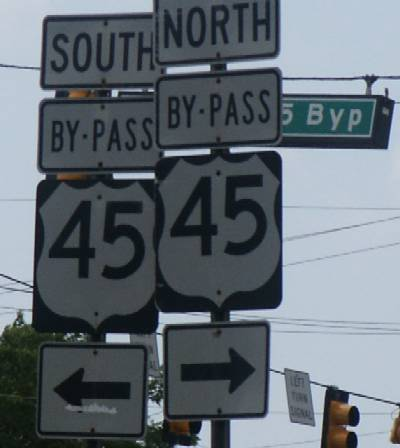
US 45 Bypass signage in Jackson, Tennessee

From the Mississippi state line, US 45 extends north past the cities of Guys, Eastview, Selmer, Bethel Springs, Finger, Henderson, Pinson, and Jackson to Three Way, where the highway splits into US 45W and US 45E.

==== US 45W and US 45E ====
U.S. Route 45W
- Location: Three Way-South Fulton, Tennessee
- Length: 62.33 mi (100.31 km)

US 45W is a 62.33-mile-long (100.31 km) state highway in West Tennessee, connecting Jackson with South Fulton via Humboldt, Trenton, Dyer, Rutherford, Kenton, and Union City. For the majority of its length, it is concurrent with unsigned State Route 5 (SR 5).

U.S. Route 45E
- Location: Three Way-South Fulton, Tennessee
- Length: 61.23 mi (98.54 km)

US 45E is a 61.23-mile-long (98.54 km) state highway in West Tennessee, connecting Jackson with South Fulton via Medina, Milan, Bradford, Greenfield, Sharon, and Martin. For the majority of its length, it is concurrent with unsigned SR 43 for most of the route's length except for short segments at Martin and South Fulton, where it is cosigned with SR 216 and SR 215 respectively.

==== Northern section ====
Mainline US 45, concurrent with unsigned SR 3, goes northeast and passes through neighborhoods in South Fulton along Chickasaw Drive before turning north onto Highland Drive at an intersection with Kentucky Route 116 (KY 116, W State Line Street) at the western edge of downtown. US 45 then crosses into Kentucky and the city of Fulton.

=== Kentucky ===
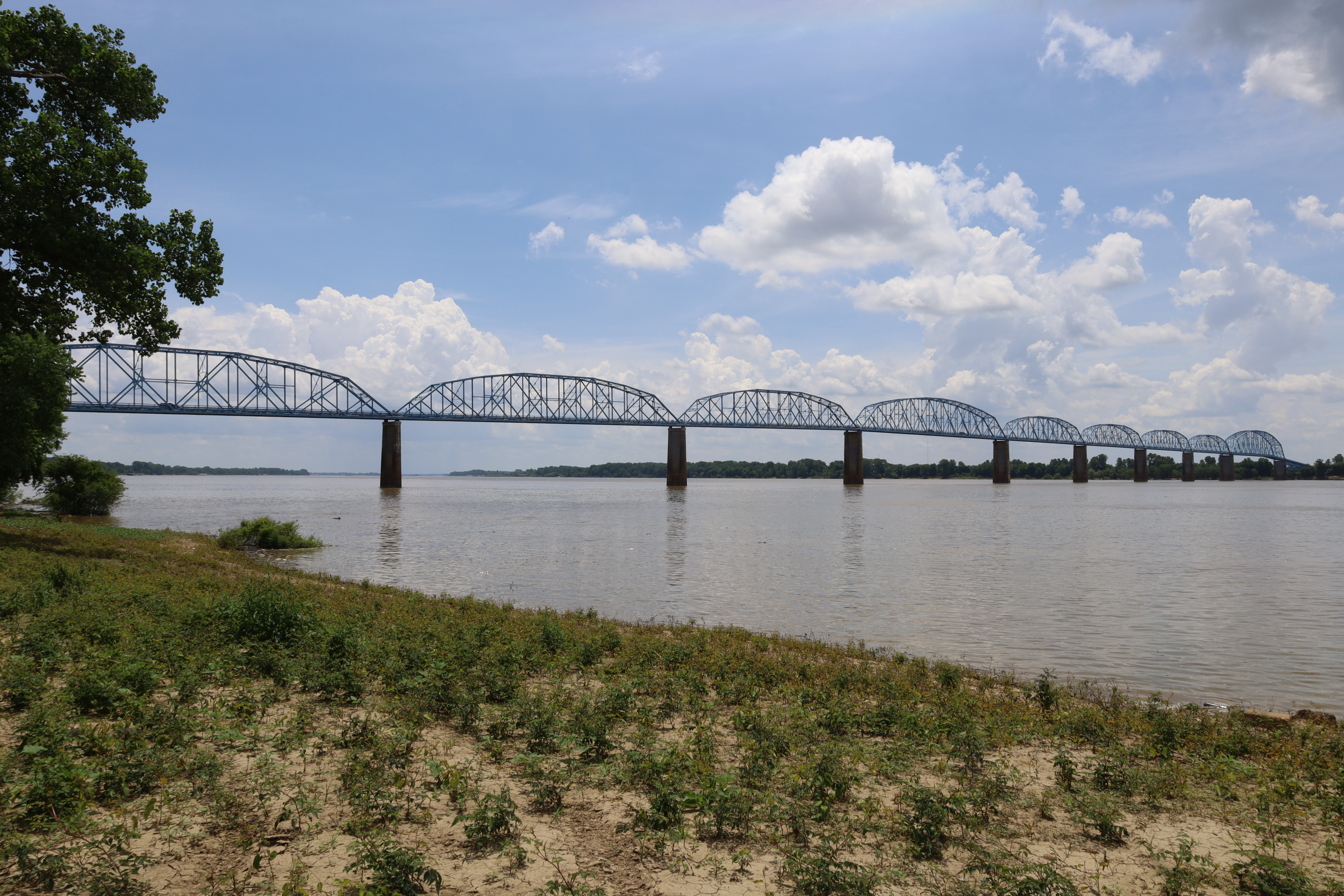
US 45 crossing the Ohio River on the Brookport Bridge

US 45 enters Kentucky at Fulton then northeast past Mayfield then heads directly north into Paducah as a four-lane highway. In Paducah, US 45 serves as a major artery, intersecting with I-24 at exit 7, and intersecting US 60 and US 62. US 45 leaves Kentucky from Paducah's northern border across the two-lane, metal-grate Brookport Bridge to Brookport, Illinois, across the Ohio River.

=== Illinois ===
In the state of Illinois, US 45 runs from a bridge across the Ohio River from Paducah, Kentucky, through Shawnee National Forest and north to the Wisconsin border east of Antioch, Illinois. With a length of 428.99 miles (690.39 km) in Illinois, US 45 is the longest numbered route in Illinois.

In its progress north from the Ohio River US 45 first joins I-24 as far as Vienna then heads northeast through Harrisburg and Eldorado in Saline County and north through Fairfield, Flora, Effingham, Mattoon, Champaign, Urbana, Gilman and Kankakee, then straight north through the western suburbs of Chicago in Will County, Cook County and Lake County to the Wisconsin border.

=== Wisconsin ===
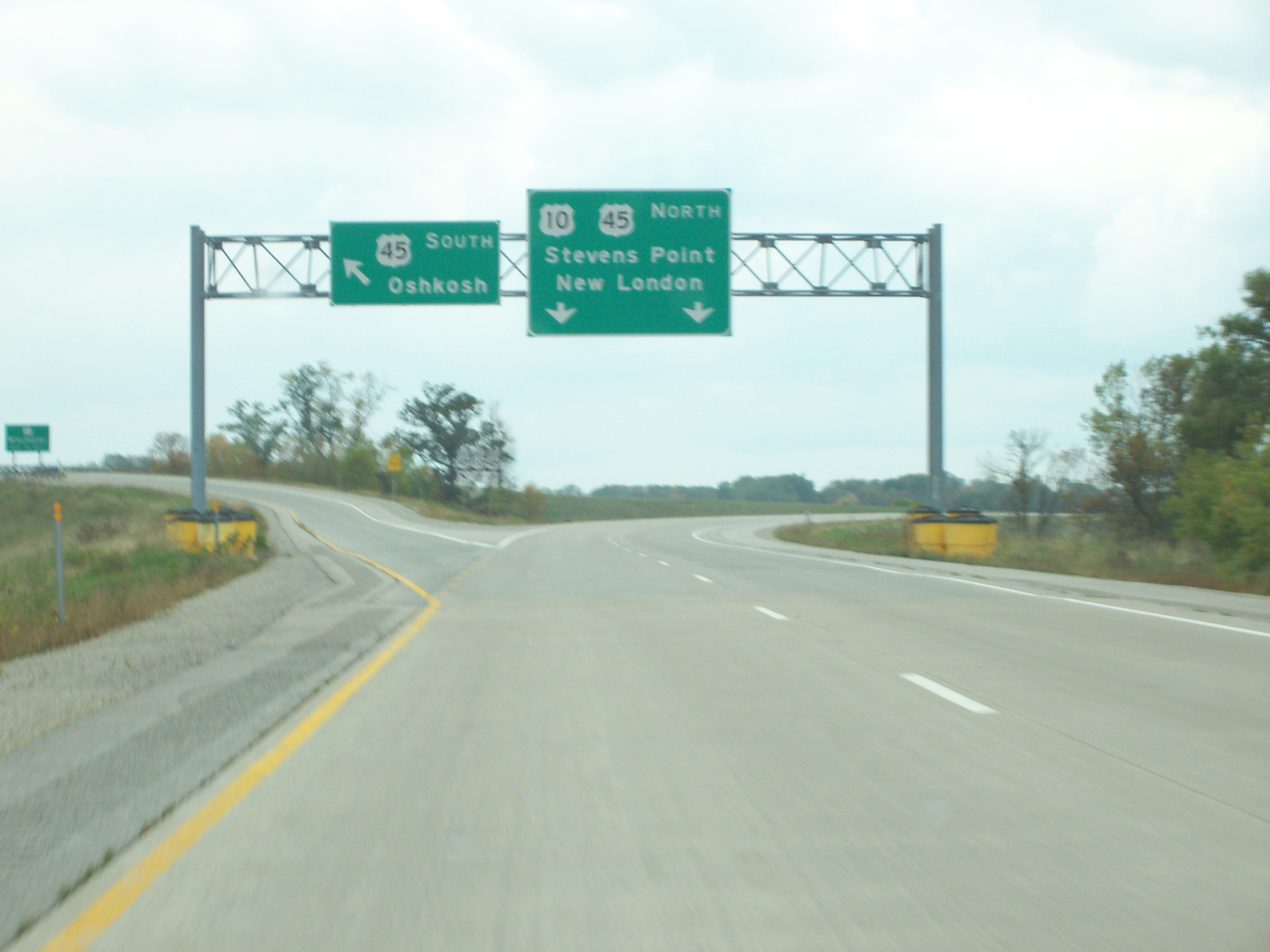
The highway near Oshkosh

US 45 enters the state in southeast Wisconsin. It runs concurrently with I-894 and US 41 through the west side of metro Milwaukee to form a major artery through the metropolitan area. It runs north to Fond du Lac. The highway routes near the western shore of Lake Winnebago through Oshkosh, Wisconsin. US 45 then travels north through Wittenberg, Antigo, and Eagle River, as well as the state and national forests, until it leaves the state at Land O' Lakes and enters Michigan.

=== Michigan ===
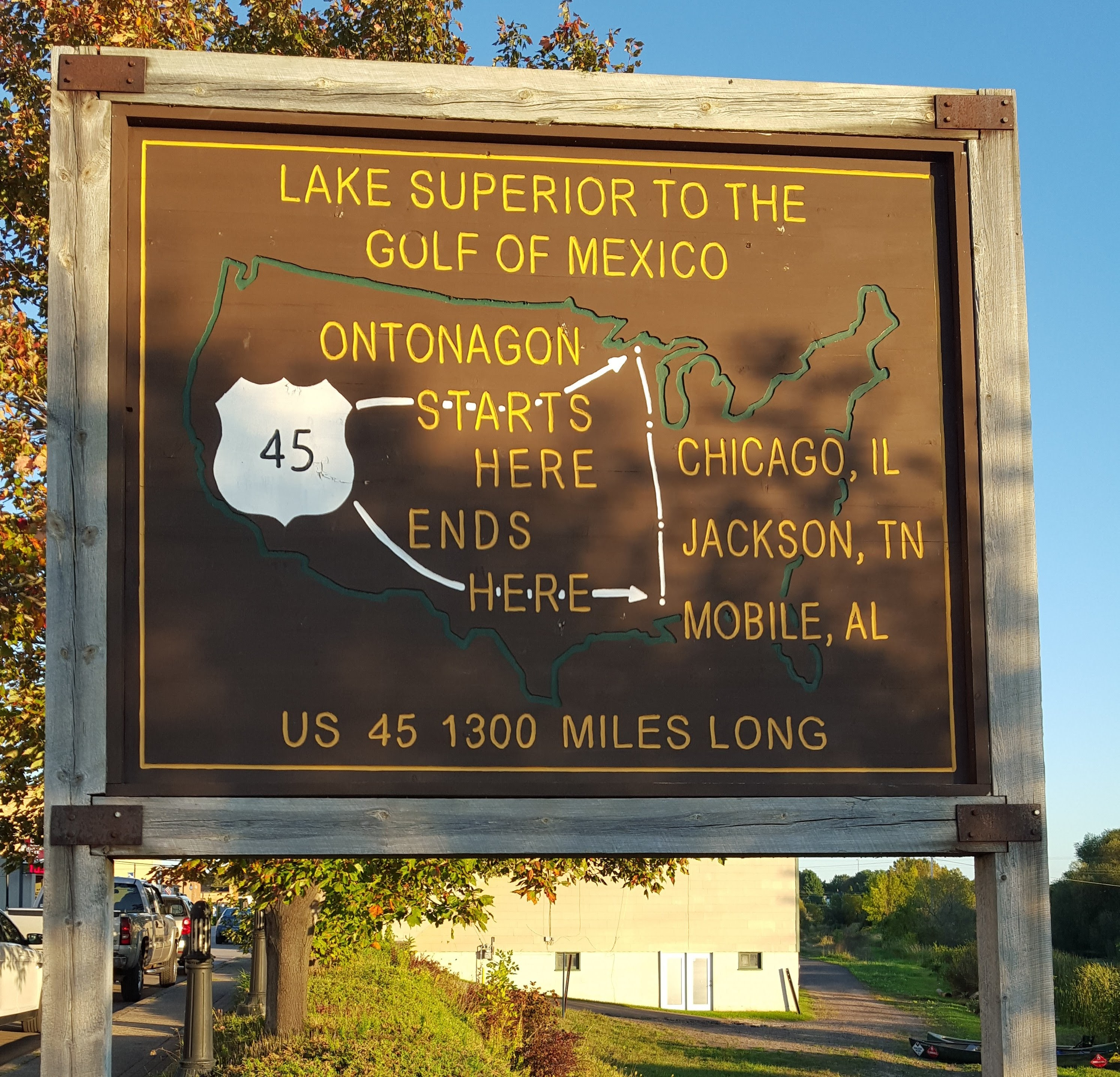
Northern terminus of US 45, Ontonagon

US 45 enters Michigan south of Watersmeet. From there, the highway crosses the Western Upper Peninsula through the Ottawa National Forest running north to Ontonagon. US 45 ends just south of Lake Superior in downtown Ontonagon. The terminus was not changed in 2006 despite realignment then of M-38 and M-64 from the terminus to a crossing 0.7 miles (1.1 km) south.

== History ==
Until March 1935, US 45's northern terminus was at US 12 in Des Plaines, Illinois, near Chicago.

Prior to the construction of the Interstate Highway System, US 45 was one of the main routes south out of Chicago toward New Orleans. Much of the traffic left US 45 at Effingham, Illinois, continuing on through Cairo, Illinois along Illinois Route 37.

== Future ==
In 2023, an effort began to improve US 45 in Tupelo, Mississippi. A $112 million plan to straighten US 45 at McCullough Boulevard, Hilda Avenue and Front Street in a series of interchanges to solve congestion and safety issues in this area. In additions to these improvements, Mississippi Senator Roger Wicker requested $5 million for the 2023 fiscal year to fund preconstruction activities that would upgrade the existing substandard US 45 freeway to interstate standards between Tupelo and Shannon, Mississippi. The potential Interstate spur, which would be an auxiliary route of I-22, is currently listed as High Priority Corridor 95.

== Major intersections ==
Southern segment

Alabama
US 98 in Mobile
I-65 in Prichard
Mississippi
US 84 in Waynesboro
I-20 / I-59 in Meridian
US 11 / US 80 in Meridian
US 82 west of Columbus. The highways travel concurrently to Columbus.
US 278 north-northwest of New Wren. The highways travel concurrently to the Verona–Tupelo city line.
I-22 / US 78 in Tupelo
US 72 in Corinth
Tennessee
US 64 in Selmer. The highways travel concurrently through the city.
I-40 / US 412 in Jackson
US 45E / US 45W in Three Way
US 79 in Milan ( US 45E)
US 79 in Humboldt ( US 45W)

Northern segment

Tennessee
US 45E / US 45W / US 51 in South Fulton. US 45 / US 51 travel concurrently to Fulton, Kentucky.
Kentucky
Future I-69 north of Mayfield
I-24 in Paducah
US 62 in Paducah. The highways travel concurrently through the city.
US 60 / US 62 in Paducah. US 45/US 60 travels concurrently through the city.
Illinois
I-24 in Metropolis
I-24 north-northeast of Vienna
I-64 north of Mill Shoals
US 50 east of Flora. The highways travel concurrently to northwest of Flora.
US 40 in Effingham. The highways travel concurrently through the city.
I-57 / I-70 in Effingham
I-57 northeast of Neoga
I-57 in Mattoon
US 36 in Tuscola Township
I-57 in Pesotum
US 150 in Champaign. The highways travel concurrently to Urbana.
I-74 in Urbana
US 136 in Rantoul
US 24 in Gilman. The highways travel concurrently through the city.
US 52 east of Ashkum. The highways travel concurrently to Peotone Township.
I-57 in Kankakee
US 30 in Frankfort
I-80 on the Mokena–Orland Park–Tinley Park city line
US 6 in Orland Park
US 12 / US 20 west of the Palos Hills–Hickory Hills city line. US 12/US 45 travels concurrently to Des Plaines. US 20/US 45 travels concurrently to the Stone Park–Melrose Park city line.
I-294 in Willow Springs
I-55 on the Countryside–Hodgkins city line
US 34 in La Grange
I-290 on the Westchester–Hillside–Bellwood city line
I-190 west of Rosemont
US 14 in Des Plaines
Wisconsin
I-43 in Greenfield. The highways are concurrent for a 1/2 mile.
I-41 / US 41 / I-894 in Greenfield. I-41 and US-41 stay concurrent until Richfield. I-894 stays concurrent to the Milwaukee-Wauwatosa city line.
I-94 in Milwaukee.
US 18 in Wauwatosa.
US 151 in the Town of Fond du Lac
I-41 / US 41 in Oshkosh
US 10 in Winchester. The highways travel concurrently for 3 miles.
US 8 in Monico. The highways travel concurrently through the town.
Michigan
US 2 in Watersmeet
River Street/Chippewa Street in Ontonagon

== See also ==
- U.S. Route 45 Business in Wittenburg, Wisconsin
- U.S. Route 45 Business in New London, Wisconsin
- U.S. Route 45 Business in Paducah, Kentucky
- U.S. Route 45 Bypass in Jackson, Tennessee
- U.S. Route 45W Business in Trenton, Tennessee; decommissioned and re-signed as State Route 367
- U.S. Route 45W Business in Humboldt, Tennessee
- U.S. Route 45E Business in Martin, Tennessee
- U.S. Route 45 Business in Tupelo, Mississippi
- U.S. Route 45 Alternate in Brooksville, Mississippi and Shannon, Mississippi

Browse numbered routes
← MS 44	MS	→ MS 46
