= Tennessee State Route 431 =

State highway in Tennessee, United States

State Route 431
- TN 431 highlighted in red

Route information
- Maintained by TDOT
- Length: 16.58 mi (26.68 km)

Major junctions
- South end: Future I-169 / US 45E / SR 22 southeast of Martin
- US 45W / SR 5 in Union City
- North end: US 51 in Union City

Location
- Country: United States
- State: Tennessee
- Counties: Weakley, Obion

Highway system
- Tennessee State Routes; Interstate; US; State
← US 431	→ SR 433

State Route 431 (SR 431) is a 16.58-mile-long (26.68 km) secondary state highway in the northwestern part of the U.S. state of Tennessee.

== Route description ==
SR 431 travels southeast to northwest from just southeast of Martin in Weakley County to just east of Union City in Obion County.

SR 431 is known in Martin west of the downtown area as University Avenue. The campus of the University of Tennessee at Martin is located along University Avenue, which divides it into the main campus area and the agriculture campus, where the football stadium, ROTC, and the rodeo pavilion are located. The Martin Walmart and the communities of Gardner and Midway are also located along this highway, as is an access road to Everett-Stewart Regional Airport.

== History ==
SR 431 is the original alignment of SR 22, a primary state highway. It was replaced with the current four-lane divided, access-controlled section which now parallels the former route to the north. The old portion was then designated SR 431.

== Major intersections ==
County	Location	mi	km	Destinations	Notes
Weakley	Martin	0.0	0.0	US 45E / SR 22 (SR 216 west) – Milan, Union City, South Fulton	Southern terminus; interchange; eastern terminus of unsigned SR 216
Weakley	Martin	2.9	4.7	US 45E Bus. north (Lindell Street)	Southern end of US 45E Business wrong-way concurrency
Weakley	Martin	3.2	5.1	US 45E Bus. south (Elm Street)	Northern end of US 45E Business wrong-way concurrency
Weakley	Martin	4.3	6.9	SR 43 (Skyhawk Parkway) – South Fulton, Sharon, Greenfield	
Weakley	Martin	5.2	8.4	To; SR 22 north – Union City	Interchange; No access to SR 22 south
Obion		12.6	20.3	To SR 22 – Union City, Martin	Interchange
Obion	Union City	14.9	24.0	US 45W north (Miles Avenue/SR 184 north) – South Fulton	Southern end of US 45W/SR 184 wrong-way concurrency
Obion	Union City	15.8	25.4	US 45W south / SR 5 (First Street) – Downtown, Woodland Mills, Trenton	Northern end of US 45W wrong-way concurrency
Obion	Union City	16.58	26.68	US 51 (Reelfoot Avenue/Everett Boulevard/SR 3/SR 184 south) – South Fulton, Troy, Dyersburg	Northern terminus; northern end of unsigned SR 184 wrong-way concurrency
1.000 mi = 1.609 km; 1.000 km = 0.621 mi: Concurrency terminus; Incomplete access
