= Tennessee State Route 5 =

State highway in Tennessee, United States

State Route 5
- SR 5; secondary in blue, unsigned in green

Route information
- Maintained by TDOT
- Length: 120 mi (190 km)
- Existed: October 1, 1923–present

Major junctions
- South end: US 45 at the Mississippi state line near Corinth, MS
- US 64 in Selmer; US 45 Byp. / US 70 / US 412 Bus. in Jackson; I-40 / US 412 in Jackson; US 45W / US 45E in Three Way; US 70A / US 79 in Humboldt; US 45W / SR 21 in Union City; US 51 / SR 22 in Union City; Future I-69 / SR 690 in Union City
- North end: KY 125 north-northwest of Woodland Mills

Location
- Country: United States
- State: Tennessee
- Counties: McNairy, Chester, Madison, Gibson, Obion

Highway system
- Tennessee State Routes; Interstate; US; State
← SR 4	→ SR 6

State Route 5 (SR 5) is a 120-mile-long (190 km) north–south state highway in the western part of the U.S. state of Tennessee. Except for the section northwest of Union City, it is entirely concurrent with U.S. Route 45 (US 45) and US 45W.

== Route description ==
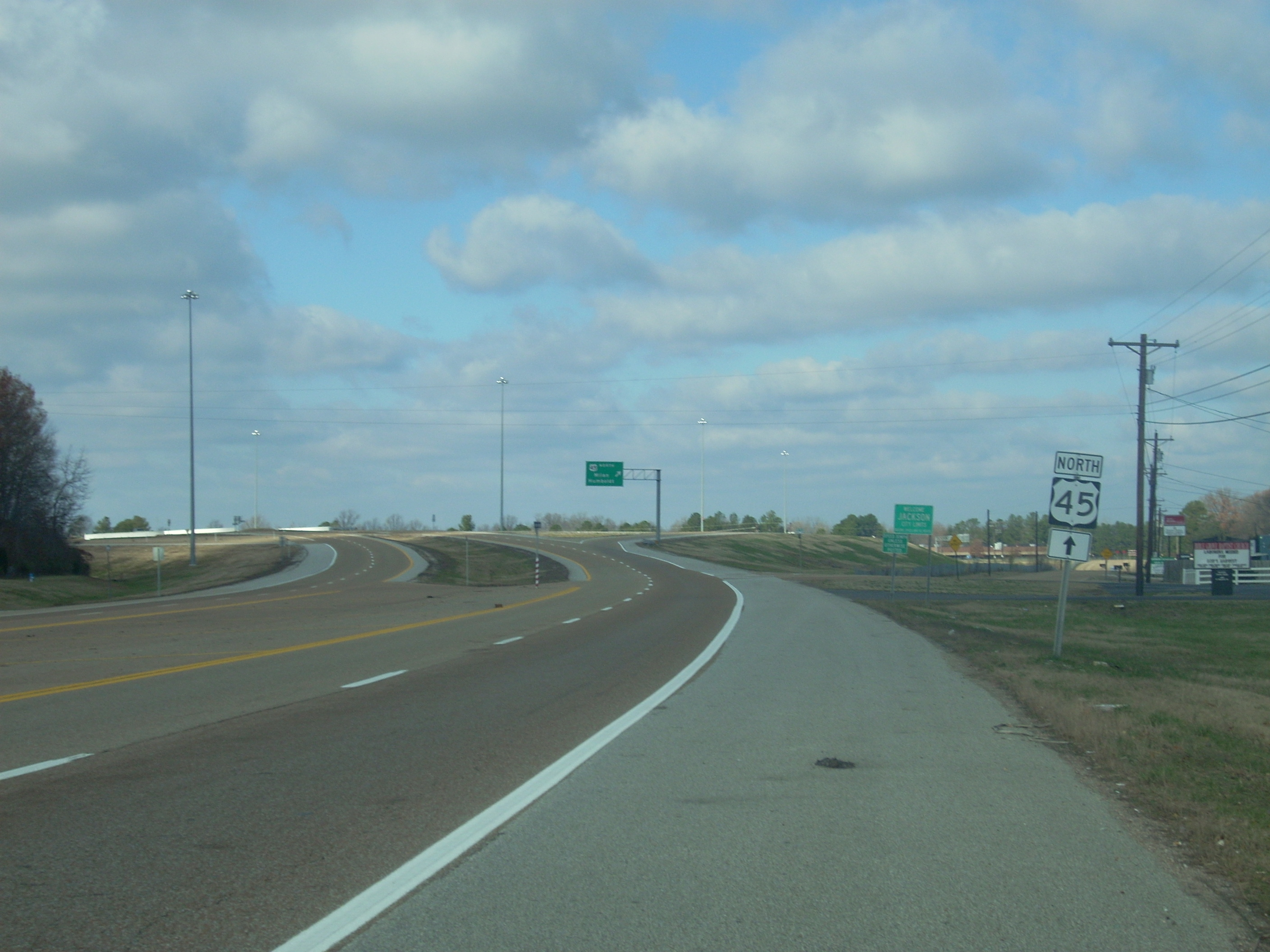
View of US 45/SR 5 in north Jackson, Interchange in background is the northern terminus of US 45 Bypass in Jackson

=== McNairy County ===
SR 5 begins in McNairy County as the hidden designation for US 45 at the Mississippi state line just north of Corinth. The highway goes north as a 4-lane divided highway to an intersection with Old US Highway 45 S (a connector to MS 145), where it narrows to an undivided 4-lane and passes through the town of Guys. US 45/SR 5 then pass through Eastview, where they have an intersection with SR 57, before having an intersection with SR 142 and entering Selmer. US 45/SR 5 passes through a business district before coming to an intersection with US 64/SR 15 and US 64 Business (US 64 Bus.), where US 45/SR 5 turns left to become concurrent with US 64/SR 15. They bypass downtown along the western side as a divided highway before coming to an interchange US 64 Bus. at the northern edge of town, where US 64/SR 15 split off and US 45/SR 5 leave Selmer and continue north. They pass through Bethel Springs before passing through rural areas to have an intersection with SR 199 in Finger. The highway then crosses in Chester County.

=== Chester County ===
US 45/SR 5 continue north through rural areas before entering Henderson and having an interchange with SR 100. The highway has an intersection with SR 365 before bypassing downtown to the west. US 45/SR 5 then has another intersection with SR 365 before leaving Henderson and continuing northwest to cross into Madison County.

=== Madison County ===
US 45/SR 5 pass through Pinson, where it has an intersection with SR 197, before passing through rural areas to enter the city of Jackson, where the road narrows to an undivided 4-lane highway known as S Highland Avenue. It has an intersection with SR 18 (Bolivar Highway) before passing through residential areas. It then passes through a wooded area to cross a bridge over the South Fork of the Forked Deer River to enter downtown, where it comes to an intersection with US 70/SR 1 and US 45 Byp./SR 186 (E/W Chester Street). US 45/SR 5 becomes N Highland Avenue as it passes through downtown before entering residential areas and coming to an intersection with US 412 Bus./SR 20 (North Parkway) at Old Hickory Mall. US 45/SR 5 passes through a business district before having a single-point urban interchange with I-40/US 412 (Exit 82). The highway continues north through residential areas before leaving Jackson and coming to an interchange with the north end of US 45 Byp., where it becomes concurrent with unsigned SR 186. US 45/SR 5/SR 186 go north as a 4-lane divided highway to cross a bridge over the Middle Fork of the Forked Deer River to enter Three Way and to an interchange at the split of US 45 into US 45W and US 45E. Here SR 186 goes north along US 45E/SR 43 while SR 5 follows US 45W. US 45W/SR 5 then cross into Gibson County.

=== Gibson County ===
The highway enters Humboldt and comes to an intersection with US 45W Bus., where SR 5 breaks away from US 45W to follow US 45W Bus. while US 45W follows SR 366. They go northwest as an undivided 4-lane known as E Main Street to pass through residential areas before narrowing to 2-lanes and becomes concurrent with US 70A/US 79/SR 76 (Eastend Drive). They enter downtown together before splitting there, with US 70A/US 79/SR 76 continuing on W Main Street while US 45W Bus./SR 5 go north along N Central Avenue. They leave downtown and have an intersection with SR 152 (E Mitchell Street) before passing through a residential area. US 45W Bus./SR 5 then pass through a business district before US 45W Bus. ends at an intersection with US 45W/US 70A Byp./US 79 Byp./SR 366, where US 45W turns north to become concurrent with SR 5 again as they leave Humboldt and continue north. US 45W/SR 5 becomes a 4-lane divided highway before passing through Fruitland, where it has an intersection with SR 420 before passing through rural areas. It then enters Trenton at an intersection with SR 457 and SR 367, where US 45W/SR 5 turn right to follow a 2-lane bypass of downtown on the eastern side. The highway becomes concurrent with SR 54 before having another intersection with SR 186 in a business district before having an intersection with SR 77 and SR 104, where it becomes concurrent with SR 77, in a more rural part of town. SR 54 then splits off before the highway curves to the west to have another intersection with SR 367. US 45W/SR 5/SR 77 then widen to a 4-lane divided highway to curve back northward and leave Trenton. They wind their way north through farmland to pass through Dyer, where it bypasses the town on its west side, to have an interchange with SR 185, where SR 77 splits off and goes west. US 45W/SR 5 continue north to pass through Rutherford, where it bypasses the town on its west side, and has an interchange with SR 105. US 45W/SR 5 then narrows to 2-lanes as it has an intersection with its former alignment just before entering Kenton and crossing into Obion County.

=== Obion County ===
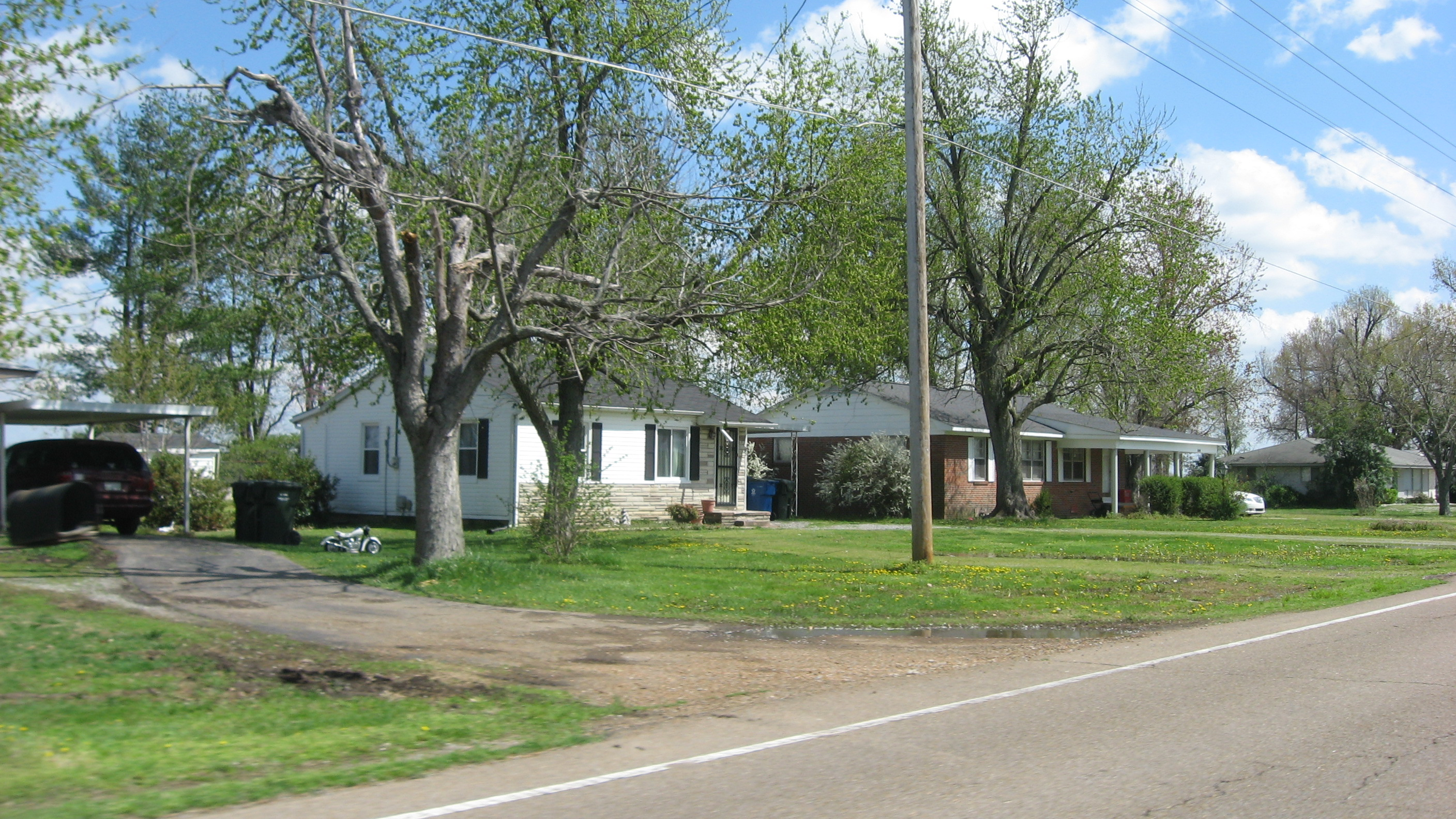
Houses on the eastern side of Thompson Street (SR 5) south of the Jones Street intersection in Woodland Mills, Tennessee

US 45W/SR 5 have a short concurrency with SR 89 before leaving Kenton and continuing north. The highway passes through a wooded area to cross a bridge over the Obion River before passing through farmland to become concurrent with SR 21. They then have an intersection with SR 216 just west of Rives before continuing north to enter Union City and come to an intersection with SR 431/SR 184 (W/E Reelfoot Avenue), where US 45W splits and turns right onto SR 431/SR 184. SR 5 becomes a fully signed secondary highway and follows First Street through some neighborhoods before entering downtown and coming to an intersection with Main Street, where SR 21 turns right onto Main Street while SR 5 turns left onto Main Street. SR 5 continues west through downtown before coming to an intersection with US 51/SR 3 (Jere B. Ford Memorial Highway), where SR 5 becomes concurrent with SR 22. They go west past some businesses before passing through the diamond interchange with SR 690 (Future I-69). At an intersection with Old Lake Road, SR 22 turns west toward Samburg. SR 5 continues northwest to leave Union City and continue north through rural areas to pass through Woodland Mills before coming to the Kentucky state line, where the road continues north as Kentucky Route 125 (KY 125).

The signed portion of SR 5 exists entirely within Obion County and is approximately 7.8 miles (12.6 km) in length.

== History ==
Several old alignments (most are two-lane) of SR 5 exist throughout the state with the most notable examples being near the Mississippi state line, a section of Old Highway 45 between Bethel Springs and Selmer, SR 367 through Trenton, and a long stretch of old highway between Trenton and Rutherford.

Originally, SR 5 north of Trenton followed a much different route from the current alignment. From Trenton, SR 5 bent to the northeast, following the old Dresden Road as far as Greenfield, where it turned north and roughly followed the present-day SR 43. As evidenced by road maps published by the National Map Company and Rand McNally, sometime between 1927 and 1935, SR 5 was rerouted to follow the former SR 41 north to Kenton and on to Union City.

== Future ==
TDOT has proposed widening SR 5 in Obion County as part of The 2008-2010 Transportation Improvement Program. Right-of-way acquisition was slated to begin in FY 2008 on a section of SR 5 from Troy Station Road to Allie Campbell Road and in FY 2010 for the section between Allie Campbell Road and SR 22. This will leave a two-lane section of SR 5 from Rutherford, Tennessee to a point just north of the Obion River.

== Major intersections ==
County	Location	mi	km	Destinations	Notes
McNairy	Guys	0.0	0.0	US 45 south – Corinth	Southern end of US 45 concurrency; continuation beyond Mississippi state line
McNairy	Eastview	5.7	9.2	SR 57 – Counce, Memphis	Provides access to Shiloh National Park & Pickwick Landing State Park
McNairy	Selmer	10.3	16.6	SR 142 east – Stantonville	Western terminus of SR 142
McNairy	Selmer	11.6	18.7	US 64 Bus. west / US 64 east (East Poplar Avenue/SR 15) – Savannah	Southern end of US 64 concurrency; US 64 Bus. continues west through downtown Selmer
McNairy	Selmer	16.9	27.2	US 64 Bus. east / US 64 west (Cherry Avenue/SR 15) – Memphis	Northern end of US 64 concurrency; interchange; US 64 Bus. continues east through downtown Selmer
McNairy	Finger	29.0	46.7	SR 199 east (Finger-Leapwood Road) – Finger	Western terminus of SR 199
Chester	Henderson	34.5	55.5	SR 100 – Whiteville, Decaturville	Interchange
Chester	Henderson	34.8	56.0	SR 365 north (Main Street) – Henderson	Southern terminus of SR 365
Chester	Henderson	37.2	59.9	SR 365 south (White Avenue) – Henderson	Northern terminus of SR 365
Madison	Pinson	40.6	65.3	SR 197 east (Ozier Road) – Pinson	Western terminus of SR 197; provides access to Pinson Mounds, Beech Bluff & Mifflin
Madison	Jackson	47.5	76.4	SR 18 south (Bolivar Highway) – Bolivar	Northern terminus of SR 18
Madison	Jackson			Northern end of primary designation and southern end of secondary designation	
Madison	Jackson	51.4	82.7	US 45 Byp. north / US 70 (Chester Street/SR 1/SR 186)	Southern terminus of US 45 Bypass and unsigned SR 186; provides access to McKellar-Sipes Regional Airport
Madison	Jackson	54.4	87.5	US 412 Bus. (North Parkway/SR 20)	
Madison	Jackson	55.7	89.6	I-40 / US 412 – Memphis, Nashville	I-40 exits 82 A/B
Madison	Jackson	60.6	97.5	US 45 Byp. south (Keith Short Bypass/SR 186) – Jackson	Northern terminus of US 45 Bypass; interchange; southern end of unsigned SR 186 concurrency
Madison	Jackson			Northern end of secondary designation and southern end of primary designation	
Madison	Three Way	62.4	100.4	US 45W north / US 45E north (SR 43/SR 186) – Humboldt, Milan	US 45 splits into US 45W and US 45E; interchange; southern terminus of unsigned SR 43; northern end of unsigned SR 186 concurrency; southern end of US 45W concurrency
Gibson	Humboldt	66.5	107.0	US 45W Bus. north / US 45W north (SR 366)	Southern end of US 45W Bus. concurrency; northern end of US 45W concurrency; eastern terminus of unsigned SR 366; northern end of primary designation and southern end of secondary designation
Gibson	Humboldt	68.0	109.4	US 70A east / US 79 north (22nd Avenue/SR 76)	Southern end of US 70A/US 79 concurrency
Gibson	Humboldt	68.4	110.1	US 70A west / US 79 south (Main Street/SR 76)	Northern end of US 70A/US 79 concurrency
Gibson	Humboldt	68.7	110.6	SR 152 (Mitchell Street)	
Gibson	Humboldt	69.6	112.0	US 45W south (SR 366) / US 70A Byp. / US 79 Byp.	Northern terminus of US 45W Bus.; southern end of US 45W concurrency; northern end of secondary designation and southern end of primary designation
Gibson	Fruitland	73.3	118.0	SR 420 east – Gibson	Western terminus of SR 420
Gibson	Trenton	76.9	123.8	SR 457 west / SR 367 north (S College Street) – Dyersburg, Trenton	Eastern terminus of SR 457; Southern terminus of SR 367
Gibson	Trenton	78.9	127.0	SR 54 south (Armory Street) – Alamo	Southern end of unsigned SR 54 concurrency
Gibson	Trenton	79.3	127.6	SR 186 south (Gibson Road) – Gibson	Northern terminus of SR 186
Gibson	Trenton	79.9	128.6	SR 104 / SR 77 east (E Eaton Street) – Dyersburg, Milan	Southern end of unsigned SR 77 concurrency
Gibson	Trenton	81.3	130.8	SR 54 north (Halliburton Street) – Bradford	Northern end of unsigned SR 54 concurrency
Gibson	Trenton	82.4	132.6	SR 367 south (N College Street) – Trenton	Northern terminus of SR 367
Gibson	Dyer	87.9	141.5	SR 77 west (Yorkville Street) / SR 185 east – Yorkville, Dyer	Northern end of unsigned SR 77 concurrency; interchange; western terminus of SR 185
Gibson	Rutherford	91.7	147.6	SR 105 (McKnight Street) – Trimble, Bradford	Interchange
Gibson				Northern end of expressway	
Obion	Kenton	97.3	156.6	SR 89 (E College Street/E Church Street) – Trimble, Sharon	Short SR 89 concurrency
Obion		107.9	173.6	SR 21 west (Troy-Rives Road) – Troy	Southern end of SR 21 concurrency
Obion		109.0	175.4	SR 216 east (Pleasant Hill Road) – Rives	Western terminus of SR 216
Obion	Union City	112.9	181.7	US 45W north / SR 431 (Reelfoot Avenue/SR 184)	Northern end of US 45W concurrency; northern end of unsigned primary designation and southern end of signed secondary designation
Obion	Union City	113.7	183.0	SR 21 east (E Main Street)	Northern end of SR 21 concurrency
Obion	Union City	114.3	183.9	US 51 / SR 22 south (Jere B. Ford Memorial Highway/SR 3)	Southern end of SR 22 concurrency
Obion	Union City	115.1	185.2	SR 690 / Future I-69	Diamond interchange; opened to traffic in February 2024
Obion	Union City	115.5	185.9	SR 22 north (Old Lake Road) – Tiptonville, Samburg	Northern end of SR 22 concurrency; to Reelfoot Lake State Park
Obion		120.0	193.1	KY 125 north – Hickman	Continuation into Kentucky
1.000 mi = 1.609 km; 1.000 km = 0.621 mi: Concurrency terminus

== See also ==
- List of highways numbered 5
