= U.S. Route 45 in Tennessee =

U.S. Highway in Tennessee

U.S. Route 45
- US 45 highlighted in red, and US 45W and US 45E in blue

Route information
- Maintained by TDOT

Southern segment
- Length: 60.95 mi (98.09 km)
- South end: US 45 at the Mississippi state line in Guys
- Major intersections: SR 57 in Eastview; US 64 in Selmer; SR 100 in Henderson; SR 18 in Jackson; US 45 Byp. / US 70 in Jackson; I-40 / US 412 in Jackson
- North end: US 45W / US 45E in Three Way

Northern segment
- Length: 0.45 mi (720 m)
- South end: US 45W / US 45E / US 51 in South Fulton
- North end: US 45 at the Kentucky state line in South Fulton

Location
- Country: United States
- State: Tennessee
- Counties: McNairy, Chester, Madison; Obion

Highway system
- United States Numbered Highway System; List; Special; Divided; Tennessee State Routes; Interstate; US; State
| ← SR 44 | → US 45E |

U.S. Route 45 (US 45) in Tennessee extends from the Mississippi state line to the Kentucky state line in West Tennessee, passing through the cities of Selmer, Henderson, Jackson, and South Fulton. Between Three Way and South Fulton, the highway is split into US 45W and US 45E.

== Route description ==
=== Southern section ===
From the Mississippi state line, US 45 extends north as a four-lane divided highway, running concurrently with unsigned State Route 5 (SR 5), to an intersection with Old US Highway 45 S (a connector to Mississippi Highway 145 [MS 145]), where it narrows to an undivided four-lane and passes through the town of Guys. US 45/SR 5 then pass through Eastview, where they have an intersection with SR 57, before an intersection with SR 142 and entering Selmer. US 45/SR 5 passes through a business district before coming to an intersection with US 64/SR 15 and US 64 Business (US 64 Bus.), where US 45/SR 5 turns left to run concurrently with US 64/SR 15. They bypass downtown along the western side as a divided highway before coming to an interchange US 64 Bus. at the northern edge of town, where US 64/SR 15 splits off and US 45/SR 5 leaves Selmer and continues north. They pass through Bethel Springs before passing through rural areas to have an intersection with SR 199 in Finger. The highway then crosses into Chester County.

US 45/SR 5 continues north through rural areas before entering Henderson and intersecting SR 100. The highway has an intersection with SR 365 before bypassing downtown to the west. US 45/SR 5 then has another intersection with SR 365 before leaving Henderson and continuing northwest to cross into Madison County.

US 45/SR 5 passes through Pinson, where it has an intersection with SR 197, before passing through rural areas to enter the city of Jackson, where the road narrows to an undivided four-lane highway known as S Highland Avenue. It has an intersection with SR 18 (Bolivar Highway) before passing through residential areas. It then passes through a wooded area to cross a bridge over the South Fork of the Forked Deer River to enter downtown, where it comes to an intersection with US 70/SR 1 and US 45 Bypass/SR 186 (E/W Chester Street). US 45/SR 5 becomes N Highland Avenue as it passes through downtown before entering residential areas and coming to an intersection with US 412 Bus./SR 20 (North Parkway) at Old Hickory Mall. US 45/SR 5 passes through a business district before a single point urban interchange (SPUI) with I-40/US 412 (exit 82). The highway continues north through residential areas before leaving Jackson and coming to an interchange with the north end of US 45 Bypass (US 45 Byp.), where it runs concurrently with unsigned SR 186. US 45/SR 5/SR 186 goes north as a six-lane divided highway to cross a bridge over the Middle Fork of the Forked Deer River to enter Three Way and arrives at an interchange where US 45 splits into US 45W and US 45E. Here SR 186 goes north along US 45E, which in turn follows unsigned SR 43, while SR 5 follows US 45W.

=== Northern section ===
Mainline US 45, concurrent with unsigned SR 3, goes northeast and passes through neighborhoods in South Fulton along Chickasaw Drive before turning north onto Highland Drive at an intersection with Kentucky Route 116 (KY 116, W State Line Street) at the western edge of downtown. US 45 then crosses into Kentucky and the city of Fulton.

== Major intersections ==
| County | Location | mi | km | Destinations | Notes |
|---|---|---|---|---|---|
| McNairy | Guys | 0.0 | 0.0 | US 45 south – Corinth | Southern end of unsigned SR 5 concurrency; continuation beyond Mississippi state line |
| McNairy | Guys | 1.2 | 1.9 | Old US Hwy 45 S to MS 145 | Old US Hwy 45 S becomes MS 145 at the state line |
| McNairy | Eastview | 5.7 | 9.2 | SR 57 – Counce, Memphis | Provides access to Shiloh National Park and Pickwick Landing State Park |
| McNairy | Selmer | 10.3 | 16.6 | SR 142 east – Stantonville | Western terminus of SR 142 |
| McNairy | Selmer | 11.6 | 18.7 | US 64 Bus. west / US 64 east (East Poplar Avenue/SR 15) – Savannah | Southern end of US 64 concurrency; US 64 Bus. continues west through downtown Selmer |
| McNairy | Selmer | 16.9 | 27.2 | US 64 Bus. east / US 64 west (Cherry Avenue/SR 15) – Memphis | Northern end of US 64 concurrency; interchange; US 64 Bus. continues east through downtown Selmer |
| McNairy | Finger | 29.0 | 46.7 | SR 199 east (Finger-Leapwood Road) – Finger | Western terminus of SR 199 |
| Chester | Henderson | 34.5 | 55.5 | SR 100 – Whiteville, Decaturville | Interchange |
| Chester | Henderson | 34.8 | 56.0 | SR 365 north (Main Street) – Henderson | Southern terminus of SR 365 |
| Chester | Henderson | 37.2 | 59.9 | SR 365 south (White Avenue) – Henderson | Northern terminus of SR 365 |
| Madison | Pinson | 40.6 | 65.3 | SR 197 east (Ozier Road) – Pinson | Western terminus of SR 197; provides access to Pinson Mounds, Beech Bluff, and Mifflin |
| Madison | Jackson | 47.5 | 76.4 | SR 18 south (Bolivar Highway) – Bolivar | Northern terminus of SR 18 |
| Madison | Jackson | 50.1– 50.2 | 80.6– 80.8 | Bridge over the South Fork of the Forked Deer River | |
| Madison | Jackson | 51.4 | 82.7 | US 45 Byp. north / US 70 (Chester Street/SR 1/SR 186 north) | Southern terminus of US 45 Byp. and unsigned SR 186; provides access to McKellar-Sipes Regional Airport |
| Madison | Jackson | 54.4 | 87.5 | US 412 Bus. (North Parkway/SR 20) | |
| Madison | Jackson | 55.7 | 89.6 | I-40 / US 412 – Memphis, Nashville | I-40 exits 82 A/B |
| Madison | Jackson | 60.6 | 97.5 | US 45 Byp. south (Keith Short Bypass/SR 186 south) – Jackson | Northern terminus of US 45 Byp.; interchange; southern end of unsigned SR 186 concurrency |
| Madison | Jackson–Three Way line | 60.7– 60.8 | 97.7– 97.8 | Senator Bobby Carter Memorial Bridge over the Middle Fork of the Forked Deer River | |
| Madison | Three Way | 60.95 | 98.09 | US 45W north (SR 5 north) – Humboldt US 45E north (SR 43 north/SR 186 north) – Medina, Milan | Interchange; US 45 splits into US 45W and US 45E; southern terminus of unsigned SR 43 |
See US 45W and US 45E
| Obion | South Fulton | 0.00 | 0.00 | US 51 south / US 45W south (SR 3 south) – Union City US 51 north (SR 215 west) – Mayfield, KY US 45E south (SR 215 east) – Martin | Interchange; US 45W and US 45E merge to form US 45; southern end of unsigned SR 3 concurrency |
| Obion | South Fulton | 0.43 | 0.69 | KY 116 (W State Line Street) | Intersection is partially on state line |
| Obion | South Fulton | 0.45 | 0.72 | US 45 north (W Highland Drive) – Fulton | Continuation into Kentucky; northern terminus of unsigned SR 3 |
1.000 mi = 1.609 km; 1.000 km = 0.621 mi: Concurrency terminus
