= Tennessee State Route 43 =

State highway in Tennessee, United States

State Route 43
- U.S. Route 45E (US 45E); Skyhawk Parkway
- SR 43; primary in red, secondary in blue, unsigned in green

Route information
- Maintained by TDOT
- Length: 56.79 mi (91.39 km)
- Existed: October 1, 1923–present

Major junctions
- South end: US 45 / US 45W in Three Way
- US 79 / US 70A in Milan; Future I-169 / SR 22 in Martin; US 45E in South Fulton
- North end: KY 129 / KY 307 at the Kentucky in South Fulton

Location
- Country: United States
- State: Tennessee
- Counties: Madison, Gibson, Weakley, Obion

Highway system
- Tennessee State Routes; Interstate; US; State
← US 43	→ SR 44

State Route 43 (SR 43) is a south to north highway in Tennessee that is 56.79 miles (91.39 km) long. It begins in Madison County and ends in Obion County. SR 43 is little-known by the general public by this designation, as it is overlain by U.S. Route 45E (US 45E) for most of its length; the "43" designation is seen largely on mileposts. Two short sections of this route at Martin and South Fulton are fully signed. SR 43 from its southern terminus to Milan is designated as a Strategic Highway Network connector route servicing the Milan Arsenal.

== Route description ==
Most of SR 43 is a four-lane divided highway, which either overlies or bypasses its original route.

=== Madison County ===
SR 43 begins in Madison County in Three Way at an interchange with US 45/US 45W/SR 5. It goes northeast as a divided four-lane highway, overlain by US 45E, and SR 186 for a short distance, before leaving Three Way and crossing into Gibson County.

=== Gibson County ===
US 45E/SR 43 immediately enters Medina, where they bypass downtown on the western side and have an intersection with SR 152. They then leave Medina and continue north to enter Milan and have an intersection with SR 187 before becoming an undivided four-lane highway as they pass through residential areas. US 45E/SR 43 then enters downtown and becomes concurrent with SR 104. They then have an intersection with US 70A/US 79/SR 76/SR 77, where SR 77 joins the concurrency, before continuing north through downtown to an intersection with Front Street, where SR 77 and SR 104 split off to the west. US 45E/SR 43 continue north through residential areas to have an intersection with SR 425 before leaving Milan and continuing north through rural areas, where it becomes a divided highway again. US 45E/SR 43 cross a bridge over the Rutherford Fork of the Obion River before passing through Idlewild and Bradford, where it bypasses downtown to the west, becomes concurrent with SR 54, and has an intersection with SR 105. The highway then crosses the South Fork of the Obion River to enter Weakley County.

=== Weakley County ===
US 45E/SR 43/SR 54 then becomes an undivided highway again and enters Greenfield, where it goes straight through downtown, having an intersection with SR 124 and SR 54 splitting off and going east along Broad Street. US 45E/SR 43 then leave town and have an intersection with SR 445 before leaving Greenfield. The highway continues north through rural areas, becoming a divided highway again, before passing through Sharon, which it bypasses completely along its west side and has an interchange with SR 89. US 45E/SR 43 then enter Martin and come to an interchange with SR 216. Here, US 45E Bus/SR 372 begins and takes over the original route of US 45E/SR 43 through the city, US 45E turns east to become concurrent with SR 216, and SR 43 becomes signed as a primary highway and turns west along SR 216 and Skyhawk Parkway. SR 43/SR 216 go northwest as a 2-lane highway before SR 216 breaks off along Baker Road and continues west. SR 43 continues north to bypass the city along its west side to have an intersection with SR 431 after passing through a business district. SR 43 then has an interchange with SR 22 before passing through a rural part of the city and coming to an intersection with US 45E/SR 372, where SR 372 ends and SR 43 rejoins US 45E. US 45E/SR 43 then cross a bridge over the Obion River to enter Obion County.

=== Obion County ===
US 45E/SR 43 continue north through rural areas as a divided highway, where they have an intersection with SR 190, before entering South Fulton and coming to an intersection with unsigned SR 215. Here, US 45E turns west along SR 215 while SR 43 breaks off again, this time as a signed secondary highway, to pass through town as a 2-lane highway. It then comes to the Kentucky state line, where SR 43 ends at an intersection with KY 129 and KY 307 in downtown.

=== Signed segments ===
At Martin, SR 43 breaks free from US 45E as a signed primary highway and bypasses Martin to the west. This road is the original US 45E around Martin. It is not limited access, and because of its location, it could not easily be converted into a four-lane limited access highway in the 1990s. As a result, a new divided, limited-access four-lane US 45E was constructed around the east side of Martin, where more land was available, and the original SR 43 designation was revealed on signposts.

North of Martin, SR 43 rejoins US 45E and continues as an undivided four-lane highway to South Fulton, where it breaks free again as a signed secondary highway and follows the original US 45E Business route through town to the Kentucky state line, while US 45E bypasses to the west.

== Counties traversed (south to north) ==
State Route 43 traverses the counties shown in the table below.

Counties traversed by State Route 43
County	miles	kilometers
Madison	3.86	6.21
Gibson	24.26	39.04
Weakley	22.09	35.55
Obion	6.58	10.59

== Major intersections ==
County	Location	mi	km	Destinations	Notes
Madison	Three Way	0.00	0.00	US 45 south / US 45W north (SR 5/SR 186 south) – Jackson, Humboldt	Southern terminus of SR 43, US 45E, and US 45W; northern terminus of US 45; interchange; southern end of unsigned US 45E concurrency; hidden SR 43 begins briefly overlapped with SR 186
Madison	Three Way	0.55	0.89	SR 186 north – Gibson	Northern end of SR 186 concurrency
Gibson	Medina	4.69	7.55	SR 152 (W Church Avenue/Medina Humboldt Highway) – Medina, Humboldt	
Gibson	Milan	10.86	17.48	SR 187 west	Eastern terminus of SR 187
Gibson	Milan	13.26	21.34	SR 104 east (Ellington Drive)	Southern end of SR 104 concurrency
Gibson	Milan	13.39	21.55	US 70A / US 79 (Van Hook Street/SR 76/SR 77 east) – Humboldt, Huntingdon, McKenzie	Southern end of SR 77 concurrency
Gibson	Milan	13.81	22.23	SR 77 west (Front Street/SR 104 west) – Trenton	Northern end of SR 77/SR 104 concurrency
Gibson	Milan			SR 425 east (Middle Road)	Western terminus of SR 425
Gibson	Bradford	25.15	40.48	SR 54 (W Main Street) – Trenton, Bradford	
Gibson	Bradford	26.50	42.65	SR 54 west / SR 105 (Rutherford Highway/US Highway 45 N) – Rutherford, Bradford	Southern end of SR 54 concurrency
Weakley	Greenfield	30.93	49.78	SR 124 east (E Main Street) – McKenzie	Western terminus of SR 124
Weakley	Greenfield	30.98	49.86	SR 54 east (Broad Street) – Dresden	Northern end of SR 54 concurrency
Weakley	Greenfield	32.63	52.51	SR 445 west (Kimery Store Road)	Eastern terminus of SR 445; provides access to Big Cypress Tree State Park
Weakley	Sharon	36.94	59.45	SR 89 (Sidonia Road/W Main Street) – Kenton, Sharon	Interchange
Weakley	Martin	42.69	68.70	US 45E Bus. north (Elm Street/SR 372 north) / US 45E north (SR 216 east) – Martin, Dresden, South Fulton	Northern end of US 45E concurrency; southern terminus of US 45E Bus./SR 372; southern end of SR 216 concurrency; interchange; SR 43 becomes a signed highway; US 45E continues north concurrent with SR 216
Weakley	Martin	44.66	71.87	SR 216 west (Baker Road) – Rives	Northern end of SR 216 concurrency
Weakley	Martin	46.18	74.32	SR 431 (University Street) – Union City, Martin	Provides access to University of Tennessee at Martin
Weakley	Martin	47.47	76.40	SR 22 – Union City, Dresden	Interchange
Weakley	Martin	50.08	80.60	US 45E south (N Lindell Street/SR 372 south) – Martin	SR 43 resumes hidden status and continues north concurrent with US 45E
Obion	McConnell	51.71	83.22	SR 190 south (McConnell Road)	Northern terminus of SR 190
Obion	South Fulton	56.21	90.46	US 45E north (SR 215 west)	SR 43 becomes a signed highway through downtown South Fulton; eastern terminus of SR 215; northern end of US 45E concurrency; US 45E continues north along SR 215
Obion	South Fulton	56.79	91.39	KY 307 (Commercial Avenue) / KY 129 (State Line Highway)	Kentucky state line; Northern terminus
1.000 mi = 1.609 km; 1.000 km = 0.621 mi: Concurrency terminus
