= Tennessee State Route 216 =

State highway in Tennessee, United States

State Route 216
- SR 216 highlighted in red

Route information
- Maintained by TDOT
- Length: 17.7 mi (28.5 km)
- Existed: July 1, 1983–present

Major junctions
- West end: US 45W near Rives
- SR 43 in Martin
- East end: US 45E / SR 22 / SR 431 in Martin

Location
- Country: United States
- State: Tennessee
- Counties: Obion, Weakley

Highway system
- Tennessee State Routes; Interstate; US; State
← SR 215	→ SR 217

State Route 216 (SR 216) is a 17.7-mile-long (28.5 km) east–west state highway in West Tennessee, connecting Rives with Martin.

== Route description ==
SR 216 begins as secondary highway in Obion County at an intersection with US 45W/SR 5/SR 21. It goes as Pleasant Hill Road to pass through the town of Rives before crossing the North Fork of the Obion River and becoming Rives Mount Pelia Road. The highway then winds its way southeast through farmland to cross into Weakley County. SR 216 becomes Mount Pelia Road as it passes through the community of Mount Pelia before winding its way eastward and entering Martin, where it passes through some neighborhoods before splitting off onto Baker Road. It then becomes concurrent with SR 43 (Skyhawk Parkway) as they bypass downtown and come to an interchange with US 45E and US 45E Business (Elm Street/SR 372). Prior to this point, the entire route of SR 216 is a two-lane highway. Here SR 43 becomes unsigned and follows US 45E south while SR 216 becomes an unsigned primary highway and follows US 45E north. They go east as a 4-lane divided freeway, having an interchange with Pair Road, before SR 216 comes to an end at an with SR 22 and SR 431, with US 45E continuing north along SR 22 north.

== Major intersections ==
County	Location	mi	km	Destinations	Notes
Obion		0.0	0.0	US 45W (SR 5/SR 21) – Union City, Kenton	Western terminus; SR 216 begins as a secondary highway
Obion	Rives			Bridge over the North Fork of the Obion River	
Weakley	Martin			SR 43 north (Skyhawk Parkway) – South Fulton	Western end of SR 43 concurrency
Weakley	Martin			US 45E south (Elm Street/SR 43 south) – Sharon, Milan, Jackson US 45E Bus. north (Elm Street/SR 372 north) – Downtown	Interchange; eastern end of SR 43 concurrency; western end of US 45E concurrency; southern terminus of US 45E Business and SR 372; SR 216 becomes an unsigned primary highway; west end of freeway
Weakley	Martin			Pair Road	Interchange
Weakley	Martin	17.7	28.5	US 45E north / SR 22 north – Union City, South Fulton SR 22 south – Dresden SR 431 north (Main Street) – Downtown	Eastern terminus; interchange; southern terminus of SR 431; eastern end of US 45E concurrency; freeway continues along US 45E/SR 22 north; SR 216 ends as an unsigned primary highway
1.000 mi = 1.609 km; 1.000 km = 0.621 mi: Concurrency terminus
