= U.S. Route 45W =

U.S. Highway in Tennessee

U.S. Route 45W
- US 45W highlighted in red

Route information
- Maintained by TDOT
- Length: 62.33 mi (100.31 km)

Major junctions
- South end: US 45 / US 45E in Three Way
- US 70A / US 79 in Humboldt; US 51 / SR 22 in Union City
- North end: US 45 / US 45E / US 51 in South Fulton

Location
- Country: United States
- State: Tennessee
- Counties: Madison, Gibson, Obion

Highway system
- United States Numbered Highway System; List; Special; Divided; Tennessee State Routes; Interstate; US; State
| ← US 45E | → SR 45 |

U.S. Route 45W (US 45W) is a 62.33-mile-long (100.31 km) United States Numbered Highway in West Tennessee, connecting Jackson with South Fulton via Humboldt, Trenton, Rutherford, and Union City. For the majority of its length, it runs concurrently with unsigned State Route 5 (SR 5).

== Route description ==
US 45W begins in Madison County, concurrent with unsigned SR 5, in Three way at an interchange between US 45 (SR 5) and US 45E (SR 43). The highway goes as a 4-lane divided highway to cross into Gibson County and enter Humboldt, where they come to an intersection with unsigned SR 366. Here, SR 5 follows US 45W Business through while US 45W bypasses downtown to the west and north along SR 366, where it has intersections SR 152 and US 70A/US 79/SR 76. US 45W and SR 5 then rejoin at an intersection with US 70A Bypass/US 79 Bypass, and they leave Humboldt head north through farmland. US 45W/SR 5 then pass through Fruitland, where it has an intersection with SR 420 before passing through rural areas. It then enters Trenton at an intersection with SR 457 and SR 367, where US 45W/SR 5 turn right to follow a 2-lane bypass of downtown on the eastern side. The highway becomes concurrent with SR 54 and an intersection with SR 186 in a business district before having an intersection with SR 77 and SR 104, where it becomes concurrent with SR 77 and crosses the North Fork of the Forked Deer River, in a more rural part of town. SR 54 then splits off before the highway curves to the west to have another intersection with SR 367. US 45W/SR 5/SR 77 then widen to a 4-lane divided highway to curve back northward and leave Trenton. They wind their way north through farmland to pass through Dyer, where it bypasses the town on its west side, to have an interchange with SR 185, where SR 77 splits off and goes west. US 45W/SR 5 continue north to pass through Rutherford, where it bypasses the town on its west side, and has an interchange with SR 105. US 45W/SR 5 then narrows to 2-lanes as it has an intersection with its former alignment just before entering Kenton and crossing into Obion County.

US 45W/SR 5 have a short concurrency with SR 89 before leaving Kenton and continuing north. The highway passes through a wooded area to cross a bridge over the Obion River before passing through farmland to become concurrent with SR 21. They then have an intersection with SR 216 just west of Rives before continuing north to enter Union City and come to an intersection with SR 431/SR 184 (W/E Reelfoot Avenue), where US 45W splits from SR 5 and turns right onto SR 431/SR 184. US 45W/SR 431/SR 184 goes east through a business district as a 4-lane undivided highway before entering neighborhoods before US 45W/SR 184 split off from SR 431 and follow S Miles Avenue. They then make a right onto Nailling Drive to pass through more rural and suburban areas before coming to an interchange between SR 22 and SR 214 (Ken Tenn Highway), where SR 184 ends and US 45W turns north along SR 22. They immediately come to an interchange with US 51/SR 3, where US 45W splits from SR 22 and heads northeast along US 51/SR 3 as a 4-lane freeway. 2 miles (3.2 km) northeast of Union City, US 51/US 45W has a semi-directional T interchange with the SR 690 (Future I-69) freeway. They then have another interchange with SR 214 to enter South Fulton before arriving at an interchange with US 45E/SR 215, where US 45W and US 45E merge to form mainline US 45.

== Major intersections ==
| County | Location | mi | km | Destinations | Notes |
|---|---|---|---|---|---|
| Madison | Three Way | 0.0 | 0.0 | US 45 south (SR 5 south/SR 186 south) – Jackson US 45E north (SR 43 north/SR 186 north) – Medina, Milan | Interchange; US 45 splits into US 45W and US 45E; southern end of unsigned SR 5 concurrency |
| Gibson | Humboldt | 4.3 | 6.9 | US 45W Bus. north (E Main Street/SR 5 north) / SR 366 begins – Downtown | Northern end of SR 5 concurrency; southern terminus of US 45 Business; eastern terminus of unsigned SR 366; southern end of SR 366 concurrency |
| Gibson | Humboldt | 5.1 | 8.2 | SR 152 (E Mitchell Street) – Medina, Downtown | |
| Gibson | Humboldt | 6.6 | 10.6 | US 70A / US 79 (Eastend Drive/SR 76) – Milan, Downtown US 70A Byp. begins / US 79 Byp. begins | Eastern terminus of US 70A Bypass; northern terminus of US 79 Bypass; southern end of US 70A Bypass/US 79 Bypass concurrency |
| Gibson | Humboldt | 7.7 | 12.4 | US 70A Byp. west / US 79 Byp. south (SR 366 west) – Gadsden, Bells US 45W Bus. south (N Central Avenue/SR 5 south) – Downtown | Northern terminus of US 45W Business; southern end of SR 5 concurrency; northern end of US 70A Bypass/US 79 Bypass/SR 366 concurrency |
| Gibson | Fruitland | 11.3 | 18.2 | SR 420 east – Gibson | Western terminus of SR 420 |
| Gibson | Trenton | 15.0 | 24.1 | SR 457 west / SR 367 north (S College Street) – Dyersburg, Trenton | Eastern terminus of SR 457; Southern terminus of SR 367 |
| Gibson | Trenton | 17.0 | 27.4 | SR 54 south (Armory Street) – Alamo | Southern end of unsigned SR 54 concurrency |
| Gibson | Trenton | 17.4 | 28.0 | SR 186 south (Gibson Road) – Gibson | Northern terminus of SR 186 |
| Gibson | Trenton | 18.0 | 29.0 | SR 104 / SR 77 east (E Eaton Street) – Dyersburg, Milan | Southern end of unsigned SR 77 concurrency |
| Gibson | Trenton | 18.1– 18.2 | 29.1– 29.3 | Bridge over the North Fork of the Forked Deer River | |
| Gibson | Trenton | 19.4 | 31.2 | SR 54 north (Halliburton Street) – Bradford | Northern end of unsigned SR 54 concurrency |
| Gibson | Trenton | 20.6 | 33.2 | SR 367 south (N College Street) – Trenton | Northern terminus of SR 367 |
| Gibson | Dyer | 26.6 | 42.8 | SR 77 west (Yorkville Street) / SR 185 east – Yorkville, Dyer | Northern end of unsigned SR 77 concurrency; interchange; western terminus of SR 185 |
| Gibson | Rutherford | 30.5 | 49.1 | SR 105 (McKnight Street) – Trimble, Bradford | Interchange |
| Obion | Kenton | 36.0 | 57.9 | SR 89 (E College Street/E Church Street) – Trimble, Sharon | Short SR 89 concurrency |
| Obion | Three Rivers Wildlife Management Area | 41.4– 41.8 | 66.6– 67.3 | Bridge over the Obion River | |
| Obion | | 46.6 | 75.0 | SR 21 west (Troy-Rives Road) – Troy | Southern end of SR 21 concurrency |
| Obion | | 47.6 | 76.6 | SR 216 east (Pleasant Hill Road) – Rives | Western terminus of SR 216 |
| Obion | Union City | 51.5 | 82.9 | SR 431 north (W Reelfoot Avenue/SR 184 south) SR 5 north / SR 21 east (S 1st Street) – Downtown | Northern end of SR 5/SR 21 concurrency; southern end of SR 431/SR 184 concurrency |
| Obion | Union City | 52.4 | 84.3 | SR 431 south (E Reelfoot Avenue) – Martin | Northern end of SR 431 concurrency |
| Obion | Union City | 55.0 | 88.5 | SR 22 south – Martin SR 214 north (Ken Tenn Highway) | Interchange; northern terminus of unsigned SR 184; southern terminus of SR 214; southern end of SR 22 concurrency |
| Obion | Union City | 55.4 | 89.2 | US 51 south (Jere B Ford Memorial Highway/SR 3 south) / SR 22 north – Troy, Dyersburg | Interchange; northern end of SR 22 concurrency; southern end of US 51/SR 3 concurrency |
| Obion | | 57.4 | 92.4 | SR 690 south / Future I-69 south | Semi-directional T interchange; opened to traffic in February 2024; future southern end of I-69 overlap |
| Obion | South Fulton | 60.6 | 97.5 | SR 214 south (Ken Tenn Highway) | Interchange; southbound exit and northbound entrance |
| Obion | South Fulton | 62.33 | 100.31 | US 51 north (SR 215 west) – Mayfield, KY US 45 north (Chickasaw Drive/SR 3 north) – Downtown US 45E south (SR 215 east) – Martin | Interchange; US 45W and US 45E merge to form US 45 |
1.000 mi = 1.609 km; 1.000 km = 0.621 mi: Concurrency terminus; Incomplete access
