= Tennessee State Route 457 =

State highway in Tennessee, United States

State Route 457
- TN 457 highlighted in red

Route information
- Maintained by TDOT
- Length: 4.0 mi (6.4 km)

Major junctions
- West end: SR 104 near Trenton
- SR 54 near Trenton
- East end: US 45W / SR 367 at Trenton

Location
- Country: United States
- State: Tennessee
- Counties: Gibson

Highway system
- Tennessee State Routes; Interstate; US; State
← SR 456	→ SR 458

State Route 457 (SR 457) is a short four-lane divided highway that was recently built in Gibson County, Tennessee that functions as a southwest bypass of Trenton. The highway is designated as a primary state route throughout its length with a 55 mph (89 km/h) speed limit and no access control.

== Route description ==
SR 457 originates from a large-signalized intersection with US 45W (SR 5) and SR 367. Northbound US 45W picks up at the south end of SR 457 and continues to form the eastern bypass of Trenton. SR 457 traverses rural farmland and crosses SR 54 at an at-grade intersection. SR 457 continues west past this point and terminates at its intersection with SR 104 and Old Highway 104. Past this intersection, the roadway continues west as a limited access four-lane divided highway with a 65 mph (105 km/h) speed limit designated as SR 104.

== Major intersections ==
The entire route is in Gibson County.

Location	mi	km	Destinations	Notes
Trenton	0.0	0.0	US 45W (S College Street/Highway 45 Bypass South/SR 5) / SR 367 north (S College Street) – Humboldt, Dyer, Downtown	Eastern terminus; southern terminus of SR 367
Trenton	2.7	4.3	SR 54 (Alamo Highway) – Alamo, Downtown	
	4.0	6.4	SR 104 (Dyersburg Highway) – Dyersburg, Trenton	Western terminus
1.000 mi = 1.609 km; 1.000 km = 0.621 mi

== See also ==
- Tennessee Department of Transportation
- City of Trenton Highway Map
