= Tennessee State Route 215 =

State highway in Tennessee, United States

State Route 215
- John C. Jones Parkway

Route information
- Maintained by TDOT
- Length: 2.1 mi (3.4 km)
- Existed: July 1, 1983–present

Major junctions
- West end: I-69 / US 51 at Kentucky state line in South Fulton
- US 51 / US 45 / US 45W at South Fulton
- East end: US 45E / SR 43 at South Fulton

Location
- Country: United States
- State: Tennessee
- Counties: Obion

Highway system
- Tennessee State Routes; Interstate; US; State
← SR 214	→ SR 216

State Route 215 (SR 215) is an unsigned, east–west, state highway entirely within the city limits of South Fulton, Tennessee, although the direction is more northwest to southeast as it curves around the southwest part of the city. It is better known as US 45E and is briefly US 51 near the Kentucky state line. The route serves as a bypass for South Fulton. The northwestern portion is a four-lane divided highway and the southeastern portion is a four lane undivided highway with a center left turn lane.

== Route description ==
Starting from its intersection at US 45E/SR 43, SR 215 (along with US 45E) travels in a westerly direction and then curves toward the north. The route then crosses a creek and railroad before an interchange. At this intersection, SR 215 continues north for about 1300 feet until the Kentucky state line. US 45E and US 45W merge from here and continue to the east into Fulton, Kentucky. US 45/SR 3 (locally known as Chickasaw Drive) pass over SR 215 while US 51 merges onto SR 215 coming from the west and continues north into Kentucky. SR 215 ends at Kentucky while US 51 keeps going along northbound I-69 (formerly Purchase Parkway).

== Future ==
At the above described interchange the westbound and northbound sections are up to freeway standards. Because of this, the routing for Interstate 69 is going to go through this interchange, thus using the 1300 foot section of SR 215. The way the interchange is currently configured would more than likely have to be altered in order to eliminate some left hand turns.

== Major intersections ==
The entire route is in South Fulton, Obion County.

mi	km	Destinations	Notes
0.0	0.0	US 45E south (Broadway Street/SR 43 south) – Martin SR 43 north (Broadway Street) – Downtown	Eastern terminus; eastern end of US 45E concurrency
1.6– 2.0	2.6– 3.2	US 45 north / US 45W south / US 51 south (Chickasaw Drive/SR 3) – Union City, Downtown	Interchange; western end of US 45E concurrency; US 45E and US 45W merge to form US 45; southern end of US 51 concurrency; Future I-69
2.1	3.4	US 51 north / Purchase Parkway north – Fulton, Mayfield	Kentucky state line; western terminus; southern terminus of Purchase Parkway; Future I-69
1.000 mi = 1.609 km; 1.000 km = 0.621 mi: Concurrency terminus; Route transition
