= South Fulton =

South Fulton may refer to:

- South Fulton, Georgia
- South Fulton, Tennessee
