= Tennessee State Route 185 =

State highway in Tennessee, United States

State Route 185
- Yorkville Street; Main Street; Poplar Grove Road
- SR 185 highlighted in red

Route information
- Maintained by TDOT
- Length: 7.67 mi (12.34 km)
- Existed: July 1, 1983–present

Major junctions
- West end: US 45W / SR 77 at Dyer
- East end: SR 54 near Bradford

Location
- Country: United States
- State: Tennessee
- Counties: Gibson

Highway system
- Tennessee State Routes; Interstate; US; State
← SR 184	→ SR 186

State Route 185 (SR 185) is an east to west secondary highway in Gibson County in Tennessee that is 7.67 miles (12.34 km) long. Its western terminus is in Dyer at the junction with US 45W. Its eastern terminus is just outside Bradford at SR 54. East of Dyer the highway is also called Poplar Grove Road.

== Route description ==
SR 185 begins just west of downtown Dyer at an interchange with US 45W/SR 5/SR 77. It goes east as Yorkville Street to enter downtown, where it turns south as Main Street (Old US 45W). It passes through downtown before turning east onto Poplar Grove Road, where it leaves Dyer and continues east through farmland before coming to an end at an intersection with SR 54.

== History ==
The original western terminus was in Dyer at the intersection of Main Street (then US 45W) and Poplar Grove Road. In 2001, when US 45W was realigned to a newly constructed bypass route to the west of Dyer, SR 185 was extended through Dyer on Main Street and Yorkville Street (formerly SR 77) to the new US 45W. This change went unsigned until May 2008.

== Major intersections ==
The entire route is in Gibson County.

Location	mi	km	Destinations	Notes
Dyer	0.0	0.0	US 45W (SR 5) / SR 77 east – Rutherford, Trenton SR 77 west (Yorkville Highway) – Yorkville	Interchange; western terminus
Dyer	0.6	0.97	N Main Street - Rutherford	Old US 45W
Dyer	1.6	2.6	S Main Street - Trenton	Old US 45W
	7.67	12.34	SR 54 (Bradford Highway) – Trenton, Bradford	Eastern terminus
1.000 mi = 1.609 km; 1.000 km = 0.621 mi

== See also ==
- List of Tennessee state highways
