= U.S. Route 45E =

U.S. Highway in Tennessee

U.S. Route 45E
- US 45E highlighted in red

Route information
- Maintained by TDOT
- Length: 61.23 mi (98.54 km)

Major junctions
- South end: US 45 / US 45W in Three Way
- US 70A / US 79 in Milan; SR 22 / SR 431 in Martin
- North end: US 45 / US 45W / US 51 in South Fulton

Location
- Country: United States
- State: Tennessee
- Counties: Madison, Gibson, Weakley, Obion

Highway system
- United States Numbered Highway System; List; Special; Divided; Tennessee State Routes; Interstate; US; State
← US 45	→ US 45W

U.S. Route 45E (US 45E) is a 61.23-mile-long (98.54 km) state highway in West Tennessee, connecting Jackson with South Fulton via Milan and Martin. For the majority of its length, it runs concurrently with unsigned State Route 43 (SR 43) for most of that highway’s length except for short segments at Martin and South Fulton, where it is cosigned with SR 216 and SR 215, respectively.

== Route description ==
US 45E begins in Madison County, running concurrently with unsigned SR 43 and SR 186 in Three Way at an interchange between US 45 and US 45W (SR 5). It goes northeast as a four-lane divided highway, where SR 186 splits off, before crossing into Gibson County. US 45E/SR 43 immediately enters Medina, where the highway bypasses downtown on the western side and has an intersection with SR 152. It then leaves Medina and continues north to enter Milan and has an intersection with SR 187 before becoming an undivided four-lane highway as it passes through residential areas. US 45E/SR 43 then enters downtown and runs concurrently with SR 104. The highway then has an intersection with US 70A/US 79/SR 76/SR 77, where SR 77 joins the concurrency, before continuing north through downtown to an intersection with Front Street, where SR 77 and SR 104 split off to the west. US 45E/SR 43 continues north through residential areas to have an intersection with SR 425 before leaving Milan and continuing north through rural areas, where it becomes a divided highway again. US 45E/SR 43 crosses a bridge over the Rutherford Fork of the Obion River before passing through Idlewild and Bradford, where it bypasses downtown to the west, runs concurrently with SR 54 and has an intersection with SR 105. The highway then crosses the South Fork of the Obion River to enter Weakley County.

US 45E/SR 43/SR 54 then becomes an undivided highway again and enters Greenfield, where it goes straight through downtown, having an intersection with SR 124 and SR 54 splitting off and going east along Broad Street. US 45E/SR 43 the leaves town and has an intersection with SR 445 before leaving Greenfield. The highway continues north through rural areas, becoming a divided highway again to cross the Middle Fork of the Obion River, before passing through Sharon, which it bypasses completely along its west side and has an interchange with SR 89. US 45E/SR 43 then enters Martin and comes to an interchange with SR 216. Here, US 45E Bus./SR 372 begins and takes over the original route of US 45E/SR 43 through the city, US 45E turns east to become concurrent with SR 216, and SR 43 becomes signed as a primary highway and turns west along SR 216 and Skyhawk Parkway. US 45E/SR 216 heads east as a four-lane freeway along the south side of the city to have an interchange with Pair Road before coming to a very large interchange with SR 22 and SR 431, where SR 216 ends and SR 22 becomes concurrent with US 45E. The highway turns north to follow the eastern and northern edges of the city, where it has an interchange with Industrial Park Drive, before coming to another interchange with US 45E Business/SR 372 (N Lindell Street), where US 45E Bus. ends and US 45E splits from SR 22 and follows SR 372 north. The highway heads north through residential areas as a four-lane undivided highway before coming to another intersection with SR 43 (Skyhawk Parkway), where SR 372 ends and US 45E joins SR 43 again to leave Martin as a divided highway.

The highway crosses the North Fork of the Obion River into Obion County, where it passes through farmland, and has an intersection with SR 190, before entering South Fulton and becoming undivided to arrive at an intersection with unsigned SR 215. Here, SR 43 splits off, and becomes signed again, along Broadway Street, while US 45E bypasses downtown along the south and west sides running concurrently with SR 215. US 45E then comes to an end at an interchange between US 51, US 45W, US 45, and unsigned SR 3, just feet from the Kentucky state line.

== Major intersections ==
County	Location	mi	km	Destinations	Notes
Madison	Three Way	0.00	0.00	US 45 south / US 45W north (SR 5/SR 186 south) – Jackson, Humboldt	Interchange; US 45 splits into US 45W and US 45E; southern end of unsigned SR 43/SR 186 concurrency
Madison	Three Way	0.55	0.89	SR 186 north – Gibson	Northern end of SR 186 concurrency
Gibson	Medina	4.69	7.55	SR 152 (W Church Avenue/Medina Humboldt Highway) – Medina, Humboldt	
Gibson	Milan	10.86	17.48	SR 187 west	Eastern terminus of SR 187
Gibson	Milan	13.26	21.34	SR 104 east (Ellington Drive)	Southern end of SR 104 concurrency
Gibson	Milan	13.39	21.55	US 70A / US 79 (Van Hook Street/SR 76/SR 77 east) – Humboldt, Huntingdon, McKenzie	Southern end of SR 77 concurrency
Gibson	Milan	13.81	22.23	SR 77 west (Front Street/SR 104 west) – Trenton	Northern end of SR 77/SR 104 concurrency
Gibson	Milan	15.25	24.54	SR 425 east (Middle Road)	Western terminus of SR 425
Gibson		19.25	30.98	Bridge over the Rutherford Fork of the Obion River	
Gibson	Bradford	25.15	40.48	SR 54 (W Main Street) – Trenton, Bradford	
Gibson	Bradford	26.50	42.65	SR 54 west / SR 105 (Rutherford Highway/US Highway 45 N) – Rutherford, Bradford	Southern end of SR 54 concurrency
Gibson–Weakley county line		28.28– 28.38	45.51– 45.67	Bridge over the South Fork of the Obion River	
Weakley	Greenfield	30.93	49.78	SR 124 east (E Main Street) – McKenzie	Western terminus of SR 124
Weakley	Greenfield	30.98	49.86	SR 54 east (Broad Street) – Dresden	Northern end of SR 54 concurrency
Weakley	Greenfield	32.63	52.51	SR 445 west (Kimery Store Road)	Eastern terminus of SR 445; provides access to Big Cypress Tree State Park
Weakley		34.53– 34.72	55.57– 55.88	George Broussard Memorial Bridge over the Middle Fork of the Obion River	
Weakley	Sharon	36.94	59.45	SR 89 (Sidonia Road/W Main Street) – Kenton, Sharon	Interchange
Weakley	Martin	42.69	68.70	US 45E Bus. north (Elm Street/SR 372 north) – Downtown SR 43 north / SR 216 west (Skyhawk Parkway) – Rives, Union City	Interchange; northern end of SR 43 concurrency; southern terminus of US 45E Bus./SR 372; southern end of SR 216 concurrency
Weakley	Martin	43.8	70.5	Pair Road	Interchange
Weakley	Martin	45.2	72.7	SR 22 south – Dresden SR 431 north (Main Street) – Downtown	Interchange; eastern terminus of SR 216; southern terminus of SR 431; southern end of SR 22 concurrency
Weakley	Martin	46.7	75.2	Industrial Park Drive	Interchange
Weakley	Martin	49.5	79.7	SR 22 north – Union City US 45E Bus. south (N Lindell Street/SR 372 south) – Downtown	Interchange; northern end of SR 22 concurrency; northern terminus of US 45E Business; southern end of SR 372 concurrency
Weakley	Martin	51.7	83.2	SR 43 south (Skyhawk Parkway)	Southern end of SR 43 concurrency; northern terminus of SR 372
Weakley–Obion county line		52.1– 52.2	83.8– 84.0	Bridge over the North Fork of the Obion River	
Obion		53.3	85.8	SR 190 south (McConnell Road)	Northern terminus of SR 190
Obion	South Fulton	57.8	93.0	SR 43 north (Broadway Street) – Downtown SR 215 begins	Northern end of SR 43 concurrency; eastern terminus of unsigned SR 215; southern end of SR 215 concurrency
Obion	South Fulton	61.23	98.54	US 51 south / US 45W south (SR 3 south) – Union City US 51 north (SR 215 west) – Mayfield, KY US 45 north (Chickasaw Drive/SR 3 north) – Downtown	Interchange; US 45W and US 45E merge to form US 45
1.000 mi = 1.609 km; 1.000 km = 0.621 mi: Concurrency terminus

== Martin business route ==
U.S. Route 45E Business
- Location: Martin, Tennessee
- Length: 4.0 mi (6.4 km)

U.S. Route 45E Business (US 45E Bus.) is a 4.0-mile-long (6.4 km) business route of US 45E that travels along that highway’s former alignment through downtown Martin, Tennessee. It runs concurrently with unsigned State Route 372 (SR 372) for its entire length.

The highway begins as Elm Street at an interchange between US 45E, SR 43, and SR 216. It heads north through rural areas as a two-lane highway for a little over a mile before passing through a business district and some neighborhoods. US 45E Bus. then enters downtown and becomes concurrent with SR 431 as they pass along University Street and S Lindell Street as a four-lane undivided highway. SR 431 now splits off along Main Street and US 45 Bus. narrows to two lanes and continues north to leave downtown and pass through a business district. It passes through some neighborhoods before coming to an end at an interchange with SR 22 and US 45E, with unsigned SR 372 continuing north along N Lindell Street and US 45E.

The entire route is in Martin, Weakley County.

mi	km	Destinations	Notes
0.0	0.0	US 45E south (Elm Street/SR 43) – Sharon, Milan SR 43 north / SR 216 west (Skyhawk Parkway) – Rives, Union City US 45E north (SR 216 east) – Dresden, South Fulton	Southern terminus of US 45E Bus. and SR 372; southern end of SR 372 concurrency; interchange
1.9	3.1	SR 431 north (University Street) – University of Tennessee at Martin, Union City	Southern end of wrong-way SR 431 concurrency
2.1	3.4	SR 431 south (Main Street) – Dresden	Northern end of wrong-way SR 431 concurrency
4.0	6.4	SR 22 / US 45E south – Union City, Dresden US 45E north (N Lindell Street/SR 372 north) – South Fulton	Northern terminus; interchange
1.000 mi = 1.609 km; 1.000 km = 0.621 mi: Concurrency terminus

== State Route 372 ==
State Route 372
- Location: Martin, Tennessee
- Length: 6.0 mi (9.7 km)
- Existed: July 1, 1983–present

State Route 372 (SR 372) is an entirely unsigned 6.0-mile-long (9.7 km) north-south state highway in the city of Martin, Tennessee. It serves as the unsigned companion route of US 45E Business, as well as for US 45E between the SR 22 interchange and the SR 43 junction on the north side of the city.
