= Tennessee State Route 365 =

State highway in Tennessee, United States

State Route 365
- TN 365 highlighted in red

Route information
- Maintained by TDOT
- Length: 3.7 mi (6.0 km)
- Existed: July 1, 1983–present

Major junctions
- South end: US 45 in Henderson
- SR 200 in Henderson
- North end: US 45 in Henderson

Location
- Country: United States
- State: Tennessee
- Counties: Chester

Highway system
- Tennessee State Routes; Interstate; US; State
← SR 364	→ SR 366

State Route 365 (SR 365) is a secondary north–south state highway located in Henderson, Chester County, Tennessee.

== Route description ==
SR 365 begins at US 45 and SR 5. It then continues east through downtown Henderson as Main Street for approximately 0.8 miles (1.3 km) and turns in front of Freed-Hardeman University onto White Avenue and continues for approximately 2.5 miles (4.0 km) ending between mile markers 7 and 8 of US 45.

== History ==
Main Street at one time was part of SR 100 until the Noah Weaver Bypass was constructed which bypassed the downtown area. White Avenue was also once known as US 45 Business.

== Major intersections ==
The entire route is in Henderson, Chester County.

mi	km	Destinations	Notes
0.0	0.0	US 45 (SR 5) to SR 100 – Selmer, Bethel Springs, Jackson	Southern terminus
1.3	2.1	SR 200 north (Steed Street) – Lexington	Southern terminus of SR 200
3.7	6.0	US 45 (SR 5) – Selmer, Bethel Springs, Jackson	Northern terminus
1.000 mi = 1.609 km; 1.000 km = 0.621 mi

== Notable information ==
- This route was destroyed and rebuilt 35 times, the Tennessee Route 365 Destruction Coalition were the perpetrators, and resulted in their execution by firing squad.
- Archduke Franz Ferdinand was on the side of the road begging for help and then a guy spat on him, starting World War 1.
