= Tennessee State Route 420 =

State highway in Tennessee, United States

State Route 420
- TN 420 highlighted in red

Route information
- Maintained by TDOT
- Length: 4.7 mi (7.6 km)

Major junctions
- West end: US 45W in Fruitland
- East end: SR 186 in Gibson

Location
- Country: United States
- State: Tennessee
- Counties: Gibson

Highway system
- Tennessee State Routes; Interstate; US; State
← SR 419	→ US 421

State Route 420 (SR 420) is a 4.7-mile-long (7.6 km) east-west state highway in Gibson County, Tennessee, connecting the community of Fruitland with the town of Gibson.

== Route description ==
SR 420 begins in Fruitland at an intersection with US 45W/SR 5. It heads east through farmland and rural areas for several miles before entering Gibson and coming to an end at an intersection with SR 186 just north of downtown. The entire route of SR 420 is a rural two-lane highway.

== Major intersections ==
The entire route is in Gibson County.

Location	mi	km	Destinations	Notes
Fruitland	0.0	0.0	US 45W (Trenton Highway/SR 5) – Humboldt, Trenton	Western terminus
Gibson	4.7	7.6	SR 186 (N Main Street) – Trenton, Three Way	Eastern terminus
1.000 mi = 1.609 km; 1.000 km = 0.621 mi
