= Kentucky Route 125 =

State highway in Kentucky, United States

Kentucky Route 125
- KY 125 highlighted in red

Route information
- Maintained by KYTC
- Length: 6.296 mi (10.132 km)

Major junctions
- South end: SR 5 north of Woodland Mills, TN
- North end: KY 94 in Hickman

Location
- Country: United States
- State: Kentucky
- Counties: Fulton

Highway system
- Kentucky State Highway System; Interstate; US; State; Parkways
← KY 124	→ KY 126

Kentucky Route 125 (KY 125) is a 6.296-mile-long (10.132 km) state highway in Fulton County, Kentucky, United States. It runs from Tennessee State Route 5 (SR 5) at the Kentucky–Tennessee state line north of Woodland Mills, Tennessee, to KY 94 in Hickman.

== Major intersections ==
The entire route is in Fulton County.

Location	mi	km	Destinations	Notes
	0.000	0.000	SR 5 south (Thompson Street South) – Woodland Mills	Southern terminus at Kentucky–Tennessee state line
	0.482	0.776	KY 2140 north	Southern terminus of KY 2140
	1.659	2.670	KY 166 east	Western terminus of KY 166
	2.282	3.673	KY 1128	
	3.000	4.828	KY 1129 east	Western terminus of KY 1129
Hickman	5.386	8.668	KY 1099 (7th Street)	
Hickman	6.067	9.764	KY 1463 south (Myron Cory Drive)	Northern terminus of KY 1463
Hickman	6.296	10.132	KY 94 (Moscow Street / Avenue) / Magnolia Street	Northern terminus; continues as Magnolia Street
1.000 mi = 1.609 km; 1.000 km = 0.621 mi
