= W.W. Morris House =

- W. W. Morris House
- U.S. National Register of Historic Places
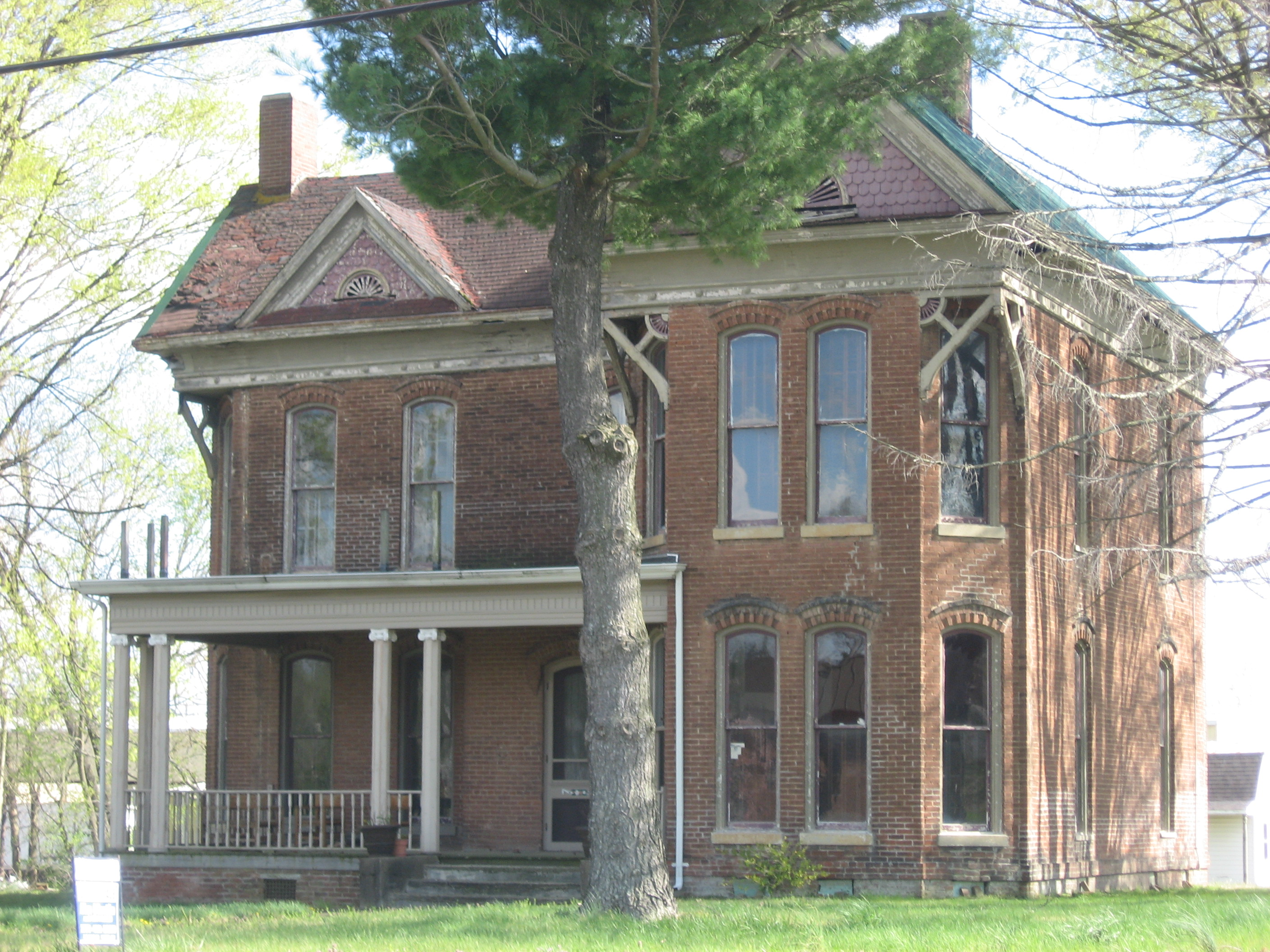

- Location within Tennessee Location within the United States
- Location: 305 West State Line Road, South Fulton, Tennessee
- Coordinates: 36°29′59″N 88°53′09″W
- Area: less than one acre
- Built: 1885
- Built by: Robert Brothers Builders
- NRHP reference No.: 83003058
- Added to NRHP: January 27, 1983

The W.W. Morris House is a historic house in South Fulton, Tennessee, U.S.. It was built in 1885 for Walter W. Morris, a banker and landowner. Morris served as the mayor of South Fulton in 1917. The house was inherited by his son, Thomas. It has been listed on the National Register of Historic Places since January 27, 1983.
