= Midway, Obion County, Tennessee =

Midway
- Unincorporated community
- Location within Tennessee Location within the United States
- Coordinates: 36°23′11″N 88°57′48″W
- Country: United States
- State: Tennessee
- County: Obion
- Elevation: 328 ft (100 m)
- Time zone: UTC-6 (Central (CST))
  - Summer (DST): UTC-5 (CDT)
- Area code: 731
- GNIS feature ID: 1293726

Midway is an unincorporated community in Obion County, Tennessee. Midway is located along Tennessee State Route 431, 5.8 miles (9.3 km) east-southeast of Union City.
