= Old Hickory Mall =

- Location: Jackson, Tennessee, United States
- Coordinates: 35.65658°N 88.83041°W
- Address: 2021 N. Highland Ave.
- Opened: 1967
- Developer: Hewitt Tomlin Jr., Francis Tigrett
- Owner: CBL & Associates Properties
- Num. of stores: 64
- Num. of anchor tenants: 4 (2 open, 2 vacant)
- Floor area: 542,475 sq ft (50,397.6 m^{2})
- Floors: 1 (2 in the former Macy's)
- Website: shopoldhickorymall.com

Old Hickory Mall is an enclosed shopping mall in Jackson, Tennessee. It is managed by CBL & Associates Properties. It opened as an open-air shopping center in 1967. The anchor stores are Belk and JCPenney; two other anchor spaces are vacant.

== History ==
Old Hickory Mall opened in 1967. It was developed by Hewitt Pegues Tomlin, Jr. and his sister, Francess Tigrett. The mall included a branch of Kisber's, a department store that had been a downtown Jackson fixture since 1906. Around 1978, the mall was enclosed, and a new Kisber's department store was built behind the mall's original one.

In 1985, Richard E. Jacobs Group acquired the mall. By this point, the mall's anchors alongside Kisber's included Memphis-based Goldsmith's, and national retailers J. C. Penney and Sears. By 1996, Kisber's had become Belk.

CBL & Associates Properties bought 21 malls from the Jacobs group in 2000, including Old Hickory. Changes that followed the CBL acquisition included an Abercrombie & Fitch store opening in 2003, displacing the food court; and a conversion of the mall's Goldsmith's store to Macy's in 2005. Despite the loss of the food court, as of 2013, there is a seating area and a handful of establishments to purchase food from.

On December 28, 2018, it was announced that Sears would be closing as part of a plan to close 80 stores nationwide; the store closed in March 2019.

On January 6, 2021, it was announced that Macy's would be closing that April as part of a plan to close 46 stores nationwide. Macy’s ended up shuttering its doors in March, a month early, leaving the Old Hickory Mall with only two of its four anchors remaining, Belk and JCPenney.
