= Milan, Tennessee =

- City
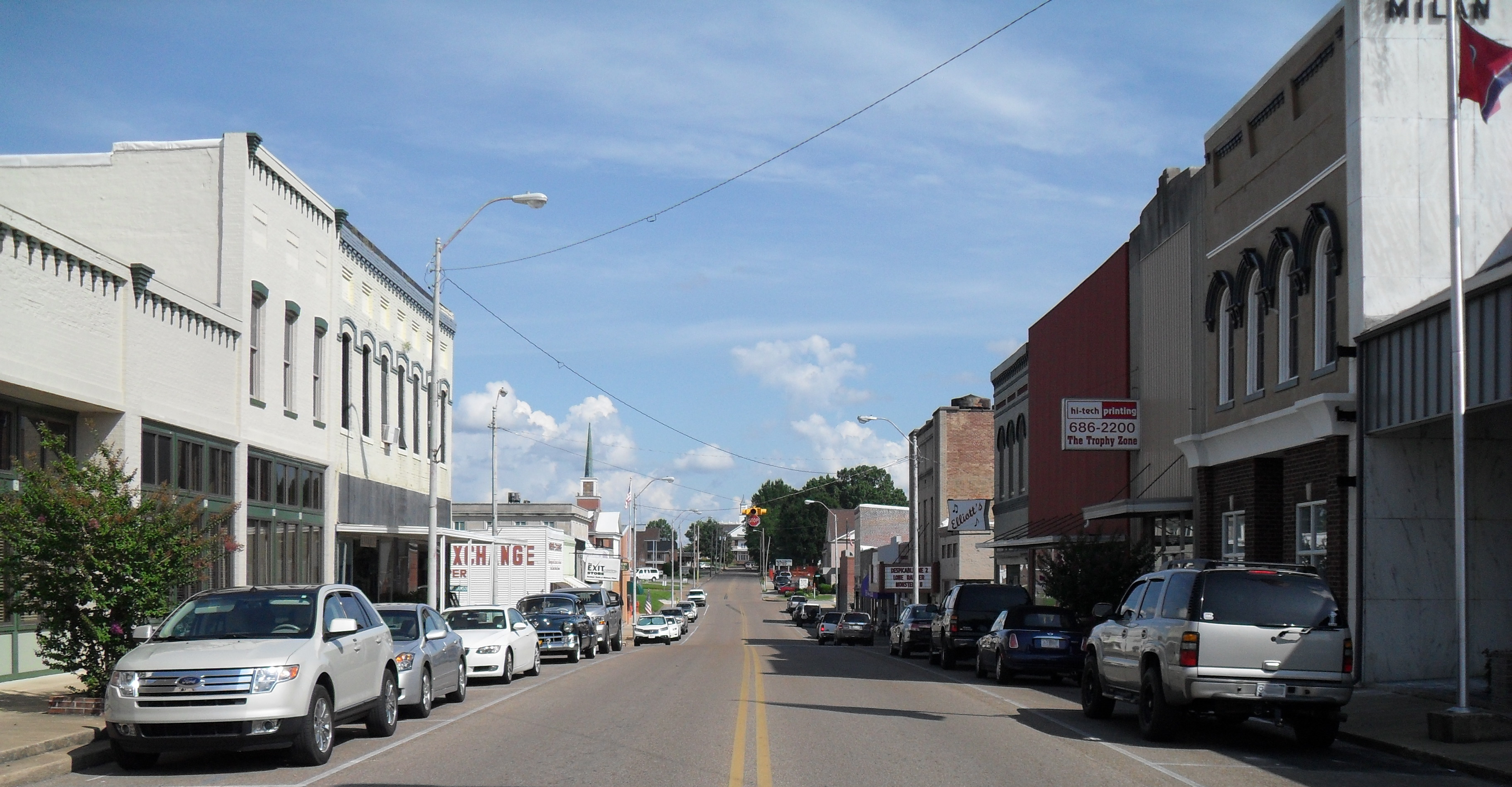
- Looking southeast along Main Street, May 2013

- Location of Milan in Gibson County, Tennessee.
- Coordinates: 35°54′57″N 88°45′29″W
- Country: United States
- State: Tennessee
- County: Gibson
- Founded: 1858
- Incorporated: 1866
- Named for: Milan, Italy

Government
  - Mayor: Billy Warren Beasley
  - Vice Mayor: James Fountain

Area
  - Total: 8.93 sq mi (23.14 km^{2})
  - Land: 8.93 sq mi (23.13 km^{2})
  - Water: 0.0039 sq mi (0.01 km^{2})
- Elevation: 423 ft (129 m)

Population (2020)
  - Total: 8,171
  - Density: 915.0/sq mi (353.28/km^{2})
- Time zone: UTC-6 (Central (CST))
  - Summer (DST): UTC-5 (CDT)
- ZIP code: 38358
- Area code: 731
- FIPS code: 47-48660
- GNIS feature ID: 1326833
- Website: https://cityofmilantn.com/

Milan (/ˈmaɪlɪn/ MY-lin) is the largest city in Gibson County, Tennessee, United States. As of the 2020 census, Milan had a population of 8,171. It is home to the Milan Army Ammunition Plant, the West Tennessee Agricultural Museum and several historical sites listed on the National Register of Historic Places (NRHP). The city was the first in Tennessee to begin no-till farming and to fluoridate its drinking water. The Milan Endowment for Growth in Academics (MEGA) was the first private community financial endowment for public schools in Tennessee.

== Name ==
Pronounced like "My-lunn", the local story is that the source for the name comes from an event in the 1850s. A Louisville & Nashville railroad surveyor asked Beverly A. Williamson: "Who owned the land?" and Williamson replied, "It's my land."

Residents of Milan are usually referred to as Milanites.

== Geography and climate ==
Milan is approximately 100 miles (160 km) Northeast of Memphis and 140 miles (230 km) West of Nashville, at an elevation of 424 feet (129 m) above sea level.

According to the United States Census Bureau, the city has a total area of 8.9 square miles (23 km^{2}), all land.

According to the Köppen climate classification, Milan has a humid subtropical climate, abbreviated as "Cfa". This is characterized by precipitation that is evenly distributed throughout the year and temperatures that are relatively high.

Climate data for Milan, Tennessee (1991–2020 normals, extremes 1883–present)
Month	Jan	Feb	Mar	Apr	May	Jun	Jul	Aug	Sep	Oct	Nov	Dec	Year
Record high °F (°C)	79 (26)	81 (27)	90 (32)	98 (37)	98 (37)	105 (41)	108 (42)	110 (43)	109 (43)	96 (36)	87 (31)	78 (26)	110 (43)
Mean maximum °F (°C)	69.6 (20.9)	73.1 (22.8)	80.6 (27.0)	86.2 (30.1)	90.3 (32.4)	95.3 (35.2)	97.3 (36.3)	97.8 (36.6)	94.2 (34.6)	87.7 (30.9)	79.0 (26.1)	71.1 (21.7)	99.0 (37.2)
Mean daily maximum °F (°C)	48.1 (8.9)	52.6 (11.4)	61.8 (16.6)	72.1 (22.3)	80.1 (26.7)	87.4 (30.8)	90.2 (32.3)	90.0 (32.2)	84.2 (29.0)	73.7 (23.2)	61.1 (16.2)	51.2 (10.7)	71.0 (21.7)
Daily mean °F (°C)	37.9 (3.3)	41.8 (5.4)	50.2 (10.1)	59.8 (15.4)	68.9 (20.5)	76.7 (24.8)	79.9 (26.6)	78.4 (25.8)	71.7 (22.1)	60.4 (15.8)	49.1 (9.5)	41.1 (5.1)	59.7 (15.4)
Mean daily minimum °F (°C)	27.7 (−2.4)	31.1 (−0.5)	38.7 (3.7)	47.4 (8.6)	57.8 (14.3)	66.0 (18.9)	69.6 (20.9)	66.9 (19.4)	59.3 (15.2)	47.2 (8.4)	37.0 (2.8)	30.9 (−0.6)	48.3 (9.1)
Mean minimum °F (°C)	9.1 (−12.7)	12.9 (−10.6)	19.6 (−6.9)	29.8 (−1.2)	40.9 (4.9)	52.4 (11.3)	57.8 (14.3)	55.1 (12.8)	42.6 (5.9)	29.3 (−1.5)	19.7 (−6.8)	13.6 (−10.2)	6.0 (−14.4)
Record low °F (°C)	−20 (−29)	−23 (−31)	2 (−17)	19 (−7)	32 (0)	40 (4)	47 (8)	43 (6)	31 (−1)	18 (−8)	1 (−17)	−14 (−26)	−23 (−31)
Average precipitation inches (mm)	4.16 (106)	4.70 (119)	5.32 (135)	5.27 (134)	6.24 (158)	4.39 (112)	4.30 (109)	3.70 (94)	4.20 (107)	3.68 (93)	4.79 (122)	5.43 (138)	56.18 (1,427)
Average snowfall inches (cm)	1.5 (3.8)	0.9 (2.3)	0.3 (0.76)	0.0 (0.0)	0.0 (0.0)	0.0 (0.0)	0.0 (0.0)	0.0 (0.0)	0.0 (0.0)	0.0 (0.0)	0.1 (0.25)	0.2 (0.51)	3.0 (7.6)
Average precipitation days (≥ 0.01 in)	11.0	10.5	11.9	11.1	11.7	9.6	9.6	7.9	6.8	8.1	10.2	11.6	120.0
Average snowy days (≥ 0.1 in)	1.1	0.9	0.3	0.0	0.0	0.0	0.0	0.0	0.0	0.0	0.1	0.3	2.7
Source: NOAA

== Demographics ==
Historical population
Census	Pop.	Note	%±
1880	1,600		—
1890	1,546		−3.4%
1900	1,682		8.8%
1910	1,605		−4.6%
1920	2,057		28.2%
1930	3,156		53.4%
1940	3,035		−3.8%
1950	4,938		62.7%
1960	5,208		5.5%
1970	7,313		40.4%
1980	8,083		10.5%
1990	7,512		−7.1%
2000	7,664		2.0%
2010	7,851		2.4%
2020	8,171		4.1%

=== 2020 census ===
As of the 2020 census, there was a population of 8,171, with 3,336 households and 1,955 families residing in the city, and the median age was 38.8 years. 24.8% of residents were under the age of 18 and 18.3% of residents were 65 years of age or older. For every 100 females there were 84.2 males, and for every 100 females age 18 and over there were 77.1 males age 18 and over.

The 3,336 households in Milan included 31.8% with children under the age of 18 living in them, 39.4% married-couple households, 17.2% households with a male householder and no spouse or partner present, and 37.2% households with a female householder and no spouse or partner present. About 31.5% of all households were made up of individuals and 13.9% had someone living alone who was 65 years of age or older.

There were 3,622 housing units, of which 7.9% were vacant. The homeowner vacancy rate was 1.9% and the rental vacancy rate was 6.5%.

92.3% of residents lived in urban areas, while 7.7% lived in rural areas.

Racial composition as of the 2020 census
Race	Number	Percent
White	5,638	69.0%
Black or African American	1,977	24.2%
American Indian and Alaska Native	26	0.3%
Asian	38	0.5%
Native Hawaiian and Other Pacific Islander	2	0.0%
Some other race	110	1.3%
Two or more races	380	4.7%
Hispanic or Latino (of any race)	247	3.0%

=== 2010 census ===
As of the 2010 United States census, there were 7,851 people, 3,183 households and 2,057 families residing in the city. The population density was 881.7 per square mile. There were 3,581 housing units. The racial makeup of the city was 73.50% White, 22.80% African American, 0.30% Native American, 0.40% Asian, 1.00% from other races, and 2.00% from two or more races. Hispanic or Latino of any race were 2.50% of the population.

There were 3,183 households, of which 34.5% had children under the age of 18 living with them, 41.3% were married couples living together, 18.7% had a female householder with no husband present, and 35.4% were non-families. 32.2% of all households were made up of individuals, and 15.7% had someone living alone who was 65 years of age or older. The average household size was 2.39 and the average family size was 3.00.

Age distribution was 26.5% under the age of 18, 55.7% from 18 to 64, and 17.9% who were 65 years of age or older. The median age was 38.9 years. 45.6% of the population was male, while 54.4% was female.

== Transportation ==
Milan is at the junction of U.S. Routes 45E and 79 (also known as U.S. Route 70A). State Route 104 also runs through the city. Unlike many cities in West Tennessee, there are no highway bypasses around the city.

Milan is connected to four Class I rail lines and is served by West Tennessee Railroad (formerly Illinois Central, then Norfolk Southern). Milan's elevation of 424 feet (129 m) is the highest point between the Great Lakes and the Gulf of Mexico on the former Illinois Central Railroad.

Milan was also served by the L&N Railroad on its Memphis to Bowling Green line, which is now the CSX Memphis Subdivision.

== History ==
In 1858, the city of Milan was established on the lands of B. A. Williamson and John Sanford; a small house was erected and a grocery opened by John G. Shepherd. The following year, the U.S. Post Office in Shady Grove was transferred to Milan. The first physicians, W. R. Rooks and J. B. Hinson, arrived in 1860.

In 1866, Milan was incorporated by an act of the Tennessee Legislature; John G. Shepherd was the first mayor. The Milan Times, Milan's first newspaper, was established in 1869; it was continued for only a few months.

In 1873, the completion of the Illinois Central Railroad brought importance to the town as a commercial point. The following year, W. A. Wade established the Milan Exchange newspaper. The Grand Pacific Hotel was erected at the railway junction in 1878.

In 1941, Clemmer Clinic became the city's first acute care facility. In the same year, construction began on the Wolf Creek Ordinance Plant and the Milan Ordinance Depot; these facilities merged in 1945 to become the Milan Arsenal. In 1949, Milan organized the first little league team in the mid-south.

In 1950, the Milan National Guard became one of the first two in the nation to be federalized into active duty for the Korean War. In 1951, led by Dr. Robert P. Denney, Milan became the first city in Tennessee, second in the Southeast, to fluoridate its drinking water.

In 1965, the Milan Mirror newspaper was founded. The paper merged with the Milan Exchange in 1977 to become the Milan Mirror-Exchange.

In 1981, the University of Tennessee Agricultural Experimentation Station in Milan became the birthplace of no-till farming in Tennessee.

=== Historical sites ===
The City of Milan is home to several historical sites listed on the NRHP.

- On June 28, 1974, the Browning House, located on the Milan Army Ammunition Plant, was added to the National Register of Historic Places.
- On July 5, 1985, Union Central School, located on Union Central Rd., was added to the NRHP.
- On July 9, 1987, the Milan Post Office, located at 382 S. Main St., was added to the NRHP. The Post Office was built by Algernon Blair, inc.
- On March 12, 2012, the Gibson County Training School, located at 1041 S. Harris St., was added to the NRHP.

== Local government ==
Milan has a mayor-board of aldermen form of government. The mayor serves a four-year term. There are four wards, each of which elects two aldermen. The city's monthly meeting of mayor and board of aldermen is open to the public and held every second Tuesday in Milan's city hall, located downtown.

=== City services ===
Water, sewer, and electricity are provided by the city through Milan Public Utilities. Drinking water is extracted from a well field. Electricity is obtained from the Tennessee Valley Authority. Natural gas is provided by the Gibson County Utility District.

Milan provides its own Fire Department, Police Department, and Municipal Court.

Milan has a large, modern city park located on State Route 104. The park has a 10 station fitness course, several sports fields & courts, playgrounds, reservable pavilions and swimming pool, and a saddle club arena. The park is home to the Bobby Ross Amphitheater.

The Mildred G. Fields Library contains 35,000 volumes and is housed in a building on Van Hook Street.

The city cemetery, Oakwood Cemetery, is located on South First Street near Highland Avenue and Ellington Drive.

The U.S. Post Office building is located on Main Street near city hall.

=== Privately owned services ===
The city is served by Milan General Hospital, a 70-bed acute care facility located on Highland Avenue. Milan General Hospital became a wholly owned affiliate of West Tennessee Healthcare in 1998.

Milan has a weekly newspaper, the Milan Mirror-Exchange.

The B.D. Bryant Memorial Library, located on First Street, houses a collection of over 2000 historical religious books. This privately owned library is open to the public.

Two radio stations are licensed in Milan. WHHG (92.3 FM) is a classic rock station. W256AD (99.1 FM) is an American Family Radio station.

A YMCA is located adjacent to the city park.

The Milan Golf and Country Club, a private club, has an 18-hole course.

Milan has no television station, but is within the reach of Jackson and Memphis stations. A cable television service is provided by Charter Communications.

== Education ==
Public education in Milan is provided by the Milan Special School District, which was formed in the 1980s and includes territory immediately adjacent to the Milan city limits. The district is the successor to the Milan City Schools, formed in the 1960s when the Milan schools left the Gibson County Board of Education and became independent. The system is accredited by the Southern Association of Colleges and Schools.

There are three schools: Milan High School (which contains the Milan Vo-Tech center) serving grades 9–12, Milan Middle, serving grades 5–8, and Milan Elementary, serving grades K-4. Historically, there were four schools - K.D. McKellar, grades 1–8, Park Avenue, also grades 1–8, Milan High School, 9–12, and Polk-Clark, which served black students in all twelve grades. The McKellar and Park Avenue buildings were demolished; Polk-Clark is now a community center.

Family, Career and Community Leaders of America (FCCLA) is one of the active CTE student organizations which is composed of students in Family and Consumer Science courses. There have been 4 state officers from Milan High and many state and national competitive event winners.

The Milan High School Alumni Association (MHSAA) holds Alumni Day on the third Saturday in June each year. In 2012 the MHSAA presented 19 scholarships totalling over $18,000, and hosted 14 scholarships totalling over $16,500 to graduating seniors that were the natural, adopted, or stepchildren of alumni.

Established in 1989, the Milan Endowment for Growth in Academics (MEGA), is Tennessee's first private community financial endowment for public education. Proceeds provide public school students with opportunities not covered by the school budget. Only the income of the fund is spent. The principal is kept intact to yield proceeds for future years. During the period of 1990–2012, MEGA has disbursed 663 grants totalling $455,439. In 2012, the total amount of the endowment reached $580,000.

== West Tennessee Agricultural Museum ==
Milan is the site of the West Tennessee Agricultural Museum which is a part of the University of Tennessee Agricultural Experiment Station located in Milan. The museum contains more than 2,600 artifacts and farm tools from the local agrarian culture.

The University of Tennessee Agricultural Experiment Station conducts crop research, crop management and erosion control experiments. The no-till method of farming in Tennessee originated at the Milan facility.

The station is host of the Milan No Till-Field Day, an agricultural demonstration event held on the fourth Thursday of July in even-numbered years. This event draws visitors from around the world.

The Buford Ellington 4-H Club Training Center was located at the station until the center was closed in 2009.

== Milan Army Ammunition Plant ==
In 1945, the Wolf Creek Ordinance Plant and the Milan Ordance Depot combined to become the Milan Arsenal, renamed the Milan Army Ammunition Plant in the 1960s. The combined facility included 88 miles of railroad track and 231 miles of roadway across a 36 square miles (93 km^{2}) tract of land.

In 2008, American Ordnance, the private contractor operating the plant, began the process of moving operations to Iowa and commercializing the Milan Army Ammunition Plant. By March 2013, employment had fallen to 110.

The Milan Army Ammunition Plant is nicknamed "Bullet Town" by locals.

=== Attributed population growth ===
The Milan Army Ammunition Plant employed over 10,000 during World War II, dropping to 1,500 in 1947. Employment rose again to over 8,000 during the Korean War before falling to less than 500 in 1959. By 1968, employment had risen again to 7,000. During the period 1940–1971 the population of Milan had increased from 3,000 to 7,000. The growth was largely attributed to the Milan Army Ammunition Plant.

In a 1944 article, the Saturday Evening Post, in discussing the boom created by the Milan Arsenal during World War II, predicted Milan would become a "ghost town" when the war was over.

=== National Priorities List inclusion ===
In 1987, the Environmental Protection Agency (EPA) placed the Milan Army Ammunition Plant on the National Priorities List. Contamination of the city's groundwater in the Memphis Sand Aquifer of 2,4,6-trinitrotoluene (TNT) and RDX was of particular concern.

In 1989, the EPA, United States Army and Tennessee Department of Environment and Conservation (TDEC) signed a Federal Facilities Agreement (FFA) for the site. The FFA ensures that the parties would fully investigate environmental impacts associated with past and present activities at the installation and complete appropriate cleanup actions through established schedules and enforceable milestones.

In the early 1990s, the United States Army financed the relocation of the city's drinking water well field. The United States Army implemented institutional controls to prohibit groundwater use in contaminated areas.

In 2010, the third Five-Year Review found that the cleanup activities were protecting people and the environment.

In 2013, the United States Army submitted its Site-wide Feasibility Study to the EPA for approval. The cleanup of affected soil was completed leaving the cleanup and long-term care of the groundwater contamination plume. The velocities of the plume vary, but the direction is primarily North towards the Rutherford Fork of the Obion River and from the Northwest boundary towards the city.

The long-term care of the groundwater contamination plume is expected to last through 2075 when contamination is expected to be below the EPA required two parts per billion.

== Sports ==
In 1923, Milan shared the Milan-Trenton Twins, a Minor League Baseball team of the Kentucky–Illinois–Tennessee League, with nearby Trenton.

== Notable people ==
=== Politics and academia ===
- A. P. Barrett, Texas politician and businessman
- Mary Lee (Harris) Cagle, one of the first influential women and pastors of the Church of the Nazarene. In 1894, she helped found a 14-member New Testament Church of Christ in Milan.
- Gordon Browning, the Governor of Tennessee 1937–1939 and 1949–1953. His childhood home is located on the grounds of the Milan Army Ammunition Plant.
- Kelsie Brown Harder, the onomastician expert and director of the Place Name Survey of the United States. In 1942, Harder was employed by the U.S. Department of War, in Milan.
- Andrew 'Andy' Holt, the 16th president of the University of Tennessee 1959–1970, was born in Milan.

=== Sports ===
- Benjamin Caldwell Cantwell, the major league baseball pitcher, was born in Milan April 13, 1902.
- Burnis 'Wild Bill' Wright, the Negro league baseball pitcher and outfielder, was born in Milan June 6, 1914.
- Avery Williamson, former NFL player.

=== Entertainment ===
- Joe Staton, the illustrator and writer of comic books such as E-Man, graduated from Milan High School in 1966.
- Kellye Cash-Sheppard, the 1986 Miss Tennessee and 1987 Miss America turned musical artist, resides in Milan.

== See also ==
- List of cities in Tennessee
