= Sharon, Tennessee =

- Town
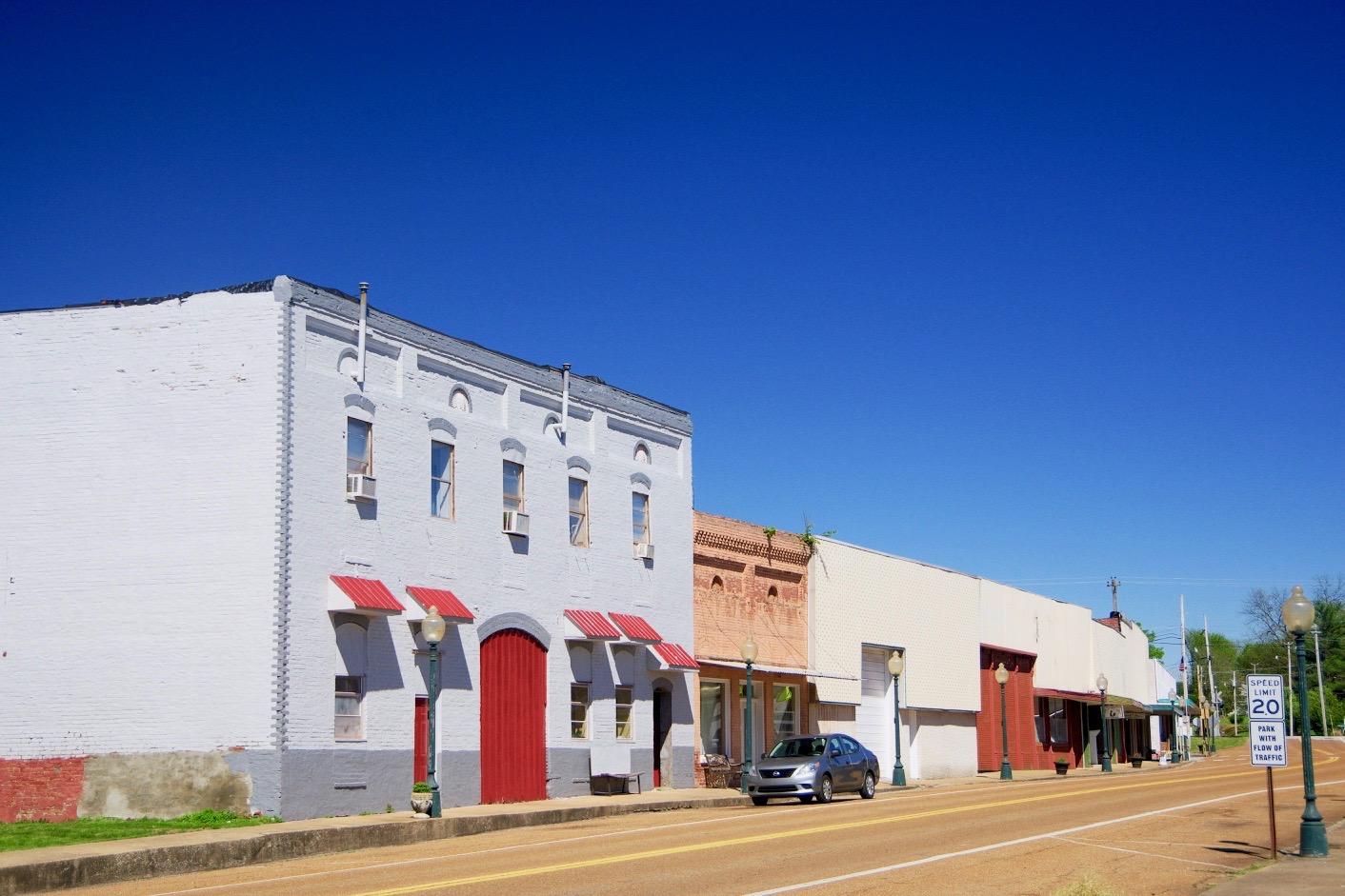
- Buildings along Main Street (SR 89)

- Location of Sharon in Weakley County, Tennessee
- Coordinates: 36°14′0″N 88°49′30″W
- Country: United States
- State: Tennessee
- County: Weakley
- Settled: 1820s
- Incorporated: 1901

Area
  - Total: 1.27 sq mi (3.29 km^{2})
  - Land: 1.27 sq mi (3.29 km^{2})
  - Water: 0 sq mi (0.00 km^{2})
- Elevation: 417 ft (127 m)

Population (2020)
  - Total: 935
  - Density: 736.2/sq mi (284.25/km^{2})
- Time zone: UTC-6 (Central (CST))
  - Summer (DST): UTC-5 (CDT)
- ZIP code: 38255
- Area code: 731
- FIPS code: 47-67540
- GNIS feature ID: 1301244

Sharon is a town in Weakley County, Tennessee, United States. The population was 988 at the 2000 census and 944 at the 2010 census. By the 2020 census, the population had decreased to 935.

== Geography ==
Sharon is located at 36°14′0″N 88°49′30″W (36.233268, -88.825000).

According to the United States Census Bureau, the town has a total area of 1.1 square miles (2.8 km^{2}), all land.

Sharon also includes an elementary and middle school, located near the center of town.

== Demographics ==
Historical population
Census	Pop.	Note	%±
1910	608		—
1920	506		−16.8%
1930	596		17.8%
1940	586		−1.7%
1950	880		50.2%
1960	966		9.8%
1970	1,188		23.0%
1980	1,134		−4.5%
1990	1,047		−7.7%
2000	988		−5.6%
2010	944		−4.5%
2020	935		−1.0%

As of the 2000 census, there were 988 people, 446 households, and 300 families residing in the town. The population density was 857.3 inhabitants per square mile (331.0/km^{2}). There were 490 housing units at an average density of 425.2 per square mile (164.2/km^{2}). The racial makeup of the town was:

- 89.17% White
- 10.22% African American
- 0.10% Pacific Islander
- 0.40% from other races
- 0.10% from two or more races

Hispanic or Latino of any race made up 0.40% of the population.

=== Households and families ===
Of the 446 households:

- 23.3% had children under the age of 18 living with them.
- 55.6% were married couples living together.
- 9.2% had a female householder with no husband present.
- 32.7% were non-families.

Additionally, 29.6% of all households were made up of individuals, and 19.1% had someone living alone who was 65 years of age or older. The average household size was 2.22, and the average family size was 2.73.

=== Population distribution ===
The population was distributed as follows:

- 19.4% under the age of 18
- 6.4% aged 18 to 24
- 24.9% aged 25 to 44
- 26.8% aged 45 to 64
- 22.5% aged 65 or older

The median age was 44 years. For every 100 females, there were 93.7 males. For every 100 females aged 18 and over, there were 87.7 males.

=== Income and poverty ===
The median income for a household in the town was $27,639, and the median income for a family was $39,643. Males had a median income of $29,018 compared to $17,708 for females. The per capita income for the town was $15,746.

Approximately:

- 11.3% of families
- 12.7% of the population

were below the poverty line, including 15.3% of those under age 18 and 16.0% of those aged 65 or over.

== Media ==
- WWGY 99.3 "Today's Best Music with "Ace & TJ in the Morning"
- WRQR-FM 105.5 "Today's Best Music with "Ace & TJ in the Morning"
- WTPR-AM 710 "The Greatest Hits of All Time"
