= List of U.S. Highways in Tennessee =

U.S. Routes of the State Route System
- Highway markers for U.S. Highway 70 and U.S. Highway 321

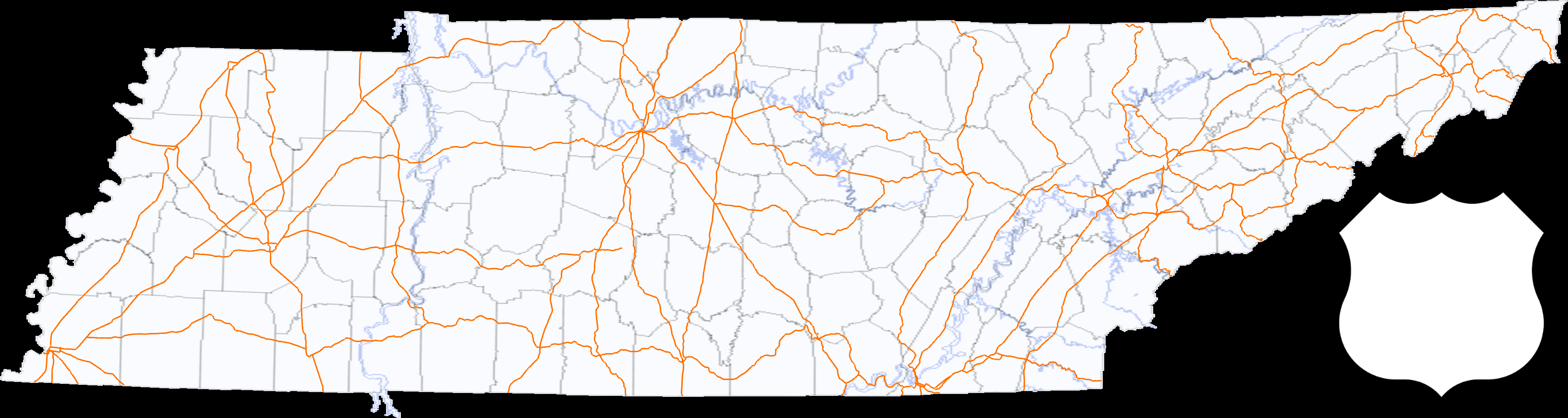
- U.S Highways in Tennessee highlighted in yellow

System information
- Maintained by TDOT

Highway names
- Interstates: Interstate XX (I-XX)
- US Highways: U.S. Route XX (US XX)
- State: State Route XX (SR XX)

System links
- Tennessee State Routes; Interstate; US; State

The U.S. Highways in Tennessee are the segments of the United States Numbered Highway System that are maintained by the Tennessee Department of Transportation (TDOT) in the state of Tennessee. All of these highways in Tennessee have a state highway designation routed concurrently along them, though the state highway is hidden and only signed along the green mile marker signs that display mileage within each county.

== U.S. Highways ==
Number	Length (mi)	Length (km)	Southern or western terminus	Northern or eastern terminus	Formed	Removed	Notes
US 11	124.86	200.94	US 11 (Georgia state line) – Chattanooga	US 11E / US 11W / US 70 – Knoxville	1926	current	
US 11W	109.16	175.68	US 11 / US 11E / US 70 – Knoxville	US 11W / US 421 (Virginia state line) – Bristol	1929	current	
US 11E	120.36	193.70	US 11 / US 11W / US 70 – Knoxville	US 11E (Virginia state line) – Bristol	1929	current	
US 19	11.63	18.72	US 11E / US 19W / US 19E – Bluff City	US 11E (Virginia state line) / US 19 – Bristol	1930	current	
US 19W	40.69	65.48	US 19W (North Carolina state line) in Unicoi County	US 11E / US 19 / US 19E – Bluff City	1930	current	
US 19E	30.98	49.86	US 19E (North Carolina state line) near Roan Mountain	US 11E / US 19 / US 19W – Bluff City	1930	current	
US 23	57.38	92.34	I-26 / US 23 (North Carolina state line) in Unicoi County	US 23 (Virginia state line) – Kingsport	1931	current	
US 25	20.14	32.41	US 25 / US 70 (North Carolina state line) near Del Rio	US 25W / US 25E / US 70 – Newport	1926	current	
US 25W	110.03	177.08	US 25 / US 25E / US 70 – Newport	US 25W (Kentucky state line) – Jellico	1926	current	
US 25E	63.24	101.77	US 25 / US 25W / US 70 – Newport	US 25E (Kentucky state line) – Cumberland Gap	1926	current	
US 27	144.8	233.0	US 27 (Georgia state line) – Chattanooga	US 27 (Kentucky state line) – Winfield	1928	current	
US 31	93.01	149.69	I-65 / US 31 (Alabama state line) – Ardmore	US 31W / US 31E / US 41 / US 431 – Nashville	1926	current	
US 31W	36.08	58.07	US 31 / US 31E / US 41 / US 431 – Nashville	US 31W (Kentucky state line) – Portland	1926	current	
US 31E	50.38	81.08	US 31 / US 31W / US 41 / US 431 – Nashville	US 31E / US 231 (Kentucky state line) near Westmoreland	1926	current	
US 41	194.58	313.15	US 41 / US 76 (Georgia state line) – East Ridge	US 41 (Kentucky state line) near Adams	1926	current	
US 43	58.2	93.7	US 43 (Alabama state line) – Saint Joseph	US 31 / US 412 – Columbia	1939	current	
US 45	60.95	98.09	US 45 (Mississippi state line) – Guys	US 45W / US 45E – Three Way	1926	current	
US 45	0.45	0.72	US 45W / US 45E / US 51 – South Fulton	US 45 / US 51 (Kentucky state line) – South Fulton	1926	current	
US 45W	62.33	100.31	US 45 / US 45E – Three Way	US 45 / US 45E / US 51 – South Fulton	1926	current	
US 45E	61.23	98.54	US 45 / US 45W – Three Way	US 45 / US 45W / US 51 – South Fulton	1926	current	
US 51	135.18	217.55	US 51 (Mississippi state line) – Memphis	US 45 / US 51 (Kentucky state line) – South Fulton	1926	current	
US 58	0.8	1.3	US 25E – Cumberland Gap	US 58 (Virginia state line) – Cumberland Gap	1996	current	Was originally 25E
US 61	11.82	19.02	US 61 (Mississippi state line) – Memphis	I-55 / US 61 / US 64 / US 70 / US 78 / US 79 (AR state line) – Memphis	1926	current	
US 63	—	—	US 61 / US 64 / US 70 / US 79 in Memphis	US 61 / US 63 / US 64 / US 70 / US 79 at the Arkansas state line at West Memphis	1949	1999	
US 64	404.1	650.3	I-55 / US 61 / US 64 / US 70 / US 78 / US 79 (AR state line) – Memphis	US 64 / US 74 (North Carolina state line) near Ducktown	1933	current	
US 70	478.48	770.04	I-55 / US 61 / US 64 / US 70 / US 78 / US 79 (AR state line) – Memphis	US 25 / US 70 (North Carolina state line) near Del Rio	1926	current	
US 70N	87.24	140.40	US 70 – Lebanon	US 127 – Crossville	1939	current	
US 70S	112.96	181.79	US 70 – Nashville	US 70 – Sparta	1939	current	
US 72	25.63	41.25	US 51 / US 64 / US 70 / US 79 – Memphis	US 72 (Mississippi state line) – Collierville	1926	current	
US 72	35.02	56.36	US 72 (Alabama state line) – South Pittsburgh	US 41 – Chattanooga	1926	current	
US 74	62.83	101.12	I-24 / I-75 – Chattanooga	US 64 / US 74 (North Carolina state line) near Ducktown	1987	current	
US 76	9.46	15.22	US 41 / US 72 – Chattanooga	US 41 / US 76 (Georgia state line) – East Ridge	1932	current	
US 78	15.00	24.14	I-55 / US 61 / US 64 / US 70 / US 78 / US 79 (AR state line) – Memphis	US 78 (Mississippi state line) – Memphis	1926	current	
US 79	209.83	337.69	I-55 / US 61 / US 64 / US 70 / US 78 / US 79 (AR state line) – Memphis	US 79 (Kentucky state line) near Clarksville	1944	current	
US 127	136.67	219.95	US 27 – Chattanooga	US 127 (Kentucky state line) – Static	1958	current	
US 129	52.8	85.0	US 129 (North Carolina state line) near Tallassee	I-40 – Knoxville	1935	current	
US 231	121.15	194.97	US 231 / US 431 (Alabama state line) near Fayetteville	US 31E / US 231 (Kentucky state line) near Westmoreland	1952	current	
US 321	194.50	313.02	I-40 near Oak Ridge	US 321 (North Carolina state line) near Butler	1961	current	
US 411	120.84	194.47	US 411 (Georgia state line) in Polk County	US 25W / US 70 – Newport	1940	current	
US 412	181.93	292.79	I-155 / US 412 (Missouri state line) near Dyersburg	I-65 – Columbia	1932	current	
US 421	43.4	69.8	US 421 (North Carolina state line) – Trade	US 421 (Virginia state line) – Bristol	1932	current	
US 431	130.68	210.31	US 231 / US 431 (Alabama state line) near Fayetteville	US 431 (Kentucky state line) near Springfield	1954	current	
US 441	83.28	134.03	US 441 (North Carolina state line) – Newfound Gap	US 25W – Lake City	1952	current	
US 511	120.36	193.70	Bristol	Strawberry Plains	1926	1929	Now US 11E
US 641	95.87	154.29	US 64 – Clifton Junction	US 641 (Kentucky state line) near Puryear	1955	current	
Former

== Special routes ==
Number	Length (mi)	Length (km)	Southern or western terminus	Northern or eastern terminus	Formed	Removed	Notes
US 31A	76.94	123.82	US 31 – Pulaski	US 31 / US 41 / US 41A / US 70S – Nashville	1926	current	
US 41A	157.87	254.07	US 41 – Monteagle	US 41 Alt. (Kentucky state line) – Clarksville	1926	current	
US 70A	61.7	99.3	US 70 / US 79 – Brownsville	US 70 – Huntingdon	1926	current	
