= South Fulton, Tennessee =

- City
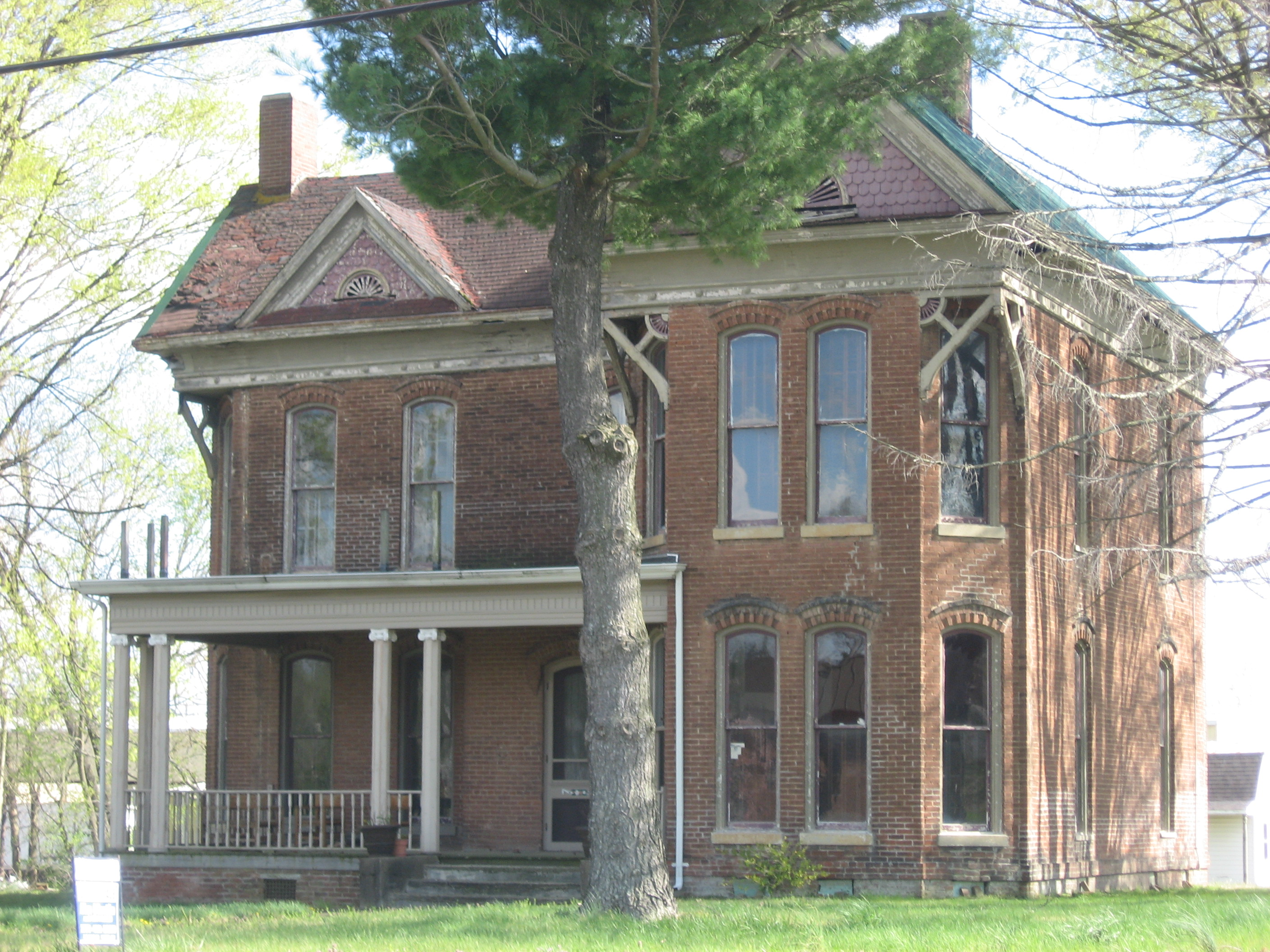
- The W.W. Morris House, a historic site on State Line Road

- Location of South Fulton in Obion County, Tennessee.
- Coordinates: 36°29′48″N 88°52′45″W
- Country: United States
- State: Tennessee
- County: Obion

Government
  - Mayor: Kent Greer

Area
  - Total: 3.38 sq mi (8.76 km^{2})
  - Land: 3.38 sq mi (8.76 km^{2})
  - Water: 0 sq mi (0.00 km^{2})
- Elevation: 354 ft (108 m)

Population (2020)
  - Total: 2,245
  - Density: 663.7/sq mi (256.25/km^{2})
- Time zone: UTC-6 (Central (CST))
  - Summer (DST): UTC-5 (CDT)
- ZIP code: 38257
- Area code: 731
- FIPS code: 47-69900
- GNIS feature ID: 1303727
- Website: https://www.southfultontn.com/

South Fulton is a city in Obion County, Tennessee, United States. The population was 2,245 at the 2020 census. It is part of the Union City, TN–KY Micropolitan Statistical Area.

== Geography ==
South Fulton is located at 36°29′48″N 88°52′45″W (36.496716, -88.879193).

According to the United States Census Bureau, the city has a total area of 3.1 square miles (8.0 km^{2}), all land.

== Demographics ==
Historical population
Census	Pop.	Note	%±
1880	284		—
1890	623		119.4%
1900	455		−27.0%
1910	1,391		205.7%
1920	1,650		18.6%
1930	1,988		20.5%
1940	2,050		3.1%
1950	2,119		3.4%
1960	2,512		18.5%
1970	3,122		24.3%
1980	2,735		−12.4%
1990	2,688		−1.7%
2000	2,517		−6.4%
2010	2,354		−6.5%
2020	2,245		−4.6%

=== 2020 census ===
As of the 2020 census, South Fulton had a population of 2,245. The median age was 43.5 years, 22.7% of residents were under the age of 18, and 22.2% were 65 years of age or older. For every 100 females there were 86.8 males, and for every 100 females age 18 and over there were 86.0 males age 18 and over.

85.7% of residents lived in urban areas, while 14.3% lived in rural areas.

There were 1,008 households in South Fulton, of which 28.5% had children under the age of 18 living in them. Of all households, 37.4% were married-couple households, 19.5% were households with a male householder and no spouse or partner present, and 37.1% were households with a female householder and no spouse or partner present. About 34.8% of all households were made up of individuals and 16.8% had someone living alone who was 65 years of age or older.

There were 1,132 housing units, of which 11.0% were vacant. The homeowner vacancy rate was 1.7% and the rental vacancy rate was 8.3%.

Racial composition as of the 2020 census
Race	Number	Percent
White	1,799	80.1%
Black or African American	330	14.7%
American Indian and Alaska Native	7	0.3%
Asian	3	0.1%
Native Hawaiian and Other Pacific Islander	0	0.0%
Some other race	11	0.5%
Two or more races	95	4.2%
Hispanic or Latino (of any race)	35	1.6%

=== 2000 census ===
As of the census of 2000, there was a population of 2,517, with 1,081 households and 729 families residing in the city. The population density was 814.4 inhabitants per square mile (314.4/km^{2}). There were 1,199 housing units at an average density of 388.0 units per square mile (149.8 units/km^{2}). The racial makeup of the city was 78.98% White, 19.47% African American, 0.28% Native American, 0.12% Asian, 0.20% from other races, and 0.95% from two or more races. Hispanic or Latino of any race were 0.56% of the population.

There were 1,081 households, out of which 27.3% had children under the age of 18 living with them, 48.2% were married couples living together, 15.6% had a female householder with no husband present, and 32.5% were non-families. 30.0% of all households were made up of individuals, and 16.2% had someone living alone who was 65 years of age or older. The average household size was 2.30 and the average family size was 2.83.

In the city, the population was spread out, with 22.9% under the age of 18, 7.8% from 18 to 24, 24.5% from 25 to 44, 25.5% from 45 to 64, and 19.3% who were 65 years of age or older. The median age was 42 years. For every 100 females, there were 85.9 males. For every 100 females age 18 and over, there were 83.8 males.

The median income for a household in the city was $27,462, and the median income for a family was $35,608. Males had a median income of $27,458 versus $20,212 for females. The per capita income for the city was $15,983. About 15.0% of families and 16.0% of the population were below the poverty line, including 22.2% of those under age 18 and 18.1% of those age 65 or over.

== Twin City ==
South Fulton is considered a twin city with Fulton, Kentucky. Together, they used to host the International Banana Festival in celebration of the fact that the twin cities railroad maintained an icing station for a large percentage of bananas en route to northern destinations arriving from New Orleans. A two-ton banana pudding was marched through a parade and served at the end of the parade route.

Recently this Banana Festival was brought back in 2011. In 2012, they had the 50th anniversary of the Banana Festival. This festival occurs towards the end of September and includes the pudding, seller booths, and concessions.

== History ==
South Fulton was first known as Jacksonville due to the fact that land in the area once belonged to Andrew Jackson. It is recorded that Andrew Jackson sold 1,000 acres (400 hectares) in northeast Weakley County in 1823. Jacksonville existed from about 1859 until 1895 when South Fulton was first chartered.

== Education ==
It is in the Obion County Schools.

== "Pay for Spray" controversy ==
Starting in the early 1990s, South Fulton adopted a policy of allowing people outside the city limits to be protected by the fire department, in return for a $75 annual fee. But unlike neighboring towns, which would even protect someone who had not paid (while charging them a larger fee covering expenses), South Fulton would simply refuse to help anyone not on a list as having paid up.

In 2010, a member of the Cranick family of Obion County was burning trash near the family home, when it got out of control and caught the house on fire. They called 911, but the fire department refused to respond, because the Cranicks weren't on the list as having paid the tax. Understanding the premise of the free rider problem, Gene Cranick offered to pay the full cost of the department responding, but was refused. The South Fulton Fire Department did show up, but refrained from helping, only protecting the property of a neighbor who had paid the tax. The Cranicks lost three dogs and the family cat, along with the house and most of their possessions.

In 2011 this happened again, with Vicky Bell, the homeowner, reporting that the fire department actually pulled up and watched, but did not help.

This policy has been decried by media nationally, including Keith Olbermann, and Harold Schaitberger, president of the International Association of Fire Fighters, who said "Professional, career firefighters shouldn’t be forced to check a list before running out the door to see which homeowners have paid up...They get in their trucks and go."

Conversely, this policy was defended by some, including Glenn Beck and the National Review

Two years after this controversy started, the city of South Fulton changed their policy. Going forward, any homeowner who didn't pay the $75 tax must pay $3,500 per call.
