= Tennessee State Route 211 =

State highway in Tennessee, United States

State Route 211
- SR 211 highlighted in red

Route information
- Maintained by TDOT
- Length: 17.23 mi (27.73 km)
- Existed: July 1, 1983–present

Major junctions
- South end: US 51 / US 51 Bus. in Dyersburg
- SR 104 in Dyersburg; US 412 in Dyersburg; SR 77 in Newbern
- North end: SR 105 in Trimble

Location
- Country: United States
- State: Tennessee
- Counties: Dyer

Highway system
- Tennessee State Routes; Interstate; US; State
← SR 210	→ SR 212

State Route 211 (SR 211) is a 17.23-mile (27.73 km) secondary state route in Dyer County, Tennessee, United States, that previously extended north into Obion County. SR 211 is a two-lane highway throughout its length except for a short section in northern Dyersburg.

== Route description ==
The southern terminus of SR 211 is at a large 3-way junction with US 51 / SR 3 just south southern Dyersburg. SR 211 begins as an unsigned route concurrent with US 51 Business inside the city limits of Dyersburg. SR 211 briefly overlaps with SR 104 near downtown Dyersburg and with US 51 on the north side of the city. The route in this area is mostly a two-lane facility with a few four-lane and five-lane sections with a maximum speed limit of 50 miles per hour (80 km/h). North of Dyersburg, SR 211 is constructed as a two-lane route and is predominantly rural in nature. This route passes through downtown Newbern and intersects SR 77 before continuing north toward Trimble. The northern terminus of SR 211 is at Trimble at a 4-way at-grade intersection with SR 105. North of this intersection, old SR 211 continues north but is closed to traffic. This old alignment provides access to the C.M. Gooch Wildlife Management Area maintained by the Tennessee Wildlife Resources Agency.

== History ==
SR 211 is part of an older alignment of US 51 and SR 3.

In the past, SR 211 continued north past Trimble with a historic northern terminus at the US 51 freeway just south of Troy. Tennessee Department of Transportation ended state maintenance on the section of this highway between Trimble and Obion due to the deteriorated nature of the bridges along this section of roadway and the derelict Adkison Memorial Bridge over the Obion River that has been closed for a number of years. This orphaned northern portion of SR 211 was eventually deleted and resigned as an extended SR 183. This highway represents the old two-lane alignment of US 51 between Dyersburg and Troy. North of Troy the old two-lane alignment of US 51 resumes and is currently signed as SR 184 and runs to Union City.

County maps published by TDOT do not show the recent realignment of this highway, however, the Official Transportation Map and signs erected in the field reflect the change as stated above. For several years, SR 211 was detoured off its alignment using SR 105, US 51, and SR 183 to avoid the closed section of roadway roughly from the Obion County line at Trimble north to Obion. The detour around this section of highway was removed when SR 211 was truncated to SR 105.

== Major intersections ==
County	Location	mi	km	Destinations	Notes
Dyer	Dyersburg	0.0	0.0	US 51 (51-Bypass South/SR 3) / US 51 Bus. begin – Halls	Southern terminus of SR 211 and US 51 Business; southern end of unsigned US 51 Business concurrency; SR 211 begins as an unsigned highway
Dyer	Dyersburg	1.7	2.7	Bridge over the North Fork of the Forked Deer River	
Dyer	Dyersburg	1.9	3.1	SR 104 east (East Court Street) – Trenton	Southern end of SR 104 concurrency
Dyer	Dyersburg	2.1	3.4	SR 104 west (McGaughey Street) – Finley	Northern end of SR 104 concurrency
Dyer	Dyersburg	3.9	6.3	US 51 south (US 51 Bypass/SR 3 south) / US 51 Bus. end – Halls	Southern end of unsigned US 51 concurrency; northern terminus of US 51 Business
Dyer	Dyersburg	5.5	8.9	US 51 north / US 412 (SR 3 north/SR 20) to I-155 / Future I-69 – Union City, Jackson, St. Louis, MO	Northern end of unsigned US 51/SR 3 concurrency; Parclo Interchange; SR 211 becomes signed
Dyer	Newbern	11.8	19.0	SR 77 to Future I-69 / US 51 – Dyersburg, Yorkville, Dyer	Access to FUTURE I-69/US 51 via SR 77 west
Dyer	Trimble	17.1	27.5	SR 105 (County Line Street) to Future I-69 / US 51 – Rutherford, Union City, South Fulton	Northern terminus of SR 211; Access to FUTURE I-69/US 51 via SR 105 west; SR 211 ends as a signed highway; former SR 211 continues north as Old State Highway 3
Obion				Adkison Memorial Bridge over Obion River	
Obion	Obion			SR 183 north (Palestine Avenue) – Hornbeak	Former southern terminus of SR 183; SR 183 now follows former SR 211 alignment north (south)
Obion	Troy			US 51 (Jere B Ford Memorial Highway/SR 3) – Dyersburg, Troy, Union City	Former northern terminus of SR 211; now southern terminus of SR 183
1.000 mi = 1.609 km; 1.000 km = 0.621 mi: Concurrency terminus

== See also ==
- List of highways numbered 211
