= Tennessee State Route 21 =

State highway in Tennessee, United States

State Route 21
- SR 21; primary in red, secondary in blue

Route information
- Maintained by TDOT
- Length: 39.88 mi (64.18 km)
- Existed: October 1, 1923–present

Major junctions
- West end: Mississippi River near Tiptonville
- SR 22 / SR 78 at Tiptonville; US 51 at Troy; US 45W in Union City; US 51 / SR 22 in Union City; SR 690 / Future I-69 in Union City
- East end: KY 116 / KY 239 north of Union City at the Kentucky state line

Location
- Country: United States
- State: Tennessee
- Counties: Obion, Lake

Highway system
- Tennessee State Routes; Interstate; US; State
← SR 20	→ SR 22

State Route 21 (SR 21) is a two lane highway that runs from the Mississippi River west of Tiptonville, Tennessee to the Kentucky state line north of Union City. This road provides access to Reelfoot Lake State Park.

== Route description ==
SR 21 begins as a secondary highway in rural Obion County at the Kentucky state line, at the intersection of KY 116 and KY 239. It then travels south to first a diamond interchange with SR 690 (Future I-69) and then an intersection with US 51/SR 3/SR 22 just north of Union City. It then enters Union City on North Clover Street, then turns west on East Cheatam Street, then south again on North Division Street to intersect SR 5 (East Main Street) in Downtown. It then travels concurrently with SR 5 (now along South 1st Street) to intersect US 45W/SR 184/SR 431 in southern Union City. It then travels south along US 45W/SR 5, leaving Union City and intersecting SR 216 along the way. It then separates from US 45W/S 5 near Rives, and turns west. In Troy, It intersects with US 51/SR 3 again, running concurrently for a short ways before separating and turning west again into downtown Troy. Once in town, it then intersects with SR 184 (old US 51) in the heart of Troy. It then leaves Troy, still going west, and enters Hornbeak and has an intersection with SR 183. It continues west to just south of Samburg, to intersect and run concurrently with SR 22, where it becomes a primary highway. SR 21/SR 22 then run along the shores of Reelfoot Lake and cross the Hill-Talley Bridge over the Obion River and enter Lake County.

The highway passes by Reelfoot Lake State Park before turning west again to enter Tiptonville and they soon come to an intersection with SR 78, where SR 22 separates and follows SR 78 north while SR 21 downgrades to secondary here. It then continues into downtown to come to an intersection between Church Street and Cedar Street, where SR 22 previously separated and turned north along Cedar Street, while SR 21 continues west on Church Street to the banks of the Mississippi River, where SR 21 ends and the road continues as Tiptonville Ferry Road along the Tennessee-Obion Levee.

== Major intersections ==
County	Location	mi	km	Destinations	Notes
Obion		0.0	0.0	KY 116 (State Line Road) / KY 239 (State Highway 239) – Hickman, Cayce, Fulton	Kentucky state line; eastern terminus; road continues north as KY 239; SR 21 begins as a secondary highway
Obion	Union City	2.4	3.9	SR 690 / Future I-69	Diamond interchange; opened to traffic in February 2024
Obion	Union City			US 51 / SR 22 (SR 3/Jere B. Ford Memorial Highway) – Troy, South Fulton	
Obion	Union City			SR 5 north (E Main Street) – Woodland Mills	Eastern end of SR 5 concurrency
Obion	Union City			US 45W / SR 431 (SR 184/Reelfoot Avenue) – Troy, South Fulton	Eastern end of US 45W concurrency
Obion				SR 216 east (Pleasant Hill Road) – Rives, Martin	Western terminus of SR 216
Obion				US 45W south (SR 5 south) – Kenton	Western end of US 45W/SR 5 concurrency
Obion	Troy			US 51 north (SR 3 north/Jere B. Ford Memorial Highway) – Union City	Eastern end of US 51/SR 3 concurrency; Future I-69
Obion	Troy			US 51 south (SR 3 south/Jere B. Ford Memorial Highway) – Obion, Dyersburg	Western end of US 51/SR 3 concurrency; Future I-69
Obion	Troy			SR 184 north (Main Street) – Union City	Southern terminus of SR 184; former US 51
Obion	Hornbeak			SR 183 south (S Main Street) – Obion	Northern (western) terminus of SR 183
Obion				SR 22 south (W Highway 22) – Samburg	Eastern end of SR 22 concurrency; SR 21 becomes a primary highway
Obion River				Hill-Talley Bridge over the Obion River	
Lake	Tiptonville			SR 78 / SR 22 north (Carl Perkins Parkway/Kentucky Street) – Ridgely, Hickman, KY, Kentucky Bend	Western end of SR 22 concurrency; SR 21 downgrades to a secondary highway
Mississippi River		39.88	64.18	Mississippi River at Tiptonville-Obion Levee; western terminus; continues as Tiptonville Ferry Road; SR 21 ends as a secondary highway	
1.000 mi = 1.609 km; 1.000 km = 0.621 mi: Concurrency terminus
