= U.S. Route 51 in Tennessee =

Section of U.S. Highway in Tennessee, United States

U.S. Route 51
- State Route 3
- U.S. Route 51 in Tennessee, highlighted in red

Route information
- Maintained by TDOT
- Length: 135.90 mi (218.71 km)

Major junctions
- South end: US 51 at the Mississippi state line in Memphis
- I-55 in Memphis; US 78 in Memphis; US 64 / US 70 / US 72 / US 79 in Memphis; I-240 in Memphis; I-40 in Memphis; Future I-69 / SR 300 in Memphis; I-269 / SR 385 in Millington; I-155 / US 412 in Dyersburg; Future I-169 / US 45W / SR 22 near Union City; US 45 / US 45E in South Fulton
- North end: I-69 / US 51 at the Kentucky state line in South Fulton

Location
- Country: United States
- State: Tennessee
- Counties: Shelby, Tipton, Lauderdale, Dyer, Obion

Highway system
- United States Numbered Highway System; List; Special; Divided; Tennessee State Routes; Interstate; US; State
← SR 2	SR 3	→ SR 4
← SR 50	US 51	→ SR 51

U.S. Route 51 (US 51), mostly overlapped by the unsigned State Route 3 (SR 3), is a north–south state highway in the U.S. state of Tennessee, that is 135.9 miles (218.71 km) long and completely within West Tennessee. It begins in Shelby County and ends in Obion County. The SR 3 designation is seen largely on mileposts.

The two places where US 51 and SR 3 diverge are in Memphis, where US 51 has been moved to Danny Thomas Boulevard (State Route 1 / State Route 4), while SR 3 remains on the one-way pair of 2nd and 3rd Streets, and in South Fulton, where US 51 crosses the state line on State Route 215 to I-69, while SR 3 remains on the old road, now U.S. Route 45.

== Route description ==
US 51 enters Tennessee at Memphis and runs north through the cities of Millington, Munford, Atoka, Brighton, Covington, Henning, Ripley, Halls, Dyersburg, Troy, Union City, and South Fulton.

Routings of US 51 and SR 3 in Memphis

This highway crosses four interstate highways on its journey through the state and actually crosses Interstate 240 twice within the City of Memphis but interchanges with it only at Union Avenue. US 51 is the westernmost south–north United States Highway in the State of Tennessee. US 51 is an interstate standard facility from Dyersburg to South of Troy and then resuming interstate standard status north of Union City to South Fulton. US 51 is a four-lane or larger facility throughout the state with some sections north of Dyersburg carrying a 70 mph (110 km/h) speed limit.

Near Henning is also the site of the Hatchie River Bridge collapse on April 1, 1989 that killed eight motorists when three spans of the structure collapsed. The 54-year-old bridge was 45 miles (72 km) north of Memphis and carried the northbound lanes of US 51. Its collapse was the result of pier scour and movement of the river channel.

US 51 carries the Tennessee Scenic Parkway designation from its junction with SR 385 in Millington to SR 104 in Dyersburg and also carries the Great River Road designation from US 64/US 70/US 79 in Memphis to SR 88 in Halls.

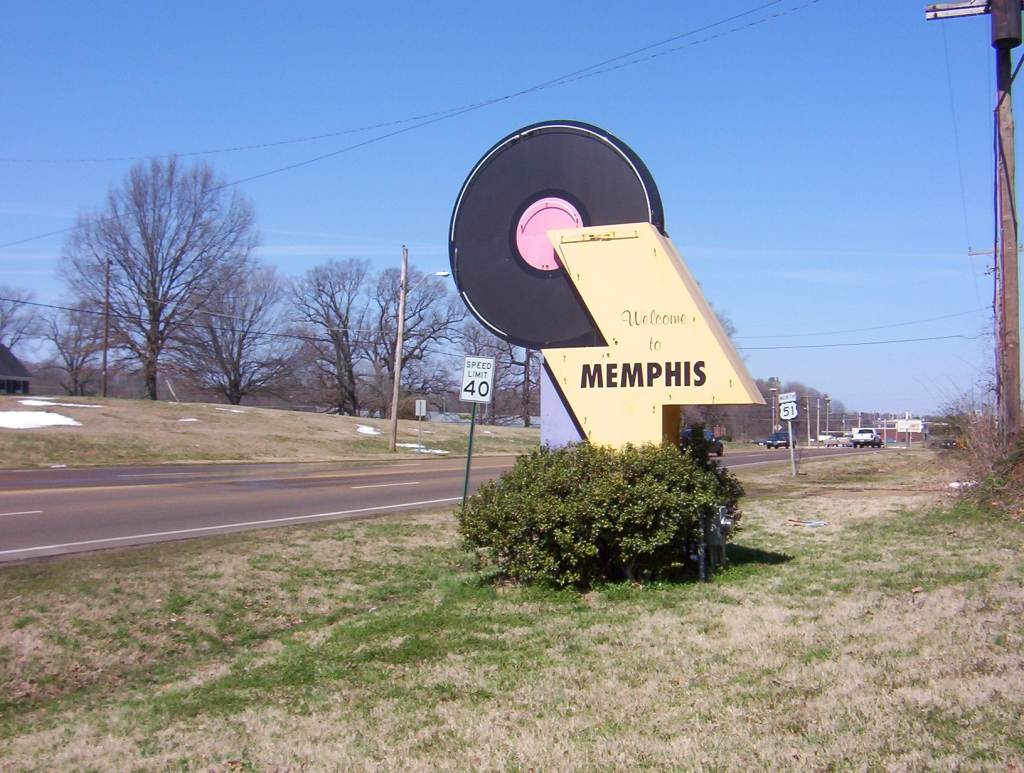
"Welcome to Memphis" sign on US 51 (2008)

== History ==
Historic two-lane alignments of this highway from Henning north are represented by State Route 209, a portion of State Route 88, State Route 210, State Route 211, a portion of State Route 183 and State Route 184. From Memphis to Henning, most of the original two lane road was widened to a four lane expressway in the 1960s.

== Future ==
Most of US 51 north of Dyersburg is expected to be converted to Interstate standards as part of future I-69. Plans currently call for I-69 to run along the existing US 51 freeway from Dyersburg to Troy and from Union City to South Fulton. This section is part of SIU 7 for I-69 and will require few changes beyond resigning the existing highway, however, a bypass route around Troy and Union City will need to be built before this section of future I-69 is completed. The Union City Bypass was opened in February 2024 under the temporary designation of SR 690, but there is currently no timeline for when the Troy bypass will be built.

== Major intersections ==
County	Location	mi	km	Destinations	Notes
Shelby	Memphis	0.0	0.0	US 51 south – Southaven	Continuation into Mississippi; southern terminus of SR 3; southern end of unsigned SR 3 concurrency
Shelby	Memphis	1.8	2.9	SR 175 (Shelby Drive)	
Shelby	Memphis	4.6– 4.8	7.4– 7.7	I-55 to I-240	I-55 exit 5; no access from US 51 south to I-55 north or I-55 south to US 51 north; connections provided via E Brooks Road
Shelby	Memphis	4.9	7.9	Bridge over Nonconnah Creek	
Shelby	Memphis	9.3	15.0	US 78 (Lamar Avenue/SR 4)	
Shelby	Memphis	9.9	15.9	US 64 east / US 70 east / US 72 east / US 79 north (Union Avenue/SR 23 east)	Southern end of US 64/US 70/US 79 overlap; western terminus of unsigned SR 23
Shelby	Memphis	10.2	16.4	I-240 south – Jackson Miss	No direct access to north(west)bound I-240 nor from south(east)bound I-240 (both signed at Madison Avenue); I-240 exit 30
Shelby	Memphis	11.3	18.2	US 64 west / US 70 west / US 79 south (Union Avenue/SR 3 north) / Danny Thomas Boulevard south (SR 1 west / SR 4 east)	Northern end of US 64/US 70/US 79/SR 3 overlap; southern end of SR 1/SR 4 overlap; interchange
Shelby	Memphis	11.5	18.5	Madison Avenue	Interchange
Shelby	Memphis	11.6	18.7	Jefferson Avenue	Interchange
Shelby	Memphis	12.1– 12.3	19.5– 19.8	I-40 – Little Rock, Nashville	I-40 exits 1B–D
Shelby	Memphis	12.5	20.1	SR 1 east (North Parkway) / SR 14 south (A.W. Willis Avenue)	Northern end of SR 1 overlap; southern end of SR 14 overlap
Shelby	Memphis	12.6	20.3	SR 14 north (Jackson Avenue)	Northern end of SR 14 overlap
Shelby	Memphis	13.1	21.1	Chelsea Avenue (SR 3 south)	Eastern terminus of SR 4; southern end of SR 3 overlap; no left turn from either direction
Shelby	Memphis	14.8– 15.0	23.8– 24.1	Bridge over the Wolf River	
Shelby	Memphis	15.4– 15.7	24.8– 25.3	I-40 (via SR 300) – Airport	I-40 exit 2A; future I-69
Shelby	Memphis	16.2	26.1	Great River Road south (Whitney Avenue) – General DeWitt Spain Airport	
Shelby	Memphis	18.4	29.6	SR 388 north / Great River Road north (North Watkins Street) – Meeman-Shelby State Park	Southern terminus of SR 388
Shelby	Memphis	20.3– 20.4	32.7– 32.8	Bridge over the Loosahatchie River	
Shelby	Millington	26.7– 26.9	43.0– 43.3	SR 385 south (Paul W. Barret Parkway) to I-40 – Arlington	Northern terminus of SR 385; future I-269
Shelby	Millington	27.7	44.6	SR 205 south (Navy Road) – University of Memphis Millington Center, Millington Municipal Airport, NSA Mid-South	Northern terminus of SR 205
Tipton	Atoka–Munford line	35.3	56.8	SR 178 north (Tipton Road) – Munford	Southern terminus of SR 178
Tipton	Atoka–Munford line	37.7	60.7	SR 206 (Munford Avenue/Munford-Atoka Road) – Munford, Atoka, Drummonds	
Tipton	Brighton	40.8	65.7	Old Highway 51 – Brighton Business District	
Tipton	Brighton	42.7	68.7	Old Highway 51 – Brighton Business District	
Tipton	Covington	47.2	76.0	SR 59 east (Mueller Brass Road) – Mason, Braden	Southern end of SR 59 overlap; truck route to SR 54 east
Tipton	Covington	49.2	79.2	SR 54 east (W Pleasant Street) – Brownsville	Western terminus of SR 54; one-way pair between W Pleasant Street and W Liberty Street
Tipton	Covington	49.3	79.3	SR 59 west / Great River Road south (W Liberty Avenue) – Duvall Landing	Northern end of SR 59 overlap
Tipton	Covington	50.4	81.1	SR 384 south (Industrial Road) – Downtown Covington	Northern terminus of SR 384; truck route to SR 54 east
Tipton–Lauderdale county line		54.7– 54.9	88.0– 88.4	Mark Anthony Walker Bridge over the Hatchie River	
Lauderdale		56.4– 56.5	90.8– 90.9	SR 209 north (S Main Street) – Henning, Alex Haley Museum	Southern terminus of SR 209
Lauderdale	Henning	58.0	93.3	SR 87 (Graves Avenue) / Great River Road north – Fort Pillow, Henning, Fort Pillow State Historic Park, Alex Haley Museum and Interpretive Center	
Lauderdale	Ripley	61.9	99.6	SR 19 east – Ripley Business District, Brownsville	Southern end of SR 19 overlap
Lauderdale	Ripley	63.7	102.5	SR 19 west / Great River Road south (Lake Drive) – Ripley	North end of SR 19 overlap; interchange
Lauderdale	Ripley	64.5	103.8	SR 208 south (Cleveland Street) – Ripley	Northern terminus of SR 208
Lauderdale		72.0	115.9	SR 180 south (Gates Road) – Gates	Northern terminus of SR 180
Lauderdale	Halls	75.0– 75.3	120.7– 121.2	SR 88 / Great River Road north – Halls, Mississippi River	Interchange
Dyer	Fowlkes	79.9	128.6	Bridge over the South Fork of the Forked Deer River	
Dyer	Fowlkes	82.1	132.1	To SR 210 – Fowlkes, Halls	
Dyer	Dyersburg	83.9	135.0	Airport Road - Dyersburg Regional Airport	
Dyer	Dyersburg	84.2	135.5	US 51 Bus. north (S Main Avenue/SR 211) to US 412 east – Downtown Dyersburg	Interchange; southern terminus of US 51 Business and unsigned SR 211; truck route to SR 104 east
Dyer	Dyersburg	85.5	137.6	Bridge over the North Fork of the Forked Deer River	
Dyer	Dyersburg	86.5	139.2	SR 104 (Forrest Street) – Finley, Trenton, Downtown Dyersburg	
Dyer	Dyersburg	88.5	142.4	SR 78 (Lake Road) to I-155 / US 412 – Tiptonville, Reelfoot Lake State Park, Dyersburg State Community College, Downtown Dyersburg	
Dyer	Dyersburg	90.2	145.2	US 51 Bus. south (Saint John Avenue/SR 211 south) – Dyersburg	South end of unsigned SR 211 overlap; northern terminus of US 51 Business
Dyer	Dyersburg	91.7	147.6	US 412 east (SR 20 east) / SR 211 north (Saint John Avenue) to I-40 – Jackson, Newbern	Northern end of unsigned SR 211 overlap; southern end of US 412 overlap; south end of freeway; western terminus of unsigned SR 20; interchange
Dyer	Dyersburg	92.1	148.2	I-155 west / US 412 west – St. Louis	North end of US 412 overlap; eastern terminus of I-155; I-155 exit 15
Dyer	Newbern	97.0– 97.7	156.1– 157.2	SR 77 east – Newbern	Western terminus of SR 77
Dyer–Obion county line		104.2– 104.8	167.7– 168.7	SR 105 east (County Line Street) – Trimble, Rutherford	Western terminus of SR 105
Obion	Obion	106.8– 106.9	171.9– 172.0	Bridge over the Obion River	
Obion	Obion	108.2– 108.7	174.1– 174.9	SR 183 (Palestine Avenue) – Obion	
Obion		113.6	182.8	SR 183 north (Davis Highway) – Obion	Northern end of freeway; at-grade intersection; southern terminus of SR 183
Obion	Troy	113.9	183.3	S Main Street - Troy	Former US 51
Obion	Troy	114.8	184.8	SR 21 west (W Harper Street) – Troy, Hornbeak, Tiptonville, Reelfoot Lake State Park	Southern end of SR 21 overlap
Obion	Troy	115.3	185.6	SR 21 east (Rives Road) – Rives	Northern end of SR 21 overlap
Obion	Troy	120.0– 120.4	193.1– 193.8	SR 690 north / Future I-69	A4 partial cloverleaf interchange; opened to traffic in February 2024
Obion	Union City	122.0	196.3	SR 184 south (Old Troy Road)	Southern end of unsigned SR 184 concurrency; Former US 51
Obion	Union City	122.2	196.7	SR 431 south (W Reelfoot Avenue/SR 184 north) to US 45W – Martin, Airport	Northern terminus of SR 431; northern end unsigned SR 184 concurrency
Obion	Union City	123.0	197.9	SR 22 north / SR 5 (W Main Street) – Woodland Mills, Samburg, Reelfoot Lake, Reelfoot National Wildlife Refuge, Business District	Southern end of SR 22 overlap
Obion	Union City	125.6	202.1	SR 21 (N Clover Street) – Clinton, KY, Union City	
Obion		127.1– 127.7	204.5– 205.5	US 45W south / SR 22 south (Section Line Road) – Union City, Martin	Northern end of SR 22 overlap; southern end of US 45W overlap; southern end of freeway; interchange; future I-169
Obion		130.0	209.2	SR 690 south / Future I-69 south	Semi-directional T interchange; opened to traffic in February 2024; future southern end of I-69 overlap
Obion	South Fulton	134.5	216.5	SR 214 west (Ken Tenn Highway)	Interchange; eastern terminus of SR 214; southbound exit and northbound entrance; northern end of freeway
Obion	South Fulton	134.8	216.9	US 45 north (Chickasaw Drive/SR 3 north) / US 45E south (SR 215 east) – South Fulton, Martin	Northern end of US 45W and unsigned SR 3 overlap; southern end of unsigned SR 215 overlap; US 45W and US 45E merge to form US 45; southern end of freeway; interchange
Obion	South Fulton	135.9	218.7	I-69 north / US 51 north – Fulton	Continuation into Kentucky; southern terminus of I-69; western terminus of unsigned SR 215
1.000 mi = 1.609 km; 1.000 km = 0.621 mi: Concurrency terminus; Incomplete access; Route transition

== Dyersburg business route ==
U.S. Route 51 Business
- Location: Dyersburg
- Length: 3.9 mi (6.3 km)

U.S. Route 51 Business (US 51 Bus.) is a 3.9-mile-long (6.3 km) business route of US 51 located entirely in the city of Dyersburg in Dyer County. It has the unsigned designation of State Route 211 (SR 211) for its entire length.

The highway begins as South Main Avenue at a large three-way intersection with US 51/SR 3 on the southern edge of the city. It heads north, concurrent with SR 211, as a two-lane road through a business district before traveling through wooded areas and crossing a bridge over the North Fork of the Forked Deer River into downtown. US 51 Bus./SR 211 pass by the Dyer County Courthouse and becomes concurrent with SR 104 (East Court Street) as the road becomes North Main Avenue shortly before making an abrupt left turn onto McGaughey Street. US 51 Bus./SR 211 then split before heading through neighborhoods along Troy Avenue before turning right onto Gordon Street. The highway then makes a left turn onto North Sampson Avenue and passes through more neighborhoods before merging onto St. John Avenue. They then travel through a business district before widening to a four-lane highway and coming to an end at an intersection with US 51/SR 3, where US 51 Bus. ends and SR 211 follows northbound US 51/SR 3 north on St. John Avenue.

The entire route is in Dyersburg, Dyer County.

mi	km	Destinations	Notes
0.0	0.0	US 51 (51-Bypass South / SR 3) – Halls, Union City	Southern end of unsigned SR 211 concurrency; southern terminus of US 51 Bus. and SR 211
1.7	2.7	Bridge over the North Fork of the Forked Deer River	
1.9	3.1	SR 104 east (East Court Street) – Trenton	Southern end of SR 104 concurrency
2.1	3.4	SR 104 west (McGaughey Street) – Finley	Northern end of SR 104 concurrency
3.9	6.3	US 51 (US 51 Bypass / Saint John Avenue / SR 3 / SR 211 north) to I-155 – Halls, Union City	Northern end of unsigned SR 211 concurrency; northern terminus
1.000 mi = 1.609 km; 1.000 km = 0.621 mi: Concurrency terminus

== See also ==
- List of highways numbered 51

U.S. Route 51
Previous state: Mississippi	Tennessee	Next state: Kentucky
