= Tennessee State Route 184 =

State highway in Tennessee, United States

State Route 184
- Old Troy Road

Route information
- Maintained by TDOT
- Length: 12.92 mi (20.79 km)
- Existed: July 1, 1983–present

Major junctions
- South end: SR 21 at Troy
- SR 690 / Future I-69 at Union City; US 51 at Union City; SR 431 at Union City; US 45W at Union City; SR 22 near Union City
- North end: SR 214 near Union City

Location
- Country: United States
- State: Tennessee
- Counties: Obion

Highway system
- Tennessee State Routes; Interstate; US; State
← SR 183	→ SR 185

State Route 184 (abbreviated SR 184) is a 12.92-mile-long (20.79 km) highway in West Tennessee, running between the cities of Troy and Union City.

== Route description ==
SR 184 begins at Troy as a rural two-lane secondary highway at an intersection with SR 21 and continues parallel to the US 51/SR 3 expressway for its first 8.5 miles (13.7 km). Entering Union City, SR 184 has a diamond interchange with the SR 690 (Future I-69) freeway. Within Union City, SR 184 is a 5-lane undivided highway and follows E. Reelfoot Avenue for approximately 1.75 miles (2.82 km) as a hidden concurrency with US 45W. SR 184 turns northerly at Miles Street for 0.86 miles (1.38 km) and then turns northwesterly along Nailing Drive before terminating at the SR 22 freeway. At this point, SR 184 changes to SR 214, which continues north along the Kenn-Tenn Highway. SR 184 is unsigned from its junction with US 51 to its northern terminus at SR 22.

== History ==
SR 184 from Troy to Union City represents the old two-lane alignment of US 51 and SR 3.

== Major intersections ==
The entire route is in Obion County.

Location	mi	km	Destinations	Notes
Troy	0.0	0.0	SR 21 (Harper Street) – Tiptonville, Hornbeak, Rives	Southern terminus; SR 184 begins as a signed highway
Union City	8.2	13.2	SR 690 / Future I-69	Diamond interchange; opened to traffic in February 2024
Union City	8.9	14.3	US 51 south (SR 3/W Reelfoot Avenue) – Troy, Dyersburg	Southern end of unsigned US 51/SR 3 overlap; SR 184 becomes unsigned
Union City	9.1	14.6	US 51 north (Everett Boulevard/SR 3) / SR 431 south – South Fulton	Northern end of unsigned US 51/SR 3 overlap; northern terminus of SR 431; southern end of wrong-way unsigned SR 431 concurrency
Union City	9.7	15.6	US 45W south / SR 21 (SR 5/S 1st Street) – downtown, Rives, Kenton	Southern end of unsigned US 45W overlap
Union City	10.6	17.1	SR 431 south (E Reelfoot Avenue) – Martin	Northern end of unsigned SR 431 overlap
Union City	12.9	20.8	US 45W north / SR 22 (Future I-169) to US 51 – South Fulton, Martin SR 214 north (Ken Tenn Highway)	Interchange; northern end of unsigned US 45W/SR 22 overlap; northern terminus; southern terminus of SR 214; SR 184 ends as an unsigned highway
1.000 mi = 1.609 km; 1.000 km = 0.621 mi: Concurrency terminus
