= Tennessee State Route 183 =

State highway in Tennessee, United States

State Route 183
- Glass Road, Elbridge–Obion Road, Old SR 3
- SR 183 highlighted in red

Route information
- Maintained by TDOT
- Length: 14.17 mi (22.80 km)
- Existed: July 1, 1983–present

Major junctions
- North (West) end: SR 21 at Hornbeak
- US 51 near Obion
- South (East) end: US 51 at Troy

Location
- Country: United States
- State: Tennessee
- Counties: Obion

Highway system
- Tennessee State Routes; Interstate; US; State
← SR 182	→ SR 184

State Route 183 (SR 183) is a 14.17-mile-long (22.80 km) secondary state highway traveling in a generally west–east direction, even though it is signed north–south, in West Tennessee.

== Route description ==
SR 183 begins at Hornbeak at an intersection with SR 21 and travels southerly as "Glass Road" through rolling hills and sharp curves until coming to a three-way stop at "Elbridge–Obion Road". SR 183 turns east at this stop and continues on with a 55 mph (89 km/h) speed limit traveling through the community of Glass and crossing US 51/SR 3 before coming to a four-way stop at Obion. At this intersection, SR 183 turns north and continues on until ending at the previously mentioned US 51/SR 3 expressway.

== History ==
SR 183, from mile marker 9.37 (four-way stop at Obion) to mile marker 14.17, is a former portion of SR 211 and is also the historical alignment of US 51/SR 3. This portion of SR 211 was decommissioned due to the derelict Adkison Memorial Bridge directly south of Obion. The Obion County map link in the reference section is out of date and still shows this section of highway as being bannered SR 211 although signs in the field have been changed entirely over to SR 183 shields. The new 2007 Official Transportation Map issued by TDOT shows the recent change of this section of roadway from SR 211 to SR 183.

== Major intersections ==
The entire route is in Obion County.

Location	mi	km	Destinations	Notes
Hornbeak	0.0	0.0	SR 21 (Main Street) – Tiptonville, Troy	Northern (Western) terminus
	8.0	12.9	US 51 (Jere B Ford Memorial Highway/SR 3) – Dyersburg, Union City	Interchange; future I-69
Troy	14.2	22.9	US 51 (Jere B Ford Memorial Highway/SR 3) – Dyersburg, Union City	Southern (Eastern) terminus
1.000 mi = 1.609 km; 1.000 km = 0.621 mi
