= Kentucky Route 239 =

State highway in Kentucky, United States

Kentucky Route 239
- KY 239 highlighted in red

Route information
- Maintained by KYTC
- Length: 10.3 mi (16.6 km)

Major junctions
- South end: KY 116 and SR 21 at the Tennessee state line east of Jordan
- KY 166 north of Jordan; KY 94 east of Cayce
- North end: KY 123 southwest of Clinton

Location
- Country: United States
- State: Kentucky
- Counties: Fulton, Hickman

Highway system
- Kentucky State Highway System; Interstate; US; State; Parkways
← KY 238	→ KY 240

Kentucky Route 239 (KY 239) is a 10.3-mile-long (16.6 km) state highway in the U.S. state of Kentucky. The highway connects mostly rural areas of Fulton and Hickman counties with the Tennessee state line.

== Route description ==
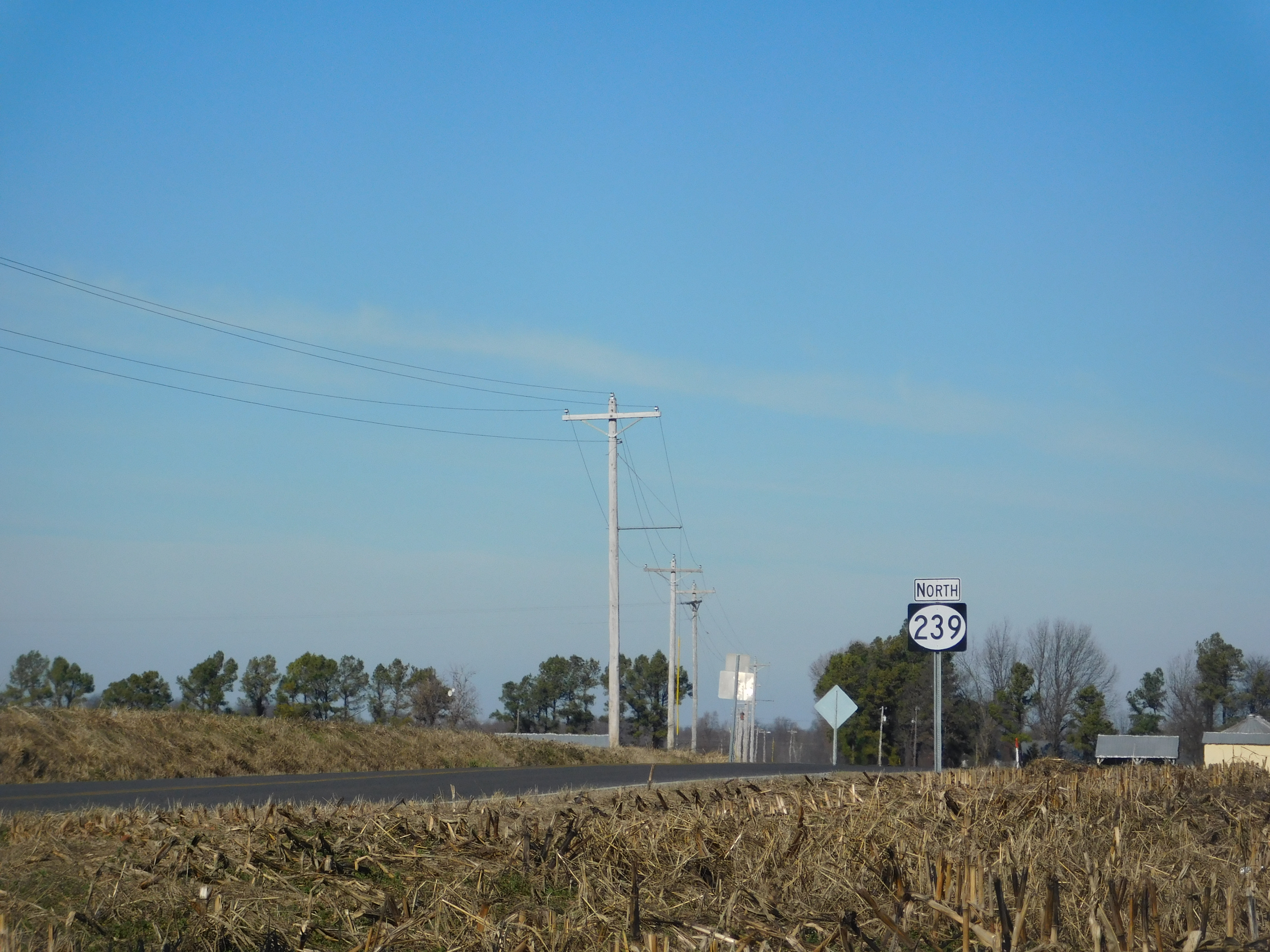
KY 239 running north of KY 116

KY 239 begins at the Tennessee state line just east of Jordan, within Fulton County, where the roadway continues as Tennessee State Route 21. On the state line, it has an intersection with KY 116 (East State Line Road). It travels to the north-northeast and immediately curves to the north-northwest. It curves to the north and intersects KY 166. The highway curves to the north-northeast and intersects the eastern terminus of KY 1128. It curves to the north and enters Cayce, where it intersects KY 94. It curves to the north-northeast and intersects the northern terminus of KY 1129. When the highway crosses over Little Bayou de Chien, it enters Hickman County.

KY 239 continues to the north-northeast. Just southeast of Moscow, the highway intersects the western terminus of KY 1529 before it crosses over Bayou de Chien. KY 239 curves back to the north and crosses over Hurricane Branch before meeting its northern terminus, an intersection with KY 123. Here, the roadway continues as Bakers Road.

== History ==
KY 239 was originally designated to run from US 42 east of Warsaw south to KY 16 in Glencoe; this became part of US 127 when it was extended into Kentucky by 1962, and KY 239 was reassigned as a renumbering of Kentucky Route 127 (KY 127) to avoid duplication.

== Major intersections ==
County	Location	mi	km	Destinations	Notes
Fulton		0.0	0.0	SR 21 west – Union City	Continuation beyond Tennessee state line
Fulton		0.0	0.0	KY 116 (East State Line Road)	
Fulton		1.0	1.6	KY 166	
Fulton		2.6	4.2	KY 1128 west	Eastern terminus of KY 1128
Fulton	Cayce	3.6	5.8	KY 94 / Great River Road south – Hickman, Fulton	Southern end of Great River Road concurrency
Fulton		6.2	10.0	KY 1129 south	Northern terminus of KY 1129
Hickman		7.0	11.3	KY 1529 east	Western terminus of KY 1529
Hickman		10.3	16.6	KY 123 / Great River Road north	Northern end of Great River Road concurrency
1.000 mi = 1.609 km; 1.000 km = 0.621 mi: Concurrency terminus
