= Protemus, Tennessee =

- Unincorporated community
- Location within Tennessee Location within the United States
- Coordinates: 36°24′10″N 89°14′09″W
- Country: United States
- State: Tennessee
- County: Obion
- Elevation: 341 ft (104 m)
- Time zone: UTC-6 (Central (CST))
  - Summer (DST): UTC-5 (CDT)
- Area code: 731
- GNIS feature ID: 1311841

Protemus is an unincorporated community in Obion County, Tennessee, United States. Protemus is located along the intersection of the local Shawtown Road and Troy-Protemus Road, 5.98 miles (9.62 km) east-southeast of Troy.
