= Interstate 69 in Tennessee =

Proposed highway in Tennessee

Future Interstate 69
- Unsigned I-69 Segments built to interstate standards Future or proposed segments

Route information
- Maintained by TDOT
- Status: Concurrency with I-55/I-240/I-40/SR 300 approved but unsigned; remainder of route in various stages of construction, design and land acquisition

Major junctions
- South end: I-55 / I-69 at Mississippi state line
- I-55 / I-240 in Memphis; I-40 in Memphis; I-269 in Millington; I-155 / US 412 northwest of Dyersburg; I-169 northeast of Union City
- North end: I-69 / US 51 at Kentucky state line

Location
- Country: United States
- State: Tennessee
- Counties: Shelby, Tipton, Lauderdale, Dyer, Obion

Highway system
- Interstate Highway System; Main; Auxiliary; Suffixed; Business; Future; Tennessee State Routes; Interstate; US; State
← SR 68	→ SR 69
← US 641	SR 690	→ I-840

Interstate 69 (I-69) is a proposed Interstate Highway that will pass through the western part of the US state of Tennessee, serving the cities of Union City, Dyersburg, and Memphis. Currently, a 21-mile (34 km) section of already-existing freeway in Memphis has been approved for the I-69 designation (although it has not been signed as such) while another segment near Union City opened on February 21, 2024, under the temporary designation of Tennessee State Route 690. However, state officials have stated that they will not commit to finishing the interstate in their state until they receive more federal funding.

== Route description ==
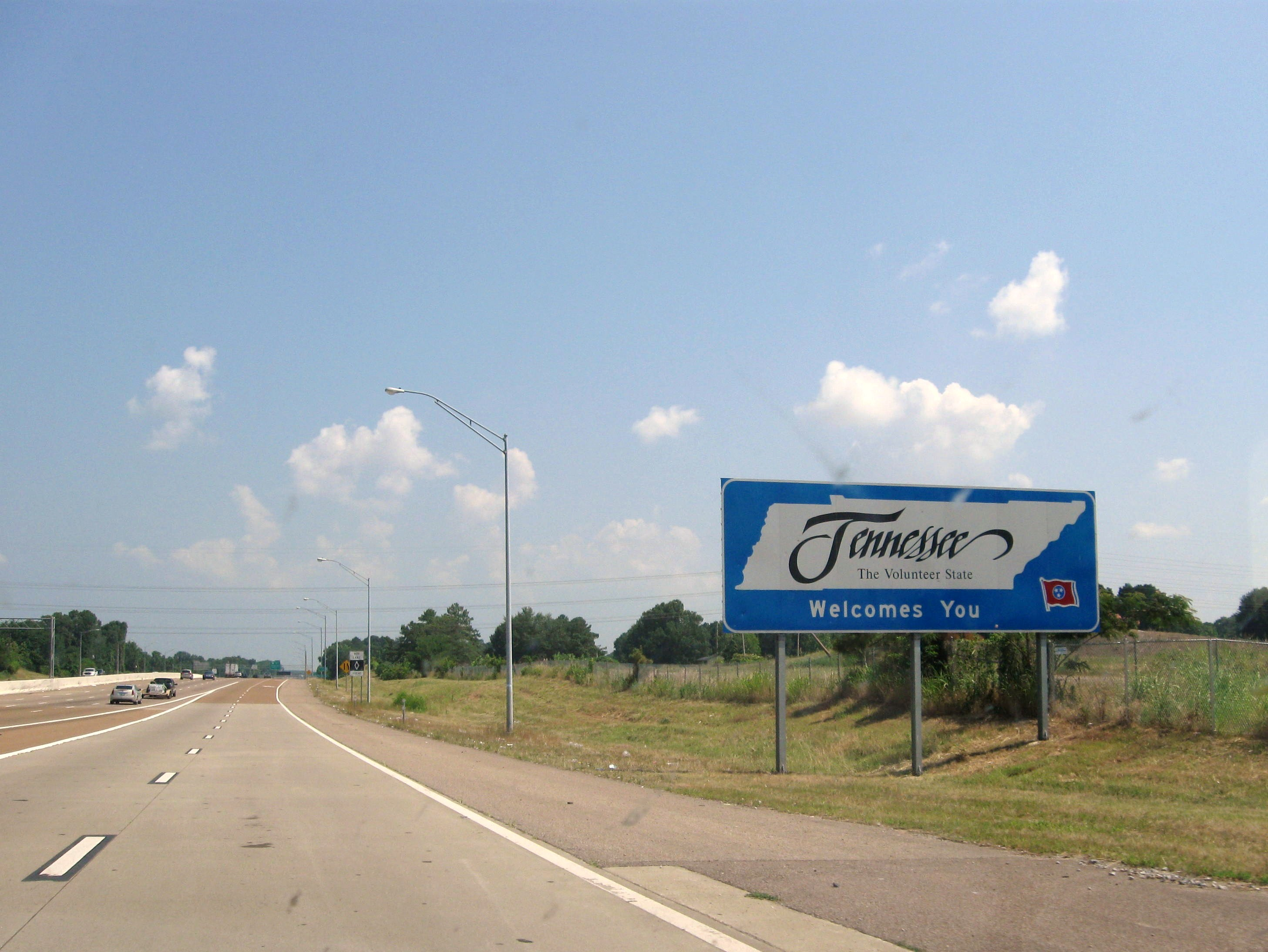
I-69 northbound, along with I-55, as it enters Tennessee in Memphis

From Fulton, Kentucky, I-69 is planned to continue to the southwest, replacing and bypassing existing U.S. Route 51, serving Union City, Dyersburg (where it will intersect I-155), Ripley, Covington, Millington, and Memphis. It will pass near Discovery Park in Union City.

On January 18, 2008, the Federal Highway Administration (FHWA) authorized the states of Mississippi and Tennessee to extend I-69 from the I-40/State Route 300 (SR 300) interchange in north Memphis to the I-55/I-69 interchange in Hernando, Mississippi; Tennessee has not yet signed the extension of the route, although Mississippi has.

== Planned extension ==
I-69 in Tennessee has been divided into three segments of independent utility (SIUs).

Tennessee considered legislation that would allow I-69 to be built as a toll road, thereby accelerating its design and construction timetable by several years should such legislation be approved. Tennessee's toll road legislation came as Congress withdrew $171 million (equivalent to $248 million in 2024) allocated for Tennessee highway projects, including funds for I-69, in 2007. This federal highway allotment was diverted to fund military operations in Iraq under U.S. Troop Readiness, Veterans' Care, Katrina Recovery, and Iraq Accountability Appropriations Act, 2007.

=== SIU 7 ===
This SIU begins at the Kentucky–Tennessee border in Fulton and closely follows US 51 to Dyersburg. The 20-mile (32 km) stretch between Dyersburg and Troy is at Interstate Highway standards—opening with the completion of I-155 west of Dyersburg. An additional 10-mile (16 km) stretch north of Union City to within 1,100 feet (340 m) of the Kentucky border is also a freeway. Thus, the vast majority of the work on SIU 7 will involve bypassing the 15-mile (24 km) portion of US 51 between Troy and Union City (where it is currently a four-lane surface arterial with at-grade intersections) and redesigning the US 51/US 45 interchange in South Fulton. The redesign is projected to start construction in 2028. This stretch has been divided into five smaller sections. The first two sections make up the Troy Bypass, while the northern three sections represent the Union City Bypass. Tennessee State Route 690 will be the temporary designation for the Union City bypass until I-69 is completed between the Purchase Parkway and I-155.

The first construction contract was set for SIU 7 on October 30, 2009, covering Section 4 (middle leg of the Union City Bypass). The winning bid for constructing the 4.3-mile (6.9 km) section between SR 21 and SR 5 northwest of Union City was awarded to Ford Construction Company of Dyersburg for $33 million (equivalent to $46.8 million in 2024). Construction on this section of the Union City Bypass began in the spring of 2010 and was completed in the summer of 2012. However, it remained closed to traffic until adjacent sections were completed. As of July 2014, land acquisition and utility relocations were underway in all five sections from Troy to Union City. The Tennessee Department of Transportation (TDOT) awarded a construction contract for 2.4-mile (3.9 km) Section 3 (southern leg of the Union City Bypass) in March 2016 and planned to let a second contract for Section 5 (northern leg of the Union City Bypass) in December 2016. Work began on Section 3 in June 2016.

There is no current timetable for letting contracts to construct the Troy Bypass (Sections 1 and 2). However, TDOT Commissioner John Schroer estimated in February 2013 that it would take around 10 years to gradually complete work on SIU 7 due to lack of funding.

This situation (and the next one below) regarding funding was solved on May 23, 2017, with the signing of the IMPROVE (Improving Manufacturing, Public Roads and Opportunities for a Vibrant Economy) Act. The legislation raised taxes and fees for drivers and others: $0.06 for regular fuel, $0.10 for diesel fuel, and $0.08 for liquefied and compressed natural gases (a total of $355 million). The state would get $250 million, counties $70 million, and cities $35 million. Most vehicle owners saw their registration fees go up by $5; private and commercial owners had their fees go up by $10, with ride-sharing exempt; and heavy truck operators would pay $20 more. Electric vehicle owners in Tennessee (about 2,500) would pay an additional $100 in registration and renewal fees (since they do not pay fuel taxes); hybrid-electric car owners are exempt from the extra charges. The new money would fund parts of I-69 in the state. The Union City sections (3, 4, and 5) of this segment begin construction in 2017. Paving on the three segments begin in July 2021 and the segment opened to traffic on February 21, 2024 as SR 690. TDOT has acquired the right-of-way and is finalizing design for the Troy portion (1 and 2), construction for bypass is slated for 2035 with improvement on existing US 51 from southern end of Troy Bypass to Dyersburg slated for 2033.

=== SIU 8 ===
SIU 8 proceeds south from Dyersburg, paralleling US 51 to a planned interchange with SR 385 (I-269) in Millington. To facilitate work on the draft environmental impact statement (EIS) for this segment, TDOT has divided SIU 8 into three smaller segments. In April 2006, TDOT has announced the preferred routing for the northern and southern subsections, favoring an alignment to the west of US 51. Meanwhile, studies are still ongoing for the central section, which include alignments both east and west of the existing US 51. Once TDOT identifies the preferred alignment for the central segment, it is expected that a supplemental draft EIS will be necessary before the final EIS can be prepared.

The routing of I-69 has been criticized by the state Sierra Club chapter for not making use of the existing right-of-way for US 51 via Tennessee Hatchie River Bridge and for potentially impacting the Hatchie River, a state-designated scenic river.

TDOT has suspended work indefinitely on segment 8 due to a lack of funding. TDOT has further stated that it does not intend to resume work on the Dyersburg–Millington section until Congress commits federal funding to complete environmental studies, right-of-way acquisition, and construction. However, the revived completion of segment 7 of I-69 in northwestern Tennessee connecting to I-155 and I-55 will provide an unbroken freeway route from that region to Memphis. It will bypass the uncompleted segment 8 by following the west side of the Mississippi River before crossing the river into Memphis and linking to partly finished segment 9. TDOT officials determined "there would be value" in finishing just enough of I-69 to link it to I-55, a major north–south route that runs through Memphis.

=== SIU 9 ===
South of Millington, I-69 will intersect the I-269 Memphis Outer Beltway, then continue southwest, roughly parallel to US 51, then abruptly turn east near General DeWitt Spain Airport to connect with I-40 at the existing SR 300 interchange in the Frayser neighborhood. I-69 follows I-40 for about three miles (4.8 km) to the I-40/I-240 Midtown Interchange, where I-69 continues south along the Midtown portion of I-240 (mileposts 25–31) to the I-240/I-55 interchange in Whitehaven. From that interchange, I-69 continues south, merged with I-55 for approximately 12 miles (19 km), crossing the Mississippi state line. The Mississippi Department of Transportation (MDOT) has been working on widening I-55/I-69 between Hernando and the Tennessee state line, adding travel lanes in each direction, reconstructing bridges, and improving traffic flow at interchanges. Meanwhile, TDOT is reconstructing I-55 and I-240 from the Mississippi line to Memphis. With much of the route already built and at Interstate standards through Memphis, the FHWA authorized TDOT to sign I-69 over I-55, I-240, and I-40 on January 18, 2008; however, TDOT has not yet done so. However, it is still signed as an "I-69 FUTURE CORRIDOR".

Similar to segment 8, TDOT has suspended work indefinitely on the unbuilt section between SR 300 and the proposed interchange with I-269 near Millington due to a lack of funding. TDOT has further stated that it does not intend to resume work on this section until Congress commits federal funding to complete environmental studies, right-of-way acquisition and construction.

== Exit list ==
This exit lists includes exits from existing I-55, I-240, I-40, SR 300, I-155, and US 51. The I-69 designation has only been approved on the southern 15 miles (24 km). I-69 is not currently signed along this route.

County	Location	mi	km	Exit	Destinations	Notes
Tennessee–Mississippi line		0.00	0.00		I-55 south / I-69 south	Continuation into Mississippi
Shelby	Memphis	1.5	2.4	2	SR 175 (Shelby Drive) – Whitehaven, Capleville	Signed as exits 2A (east) and 2B (west) southbound; exit numbers follow I-55
Shelby	Memphis	4.4	7.1	5	US 51 (Elvis Presley Boulevard, SR 3) / Brooks Road – Graceland	Signed as exits 5A (Brooks Road) and 5B (US 51 south) southbound
Shelby	Memphis	5.5	8.9	6A 25B	I-55 north / I-240 east – Nashville, Little Rock, Memphis International Airport, St. Louis, Jackson, Miss	Northern end of I-55 concurrency; southern end of I-240 concurrency; signed as exits 6A northbound and 25B southbound
Shelby	Memphis	6.1	9.8	26	Norris Road	Exit numbers follow I-240
Shelby	Memphis	8.3	13.4	28	South Parkway	Signed as exits 28A (east) and 28B (west)
Shelby	Memphis	9.6	15.4	29	US 78 (Lamar Avenue / E.H. Crump Boulevard / SR 4)	
Shelby	Memphis	9.8	15.8	30	US 51 / US 64 / US 70 / US 79 (Union Avenue / SR 3)	Northbound exit and southbound entrance
Shelby	Memphis	10.5	16.9	30	Madison Avenue	Southbound exit and northbound entrance
Shelby	Memphis	10.9	17.5	31	I-40 west – Little Rock	Northbound exit and southbound entrance
Shelby	Memphis	10.9	17.5	32 1F	SR 14 (Jackson Avenue)	Signed as exits 32 northbound and 1F southbound
Shelby	Memphis	10.9	17.5	—	I-240 ends / I-40 west – Little Rock	Northern end of I-240 concurrency; southern end of I-40 concurrency; southbound left exit and northbound left entrance; I-40 exit 1E
Shelby	Memphis	12.5	20.1	2	Chelsea Avenue / Smith Avenue	Exit number follows I-40
Shelby	Memphis	13.8	22.2	2A	I-40 east – Nashville	Northern end of I-40 concurrency; southern end of unsigned SR 300 concurrency; southbound exit and northbound entrance each include direct ramps to/from Watkins Street
Shelby	Memphis	15.1	24.3	—	US 51 / SR 300 south – Millington	Northern end of unsigned SR 300 concurrency
Gap in route
Shelby	Millington			—	I-269 south – Arlington, Nashville	Future northern terminus of I-269
Shelby	Millington			—	US 51 – Millington	
Shelby	Millington			—	West Union Road	
Tipton				—	Simmons Road	
Tipton				—	SR 178 – Munford	
Tipton	Brighton			—	Akins Road	
Tipton				—	SR 59 – Covington	
Tipton				—	US 51 south – Covington	Southern end of US 51 concurrency
Hatchie River				Tennessee Hatchie River Bridge		
Lauderdale				—	US 51 north – Henning	Northern end of US 51 concurrency
Lauderdale				—	SR 87 – Henning	
Lauderdale	Ripley			—	SR 19 – Ripley, Brownsville	
Lauderdale	Ripley			—	US 51 – Ripley	
Lauderdale				—	SR 88 – Halls	
Dyer				—	Unionville Road	
Dyer				—	SR 104 – Dyersburg	
Dyer		0.0	0.0	—	I-155 west / US 412 west – St. Louis	Future eastern terminus of I-155, western end of US 412 concurrency
Dyer	Dyersburg	2.4	3.9	—	SR 78 – Dyersburg, Tiptonville	Currently I-155 exit 13
Dyer	Dyersburg	5.3	8.5	—	US 51 south / US 412 east – Dyersburg, Jackson	Currently I-155 exit 15; southern end of US 51 concurrency; eastern end of US 412 concurrency
Dyer	Newbern	9.1	14.6	—	SR 77 – Newbern	
Dyer–Obion county line		16.2	26.1	—	SR 105 – Trimble	
Obion	Obion	19.8	31.9	—	SR 183 – Obion	
Obion	Troy			—	US 51 – Troy	Proposed; northern end of US 51 concurrency
Obion	Troy			—	Troy Polk Station Road	Proposed
Obion	Troy			—	SR 21	Proposed
Obion				—	US 51 – Union City	Opened on February 21, 2024; currently designated SR 690; temporarily southern end of SR 690
Obion	Union City			—	SR 184 – Union City	Opened February 21, 2024; currently designated SR 690
Obion	Union City			—	SR 22 / SR 5 – Union City	Opened February 21, 2024; currently designated SR 690
Obion				—	Brevard Road	Opened February 21, 2024; currently designated SR 690
Obion				—	SR 21 – Union City	Opened February 21, 2024; currently designated SR 690
Obion				—	US 51 south / US 45W south – Union City	Opened February 21, 2024; northbound exit unopened as June 2024; currently designated SR 690; temporarily northern end of SR 690
Obion	South Fulton			—	SR 214 west (Ken Tenn Highway)	Eastern terminus of SR 214
Obion	South Fulton			—	US 45 north (Chickasaw Drive/SR 3 north) / US 45E south (SR 215 east) – South Fulton, Martin	
Obion	South Fulton			—	I-69 north / US 51 north – Fulton	Continuation into Kentucky; western terminus of unsigned SR 215
1.000 mi = 1.609 km; 1.000 km = 0.621 mi: Concurrency terminus; Incomplete access; Unopened

== Related routes ==
=== Interstate 269 ===
Interstate 269
- Location: Mississippi state line - Arlington
- Length: 17.95 mi (28.89 km)
- Existed: 2015–present

The second route, I-269, is a beltway around Memphis. I-269 is designated from the Mississippi state line to I-40 as of 2025.

The northern segment of SR 385 is expected to be redesignated as I-269 in the future, from I-40 to I-69.

=== State Route 690 ===
State Route 690
- Future Interstate 69
- Location: Bypass around Union City
- Existed: February 21, 2024–present

State Route 690 is the designation given to highways currently open that are not yet part of I-69, but will be in the future. The first of these opened on February 21, 2024 around Union City. Planning began on the bypass on October 30, 2009, and construction commenced in early 2010. The central portion of the bypass was completed in the middle of 2012 without mainline paving, however the segments connecting both ends to US 51 on both sides of Union City remained incomplete, until construction on those segments began in 2016, and was completed in early 2024.

Construction will commence on the interchange in 2028 on US 51/US 45E in South Fulton, Tennessee. The SR 690 designation is expected to be replaced by the I-69 designation in the future, connecting with the segment of Interstate 69 in Kentucky.

Exit list

The entire route is in Obion County.

Location	mi	km	Exit	Destinations	Notes
	0.00	0.00		Future I-69 south	Continuing south as Future I-69
	0.68	1.09	—	US 51 – Union City	Opened on February 21, 2024; currently designated SR 690; temporarily southern end of SR 690
Union City	1.50	2.41	—	SR 184 – Union City	Opened February 21, 2024; currently designated SR 690
Union City	2.50	4.02	—	SR 22 / SR 5 – Union City	Opened February 21, 2024; currently designated SR 690
	4.00	6.44	—	Brevard Road	Opened February 21, 2024; currently designated SR 690
	6.90	11.10	—	SR 21 – Union City	Opened February 21, 2024; currently designated SR 690
	10.30	16.58	—	US 51 south / US 45W south – Union City	Opened February 21, 2024; Currently designated SR 690; temporarily north end of SR 690
South Fulton	15.50	24.94	—	SR 214 west (Ken Tenn Highway)	Current eastern terminus of SR 214; northbound exit unopened as June 2024; currently open as part of US 51
South Fulton	15.80	25.43	—	US 45 north (Chickasaw Drive/SR 3 north) / US 45E south (SR 215 east) – South Fulton, Martin	Future diamond interchange
South Fulton	16.10	25.91	—	I-69 north / US 51 north – Fulton	Future northern terminus of SR 690; continuation into Kentucky
1.000 mi = 1.609 km; 1.000 km = 0.621 mi: Concurrency terminus; Incomplete access; Unopened

== Notes ==
Interstate 69
Previous state: Mississippi	Tennessee	Next state: Kentucky
