= Tennessee State Route 214 =

State highway in Tennessee, United States

State Route 214
- Ken Tenn Highway
- SR 214 highlighted in red

Route information
- Maintained by TDOT
- Length: 9.7 mi (15.6 km)
- Existed: July 1, 1983–present

Major junctions
- West end: Future I-169 / US 45W / SR 22 near Union City
- East end: Future I-69 / US 45W / US 51 in South Fulton

Location
- Country: United States
- State: Tennessee
- Counties: Obion

Highway system
- Tennessee State Routes; Interstate; US; State
← SR 213	→ SR 215

State Route 214 (SR 214) is a 9.7-mile-long (15.6 km) two-lane east-to-west state highway located in Obion County in the U.S. state of Tennessee. Locally, this road is known as the Ken Tenn Highway.

== Route description ==
SR 214 begins at an intersection with US 45W, SR 22, and SR 184 in Union City. The SR 22 freeway goes north and south. US 45W comes in from the west and goes north with SR 22. SR 214 continues east from here traveling south of the US 51/US 45W/SR 3 freeway alignment as a two-lane highway through farmland. The old alignment (SR 214) merges with the new alignment on the west side of South Fulton, just west of an interchange with US 45E/SR 215.

== History ==
SR 214 is the former alignment of U.S. Route 51 (US 51) between Union City and South Fulton before the existing freeway alignment was constructed slightly to the north.

== Major intersections ==
The entire route is in Obion County.

Location	mi	km	Destinations	Notes
Union City	0.0	0.0	US 45W south (Nailling Drive/SR 184 south) – Union City US 45W north / SR 22 to US 51 – Martin	Western terminus of SR 214; northern terminus of unsigned SR 184; interchange; Future I-169
South Fulton	9.7	15.6	US 51 north / US 45W north (SR 3 north) – South Fulton	Interchange; eastern terminus; southbound exit and northbound entrance; Future I-69
1.000 mi = 1.609 km; 1.000 km = 0.621 mi: Incomplete access
