= Cunningham, Tennessee =

Cunningham is the name of places in the U.S. state of Tennessee:

- Cunningham, Montgomery County, Tennessee
- Cunningham, Obion County, Tennessee
