= Cayce, Kentucky =

Census-designated place in Kentucky, United States

- Census-designated place
- Location within Fulton County and the state of Kentucky
- Coordinates: 36°33′19″N 89°2′9″W
- Country: United States
- State: Kentucky
- County: Fulton

Area
  - Total: 1.64 sq mi (4.24 km^{2})
  - Land: 1.63 sq mi (4.22 km^{2})
  - Water: 0.0039 sq mi (0.01 km^{2})
- Elevation: 400 ft (120 m)

Population (2020)
  - Total: 119
  - Density: 73.0/sq mi (28.18/km^{2})
- Time zone: UTC-6 (Central (CST))
  - Summer (DST): UTC-5 (CDT)
- ZIP code: 42041
- Area codes: 270 & 364
- FIPS code: 21-13600
- GNIS feature ID: 0489154

Cayce /ˈkeɪsiː/ is an unincorporated community and census-designated place (CDP) in Fulton County, Kentucky, United States, in the state's southwestern corner. As of the 2020 census it had a population of 119.

The community was named for James Hardie Cayce, who established stores in Moscow, Clinton, and Cayce. Cayce is centrally located in Kentucky's westernmost county, Fulton. The name is a homophone of "Casey".

Cayce includes the area east and west from Willingham Bottom and Bayou de Chien Creek to Mud Creek and north and south from Moscow to the Middle Road (Kentucky Route 166). Part of the town, known as the "junction", is at the junction of Kentucky Routes 94 and 239. This is the location of the service stations and cafe. Also at that junction (on the northwest corner) is an old elementary school (now closed), with a monument out front identifying Cayce as the hometown of American cultural icon, railroad engineer Casey Jones (1863–1900), who grew up in the area.

== History ==
Jones began work in 1878 for the north-south Mobile and Ohio Railroad (later the Gulf, Mobile and Ohio, and since the early 1970s a part of the Illinois Central Gulf Railroad); by 1890 he had worked his way up to engineer on the Illinois Central Railroad. John Luther "Casey" Jones earned his place in American folklore and legend for remaining at the throttle in the 1900 crash in which he lost his life.

In that era, railroaders with common surnames were often referred to by their hometown. John Luther Jones's nickname thus became "Cayce" Jones ("Casey" would later become the accepted spelling).

In the late 19th century and early 20th century Cayce was a thriving southern business town. Today, however it is a residential small town.

=== December 2021 tornado ===
In December 2021, during a major tornado outbreak, Cayce was hit by the Western Kentucky tornado. Dozens of structures—including approximately 2/3 of all homes in the town—sustained major damage, and several were completely destroyed by damage rated up to EF4. These included the town's fire department and the former Cayce High School. After claiming a life, the tornado continued traveling east through multiple counties and cities in Western Kentucky, causing widespread devastation and killing 58 people.

In the months following the storm, residents struggled with trauma from the outbreak and the slow rebuilding process, with many continuing to live in trailers or converted containers.

Historical population
Census	Pop.	Note	%±
2020	119		—
U.S. Decennial Census

== Bibliography ==
- (1928). "Life and Times of Casey Jones." The Washington Post. January 12.
