= Shearon =

Shearon is a surname. Notable people with the surname include:

- John Shearon (1871–1932), American baseball player
- Sam Shearon (born 1978), English artist
- Thomas Rogers Shearon (1825–1887), American politician

== See also ==
- Sharon
