= Tennessee State Route 300 =

State highway in Tennessee, United States

State Route 300
- "The 101 Connector"

Route information
- Maintained by TDOT
- Length: 1.46 mi (2.35 km)

Major junctions
- West end: US 51 in Memphis
- East end: I-40 in Memphis

Location
- Country: United States
- State: Tennessee
- Counties: Shelby

Highway system
- Tennessee State Routes; Interstate; US; State
← SR 299	→ SR 301

State Route 300 (abbreviated SR 300) is a four-lane freeway in Memphis, Tennessee that runs from Interstate 40 to U.S. Highway 51. SR 300 is unsigned throughout its length except on mileposts. The exit signs on I-40 just refer to SR 300 as Exit 2A going to US 51 and Millington. SR 300 carries a 55 mph (89 km/h) speed limit. Local media sometimes refers to this short route as the "101 Connector", its former federal aid urban designation (U-101 connector). The I-69 designation has been approved for the entire length of SR 300.

The route that is now SR 300 was originally envisioned as a freeway known as the Mud Island Expressway, which would have extended from the present-day eastern terminus across Mud Island to I-40 near downtown.

== History ==
SR 300 was originally part of an abortive effort in the 1960s to build an expressway connecting the northern portion of the then Interstate 240 to Mud Island. Ghost ramps and abandoned grading for this expressway still exist at the current western terminus of SR 300 at U.S. Highway 51 and also at I-40 Exit 1 in downtown Memphis.

== Future ==
SR 300 is slated to be signed as part of the proposed Interstate 69 (I-69). In November 2004, the Tennessee Department of Transportation announced alternative A-1 (SIU 9) as the preferred alignment of future I-69 through the Memphis area which will include SR 300.

== Exit list ==
The entire route is in Memphis, Shelby County.

mi	km	Destinations	Notes
0.00	0.00	US 51	Western terminus
1.46	2.35	I-40 / Watkins Street	Eastern terminus; exit 2A on I-40
1.000 mi = 1.609 km; 1.000 km = 0.621 mi
