= Dixie, Tennessee =

- Unincorporated community
- Location within Tennessee Location within the United States
- Coordinates: 36°25′43″N 89°12′21″W
- Country: United States
- State: Tennessee
- County: Obion
- Elevation: 486 ft (148 m)
- Time zone: UTC-6 (Central (CST))
  - Summer (DST): UTC-5 (CDT)
- Area code: 731
- GNIS feature ID: 1314260

Dixie is an unincorporated community in Obion County, Tennessee, United States. Dixie is located along local Shawtown Road, 8.29 miles (13.34 km) west of Union City.

The community was once home to Dixie High School, which is now a GNIS historical landmark.
