= Union City micropolitan area, Tennessee =

Union City Area Union City, TN Micropolitan Statistical Area
- Micropolitan Statistical Area
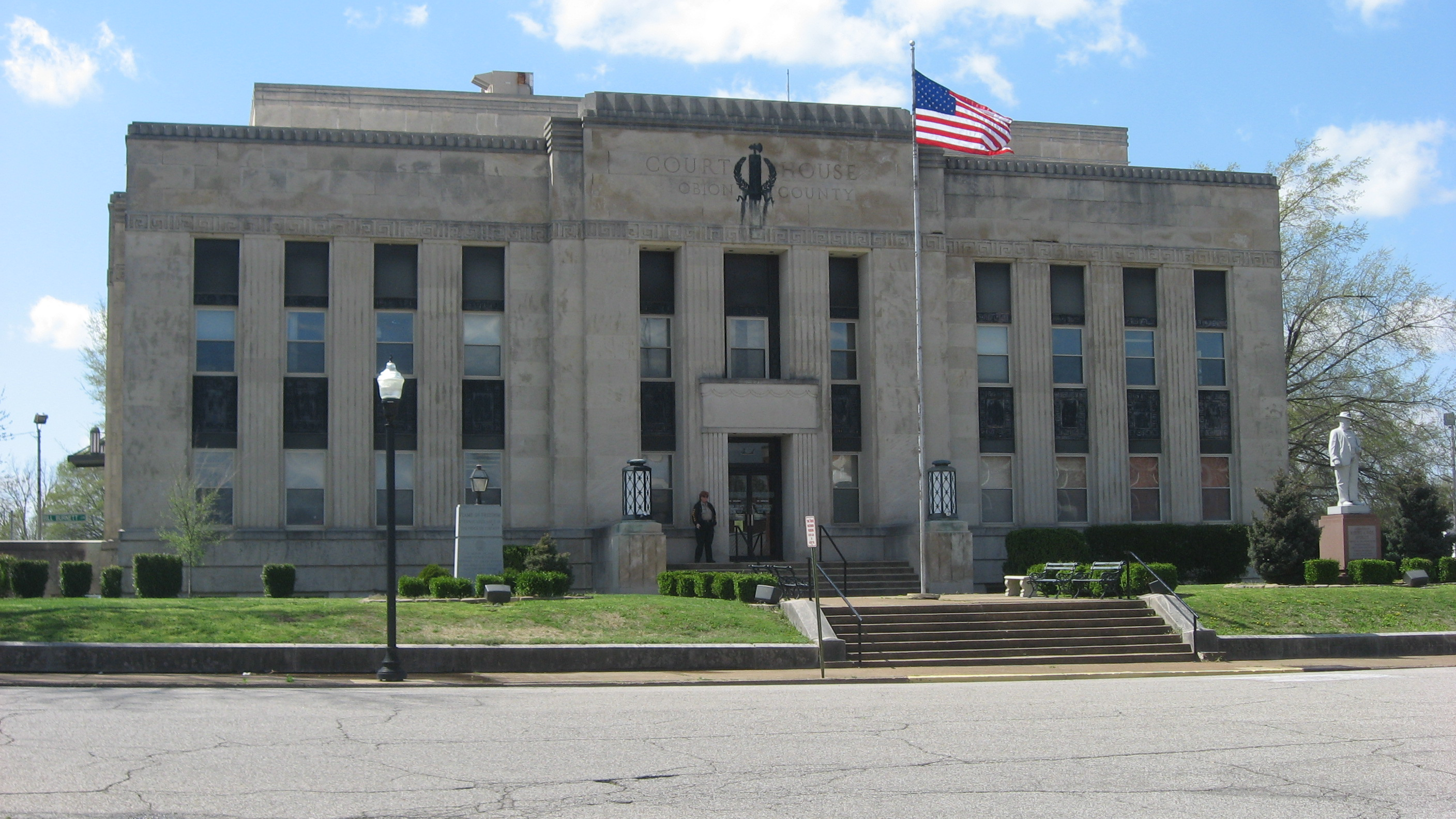
- Obion County Courthouse
Map of Martin–Union City, TN CSA
Martin, TN µSA
City of Martin
Union City, TN µSA
Union City
- Country: United States
- State: Tennessee
- Principal cities: Martin; Union City
- Time zone: UTC−6 (CST)
  - Summer (DST): UTC−5 (CDT)

The Union City micropolitan statistical area, as defined by the United States Census Bureau, is an area consisting of Obion County, Tennessee, anchored by the city of Union City, Tennessee. As of the 2000 census, the μSA had a population of 32,450.

== Demographics ==
As of the 2000 census, there were 40,202 people, 16,419 households, and 11,511 families residing within the μSA. The racial makeup of the μSA was 85.64% White, 12.42% African American, 0.13% Native American, 0.21% Asian, 0.04% Pacific Islander, 0.80% from other races, and 0.76% from two or more races. Hispanic or Latino of any race were 1.67% of the population.

The median income for a household in the μSA was $28,573, and the median income for a family was $35,661. Males had a median income of $29,682 versus $19,791 for females. The per capita income for the μSA was $15,859.

== Combined statistical area ==
The Martin–Union City combined statistical area is made up of two counties in northwest Tennessee. The statistical area includes two micropolitan areas. As of the 2010 census, the CSA had a population of 65,541.

=== Counties ===
- Obion County, Tennessee
- Weakley County, Tennessee

=== Communities ===
==== Places with 10,000 to 15,000 inhabitants ====
- Martin, Tennessee (principal city)
- Union City, Tennessee (principal city)

==== Places with 1,000 to 10,000 inhabitants ====
- Dresden, Tennessee
- Gleason, Tennessee
- Greenfield, Tennessee
- Kenton, Tennessee (partial)
- McKenzie, Tennessee (partial)
- Obion, Tennessee
- South Fulton, Tennessee
- Troy, Tennessee

==== Places with less than 1,000 inhabitants ====
- Hornbeak, Tennessee
- Rives, Tennessee
- Samburg, Tennessee
- Sharon, Tennessee
- Trimble, Tennessee (partial)
- Woodland Mills, Tennessee

=== Micropolitan statistical areas (μSAs) ===
- Union City (Obion County, Tennessee)
- Martin (Weakley County, Tennessee)

== See also ==
- Tennessee statistical areas
