= Thomas Rogers Shearon =

American politician (1825–1887)

Thomas Rogers Shearon (April 4, 1825 – August 19, 1887) was an American attorney and politician. He served in the Tennessee Senate as a Democrat.

== Early life ==
Shearon was born in Tuscumbia, Alabama on April 4, 1825. Part of his childhood was spent in Harpeth Shoals, Williamson County, Tennessee. His father was Thomas W. Shearon.

He entered Yale College in 1846 and graduated in 1849. He became a farmer in Davidson County, Tennessee after college. In April 1852, Shearon moved to Dyer County, Tennessee. In the fall of 1853, he enrolled at Harvard Law School, receiving an LL.B degree in July 1855.

== Career ==
After graduating from law school, Shearon practiced law and taught in Dyer County, Tennessee, for two years. In April 1857, he moved to Troy, Tennessee, where he practiced law until he died.

Shearon served during the American Civil War as a major and colonel of the 47th Confederate Tennessee Regiment. In April 1863, he became the provost marshal at Holly Springs, Mississippi, through the end of the war.

Shearon was the first railroad commissioner of Tennessee. In 1874, Shearon made an unsuccessful run for the Tennessee Senate. He was elected to the Tennessee Senate in October 1878 representing Obion County for one term. He was a Democrat.

== Personal life ==
Shearon married Mary J. Lowe in September 1849. The couple had nine children.

In 1885, his health declined and he became an invalid. Shearon died in Troy, Tennessee, on August 19, 1887, at the age of 63.
