= Mark Anthony Walker Bridge =

Bridge in Tennessee

Coordinates: 35.6373°N 89.6096°W

- Carries: Future I-69 / US 51
- Crosses: Hatchie River

The Mark Anthony Walker Bridge, also known as the Tennessee Hatchie River Bridge, is two bridge spans that carry U.S. Route 51 (US 51) over the Hatchie River located north of Covington, Tennessee (approximately 45 miles (72 km) north of Memphis, Tennessee). In 1989, the northbound span collapsed after flooding caused riverbed erosion near the structure.

It is planned to carry Interstate 69 in the future.

== History ==
The 4,201-foot (1,280-metre) long concrete bridge was constructed in 1936. In the 1970s, it began to only carry the northbound lanes when new separate southbound bridge and lanes were built.

=== 1989 collapse ===
On April 1, 1989, the span carrying northbound US 51 collapsed during floodings due to riverbed erosion causing a structure failure. The timber piles used to support the bridge were buried and were not intended to be exposed to water. Eight people died in the collapse. The bridge was inspected in September 1987 and was due for another in September 1989. Inspections first noted issues with the piles becoming exposed in 1979, but no corrective work was done. The simple design of the bridge, being over 50 years old at the time, was also cited as a factor in the collapse.

A proclamation from the mayor of Lauderdale County, Tennessee, honoring the victims of the collapse was issued 30 years later in 2019.

== See also ==
- List of bridge failures
