= Rags Faircloth =

American baseball player (1892-1953)

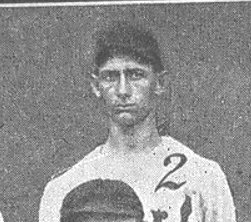
- Pitcher
- Born: August 19, 1892; Kenton, Tennessee, U.S.
- Died: October 5, 1953 (aged 61); Tucson, Arizona, U.S.
- Batted: Unknown Threw: Unknown

MLB debut
- May 6, 1919, for the Philadelphia Phillies

Last MLB appearance
- May 15, 1919, for the Philadelphia Phillies

MLB statistics
- Games played: 2
- Win–loss record: 0–0
- Earned run average: 9.00
- Strikeouts: 0
- Stats at Baseball Reference

Teams
- Philadelphia Phillies (1919)

James Lamar "Rags" Faircloth (August 19, 1892 – October 5, 1953) was an American Major League Baseball pitcher. Faircloth played for the Philadelphia Phillies in 1919. In two career games, he had a 0–0 record with a 9.00 ERA. He batted and threw right-handed.

Faircloth was born in Kenton, Tennessee, and died in Tucson, Arizona.
