= Kenton, Tennessee =

Town in the United States

- Town
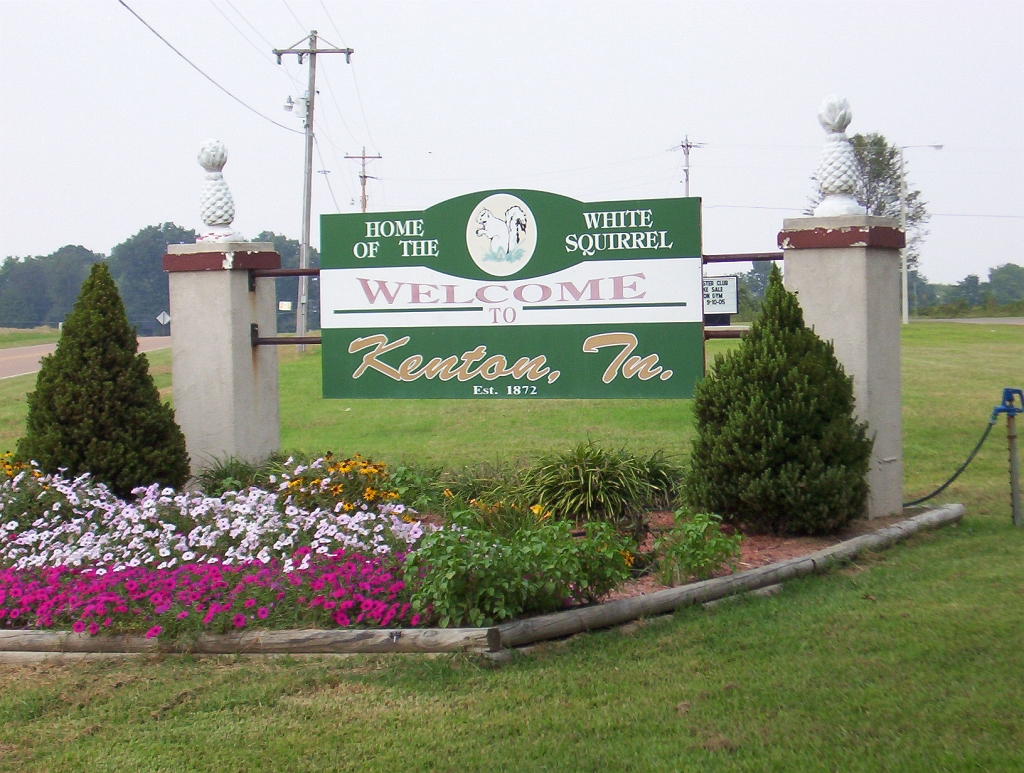
- Kenton, Tennessee, Home of the White Squirrel

- Location of Kenton in Gibson County, Tennessee.
- Coordinates: 36°12′7″N 89°0′47″W
- Country: United States
- State: Tennessee
- Counties: Gibson, Obion

Government
  - Mayor: Danny Jowers

Area
  - Total: 2.53 sq mi (6.56 km^{2})
  - Land: 2.52 sq mi (6.53 km^{2})
  - Water: 0.015 sq mi (0.04 km^{2})
- Elevation: 308 ft (94 m)

Population (2020)
  - Total: 1,205
  - Density: 478.2/sq mi (184.63/km^{2})
- Time zone: UTC-6 (Central (CST))
  - Summer (DST): UTC-5 (CDT)
- ZIP code: 38233
- Area code: 731
- FIPS code: 47-39140
- GNIS feature ID: 1290092
- Website: https://www.cityofkentontn.com/

Kenton is a town in Gibson and Obion counties, Tennessee. As of the 2020 census, Kenton had a population of 1,205. The Gibson County portion of Kenton is part of the Humboldt, TN Micropolitan Statistical Area, while the Obion County portion is part of the Union City, TN–KY Micropolitan Statistical Area.

== Geography ==
Kenton is located at 36°12′7″N 89°0′47″W (36.202027, -89.013044).

According to the United States Census Bureau, the town has a total area of 2.0 square miles (5.2 km^{2}), of which 2.0 square miles (5.2 km^{2}) is land and 0.04 square miles (0.10 km^{2}) (1.00%) is water.

== Demographics ==
Historical population
Census	Pop.	Note	%±
1880	298		—
1890	395		32.6%
1910	815		—
1920	804		−1.3%
1930	810		0.7%
1940	809		−0.1%
1950	899		11.1%
1960	1,095		21.8%
1970	1,439		31.4%
1980	1,551		7.8%
1990	1,366		−11.9%
2000	1,306		−4.4%
2010	1,281		−1.9%
2020	1,205		−5.9%

=== 2020 census ===
Kenton racial composition
Race	Num.	Perc.
White (non-Hispanic)	955	79.25%
Black or African American (non-Hispanic)	156	12.95%
Native American	6	0.5%
Other/Mixed	62	5.15%
Hispanic or Latino	26	2.16%

As of the 2020 United States census, there were 1,205 people, 540 households, and 354 families residing in the town.

=== 2000 census ===
As of the census of 2000, there were 1,306 people, 567 households, and 378 families residing in the town. The population density was 653.6 inhabitants per square mile (252.4/km^{2}). There were 616 housing units at an average density of 308.3 units per square mile (119.0 units/km^{2}). The racial makeup of the town was 84.76% White, 14.40% African American, 0.08% Native American, 0.08% Pacific Islander, 0.23% from other races, and 0.46% from two or more races. Hispanic or Latino of any race were 1.91% of the population.

There were 567 households, out of which 30.9% had children under the age of 18 living with them, 49.9% were married couples living together, 12.5% had a female householder with no husband present, and 33.3% were non-families. 30.9% of all households were made up of individuals, and 18.2% had someone living alone who was 65 years of age or older. The average household size was 2.30 and the average family size was 2.85.

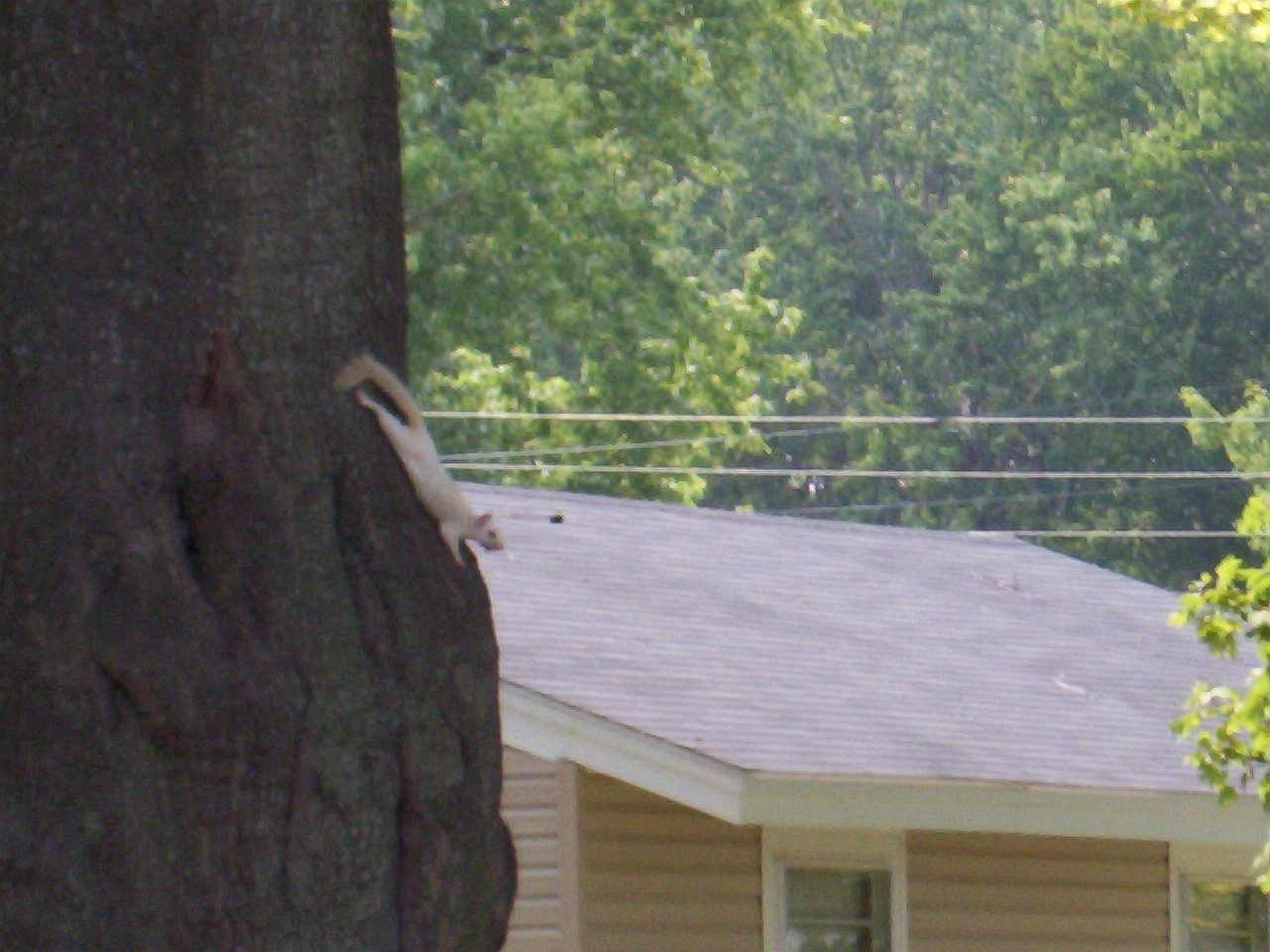
Albino squirrel in Kenton, Tennessee

In the town, the population was spread out, with 24.5% under the age of 18, 7.1% from 18 to 24, 27.8% from 25 to 44, 22.8% from 45 to 64, and 17.8% who were 65 years of age or older. The median age was 38 years. For every 100 females, there were 87.6 males. For every 100 females age 18 and over, there were 81.6 males.

The median income for a household in the town was $29,803, and the median income for a family was $37,788. Males had a median income of $27,037 versus $19,792 for females. The per capita income for the town was $16,515. About 11.9% of families and 14.6% of the population were below the poverty line, including 16.5% of those under age 18 and 19.7% of those age 65 or over.

== Fauna ==
Kenton is one of four communities in the United States that has a large population of white squirrels. In 2006 the population was estimated at 200, or about one for every six residents. The town celebrates this anomaly with its annual White Squirrel Festival held during the week in which the Fourth of July falls.

== Education ==
The portion in Gibson County is in the Gibson County School District. Gibson County High School is the zoned high school of this portion.

The portion in Obion County is in the Obion County Schools.

== Notable people ==
- Carl Bell, musician.
- Rags Faircloth, baseball player.
- Memphis Pal Moore, boxer.
- Bill Sanderson, politician – State Representative 2010–2019
