= Kentucky Route 166 =

State highway in Kentucky, United States

Kentucky Route 166
- KY 166 highlighted in red

Route information
- Maintained by KYTC
- Length: 13.279 mi (21.370 km)

Major junctions
- West end: KY 125 near Hickman
- KY 1648 in Fulton
- East end: US 45 / KY 1648 in Fulton

Location
- Country: United States
- State: Kentucky
- Counties: Fulton

Highway system
- Kentucky State Highway System; Interstate; US; State; Parkways
← KY 165	→ KY 167

Kentucky Route 166 (KY 166) is a 13.279-mile (21.370 km) state highway in Fulton County, Kentucky. It runs from Kentucky Route 125 southeast of Hickman to U.S. Route 45 and Kentucky Route 1648 in northwestern Fulton.

== Major intersections ==
The entire route is in Fulton County.

Location	mi	km	Destinations	Notes
	0.000	0.000	KY 125	Western terminus
	0.398	0.641	KY 2140	
	1.015	1.633	KY 116 east	Western terminus of KY 116
	3.039	4.891	KY 1127	
	5.106	8.217	KY 239	
	6.645	10.694	KY 781	
	8.978	14.449	KY 1125 north	Southern terminus of KY 1125
	10.198	16.412	KY 1706 north	Southern terminus of KY 1706
	11.230	18.073	KY 1909 north / Hardy Road	Southern terminus of KY 1909
Fulton	12.735	20.495	KY 2567 (Holiday Lane)	
Fulton	12.800	20.600	KY 2568 (Eastwood Drive)	
Fulton	13.070	21.034	KY 1644 south (Red Bud Lane)	Northern terminus of KY 1644
Fulton	13.219	21.274	KY 1648 east (Nolan Avenue) / Earl Street	West end of KY 1648 overlap
Fulton	13.279	21.370	US 45 (Highland Drive) / KY 1648 west (Stephen Beale Drive)	Eastern terminus; east end of KY 1648 overlap; continues as KY 1648 beyond US 45
1.000 mi = 1.609 km; 1.000 km = 0.621 mi: Concurrency terminus
