= Samburg, Tennessee =

- Town
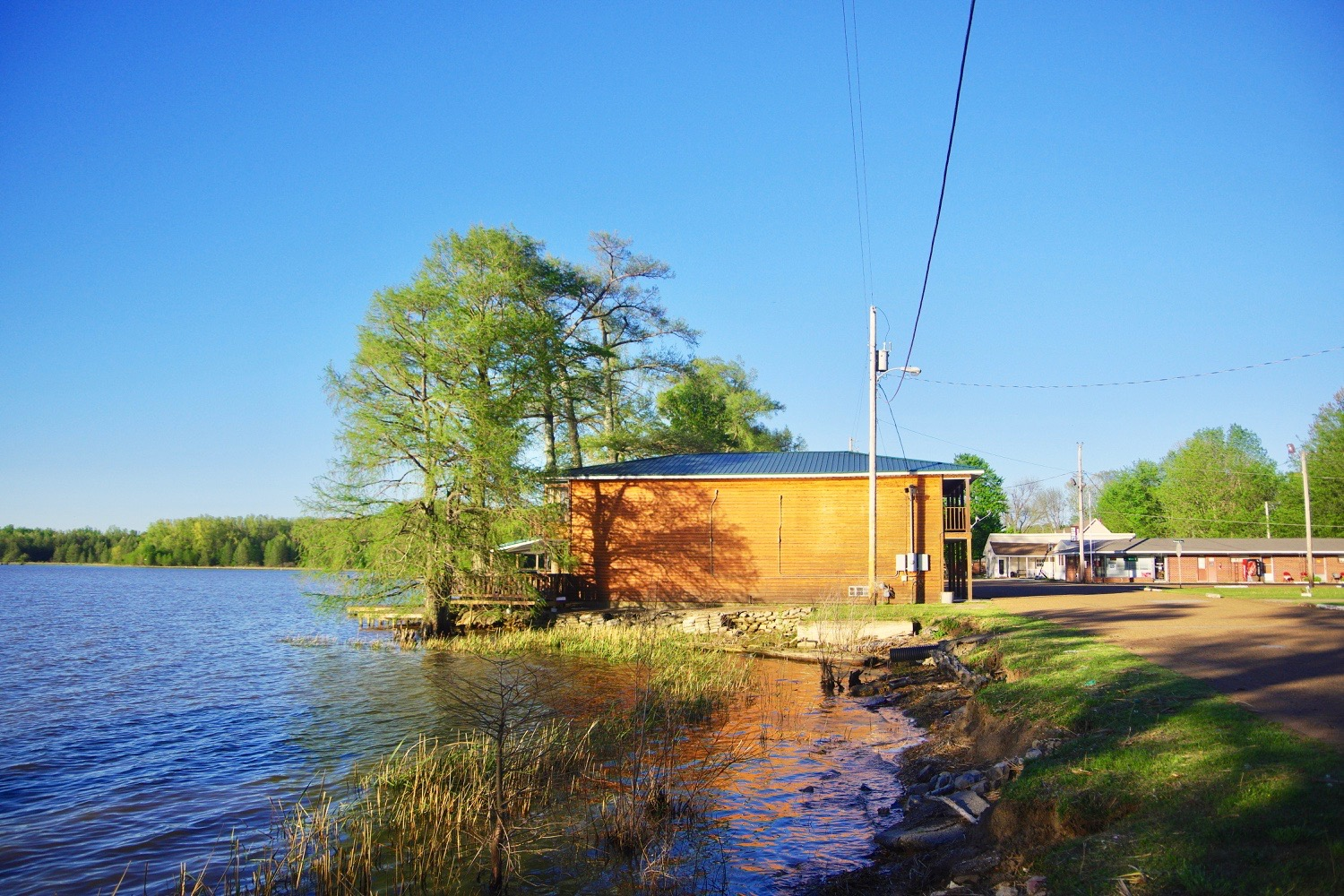
- Buildings along Lakeview Drive, with Reelfoot Lake on the left

- Location of Samburg in Obion County, Tennessee.
- Coordinates: 36°22′48″N 89°21′8″W
- Country: United States
- State: Tennessee
- County: Obion
- Incorporated as a town: 11 July 1953

Government
  - Mayor: John Glessner

Area
  - Total: 0.69 sq mi (1.80 km^{2})
  - Land: 0.47 sq mi (1.23 km^{2})
  - Water: 0.22 sq mi (0.58 km^{2})
- Elevation: 285 ft (87 m)

Population (2020)
  - Total: 210
  - Density: 443.6/sq mi (171.29/km^{2})
- Time zone: UTC-6 (Central (CST))
  - Summer (DST): UTC-5 (CDT)
- ZIP code: 38254
- Area code: 731
- FIPS code: 47-66360
- GNIS feature ID: 1300630

Samburg is a town in Obion County, Tennessee, United States. The population was 210 at the 2020 census. Samburg is located on the eastern shores of Reelfoot Lake.

== History ==
The town was initially known as "Wheeling" before changing its name to "Samburg" in honour of a local merchant.

Samburg was officially incorporated on July 11, 1953.

On the night of December 10 and morning of December 11, 2021, a devastating EF4 tornado destroyed much of the town.

== Geography ==
Samburg is located at 36°22′48″N 89°21′8″W (36.379990, -89.352253).

According to the United States Census Bureau, the town has a total area of 0.8 square miles (2.1 km^{2}), of which 0.6 square miles (1.6 km^{2}) is land and 0.2 square miles (0.52 km^{2}) (26.51%) is water.

=== Climate ===
Climate data for Samburg, Tennessee (1991–2020 normals, extremes 1928–present)
Month	Jan	Feb	Mar	Apr	May	Jun	Jul	Aug	Sep	Oct	Nov	Dec	Year
Record high °F (°C)	78 (26)	79 (26)	89 (32)	96 (36)	100 (38)	106 (41)	110 (43)	111 (44)	104 (40)	99 (37)	86 (30)	79 (26)	111 (44)
Mean daily maximum °F (°C)	43.9 (6.6)	49.0 (9.4)	58.6 (14.8)	69.1 (20.6)	76.9 (24.9)	84.6 (29.2)	87.0 (30.6)	86.6 (30.3)	81.2 (27.3)	71.3 (21.8)	58.5 (14.7)	48.0 (8.9)	67.9 (19.9)
Daily mean °F (°C)	35.2 (1.8)	39.4 (4.1)	48.5 (9.2)	58.1 (14.5)	66.9 (19.4)	75.0 (23.9)	77.6 (25.3)	76.4 (24.7)	69.9 (21.1)	58.9 (14.9)	48.4 (9.1)	39.1 (3.9)	57.8 (14.3)
Mean daily minimum °F (°C)	26.5 (−3.1)	29.8 (−1.2)	38.4 (3.6)	47.1 (8.4)	56.9 (13.8)	65.3 (18.5)	68.3 (20.2)	66.2 (19.0)	58.6 (14.8)	46.5 (8.1)	38.3 (3.5)	30.3 (−0.9)	47.7 (8.7)
Record low °F (°C)	−15 (−26)	−17 (−27)	7 (−14)	22 (−6)	33 (1)	41 (5)	45 (7)	46 (8)	34 (1)	23 (−5)	5 (−15)	−12 (−24)	−17 (−27)
Average precipitation inches (mm)	4.48 (114)	4.22 (107)	4.95 (126)	5.28 (134)	5.72 (145)	4.24 (108)	3.91 (99)	3.27 (83)	3.85 (98)	3.92 (100)	4.27 (108)	5.06 (129)	53.17 (1,351)
Source: NOAA

== Demographics ==
Historical population
Census	Pop.	Note	%±
1910	111		—
1950	378		—
1960	451		19.3%
1970	463		2.7%
1980	465		0.4%
1990	374		−19.6%
2000	260		−30.5%
2010	217		−16.5%
2020	210		−3.2%

Samburg is part of the Union City, TN–KY Micropolitan Statistical Area.

As of the census of 2000, there were 260 people, 104 households, and 69 families residing in the town. The population density was 428.2 inhabitants per square mile (165.3/km^{2}). There were 161 housing units at an average density of 265.2 units per square mile (102.4 units/km^{2}). The racial makeup of the town was 99.62% White, and 0.38% from two or more races. Hispanic or Latino of any race were 1.15% of the population.

There were 104 households, out of which 27.9% had children under the age of 18 living with them, 50.0% were married couples living together, 10.6% had a female householder with no husband present, and 32.7% were non-families. 23.1% of all households were made up of individuals, and 16.3% had someone living alone who was 65 years of age or older. The average household size was 2.49 and the average family size was 2.87.

In the town, the population was spread out, with 21.2% under the age of 18, 5.8% from 18 to 24, 30.0% from 25 to 44, 24.2% from 45 to 64, and 18.8% who were 65 years of age or older. The median age was 42 years. For every 100 females there were 108.0 males. For every 100 females age 18 and over, there were 107.1 males.

The median income for a household in the town was $26,125, and the median income for a family was $29,167. Males had a median income of $24,583 versus $16,458 for females. The per capita income for the town was $14,162. About 8.3% of families and 13.4% of the population were below the poverty line, including 15.4% of those under the age of eighteen and 15.2% of those 65 or over.

== Media ==
Radio Stations

- WENK-AM 1240 - "The Greatest Hits of All Time"
- WWGY 99.3 - "Today's Best Music with Ace & TJ in the Morning"

== Education ==
Samburg is in the Obion County Schools district.
