= Cunningham, Obion County, Tennessee =

Cunningham, Tennessee
- Unincorporated community
- Location within Tennessee Location within the United States
- Coordinates: 36°14′00″N 89°25′26″W
- Country: United States
- State: Tennessee
- County: Obion
- Elevation: 289 ft (88 m)
- Time zone: UTC-6 (Central (CST))
  - Summer (DST): UTC-5 (CDT)
- Area code: 731
- GNIS feature ID: 1326717

Cunningham is an unincorporated community in Obion County, Tennessee, United States.
