= Jordan, Kentucky =

Unincorporated community in Kentucky, United States

- Unincorporated community
- Location within the state of Kentucky Jordan (the United States)
- Coordinates: 36°30′12″N 89°2′13″W
- Country: United States
- State: Kentucky
- County: Fulton
- Elevation: 400 ft (120 m)
- Time zone: UTC-6 (Central (CST))
  - Summer (DST): UTC-5 (CST)
- GNIS feature ID: 508358

Jordan is an unincorporated community in Fulton County, Kentucky, United States.

Jordan Station was a station on the Memphis and Ohio Railroad.
