= Moscow, Kentucky =

Unincorporated community in Kentucky, United States

Coordinates: 36°36′25″N 89°02′10″W

Moscow is an unincorporated community in Hickman County, Kentucky, in the United States.

== History ==
A post office was established at Moscow in 1829, and remained in operation until it was discontinued in 1955. Moscow was incorporated in 1831.
