= Hornbeak, Tennessee =

Hornbeak, Tennessee Wilsonville, Tennessee
- Town
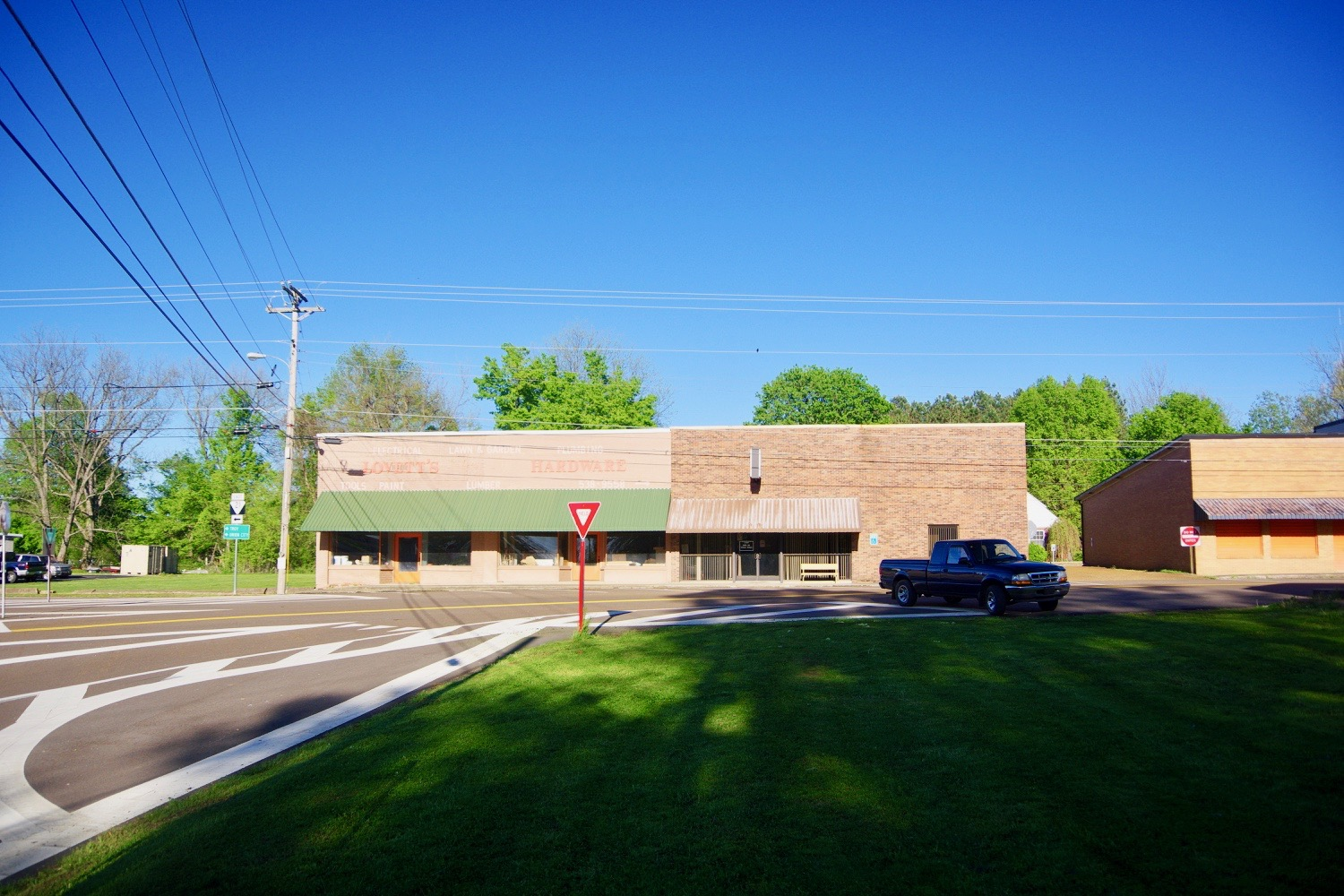
- Old commercial block at the intersection of SR 21 and SR 183

- Location of Hornbeak in Obion County, Tennessee.
- Coordinates: 36°20′2″N 89°17′57″W
- Country: United States
- State: Tennessee
- County: Obion
- Settled: 1850's
- Incorporated: 1916
- Named after: Frank Hornbeak

Government
  - Mayor: Betty Mae Walley
  - Mayor: Betty Walley

Area
  - Total: 1.05 sq mi (2.72 km^{2})
  - Land: 1.05 sq mi (2.72 km^{2})
  - Water: 0 sq mi (0.00 km^{2})
- Elevation: 476 ft (145 m)

Population (2020)
  - Total: 511
  - Density: 486.2/sq mi (187.74/km^{2})
- Time zone: UTC-6 (Central (CST))
  - Summer (DST): UTC-5 (CDT)
- ZIP Code: 38232
- Area code: 731
- FIPS code: 47-36000
- GNIS feature ID: 1288362

Hornbeak is a town in Obion County, Tennessee, United States. As of the 2020 census, Hornbeak had a population of 511. It is part of the Union City, TN–KY Micropolitan Statistical Area.

== History ==
Prior to the establishment of the town, in 1854 a school was started in what locals refer to as "old Center Cemetery," which is located just south of modern-day Hornbeak. The school stayed in operation until 1885.

Hornbeak was originally settled in the 1870s as Wilsonville. By 1887, the name was changed to Hornbeak, after Frank Hornbeak, a local store owner who also served as the postmaster. The town saw its first bank, the Bank of Hornbeak, in 1904, incorporated in 1916 with John Hodge serving as the first mayor.

== Geography ==
According to the United States Census Bureau, the town has a total area of 0.6 sq mi (1.6 km^{2}), all land.

== Demographics ==
Historical population
Census	Pop.	Note	%±
1930	422		—
1940	382		−9.5%
1950	309		−19.1%
1960	307		−0.6%
1970	418		36.2%
1980	452		8.1%
1990	445		−1.5%
2000	435		−2.2%
2010	424		−2.5%
2020	511		20.5%

As of the census of 2000, there were 435 people, 185 households, and 130 families residing in the town. The population density was 697.0 inhabitants per square mile (269.1/km^{2}). There were 205 housing units at an average density of 328.5 per square mile (126.8/km^{2}). The racial makeup of the town was 99.31% White, 0.23% African American, and 0.46% from two or more races.

There were 185 households, out of which 30.8% had children under the age of 18 living with them, 59.5% were married couples living together, 7.0% had a female householder with no husband present, and 29.2% were non-families. Of all households, 25.9% were made up of individuals, and 13.5% had someone living alone who was 65 years of age or older. The average household size was 2.35 and the average family size was 2.81.

In the town, the population was spread out, with 22.8% under the age of 18, 7.1% from 18 to 24, 29.0% from 25 to 44, 23.7% from 45 to 64, and 17.5% who were 65 years of age or older. The median age was 40 years. For every 100 females, there were 87.5 males. For every 100 females age 18 and over, there were 89.8 males.

The median income for a household in the town was $27,153, and the median income for a family was $31,389. Males had a median income of $29,167 versus $20,313 for females. The per capita income for the town was $11,657. About 13.5% of families and 14.7% of the population were below the poverty line, including 3.9% of those under age 18 and 26.5% of those age 65 or over.

== Media ==
Radio stations:

- WENK-AM 1240—"The Greatest Hits of All Time"
- WWGY 99.3—"Today's Best Music with Ace & TJ in the Morning"

== Education ==
It is in the Obion County Schools.
