= Obion, Tennessee =

- Town
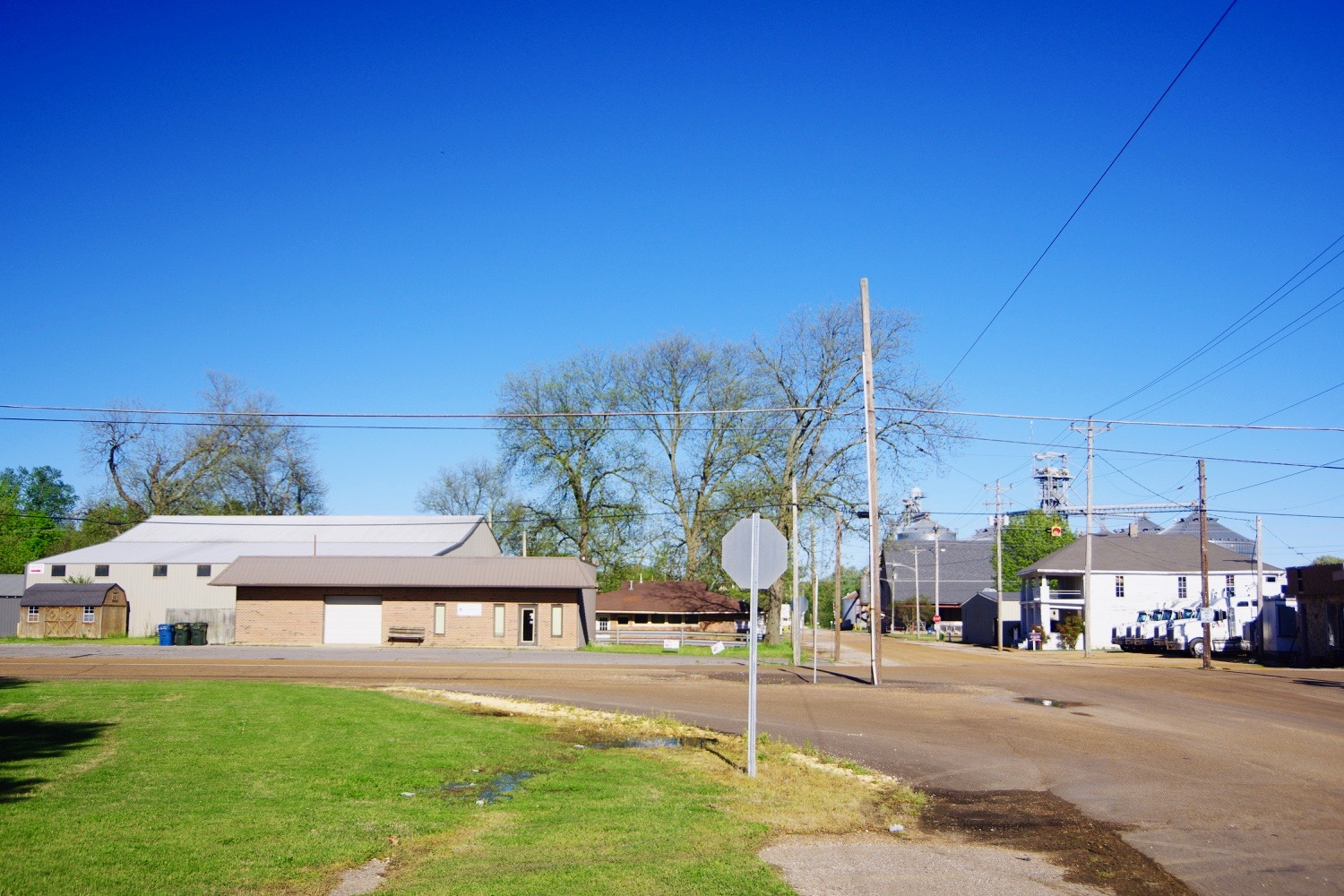
- Obion (SR 183)

- Location of Obion in Obion County, Tennessee.
- Coordinates: 36°15′55″N 89°11′32″W
- Country: United States
- State: Tennessee
- County: Obion
- Established: 1872
- Named for: Obion River

Government
  - Mayor: Rodney Underwood

Area
  - Total: 1.29 sq mi (3.34 km^{2})
  - Land: 1.29 sq mi (3.34 km^{2})
  - Water: 0 sq mi (0.00 km^{2})
- Elevation: 289 ft (88 m)

Population (2020)
  - Total: 991
  - Density: 768.4/sq mi (296.68/km^{2})
- Time zone: UTC-6 (Central (CST))
  - Summer (DST): UTC-5 (CDT)
- ZIP code: 38240
- Area code: 731
- FIPS code: 47-55240
- GNIS feature ID: 1269838
- Website: https://www.obiontn.com/

Obion is a town in Obion County, Tennessee, United States, along the Obion River. As of the 2020 census, Obion had a population of 991. It is part of the Union City, TN–KY Micropolitan Statistical Area.

== History ==
Originally called Obion Station, the community was started in 1872 on land owned by William M. Wilson. The town was a stop on the Chesapeake, Ohio & Southwestern Railroad.

== Geography ==
According to the United States Census Bureau, the town has a total area of 1.2 square miles (3.1 km^{2}), all land.

== Demographics ==
Historical population
Census	Pop.	Note	%±
1890	660		—
1900	1,034		56.7%
1910	1,293		25.0%
1920	1,376		6.4%
1930	1,100		−20.1%
1940	1,151		4.6%
1950	1,212		5.3%
1960	1,097		−9.5%
1970	1,010		−7.9%
1980	1,282		26.9%
1990	1,241		−3.2%
2000	1,134		−8.6%
2010	1,119		−1.3%
2020	991		−11.4%

=== 2020 census ===
Obion racial composition
Race	Num.	Perc.
White (non-Hispanic)	872	87.99%
Black or African American (non-Hispanic)	53	5.35%
Asian	2	0.2%
Other/Mixed	32	3.23%
Hispanic or Latino	32	3.23%

As of the 2020 United States census, there were 991 people, 514 households, and 316 families residing in the town.

=== 2000 census ===
As of the census of 2000, there were 1,134 people, 475 households, and 326 families residing in the town. The population density was 949.1 inhabitants per square mile (366.4/km^{2}). There were 528 housing units at an average density of 441.9 per square mile (170.6/km^{2}). The racial makeup of the town was 93.12% White, 5.64% African American, 0.09% Native American, 0.09% Asian, 0.09% Pacific Islander, 0.09% from other races, and 0.88% from two or more races. Hispanic or Latino of any race were 0.44% of the population.

There were 475 households, out of which 28.8% had children under the age of 18 living with them, 51.8% were married couples living together, 12.8% had a female householder with no husband present, and 31.2% were non-families. 28.4% of all households were made up of individuals, and 16.0% had someone living alone who was 65 years of age or older. The average household size was 2.39 and the average family size was 2.92.

In the town, the population was spread out, with 23.5% under the age of 18, 8.3% from 18 to 24, 26.1% from 25 to 44, 24.2% from 45 to 64, and 17.9% who were 65 years of age or older. The median age was 40 years. For every 100 females, there were 89.0 males. For every 100 females age 18 and over, there were 86.5 males.

The median income for a household in the town was $28,958, and the median income for a family was $36,447. Males had a median income of $30,667 versus $20,066 for females. The per capita income for the town was $14,764. About 13.8% of families and 19.4% of the population were below the poverty line, including 25.3% of those under age 18 and 22.0% of those age 65 or over.

== Industry ==
Obion is home to a 120 million gallon per year ethanol plant operated by POET.

== Media ==
=== Radio Stations ===
- WENK-AM 1240 - "The Greatest Hits of All Time"
- WWGY 99.3 - "Today's Best Music with Ace & TJ in the Morning"

== Education ==
It is in the Obion County Schools.
