= Obion County, Tennessee =

County in Tennessee, United States

- County
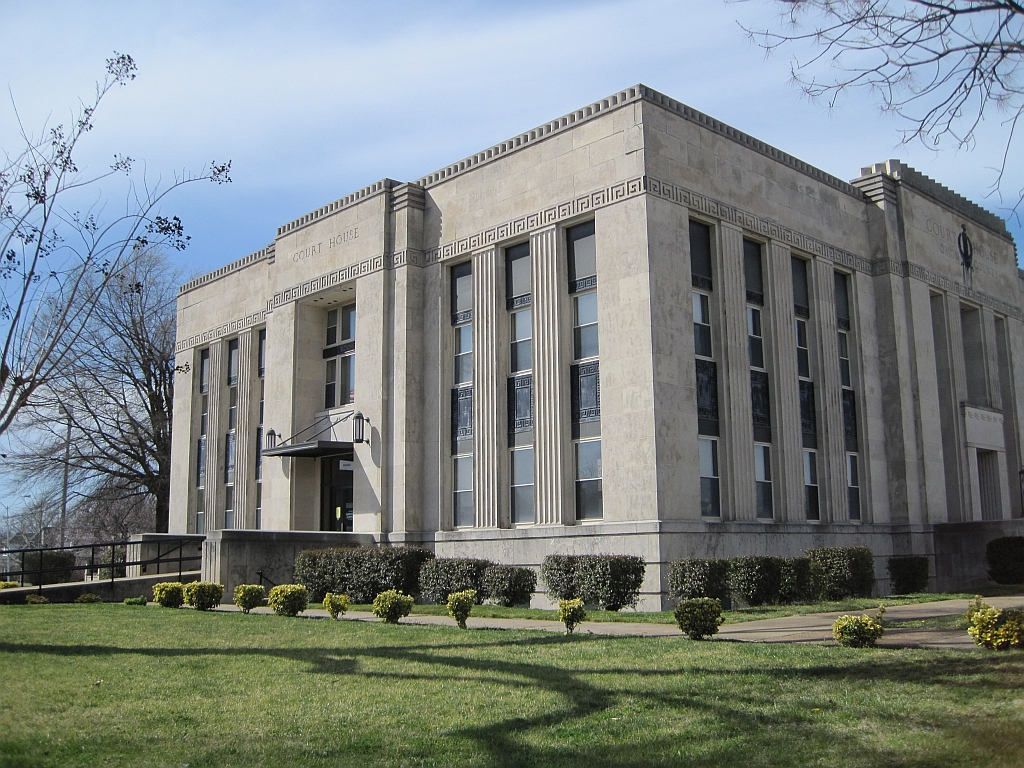
- Obion County Courthouse

- Flag

- Location within the U.S. state of Tennessee
- Coordinates: 36°22′N 89°09′W
- Country: United States
- State: Tennessee
- Founded: 1824
- Named for: Obion River
- Seat: Union City
- Largest city: Union City

Government
  - Mayor: Steve Carr

Area
  - Total: 556 sq mi (1,440 km^{2})
  - Land: 545 sq mi (1,410 km^{2})
  - Water: 11 sq mi (28 km^{2}) 1.9%

Population (2020)
  - Total: 30,787
  - Estimate (2025): 30,067 ▼
  - Density: 58/sq mi (22/km^{2})
- Time zone: UTC−6 (Central)
  - Summer (DST): UTC−5 (CDT)
- Congressional district: 8th
- Website: www.obioncountytn.gov

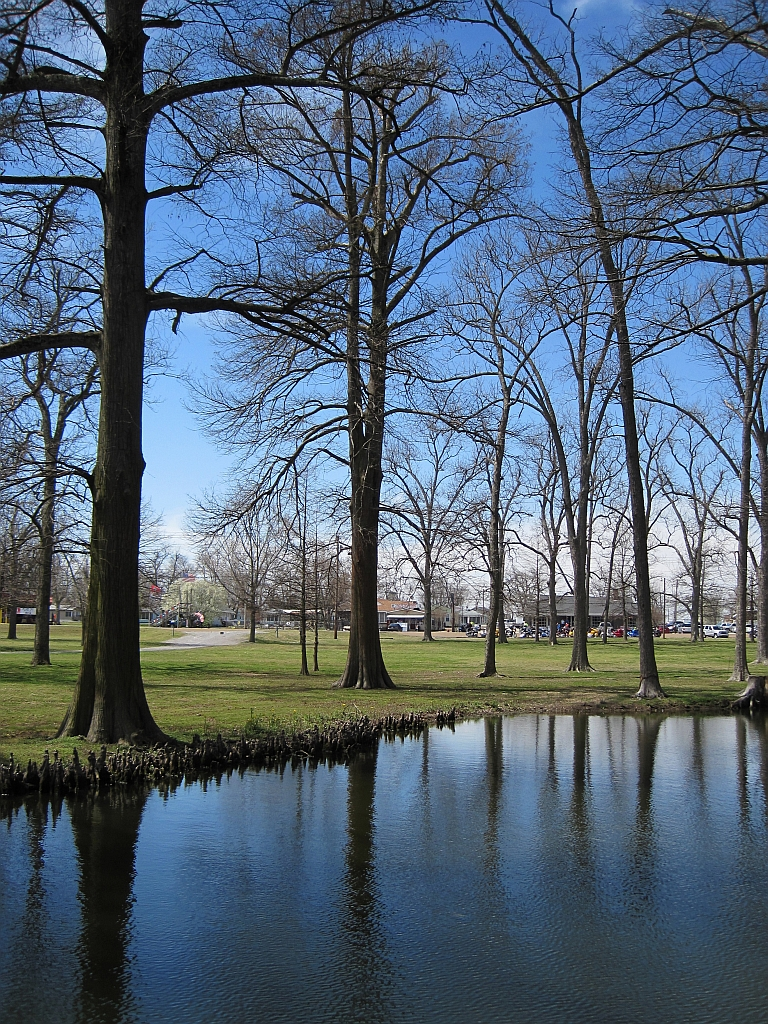
Reelfoot Lake

Obion County is a county located in the northwest corner of the U.S. state of Tennessee. As of the 2020 census, the population was 30,787. The county seat is Union City. The county was formed in 1823 and organized in 1824. It was named after the Obion River.

Obion County is part of the Union City, TN–KY Micropolitan Statistical Area, which is also included in the Martin–Union City, TN Combined Statistical Area.

== History ==
In the year, 1811 there was a large seismic activity located on the New Madrid Fault Line. The series of earthquakes, while devastating, formed Reelfoot Lake.

Obion was later established in 1823 and organized the following year. It was named for the Obion River, which flows through the county and is a tributary of the nearby Mississippi River. The word "Obion" is believed to be derived from a Native American word meaning "many forks", or from an Irish trapper named O'Brien.

The founding of Obion County originally came from the expansion of railroads. The county has since moved towards many agricultural and manufacturing productions.

In 2013, Discovery Park of America opened in Union City. Discovery Park is a 50-acre encyclopedic museum and heritage park with exhibits pertaining to local and national history, military history, art, science, and technology.

== Geography ==
According to the U.S. Census Bureau, the county has a total area of 556 square miles (1,440 km^{2}), of which 545 square miles (1,410 km^{2}) is land and 11 square miles (28 km^{2}) (1.9%) is water. It is located in the "rolling hills of northwest Tennessee".

=== Adjacent counties ===
- Fulton County, Kentucky (north)
- Hickman County, Kentucky (northeast)
- Weakley County (east)
- Gibson County (southeast)
- Dyer County (southwest)
- Lake County (west)

=== National protected area ===
- Reelfoot National Wildlife Refuge (part)

=== State protected areas ===
- Glover Wetland Wildlife Management Area
- Gooch Wildlife Management Area
- Hop-In Refuge
- Obion River Wildlife Management Area (part)
- Reelfoot Lake State Natural Area (part)
- Reelfoot Lake State Park (part)
- Three Rivers Wildlife Management Area

=== Major highways ===
- Future I-69
- US 45
- US 45E
- US 45W
- US 51
- SR 5
- SR 21
- SR 22
- SR 157

== Demographics ==
Historical population
Census	Pop.	Note	%±
1830	2,099		—
1840	4,814		129.3%
1850	7,633		58.6%
1860	12,817		67.9%
1870	15,584		21.6%
1880	22,912		47.0%
1890	27,273		19.0%
1900	28,286		3.7%
1910	29,946		5.9%
1920	28,393		−5.2%
1930	29,086		2.4%
1940	30,978		6.5%
1950	29,056		−6.2%
1960	26,957		−7.2%
1970	29,936		11.1%
1980	32,781		9.5%
1990	31,717		−3.2%
2000	32,450		2.3%
2010	31,807		−2.0%
2020	30,787		−3.2%
2025 (est.)	30,067	▼	−2.3%
U.S. Decennial Census; 1790-1960 1900-1990; 1990-2000 2010-2014

=== 2020 census ===
Obion County racial composition
Race	Num.	Perc.
White (non-Hispanic)	24,736	80.35%
Black or African American (non-Hispanic)	3,137	10.19%
Native American	50	0.16%
Asian	103	0.33%
Other/Mixed	1,187	3.86%
Hispanic or Latino	1,574	5.11%

As of the 2020 census, there were 30,787 people, 12,928 households, and 8,389 families residing in the county.

The median age was 43.6 years, with 21.7% of residents under the age of 18 and 21.3% aged 65 years or older. For every 100 females there were 93.5 males, and for every 100 females age 18 and over there were 91.8 males age 18 and over.

The racial makeup of the county was 81.2% White, 10.3% Black or African American, 0.2% American Indian and Alaska Native, 0.3% Asian, <0.1% Native Hawaiian and Pacific Islander, 2.8% from some other race, and 5.1% from two or more races. Hispanic or Latino residents of any race comprised 5.1% of the population.

40.7% of residents lived in urban areas, while 59.3% lived in rural areas.

Of the 12,928 households, 28.4% had children under the age of 18 living in them, 46.6% were married-couple households, 17.9% were households with a male householder and no spouse or partner present, and 29.3% were households with a female householder and no spouse or partner present. About 29.3% of all households were made up of individuals and 13.9% had someone living alone who was 65 years of age or older; there were 14,314 housing units, of which 9.7% were vacant, 66.5% of occupied units were owner-occupied, and 33.5% were renter-occupied. The homeowner vacancy rate was 1.3% and the rental vacancy rate was 7.4%.

=== 2000 census ===
As of the census of 2000, there were 32,450 people, 13,182 households, and 9,398 families residing in the county. The population density was 60 inhabitants per square mile (23/km^{2}). There were 14,489 housing units at an average density of 27 units per square mile (10/km^{2}). The racial makeup of the county was 88.16% White, 9.85% Black or African American, 0.19% Asian, 0.14% Native American, 0.05% Pacific Islander, 0.91% from other races, and 0.71% from two or more races. 1.90% of the population were Hispanic or Latino of any race.

There were 13,182 households, out of which 31.00% had children under the age of 18 living with them, 56.40% were married couples living together, 11.10% had a female householder with no husband present, and 28.70% were non-families. 25.70% of all households were made up of individuals, and 12.10% had someone living alone who was 65 years of age or older. The average household size was 2.42 and the average family size was 2.89.

In the county, the population was spread out, with 23.40% under the age of 18, 8.40% from 18 to 24, 27.70% from 25 to 44, 25.40% from 45 to 64, and 15.20% who were 65 years of age or older. The median age was 39 years. For every 100 females, there were 93.40 males. For every 100 females age 18 and over, there were 89.90 males.

The median income for a household in the county was $32,764, and the median income for a family was $40,533. Males had a median income of $32,963 versus $20,032 for females. The per capita income for the county was $17,409. About 10.10% of families and 13.30% of the population were below the poverty line, including 18.60% of those under age 18 and 15.10% of those age 65 or over.

== Politics ==
United States presidential election results for Obion County, Tennessee
Year	Republican		Democratic		Third party(ies)	
Year	No.	%	No.	%	No.	%
1912	455	15.89%	2,152	75.17%	256	8.94%
1916	591	15.59%	3,170	83.64%	29	0.77%
1920	1,307	22.25%	4,547	77.41%	20	0.34%
1924	485	12.87%	3,223	85.51%	61	1.62%
1928	789	24.05%	2,492	75.95%	0	0.00%
1932	334	9.36%	3,183	89.18%	52	1.46%
1936	417	10.06%	3,728	89.94%	0	0.00%
1940	536	10.91%	4,360	88.73%	18	0.37%
1944	615	14.31%	3,670	85.39%	13	0.30%
1948	642	13.91%	3,490	75.59%	485	10.50%
1952	2,682	36.51%	4,623	62.94%	40	0.54%
1956	2,349	30.76%	5,185	67.89%	103	1.35%
1960	3,800	46.36%	4,244	51.78%	152	1.85%
1964	2,802	33.07%	5,672	66.93%	0	0.00%
1968	2,420	25.92%	2,235	23.94%	4,680	50.13%
1972	5,800	70.36%	2,243	27.21%	200	2.43%
1976	2,986	28.93%	7,204	69.81%	130	1.26%
1980	5,397	47.49%	5,766	50.73%	202	1.78%
1984	6,384	56.74%	4,769	42.38%	99	0.88%
1988	6,037	55.60%	4,785	44.07%	36	0.33%
1992	4,812	37.41%	6,497	50.51%	1,555	12.09%
1996	4,310	37.36%	6,226	53.97%	1,000	8.67%
2000	6,168	49.58%	6,056	48.68%	216	1.74%
2004	7,859	58.06%	5,549	41.00%	127	0.94%
2008	8,873	66.26%	4,308	32.17%	211	1.58%
2012	8,814	71.68%	3,321	27.01%	162	1.32%
2016	9,526	77.77%	2,426	19.81%	297	2.42%
2020	10,790	79.80%	2,589	19.15%	142	1.05%
2024	10,596	82.14%	2,221	17.22%	83	0.64%

The county is part of District 77 of the Tennessee House of Representatives, currently represented by Republican Rusty Grills, and District 76, currently represented by Republican Tandy Darby. The county is part of District 24 of the Tennessee Senate, currently represented by Republican John Stevens. At the federal level, it is part of the state's 8th congressional district, currently represented by Republican David Kustoff.

== Education ==
There are two school districts: Obion County Schools and Union City Schools.

=== Obion County Schools ===
- School District website

School name	Team mascot	School colors	School website
Lake Road Elementary School	Generals	Blue/Orange	
Hillcrest Elementary School	Cougars	Red/Navy Blue	
Ridgemont Elementary School	Mustangs	Red/Yellow	
Black Oak Elementary School	Eagles	Yellow/Blue	
South Fulton Elementary School	Red Devils	Red/White	
South Fulton Middle and High School	Red Devils	Red/White	
Obion County Central High School	Rebels	Red/White/Blue	

=== Union City Schools ===
- School District Website

School name	Team mascot	School colors	School website
Union City Elementary School	Tornadoes	Purple/Gold	1
Union City Middle School	Tornadoes	Purple/Gold	1
Union City High School	Tornadoes	Purple/Gold	1

== Attractions ==
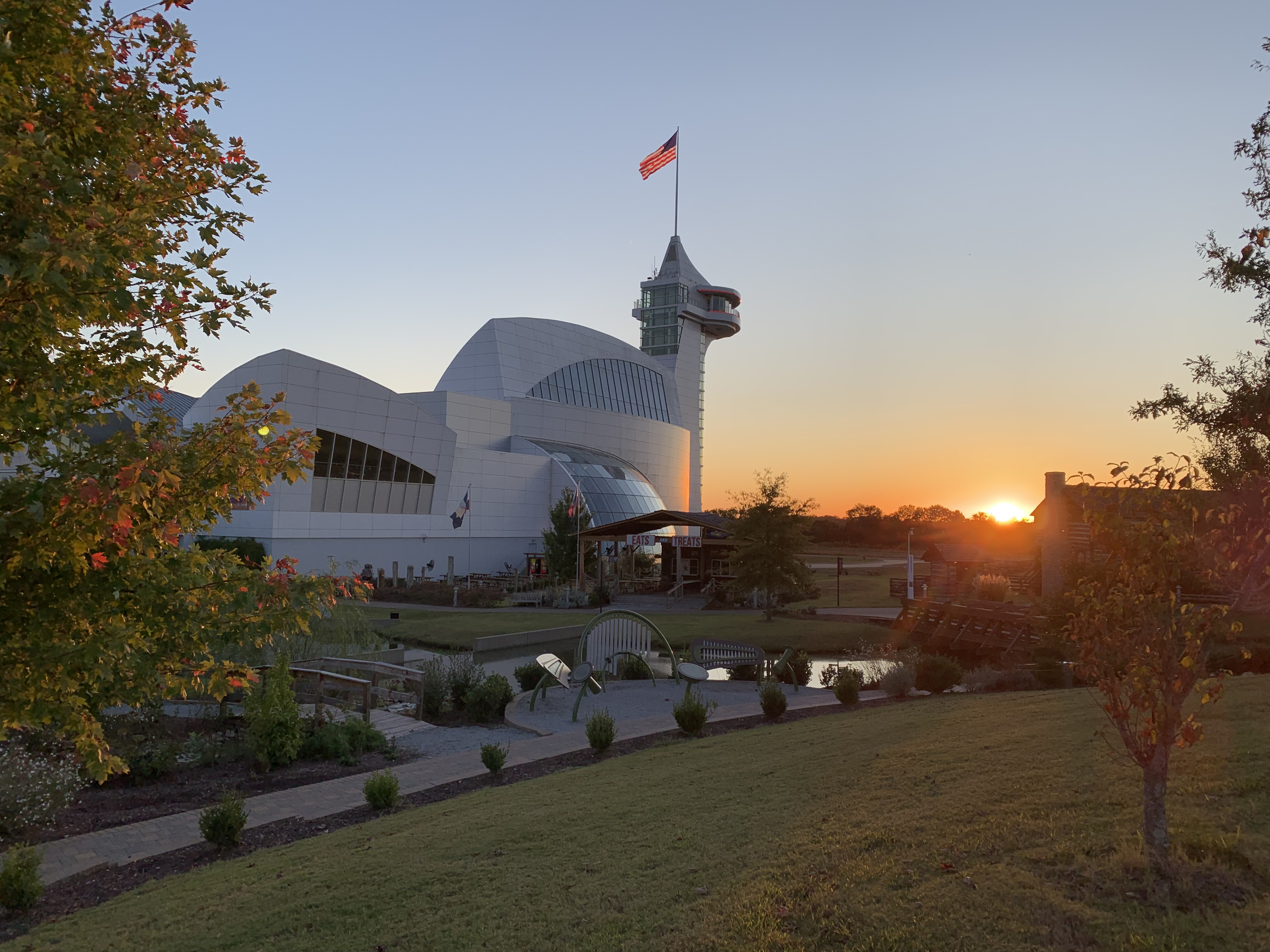
Discovery Park of America in Union City.

Obion County is home to many attractions and activities.

- Discovery Park of America focuses on nature, science, technology, history, and art. Discovery Park is the main source of tourism to Obion County.
- Reelfoot Lake is a protected area in Obion County. It is a venue for hiking, boating, and nature.
- Masquerade Theatre is a local theater groups. What started as the historical Capitol Theater has now been renovated to meet the community's needs.
- The Obion County Fair is one of the biggest events held in the county. Fair Rides, Agricultural displays, pageants, and much more are held in late August every year.

== Media ==
- WENK-AM 1240 "The Greatest Hits of All Time"
- WWGY 99.3 "Today's Best Music with Ace & TJ in the Morning"
- WQAK-FM 105.7 "The Quake" (alternative rock)
- The Union City Daily Messenger, the county's newspaper since 1926

== Other services ==
Obion County has a public library, with a 30,000-square-foot (2,800 m^{2}) building and a catalog of over 70,000 books, video and audio materials.

Residents of the county's unincorporated communities have the option of paying $75 per year if they want firefighting services from the city of South Fulton.

== Communities ==
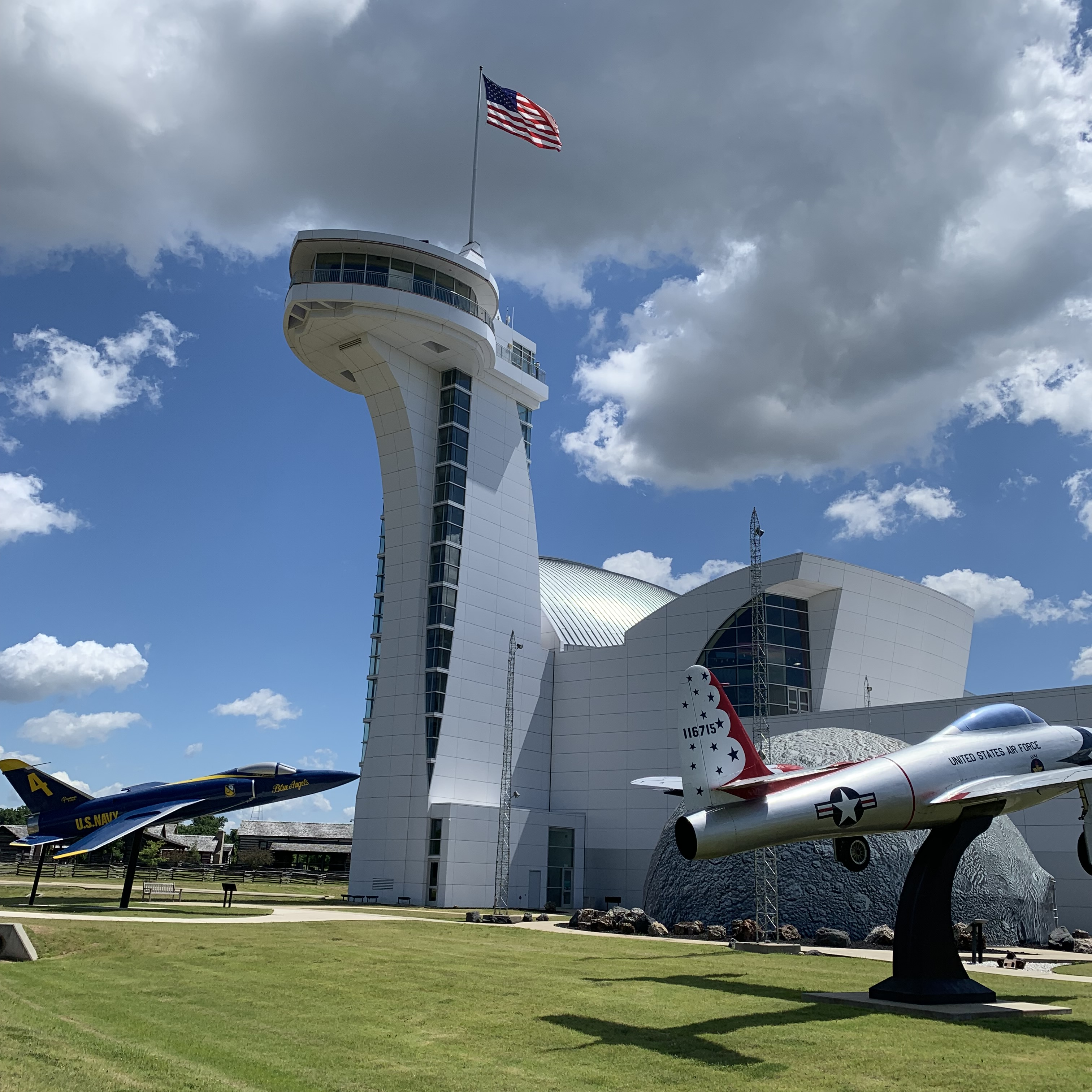
The Tower at Discovery Park of America

=== Cities ===
- South Fulton
- Union City (county seat)
- Woodland Mills

=== Towns ===
- Hornbeak
- Kenton (partly in Gibson County)
- Obion
- Rives
- Samburg
- Trimble (mostly in Dyer County)
- Troy

=== Unincorporated communities ===
- Cunningham
- Dixie
- Midway
- Protemus
- Walnut Log

== See also ==
- National Register of Historic Places listings in Obion County, Tennessee
