= Obion County Schools =

School district in Tennessee, United States

Address
- 1700 North 5th Street; Union City, Tennessee 38261 United States

District information
- Type: Public school (government funded)
- Motto: Preparing Students for the Challenges of Tomorrow
- Grades: PK-12
- Superintendent: Tim Watkins
- Asst. superintendent(s): Dr. Gregory Barclay
- Schools: 3 Primary; 2 Middle; 2 High

Other information
- Website: www.obioncountyschools.com

Obion County Schools is a school district headquartered in Union City, Tennessee. The district serves the entire county except for those served by the Union City Schools District.

== Schools ==
Elementary Schools

- Hillcrest Elementary in Troy, Tennessee serving grades PK-5
- Lake Road Elementary in Union City, Tennessee serving grades PK-5
- South Fulton Elementary in South Fulton, Tennessee serving grades PK-5

High Schools

- Obion County Central High School in Troy, Tennessee, serving grades 9-12

Middle Schools

- Obion County Middle School in Union City, Tennessee serving grades 6-8

Middle and High Schools

- South Fulton Middle and High School in South Fulton, Tennessee serving grades 6-12
