= Troy, Tennessee =

- Town
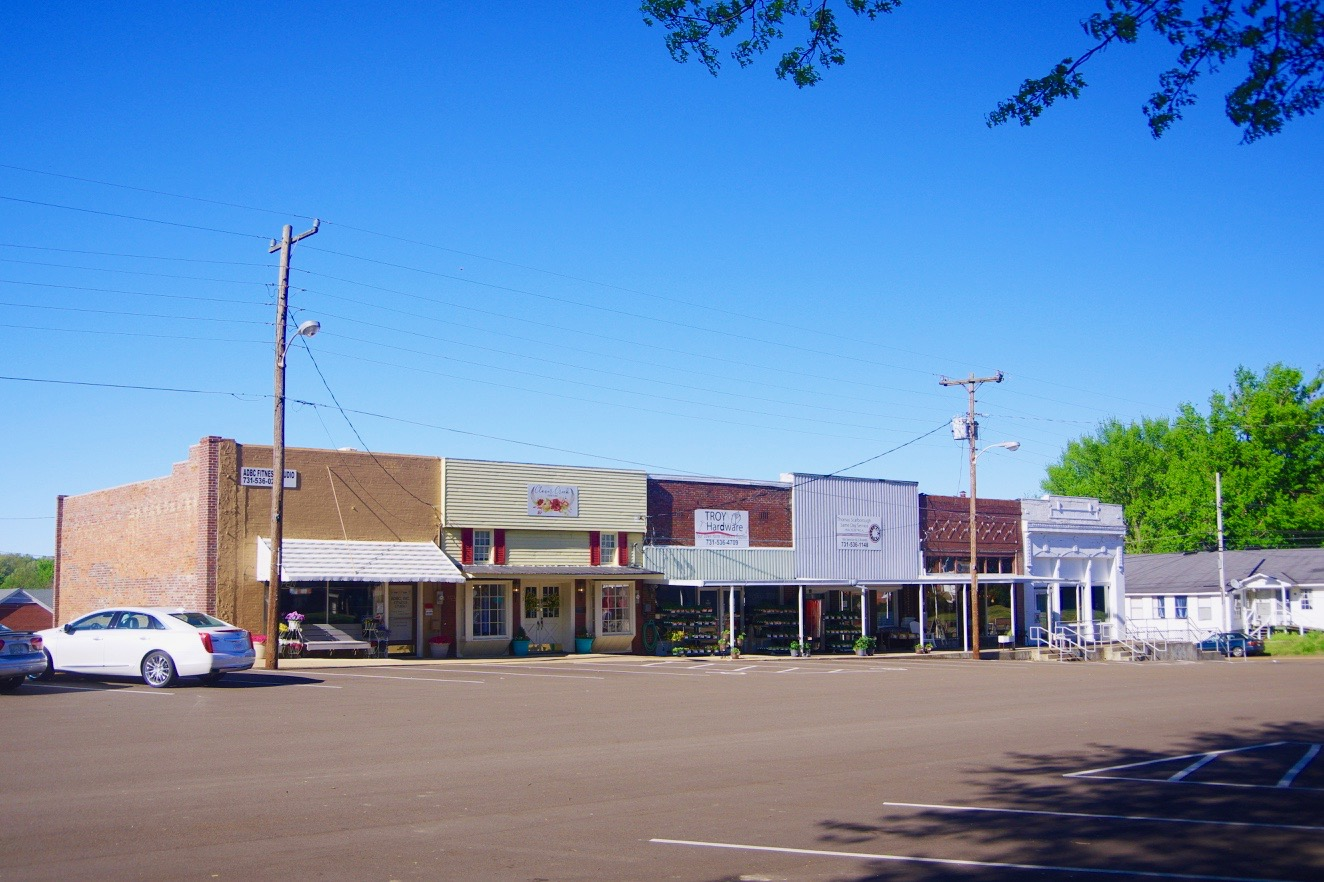
- Westbrook Street
- Motto: "Nice People Live Here"
- Location of Troy in Obion County, Tennessee.
- Coordinates: 36°20′27″N 89°9′24″W
- Country: United States
- State: Tennessee
- County: Obion
- Founded: 1825
- Incorporated: 1901
- Named for: Ancient Troy

Government
  - Mayor: Deanna Chappell

Area
  - Total: 1.35 sq mi (3.50 km^{2})
  - Land: 1.35 sq mi (3.50 km^{2})
  - Water: 0 sq mi (0.00 km^{2})
- Elevation: 377 ft (115 m)

Population (2020)
  - Total: 1,423
  - Density: 1,054.2/sq mi (407.04/km^{2})
- Time zone: UTC-6 (Central (CST))
  - Summer (DST): UTC-5 (CDT)
- ZIP code: 38260
- Area code: 731
- FIPS code: 47-75240
- GNIS feature ID: 1272918
- Website: Town website

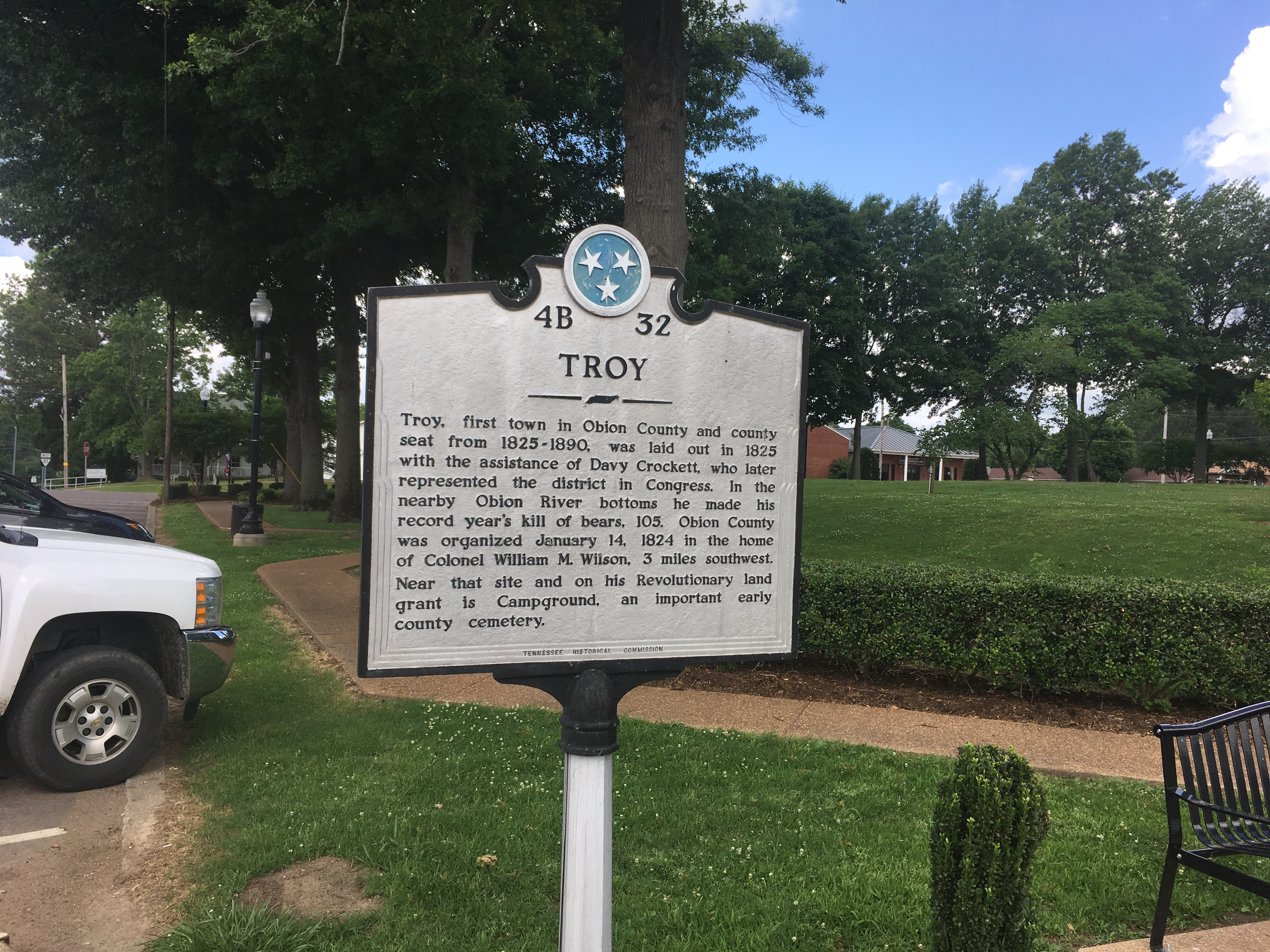
Historical marker in Troy, Tennessee

Troy is a town in Obion County, Tennessee, United States. The population was 1,423 at the 2020 census. It is part of the Union City, TN–KY Micropolitan Statistical Area.

== History ==
Troy was founded in 1825 as the original county seat of Obion County. Frontiersman Davy Crockett was in attendance when the town was planted. The Paducah & Memphis Railroad extended its line from Union City to Trimble in May 1874. The line did not go through the town, but bypassed it to the south. In 1888, the Troy and Tiptonville Railroad started operations. This was a short line that connected the town with the (former Paducah & Memphis Railroad) Illinois Central Railroad at Moffat on the ICC line. Troy remained the county seat until 1890, when it was moved to Union City following a contentious legal dispute.

== Geography ==
According to the United States Census Bureau, Troy has a total area of 1.4 square miles (3.6 km^{2}), all land.

== Demographics ==
Historical population
Census	Pop.	Note	%±
1850	177		—
1870	500		—
1880	341		−31.8%
1890	394		15.5%
1900	416		5.6%
1910	529		27.2%
1920	516		−2.5%
1930	522		1.2%
1940	513		−1.7%
1950	593		15.6%
1960	587		−1.0%
1970	826		40.7%
1980	1,093		32.3%
1990	1,047		−4.2%
2000	1,273		21.6%
2010	1,371		7.7%
2020	1,423		3.8%

=== 2020 census ===
Troy racial composition
Race	Num.	Perc.
White (non-Hispanic)	1,321	92.83%
Black or African American (non-Hispanic)	20	1.41%
Native American	3	0.21%
Other/Mixed	47	3.3%
Hispanic or Latino	32	2.25%

As of the 2020 United States Census, there were 1,423 people, 684 households, and 464 families residing in the town.

=== 2000 census ===
As of the census of 2000, there were 1,273 people, 533 households, and 367 families residing in the town. The population density was 896.7 inhabitants per square mile (346.2/km^{2}). There were 576 housing units at an average density of 405.7 units per square mile (156.6 units/km^{2}). The racial makeup of the town was 98.35% White, 1.26% African American, 0.16% from other races, and 0.24% from two or more races. Hispanic or Latino of any race were 1.26% of the population.

There were 533 households, out of which 30.4% had children under the age of 18 living with them, 55.5% were married couples living together, 10.3% had a female householder with no husband present, and 31.1% were non-families. 28.0% of all households were made up of individuals, and 13.7% had someone living alone who was 65 years of age or older. The average household size was 2.39 and the average family size was 2.89.

In the town, the population was spread out, with 23.4% under the age of 18, 9.0% from 18 to 24, 28.8% from 25 to 44, 23.5% from 45 to 64, and 15.3% who were 65 years of age or older. The median age was 36 years. For every 100 females, there were 88.9 males. For every 100 females age 18 and over, there were 85.7 males.

The median income for a household in the town was $30,664, and the median income for a family was $38,500. Males had a median income of $28,594 versus $20,208 for females. The per capita income for the town was $15,255. About 12.5% of families and 14.6% of the population were below the poverty line, including 14.1% of those under age 18 and 25.4% of those age 65 or over.

== Media ==
Radio Stations

- WENK-AM 1240 - "The Greatest Hits of All Time"
- WWGY 99.3 - "Today's Best Music with Ace & TJ in the Morning"

== Education ==
It is in the Obion County Schools.

== Notable people ==
- Thomas Rogers Shearon, Tennessee state senator.
- Herbert L. Wilkerson, Major general in the Marine Corps and Veteran of World War II, Korea and Vietnam.
