= Tennessee State Route 224 =

State highway in Tennessee, United States

State Route 224
- SR 224 highlighted in red

Route information
- Maintained by TDOT
- Length: 26.6 mi (42.8 km)
- Existed: July 1, 1983–present

Major junctions
- South end: SR 22 in Michie
- SR 57 in Michie; US 64 near Adamsville
- North end: SR 22A in Enville

Location
- Country: United States
- State: Tennessee
- Counties: McNairy, Chester

Highway system
- Tennessee State Routes; Interstate; US; State
← SR 223	→ SR 225

State Route 224 (SR 224) is a 26.6 miles (42.8 km) north-south state highway that is located almost entirely in McNairy County, Tennessee, United States, connecting Michie with Enville via Stantonville and Adamsville.

== Route description ==
SR 224 begins in McNairy County in downtown Michie at an intersection with SR 22. It heads north along Michie Pebble Hill Road to have an intersection with SR 57 before leaving Michie and passing through some wooded areas. The highway then enters farmland shortly before entering Stantonville, where it has a short concurrency with SR 142. SR 224 the leaves Stantonville along Gilchrist Stantonville Road to pass through farmland before making a sharp left turn at an intersection with Gilchrist Road to come to an intersection with US 64/SR 15, which it becomes concurrent with. They head northeast to the extreme western edge of the Adamsville city limits, where SR 224 splits off along Leapwood Enville Road to go northwest, then north through farmland. It then enters wooded areas and passes through Leapwood, where it has an intersection with SR 199. The highway continues to wind its way north through a mix of farmland and wooded areas to enter Enville just shortly before crossing into Chester County. SR 224 then comes to an end at an intersection with SR 22A in downtown. Excluding the concurrency with US 64/SR 15, the entire route of SR 224 is a two-lane highway.

== Major intersections ==
County	Location	mi	km	Destinations	Notes
McNairy	Michie	0.0	0.0	SR 22 – Corinth, MS, Crump	Southern terminus
McNairy	Michie			SR 57 – Eastview, Southside	
McNairy	Stantonville			SR 142 east – Shiloh, Shiloh National Military Park	Southern end of SR 142 concurrency
McNairy	Stantonville			SR 142 west – Selmer	Northern end of SR 142 concurrency
McNairy				US 64 west (SR 15 west) – Selmer	Southern end of US 64/SR 15 concurrency
McNairy				US 64 east (SR 15 east) – Adamsville	Northern end of US 64/SR 15 concurrency
McNairy	Leapwood			SR 199 west (Finger-Leapwood Road) – Finger	Eastern terminus of SR 199
Chester	Enville	26.6	42.8	SR 22A (Main Street) – Jacks Creek, Milledgeville	Northern terminus
1.000 mi = 1.609 km; 1.000 km = 0.621 mi: Concurrency terminus
