= Tennessee State Route 117 =

State highway in Tennessee, United States

State Route 117
- Shiloh-Adamsville Road
- SR 117 highlighted in red

Route information
- Maintained by TDOT
- Length: 5.20 mi (8.37 km)

Major junctions
- South end: SR 142 near Shiloh National Military Park
- North end: US 64 / SR 22 at Adamsville

Location
- Country: United States
- State: Tennessee
- Counties: McNairy

Highway system
- Tennessee State Routes; Interstate; US; State
← SR 116	→ SR 118

State Route 117 (SR 117) is a very short state highway in extreme eastern McNairy County, Tennessee. This highway passes through one town (Adamsville) and acts as a shortcut from Adamsville to the nearby Shiloh National Military Park.

== Route description ==
SR 117 begins near Shiloh National Military Park at an intersection with SR 142 between Stantonville and Hurley, in a community known as West Shiloh. The highway heads north as a 2-lane highway through farmland to have an intersection with Gilchrist Road, which serves as a connector to SR 224. SR 117 then enters Adamsville and has an intersection with Old Shiloh Road before entering downtown, where it comes to an end at an intersection with US 64/SR 15/SR 22.

The entire route is in McNairy County.

== Major intersections ==
The entire route is in McNairy County.

Location	mi	km	Destinations	Notes
West Shiloh	0.0	0.0	SR 142 – Stantonville, Shiloh National Military Park	Southern terminus
Adamsville	5.2	8.4	US 64 / SR 22 (Main Street/N Maple Street/SR 15) – Selmer, Milledgeville, Crump, Savannah	Northern terminus
1.000 mi = 1.609 km; 1.000 km = 0.621 mi
