= Tennessee State Route 22 =

State Highway in Tennessee

State Route 22
- SR 22; primary in red, secondary in yellow, business in green, alternate in blue

Route information
- Maintained by TDOT
- Length: 172.8 mi (278.1 km)
- Existed: October 1, 1923–present

Major junctions
- South end: MS 2 near Corinth, MS
- US 64 in Crump; US 412 / SR 104 in Lexington; I-40 in Parkers Crossroads; US 70 in Huntingdon; US 79 in McKenzie; US 45E in Martin; US 45W / US 51 in Union City; Future I-69 / SR 690 in Union City
- North end: Kentucky Bend

Location
- Country: United States
- State: Tennessee
- Counties: McNairy; Hardin; Chester; Henderson; Carroll; Henry; Weakley; Obion; Lake

Highway system
- Tennessee State Routes; Interstate; US; State
← SR 21	→ US 23

State Route 22 (SR 22) is a 172.8-mile-long (278.1 km) south-to-north state highway in the western part of Tennessee, United States. It begins at the Mississippi state line in McNairy County, where the roadway continues as Mississippi Highway 2 (MS 2). It ends at the Kentucky state line in Lake County, when it crosses into the Kentucky Bend, a detached portion of Fulton County, Kentucky. The monument for the 1862 Battle of Island Number Ten in the American Civil War is located on SR 22, about three miles (4.8 km) north of Tiptonville.

== Route description ==
=== McNairy County ===
SR 22 begins as a primary highway in McNairy County at the Mississippi state line, where the highway continues south as MS 2. The highway travels north as a two-lane highway, passing through the community of Acton before entering the town of Michie and intersecting SR 224. It then passes through town before coming to an intersection with SR 57. SR 22 then leaves Michie and crosses into Hardin County.

=== Hardin County ===
SR 22 continues north into the community of Shiloh and becomes concurrent with SR 142, with which it remains concurrent to the community of Hurley, where SR 142 splits off and goes west, while SR 22 turns northeast and enters Shiloh National Military Park. The highway passes through the park before turning north again to run alongside the Tennessee River, which it does so to its junction with U.S. Route 64 (US 64)/SR 69/SR 15 in Crump. In Crump, SR 22 turns west to become concurrent with US 64/SR 69/SR 15, with SR 69 splitting off to the north about 1/2 mile (0.80 km) later. US 64/SR 15/SR 22 continue west, as a four-lane undivided highway, and cross back into McNairy County.

=== McNairy County ===
The roadway almost immediately enters the town of Adamsville and comes to an intersection with SR 117, where SR 22 leaves US 64/SR 15 and turns north again, once again as a two-lane highway, and passes through the community of Mud Creek before becoming concurrent with SR 69 for a second time just south of Milledgeville. They then enter Milledgeville and come to the southern terminus of SR 22's alternate route, SR 22A. Here, SR 22A turns west while SR 69 turns east and leaves SR 22, leaving SR 22 to continue north alone and cross into Chester County.

=== Chester County ===
Continuing north, from here SR 22 crosses over Short Branch, then Dry Branch, before passing through farmland and countryside before having an intersection with SR 201 before crossing into Henderson County.

=== Henderson County ===
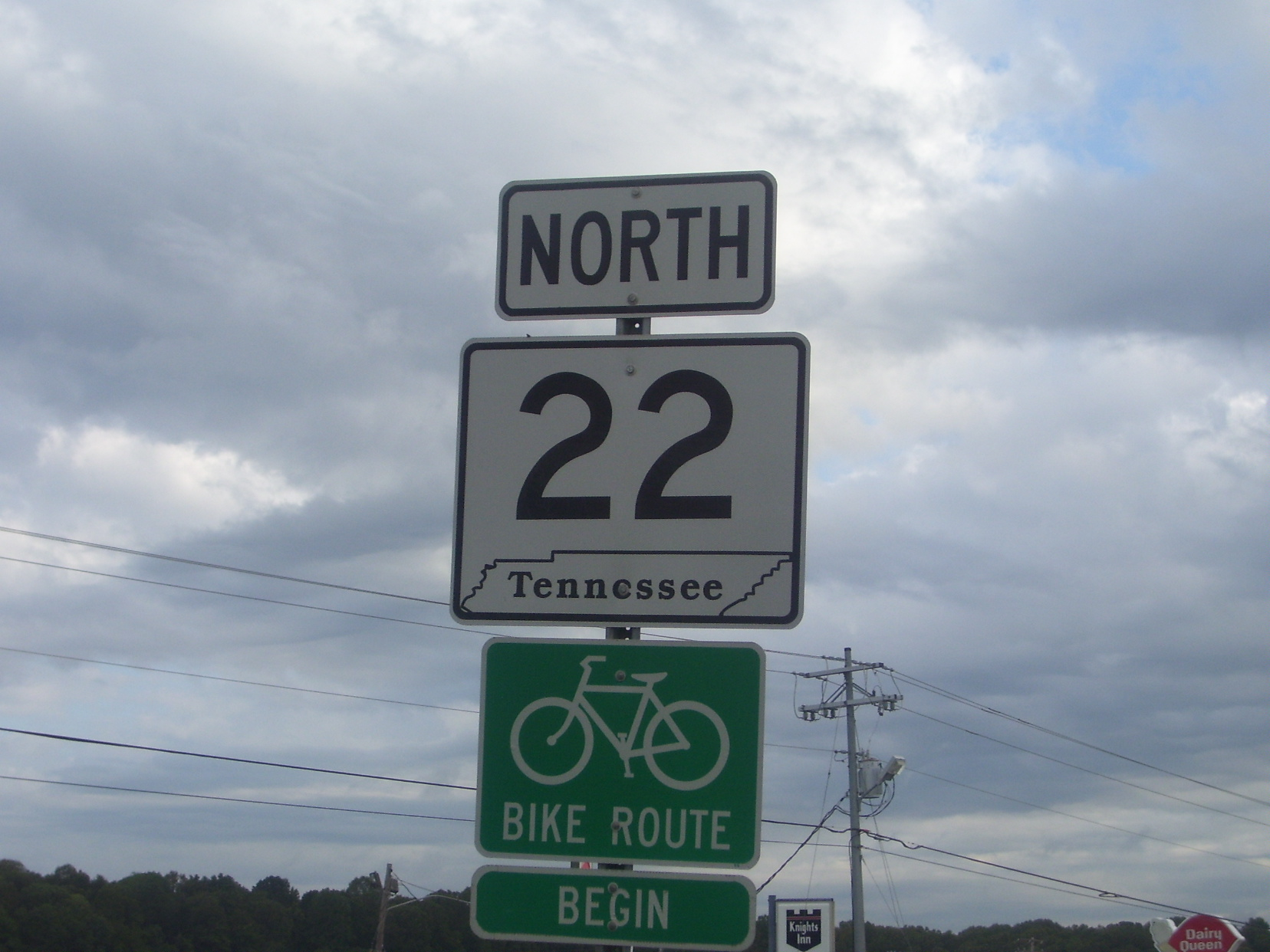
SR 22 shield north of Interstate 40 (I-40) in Henderson County, July 2007

SR 22 then continues through the countryside to a junction with SR 100. It continues north through mostly wooded areas before entering Lexington and widening to an undivided four-lane highway, just before meeting the northern terminus of SR 22A. The highway then crosses the Beech River to enter a small business district before entering downtown and becoming concurrent with SR 104 for a short distance before coming to an intersection with US 412/SR 20, where it splits off to go east on that route. SR 22 continues north, passing through some neighborhoods before leaving Lexington and crossing the Big Sandy River to enter the countryside. It then crosses both Big Beaver Creek and Little Beaver Creek before entering Parkers Crossroads and having an interchange with Interstate 40 (I-40; Exit 108). SR 22 then passes by a few businesses and a city park before leaving Parkers Crossroads and crossing into Carroll County.

=== Carroll County ===
SR 22 immediately becomes a divided highway and passes through a wooded area before entering Clarksburg and becoming undivided once again. It has a short concurrency with SR 424 through town before leaving Clarksburg and becoming divided once again. SR 22 then passes through the communities of Anark and Davis Chapel before entering Huntingdon and coming to an interchange and becoming concurrent with US 70/SR 364, turning west to come to an intersection with SR 22 Business, which follows SR 22's old route through downtown. The highway then narrows to two lanes and curves around to an intersection with US 70 Business/SR 1, where US 70 Bus and SR 364 both end and US 70/SR 1 continue southeast, leaving SSR 22 to continue east to an intersection with US 70A/SR 77, where it turns north to become concurrent with that route. They then curve to the northeast before meeting the northern end of SR 22 Bus, where SR 22 leaves US 70A/SR 77 and continues north on its own alignment as a four-lane divided highway, leaving Huntington. The highway goes through countryside again, passing by the Carroll County Airport, before entering McKenzie and having an intersection with SR 124. SR 22 then has junction with SR 423 just before a major interchange with US 79/SR 76, just before crossing into Henry County.

=== Henry County ===
SR 22 passes through some neighborhoods before having a junction with SR 140. It then passes through some more neighborhoods before crossing into Weakley County.

=== Weakley County ===
SR 22 passes through yet another neighborhood before leaving McKenzie and becoming divided once more. It then passes through the town of Gleason and has an intersection with SR 190. It then passes through farmland and passes by the Tater Town Raceway before becoming undivided and entering Dresden by crossing the Middle Fork of the Obion River. It first has an intersection with SR 217 before going through an industrial area and business district, and then having an intersection with SR 54 just south of downtown. SR 22 then has intersections with SR 89 and SR 239 before leaving Dresden and becoming divided again. It then passes through farmland again before entering Martin at an interchange with the US 45E/SR 216 freeway, where SR 22 turns north to be concurrent with the freeway via flyover ramps while the roadway continues into downtown as SR 431 (Old SR 22). They have an interchange with Industrial Park Drive before coming to the northern end of US 45E Business, where US 45E splits off to go north, and SR 22 continues alone along the freeway. It then has two more interchanges, at SR 43 and SR 431 (Old SR 22), before leaving Martin and going northwest. It then has an interchange at Terrell Road before crossing the Obion River into Obion County.

=== Obion County ===
SR 22 immediately enters Union City and has another interchange with SR 431 (Old SR 22); it then has an interchange with Tyson Drive before coming to an interchange with US 45W/SR 184 and SR 214, the final interchange before the freeway comes to an end at an interchange with US 51/SR 3. SR 22 is concurrent with US 45W between these final two interchanges. SR 22 then merges to become concurrent with US 51/SR 3 south, completely bypassing downtown to the north as a four-lane divided highway. They then have an intersection with SR 21 before curving to the south and coming to an intersection with SR 5, where SR 22 turns east to become concurrent with that route as a four-lane undivided highway. SR 22/SR 5 then pass by some businesses and a diamond interchange with SR 690 (Future I-69) before narrowing to two lanes and coming to a "Y" intersection where SR 22 and SR 5 split, with SR 22 turning northwest to leave Union City as a two-lane Highway. SR 22 then turns predominantly west and passes through farmland and the community of Dixie before winding around to an intersection with SR 157. It then turns southwest and passes between two hills before entering Samburg. The highway passes through downtown before running along the shores of Reelfoot Lake and coming to a "Y" intersection with SR 21 to become concurrent with that highway. They then leave Samburg and continue along the banks of the lake to cross the Hill–Talley Bridge over the Reelfoot Lake Spillway to cross into Lake County.

=== Lake County ===
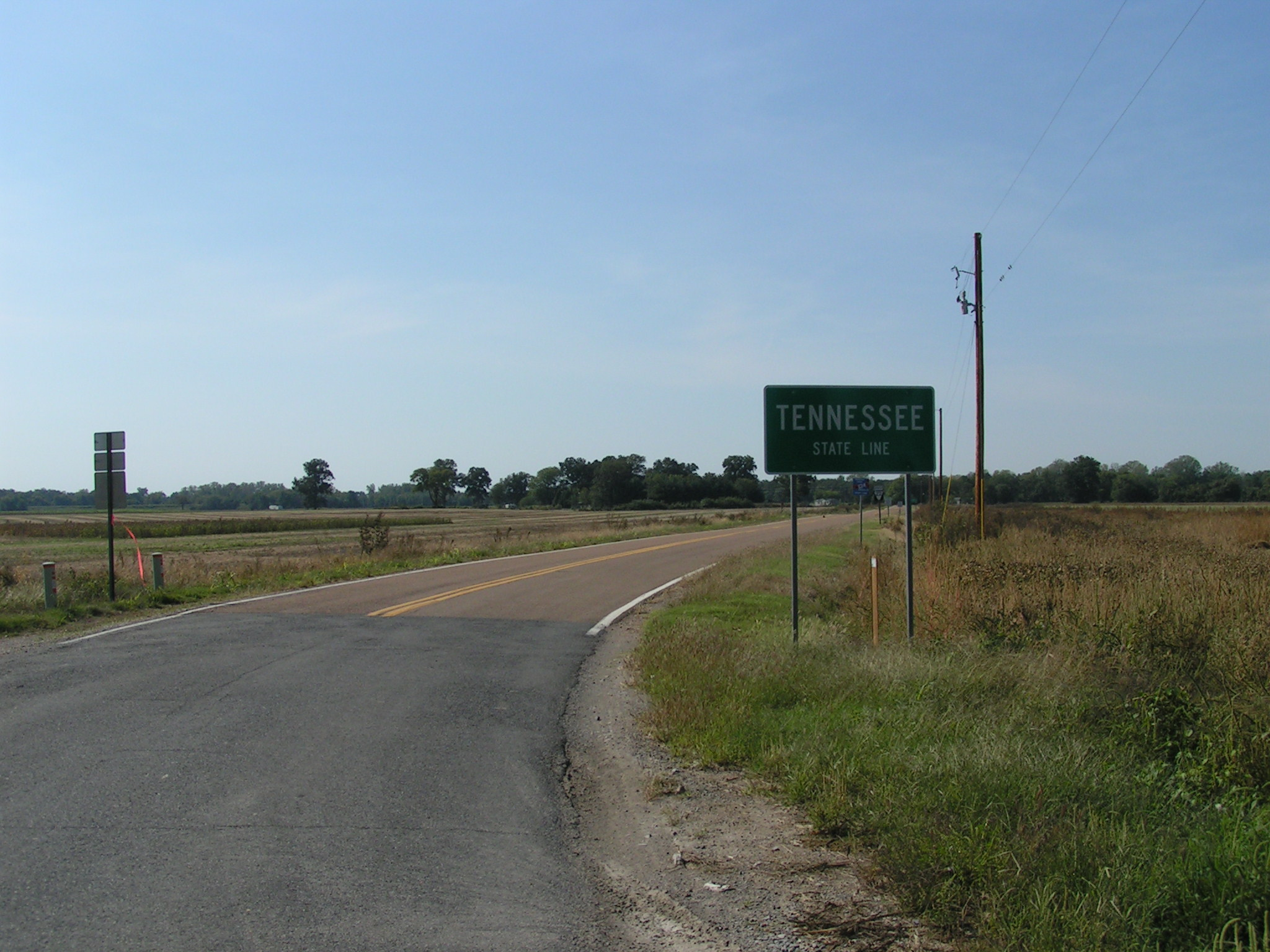
State line between the Kentucky Bend and SR 22 in Tennessee, October 2007: No sign announces entering Kentucky, but a sign on return announces entering Tennessee. A "State Route 22" sign is visible between the posts of the state line sign.

SR 21 and SR 22 continue along the banks of the lake and pass through Reelfoot Lake State Park before turning west, away from the lake, and entering Tiptonville. They pass by some houses before coming to an intersection with SR 78, where SR 22 splits from SR 21 and has a short concurrency with SR 78 before following a new bypass of downtown, and SR 22 downgrades to a secondary highway. Until recently, SR 22 followed SR 21 to enter downtown and came to an intersection where they split, with SR 21 following Church Street west to the Mississippi River, while SR 22 followed Cedar Street. SR 22 turns north again to leave Tiptonville. The highway then passes through farmland and has an intersection with SR 212 before making a series of meandering left and right turns before coming to the Kentucky state line, where the road continues north as Kentucky Bend Road into the Kentucky Bend.

== History ==
Future Interstate 169
- Location: Martin–Union City

The SR 22 freeway section from Martin to Union City was proposed to be Interstate 169 (I-169), a 15-mile-long (24 km) auxiliary route of I-69 in a Senate Joint Resolution 512 by the Tennessee Senate in 2002. However, the resolution failed to pass the Tennessee House of Representatives.

== Major intersections ==
County	Location	mi	km	Destinations	Notes
McNairy	Michie	0.0	0.0	MS 2 west – Corinth Miss	Continuation into Mississippi
McNairy	Michie	4.6	7.4	SR 224 north (Michie–Pebble Hill Road) – Stantonville	Southern terminus of SR 224
McNairy	Michie	7.6	12.2	SR 57 – Pickwick Landing, Eastview	
Hardin	Shiloh	11.5	18.5	SR 142 south – Southside	Southern end of SR 142 concurrency
Hardin	Hurley	13.1	21.1	SR 142 north – Selmer	Northern end of SR 142 concurrency
Hardin	Crump	19.9	32.0	US 64 east / SR 69 south (SR 15 east) – Savannah	Southern end of US 64/SR 15/SR 69 concurrency
Hardin	Crump	20.1	32.3	SR 69 north – Morris Chapel	Northern end of SR 69 concurrency
McNairy	Adamsville	24.0	38.6	US 64 west (East Main Street/SR 15 west) / SR 117 south (South Maple Street) – Selmer	Northern end of US 64/SR 15 concurrency; northern terminus of SR 117
McNairy		32.8	52.8	SR 69 south – Morris Chapel	Southern end of SR 69 concurrency
McNairy	Milledgeville	33.8	54.4	SR 22A north / SR 69 north (Saltillo Road) – Enville, Saltillo	Northern end of SR 69 concurrency; southern terminus of SR 22A
Chester		40.5	65.2	SR 201 north – Sardis	Southern terminus of SR 201
Henderson		42.5	68.4	SR 100 – Henderson, Scotts Hill	
Henderson	Lexington			SR 459 west to SR 22A south – Jackson	Eastern terminus of SR 459
Henderson	Lexington	51.7	83.2	SR 22A south (Cook Street) – Jacks Creek	Northern terminus of SR 22A
Henderson	Lexington	52.3	84.2	Bridge over the Beech River	
Henderson	Lexington	53.7	86.4	US 412 / SR 104 (SR 20/Church Street) – Jackson, Parsons	
Henderson	Lexington	57.9	93.2	Bridge over the Beech River	
Henderson		60.0	96.6	Bridge over the Big Sandy River	
Henderson	Parkers Crossroads	63.5	102.2	I-40 – Memphis, Nashville	I-40 exit 108
Carroll	Clarksburg	68.9	110.9	SR 424 east (Murphy Lane) – Yuma	Southern end of SR 424 concurrency
Carroll	Clarksburg	69.1	111.2	SR 424 west	Northern end of SR 424 concurrency
Carroll	Huntingdon	77.4	124.6	US 70 east (SR 364 east/Veterans Drive South) – Camden	Interchange; southern end of US 70/SR 364 concurrency
Carroll	Huntingdon	78.4	126.2	SR 22 Bus. north (Lexington Street)	Southern terminus of SR 22 Business
Carroll	Huntingdon	79.7	128.3	US 70 west / US 70 Bus. east (West Main Street/SR 1) – Jackson	Northern end of US 70 concurrency; western terminus of US 70 Business and SR 364
Carroll	Huntingdon	80.5	129.6	US 70A west (SR 77 west) – McLemoresville	Southern end of US 70A/SR 77 concurrency
Carroll	Huntingdon	81.9	131.8	US 70A east (Veterans Drive North/SR 77 east) / SR 22 Bus. south (Paris Street) – Bruceton	Northern end of US 70A/SR 77 concurrency; northern terminus of SR 22 Business
Carroll	McKenzie	88.6	142.6	SR 124 west (Old McKenzie Road)	Eastern terminus of SR 124
Carroll	McKenzie	90.1	145.0	SR 423 (Shiloh Road) – McKenzie	
Carroll	McKenzie	90.7	146.0	US 79 (Highland Drive/SR 76) – Paris	Interchange
Henry	McKenzie	92.7	149.2	SR 140 east (Verdell Store Road) – Como	Western terminus of SR 140
Weakley	Gleason	98.9	159.2	SR 190 (Gleason–Newberry Store Road/Gleason–Como Road)	
Weakley		102.6	165.1	Bridge over the Middle Fork of the Obion River	
Weakley	Dresden	104.3	167.9	SR 217 north (County Maintenance Road)	Southern terminus of SR 217
Weakley	Dresden	107.1	172.4	SR 54 (Morrow Street) – Greenfield, Paris	
Weakley	Dresden	108.0	173.8	SR 89 (Sharon Highway/West Main Street) – Sharon, Palmersville	
Weakley	Dresden	109.8	176.7	SR 239 east (Pikeview Street)	Western terminus of SR 239
Weakley	Martin	108.1	174.0	US 45E south (SR 216 west) / SR 431 north (Main Street) – Milan	Interchange; southern end of US 45E concurrency; southern terminus of SR 431; eastern terminus of SR 216; south end of freeway section
Weakley	Martin	114.4	184.1	Industrial Park Drive	Interchange
Weakley	Martin	117.2	188.6	US 45E Bus. south / US 45E north (North Lindell Street/SR 372) – South Fulton	Interchange; northern end of US 45E concurrency; northern terminus of US 45E Business
Weakley	Martin	118.2	190.2	SR 43 (Skyhawk Parkway) – South Fulton	Interchange
Weakley	Martin	119.8	192.8	SR 431 (University Street) – Martin	Interchange; southbound exit and northbound entrance
Weakley		122.6	197.3	Terrell Road	Interchange
Obion		123.2	198.3	Bridge over the Obion River	
Obion		125.2	201.5	Shaffner Road – Everett-Stewart Regional Airport	Interchange
Obion		126.3	203.3	SR 431 (Reelfoot Avenue) – Union City	Interchange
Obion	Union City	127.0	204.4	Tyson Drive	Interchange
Obion	Union City	128.5	206.8	US 45W south (Nailling Drive/SR 184 south) / SR 214 north (Ken Tenn Highway) – Union City, South Fulton	Interchange; southern end of US 45W concurrency; southern terminus of SR 214; northern terminus of SR 184
Obion	Union City	128.9	207.4	US 45W north / US 51 north (SR 3 north/Jere B Ford Memorial Highway) – South Fulton	Interchange; northern end of US 45W concurrency; southern end of wrong-way US 51/SR 3 concurrency; north end of freeway section; Road continues north as Section Line Road
Obion	Union City	131.0	210.8	SR 21 (North Clover Street)	
Obion	Union City	133.6	215.0	US 51 south (SR 3 south/Everett Boulevard) / SR 5 south (West Main Street) – Troy	Northern end of wrong-way US 51/SR 3 concurrency; southern end of SR 5 concurrency
Obion	Union City	134.4	216.3	SR 690 / Future I-69	Diamond interchange; opened to traffic in February 2024
Obion	Union City	134.8	216.9	SR 5 north (West Main Street) – Woodland Mills	Northern end of SR 5 concurrency
Obion		147.8	237.9	SR 157 north	Southern terminus of SR 157
Obion		156.1	251.2	SR 21 east – Hornbeak	Southern end of SR 21 concurrency
Reelfoot Lake Spillway		157.0	252.7	Hill–Talley Bridge	
Lake	Tiptonville	161.7	260.2	SR 78 south (Carl Perkins Highway) – Dyersburg, Ridgely, Carl Perkins Boyhood Home SR 21 west (Church Street)	Southern end of SR 78 concurrency; northern end of SR 21 concurrency
Lake	Tiptonville	162.2	261.0	SR 78 north – Hickman, KY, Air Park	Northern end of SR 78 concurrency
Lake		165.1	265.7	SR 212 east (Negro Graveyard Road) – Northwest Correctional Complex	Western terminus of SR 212
Kentucky state line		172.8	278.1	Northern terminus; roadway continues as Kentucky Bend Road into the Kentucky Bend	
1.000 mi = 1.609 km; 1.000 km = 0.621 mi: Concurrency terminus; Incomplete access

== Related routes ==
=== Alternate route ===
State Route 22A
- Location: Milledgeville—Lexington
- Length: 26.0 mi (41.8 km)

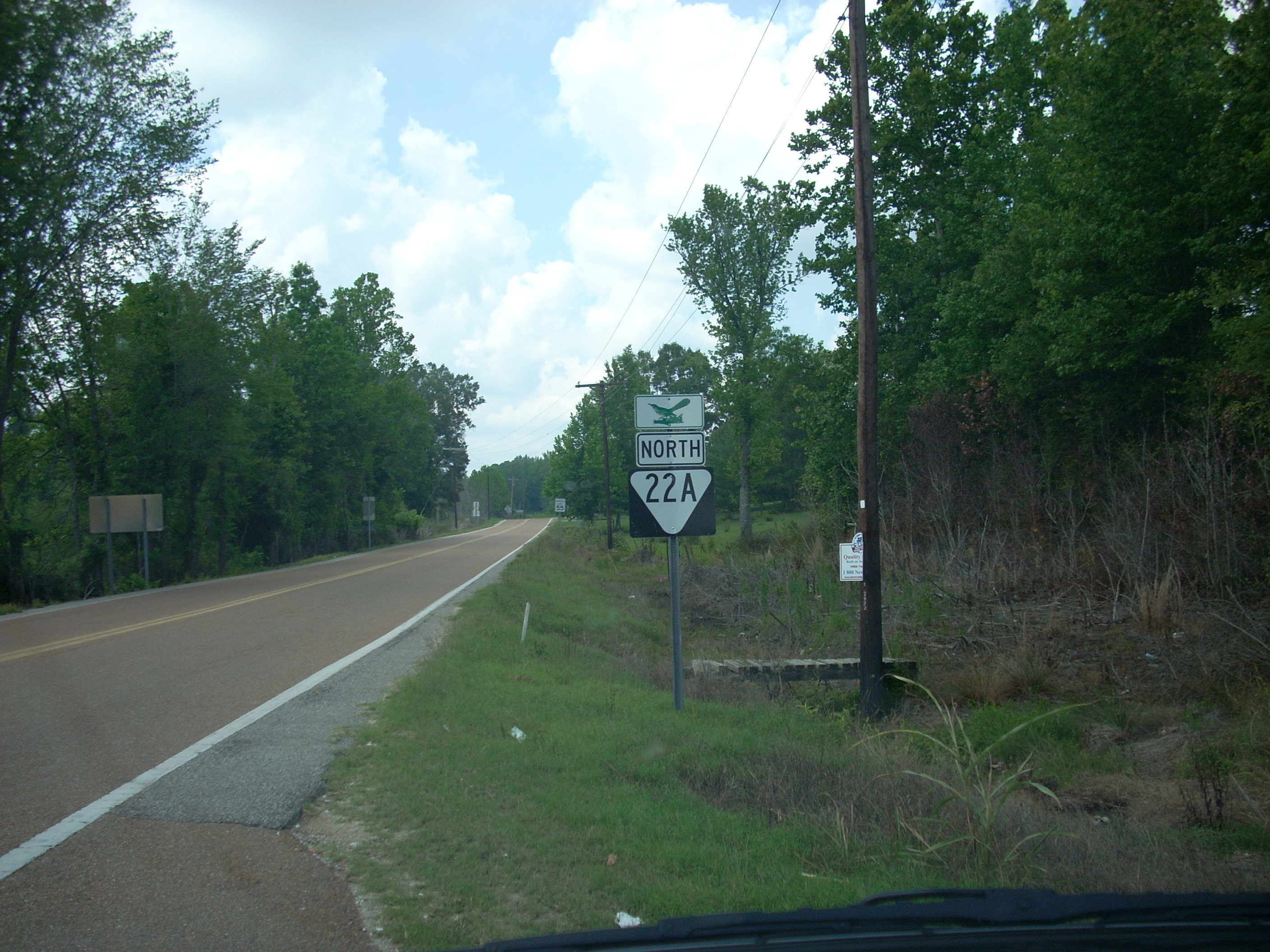
A northbound SR 22A shield at Jacks Creek, July 2007

State Route 22A (SR 22A) is a 26.0-mile-long (41.8 km) alternate route of SR 22 that exists in the west-central part of Tennessee, United States. Its routing takes it through parts of McNairy, Chester, and Henderson counties. SR 22 is one of only three highways in the state to have signed alternate routes that still exist.

SR 22A begins in Milledgeville, at an intersection with the SR 22 mainline and SR 69, in McNairy County. The highway travels due west for one block and curves to the northwest and enters Chester County. Just on the outer city limits of Milledgeville, SR 22A curves to a western routing and enters Enville. There, it intersects the northern terminus of SR 224 (Leapwood Road) and curves to the north-northwest. After a slight jog to the west, it resumes its north-northwesterly routing and leaves town. SR 22A travels through rural areas of the county and enters Jacks Creek, where it intersects SR 100. The alternate route then curves to the north-northeast and enters Henderson County. It eventually enters Lexington, where it formerly intersected the northern terminus of SR 200 which was rerouted following the opening of SR 459 which SR 22A now intersects and curves to a due-east routing and meets its northern terminus, an intersection with the SR 22 mainline in the extreme southern part of the city.

SR 22A is not part of the National Highway System, a system of roadways important to the nation's economy, defense, and mobility.

County	Location	mi	km	Destinations	Notes
McNairy	Milledgeville	0.0	0.0	SR 22 / SR 69 – Adamsville, Savannah, Lexington	Southern terminus
Chester	Enville	4.0	6.4	SR 224 south (Leapwood Road) – Coon Creek Science Center	Northern terminus of SR 224
Chester	Jacks Creek	12.3	19.8	SR 100 – Henderson, Decaturville	
Henderson	Lexington	25.3	40.7	SR 459 (Lexington Bypass)	
Henderson	Lexington	26.0	41.8	SR 22 (South Broad Street)	Northern terminus
1.000 mi = 1.609 km; 1.000 km = 0.621 mi

=== Huntingdon business loop ===
State Route 22 Business
- Location: Huntingdon, Tennessee
- Length: 2.7 mi (4.3 km)

State Route 22 Business (SR 22 Bus.) is a 2.7-mile-long (4.3 km) business route of SR 22 in Huntingdon, Tennessee.

It begins at an intersection with US 70/SR 22/SR 364 south of downtown and heads north into downtown and intersects US 70 Bus./SR 1 in downtown and proceeds northward and comes to an end at SR 22 and US 70A/SR 77 north of downtown.

The entire route is in Huntingdon, Carroll County.

mi	km	Destinations	Notes
0.0	0.0	US 70 / SR 22 (S Veterans Drive/SR 364) – Jackson, McKenzie, Bruceton, Camden	Southern terminus
1.0– 1.1	1.6– 1.8	US 70 Bus. (W/E Main Street/SR 1) – Jackson, Hollow Rock	Roundabout around Carroll County Courthouse
2.7	4.3	US 70A / SR 22 south (N Veterans Drive/SR 77) – Lexington, McLemoresville, Camden, Paris SR 22 north (Paris Street) – McKenzie, Martin	Northern terminus
1.000 mi = 1.609 km; 1.000 km = 0.621 mi

== See also ==
- List of highways numbered 22
