= Tennessee State Route 142 =

Highway in Tennessee

State Route 142
- SR 142 highlighted in red

Route information
- Maintained by TDOT
- Length: 24.59 mi (39.57 km)

Major junctions
- West end: US 45 in Selmer
- SR 22 from Hurley to Shiloh; SR 57 in Southside
- East end: CR 100 at the Mississippi state line near Southside

Location
- Country: United States
- State: Tennessee

Highway system
- Tennessee State Routes; Interstate; US; State
← SR 141	→ SR 143

State Route 142 (SR 142) is a 24.59-mile-long (39.57 km) east-west state highway in West Tennessee.

== Route description ==
SR 142 begins in McNairy County in Selmer at an intersection with US 45/SR 5 south of downtown. It goes east to leave Selmer and pass through first farmland, then wooded areas, to pass through Stantonville, where it has a short concurrency with SR 224. The highway then turns southeast to pass through West Shiloh, where it has an intersection with SR 117, before crossing into Hardin County. SR 142 immediately enters Hurley and comes to an intersection and becomes concurrent with SR 22. They go south along the western edge of Shiloh National Military Park to arrive at Shiloh, where SR 142 splits off and goes south through wooded and hilly areas to pass by Childers Hill to enter Southside and come to an intersection with SR 57. It goes west along SR 57 for a short distance before turning south again through wooded areas to come to an end at the Mississippi state line, where it continues as Alcorn County Road 100 to Mississippi Highway 350 (MS 350), which is less than 1/2 mile (0.80 km) away, and the town of Farmington. The entire route of SR 142 is a two-lane highway.

== Major intersections ==
County	Location	mi	km	Destinations	Notes
McNairy	Selmer	0.0	0.0	US 45 (Mulberry Avenue/SR 5) – Henderson, Downtown, Eastview, Corinth, MS	Western terminus
McNairy	Stantonville			SR 224 north (Gilchrist Stantonville Road) – Leapwood, Enville	Western end of SR 224 concurrency
McNairy	Stantonville			SR 224 south (Michie Pebble Hill Road) – Michie	Eastern end of SR 224 concurrency
McNairy	West Shiloh			SR 117 north (Shiloh Adamsville Road) – Adamsville	Southern terminus of SR 117
Hardin	Hurley			SR 22 north – Crump	Western end of SR 22 concurrency
Hardin	Shiloh			SR 22 south – Michie	Eastern end of SR 22 concurrency
Hardin	Southside			SR 57 east – Counce	Western end of wrong-way SR 57 concurrency; provides access to Pickwick Landing Dam and Pickwick Landing State Park
Hardin	Southside			SR 57 west – Michie	Eastern end of wrong-way SR 57 concurrency
Hardin		24.59	39.57	CR 100 south (Kendrick Road) to MS 350 – Farmington	Mississippi state line; eastern terminus
1.000 mi = 1.609 km; 1.000 km = 0.621 mi: Concurrency terminus
