= Tennessee State Route 199 =

State highway in Tennessee, United States

State Route 199
- Finger–Leapwood Road
- SR 199 highlighted in red

Route information
- Maintained by TDOT
- Length: 12.3 mi (19.8 km)
- Existed: July 1, 1983–present

Major junctions
- West end: US 45 at Finger
- East end: SR 224 at Leapwood

Location
- Country: United States
- State: Tennessee
- Counties: McNairy

Highway system
- Tennessee State Routes; Interstate; US; State
← SR 198	→ SR 200

State Route 199 (abbreviated SR 199) is a secondary state road, located in West Tennessee, and starts at US 45 in the town of Finger in northern McNairy County, and travels southeastward to Leapwood within the same county.

== Route description ==
SR 199 begins in Finger at an intersection with US 45/SR 5. It goes east as a rural 2-lane highway as it passes through town before leaving Finger and turning southeast. It continues to wind its way southeast through rural areas before entering Leapwood, where it comes to an end at an intersection with SR 224.

== Major intersections ==
The entire route is in McNairy County.

Location	mi	km	Destinations	Notes
Finger	0.0	0.0	US 45 (SR 5) – Henderson, Selmer	Western terminus
Leapwood	12.3	19.8	SR 224 (Leapwood Enville Road) – Enville, Adamsville	Eastern terminus
1.000 mi = 1.609 km; 1.000 km = 0.621 mi
