= Mississippi Highway 350 =

Highway in Mississippi

Mississippi Highway 350
- MS 350 highlighted in red

Route information
- Maintained by MDOT
- Length: 12.932 mi (20.812 km)
- Existed: 1981–present

Major junctions
- West end: MS 2 near Corinth
- East end: MS 25 near Counce, TN

Location
- Country: United States
- State: Mississippi
- Counties: Alcorn, Tishomingo

Highway system
- Mississippi State Highway System; Interstate; US; State
← MS 349	→ MS 354

Mississippi Highway 350 (MS 350) is a highway in extreme northern Mississippi. Its western terminus is at MS 2 near Corinth. The road travels near the Tennessee state line to its eastern terminus at MS 25. The route was designated in 1981, and no significant changes have been made since.

== Route description ==
MS 350 is located in northeastern Alcorn and northern Tishomingo counties. In 2012, Mississippi Department of Transportation (MDOT) calculated as many as 2,900 vehicles traveling east of County Road 159 (CR 159), and as few as 1,500 vehicles traveling east of CR 363. All of the road is maintained by MDOT. MS 350 is legally defined in Mississippi Code § 65-3-3.

MS 350 starts at a T-intersection with MS 2 and travels eastward. The route goes through small groups of trees, and turns northeast east of CR 154. The road enters a larger forest and curves back east two miles (3.2 km) later. There, MS 350 was less than 1,000 feet (300 m) from the Tennessee state line. The two-lane road intersects a few roads leading to the state border, such as Kendrick Road (CR 100), which becomes Tennessee State Route 142 (SR 142) at the state line. MS 350 soon enters Tishomingo County, curving around some hills. It remains parallel from the state line, until at CR 375, where it starts to travel southeast. The route temporarily travels east at CR 355, before heading southeast again. MS 350 ends about one mile (1.6 km), at a T-intersection with MS 25.

== History ==
In 1974, a paved road was built from MS 2 to the Alcorn–Tishomingo county line. It was later extended to MS 25 in 1981, and was designated as MS 350 in the same year. No significant changes have been made to the route since.

== Major intersections ==
County	Location	mi	km	Destinations	Notes
Alcorn		0.000	0.000	MS 2 – Corinth, Michie, TN	Western terminus
Alcorn		5.34	8.59	CR 100 (Kendrick Road) to SR 142 - Farmington, Southside, TN	Major county road
Tishomingo		12.932	20.812	MS 25 – Iuka, Counce, TN	Eastern terminus
1.000 mi = 1.609 km; 1.000 km = 0.621 mi
