= Tennessee State Route 459 =

State highway in Tennessee, United States

State Route 459

Route information
- Maintained by TDOT
- Length: 5.2 mi (8.4 km)

Major junctions
- West end: US 412 near Lexington
- SR 200 near Lexington; SR 22A near Lexington
- East end: SR 22 near Lexington

Location
- Country: United States
- State: Tennessee
- Counties: Henderson

Highway system
- Tennessee State Routes; Interstate; US; State
← SR 458	→ SR 460

State Route 459 (SR 459) is a state highway in Henderson County, Tennessee, that serves as a bypass of Lexington. The route connects U.S. Route 412 (US 412) to State Route 22 (SR 22), and opened to traffic in 2023.

== Route description ==
SR 459 is a two-lane road for its entire length, and is commonly referred to as the Lexington Bypass. It begins at an at-grade intersection with US 412 a few miles west of downtown Lexington. Here, westbound traffic on US 412 continues freely onto SR 459, and must make a turn to remain on the former route. The route runs south, and then southeast, before reaching an intersection with the eastern terminus of SR 200 a few miles later. Shifting eastward, the route has an intersection with SR 22A a short distance beyond. A short distance later, SR 459 reaches its eastern terminus at an intersection with SR 22 a few miles south of downtown Lexington.

== History ==
The Lexington Bypass was planned as a continuation of the widening and improvements to US 412 between Lexington and Columbia, which was initiated by the Better Roads Program by Tennessee Governor Lamar Alexander in 1986. Right-of-way plans were finalized in 2007. The contract for the first phase of the bypass between US 412 and SR 22 was awarded on December 23, 2019, and construction began in March 2020. In addition to the construction of the new road, the section of US 412 at the intersection of the bypass was reconfigured to allow direct flow onto the bypass from the westbound lanes. The northern terminus of SR 200 was also truncated from SR 22A to SR 459 and the former northern terminus modified; the former section of SR 200 north of SR 459 was turned over to local control. The road was expected to be complete in October 2022, but experienced many delays, and did not open until June 29, 2023. The route cost approximately $37 million to construct. SR 459 is planned to be extended east to US 412 east of Lexington.

== Major intersections ==
The entire route is in Henderson County.

Location	mi	km	Destinations	Notes
	0.0	0.0	US 412 – Lexington, Jackson	Western terminus
			SR 200	Northern terminus of SR 200
Lexington			SR 22A	
Lexington	5.2	8.4	SR 22 – Lexington, Adamsville	Eastern terminus
1.000 mi = 1.609 km; 1.000 km = 0.621 mi
