= Southside, Tennessee =

Southside, Tennessee may refer to the following places in Tennessee:

- Southside, Hardin County, Tennessee
- Southside, Montgomery County, Tennessee
