= Hurley, Tennessee =

- Unincorporated community
- Location within Tennessee Location within the United States
- Coordinates: 35°08′17″N 88°21′57″W
- Country: United States
- State: Tennessee
- County: Hardin
- Elevation: 456 ft (139 m)
- Time zone: UTC-6 (Central (CST))
  - Summer (DST): UTC-5 (CDT)
- Area code: 731
- GNIS feature ID: 1288772

Hurley is an unincorporated community in Hardin County, Tennessee. Hurley is located near Shiloh National Military Park and is served by Tennessee State Route 22 and Tennessee State Route 142.
