= Clarksburg, Tennessee =

- Town
- Location of Clarksburg in Carroll County, Tennessee.

- Location of Clarksburg in Tennessee
- Coordinates: 35°52′16″N 88°23′42″W
- Country: United States
- State: Tennessee
- County: Carroll

Area
  - Total: 2.49 sq mi (6.45 km^{2})
  - Land: 2.49 sq mi (6.45 km^{2})
  - Water: 0 sq mi (0.00 km^{2})
- Elevation: 522 ft (159 m)

Population (2020)
  - Total: 379
  - Density: 152.1/sq mi (58.73/km^{2})
- Time zone: UTC-6 (Central (CST))
  - Summer (DST): UTC-5 (CDT)
- ZIP code: 38324
- Area code: 731
- FIPS code: 47-15140
- GNIS feature ID: 1305942
- Website: www.clarksburgtn.org

Clarksburg is a town in Carroll County, Tennessee, United States. As of the 2020 census, Clarksburg had a population of 379. Clarksburg has its own high school.

== Geography ==
Clarksburg is in southern Carroll County, along Tennessee State Route 22, which leads north 9 miles (14 km) to Huntingdon, the county seat, and south 6 miles (10 km) to Interstate 40 at Parkers Crossroads. According to the United States Census Bureau, the town has a total area of 2.0 square miles (5.2 km^{2}), all land.

== Demographics ==
Historical population
| Census | Pop. | Note | %± |
|---|---|---|---|
| 1880 | 101 | | — |
| 1890 | 226 | | 123.8% |
| 1970 | 349 | | — |
| 1980 | 400 | | 14.6% |
| 1990 | 321 | | −19.7% |
| 2000 | 285 | | −11.2% |
| 2010 | 393 | | 37.9% |
| 2020 | 379 | | −3.6% |

As of the census of 2000, there were 285 people, 119 households, and 81 families residing in the town. The population density was 241.7 inhabitants per square mile (93.3/km^{2}). There were 132 housing units at an average density of 111.9 per square mile (43.2/km^{2}). The racial makeup of the town was 94.04% White, 2.81% African American, 1.05% Native American, 1.75% Asian, and 0.35% from two or more races. Hispanic or Latino of any race were 1.05% of the population.

There were 119 households, out of which 26.1% had children under the age of 18 living with them, 55.5% were married couples living together, 10.9% had a female householder with no husband present, and 31.1% were non-families. 30.3% of all households were made up of individuals, and 21.8% had someone living alone who was 65 years of age or older. The average household size was 2.39 and the average family size was 2.96.

In the town, the population was spread out, with 20.4% under the age of 18, 7.7% from 18 to 24, 25.3% from 25 to 44, 22.8% from 45 to 64, and 23.9% who were 65 years of age or older. The median age was 44 years. For every 100 females, there were 91.3 males. For every 100 females age 18 and over, there were 78.7 males.

The median income for a household in the town was $31,406, and the median income for a family was $43,750. Males had a median income of $31,250 versus $20,938 for females. The per capita income for the town was $14,458. None of the families and 7.2% of the population were living below the poverty line, including no under eighteens and 21.3% of those over 64.

== Media ==
Radio stations:

- WEIO 100.9 The Farm Home of the Country hits of Today and Yesterday
- WTPR-AM 710 "The Greatest Hits of All Time"

Newspaper:

- The Carroll County News-Leader
