= Crump, Tennessee =

- City
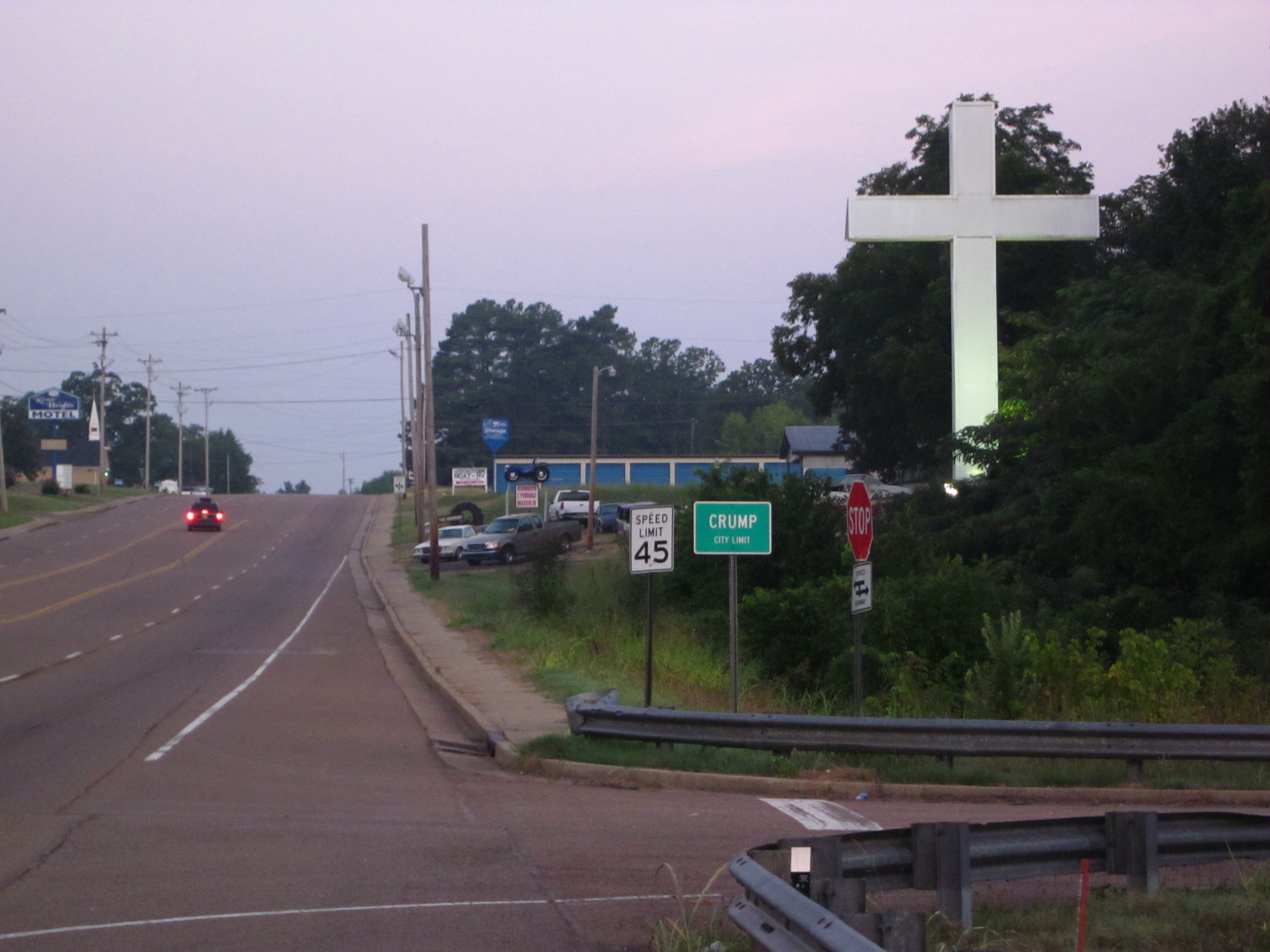

- Location of Crump in Hardin County, Tennessee
- Coordinates: 35°13′57″N 88°20′10″W
- Country: United States
- State: Tennessee
- County: Hardin

Government
  - Mayor: Ricky Tuberville

Area
  - Total: 12.69 sq mi (32.87 km^{2})
  - Land: 12.68 sq mi (32.84 km^{2})
  - Water: 0.012 sq mi (0.03 km^{2})
- Elevation: 456 ft (139 m)

Population (2020)
  - Total: 1,594
  - Density: 125.7/sq mi (48.53/km^{2})
- Time zone: UTC-6 (Central (CST))
  - Summer (DST): UTC-5 (CDT)
- ZIP code: 38327
- Area code: 731
- FIPS code: 47-18620
- GNIS feature ID: 1281766

Crump is a city in Hardin County, Tennessee, United States. The population was 1,428 at the 2010 census, and 1,594 at the 2020 census.

== Geography ==
Crump is located in western Hardin County at 35°13′57″N 88°20′10″W (35.232480, -88.336037). It is bordered to the west by the town Adamsville in McNairy County. U.S. Route 64 crosses Crump, leading east 4 miles (6 km) to Savannah and west the same distance to the center of Adamsville. Tennessee State Route 22 runs south from Crump 5 miles (8 km) to Shiloh National Military Park and 15 miles (24 km) to Michie, and State Route 69 leads north 11 miles (18 km) to Milledgeville.

According to the United States Census Bureau, the city has a total area of 13.4 square miles (34.6 km^{2}), of which 1.5 acres (6,208 m^{2}), or 0.02%, are water. The community sits on high ground on the west side of the Tennessee River.

== Demographics ==
Historical population
Census	Pop.	Note	%±
1990	2,028		—
2000	1,521		−25.0%
2010	1,428		−6.1%
2020	1,594		11.6%

=== 2020 census ===
As of the 2020 census, Crump had a population of 1,594, living in 681 households, including 435 families. The median age was 45.3 years, with 21.2% of residents under the age of 18 and 21.8% aged 65 or older. For every 100 females there were 97.3 males, and for every 100 females age 18 and over there were 97.5 males age 18 and over.

0.0% of residents lived in urban areas, while 100.0% lived in rural areas.

There were 681 households in Crump, of which 27.8% had children under the age of 18 living in them. Of all households, 50.7% were married-couple households, 21.0% were households with a male householder and no spouse or partner present, and 23.8% were households with a female householder and no spouse or partner present. About 29.0% of all households were made up of individuals and 14.3% had someone living alone who was 65 years of age or older.

There were 812 housing units, of which 16.1% were vacant. The homeowner vacancy rate was 2.2% and the rental vacancy rate was 4.3%.

Racial composition as of the 2020 census
Race	Number	Percent
White	1,509	94.7%
Black or African American	12	0.8%
American Indian and Alaska Native	1	0.1%
Asian	9	0.6%
Native Hawaiian and Other Pacific Islander	0	0.0%
Some other race	12	0.8%
Two or more races	51	3.2%
Hispanic or Latino (of any race)	26	1.6%

=== 2000 census ===
As of the census of 2000, there was a population of 1,521, with 639 households and 460 families residing in the city. The population density was 107.9 inhabitants per square mile (41.7/km^{2}). There were 751 housing units at an average density of 53.3 per square mile (20.6/km^{2}). The racial makeup of the city was 97.96% White, 0.20% African American, 0.53% Native American, 0.20% Asian, 0.13% from other races, and 0.99% from two or more races. Hispanic or Latino of any race were 0.92% of the population.

There were 639 households, out of which 27.2% had children under the age of 18 living with them, 60.1% were married couples living together, 8.0% had a female householder with no husband present, and 27.9% were non-families. 25.0% of all households were made up of individuals, and 11.4% had someone living alone who was 65 years of age or older. The average household size was 2.38 and the average family size was 2.83.

In the city, the population was spread out, with 22.5% under the age of 18, 6.7% from 18 to 24, 28.3% from 25 to 44, 26.2% from 45 to 64, and 16.4% who were 65 years of age or older. The median age was 41 years. For every 100 females, there were 98.0 males. For every 100 females age 18 and over, there were 93.3 males.

The median income for a household in the city was $29,333, and the median income for a family was $33,179. Males had a median income of $29,897 versus $19,023 for females. The per capita income for the city was $14,700. About 13.4% of families and 15.8% of the population were below the poverty line, including 20.5% of those under age 18 and 21.7% of those age 65 or over.

== Education ==
The Tennessee College of Applied Technology has a location in Crump.

In the early 20th century a Grade School was built where the Park is today named Crump School. It was likely torn down in the 1980s.

== Notable person(s) ==
- Dewey Phillips, disc jockey
