= Tennessee State Route 460 =

Proposed state highway in Tennessee, US

State Route 460
- Somerville Beltway

Route information
- Maintained by TDOT

Major junctions
- Beltway around Somerville
- US 64; Jernigan Road; SR 76; US 64

Location
- Country: United States
- State: Tennessee
- Counties: Fayette

Highway system
- Tennessee State Routes; Interstate; US; State
← SR 459	→ SR 461

State Route 460 (SR 460) is a proposed beltway around the city of Somerville, in the U.S. state of Tennessee. This roadway is designed as a four-lane limited-access parkway. The southern loop is to be built first. Access to this bypass would be at both ends of US 64, Jernigan Road, and SR 76. Each interchange for US 64 would be built as a partial cloverleaf. The SR 76 interchange would be a single point urban interchange, the second one in Fayette County after the one located at SR 57 and I-269. The Jernigan Road interchange would be an at-grade intersection. According to the website, right of way acquisition is underway and construction should begin in 2013, pending funding.

== See also ==
- List of state routes in Tennessee
