= Dewey Phillips =

American radio personality (1926–1968)

- Born: May 13, 1926; Crump, Tennessee, U.S.
- Died: September 28, 1968 (aged 42)
- Resting place: Crump Cemetery, Crump, Tennessee, U.S.
- Occupations: Radio personality, disc jockey

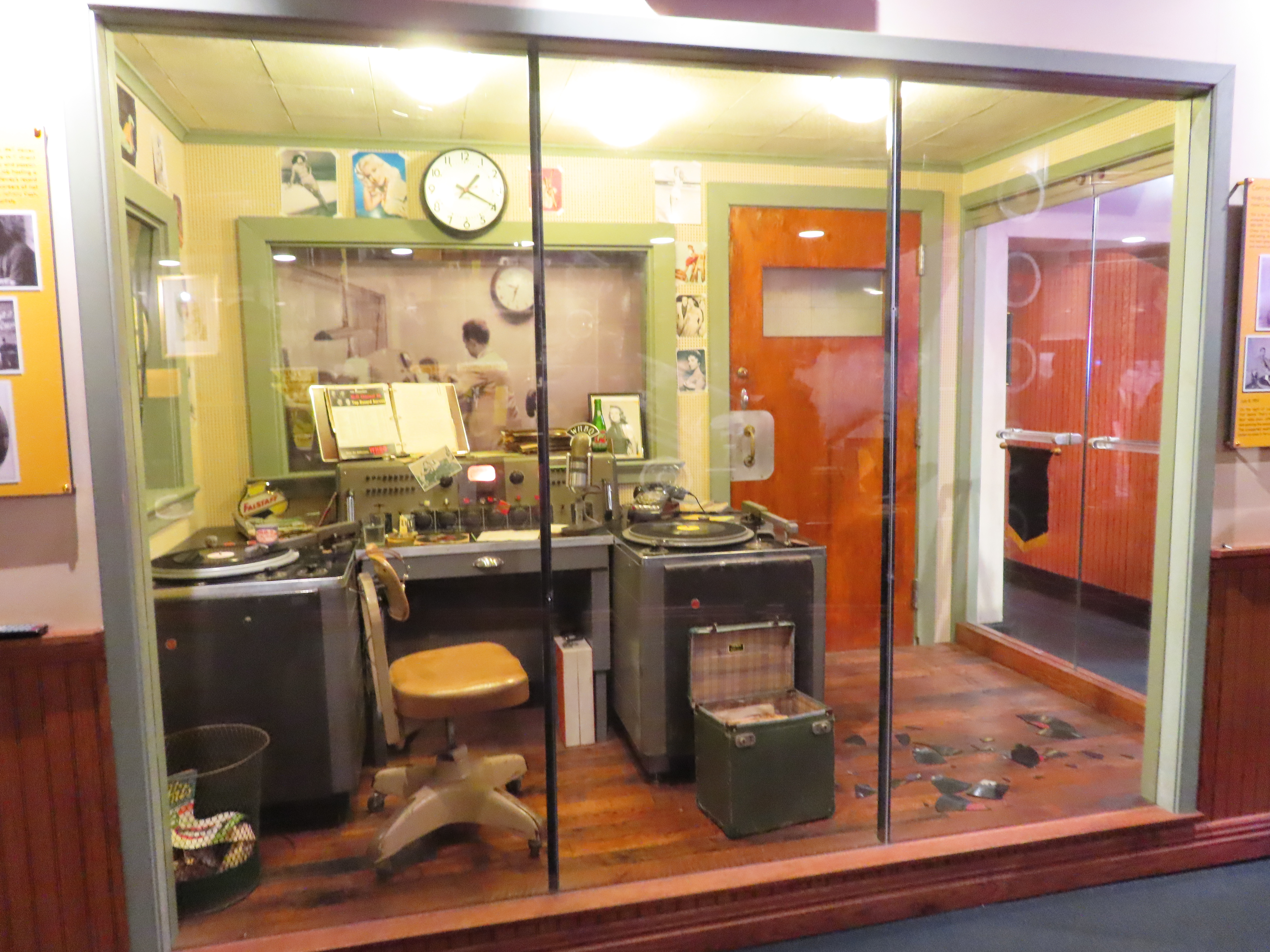
Control Room C from WHBQ Studios originally in Hotel Chisca now in Sun Studios. From this room Dewey Phillips broadcast his radio show "Red, Hot and Blue" in the years 1953-1959.

Dewey Phillips (May 13, 1926 – September 28, 1968) was an American disc jockey based in Memphis, Tennessee, best known as the host of the WHBQ radio show "Red, Hot, and Blue". He was one of rock and roll's pioneering American disc jockeys, helping to popularize the genre in radio airplay along with Cleveland's Alan Freed.

== Early life ==
Phillips was born in Crump, Tennessee, but spent his childhood in Adamsville. After serving in the Army during World War II, seeing action in the Battle of Hürtgen Forest, he moved to Memphis.

== Career ==
Phillips started his radio career in 1949 on WHBQ/560 in Memphis with a special studio at the Gayoso Hotel, initially playing gospel records. His nightly radio program, "Red, Hot & Blue," appeared on the WHBQ schedule for the first time the night of November 3, 1949, in the 10:15 - 11:00 pm slot. In 1953 WHBQ moved to the mezzanine floor of the Chisca Hotel. Phillips was the city's leading radio personality for nine years and was the first to simulcast his "Red, Hot & Blue" show on radio and television. During the 1950s he had 100,000 listeners to his 9pm-midnight slot and he received 3,000 letters a week.

Phillips' on-air persona was a speed-crazed hillbilly, with a frantic delivery and entertaining sense of humor. He also had a keen ear for music the listening public would enjoy, and he aired both black and white music, which was abundant in post-World War II Memphis, a booming river city which attracted large numbers of rural blacks and whites (along with their musical traditions). A famous part of his show was the "Smash Hit", an act where he would smash the record playing over his microphone whenever there was a song he disliked. Dr. W. Herbert Brewster, pastor of East Trigg Baptist Church, was a frequent guest on Dewey's program. He played a great deal of rhythm and blues, country music, boogie-woogie, and jazz as well as Sun Records artists. In 1950, Phillips and his friend Sam Phillips (no relation) decided to launch their own record label. Joe Hill Louis waxed an electric blues single, "Boogie in the Park" (recorded in July 1950 and released the following month). It was the only record released on the Phillips label before Sam founded Sun Records.

In July 1954, he was the first DJ to broadcast the young Elvis Presley's debut record, "That's All Right" / "Blue Moon Of Kentucky" (Sun 209). In fact, he played That's All Right "over and over again". He got Presley to reveal his race in an interview by asking which high school the 19-year-old singer attended (knowing that, because of segregation, his audience would readily know what race attended which schools).

Dewey Phillips was bringing Black Music to segregated Memphis before Alan Freed did the same as Moon Dog in Cleveland. Phillips briefly hosted an afternoon program on WHBQ-TV/13 in the mid-1950s, before Dick Clark took over Philadelphia Bandstand then American Bandstand on WFIL-TV. It mostly consisted of Phillips playing records while he and others clowned around in front of the camera.

Though Phillips was not involved in the payola scandals of the time (as was Freed), he was fired in late 1958 when the station adopted a Top 40 format, phasing out his freeform style. He had Sam Phillips and three other friends, Wink Martindale, T.L. Meade, and Sonny Gilmore to bail him out and keep him steady as work and recognition faded. He spent the last decade of his life working at smaller radio stations, seldom lasting long. The popular musical Memphis is said to be based loosely on Dewey Phillips' life and career, although elements crucial in the career of Phillips' contemporary Freed appear to be intermixed as well.

== Death ==
Phillips died of heart failure at age 42. He is buried in Hardin County, Tennessee, at Crump Cemetery.
