= Shiloh, Hardin County, Tennessee =

Unincorporated community

Shiloh is an unincorporated community in Hardin County, Tennessee.

== Before the Battle of Shiloh/Pittsburgh Landing ==
=== Pittsburgh Landing (North of the Hornets Nest) ===
“Pitts” Tucker founded Pittsburgh Landing, Tennessee, where he built a tavern and so a town and port.

=== Shiloh (South of the Hornets Nest) ===
Shiloh is of somewhat unknown origins but descendants of the Iroquois settled the area and built the Indian mounds in both Pittsburgh Landing/Shiloh and Savannah, Tennessee. Then, during the Westward Expansion Era, Lewis Wicker bought 400 acres of land in Shiloh/Pittsburgh Landing all the way from at least Perry Field to Downtown Shiloh. He later sold most of the land, only keeping Perry Field, Wicker Field, and the Peach Orchard. Lewis built the infamous “Cabin at Shiloh,“ the only cabin that survived the battle. The Church of Shiloh (shiloh was a Hebrew word meaning "place of peace") had been established beforehand and would later be destroyed in the battle.

== The Battle of Shiloh ==
The Battle of Shiloh was some of the bloodiest days of the war with more casualties in two days than the American Revolution, The War of 1812, and The Mexican-American War combined in one battle. In the early morning on April 6, 1862, Gen. Ulysses S. Grant was getting his troops ready in both nearby Savannah, Tennessee and Adamsville, Tennessee. While Gen. Albert Sidney Johnston was getting his troops ready from both Saltillo, Tennessee and Corinth, Mississippi. The battle that ensued for the next two days would be large with the Confederates winning the first day and the Union winning the second and the battle as a whole.

== After the Battle and Recovery (1862-1935) ==
=== 1862-1885 ===
In the following years until 1885, Shiloh/Pittsburgh Landing were in ruins. It was so bad that Shiloh and Pittsburgh Landing had to merge to stay afloat under the one name Shiloh. James Mansfield George moved the Wicker Cabin and that’s why it’s called the ““Manse” George Cabin,” today. By 1885 Alvis Wicker, son of Lewis Wicker bought the cabin from “Manse” and it was the “Wicker Cabin,” until around 1890 when he moved out and the cabin fell in disrepair.

=== Formation of Shiloh National Military Park (1895-1903) ===
By 1895, the “Manse” George Cabin’s roof had fallen in and everything was in disrepair until 1901 when Theodore Roosevelt became President of the U.S. after the assassination of William McKinley. Roosevelt created the first few national parks including Shiloh National Military Park. The cabin was restored by 1933 and Downtown Shiloh was rebuilt with modern buildings and the original entrance to the park along a road that no longer exists, and all new monuments were built and a brick visitor center was built at Pittsburgh Landing.

=== Shiloh Tornado of 1903 ===
In Spring 1903, a EF3 tornado swept away the visitor center and surrounding woods and monuments.

=== 1903-1935 ===
During this period the Confederate mass burials were marked and 2 new cemeteries were built: The Shiloh Church Cemetery and The Shiloh National Military Park/Pittsburgh Landing Cemetery. Also trails were officially marked for the first time and the infamous “Sunken Road” was modeled to look like a 1860s style farm road. The Military Park expanded greatly during this time.

== 1935-Present Day ==
=== 1935-1980 ===
This period was marked with great expansion and another renovation of the cabin. Also during this time the original entrance was destroyed and a new entrance at Perry Field was built.

=== 1980-present ===
The park has expanded much in this time and even by 2021 has at least 5 times more tourist stops than 1990.

== Geography ==
Shiloh is located along Tennessee State Routes 22 and 142.

The Area along with adjacent Savannah, Tennessee was inhabited by the Iroquois, Cherokee, and Chickasaw Indians that built mounds and mingled with the English families such as the Wicker family.
