= Morris Chapel, Tennessee =

Unincorporated community in Tennessee, US

Coordinates: 35°19′26″N 88°21′08″W

Morris Chapel is an unincorporated community in Hardin County, Tennessee, in the southwestern part of the state. Morris Chapel is the hometown of former baseball pitcher Jim Hardin.
