= Jacks Creek, Tennessee =

- Unincorporated community
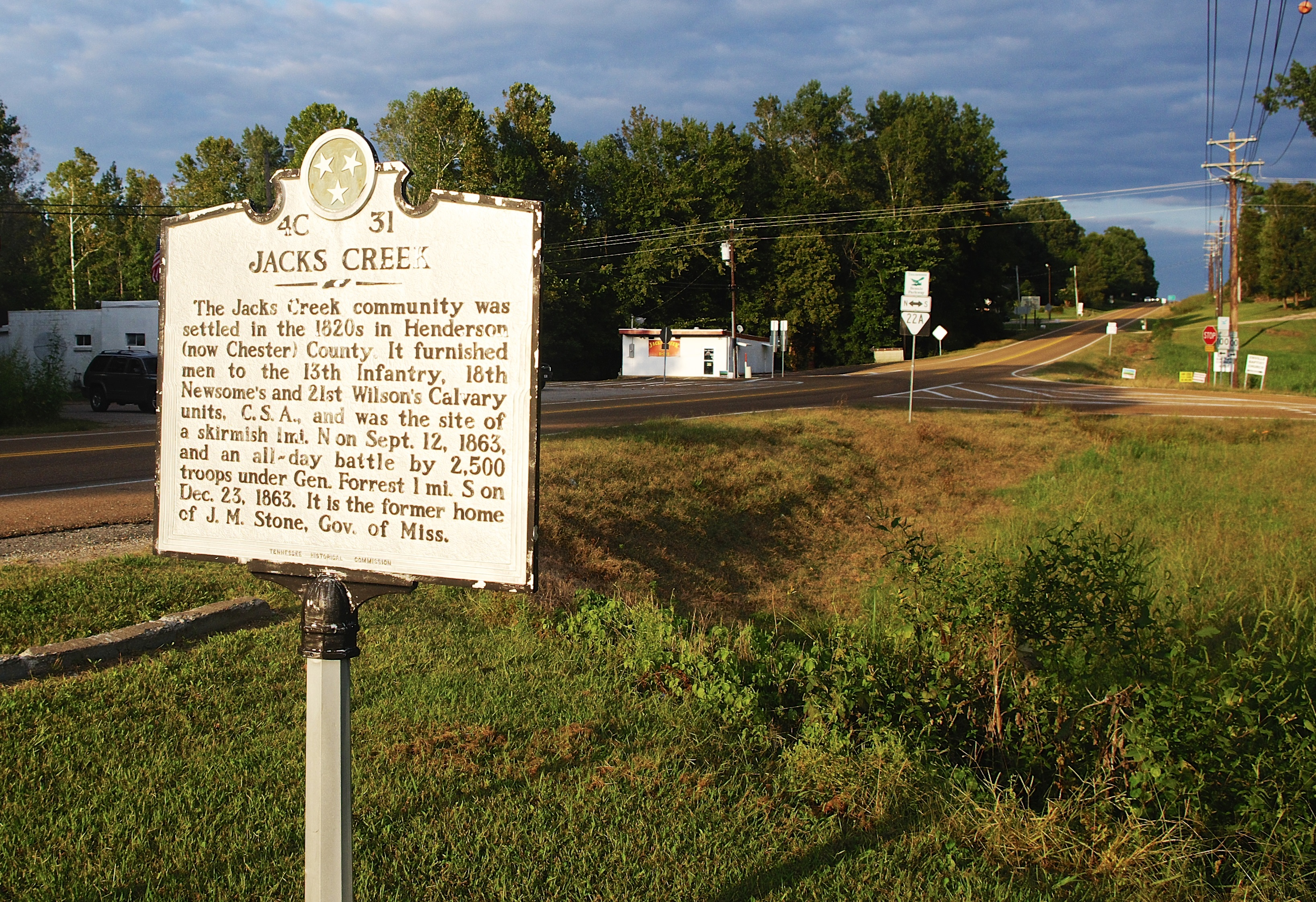
- Historical marker along SR 100

- Location within Tennessee Location within the United States
- Coordinates: 35°28′7″N 88°31′15″W
- Country: United States
- State: Tennessee
- County: Chester

Area
  - Total: 0.99 sq mi (2.56 km^{2})
  - Land: 0.99 sq mi (2.56 km^{2})
  - Water: 0 sq mi (0.00 km^{2})
- Elevation: 463 ft (141 m)

Population (2020)
  - Total: 81
  - Density: 82/sq mi (31.6/km^{2})
- Time zone: UTC-6 (Central (CST))
  - Summer (DST): UTC-5 (CDT)
- ZIP code: 38347
- Area code: 731
- GNIS feature ID: 1289172

Jacks Creek (or Jack's Creek) is an unincorporated community in Chester County, Tennessee, United States.

== History ==
The area was settled in the 1820s. There are multiple legends about the source of the name of the creek running through the community which bears its name. They agree only in that the "Jack" after whom it was named was a young African-American slave boy, who either drowned in the creek, discovered the excellence of its water, or was captured by Indians on its banks.

There were two minor incidents near Jacks Creek during the Civil War: a skirmish one mile north of town, on September 12, 1863; and a one-day battle one mile south of town involving a Confederate unit under Nathan Bedford Forrest and United States Army troops out of Corinth, Mississippi, on December 23, 1863.

In 1937 the community became the site of the Jack's Creek Intermediate Landing Field, an airport on the flight line between Nashville and Memphis that was designated as an emergency landing field. At one time it was the second largest landing field in the United States, with two runways, a beacon light and a radio control tower. During World War II the airfield was used by the U.S. Army Air Force as a practice site.

=== Today ===
Jacks Creek is home to the Jacks Creek Church of Christ and Jacks Creek Elementary School. Jacks Creek also has its own Post Office as well as Jacks Creek Barbecue Restaurant.

== Geography ==
The community is concentrated around the intersection Tennessee State Route 100 and Tennessee State Route 22A, east of Henderson and south of Lexington. It has an elevation of 515 ft. Its zip code is 38347.

== Demographics ==
Historical population
| Census | Pop. | Note | %± |
|---|---|---|---|
| 2020 | 81 | | — |
U.S. Decennial Census

== Notable people ==
- Stephen L. Ross, farmer who served in the Tennessee General Assembly, lived here
- John Marshall Stone made his home here before moving in 1855 to Mississippi, where he eventually became governor of that state
