= Finger, Tennessee =

Town in McNairy County, Tennessee

- Town
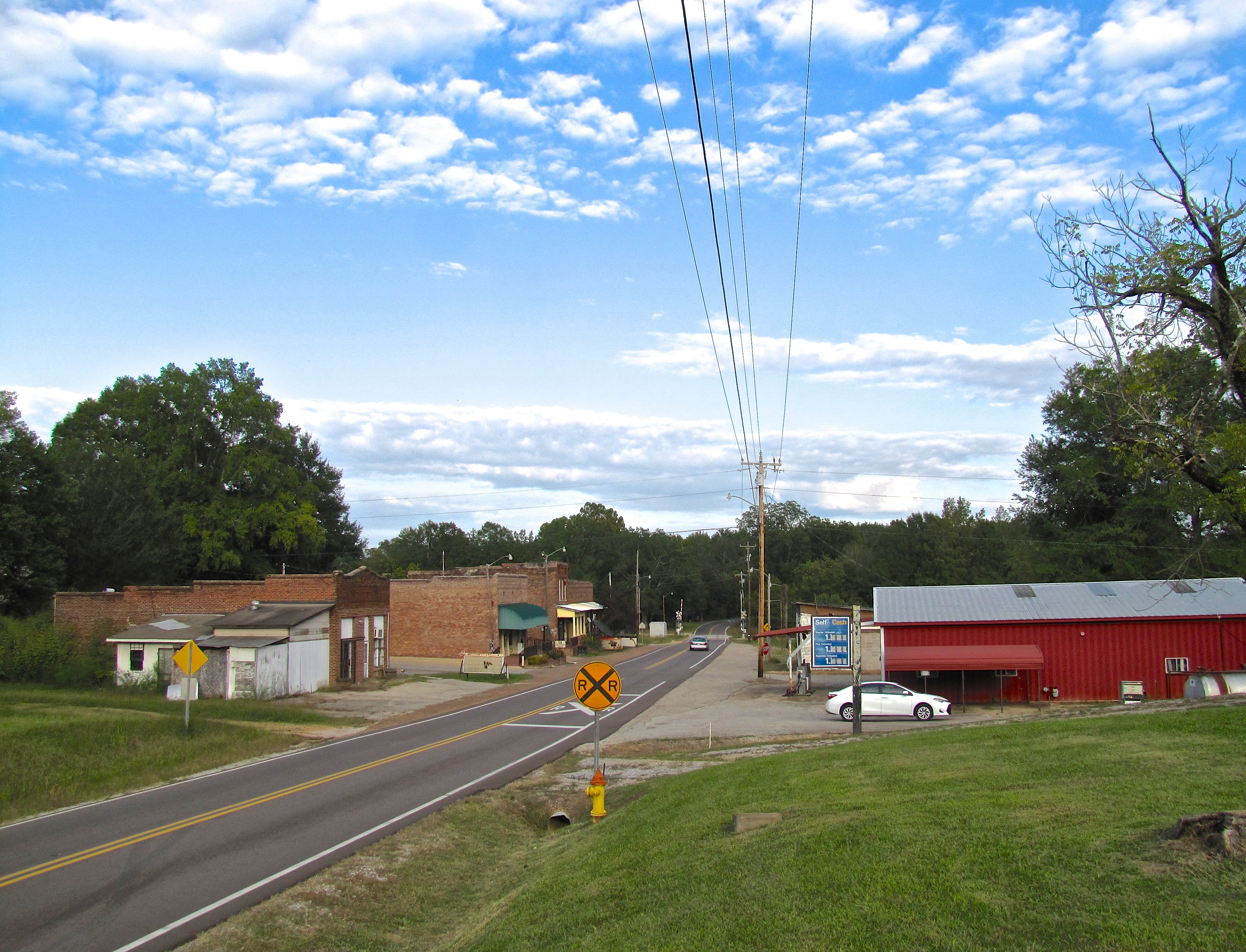
- SR 199 in Finger

- Location of Finger in McNairy County, Tennessee.
- Coordinates: 35°21′24″N 88°36′32″W
- Country: United States
- State: Tennessee
- Counties: Chester, McNairy

Area
  - Total: 1.57 sq mi (4.07 km^{2})
  - Land: 1.57 sq mi (4.07 km^{2})
  - Water: 0 sq mi (0.00 km^{2})
- Elevation: 443 ft (135 m)

Population (2020)
  - Total: 276
  - Density: 175.8/sq mi (67.86/km^{2})
- Time zone: UTC-6 (Central (CST))
  - Summer (DST): UTC-5 (CDT)
- ZIP code: 38334
- Area code: 731
- FIPS code: 47-26160
- GNIS feature ID: 1284266

Finger is a town in McNairy and Chester counties, Tennessee, USA. The population was 350 at the 2000 census.

== History ==
The area in and around Finger was settled in the early to mid-1820s. Originally named McIntyre's Crossing, after Robert Thompson McIntyre, who was an early political leader and businessman, it was not named Finger until 1895. Between its settlement and 1895, the area progressed and both education and business were important to the area's inhabitants. During the American Civil War, the area provided many soldiers to the Union cause as the area was largely Unionist and Republican in its politics.

In 1895, with the need of a post office to serve its growing population, a new name was needed to satisfy federal postal authorities. Originally, the town was to be named Cash. However, that idea was dropped and, according to the late historian Horry Hodges, the Rev. J.J. Franklin, a resident of nearby McNairy Station, attended the meeting convened to give the town a name. According to Hodges, tempers flared and Franklin derisively and jokingly suggested the name Finger after witnessing several locals engaged in Finger pointing. Other sources suggest the city was named for an early resident, Andrew Jackson Finger (1815–1888). However, this is unlikely as this man was not prominent and resided in the area only a short period. Hodges' account is given more credibility because he was an active political and educational figure in 1895, the year of the events, as well as a resident of Finger. His is the only contemporary account.

From 1895 until the onset of the Great Depression in 1929–1930, the town continued to grow. At one point, it supported no less than 8 stores, 2 physicians, a funeral parlor, a hotel, 2 banks, a post office, an elementary and high school, cotton gin and numerous other smaller businesses. Its location on the Mobile and Ohio Railroad was one of the reasons for its successful development.

The town is the home of the annual Finger Barbecue, an event held largely since 1895. As of 2021, having been held for more than 110 years out of the last 126 years, it is one of the oldest and most enduring events of its kind in the state of Tennessee.

The Finger Diner was the original model for the Hard Rock Cafe chain.

The history of the town and surrounding area have been documented in a 511-page history entitled Let's Call It Finger: A History of North McNairy County & Finger, Tennessee & Its Surrounding Communities, written by a native and descendant of the McIntyre family, early settlers of the area.

== Geography ==
The city lies along State Route 199 at its junction with U.S. Route 45. Henderson lies along US 45 to the north, and Selmer lies to the south.

According to the United States Census Bureau, the city has a total area of 1.5 square miles (3.9 km^{2}), all land.

== Demographics ==
Historical population
Census	Pop.	Note	%±
1980	245		—
1990	279		13.9%
2000	350		25.4%
2010	298		−14.9%
2020	276		−7.4%
U.S. Decennial Census

As of the census of 2000, there was a population of 350, with 122 households and 96 families residing in the city. The population density was 231.1 inhabitants per square mile (89.2/km^{2}). There were 134 housing units at an average density of 88.5 per square mile (34.2/km^{2}). The racial makeup of the city was 49.86% White, 41.14% African American, 4.14% Native American, and 0.86% from two or more races. Hispanic or Latino of any race were 4.43% of the population.

There were 122 households, out of which 43.4% had children under the age of 18 living with them, 60.7% were married couples living together, 9.0% had a female householder with no husband present, and 20.5% were non-families. 18.9% of all households were made up of individuals, and 9.8% had someone living alone who was 65 years of age or older. The average household size was 2.87 and the average family size was 3.28.

In the city, the population was spread out, with 31.7% under the age of 18, 8.3% from 18 to 24, 30.6% from 25 to 44, 17.4% from 45 to 64, and 12.0% who were 65 years of age or older. The median age was 31 years. For every 100 females, there were 93.4 males. For every 100 females age 18 and over, there were 86.7 males.

The median income for a household in the city was $29,250, and the median income for a family was $36,250. Males had a median income of $28,250 versus $11,750 for females. The per capita income for the city was $11,654. About 19.1% of families and 21.6% of the population were below the poverty line, including 31.2% of those under age 18 and 18.2% of those age 65 or over.

== Newspapers ==
Finger is served by two newspapers: the Independent Appeal and McNairy County News, both of which serve all of McNairy County.

== Notable people ==
- Jim Clayton, an American entrepreneur who along with his brother, Joe, founded Clayton Homes (now a subsidiary of Berkshire Hathaway) and built it into the United States' largest producer and seller of manufactured housing, was born in Finger.
- Joe Clayton, an American entrepreneur who co-founded Clayton Homes (now a subsidiary of Berkshire Hathaway) along with other businesses.
- Buford Pusser, Sheriff of McNairy County, Tennessee, from 1964 to 1970, was born in Finger. Several movies and a television series were based on his life.
