= Slugburger =

Southern United States food

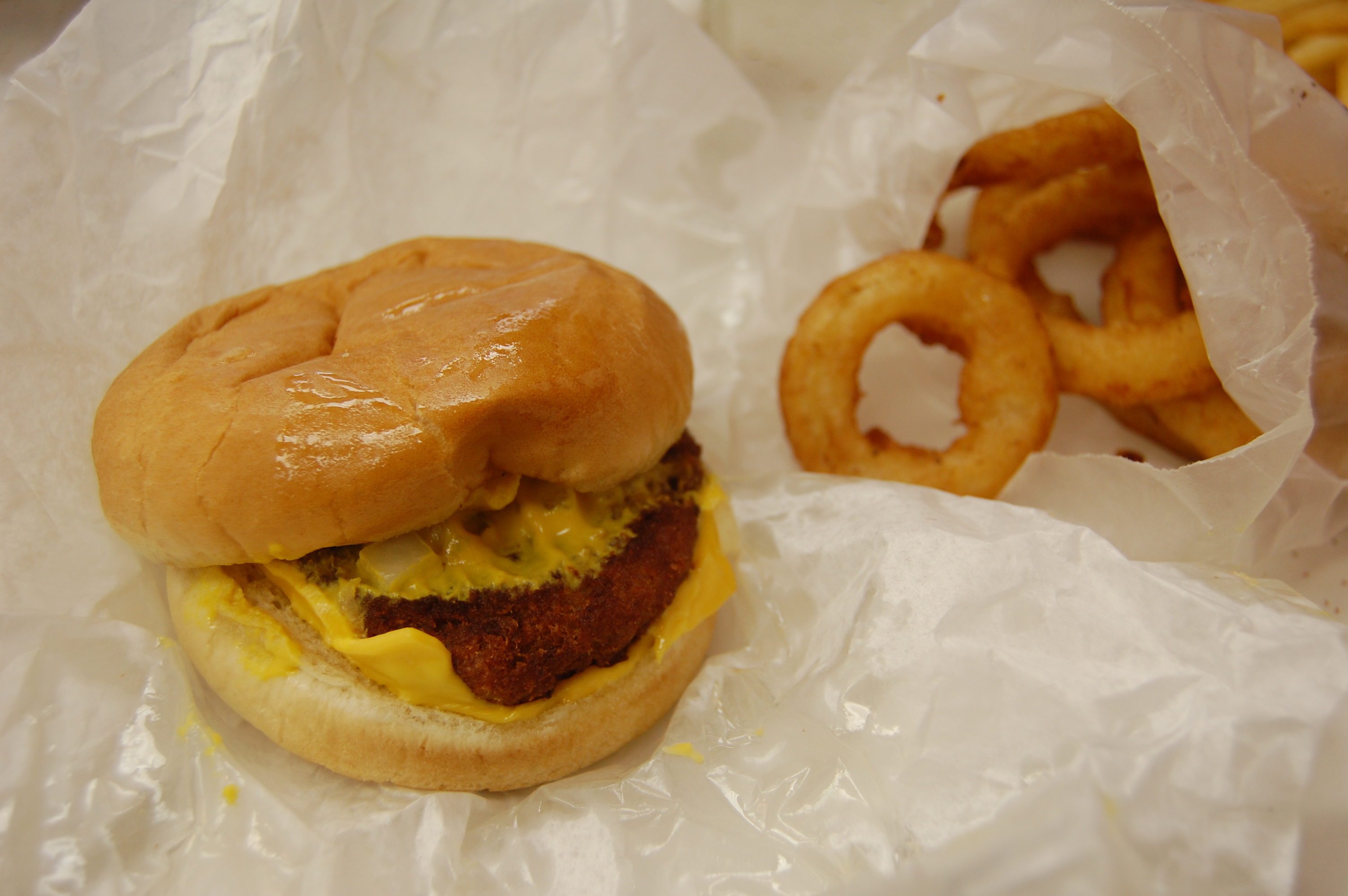
- A slugburger with onion rings
- Course: Main
- Place of origin: United States
- Region or state: Southeast
- Created by: John Weeks
- Main ingredients: Beef or pork with an inexpensive meat extender such as soybeans

A slugburger (originally Weeksburger) is a sandwich with a deep-fried patty containing beef or pork and a plant-based filler ingredient such as potato or cornmeal. It is a traditional Southern food originating in northeast Mississippi.

== History ==
John Weeks brought his hamburger recipe from Chicago to Corinth, Mississippi, in 1917. Weeks had local butchers grind his hamburger meat to specification, asking them to include potato flakes and flour. These small hamburgers were originally called Weeksburgers. Sometime before 1950, soy grits replaced the potato and flour. According to town legend, the term "slugburger" comes from the slang term for a metal disk the size of a nickel that would work in vending machines; the original price of the burger was a nickel.

At one time, five of the Weeks brothers were selling Weeksburgers in the south end of Corinth. As well as running twelve other hamburger stands, one of the brothers ran stands out of old trolley cars after the Second World War, including one in Booneville.

The burger is commonly known in Northeast Mississippi. Meatpackers in the area supply a premade mixture using ground pork rather than beef and using soy flour as the extender.

== Slugburger Festival ==
The city of Corinth has held an annual Slugburger Festival in its downtown area in July since 1988. It includes an eating contest, which has been won by competitive eaters Matt Stonie and Joey Chestnut.

- List of hamburgers
- Slider sandwich
