= Parkers Crossroads, Tennessee =

- City
- Location in Henderson County, Tennessee
- Coordinates: 35°46′54″N 88°23′22″W
- Country: United States
- State: Tennessee
- County: Henderson
- Incorporated: June 2, 1981

Area
  - Total: 3.79 sq mi (9.81 km^{2})
  - Land: 3.79 sq mi (9.81 km^{2})
  - Water: 0 sq mi (0.00 km^{2})
- Elevation: 522 ft (159 m)

Population (2020)
  - Total: 284
  - Density: 75.0/sq mi (28.96/km^{2})
- Time zone: UTC-6 (Central (CST))
  - Summer (DST): UTC-5 (CDT)
- ZIP code: 38388
- FIPS code: 47-56870
- GNIS feature ID: 1652486
- Website: www.parkerscrossroad.org

Parkers Crossroads is a city in Henderson County, Tennessee, United States. The population was 330 as of the 2010 census, up from 241 at the 2000 census.

== Geography ==
Parkers Crossroads is located in northern Henderson County at 35°46′54″N 88°23′22″W (35.781655, -88.389434). It is bordered to the north by the town of Clarksburg in Carroll County. Interstate 40 crosses Tennessee State Route 22 at Exit 108 just south of the original crossroads. I-40 leads east 102 miles (164 km) to Nashville and west 110 miles (180 km) to Memphis, while SR 22 leads north 16 miles (26 km) to Huntingdon and south 9 miles (14 km) to Lexington, the Henderson county seat.

According to the United States Census Bureau, Parkers Crossroads has a total area of 3.7 square miles (9.6 km^{2}), all land.

== Demographics ==
Historical population
Census	Pop.	Note	%±
1990	161		—
2000	241		49.7%
2010	330		36.9%
2020	284		−13.9%

As of the census of 2000, there was a population of 241, with 107 households and 80 families residing in the city. The population density was 164.8 inhabitants per square mile (63.6/km^{2}). There were 111 housing units at an average density of 75.9 per square mile (29.3/km^{2}). The racial makeup of the city was 80.91% White, 14.52% African American, 3.32% from other races, and 1.24% from two or more races. Hispanic or Latino of any race were 1.24% of the population.

There were 107 households, out of which 21.5% had children under the age of 18 living with them, 63.6% were married couples living together, 9.3% had a female householder with no husband present, and 25.2% were non-families. 24.3% of all households were made up of individuals, and 8.4% had someone living alone who was 65 years of age or older. The average household size was 2.25 and the average family size was 2.61.

In the city, the population was spread out, with 17.0% under the age of 18, 7.1% from 18 to 24, 30.7% from 25 to 44, 28.6% from 45 to 64, and 16.6% who were 65 years of age or older. The median age was 42 years. For every 100 females, there were 104.2 males. For every 100 females age 18 and over, there were 108.3 males.

The median income for a household in the city was $24,792, and the median income for a family was $35,625. Males had a median income of $36,875 versus $21,250 for females. The per capita income for the city was $17,303. About 19.0% of families and 18.7% of the population were below the poverty line, including 12.5% of those under the age of eighteen and 21.6% of those 65 or over.

== Transportation ==
Parkers Crossroads is located off Interstate 40 exit 108. Tennessee State Route 22 is the main road through the city.

== See also ==
- Battle of Parker's Cross Roads

== Notable person ==
- Steve McDaniel, former member of the Tennessee House of Representatives
