= Farmington, Mississippi =

- Town
- Flag

- Location of Farmington, Mississippi

- Location in Mississippi Farmington, Mississippi (the United States)
- Coordinates: 34°55′21″N 88°26′35″W
- Country: United States
- State: Mississippi
- County: Alcorn

Area
  - Total: 6.39 sq mi (16.56 km^{2})
  - Land: 6.38 sq mi (16.53 km^{2})
  - Water: 0.015 sq mi (0.04 km^{2})
- Elevation: 528 ft (161 m)

Population (2020)
  - Total: 2,055
  - Density: 322.1/sq mi (124.35/km^{2})
- Time zone: UTC-6 (Central (CST))
  - Summer (DST): UTC-5 (CDT)
- ZIP code: 38834
- Area code: 662
- FIPS code: 28-24420
- GNIS feature ID: 2406492

Farmington is a town in Alcorn County, Mississippi. The population was 2,055 at the 2020 census.

== History ==
Farmington was described as "a flourishing place" prior to 1855. That year, two railroads being constructed—the Mobile and Ohio and Memphis and Charleston—bypassed the town by about 4 miles (6.4 km), and Farmington began to decline. "As late as the beginning of the war, the old town had a large population", as well as a post office and several houses. When the Union Army marched on Corinth, Farmington was "completely destroyed"; the Union Army "tearing down the houses to make breastworks, flooring for tents, etc.".

== Geography ==
According to the United States Census Bureau, the town has a total area of 6.4 square miles (16.6 km^{2}), of which 0.015 square miles (0.04 km^{2}), or 0.26%, is water.

=== Communities near Farmington ===
- Burnsville - 9.94 miles (16.00 km)
- Corinth - 3.97 miles (6.39 km)
- Guys, Tennessee - 9.41 miles (15.14 km)
- Michie, Tennessee - 8.76 miles (14.10 km)
- Ramer, Tennessee - 13.61 miles (21.90 km)

== Demographics ==
Historical population
Census	Pop.	Note	%±
2000	1,810		—
2010	2,186		20.8%
2020	2,055		−6.0%
U.S. Decennial Census

=== 2020 census ===
As of the 2020 census, Farmington had a population of 2,055. The median age was 42.2 years. 21.9% of residents were under the age of 18 and 20.1% of residents were 65 years of age or older. For every 100 females there were 96.5 males, and for every 100 females age 18 and over there were 95.8 males age 18 and over.

2.5% of residents lived in urban areas, while 97.5% lived in rural areas.

There were 840 households in Farmington, of which 31.1% had children under the age of 18 living in them. Of all households, 46.7% were married-couple households, 20.2% were households with a male householder and no spouse or partner present, and 26.5% were households with a female householder and no spouse or partner present. About 27.9% of all households were made up of individuals and 13.2% had someone living alone who was 65 years of age or older.

There were 924 housing units, of which 9.1% were vacant. The homeowner vacancy rate was 1.5% and the rental vacancy rate was 9.8%.

Racial composition as of the 2020 census
Race	Number	Percent
White	1,845	89.8%
Black or African American	82	4.0%
American Indian and Alaska Native	3	0.1%
Asian	15	0.7%
Native Hawaiian and Other Pacific Islander	2	0.1%
Some other race	12	0.6%
Two or more races	96	4.7%
Hispanic or Latino (of any race)	35	1.7%

=== 2000 census ===
As of the census of 2000, there were 1,810 people, 685 households, and 537 families residing in the town. The population density was 484.2 inhabitants per square mile (187.0/km^{2}). There were 746 housing units at an average density of 199.6 per square mile (77.1/km^{2}). The racial makeup of the town was 97.85% White, 1.10% African American, 0.06% Native American, 0.55% Asian, 0.17% from other races, and 0.28% from two or more races. Hispanic or Latino of any race were 0.33% of the population.

There were 685 households, out of which 41.6% had children under the age of 18 living with them, 63.4% were married couples living together, 11.1% had a female householder with no husband present, and 21.6% were non-families. 19.6% of all households were made up of individuals, and 4.7% had someone living alone who was 65 years of age or older. The average household size was 2.64 and the average family size was 3.03.

In the town, the population was spread out, with 28.3% under the age of 18, 9.0% from 18 to 24, 30.3% from 25 to 44, 23.8% from 45 to 64, and 8.6% who were 65 years of age or older. The median age was 34 years. For every 100 females, there were 100.7 males. For every 100 females age 18 and over, there were 96.7 males.

The median income for a household in the town was $37,074, and the median income for a family was $41,696. Males had a median income of $29,531 versus $21,346 for females. The per capita income for the town was $16,327. About 4.1% of families and 4.9% of the population were below the poverty line, including 4.3% of those under age 18 and 9.2% of those age 65 or over.

== Education ==
The town of Farmington is served by the Alcorn School District.

== See also ==
- Siege of Corinth (First Battle of Corinth), American Civil War Battle
- Second Battle of Corinth
- Battle of Farmington, Mississippi
