= Southside, Hardin County, Tennessee =

- Unincorporated community
- Location within Tennessee Location within the United States
- Coordinates: 35°02′44″N 88°21′06″W
- Country: United States
- State: Tennessee
- County: Hardin
- Elevation: 541 ft (165 m)
- Time zone: UTC-6 (Central (CST))
  - Summer (DST): UTC-5 (CDT)
- Area code: 731
- GNIS feature ID: 1314314

Southside is an unincorporated community in Hardin County, Tennessee, United States. Southside is located at the intersection of Tennessee State Route 57 and Tennessee State Route 142 near the Mississippi border.
