= Stantonville, Tennessee =

- Town
- Location of Stantonville in McNairy County, Tennessee.
- Coordinates: 35°9′29″N 88°25′42″W
- Country: United States
- State: Tennessee
- County: McNairy

Area
  - Total: 1.13 sq mi (2.92 km^{2})
  - Land: 1.13 sq mi (2.92 km^{2})
  - Water: 0 sq mi (0.00 km^{2})
- Elevation: 482 ft (147 m)

Population (2020)
  - Total: 335
  - Density: 297/sq mi (114.7/km^{2})
- Time zone: UTC-6 (Central (CST))
  - Summer (DST): UTC-5 (CDT)
- ZIP code: 38379
- Area code: 731
- FIPS code: 47-70840
- GNIS feature ID: 1652466

Stantonville is a town in McNairy County, Tennessee. As of the 2020 census, Stantonville had a population of 335.

== Geography ==
Stantonville is located at 35°9′29″N 88°25′42″W (35.158143, -88.428354).

According to the United States Census Bureau, the town has a total area of 1.1 square miles (2.8 km^{2}), all land.

== Newspaper ==
Stantonville's newspaper is the Independent Appeal, which serves all of McNairy County. It was founded in 1902. It is located at 111 N. 2nd St. in Selmer.

== Demographics ==
Historical population
Census	Pop.	Note	%±
1970	296		—
1980	271		−8.4%
1990	264		−2.6%
2000	312		18.2%
2010	283		−9.3%
2020	335		18.4%

As of the census of 2000, there were 312 people, 122 households, and 89 families residing in the town. The population density was 282.0 inhabitants per square mile (108.9/km^{2}). There were 137 housing units at an average density of 123.8 per square mile (47.8/km^{2}). The racial makeup of the town was 97.44% White, 0.96% from other races, and 1.60% from two or more races. Hispanic or Latino of any race were 1.60% of the population.

There were 122 households, out of which 27.0% had children under the age of 18 living with them, 57.4% were married couples living together, 11.5% had a female householder with no husband present, and 27.0% were non-families. 23.8% of all households were made up of individuals, and 13.9% had someone living alone who was 65 years of age or older. The average household size was 2.56 and the average family size was 2.96.

In the town, the population was spread out, with 21.5% under the age of 18, 11.2% from 18 to 24, 22.8% from 25 to 44, 26.6% from 45 to 64, and 17.9% who were 65 years of age or older. The median age was 40 years. For every 100 females, there were 103.9 males. For every 100 females age 18 and over, there were 92.9 males.

The median income for a household in the town was $33,047, and the median income for a family was $34,432. Males had a median income of $21,607 versus $15,469 for females. The per capita income for the town was $13,378. About 3.3% of families and 4.7% of the population were below the poverty line, including 7.8% of those under age 18 and 5.9% of those age 65 or over.
