= Milledgeville, Tennessee =

- Town
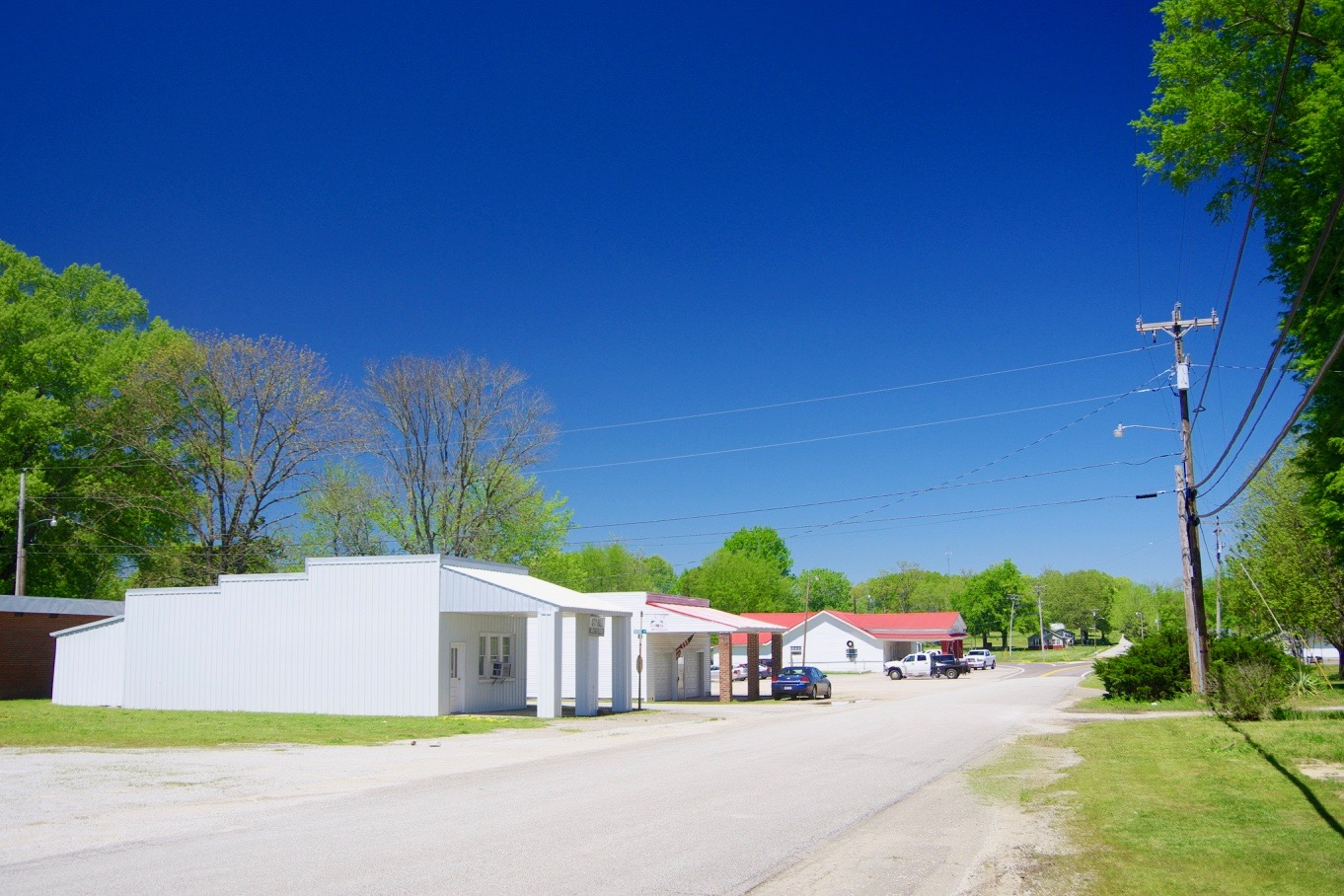
- Main Street

- Location of Milledgeville in McNairy County, Tennessee.
- Coordinates: 35°22′38″N 88°21′52″W
- Country: United States
- State: Tennessee
- Counties: McNairy, Chester, Hardin
- Incorporated: 1983

Area
  - Total: 1.61 sq mi (4.16 km^{2})
  - Land: 1.61 sq mi (4.16 km^{2})
  - Water: 0 sq mi (0.00 km^{2})
- Elevation: 420 ft (128 m)

Population (2020)
  - Total: 271
  - Density: 169/sq mi (65.1/km^{2})
- Time zone: UTC-6 (Central (CST))
  - Summer (DST): UTC-5 (CDT)
- ZIP code: 38359
- Area code: 731
- FIPS code: 47-48920
- GNIS feature ID: 1647832

Milledgeville is a town in Chester, Hardin, and McNairy counties, Tennessee, United States. As of the 2020 census, Milledgeville had a population of 271.

== Geography ==
Milledgeville is located at 35°22′38″N 88°21′52″W (35.377337, -88.364339). The largest portion of the town lies in McNairy County, with portions extending into Chester and Hardin Counties. In the 2000 census, 130 of the town's 287 residents (45.3%) lived in McNairy County, 83 (28.9%) in Chester County, and 74 (25.8%) in Hardin County.

According to the United States Census Bureau, the town has a total area of 1.6 square miles (4.2 km^{2}), all land.

== Demographics ==
Historical population
Census	Pop.	Note	%±
1970	349		—
1980	392		12.3%
1990	279		−28.8%
2000	287		2.9%
2010	265		−7.7%
2020	271		2.3%

As of the census of 2000, there were 287 people, 135 households, and 95 families residing in the town. The population density was 178.1 inhabitants per square mile (68.8/km^{2}). There were 154 housing units at an average density of 95.5 per square mile (36.9/km^{2}). The racial makeup of the town was 98.61% White, 0.70% Native American, and 0.70% from two or more races.

There were 135 households, out of which 16.3% had children under the age of 18 living with them, 59.3% were married couples living together, 8.1% had a female householder with no husband present, and 29.6% were non-families. 26.7% of all households were made up of individuals, and 12.6% had someone living alone who was 65 years of age or older. The average household size was 2.13 and the average family size was 2.55.

In the town, the population was spread out, with 14.6% under the age of 18, 8.0% from 18 to 24, 20.9% from 25 to 44, 27.9% from 45 to 64, and 28.6% who were 65 years of age or older. The median age was 50 years. For every 100 females, there were 85.2 males. For every 100 females age 18 and over, there were 88.5 males.

The median income for a household in the town was $29,583, and the median income for a family was $30,833. Males had a median income of $31,000 versus $23,750 for females. The per capita income for the town was $14,688. About 16.0% of families and 22.3% of the population were below the poverty line, including 51.9% of those under the age of eighteen and 9.3% of those 65 or over.

== Notable person ==
- N. B. Hardeman, educator and gospel preacher.
