= Enville, Tennessee =

- Town
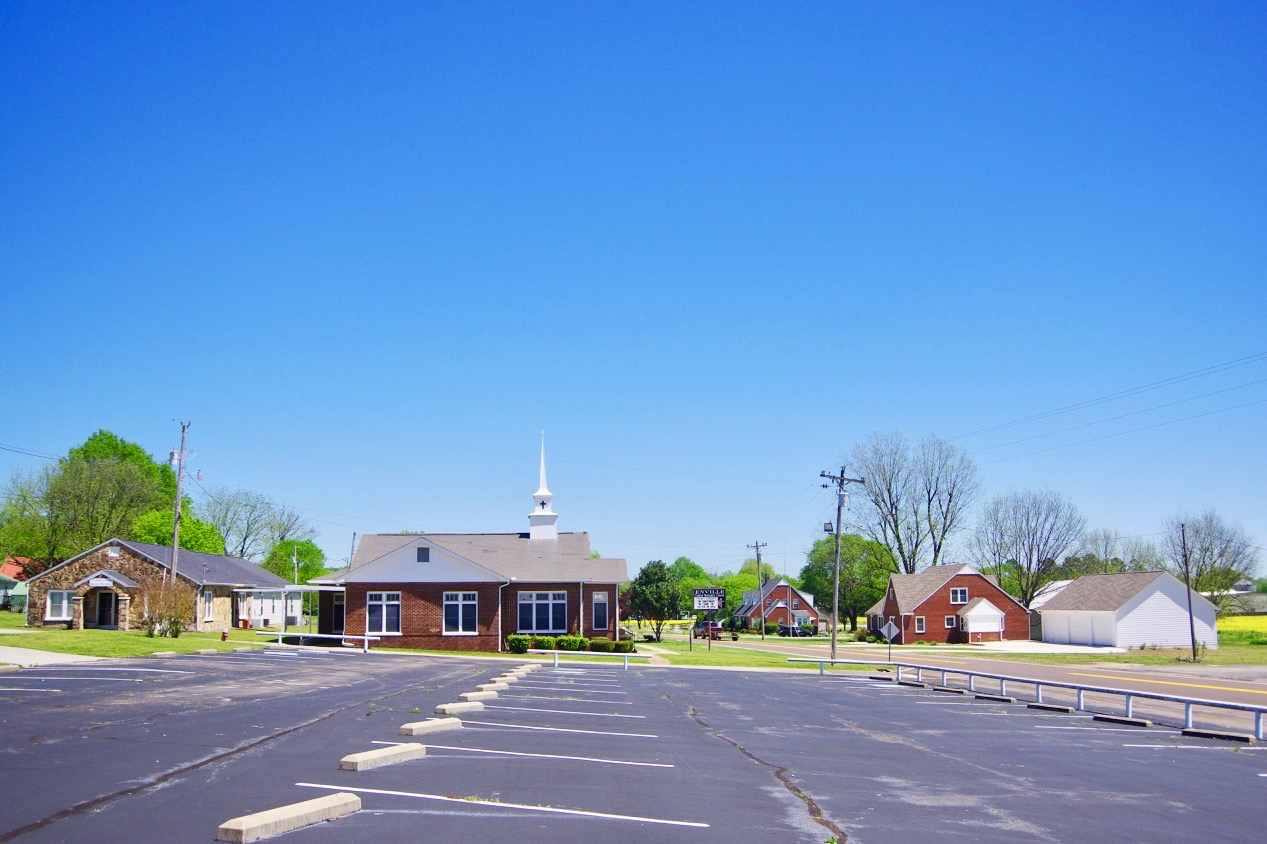
- Enville

- Location of Enville in McNairy County, Tennessee.
- Coordinates: 35°23′17″N 88°25′12″W
- Country: United States
- State: Tennessee
- Counties: Chester, McNairy

Area
  - Total: 1.44 sq mi (3.74 km^{2})
  - Land: 1.44 sq mi (3.74 km^{2})
  - Water: 0 sq mi (0.00 km^{2})
- Elevation: 420 ft (128 m)

Population (2020)
  - Total: 188
  - Density: 130.1/sq mi (50.23/km^{2})
- Time zone: UTC-6 (Central (CST))
  - Summer (DST): UTC-5 (CDT)
- ZIP code: 38332
- Area code: 731
- FIPS code: 47-24240
- GNIS feature ID: 1283824

Enville is a town in Chester and McNairy counties, Tennessee, USA. As of the 2020 census, Enville had a population of 188.

== Geography ==
Enville is located at 35°23′17″N 88°25′12″W (35.388026, -88.420032).

According to the United States Census Bureau, the town has a total area of 1.5 square miles (3.8 km^{2}), all land.

== Demographics ==
Historical population
| Census | Pop. | Note | %± |
|---|---|---|---|
| 1960 | 250 | | — |
| 1970 | 228 | | −8.8% |
| 1980 | 287 | | 25.9% |
| 1990 | 211 | | −26.5% |
| 2000 | 230 | | 9.0% |
| 2010 | 189 | | −17.8% |
| 2020 | 188 | | −0.5% |

At the 2000 census, there were 230 people, 95 households and 70 families residing in the town. The population density was 157.9 per square mile (61.0/km^{2}). There were 115 housing units at an average density of 79.0 per square mile (30.5/km^{2}). The racial make-up of the town was 97.39% White and 2.61% African American. Hispanic or Latino of any race were 1.30% of the population.

There were 95 households, of which 25.3% had children under the age of 18 living with them, 61.1% were married couples living together, 7.4% had a female householder with no husband present and 25.3% were non-families. 22.1% of all households were made up of individuals, and 16.8% had someone living alone who was 65 years of age or older. The average household size was 2.42 and the average family size was 2.77.

20.9% of the population were under the age of 18, 5.7% from 18 to 24, 25.7% from 25 to 44, 23.5% from 45 to 64 and 24.3% were 65 years of age or older. The median age was 43 years. For every 100 females, there were 96.6 males. For every 100 females age 18 and over, there were 83.8 males.

The median household income was $29,722 and the median family income was $37,083. Males had a median income of $29,750 and females $26,250. The per capita income was $14,199. About 17.3% of families and 16.4% of the population were below the poverty line, including 7.3% of those under the age of eighteen and 33.3% of those sixty-five or over.
