= Shiloh National Military Park =

Historic Civil War site in Hardin County, Tennessee

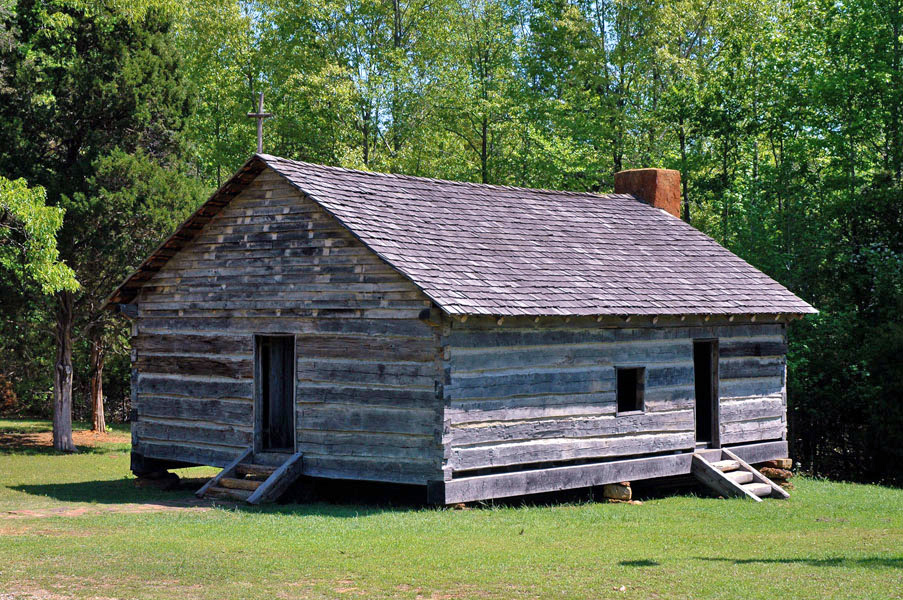
- Shiloh Church replica

- Location within Tennessee Location within Mississippi Location within the United States
- Location: Shiloh, Hardin County, Tennessee & Corinth, Mississippi, US
- Nearest city: Savannah, Tennessee
- Coordinates: 35°08′12″N 88°20′26″W
- Area: 9,324 acres (37.73 km^{2})
- Established: December 27, 1894
- Visitors: 371,735 (in 2023)
- Governing body: National Park Service
- Website: Shiloh National Military Park

Shiloh National Battlefield
- IUCN category III (natural monument or feature)
- Interactive map of Shiloh National Battlefield
- Governing body: National Park Service

Shiloh National Military Park preserves the American Civil War Shiloh and Corinth battlefields. The main section of the park is in the unincorporated community of Shiloh, about nine miles (14 km) south of Savannah, Tennessee, with additional areas located in the city of Corinth, Mississippi, 23 miles (37 km) southwest of Shiloh and the Parker's Crossroads Battlefield in the city of Parkers Crossroads, Tennessee. The Battle of Shiloh (April 6–7, 1862) began a six-month struggle for the key railroad junction at Corinth. Afterward, Union forces marched from Pittsburg Landing to take Corinth in a siege in May, then withstood a Confederate counter-attack in October.

The visitor center provides exhibitions, films and a self-guided auto-tour.

== Shiloh battlefield ==
The Battle of Shiloh was one of the first major battles in the Western Theater of the American Civil War. The two-day battle, April 6–7, 1862, involved about 65,000 Union troops under Ulysses S. Grant and Don Carlos Buell and 44,000 Confederates under Albert Sidney Johnston (killed in the battle) and P.G.T. Beauregard. The battle resulted in nearly 24,000 killed, wounded, and missing. The two days of fighting did not end in a decisive tactical victory for either side—the Union held the battlefield but failed to pursue the withdrawing Confederate forces. However, it was a decisive strategic defeat for the Confederate forces that had massed to oppose Grant's and Buell's invasion through Tennessee. After the Battle of Shiloh, the Union forces proceeded to capture Corinth and the critical railroad junction there.

The battlefield is named after Shiloh Methodist Church, a small log church near Pittsburg Landing, Tennessee. Pittsburg Landing is the point on the Tennessee River where the Union forces landed for the battle; they referred to the battle as "The Battle of Pittsburg Landing".

Shiloh Military Park Landmarks

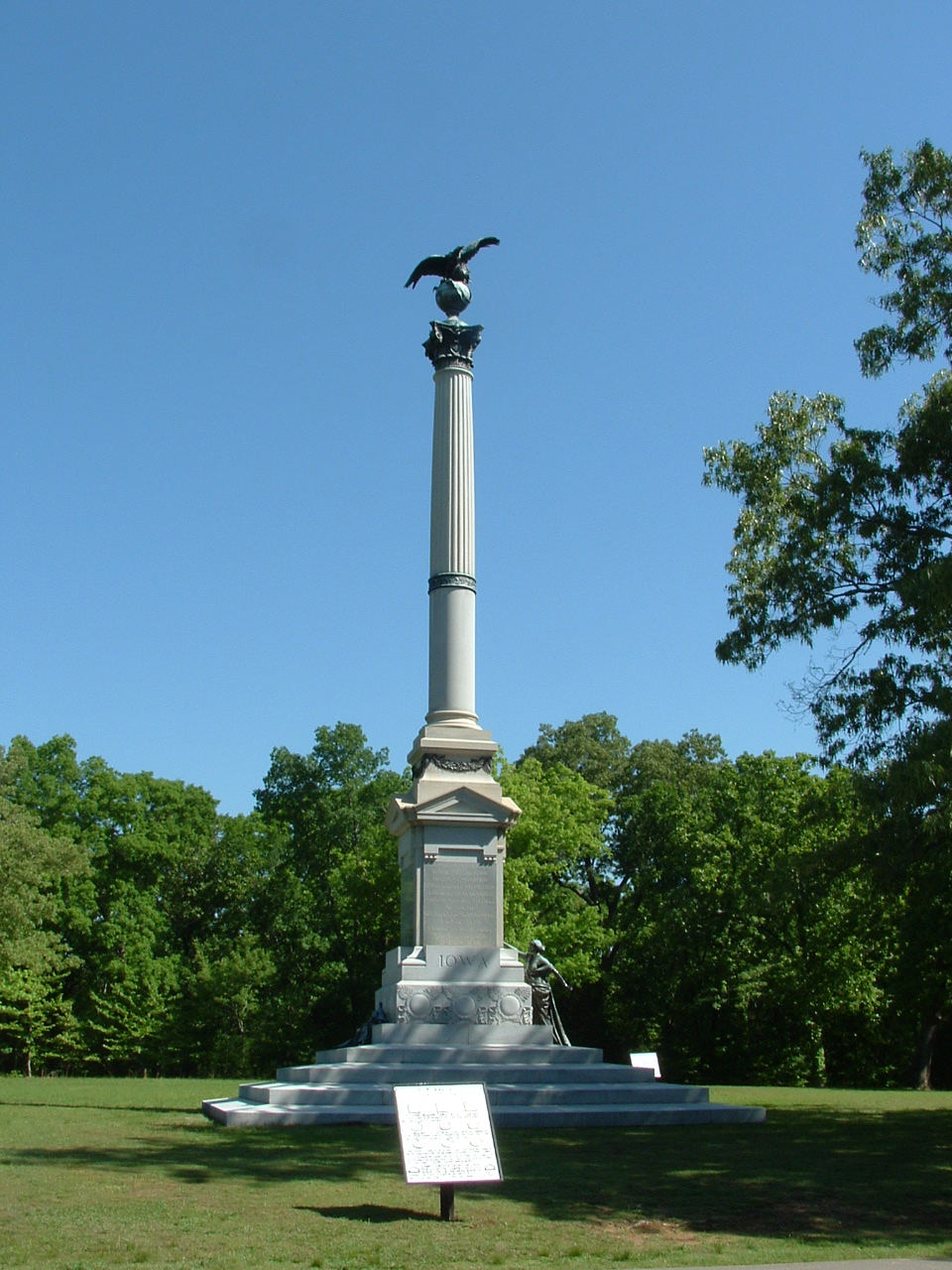
Iowa Monument

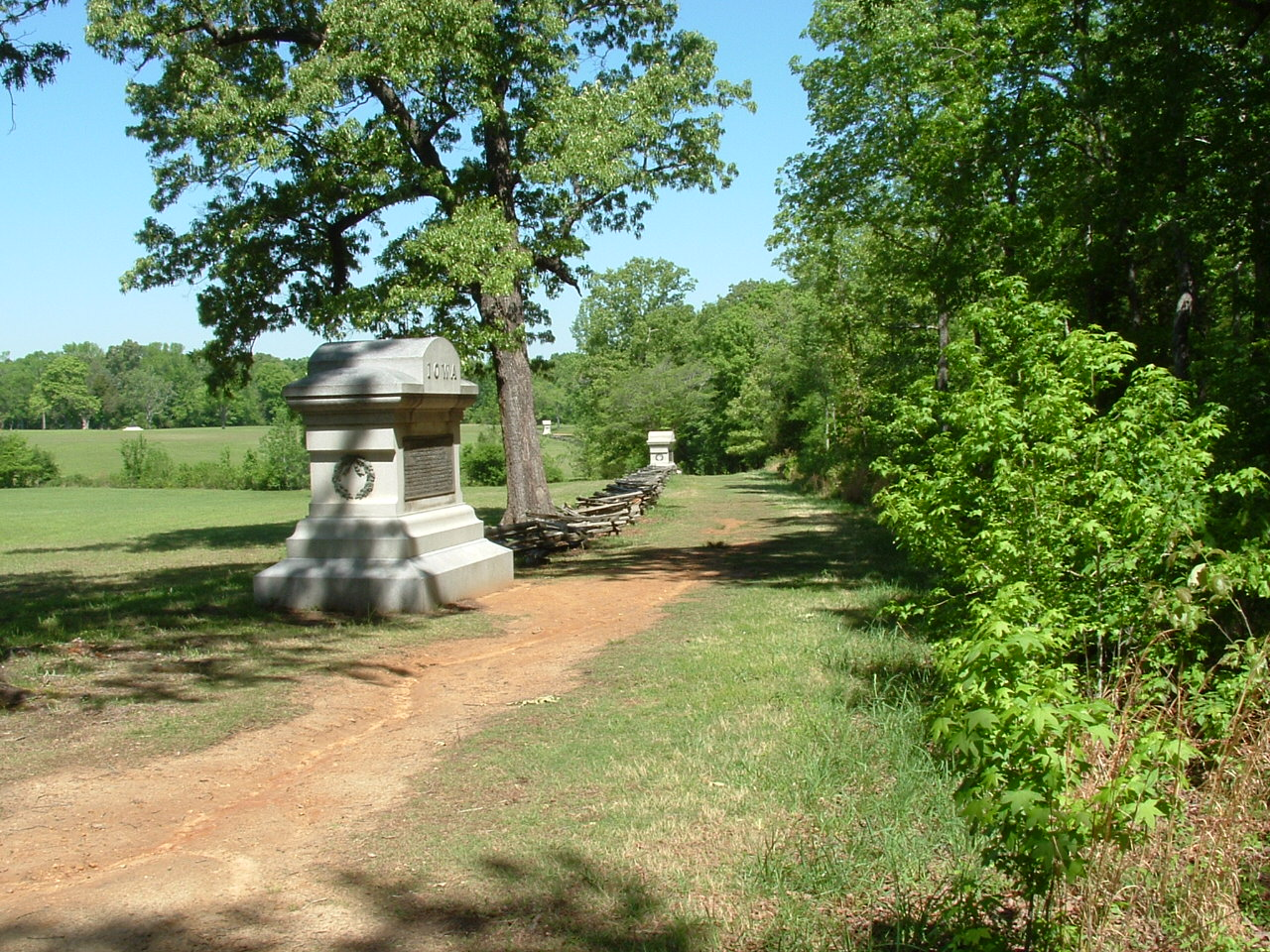
The Sunken Road

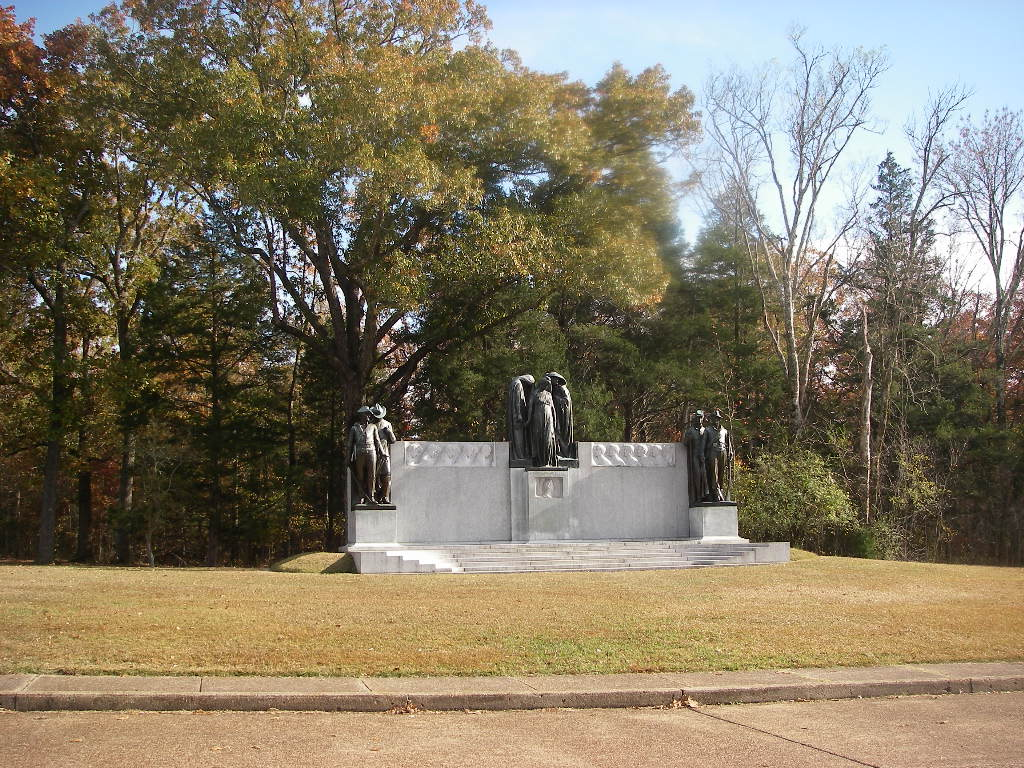
Confederate Memorial

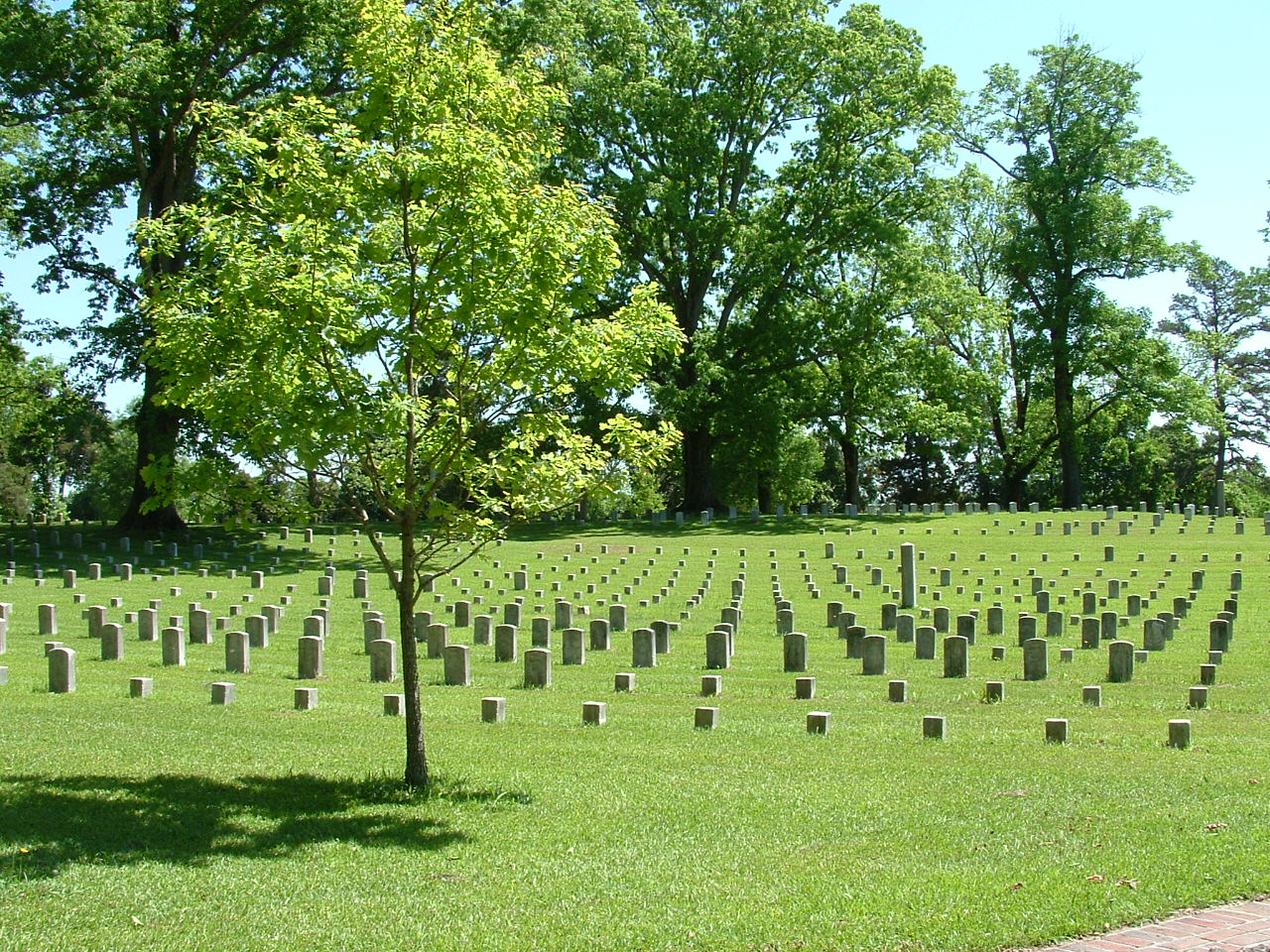
Shiloh National Cemetery

== Park information ==
- Total area: 3,997 acres (16.18 km^{2})
- Federal area: 3,942 acres (15.95 km^{2})
- Nonfederal area: 55 acres (0.22 km^{2})

The Shiloh National Military Park was established on December 27, 1894. In 1904, Basil W. Duke was appointed commissioner of Shiloh National Military Park by President Theodore Roosevelt. There were requests of local farmers who had grown tired of their pigs rooting up the remains of soldiers that had fallen during the battle, insisting that the federal government do something about it. The park was transferred from the War Department to the National Park Service on August 10, 1933. As with all historic areas administered by the National Park Service, the military park was listed on the National Register of Historic Places on October 15, 1966. On September 22, 2000, sites associated with the Corinth battlefield (see First and Second Battles of Corinth) were added to the park. The Siege and Battle of Corinth Sites was designated a National Historic Landmark on May 6, 1991. The National Park Travelers Club held its 2013 convention at Shiloh. As of early 2024, the American Battlefield Trust and its federal, state and local partners have acquired and preserved 1,554 acres (6.29 km^{2}) of the battlefield in more than 26 different transactions since 2001. Most of this land has been sold or conveyed to the National Park Service and incorporated into the park.

=== Visitor center ===
Permanent exhibitions, films, displays and self-guided 12-mile auto-tour, stopping at the Peach Orchard, the Hornet's Nest and General Johnston's death site.

== Shiloh National Cemetery ==
Shiloh National Cemetery is in the northeast corner of the park adjacent to the visitor center and bookstore. Buried within its 20.09 acres (81,300 m^{2}) are 3,584 Union dead (of whom 2,357 are unknown), who were re-interred in the cemetery created after the war, in 1866. There are two Confederate dead interred in the cemetery. The cemetery operations were transferred from War Department to the National Park Service in 1933. An unknown number of Confederate dead are interred in mass graves in the park.

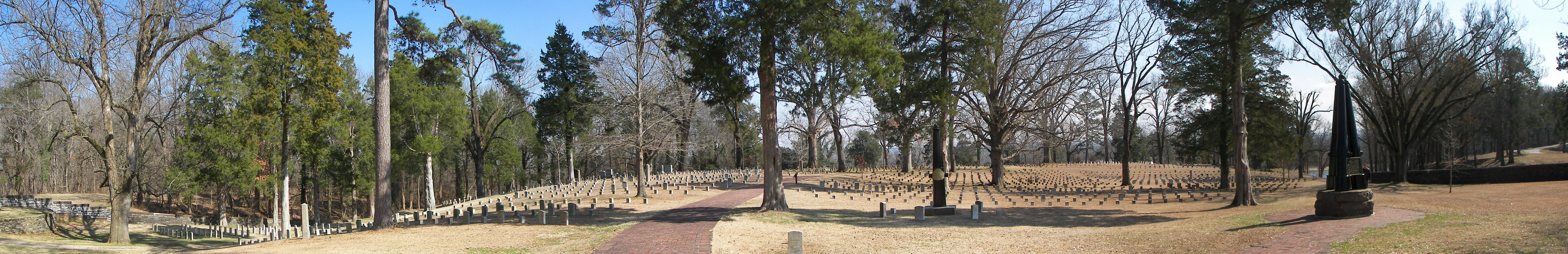
Panoramic view: slide bar to the right.

== Shiloh Indian Mounds Site ==
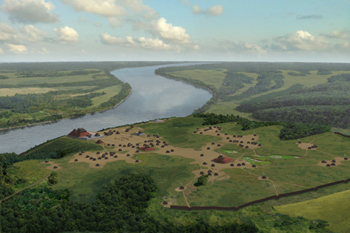
Shiloh Mounds aerial illustration

The Shiloh battlefield has within its boundaries the well preserved prehistoric Shiloh Indian Mounds Site, which is also a National Historic Landmark. The site was inhabited during the Early Mississippian period from about 1000 to 1450 CE.

== See also ==
- Memphis and Charleston Railroad
- List of Mississippian sites
