= Adamsville, Tennessee =

- City
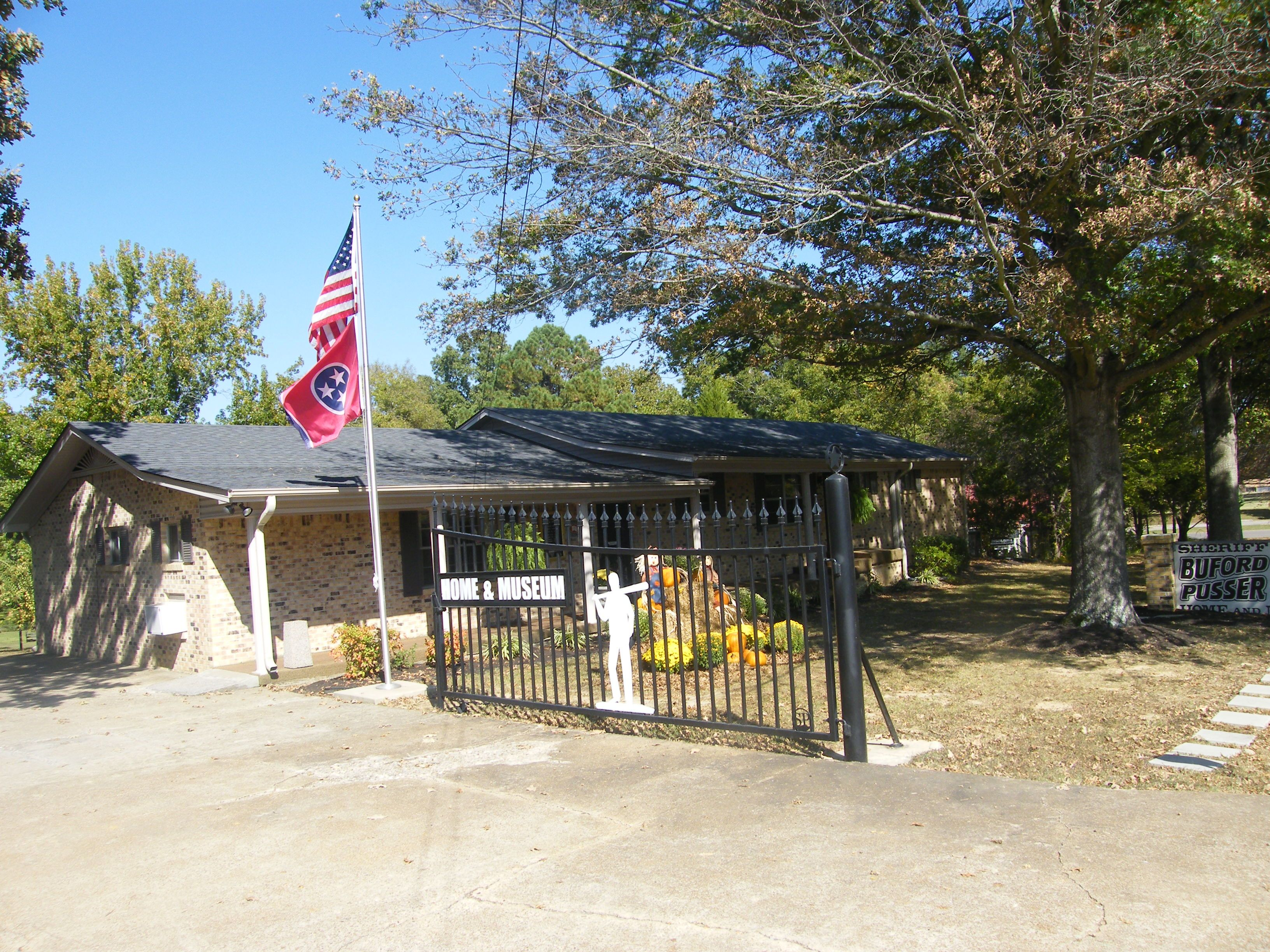
- Buford Pusser home
- Nicknames: A-Ville, The Ville
- Motto: The Biggest Little Town in Tennessee
- Location of Adamsville in McNairy County, Tennessee.
- Coordinates: 35°15′0″N 88°23′25″W
- Country: United States
- State: Tennessee
- Counties: McNairy, Hardin
- Incorporated: 1870

Government
  - Mayor: Jackie Hamm
  - Vice Mayor: Jennifer Frazier

Area
  - Total: 7.08 sq mi (18.35 km^{2})
  - Land: 7.04 sq mi (18.23 km^{2})
  - Water: 0.046 sq mi (0.12 km^{2})
- Elevation: 515 ft (157 m)

Population (2020)
  - Total: 2,265
  - Density: 321.8/sq mi (124.25/km^{2})
- Time zone: UTC-6 (Central (CST))
  - Summer (DST): UTC-5 (CDT)
- ZIP code: 38310
- Area code: 731
- FIPS code: 47-00240
- GNIS feature ID: 1269295
- Website: www.cityofadamsville.com

Adamsville is a city in Hardin and McNairy counties, Tennessee, United States. As of the 2020 census, Adamsville had a population of 2,265. Adamsville is named after George D. Adams, who operated an inn and stagecoach stop in the 1840s. Adamsville's nickname is the "Biggest Little Town in Tennessee" and was the home of Sheriff Buford Pusser.

== History ==
The area in and around Adamsville was first surveyed by Davy Crockett. Just after 1818, George C. Adams and his family were the first settlers of European ancestry to locate to the area. A trading post would be opened, just north of where the Adamsville Cemetery is today. The trading post served the local Native communities and Anglo settlers. In 1838 the Bell's detachment of the Trail of Tears traveled through Adamsville. Settlers from North Carolina and Maury County, Tennessee migrated to the area and the settlement developed an agricultural economy. When the Battle of Shiloh was fought in 1862, Union Army soldiers were camped in Adamsville. Prior to that battle, the Skirmish at Adamsville resulted in a Confederate victory.

Adamsville was incorporated in 1870. The town struggled to grow until roads were improved in the early 20th century. Agriculture remained the main economic developer until the textile industry came into the area with Myrna Mills factory opening, and then other factories following.

=== Severe Weather ===
In 1991 a strong F3 tornado ripped through the little town destroying homes, the tornado had also moved through neighboring city of Selmer.

On October 26, 2019, Post Tropical Storm Olga moved through the area, Adamsville being caught in the eyewall remnants experienced the worst damage in the area. The incident caused one death.

On March 31, 2023, a large and destructive EF3 tornado tore through the outskirts of town, killing 9 people and injuring 23. The tornado caused major damage to trees and many homes in the area.

== Geography ==
Adamsville is located at 35°15′0″N 88°23′25″W (35.250124, -88.390311).

According to the United States Census Bureau, the town has a total area of 6.9 square miles (18.0 km^{2}), of which 6.9 square miles (17.9 km^{2}) is land and 0.1 square mile (0.1 km^{2}) (0.72%) is water.

Adamsville is located primarily in McNairy County; only a small part of the municipal area lies in Hardin County.

== Demographics ==
Historical population
Census	Pop.	Note	%±
1900	459		—
1920	459		—
1930	643		40.1%
1940	719		11.8%
1950	927		28.9%
1960	1,046		12.8%
1970	1,344		28.5%
1980	1,453		8.1%
1990	1,745		20.1%
2000	1,983		13.6%
2010	2,207		11.3%
2020	2,265		2.6%

=== 2020 census ===
Adamsville racial composition
Race	Num.	Perc.
White (non-Hispanic)	2,066	91.21%
Black or African American (non-Hispanic)	59	2.6%
Native American	2	0.09%
Asian	10	0.44%
Other/Mixed	87	3.84%
Hispanic or Latino	41	1.81%

As of the 2020 United States census, there were 2,265 people, 836 households, and 519 families residing in the city.

=== 2000 census ===
As of the census of 2000, there were 1,983 people, 835 households, and 552 families residing in the city. The population density was 287.3 inhabitants per square mile (110.9/km^{2}). There were 937 housing units at an average density of 135.8 per square mile (52.4/km^{2}). The racial makeup of the city was 98.13% White, 1.01% African American, 0.05% Native American, 0.10% Asian, and 0.71% from two or more races. Hispanic or Latino of any race were 0.50% of the population.

There were 835 households, out of which 25.6% had children under the age of 18 living with them, 52.2% were married couples living together, 10.7% had a female householder with no husband present, and 33.8% were non-families. 31.4% of all households were made up of individuals, and 18.6% had someone living alone who was 65 years of age or older. The average household size was 2.20 and the average family size was 2.73.

In the city, the population was spread out, with 20.5% under the age of 18, 6.1% from 18 to 24, 23.4% from 25 to 44, 24.2% from 45 to 64, and 25.8% who were 65 years of age or older. The median age was 45 years. For every 100 females, there were 72.4 males. For every 100 females age 18 and over, there were 70.6 males.

The median income for a household in the city was $30,929, and the median income for a family was $37,993. Males had a median income of $31,154 versus $21,250 for females. The per capita income for the city was $18,806. About 13.0% of families and 16.2% of the population were below the poverty line, including 13.9% of those under age 18 and 36.0% of those age 65 or over.

== Economy ==
Adamsville has an 85-acre industrial park and four miles east of the town proper is the Tennessee Technology Center. Ripley Industries, a parts supplier for the automotive industry and related industrial fabricators, has its corporate headquarters in the town. Jones Exhaust Systems, engineering consultants Aqua Dynamics Group, Langley Wire Cloth Products, and Better Source Supply Company all have major locations in the town, as well. The Adamsville Partnership organization was formed by local businesses, property owners, professionals and related parties to promote the community.

== Arts and culture ==
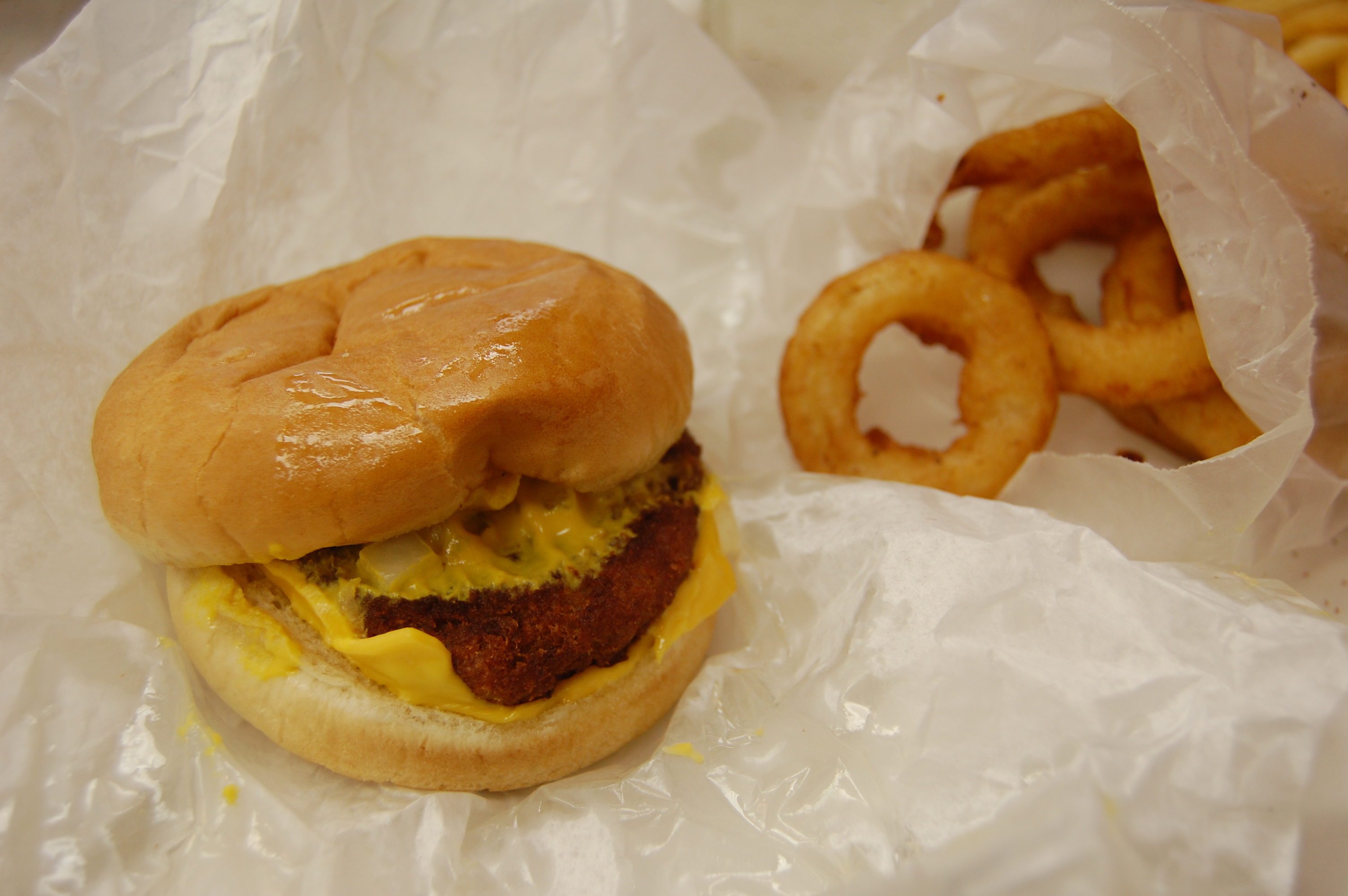
A slugburger with onion rings.

An Adamsville restaurant serves "slugburgers", a delicacy found in west Tennessee, northeast Mississippi and northwest Alabama. The Fat Cat slugburger consists of a hamburger patty made of beef and soy grits which is then deep fried and served on a bun with condiments. Another local delicacy found in restaurants is the baked cabbage.

=== Annual events ===
Adamsville holds a large number of annual events. Every Memorial Day weekend the four-day Buford Pusser Festival is held at the Buford Pusser Memorial Park. The local preliminary for Miss Tennessee, the Miss Walking Tall Pageant is held at The Marty Community Center. A number of other cultural events such as the HeeHaw Show, Founders Day, and a 5K Run in the spring.

=== Points of interest ===
The Buford Pusser Home and Museum is located in Adamsville in the former home of the county sheriff. Pusser is also buried in the Adamsville Cemetery. Gibb's Gas & Oil Collectibles is an appointment only museum of old gas pumps, gas and oil signs, oil cans, and other service station memorabilia. Adamsville's public library is the Irving Meek Jr. Memorial Library. The local War Memorial Park is located off of Highway 64 and Old Stage. It commemorates veterans and those who died from Adamsville in World War I and II, the Korean War and Vietnam War. The Old Home Motel was built in 1960 by Joe and Juanita Richardson. Buford Pusser lived at the hotel for a time, and Elvis Presley stayed the night there.

== Parks and recreation ==
Established in 1998, the Adamsville Recreation & Parks Department maintains flag and American football leagues, a cheerleading team, basketball and soccer teams. The city also offers other sports for youth and adults including softball and baseball. Every year the department plans a 5K run to coincide with the annual Buford Pusser Memorial Festival. The city park, also named after Buford Pusser, sits on land that was founded as a sandlot and horse barn by Pusser and the Adamsville Jaycees in 1973. The city park formed out of a fundraiser which featured musicians George Jones and Tammy Wynette, and continued funding and grants go towards improving the park. The city park has a lighted basketball court and tennis courts, a playground, three ball fields, an open-air pavilion, grills and picnic tables, and a walking track. Shiloh Golf Course is an 18-hole golf course. The golf course is on historical land: the number two and number four greens lie along the road where General Lew Wallace marched his three brigades to the Battle of Shiloh on April 6, 1862.

The department also maintains a senior center which distributes Meals on Wheels and related services. The Marty community center is also maintained by the Recreation & Parks department for public use and also has live entertainment, including the monthly Adamsville Bluegrass Jamboree.

== Government ==
Adamsville's government consists of the following: a City Commission, a mayor, and four commissioners. Every two years elections are held on the first Saturday of October, and the mayor and commissioners serve four year staggered terms. The city also has a city administrator, who serves in a full-time paid position overseeing general day-to-day needs of the city business.

== Schools ==
The town is served by two public schools: Adamsville Elementary School and Adamsville High School. The elementary school is accredited by the Southern Association of Colleges and Schools and serves Pre-Kindergarten 4 & 5 to 8th graders. The high school provides education to 9-12th graders in the county. The school has been listed as one of U.S. News & World Report's best high schools in America.

Adamsville High School's marching band has won 1st place at the TN Division 1 State Marching Band Championship nine times since 1999 and has not placed lower than 2nd since 2004. As the school's attendance grew in number, the band was eventually promoted to Division 2 status in 2016. The band won its first Division 2 championship in 2017 and repeated as champions in 2018 and 2019 making the band 12 time state champions. The school mascot is the cardinal.

== Historic people ==
Buford Pusser, legendary McNairy County sheriff

Ray Blanton, The 44th Governor of Tennessee.

Ashley Durham Booth, Miss Tennessee Teen USA 2006, Miss Tennessee USA 2011, and runner-up Miss USA 2011.

Dewey Phillips, Rock n' roll disc jockey. Phillips was the first DJ to spin a record of Elvis Presley on the air waves.
