= Tennessee State Route 198 =

State highway in Tennessee, United States

State Route 198
- SR 198 highlighted in red

Route information
- Maintained by TDOT
- Length: 13.3 mi (21.4 km)
- Existed: July 1, 1983–present

Major junctions
- South end: SR 197 south of Beech Bluff
- North end: US 70 in Jackson

Location
- Country: United States
- State: Tennessee
- Counties: Madison

Highway system
- Tennessee State Routes; Interstate; US; State
← SR 197	→ SR 199

State Route 198 (SR 198) is a relatively short, secondary north–south state highway located in West Tennessee. Although this road runs in a generally east to west direction, The Tennessee Department of Transportation has designated this as a north to south highway.

== Route description ==
SR 198 starts at an intersection with SR 197 in the southeast portion of Madison County. It passes through Beech Bluff at approximately 3.2 miles (5.1 km) north of its southern end. For most of its entire length it is known as the Beech Bluff Road until it nears the city limits of Jackson. It is then designated as East Chester Street until its termination. It ends in downtown at an intersection with US 70/SR 1.

== Major intersections ==
The entire route is in Madison County.

Location	mi	km	Destinations	Notes
	0.0	0.0	SR 197 (Mifflin Road) – Pinson, Mifflin	Southern terminus; provides access to Pinson Mounds State Archaeological Park
Jackson	13.3	21.4	US 70 (E Chester Street/Highway 70/SR 1) to US 45 Byp. / I-40 – Brownsville, Huntingdon	Northern terminus; provides access to McKellar-Sipes Regional Airport
1.000 mi = 1.609 km; 1.000 km = 0.621 mi
