= Tennessee State Route 197 =

State highway in Tennessee, United States

State Route 197
- SR 197 highlighted in red

Route information
- Maintained by TDOT
- Length: 12.5 mi (20.1 km)
- Existed: July 1, 1983–present

Major junctions
- West end: US 45 at Pinson
- SR 198 near Beech Bluff
- East end: SR 200 at Mifflin

Location
- Country: United States
- State: Tennessee
- Counties: Madison, Chester

Highway system
- Tennessee State Routes; Interstate; US; State
← SR 196	→ SR 198

State Route 197 (SR 197) is a secondary west–east state road located in West Tennessee.

== Route description ==
SR 197 starts at US 45 (SR 5) in Pinson in Madison County. It crosses the South Fork of the Forked Deer River and is called locally Ozier Road and after approximately 2.5 miles passes Pinson Mounds. At 4.0 miles along its length it passes through Five Points and becomes Diamond Grove Road. Diamond Grove Road continues for 3.9 miles and then makes a right turn onto Mifflin Road and in 0.4 of a mile passes the southern terminus of SR 198 before passing into Chester County at the 10.3 mile mark or 2 miles from SR 198. It then terminates in Mifflin at SR 200.

== Major intersections ==
County	Location	mi	km	Destinations	Notes
Madison	Pinson	0.0	0.0	US 45 (SR 5) – Jackson, Henderson	Western terminus
Madison	Pinson			Bridge over the South Fork of the Forked Deer River	
Madison				Pinson Mound Road - Pinson Mounds State Archaeological Park	One-way loop through the park
Madison				SR 198 north (Beech Bluff Road) – Beech Bluff, Jackson	Southern terminus of SR 198
Chester	Mifflin	12.5	20.1	SR 200 – Henderson, Lexington	Eastern terminus
1.000 mi = 1.609 km; 1.000 km = 0.621 mi
