= Tennessee State Route 200 =

State highway in Tennessee, United States

State Route 200
- SR 200 highlighted in red

Route information
- Maintained by TDOT
- Length: 21.8 mi (35.1 km)
- Existed: July 1, 1983–present

Major junctions
- South end: SR 365 at Henderson
- SR 197 at Mifflin
- North end: SR 22A at Lexington

Location
- Country: United States
- State: Tennessee
- Counties: Chester, Henderson

Highway system
- Tennessee State Routes; Interstate; US; State
← SR 199	→ SR 201

State Route 200 (SR 200) is a secondary south–north state road located in West Tennessee.

== Route description ==
SR 200 starts at SR 365 in Henderson in Chester County as Steed Street. It continues into rural Chester County as Mifflin Road where it crosses the South Fork of the Forked Deer River and then passes through unincorporated Mifflin, where it intersects SR 197. After passing through Mifflin it becomes known Garner Town Road and passes into Henderson County. It then passes through unincorporated Garner Town and then becomes known as Life Road before terminating in Lexington at SR 22A. SR 200 is, for the most part, a narrow winding road that runs mainly through farm land and rural residential areas.

== Major intersections ==
County	Location	mi	km	Destinations	Notes
Chester	Henderson	0.0	0.0	SR 365 (White Avenue)	Southern terminus
Chester				Bridge over the South Fork of the Forked Deer River	
Chester	Mifflin			SR 197 west – Pinson	Eastern terminus of SR 197; provides access to Pinson Mounds State Archaeological Park
Henderson	Lexington	21.8	35.1	SR 22A (Cook Street) – Lexington, Jacks Creek	Northern terminus
1.000 mi = 1.609 km; 1.000 km = 0.621 mi
