= Dan Morse =

American archaeologist (1935–2024)

- Born: Dan Franklin Morse; March 10, 1935; Wheeling, West Virginia, U.S.
- Died: September 26, 2024 (aged 89); Jonesboro, Arkansas, U.S.
- Education: Beloit College; University of Michigan
- Years active: c. 1960–1997
- Known for: Archaeologist

Dan Franklin Morse (March 10, 1935 – September 26, 2024) was an American archaeologist specializing in the prehistory of the midwestern United States and the central Mississippi Valley, research summarized in a number of books, monographs, and technical articles. He is best known for his 1983 synthesis of the "Archaeology of the Central Mississippi Valley" with Phyllis A. Morse, and for his 1997 volume issued by the Smithsonian Institution Press on "Sloan: A Paleoindian Dalton Cemetery in Arkansas." The Sloan site is the location of the oldest marked cemetery found to date in the Americas. He conducted excavations on a great many other significant archaeological sites during his career, including at Brand, Cahokia, Nodena, Parkin, and Zebree. Morse retired from his posts as Survey Archeologist for the Arkansas Archaeological Survey and as Professor of Anthropology at the University of Arkansas in 1997, after 30 years of service, but continued to work on publications and interact with students and colleagues on sites.

== Life and career ==
Dan F. Morse was born in Wheeling, West Virginia, on March 10, 1935. He attended Beloit College, a campus is known for its prehistoric Native American mounds. His medical doctor father, Dan Morse, was a vocational archaeologist and forensic anthropologist, and encouraged his son by taking him on digs and exposing him to scientific rigor and professional archaeologists. There was never any doubt in Dan's mind on his chosen career path. The early experiences gave Morse the ability to conform to the processual archaeology of the 1960s and after. He met his wife to be, Phyllis Anderson (Morse), on the Etowah site in 1958, both having been recruited by Dr James B. Griffin, their mentor at the University of Michigan where they were both conducting graduate studies. As a married couple the Morses are unusual in the field of archaeology, writing and publishing many papers together. They have worked on many projects, often with their three sons in the field, in many parts of the southeastern US. Morse has a reputation as a great excavator, with an ability to distinguish minute variations in soil deposits based on subtle differences in texture ('feel') and color. Morse was drafted into Military Service in 1962, working in the U.S. Army Counterintelligence Corps. The next few years saw Morse employed at the University of Alabama in Huntsville, Idaho State University, University of Tennessee, and Indiana University. He was a research assistant at the University of Michigan while completing his PhD (1967). In 1967 he took a post with the then-newly formed Arkansas Archeological Survey, stationed at Arkansas State University in Jonesboro, in the northeast portion of the state. Morse split his time between teaching and as a Survey Archaeologist. He was charged with finding, mapping, and excavating sites and disseminating the results of this activity. Morse spent 31 years investigating and documenting archaeological resources in northeast Arkansas and the Central Mississippi Valley. Significant Paleo-Indian era Dalton finds were excavated at the Brand and Sloan sites, and in the mid-1970s Morse directed archaeological salvage excavations of the early Mississippian Zebree site. He and his wife Phyllis conducted work on sites in northeast Arkansas associated with the De Soto's Expedition, which spent significant time in the region in the early 1540s. In 1983 he and Phyllis published a major synthesis volume The Archaeology of the Central Mississippi Valley. The Sloan report was published in 1997 and as Morse explained “our procrastination was unfortunate but actually many of the needed analyses were not possible until 20 years after the excavation”. Morse retired in 1997, although he has remained active in archaeology since, working on a number of archaeological projects in North Carolina and elsewhere.

Morse died at his home in Jonesboro, Arkansas, on September 26, 2024, at the age of 89.

== Key sites ==
- Nodena phase: A group of 60 or so archaeological sites that gives its name to a late prehistoric early historic period phase in the central Mississippi Valley located within the Mississippi River Counties of northeast Arkansas. The Upper Nodena site was a principal town of the culture, and was characterized by an ordered arrangement of structures around a mound and plaza. Research was started in the 1940s by Phillips, Ford and Griffin (1951) and a field school was conducted at the site by Dan Morse in 1973.
- Pinson Mounds: Located in Tennessee, the site is the largest Middle Woodland period mound group in the United States, and dates to about 1-400 A.D. In 1963 Morse undertook the first extensive professional excavations at the site.
- Sloan: A Paleo-Indian Dalton Cemetery in Arkansas, the earliest recognized cemetery in the New World, dating to ca 12,000 years ago. A final report on the excavations was published in 1997. Dalton culture is typified by the use of a projectile point type that was similar but different to the earlier Clovis culture.
- Zebree: A multi-disciplinary ‘salvage’ operation in Arkansas of an early Mississippian site before it was destroyed in 1976. Excavation took place between 1968 and 1976 against a strict timetable and with limited resources. Dan F. Morse was the Project Director.

== Influences and legacy ==
The esteem in which Dan and his wife Phyllis are held is represented best by the collection of essays published for their retirement.

The contributors wanted to honor their contribution to Arkansas archaeology. Mary Kwas, in the first chapter, chronicles their careers and includes statements of personal and professional testament that leaves no doubt of the breadth and depth of their work.

Dan was the major professor overseeing the MA research of three students at the University of Arkansas, each of whom subsequently went on to have productive careers in southeastern archaeology, David G. Anderson, J. Christopher Gillam, and Albert Goodyear.

In 2005, Dan and Phyllis Morse received the Lifetime Achievement Award from the Southeastern Archaeological Conference. Additionally, on retirement, the Quapaw tribe presented the Morses with colorful tribal blankets in honor of the sensitive work that had been undertaken on their ancestors’ burial mounds. Dan F Morse has served on a number of MA and PhD committees at several institutions.

Mary Kwas notes that his early experience prepared Dan to work with enthusiasts and amateur archaeologists of the Arkansas Archaeological Society.

== Selected publications ==
- Morse, Dan, George Schoenbeck, and Dan F. Morse 1953 Fielder Site. Journal of Illinois State Archaeological Society 3:35-46.
- Morse Dan F., and Phyllis A Morse 1960 A Preliminary Report on 9-GO-507: the Williams Site, Gordon County, Georgia. Florida Anthropologist 13:81-99
- Griffin, James B., and Dan F Morse1961 The Short-nosed God from the Emmons site, Illinois American Antiquity 26: 560-563
- Morse, Dan F., Phyllis A Morse, and John Waggoner, Jr. 1964 Fluted Points from Smith County Tennessee. Tennessee Archaeologist 20: 16-33
- Morse, Dan F. 1964 The Brake Site: a Possible early 19th century Log Cabin in Stewart County, Tennessee. Florida Anthropologist 17:165-176.
- Morse, Dan F., and Samuel D. Smith 1973 The Hazel Site: Archeological Salvage During the Construction of Route 308. Arkansas Archeologist 14: 36-77
- Morse Dan F., 1986 Preliminary Investigation of the Pinson Mounds Site: 1963 Field Season. In Pinson Mounds: a Middle Woodland Ceremonial Center; Appendix 3 by Robert C. Mainfort Jr. Tennessee Department of Conservation, Division of Archaeology, Research Series No.7
- Morse, Dan F. 1990 The Spanish Exploration of Arkansas. In Columbian Consequences, edited by David Hurst Thomas, pp. 197–210. Smithsonian Press
- Morse Dan F. and Russell Graham 1991 Searching for Palaolama. In Field Notes, Newsletter of the Arkansas Archaeological Society 239: 10-12
- Morse Dan F., 1991 On the Possible Origin of the Quapaw in Northeast Arkansas. In Arkansas before the Americans edited by Hester A Davis, pp40–54 Arkansas Archeological Survey Research Series No. 40
- Morse, Dan F. 1992 The Seventeenth Century Michigamea Village Location in Arkansas, in Calumet and Fleur-de-Lys, edited by John Walthall and Thomas Emerson. Smithsonian Institution Press.
- Morse Dan F., Phyllis A. Morse, Paul and Hazel Delcourt 1993 History, Evolution and Organization of Vegetation and Human Culture, Chapter Two in Biotic Communities of the Southeastern United States, edited by William H. Martin, Stephen G. Boyce and Arthur C. Ecternacht. John Wiley & Sons, Inc.
- Morse Dan F., David G. Anderson and Albert C. Goodyear 1996 The Pleistocene-Holocene Transition in the Eastern United States. In Humans at the End of the Ice Age: The Archaeology of the Pleistocene-Holocene Transition, editors Lawrence G. Straus, Berit V. Eriksen, Jon M. Erlenadson and David R. Yesner, Chapter 16, pp319–338. Plenum Press, New York

== See also ==
- Etowah Indian Mounds
- Nodena site
- Pinson Mounds
