= David G. Anderson =

American archaeologist

David G. Anderson (born 1949) is an archaeologist in the department of anthropology at the University of Tennessee, Knoxville, who specializes in Southeastern archaeology. His professional interests include climate change and human response, exploring the development of cultural complexity in Eastern North America, maintaining and improving the nation's Cultural Resource management (CRM) program, teaching and writing about archaeology, and developing technical and popular syntheses of archaeological research. He is the project director of the on-line Paleoindian Database of the Americas (PIDBA). and a co-director, with Joshua J. Wells, Eric C, Kansa, and Sarah Whitcher Kansa, of the Digital Index of North American Archaeology (DINAA)

The majority of Anderson's career has been involved in Cultural Resources Management (CRM) archaeology. Graduating from high school in Milledgeville, Georgia, he went to Case Western Reserve University for his undergraduate education. He did not have an interest in anthropology initially, but switched to it after taking classes in physics, biology, and classics. The change was inspired by an introductory anthropology course he took during his sophomore year. Anthropology intrigued Anderson because it focused on major questions of human existence, such as why people fought wars, practice religion, or organized themselves the way they do in groups and cultures. The major historical figures of the field of anthropology were not afraid to tackle big questions or to challenge accepted stereotypes about race or culture, and this appealed to Anderson's 1960s-era idealism. Because of his own experience, Anderson feels that well-taught introductory courses in archaeology or anthropology can be crucial in recruiting new members to the profession.

Upon graduation with a BA in 1972, Anderson volunteered on archaeological field projects in southwestern New Mexico for several months. Continuing with volunteer work over the next two years, in 1974, Anderson began his first full-time job in archaeology at the South Carolina Institute of Archaeology and Anthropology (SCIAA) in a research assistant's position largely funded by CRM work. At SCIAA his mentors included Robert L. Stephenson, Leland Ferguson; Albert Goodyear, and Stanley A. South. He subsequently received an assistantship with the Arkansas Archaeological Survey that enabled him to complete an M.A. in anthropology at the University of Arkansas. While at Arkansas, Anderson worked with materials from the Toltec Mounds Archeological State Park in central Arkansas under the direction of Martha Rolingson, and on the Zebree Homestead site, an early Mississippian period village that was being draglined away during the final 1976 field season as a part of a Corps of Engineers channelization project. The research at Zebree, a project directed by Dan Morse and Phyllis Morse, explored the emergence of Mississippian culture in this part of the Mississippi Valley. Anderson recognized very early in his career that CRM offered exciting research opportunities; occasionally with massive levels of funding, and that an M.A. was sufficient for a person to direct such projects. The way to continue to have these opportunities, he recognized, was to conduct the best possible research and to write informative and interesting reports that touched on the lives of past peoples and not merely the description of artifacts and features, so that the funding agencies could see that their money was actually providing valuable information about past human behavior.

Upon the conclusion of the Zebree project in 1977, Anderson took a job for seven years with a CRM firm in Michigan, Commonwealth Associates, Inc. In this position, Anderson directed progressively larger survey and excavation projects in the southeast and southwest. In 1983 Anderson enrolled in the University of Michigan anthropology doctoral program, where he spent the next three years on campus taking courses. After his classwork was completed in 1986, Anderson took a job with another CRM company, Garrow and Associates, in Atlanta, Georgia. With Garrow and associates, Anderson directed a major survey project in northeast Arkansas, examining approximately 90 miles (140 km) of the L'Anguille River channel margin, and also wrote two major archaeological syntheses, of the Richard B. Russell Multiple Resource Area CRM program (with J. W. Joseph). and of the Fort Polk CRM program. In 1988 he joined the National Park Service where he worked until 2004. That same year he was awarded a dissertation fellowship from the Department of Energy's Oak Ridge Associated Universities’ Laboratory Graduate Participation Program. The DOE fellowship gave Anderson an office in the Department of Energy's Savannah River Site facility near Williston, South Carolina, the rural community where his family currently resides. In 1974 and 1975, while with SCIAA, he had participated in the initial archaeological survey of the 328-square-mile (850 km^{2}) complex. In 1990, Anderson completed his dissertation, Political Change in Chiefdom Societies: Cycling in the Late Prehistoric Southeastern United States, that focused on chiefly cycling, how and why these kinds of societies emerge, expand, and collapse. The dissertation was also a synthesis of Mississippian archaeology in the Savannah River basin, with much of the data obtained from CRM work. It was published in 1994 as The Savannah River Chiefdoms: Political Change in the Late Prehistoric Southeast. Upon completion of his dissertation, Anderson returned to the National Park Service's Technical Assistance and Partnerships Division. In 2004, Anderson joined the Department of Anthropology at the University of Tennessee.

At the Andersons' restored plantation home in South Carolina, for many years they have held a barbecue for researchers working at the nearby Topper archaeological site, an event that drew leading paleontologists, archeologists and anthropologists from around the country. The home also is known for its atlatl practice range in the yard.

== Background ==
Anderson was born in St. Louis, MO in 1949, but he spent his childhood and teenage years in various locations including in the northeast, midwest, and southeast, graduating from high school in Milledgeville, GA in 1967. Anderson received his BA in anthropology from Case Western Reserve University in 1972. He received his master's degree in anthropology in 1979 from the University of Arkansas, and he received his PhD from the University of Michigan with a dissertation on Political Change in Chiefdom Societies: Cycling in the Late Prehistoric Southeastern United States in 1990. Anderson has conducted field work and led field projects in many locations in the Eastern United States, as well as projects in the southwest and the Caribbean. His work is documented in over 200 publications, including some 40 technical monographs, and 7 books.

== Employment history ==
Anderson has worked in many different jobs relating to archaeology. Currently (2009–present) he is a professor in the Department of Anthropology at the University of Tennessee, where he was previously an associate professor from 2004 to 2009. He joined the University of Tennessee faculty after spending 15 years with the National Park Service, first with the Interagency Archaeological Services Division from 1988 to 1996 in Atlanta, and from 1996 to 2003 with the Southeast Archeological Center in Tallahassee Florida. Anderson also worked as a research assistant with the University of South Carolina (1974–1975), as a Survey Assistant with the Arkansas Archeological Survey (1975–1977), and as an archaeologist with Commonwealth Associates, Inc. (1977–1983), and later, after attending graduate school at the University of Michigan (1983–1986), as an archaeologist with Garrow and Associates, Inc. (1986–1988).

== Awards and honors ==
Anderson has received a number of professional awards from his colleagues, including being elected as a Fellow of the American Association for the Advancement of Science in 2014, and receiving the Lifetime Achievement Award from the Southeastern Archaeological Conference in 2018. Other recognitions include the Excellence in Cultural Resource Management Research Award from the Society for American Archaeology (1999), the Dissertation Prize from the Society for American Archaeology (1991), and the first C. B. Moore Award for Excellence in Southeastern Archaeological Studies by the Lower Mississippi Valley Survey/Southeastern Archaeological Conference (1990). In 2006 he was elected President-elect of the Southeastern Archaeological Conference and served as President of that organization from 2008 to 2010. He has served as president of the South Carolina Council of Professional Archaeologists (1992–1993), The Tennessee Council for Professional Archaeology (2006–2007), and the Archaeological Society of South Carolina (1998–1999), and as an officer or board member in a number of state, regional, and national professional organizations.

== Key excavations ==
Anderson has led or participated in numerous field or analysis projects, including at the Winn Canyon site, New Mexico (1972); the Cal Smoak site, South Carolina (1973–1974); the Zebree Homestead and Toltec Mounds Archeological State Park sites, Arkansas (1975–1977); at several sites along Congaree Creek in South Carolina (1974–1978); at the Mattassee Lake sites, South Carolina (1979); at Rucker's Bottom and several other sites in the Richard B. Russell Multiple Resource Area, Georgia and South Carolina (1980–1988); in the L'Anguille River basin, Arkansas (1987); at Fort Polk, Louisiana (1987–2003), at Fort Pulaski, Georgia (1990); on Water Island, U.S. Virgin Islands (1991–2000); at the Shiloh Indian Mounds with John E. Cornelison, Jr., Shiloh National Military Park (1999–2004); on the Francis Marion National Forest, South Carolina (1980–present); along the Cumberland River near Nashville, Tennessee (2009–2012); and at the Topper site in Allendale County, South Carolina (2015-2017) where the research focus was on the dense late precontact occupations.

== Research Emphases ==
Anderson has helped develop models of Early Archaic settlement in the Southeast involving mobility and interaction at the band and macroband scale (with Glen Hanson)).; Paleoindian colonization scenarios in the Americas, including the idea of 'staging areas' where early populations concentrated and from which they later radiated out over the surrounding region; least cost movement pathways for initial colonizing populations in the Americas (with Chris Gillam); and the causes of late prehistoric chiefly cycling behavior, the emergence and collapse of complex chiefdoms against a regional background of simple chiefdoms, a concept initially noted by Marshall Sahlins and elaborated upon by Henry T. Wright. Anderson has also examined global climate change including projected sea level rise and its impacts on prehistoric and early historic cultures in the Southeast and beyond; and has helped prepare edited volumes synthesizing research on the Paleoindian and Early Archaic, Middle Archaic, and Woodland periods in the southeastern United States.

== Selected books and monographs ==
- Archeological Investigations at Shiloh Indian Mounds National Historic Landmark 40HR7, 1999–2004. (David G. Anderson, John E. Cornelison, Jr., and Sarah C. Sherwood). Southeast Archeological Center, National Park Service, Tallahassee, Florida. 826pp.
- Recent Developments in Southeastern Archaeology. (David G. Anderson and Kenneth E. Sassaman). 2012. Society for American Archaeology Press, Washington, D.C.
- Climate Change and Cultural Dynamics: A Global Perspective on Mid-Holocene Transitions (David G. Anderson, Kirk A. Maasch, and Daniel H. Sandweiss, editors). 2007. Academic Press, Amsterdam, the Netherlands.
- The Archaeology and History of Water Island, U.S. Virgin Islands. 2003 (David G. Anderson, David Knight, and Emily M. Yates). Southeast Archeological Center, National Park Service, Tallahassee, Florida. 310 pp + CD.
- Archaeology, History, and Predictive Modeling: Research on Fort Polk 1972–2002. (David G. Anderson and Steven D. Smith). 2003. University of Alabama Press, Tuscaloosa.
- The Woodland Southeast. (David G. Anderson and Robert C. Mainfort, Jr., editors). 2002. University of Alabama Press, Tuscaloosa.
- The Paleoindian and Early Archaic Southeast. (David G. Anderson and Kenneth E. Sassaman, editors). 1996. University of Alabama Press.
- The Archaeology of the Mid-Holocene Southeast. (Kenneth E. Sassaman and David G. Anderson, editors). 1996. University Presses of Florida.
- The Savannah River Chiefdoms: Political Change in the Late Prehistoric Southeast. (1994) University of Alabama Press.
- Cultural Resource Investigations in the L'Anguille River Basin, Lee, St. Francis, Cross, and Poinsett Counties, Arkansas. 1989. (David G. Anderson, Hazel R. Delcourt, Paul A. Delcourt, John E. Foss, and Phyllis A. Morse). Garrow & Associates, Inc. Final Contract DACW66–87–C–0046 Report, Memphis District, U.S. Army Corps of Engineers.
- Prehistory and History Along the Upper Savannah River: Technical Synthesis of Cultural Resource Investigations, Richard B. Russell Multiple Resource Area. 1988 (David G. Anderson and J. W. Joseph). National Park Service, Interagency Archeological Services–Atlanta, Russell Papers.
- Prehistoric Human Ecology Along the Upper Savannah River: Excavations at the Rucker's Bottom, Abbeville and Bullard Site Groups. 1985 (David G. Anderson and Joseph Schuldenrein, assemblers). National Park Service, Interagency Archaeological Services–Atlanta, Russell Papers.
- The Mattassee Lake Sites: Archaeological Investigations along the Lower Santee River in the Coastal Plain of South Carolina. 1982 (David G. Anderson, Charles E. Cantley, and A. Lee Novick). National Park Service, Interagency Archaeological Services–Atlanta, Special Publication 1.
- Francis Marion National Forest; Cultural Resources Overview 1981 (David G. Anderson and Patricia A. Logan). USDA Forest Service, Washington, D.C.
- Cal Smoak: Archaeological Investigations Along the Edisto River in the Coastal Plain of South Carolina (David G. Anderson, Sammy T. Lee and A. Robert Parler). Occasional Papers No. 1, Archaeological Society of South Carolina.

== Selected papers ==
- Paleoindian Settlement in the Southeastern United States: The Role of Large Databases. 2019. In New Directions in the Search for the First Floridans, edited by David Thulman and Irv Garrison, pp. 241–275. University Press of Florida, Gainesville. (Anderson, David G., David Echeverry, D. Shane Miller, Andrew A. White, Stephen J. Yerka, Eric C. Kansa, Sarah Whitcher Kansa, Christopher R. Moore, Kelsey Noack Myers, Joshua J. Wells, Thaddeus G. Bissett, and Ashley M. Smallwood).
- Using CRM Data for “Big Picture” Research. 2018. In New Perspectives in Cultural Resource Management, edited by Francis P. McManamon, pp 197–212. Routledge Press, New York.
- Sea-level rise and archaeological site destruction: An example from the southeastern United States using DINAA (Digital Index of North American Archaeology). 2017. (Anderson, David G., Thaddeus G. Bissett, Yerka, Stephen J., Wells, Joshua J., Kansa, Eric C., Kansa, Sarah W., Myers, Kelsey Noack, DeMuth, R. Carl, and White, Devin A.) PLoS ONE 12(11): e0188142. https://doi.org/10.1371/journal.pone.0188142
- The End of the Southeastern Archaic: Regional Interaction and Archaeological Interpretation. 2010. In Trend, Tradition, and Turmoil: What Happened to the Southeastern Archaic? edited by David Hurst Thomas and Matthew C. Sanger, pp 273–302. Proceedings of the Third Caldwell Conference, St. Catherines Island, Georgia, May 9–11, 2008. Anthropological Papers of the American Museum of Natural History, New York, NY.
- Human Settlement in the New World: Multidisciplinary Approaches, the ‘Beringian’ Standstill, and the Shape of Things to Come. 2010. In Human Variation in the Americas: The Integration of Archaeology and Biological Anthropology, edited by Benjamin M. Auerbach, pp. 311–346. Center for Archaeological Investigations, Occasional Paper 38, Southern Illinois University, Carbondale.
- Cycling in the Complexity of Early Societies. 2010. (Sergey Gavrilets, David G. Anderson, and Peter Turchin). Cliodynamics: The Journal of Theoretical and Mathematical History 1:58–80. (Sergey Gavrilets, David G. Anderson, and Peter Turchin). Also available at http://escholarship.org/uc/item/5536t55r
- PIDBA (Paleoindian Database of the Americas) 2010: Current Status and Findings. 2010. (David G. Anderson, D. Shane Miller, Stephen J. Yerka, J. Christopher Gillam, Erik N. Johanson, Derek T. Anderson, Albert C. Goodyear, and Ashley M. Smallwood). Archaeology of Eastern North America 38:63-90.
- The Toltec Mounds Site in Southeastern Prehistory: Inferences from Early Collections. 2008. The Arkansas Archeologist 47:9-30.
- Eco-Cultural Niche Modeling: New Tools for Reconstructing the Geography and Ecology of Past Human Populations. 2006. PaleoAnthropology 2006:68-83. (William E. Banks, Francesco d’Errico, Harold L. Dibble, Leonard Krishtalka, DixieWest, Deborah I. Olszewski, A. Townsend Peterson, David G. Anderson, J. Christopher Gillam, Anta Montet-White, Michel Crucifix, Curtis W. Marean, María-Fernanda Sánchez-Goñi, Barbara Wohlfarth, and Marian Vanhaeran)
- Pleistocene Human Occupation of the Southeastern United States: Research Directions for the Early 21st Century. 2005. In Paleoamerican Origins: Beyond Clovis, edited by Robson Bonnichsem, Bradley T. Lepper, Dennis Stanford, and Michael R. Waters, pp. 29–43. Texas A&M University Press, College Station.
- Early and Middle Holocene Periods, 9500-3750 B.C. 2004. (David G. Anderson and Kenneth E. Sassaman). Southeast volume, Smithsonian Handbook of North American Indians, edited by Raymond D. Fogelson, pp. 87–100. Smithsonian Institution, Washington, D.C.
- Late Holocene Period, 3750 to 650 B.C. 2004. (Kenneth E. Sassaman and David G. Anderson) Southeast volume, Smithsonian Handbook of North American Indians, edited by Raymond D. Fogelson, pp. 101–114. Smithsonian Institution, Washington, D.C.
- Archaic Mounds and the Archaeology of Southeastern Tribal Societies. 2004. In Signs of Power: The Development of Complexity in the Southeast, edited by Jon L. Gibson and Philip J. Carr, pp. 270–299. The University of Alabama Press, Tuscaloosa.
- Archaeology and Anthropology in the 21st Century Strategies for Working Together. 2003. In Archaeology is Anthropology, edited by Susan D. Gillespie and Deborah L. Nichols, pp. 111–127. Anthropological Papers of the American Anthropological Association 13. Arlington, Virginia.
- Evolution of Tribal Social Organization in the Southeast. The Archaeology of Tribal Societies, edited by William A. Parkinson. 2002. International Monographs in Prehistory, Ann Arbor.
- Climate and Culture Change in Prehistoric and Early Historic Eastern North America. 2001. Archaeology of Eastern North America 29:143-186.
- Paleoindian Colonization of the Americas: Implications from an Examination of Physiography, Demography, and Artifact Distributions. (David G. Anderson and J. Christopher Gillam). 2000. American Antiquity 65:43-66.
- Paleoclimate and the Potential Food Reserves of Mississippian Societies: A Case Study from the Savannah River Valley. 1995 (David G. Anderson, David W. Stahle, and Malcolm R. Cleaveland). American Antiquity 60:258–286.
- The Paleoindian Colonization of Eastern North America: A View from the Southeastern United States. In Early Paleoindian Economies of Eastern North America, edited by Kenneth Tankersley and Barry Isaac, pp. 163–216. Research in Economic Anthropology Supplement 5.
- Early Archaic Occupations in the Southeastern United States: A Case Study from the Savannah River Basin. 1988.(David G. Anderson and Glen T. Hanson). American Antiquity 53:262–286.
