= Paleoindian Database of the Americas =

The Paleoindian Database of the Americas (PIDBA), is a website dedicated to the compilation of projectile point and other relevant data pertaining to Paleoindian site assemblages across the Americas. As of April 2011, the PIDBA database contains information pertaining to locational data (n=29,393), attribute data (n=15,254), and image data (n= ca. 7,500) on Paleoindian projectile points and other tools in North America and also includes bibliographic references, radiocarbon dates, and maps created making use of database and GIS data. The PIDBA site provides a database that is useful in studying stylistic and morphological variability, lithic raw material usage and procurement strategies, geographic distributions of technology, and land use strategies during the Paleoindian period, which took place prior to ca. 11,450 cal year BP. The PIDBA database also serves a function as an intermediary between academic and advocational archaeologists in the collection and integration of primary projectile point data. Overall, the PIDBA project aims to compile data from multiple sources into a comprehensive database, while simultaneously seeking out and including new data. The PIDBA website contains a large amount of primary data collected and donated by researchers and advocational archaeologists from all over the Americas ranging from metric measurements to the type of chert any particular piece is made from. It is the voluntary contributions of primary data from these researchers that makes PIDBA possible. While it is understandable that researchers would like to fully examine and publish on their data, the site's philosophy is that it is important to disseminate information freely, so that other researchers can work with it. This allows researchers to make new discoveries that they perhaps would not be possible otherwise.

== History of Paleoindian Data Compilation in North America ==
The concept of Paleoindian data collection and compilation is not new. As early as the 1930s efforts such as those by John L. Cotter documented the distribution of fluted points across North America. Similar efforts were undertaken by Stephen Williams and James B. Stoltman in 1965. However, the first true regional synthesis would not take place for nearly twenty years, when Louis A. Brennan published his 1982 survey of 5,820 projectile points, which covered artifact finds in 17 states and 2 Canadian provinces, mostly from along the Atlantic coast. David Meltzer also conducted a survey in the mid-1980s focusing on fluted point form morphological variability using a sample of 1039 points from all over North America, in which he was able to determine that some projectile point types that were previously thought to be distinct were, in fact, the same. Meltzer was also, in some cases, better able to define geographic distributions of specific projectile point types through the data collected in his survey. It was not until the late 1980s that current PIDBA project director David Anderson began his efforts to compile known instances of Paleoindian projectile points (n=9153 at the time of initial publication in 1990) in eastern North America, and founded the PIDBA project. Anderson would later be joined by Michael K. Faught in 1994, followed later by a host of other professional and advocational archaeologists, as well as graduate and undergraduate students, who have filled various roles ranging from primary data contribution and collection to data entry as PIDBA continued to develop and expand over the next twenty years into its current incarnation, which now includes primary data from across much of North America, including Canada and Mexico. Attempts to incorporate data from areas further to the south in Latin America have been initiated in recent years but remain limited at present.

== The Evolution of the Paleoindian Database of the Americas ==
The PIDBA database was originally developed to examine morphological variability and temporal placement of fluted point forms in North America. Since its inception in 1990 PIDBA has expanded considerably in the subsequent twenty years and now includes data collected from all over the Americas. The PIDBA website also now features radiometric and bibliographic databases, and color photos and line drawings of artifacts (when available), and has expanded beyond projectile points to include data on other related Paleoindian artifacts, including, but not limited to, scrapers, drills, flake tools, and the like. The site also features projectile point type distribution maps which were originally hand-shaded by county areas, but now uses a GIS interface in generating them. These maps have been configured to show temporally relevant data in relation to late Pleistocene environmental conditions and geography (i.e. ice sheet coverage, periglacial and pluvial lakes, shoreline elevation, etc.) and can be viewed separately by projectile point type (e.g. Clovis, Folsom, etc.). These conditions have been reconstructed from geology and research by other scientists on sources of Pleistocene environmental data like human coprolites, packrat middens, and ancient owl droppings.

Before the PIDBA website existed as the online database it is today it existed on a series of disks which were available and mailed out upon request. In 1999 an early version of the PIDBA website appeared, presenting the data collected to that point. Over the years the database has steadily grown in size and scope, as has the associated website. From its original database of 9,153 points in 1990, to 12,791 points by 2000, to some 30,000 points in 2010, the continued growth of PIDBA serves as an example of academic and public cooperation and scientific data sharing.

== Primary Data Collection and Compilation ==
The PIDBA site seeks to maintain the most up to date information relevant to Paleoindian assemblages, particularly those pertaining to projectile points. PIDBA is constantly being updated, with updates being released periodically through archaeology journals, conferences, and online. As new data becomes available the site is updated through the efforts of volunteers, many of them undergraduate and graduate students, who handle much of the data entry and digital conversion of hard copy files at universities around the country, such as University of Arizona, University of Tennessee, and Texas A&M. As of January 2010, approximately 100 professional and advocational archaeologists have made direct data contributions to PIDBA. Data from other sources, both published and unpublished, have been converted to digital format to be uploaded to the PIDBA site, either by primary contributors or by the volunteers who have assisted in the project over the years. The data posted on PIDBA appears with the consent of the original authors or researchers and copyrights are respected where applicable. Contributors can also expect to be acknowledged and referenced in the site's bibliography.

The PIDBA database is by no means complete. In furthering the goal of creating a more comprehensive database it is necessary to continually seek out new sources of primary data for inclusion. Many sources of primary data can be found in scientific journals, cultural resource management (CRM) reports, book chapters, private collections, fluted point surveys, or in unpublished materials such as master’s theses and doctoral dissertations. In many cases the associated primary data of published materials are only rarely presented in their entirety, are not always easily obtained via request, or may only be reported in local/regional publications or conferences. As one might imagine, locating and compiling these primary data sources can be a daunting task, something that makes the voluntary contributions of professional and advocational archaeologists--both in primary data submissions and tips on potential data sources--all the more important as new datasets cannot be included if their existence is not known. Researchers who are aware of the existence of primary data that is not currently on PIDBA are urged to submit it to one of the project directors, all of whom are listed in the website, and who can be reached via email.

== Potential Research Applications of PIDBA ==
The information contained within the PIDBA database has been used to explore a number of research questions. For example, by examining stylistic attributes on projectile points it is possible to recognize potential cultural boundaries spatially and through time. This allows the researcher to determine where different cultural occupations may have occurred and, through the examination of associated artifacts, what types of activities they were engaging in at specific sites and within geographic regions. This data can also be useful in determining how Paleoindians moved about the landscape and even how they came to be there in the first place (i.e. in determining migration routes). Examination of the data may also provide clues as to what and how morphologically distinct projectile point and other tool variants were used for and how they may have changed in form and function over time. Review of the data contained in PIDBA may also reveal potential biases in the database due to a lack of data, or lack of reporting, and can indicate areas where further study may be needed. The potential application for research is limited only by the available data and the insight and imagination of the researcher, with new possibilities opening up as more data is accumulated and new probabilities come to light.

== Selected Articles and Book Chapters ==
- The Paleoindian Colonization of Eastern North America: A View from the Southeastern United States. (David G. Anderson) 1990. In Early Paleoindian Economies of Eastern North America, edited by Kenneth Tankersley and Barry Isaac, pp. 163–216. Research in Economic Anthropology Supplement 5. Greenwich, Conn.: JAI Press
- A North American Paleoindian Projectile Point Database. (David G. Anderson) 1990. Current Research in the Pleistocene 7:67–69.
- North American Paleoindian Database—An Update. (Michael K. Faught, David G. Anderson, and Anne Gisiger) 1994. Current Research in the Pleistocene 11:32–35.
- The Distribution of Fluted Paleoindian Projectile Points: Update 1998. (David G. Anderson and Michael K. Faught) 1998. Archaeology of Eastern North America 26:163–187.
- Paleoindian Artifact Distributions: Evidence and Implications (David G. Anderson and Michael K. Faught) 2000. Antiquity 74:507-513.
- Paleoindian Database of the Americas: 2005 Status Report. (David G. Anderson, D. Shane Miller, Stephen J. Yerka, and Michael K. Faught) 2005. Current Research in the Pleistocene 22:91-92.
- Estimating Pleistocene Shorelines and Land Elevations for North America. (J. Christopher Gillam, David G. Anderson, Stephen J. Yerka, and D. Shane Miller) 2006. Current Research in the Pleistocene 23:185-187.
