= Pinson High School =

Former high school in Tennessee, USA

Pinson High School was a public high school in Pinson, Tennessee. Founded in 1873 by J. C. Wright, it had nearly 150 students within two years of its establishment. It was disestablished in 1956 with the formation of South Side High School from several local institutions.

The school's best-known alumnus was renowned country music singer Eddy Arnold, who played the guitar at school functions while attending Pinson. Arnold did not graduate, however—he dropped out to help his family with farm work.
