= Lake Graham (Tennessee) =

Reservoir in Tennessee

- Location within Tennessee Location within the United States
- Location: Jackson, Tennessee, United States
- Coordinates: 35°37′57″N 88°43′17″W
- Type: Reservoir
- Primary inflows: Brown's Creek
- Primary outflows: Brown's Creek
- Catchment area: 6,200 acres (2,500 ha)
- Managing agency: Tennessee Wildlife Resources Agency
- Built: 1981
- First flooded: December 16, 1982
- Surface area: 500 acres (200 ha)

Lake Graham (also Graham Lake) is a reservoir in Madison County, Tennessee 5 miles (8.0 km) east of the city of Jackson. It is primarily a recreational lake that also provides wetlands habitat to local wildlife and migratory birds. The lake is owned and managed by the Tennessee Wildlife Resources Agency (TWRA). The TWRA Region One offices are located at the lake, and it is the largest lake managed by the Agency. The lake is impounded by a 51 foot (16 m) high, 1,000 foot (300 m) long earthen dam with an uncontrolled spillway.

== History ==
The lake was first proposed in 1971, with Madison County Commissioner John Graham leading efforts to obtain the $2.8 million in federal, state, and county funds for the lake's construction. Originally known as Lake Madison, named after the county it is located in, it was informally referred to by commissioners as Lake Graham. In 1981, Governor Lamar Alexander ordered the dam across Brown's Creek closed during a ceremony at the construction site.

In July 1982, the Madison County commission officially recommended the lake be renamed to Lake Graham, which was denied by the Tennessee Wildlife Resources Commission. By September of that year, the Tennessee Wildlife Resources Commission reached an agreement to name it after Graham. Graham was at that time a member of the commission and was against the renaming to avoid appearances of favoritism, but dropped his opposition when it was agreed to name the road leading to the lake after Sen. Lowell Thomas, another supporter of the project, and when the renaming received the support of a number of state senators and representatives.

The lake was projected to be opened in early 1983. By late 1982, the projected date had been revised to on-or-about January 1, 1983. Significant rain in early December 1982 caused a rapid rise in the lake's level, and by December 16, 1982 the water had crested the spillway and the lake was declared filled and open.

== Ecology ==
The primary purpose of the lake was to provide a habitat for sport fishing near Jackson, though the history of the fish population in the lake has been troubled. In 1981, while the lake was still filling and before fishing was allowed, a group of individuals illegally stocked crappie in the lake. The species then exploded, out-competing other species due to the unbalanced, unnaturally large numbers of fish added to the lake. In 1989, the TWRA began the process of lowering the water levels in the lake to concentrate the prey species to allow for predation by other fish, such as bass and catfish. These efforts were only partly successful, though, and later the TWRA was forced to conduct a large scale fish kill to bring populations under control. By the early 1990s, crappie populations had decreased to unacceptably low levels, and re-stocking programs were started.

== See also ==
List of lakes in Tennessee
