= Five Points, Madison County, Tennessee =

Five Points, Tennessee
- Unincorporated community
- Location within Tennessee Location within the United States
- Coordinates: 35°31′06″N 88°39′59″W
- Country: United States
- State: Tennessee
- County: Madison
- Elevation: 430 ft (130 m)
- Time zone: UTC-6 (Central (CST))
  - Summer (DST): UTC-5 (CDT)
- Area code: 731
- GNIS feature ID: 1284347

Five Points is an unincorporated community in Madison County, Tennessee, United States. Five Points is located on Tennessee State Route 197 10.6 miles (17.1 km) southeast of Jackson.
