= Tennessee Wildlife Resources Agency =

Conservation agency in the United States

- Abbreviation: TWRA

Agency overview
- Formed: 1974
- Preceding agency: Tennessee Game and Fish Commission
- Employees: 600+
- Annual budget: 85.6 million USD

Jurisdictional structure
- Operations jurisdiction: Tennessee, United States
- Legal jurisdiction: State of Tennessee
- Governing body: Tennessee Wildlife Resources Commission

Operational structure
- Headquarters: Ellington Agricultural Center, Nashville, Tennessee
- Agency executives: Bill Lee, Governor of Tennessee; Jason Maxedon, Executive Director
- Regions: I (Jackson), II (Nashville), III (Crossville) and IV (Morristown)

Facilities
- Patrol cars: GMC, Ford and Dodge Light trucks and SUVs
- Boats: Various patrol and utility craft
- Observations: Partenavia P.68 Observer 2

Website
- http://www.tennessee.gov/twra

The Tennessee Wildlife Resources Agency (TWRA) is an independent state agency of the state of Tennessee with the mission of managing the state's fish and wildlife and their habitats, as well as responsibility for all wildlife-related law enforcement activities. The agency also has responsibility for fostering the safe use of the state's waters through a program of law enforcement, education, and access.

The TWRA is engaged in hunter education and training through the Tennessee Hunter Education Program, provides support to the "Archery in the Schools Program," and gives financial support to safety and competitive shooting programs through the Tennessee Wildlife Federation's Tennessee Scholastic Clay Target Program.

== History ==
Prior to 1949, when the Tennessee Game and Fish Commission was established, wildlife law enforcement efforts were piecemeal and largely left to local sheriffs and police. In the years leading up to its establishment, there was only one wildlife officer in the state, and in all but the most egregious circumstances, laws and hunting seasons were generally ignored. In January 1974, the Game and Fish Commission was reorganized, renaming the governing body as the Tennessee Wildlife Resources Commission and recommending that the Tennessee General Assembly authorize the creation of the Tennessee Wildlife Resources Agency as the law enforcement body reporting to the Commission and establishing the regional structure that it retains to this day. By the end of the month, legislation had been introduced in the General Assembly to execute these changes.

== Organization ==
=== Tennessee Fish and Wildlife Commission ===
The TWRA is governed by the 13-member Tennessee Wildlife Resources Commission, whose members are citizens appointed by the governor, the speaker of the state house, and the speaker of the state senate.

=== Regions ===
The state is divided into four administrative regions, each containing two law enforcement districts. Regions are headed by a Law Enforcement Major, as well as fisheries and wildlife program managers. Districts are headed by Law Enforcement Captains. Each county in the state is assigned at least one uniformed TWRA officer.

==== Region 1 ====
Region 1 is headquartered in offices on Lake Graham outside of Jackson, Tennessee, and covers all of West Tennessee plus four counties along the Tennessee River in Middle Tennessee. It is subdivided into law enforcement districts 11 and 12.

==== Region 2 ====
Region 2 is headquartered in offices at the Ellington Agricultural Center in Nashville, Tennessee. It covers most of Middle Tennessee except for the four counties straddling the northern part of the Tennessee River near West Tennessee and the counties along the Cumberland Plateau. It is subdivided into districts 21 and 22.

==== Region 3 ====
Region 3 is headquartered in an industrial development north of downtown Crossville, Tennessee. It covers most of the counties in Tennessee along the Cumberland Plateau and in southern East Tennessee. It is subdivided into districts 31 and 32.

==== Region 4 ====
Region 4 is headquartered in Morristown, Tennessee in offices located along Cherokee Reservoir. It covers most of the counties of northeastern East Tennessee and is divided into districts 41 and 42.

=== Officer rank structure ===
TWRA law enforcement officers are divided into a rank system similar to that of many law enforcement agencies, adopting the names and insignia of some ranks in the United States military. Majors are placed in charge of law enforcement activities within TWRA regions, assisted by a Lieutenant. Captains are in charge of law enforcement activities within TWRA districts.

== Law enforcement ==
Today, TWRA officers are tasked with enforcing state and federal game and non-game wildlife regulations, including hunting, fishing and trapping. The TWRA is also responsible for enforcing all boating laws (such as patrolling for intoxicated boaters, checking for correct boat registration, and enforcement of safety regulations) and maintaining public boat access areas.

Although TWRA officers concentrate on wildlife-related law enforcement and rarely are called to enforce other laws, they carry both state-level commissions and commissions granted by the federal government, giving them the ability and responsibility to enforce all state, local, and federal codes.

=== Forensics ===
The TWRA maintains a modern forensics laboratory at the University of Tennessee, Martin that includes state of the art DNA analysis equipment.

=== Homeland security and disaster response ===
TWRA officers are often called to provide assistance in search and rescue operations, due to their extensive experience working in woodland environments. TWRA K-9 units are utilized during missing persons situations in rural or wild areas within the state. TWRA officers also are included in Department of Homeland Security training as first responders and anti-terrorism enforcement officials. TWRA officers were sent to the Gulf Coast to provide assistance to local law enforcement and rescue teams in the aftermath of Hurricane Katrina.

=== Support programs ===
In addition to traditional law enforcement, the TWRA maintains Honor Guard and Chaplain programs. The TWRA Honor Guard takes part in ceremonial services such as presenting the colors and funeral services for active or retired officers. In 2014, the TWRA formed a chaplaincy program to support the spiritual needs of its commissioned law enforcement officers and promote resiliency among those placed in high-stress situations. It is designed as a voluntary, peer-supported program to provide trained chaplains to respond to traumatic incidents and assist in next-of-kin notification.

== Conservation ==
=== Wildlife reintroduction ===
The TWRA takes an active role in wildlife and fisheries conservation and the reintroduction of wildlife that were driven from an area due to human intervention. Reintroduction programs conducted by the TWRA and its predecessor agencies include for white tailed deer, wild turkey, and elk. The state's first effort to reintroduce the turkey was conducted from 1935 to 1950. During this time period, nearly 6,000 birds were released. This effort was unsuccessful, with none surviving long enough to establish viable flocks. However, a second, concentrated effort was made in the mid 1990s. In 1998, biologists with the agency declared the turkey reintroduction program complete.

=== Wildlife management areas ===
Wildlife Management Areas (WMAs) are publicly managed protected lands set aside for wildlife conservation and recreation, including camping, hiking, horseback riding, hunting, and fishing. TWRA manages over 1.5 million acres (6,100 km^{2}) spread across 123 WMAs statewide. Some WMAs are co-located with federally managed properties, such as Land Between the Lakes National Recreation Area and Cherokee National Forest.

== Education and public outreach ==
=== Tennessee Hunter Education Program ===
Since 1985, Tennessee has required completion of the Tennessee Hunter Education Program (THEP) as a prerequisite to obtaining a hunting permit in the state for all persons born on or after January 1, 1969. All hunters over the age of 10 are required to be in possession of a Hunter Education certificate while in the field, and those under 10 must be accompanied by an adult of at least 21 years of age who has completed the course and who must remain in a position to take immediate control of the hunting device.

The course is offered free of charge and consists of a minimum of 10 hours of classroom participation, although most courses generally last 12–16 hours. Students are then required to successfully pass a written examination and a live firing exercise. The course contains instruction on ethics, marksmanship, history of hunting and firearms, wildlife management and identification, laws, knowledge of firearms and ammunition, wilderness survival, emergency first aid, etc.

The THEP was established as a formal hunter education program in 1975. According to the TWRA, since its institution, hunting and firearm related accidents in Tennessee have declined dramatically. Hunter safety certification via the THEP is recognized by all states, Canada, and Mexico.

=== Tennessee Scholastic Clay Target Program ===
In 2001, the TWRA partnered with the National Shooting Sports Foundation and the Tennessee Wildlife Federation to institute the Tennessee Scholastic Clay Target Program. This program is designed to provide elementary- to college-aged students in Tennessee with opportunities to compete in clay target shooting sports with their peers across the state. These programs are usually organized as school-endorsed athletic programs, however teams are also organized through 4-H clubs, Boy and Girl Scout Troops, or community groups. The program draws over 1,000 youth annually to the state championships.

=== Tennessee Wildlife magazine ===
As part of its public outreach and education efforts, the TWRA publishes Tennessee Wildlife magazine. Published quarterly, the magazine focuses on seasonal content with subjects relating to wildlife management and conservation, hunting, fishing, and outdoor recreation. Agency personnel author numerous articles alongside free-lance pieces submitted by the public.

== See also ==
- List of law enforcement agencies in Tennessee
- List of state and territorial fish and wildlife management agencies in the United States
