= Richard B. Russell Multiple Resource Area =

The Richard B. Russell Dam and Lake are located on the upper portion of the Savannah River drainage and its tributaries in Georgia and South Carolina. Many reservoirs were constructed in the southeast during the twentieth century, and archaeological investigations were conducted in many of them. The Richard B. Russell Dam and Lake are named after former U.S. Senator Richard Brevard Russell, Jr. From 1969 to 1985, numerous cultural resource investigations were undertaken in the reservoir also known as the Richard B. Russell Dam and Lake and the Richard B. Russell Multiple Resource Area. The work in the reservoir documented human occupation from the Paleoindian period all the way through to Historic Period.

== Site ==
The projected area encompassed a total of 52,000 acres, much of which witnessed was surveyed by archaeologist in the late 1960s and 1970s. About half of that the project area 26,650 acres, was located in the floodpool and the remainder was in the adjoining public use lands and was less intensively examined. The reservoir was the last undammed section of the Savannah above the fall line, and was flooded between 1983 and 1984. The construction of the reservoir lead to many historic investigations under Section 106 of the National Historic Preservation Act. A synthesis of the archaeological investigations was produced in 1988 by David G. Anderson and J. W. Joseph.

== Archaeological findings ==
There were some 730 historic and prehistoric sites located in the reservoir. Many of the sites were found through intensive survey of approximately 5,400 hectares while there were larger excavations at around 30 locations. These 30 sites were chosen for a more intense examination after consulting with the Georgia and South Carolina State Historic Preservation offices.

== Key sites ==
There were many important historic and prehistoric archaeological sites that were discovered in the Richard B. Russell Reservoir that helped give us a better understanding of when the initial inhabitants arrived, and about the different types of traditions that were located there. Some of these sites include:

Prehistoric sites

- Rucker's Bottom (9EB91)
- Simpson's Field (38AN8)
- Clyde Gulley (9EB387)
- (9EB17) (Transect 21)
- Gregg Shoals (9EB259)
- McCalla Bottoms (38AB288)
- Sara's Ridge (38AN29)
- Big Generostee Creek (38AN126)
- Beaverdam Creek Borrow Pit (9EB19)
- Rufus Bullard (9EB76)
- (38AB387)
- (9EB92)
- (9EB219)
- Paris Island South (9EB21)
- Rocky River (38AB91)
- Harper's Ferry (38AB22)
- Beaverdam Creek Mound (9EB85)
- Beaverdam Creek Site Group

(9EB92, 9EB207, 9EB208, 9EB219)

- Van Creek (9EB382)

Historic sites

- Fort Independence
- Millwood Plantation
- Allen Plantation
- Thomas B. Clinkscales Farm
- Seven Historic Mill Sites

== Selected Books and Monographs ==
- Prehistory and History Along the Upper Savannah River: Technical Synthesis of Cultural Resource Investigations, Richard B. Russell Multiple Resource Area. 1988 (David G. Anderson and J.W. Joseph). National Park Service, Interagency Archeological Services-Atlanta, Russell Papers.
- Prehistoric Human Ecology Along the Upper Savannah River: Excavations at the Rucker's Bottom, Abbeville and Bullard Site Groups. 1985 (David G. Anderson and Joseph Schuldenrein, assemblers). National Park Service, Interagency Archaeological Services- Atlanta, Russell Papers.
- The Savannah River Chiefdoms: Political Change in the Late Prehistoric Southeast. (1994) University of Alabama Press.
- Richard B. Russell Multi-Resource Area Site Specific Mitigation Plan. 1980 (Victor A. Carbone) Atlanta Archeological Services Branch of the National Park Service.
- Testing and Data Recovery at Allen Plantation (38AB102) and Thomas B. Clinkscales Farm (38AB221), Richard B. Russell Multiple Resource Area, Abbeville County, South Carolina. 1982 (Leslie M. Ducker, Woody C. Meiszner, and James B. Legg). Carolina Archaeological Services Resource Study Series 55.1333.
- An Archaeological Investigation of the Bullard Group Sites 9EB76 and 9EB348, Richard B. Russell Multiple Resource Area, Elbert County, Georgia. 1980 (Lawrence L. Flint and Robert C. Suggs). Contract C-54044(80) Final Report, on file at the Atlanta Interagency Archaeological Services Division, National Park Service.
- Culture and Environment in the Richard B. Russell Reservoir: A Summary of Investigations Between 1979 and 1981. 1984 (William M. Gardner). Unpublished manuscript on file at Atlanta Archeological Services Branch, National Park Service.
- An Interpretive Overview of the Prehistory of Richard B. Russell Multiple Resource Area, Elbert and Hart Counties Georgia, and Abbeville and Anderson Counties, South Carolina. 1984 (William M. Gardner) Unpublished manuscript on file at Thunderbird Research Corporation, Front Royal, Virginia.
- Results of Archaeological Testing of Seventeen Sites in the Richard B. Russell Reservoir Region, South Carolina and Georgia. 1980 (William M. Gardner and William Barse). Unpublished manuscript on file with the Atlanta Interagency Archaeological Services Division, National Park Service.
- Results of Archaeological Reconnaissance and Testing of Previously Unsurveyed Floodplains and 35 Archaeological Sites in the Richard B. Russell Multiple Resource Area, Georgia and South Carolina. 1983 (William M. Gardner, Lauralee Rappleye, and William Barse). Unpublished manuscript on file with the Atlanta Interagency Archaeological Services Division, National Park Service.
- A Report of Archaeological Testing at Sites 38AB22, 39AB91, and 38AB288 in the Richard B. Russell Reservoir, Abbeville County, South Carolina. 1981 (W. Glander, G. Barber, and P. Brockington) Contract C-54051(81) Final Report, submitted to Interagency Archaeological Services Division, Atlanta.
- Testing and Evaluation of the 84 Sites and Reconnaissance of the Islands and Cleveland Property, Richard B. Russell Dam and Lake, Savannah River, Georgia and South Carolina. 1983 (Albert C. Goodyear, William Monteith, and Michael Harmon). Institute of Archeology and Anthropology, University of South Carolina, Research Manuscript Series 189.
- Archaeological Data Recovery at 38AB387 and 9EB368 Richard B. Russell Lake, Abbeville County, South Carolina and Elbert County, Georgia. 1986 (Thomas H. Gresham and Karen G. Wood). Final Contract DACW21- 86-M-0132 Report prepared for the U.S. Army Engineer District, Savannah Corps of Engineers.
- Archaeological Survey of the Trotter's Shoals Reservoir Area in South Carolina. 1970 (Thomas E. Hemmings) Institute of Archeology and Anthropology, University of South Carolina, Research Manuscript Series 3.
- Archaeological Survey of the Elbert County, Georgia, Portion of the Proposed Trotter's Shoals Reservoir, Savannah River. 1970 (Brooks Hutto) University of Georgia, Laboratory of Archaeology Series 7.
- The Beaverdam Creek Mound (9EB85), Elbert County, Georgia. 1976 (Chung H. Lee). Unpublished manuscript on file at Department of Anthropology, University of Georgia, Athens.
- Power Without Power: Afro American Culture History Survey and Evaluation Richard B. Russell Project. 1986 (Eleanor Ramsey, Patricia Turner, and Shirley Moore). Unpublished Manuscript of file at Atlanta Interagency Archeological Services Division, National Park Service.
- The Report of the Intensive Survey of the Richard B. Russell Dam and Lake, Savannah River, Georgia and South Carolina. 1978 (Richard L. Taylor and Marion F. Smith (editors)). Institute of Archaeology and Anthropology, University of South Carolina, Research Manuscript Series 142.
- An Archaeological Survey of Five Islands in the Savannah River: An Impact Assessment for the Richard B. Russell Reservoir Multiple Resource Area. 1983 (Timothy A. Thompson and William M. Gardner). Unpublished Manuscript on file at the Atlanta Archaeological Services Branch, National Park Service.
- An Archaeological Survey of Three Proposed County Road Relocations Anderson and Abbeville Counties, South Carolina. 1979 (Richard A. Warner and Jeanne Metropol). Savannah District, U.S. Army Corps of Engineers, Contract DACW 21-79-M-0440 Final Report.
- An Archaeological Survey of Six Proposed State Road Relocations, Anderson and Abbeville Counties, South Carolina. 1979a (Richard A.Warner, Steven Nicklas, Jenalee Muse, and Jeanne Metropol). Savannah District, U.S. Army Corps of Engineers, Contract DACW 21-79-M-0440 Final Report.
- 1979b An Intensive Archaeological Survey of Proposed Natural Gas Pipeline Relocation Richard B. Russell Reservoir Abbeville County, South Carolina. Savannah District, U.S. Army Corps of Engineers, Contract DACW 21-79-M-0440 Final Report.
- An Intensive Archaeological Survey of the Proposed AT&T Cable Relocation, Richard B. Russell Reservoir. 1979c (Richard A. Warner, David Babson, Jenalee Muse, and Jeanne Metropol). Savannah District, U.S. Army Corps of Engineers, Contract DACW 21-79-M-0631 Final Report.
- An Intensive Archaeological Survey of 57 Acres of Proposed Borrow Areas Proposed Seaboard Coast Line Railroad Relocation R-3, Richard B. Russell Reservoir. 1979d (Richard A. Warner, David Babson, Jenalee Muse, and Jeanne Metropol). Savannah District, U.S. Army Corps of Engineers, Contract DACW 21-79-M-0631 Final Report.
- An Intensive Archaeological Survey of the Proposed Borrow and Spoil Areas Elbert County, Georgia Road Relocations, Richard B. Russell Reservoir. 1979e (Richard A. Warner, David Babson, Jenalee Muse, and Jeanne Metropol). Savannah District, U.S. Army Corps of Engineers, Contract DACW 21-79-M-0631 Final Report.
- A Reassessment of Late Archaic Settlement and Subsistence Along the Upper Savannah River Valley: A View from the Richard B. Russell Reservoir. 1987 (Michael L. Alterman). Unpublished PhD Dissertation, Columbia University.
- Diet, Disease, and Culture: Evidence from Rucker's Bottom (9EB91), A Late Mississippian Site in Northeast Georgia. 1986. (Carol R. Butler). Unpublished M.A. Thesis. Department of Anthropology, Wake Forest University.
- Archaeological Survey of Elbert and Coldwater Creek Recreation Areas, Richard B. Russell Multiple Resource Area, Elbert County, Georgia. 1985 (Daniel T. Elliott, Dennis B. Blanton, and Paul Brockington Jr.). Submitted by Garrow and Associates, Inc. to Laubmann – Reed and Associates, Inc.
- Beneath These Waters: Archaeological and Historical Studies of 11,500 Years Along the Savannah River. 2nd edition. 1994 (Sharyn Kane and Richard Keeton). U.S. Army Corps of Engineers, Savannah District and Intragency Archeological Services Division, National Park Service—Southeast Region Atlanta, Georgia.
- Afro-American Culture History Survey and Evaluation, Richard B. Russell Multiple Resource Area, Elbert and Hart Counties, Georgia, and Abbeville and Anderson Counties, South Carolina. 1981 (Eleanor M. Ramsey). Cultural Resource Consultants. Contract Number CX 5000-1 -0993lSB 9 4 0 8 (a) 81 C586
- Archaeological Data Recovery in the Richard B. Russell Multiple Resource Area, the Anderson County Group, 38AN8, 38AN29 and 38AN126, Interim Report. 1981 (W. Dean Wood, ed.) Submitted to Archaeological Services Division, NPS, Southeast Regional Office and U.S. Army Corps of Engineers, Savannah Georgia.
- In Those Days: African American Life Near the Savannah River. 1994. (Sharyn Kane and Richard Keeton). U.S. Army Corps of Engineers, Savannah District and Interagency Archeological Services Division, National Park Service—Southeast Region, Atlanta, Georgia.

== Related papers ==
- Early Archaic Occupations in the Southeastern United States: A Case Study from the Savannah River Basin. 1988(David G. Anderson and Glen T. Hanson). American Antiquity 53:262–286.
- Reservoir Construction in the Southeastern United States: The Richard B. Russell Project as an Example of Exemplary Heritage/Cultural Resources Management. 2001 (David G. Anderson, Bennie C. Keel, John H. Jameson, James E. Cobb, and J.W. Joseph). MS.

== See also ==
- Stallings Island
