= Oakfield, Tennessee =

- Location within the state of Tennessee
- Coordinates: 35°43′13″N 88°46′13″W
- Country: United States
- State: Tennessee
- Counties: Madison
- Elevation: 446 ft (136 m)

Population (2021)
  - Total: 1,069
- Time zone: UTC-6 (CST)
  - Summer (DST): UTC-5 (CDT)
- ZIP code: 38362
- Area code: 731
- FIPS code: 47113

Oakfield is an unincorporated community in Madison County, Tennessee, which borders Jackson.

== History ==
Beginning in the late 19th century, Oakfield served as a station along the Illinois Central Railroad eight miles north of Jackson, and received both freight and passenger trains.
