= Phyllis Morse =

American archaeologist

Phyllis Morse (Anderson) (b. 1934) is an American archaeologist.

== Biography ==
Anderson was born in Chicago, Illinois in 1934, and attended Crystal Lake Community High, Crystal Lake, Illinois, graduating in June 1952. She became interested in archaeology while studying anthropology at the University of Michigan. In the 1950s there were fewer women at University, let alone any who chose that discipline. She received a BA in anthropology (with distinction) in June 1956 and an MA in anthropology in June 1958 both from Michigan.

Anderson was to meet her future husband, Dan F. Morse, because she was not allowed to be the sole woman in the field. She was, however, permitted to be the lab assistant for the Etowah site excavations in 1958 with Dan. They were recruited by Dr. James B. Griffin, their mentor at Michigan and the excavation was led by Lewis Larsen. As a married couple both doing archaeology throughout their careers, the Morses were nearly unique in the field of archaeology. Together, often with their three sons on the digs, they worked in many parts of the southeastern US. They spent thirty years in northeast Arkansas (1967–1997) at the Arkansas Archeological Survey’s Arkansas State University Survey Station in Jonesboro. The culmination of this work was their joint overview Archaeology of the Central Mississippi Valley. Through the 1970s and 1980s Phyllis Morse worked on research projects for the Arkansas Archaeological Survey, including at the Zebree site, taught at Arkansas State University and undertook museum consultancy work. In 1978 Phyllis Morse was awarded a research grant for work at the Parkin site, work that resulted in a 1981 monograph. She began Possum Antiques in 1979 and remains active in antique and book selling and was a member of the Arkansas Antique Dealers Association. She also served on the national board of the Midwest Tool Collectors Association, the Arkansas State board of the League of Women Voters, and was an exhibit consultant for the Memphis Pink Palace Museum and the Memphis Mud Island Museum.

== Key sites ==
- Parkin – this site in N.E. Arkansas is a Mississippian culture American Indian village. The style of settlement and the ceramic artifacts from the site are significant enough to name a phase. It is believed that the De Soto expedition visited the site in 1541.
- Zebree – a multi-disciplinary ‘salvage’ operation in Arkansas of an early Mississippian site undertaken between 1975 1968 and 1976 against a strict timetable and with limited resources. Phyllis A. Morse was the Laboratory Processing Supervisor and co-edited the final technical report.

== Influence and legacy ==
The esteem in which Dan and his wife Phyllis are held, is represented best by the collection of essays published for their retirement. The contributors wanted to honor their contribution to Arkansas archaeology. Mary Kwas, in the first chapter, chronicles their careers and includes statements of personal and professional testament that leaves no doubt of the breadth and depth of their work. Phyllis and Dan Morse received the Lifetime Achievement Award from the Southeastern Archaeological Conference in 2005.

Additionally, on retirement, the Quapaw tribe presented them with colorful tribal blankets in honor of the sensitive work that had been undertaken on their ancestors’ burial mounds.

== Selected publications ==
- Morse, Dan F. and Phyllis A Morse (eds) 1976 Zebree 1975: A Preliminary Report of the Zebree Project: New Approaches in Contract Archeology in Arkansas. Arkansas Archeological Survey Research Report No. 8.
- Morse, Dan F. and Phyllis A Morse 1980 Zebree Archeological Project. Final Report submitted to U.S. Army Corps of Engineers by Arkansas Archeological Survey
- Morse., Dan F. and Phyllis A. Morse 1983 Archaeology of the Central Mississippi Valley .New World Archaeological Record Series, Academic Press, New York.
- Morse. Dan F. and Phyllis A Morse 1960 A Preliminary Report on 9-Go-507: The Williams Site, Gordon Co., Georgia. Florida Anthropologist 13.8 1-99.
- Morse, Dan F. and Phyllis A Morse and Merril Emmons 1961 The Southern Cult, The Emmons Site, Fulton County, Illinois. Central States Archaeological .Journal 8: 124- 140.
- Morse Dan F. and Phyllis A., Morse and Dave Weimar 1962 The Detweiler Golf Course Site, Peoria, Illinois. Central States Archaeological Journal 9: 152- 158.
- Morse, Dan F. and Phyllis A. Morse 1964: 1962 Excavations at the Morse Site: A Red Ocher Cemetery in the Illinois Valley. Wisconsin Archeologist 45: 79-98.
- Morse Phyllis A., 1974 The 1974 University Field School in Archeology, Introduction. Arkansas Archeological Society Field Notes 1 12: 1-3.
- Morse Phyllis A. 1976 The first Arkansas Archeological Society. Arkansas Archeological Society Field Notes 142: 10.
- Morse Phyllis A. 1976 The New Archeology and old lab techniques: a complaint. Arkansas-Archeological Society Field Notes 139: 10.
- Morse Phyllis A. 1976 Archeological report on the Madison sewage project, city of Madison, Arkansas. Report submitted to Hilson and Sonnenburg, Consulting Engineers, Memphis by Arkansas Archeological Survey.
- Morse Phyllis A. 1976 A records search of the Archeological and Historic Information pertaining to the Upper Tyronza River Watershed Project, Arkansas. Report submitted to Soil Conservation Service, Little Rock by the Arkansas Archaeology Survey.
- Morse Phyllis A., David G. Anderson, Thomas E. Scheitlin, Michael G. Million, and Mary Lucus Powell 1980 Certain Laboratory and Analytic Procedures. In Excavation, Data Interpretation and Report on the Zebree Homestead Site, Mississippi County, Arkansas, edited by Dan D.Morse and Phyllis A. Morse, pp 9: 1-1 8. Arkansas Archeological Survey, Fayetteville. Submitted to US Army Corps of Engineers, Memphis District.
- Morse Phyllis A. 1981 A Cultural Resources Overview of the Jonesboro, Arkansas Area. Report submitted to McGoodwin Williams and Yates, Inc., Fayetteville, Arkansas by Arkansas Archeological Survey.
- Morse, Dan F. and Phyllis A. Morse 1986 Late Prehistoric Control of Critical Upland Resources in the Central Mississippi Valley USA. In The Social and Economic Contexts of Technological Change, organized by Sander van der Leeuw, and Robin Torrence, Ch. 3, pp. 1–13, The World Archaeological Congress, Southampton and London.
- Morse Phyllis A., David Anderson, Hazel R. Delcourt, Paul A. Delcourt, and John E. Foss 1989 Cultural Resource Investigations in the L'Anguille River Basin. Lee, St. Francis, Cross and Poinsett Counties, Arkansas. Garrow & Associates, Inc., Contract No.DACW66-87-C-0046. Final Report submitted to the Department of the Army, Memphis District, Corps of Engineers.
- Morse, Dan F. and Phyllis A. Morse 1989 The Rise of the Southeastern Ceremonial Complex in the Central Mississippi Valley. In The Southeastern Ceremonial Complex: Artifacts and Analysis, edited by Patricia Galloway, pp. 41–44. University of Nebraska Press.
- Morse, Phyllis A. and Dan F. Morse 1990 The Zebree Site: An Emerged Early Mississippian Expression in Northeast Arkansas. In The Mississippian Emergence, edited by Bruce D. Smith, pp 51–66. Smithsonian Institution Press.
- Morse Phyllis A. 1990 The Parkin Site and the Parkin Phase. In Towns and Temples Along the Mississippi, edited by David Dye and Cherly Cox, pp. 1 18-134. University of Alabama Press, Tuscaloosa and London.
- Morse Phyllis A. 1993 The Parkin Archeological Site and Its Role in Determining the Route of the de Soto Expedition, Chapter four in The Expedition of Hernando de Soto West of the Mississippi,1541–1543, edited by Gloria A. Young and Michael P. Hoffman. University of Arkansas Press.
- Morse, Dan F. and Morse Phyllis A. Dan F. Morse 1996 Changes in Interpretation in the Archaeology of the Central Mississippi Valley Since 1983, North American Archaeologist, 17(1): 1-35
- Morse Phyllis A. Dan F. Morse, Robert C. Mainfort Jr., Jami J. Lockhart, and Glen Akridge 1997 Provenience of Artifacts. In Sloan: A Paleoindian Dalton- Cemetery in Arkansas, by DanF. Morse, pp. 72–95, Smithsonian Institution Press, Washington and London.

== Sources ==
- Morse Phyllis A., 1981 Parkin: The 1978- 1979 Archeological investigations of a Cross County, Arkansas site. Arkansas Archeological Survey Research Series 13.
- Morse, Dan F. and Phyllis A Morse 1980 Zebree Archeological Project. Final Report submitted to U.S. Army Corps of Engineers by Arkansas Archeological Survey
- Mainfort Jr Robert C. and Marvin D Jeter (eds) 1999 Arkansas Archaeology: Essays in honor Honor of Dan and Phyllis Morse University of Arkansas Press, Fayetteville.
- Morse., Dan F. and Phyllis A. Morse 1983 Archaeology of the Central Mississippi Valley .New World Archaeological Record Series, Academic Press, New York.
