= Mifflin, Tennessee =

- Unincorporated community
- Location within Tennessee Location within the United States
- Coordinates: 35°33′10″N 88°34′48″W
- Country: United States
- State: Tennessee
- County: Chester
- Elevation: 486 ft (148 m)
- Time zone: UTC-6 (Central (CST))
  - Summer (DST): UTC-5 (CDT)
- ZIP code: 38340
- Area code: 731
- GNIS feature ID: 1293756

Mifflin is an unincorporated community in Chester County, Tennessee, United States.

== Geography ==
The community is situated on Tennessee State Route 200 and the eastern end of Tennessee State Route 197.

== History ==
Mifflin takes its name from Mifflin, Pennsylvania, the native home of a first settler. It is generally accepted that Mifflin was the first settlement in what is now known as Chester County. it was first settled about 1821 by Col John Purdy. Mifflin at that time was a part of Henderson County.

Mifflin is 16 miles from Jackson and 10 miles northeast of Henderson. Until after the Civil War, Mifflin was the largest town in present day Chester County.
