= Pinson, Tennessee =

- Unincorporated community
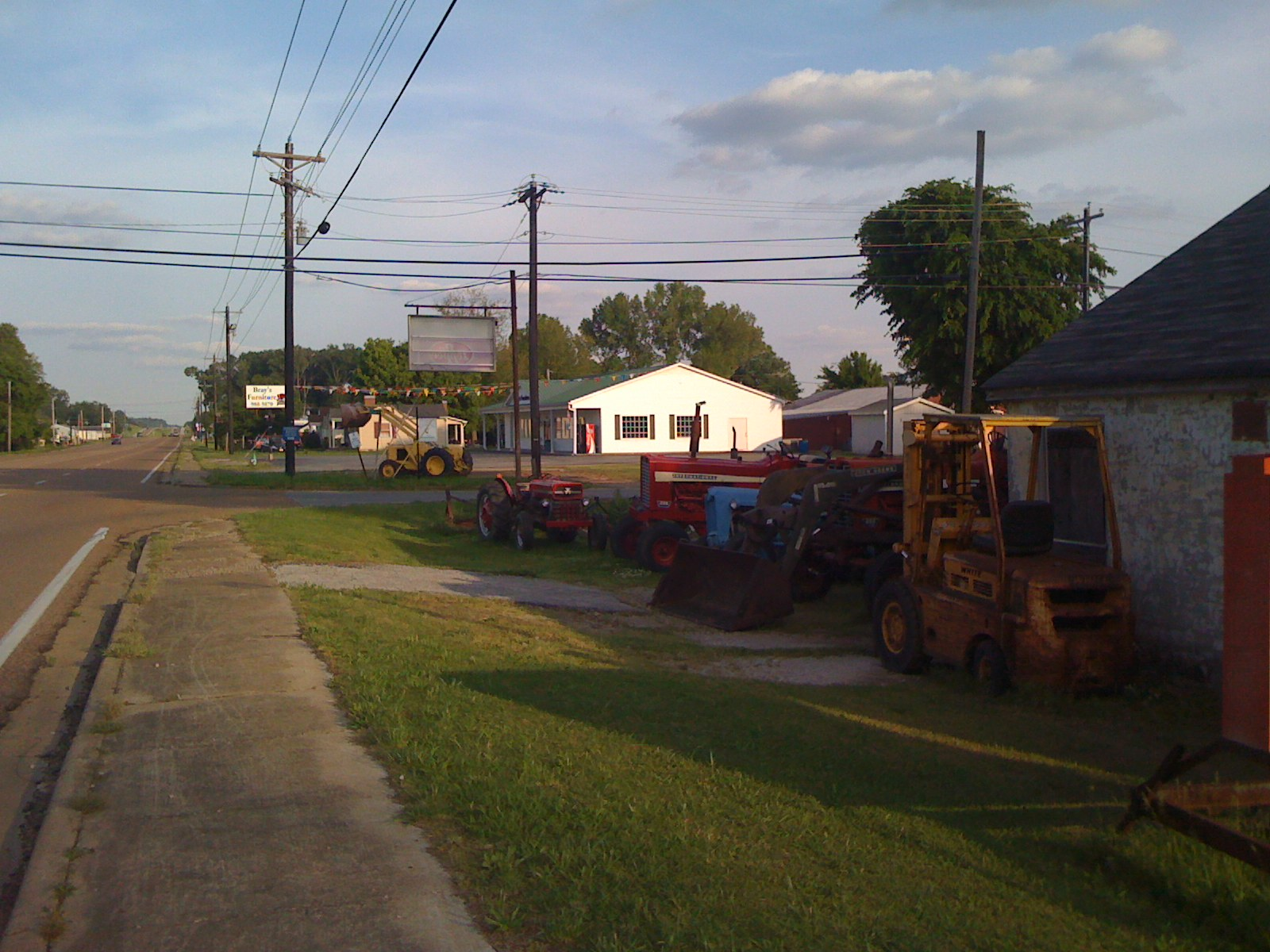
- Pinson's small commercial strip in 2008

- Location within Tennessee
- Coordinates: 35°29′24″N 88°43′14″W
- Country: United States
- State: Tennessee
- County: Madison

Area
  - Total: 4.08 sq mi (10.56 km^{2})
  - Land: 4.06 sq mi (10.52 km^{2})
  - Water: 0.015 sq mi (0.04 km^{2})
- Elevation: 381 ft (116 m)

Population (2020)
  - Total: 464
  - Density: 114.2/sq mi (44.11/km^{2})
- Time zone: UTC-6 (CST)
  - Summer (DST): UTC-5 (CDT)
- ZIP code: 38366
- Area code: 731
- FIPS code: 47-58780

Pinson is an unincorporated community in Madison County, Tennessee. It lies along U.S. Route 45 between Jackson and Henderson, just north of the Chester County line, and State Route 197 also passes through the community. It is included in the Jackson, Tennessee Metropolitan Statistical Area.

Pinson is the site of the Pinson Mounds, the largest Middle Woodland period Indian mound group in the United States, and the Pinson Mounds State Archaeological Park dedicated to their study.

== Demographics ==
Historical population
Census	Pop.	Note	%±
2020	464		—
U.S. Decennial Census

== History ==
In 1820, a group of five surveyors including Joel Pinson and Memucan Hunt Howard discovered a Middle Woodland period platform mound in the Pinson area while surveying land grants for Colonel Thomas Henderson. The surveyors dubbed the mound Mount Pinson after Joel, and a post office was established there under that name in 1827. In 1866, the post office was renamed "Pinson" with the foundation of the town of Pinson near the site of the mounds on land originally belonging to A. S. Rogers.

Pinson High School was established in the area in 1873, and by 1875 had a student body of nearly 150 scholars. Country music singer Eddy Arnold attended the school and performed locally during his early years. The institution endured until it was consolidated into South Side High School with several other area schools in 1956.

Damage to Pinson after an F5 on March 11, 1923

A destructive tornado struck Pinson on March 11, 1923, destroying 50 homes and killing at least 18 people. It has since been estimated that the tornado was an F5 on the Fujita scale based on damage reports.

== Pinson Mounds ==
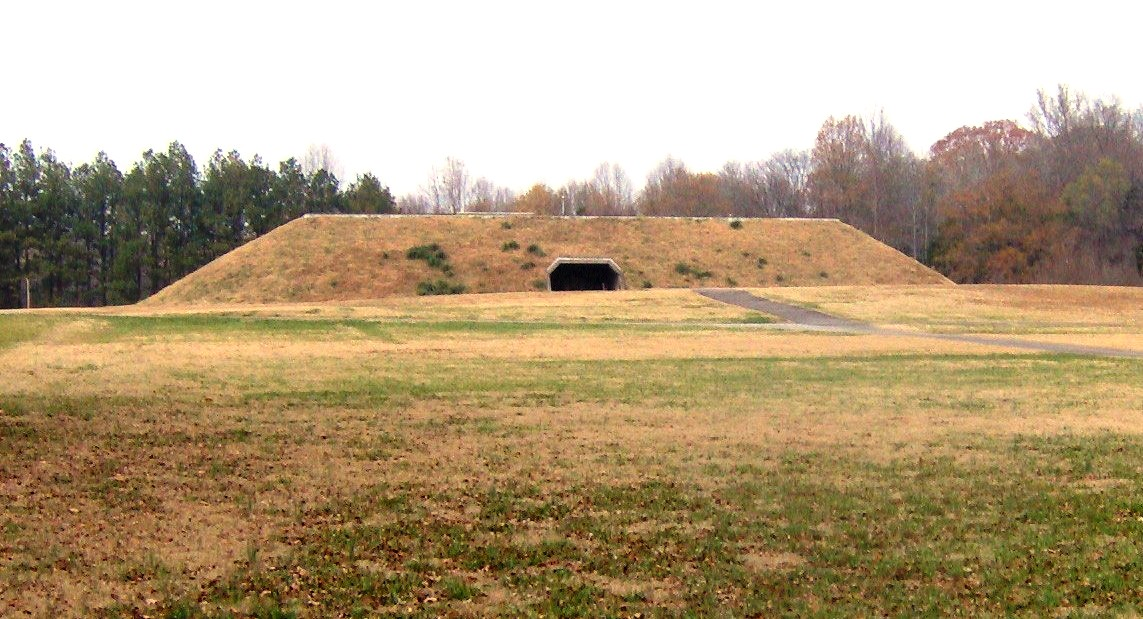
The Pinson Mounds Museum

Pinson is the site of the Pinson Mounds, an extensive archaeological area including three distinct mound groups of the Middle Woodland period. Covering 400 acres (1.6 km^{2}), the area contains at least 30 mounds, 17 of which have been identified as being completely or partially constructed by prehistoric peoples. They are located on an upland above the banks of the South Fork of the Forked Deer River, and are thought to have been originally constructed for religious ceremonial purposes.

The mounds were discovered by surveyor Joel Pinson in 1820 but remained of only local interest until Smithsonian archaeologist William Edward Myer mapped the site in the 1880s. It was officially made a Tennessee state park in 1974 after local citizens petitioned the state to purchase and preserve the land. The park, officially the Pinson Mounds State Archaeological Park, spans 1,200 acres (4.9 km^{2}) and is listed on the National Register of Historic Places.

== Notable people ==
- Eddy Arnold, country music singer that attended Pinson High School
