= Madison County, Tennessee =

County in Tennessee, United States

- County
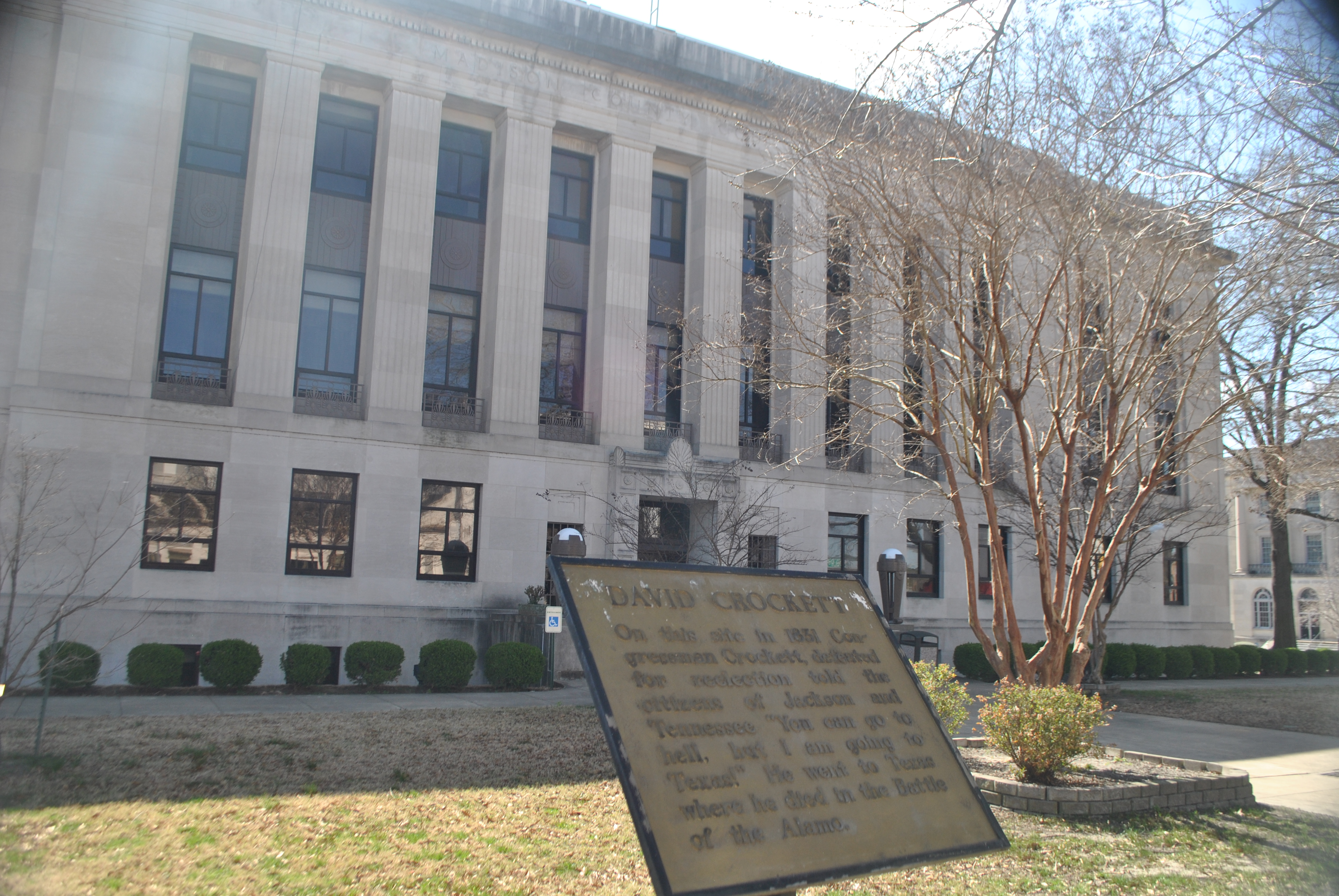
- Madison County Courthouse in March 2012

- Location within the U.S. state of Tennessee
- Coordinates: 35°37′N 88°50′W
- Country: United States
- State: Tennessee
- Founded: 1821
- Named for: James Madison
- Seat: Jackson
- Largest city: Jackson

Area
  - Total: 559 sq mi (1,450 km^{2})
  - Land: 557 sq mi (1,440 km^{2})
  - Water: 1.5 sq mi (3.9 km^{2}) 0.3%

Population (2020)
  - Total: 98,823
  - Estimate (2025): 100,790 ▲
  - Density: 177/sq mi (68.5/km^{2})
- Time zone: UTC−6 (Central)
  - Summer (DST): UTC−5 (CDT)
- Congressional district: 8th
- Website: www.madisoncountytn.gov

Madison County is a county located in the western part of the U.S. state of Tennessee. As of the 2020 census, the population was 98,823. Its county seat is Jackson. Madison County is included in the Jackson metropolitan area.

== History ==
Madison County was formed in 1821, and named for founding father and president, James Madison. The county was part of lands the United States purchased from the Chickasaw in 1818. After Congressional passage of the Indian Removal Act of 1830, most Chickasaw were forced out of the state and west to Indian Territory beyond the Mississippi River.

Pinson Mounds, one of the largest Woodland period (c. 1–500 CE) mound complexes in the United States, is located in Madison County. It has the second-tallest earthwork mound in the United States.

== Geography ==
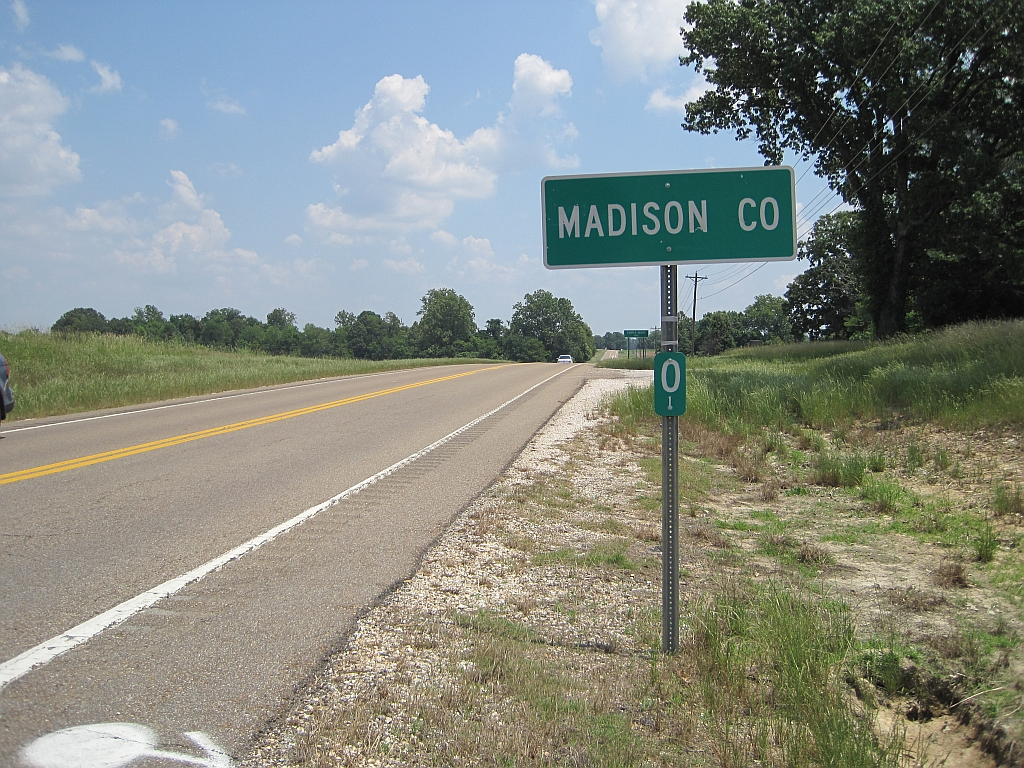

According to the U.S. Census Bureau, the county has a total area of 559 square miles (1,450 km^{2}), of which 557 square miles (1,440 km^{2}) is land and 1.5 square miles (3.9 km^{2}) (0.3%) is water.

=== Airport ===
McKellar-Sipes Regional Airport, renamed Jackson Regional Airport in 2025, ("MKL") serves the county and the surrounding communities. Lake Graham, a large 500 acre reservoir primarily intended for recreation and wildlife habitat, is located in the county 5 miles east of Jackson.

=== Adjacent counties ===
- Gibson County (north)
- Carroll County (northeast)
- Henderson County (east)
- Chester County (southeast)
- Hardeman County (south)
- Haywood County (west)
- Crockett County (northwest)

=== State protected areas ===
- Pinson Mounds State Archaeological Park
- Middle Fork Bottoms State Park
- South Fork Waterfowl Refuge
- Lake Graham

=== Highways ===
- US-45
- US-412
- US-70
- I-40

== Demographics ==
Historical population
Census	Pop.	Note	%±
1830	11,594		—
1840	16,530		42.6%
1850	21,470		29.9%
1860	21,535		0.3%
1870	23,480		9.0%
1880	30,874		31.5%
1890	30,497		−1.2%
1900	36,333		19.1%
1910	39,357		8.3%
1920	43,824		11.3%
1930	51,059		16.5%
1940	54,115		6.0%
1950	60,128		11.1%
1960	60,655		0.9%
1970	65,727		8.4%
1980	74,546		13.4%
1990	77,982		4.6%
2000	91,837		17.8%
2010	98,294		7.0%
2020	98,823		0.5%
2025 (est.)	100,790	▲	2.0%
U.S. Decennial Census; 1790–1960 1900–1990; 1990–2000 2010 2020

=== 2020 census ===
Madison County racial composition
Race	Num.	Perc.
White (non-Hispanic)	53,264	53.9%
Black or African American (non-Hispanic)	35,837	36.26%
Native American	175	0.18%
Asian	1,227	1.24%
Pacific Islander	13	0.01%
Other/Mixed	3,585	3.63%
Hispanic or Latino	4,722	4.78%

As of the 2020 census, there were 98,823 people, 39,515 households, and 25,748 families residing in the county.

The median age was 40.0 years. 21.8% of residents were under the age of 18 and 18.0% of residents were 65 years of age or older. For every 100 females there were 90.9 males, and for every 100 females age 18 and over there were 87.6 males age 18 and over.

As of the 2020 census, the racial makeup of the county was 54.9% White, 36.4% Black or African American, 0.3% American Indian and Alaska Native, 1.3% Asian, <0.1% Native Hawaiian and Pacific Islander, 2.6% from some other race, and 4.5% from two or more races. Hispanic or Latino residents of any race comprised 4.8% of the population.

73.7% of residents lived in urban areas, while 26.3% lived in rural areas.

There were 43,656 housing units, of which 9.5% were vacant. Among occupied housing units, 62.4% were owner-occupied and 37.6% were renter-occupied. The homeowner vacancy rate was 1.7% and the rental vacancy rate was 9.0%.

Of these households, 28.9% had children under the age of 18 living in them. Of all households, 41.9% were married-couple households, 18.4% were households with a male householder and no spouse or partner present, and 34.4% were households with a female householder and no spouse or partner present. About 29.9% of all households were made up of individuals and 12.1% had someone living alone who was 65 years of age or older.

=== 2000 census ===
As of the census of 2000, there were 91,837 people, 35,552 households, and 24,637 families residing in the county. The population density was 165 people per square mile (64 people/km^{2}). There were 38,205 housing units at an average density of 69 units per square mile (27/km^{2}). There were 35,552 households, out of which 33.50% had children under the age of 18 living with them, 49.80% were married couples living together, 15.90% had a female householder with no husband present, and 30.70% were non-families. 26.20% of all households were made up of individuals, and 9.30% had someone living alone who was 65 years of age or older. The average household size was 2.49 and the average family size was 3.00.

The racial makeup of the county was 65.20% non-Hispanic White or European American, 32.46% non-Hispanic Black or African American, 0.16% Native American, 0.63% Asian, 0.01% Pacific Islander, 0.67% from other races, and 0.86% from two or more races. 1.71% of the population were Hispanic or Latino of any race.

There were 35,552 households, out of which 33.50% had children under the age of 18 living with them, 49.80% were married couples living together, 15.90% had a female householder with no husband present, and 30.70% were non-families. 26.20% of all households were made up of individuals, and 9.30% had someone living alone who was 65 years of age or older. The average household size was 2.49 and the average family size was 3.00.

In the county, the population was spread out, with 25.80% under the age of 18, 11.00% from 18 to 24, 29.10% from 25 to 44, 21.70% from 45 to 64, and 12.30% who were 65 years of age or older. The median age was 35 years. For every 100 females, there were 92.10 males. For every 100 females age 18 and over, there were 87.20 males.

The median income for a household in the county was $36,982, and the median income for a family was $44,595. Males had a median income of $34,253 versus $23,729 for females. The per capita income for the county was $19,389. About 10.80% of families and 14.00% of the population were below the poverty line, including 18.40% of those under age 18 and 11.80% of those age 65 or over.

== Government and politics ==
Madison County was historically part of the Democratic stronghold in West Tennessee, but began shifting toward the Republican Party in the mid 20th century. Today, the county leans Republican in statewide and national elections, although Democrats remain competitive in Jackson, the county's largest city and urban center. The last Democrat to carry the county was Jimmy Carter in 1976.

United States presidential election results for Madison County, Tennessee
Year	Republican		Democratic		Third party(ies)	
Year	No.	%	No.	%	No.	%
1912	1,036	25.06%	2,702	65.36%	396	9.58%
1916	1,194	30.44%	2,659	67.78%	70	1.78%
1920	2,665	33.54%	5,280	66.46%	0	0.00%
1924	1,110	22.51%	3,422	69.40%	399	8.09%
1928	1,894	34.64%	3,574	65.36%	0	0.00%
1932	1,124	18.64%	4,813	79.83%	92	1.53%
1936	1,223	16.64%	6,095	82.93%	32	0.44%
1940	1,271	17.06%	6,154	82.63%	23	0.31%
1944	1,793	23.85%	5,706	75.91%	18	0.24%
1948	1,681	18.68%	4,722	52.48%	2,594	28.83%
1952	7,243	45.50%	8,623	54.17%	53	0.33%
1956	6,642	41.42%	8,540	53.25%	855	5.33%
1960	8,863	50.09%	8,083	45.68%	747	4.22%
1964	10,932	50.83%	10,573	49.17%	0	0.00%
1968	6,143	29.14%	5,517	26.17%	9,420	44.69%
1972	15,481	72.31%	5,203	24.30%	725	3.39%
1976	11,364	46.08%	12,989	52.67%	306	1.24%
1980	13,667	50.27%	12,986	47.77%	534	1.96%
1984	17,819	59.64%	12,006	40.18%	55	0.18%
1988	16,952	60.46%	11,001	39.23%	86	0.31%
1992	14,869	47.66%	13,629	43.69%	2,698	8.65%
1996	14,908	50.42%	13,577	45.92%	1,080	3.65%
2000	17,862	52.64%	15,781	46.51%	287	0.85%
2004	21,679	56.05%	16,840	43.54%	156	0.40%
2008	23,290	53.12%	20,209	46.09%	347	0.79%
2012	21,993	54.03%	18,367	45.13%	342	0.84%
2016	21,335	55.97%	15,448	40.52%	1,337	3.51%
2020	23,943	55.75%	18,390	42.82%	617	1.44%
2024	23,385	58.52%	16,115	40.32%	464	1.16%

The county is headed by an elected county mayor (currently A.J. Massey) and county commission of 25 members elected from 10 districts.

== Healthcare ==
West Tennessee Healthcare (Jackson-Madison County General Hospital District), created by a law passed by the Tennessee General Assembly in 1949, serves as the public hospital system of the county. The county appoints some of the members of the board of trustees.

== Media ==
This is the Madison County to which Kenny Rogers refers in his song "Reuben James".

== Communities ==
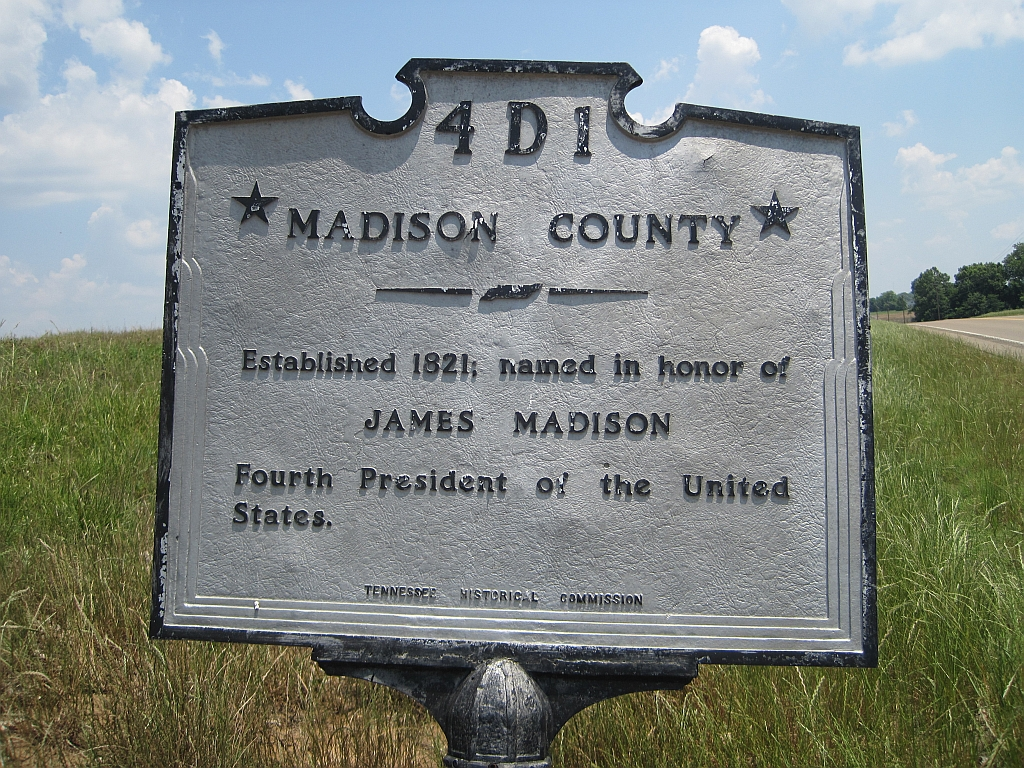

=== Cities ===
- Humboldt (mostly in Gibson County, Tennessee)
- Jackson (county seat and largest city)
- Medon (partially in Hardeman County, Tennessee)
- Three Way

=== Census-designated places ===
- Beech Bluff
- Mercer (partly in Haywood County, Tennessee)
- Pinson

=== Unincorporated communities ===
- Adair
- Beech Bluff
- Claybrook
- Denmark
- Five Points
- Huntersville
- Leighton
- Neely
- Oakfield
- Pinson
- Spring Creek

== Education ==
Jackson-Madison County School System is the public school district.

Lane College is a private historically Black college associated with the Christian Methodist Episcopal Church.

Union University is a private school affiliated with the Tennessee Baptist Convention.

West Tennessee School for the Deaf is a state-operated school in the county.

== See also ==
- National Register of Historic Places listings in Madison County, Tennessee
