= Beech Bluff, Tennessee =

- Unincorporated community
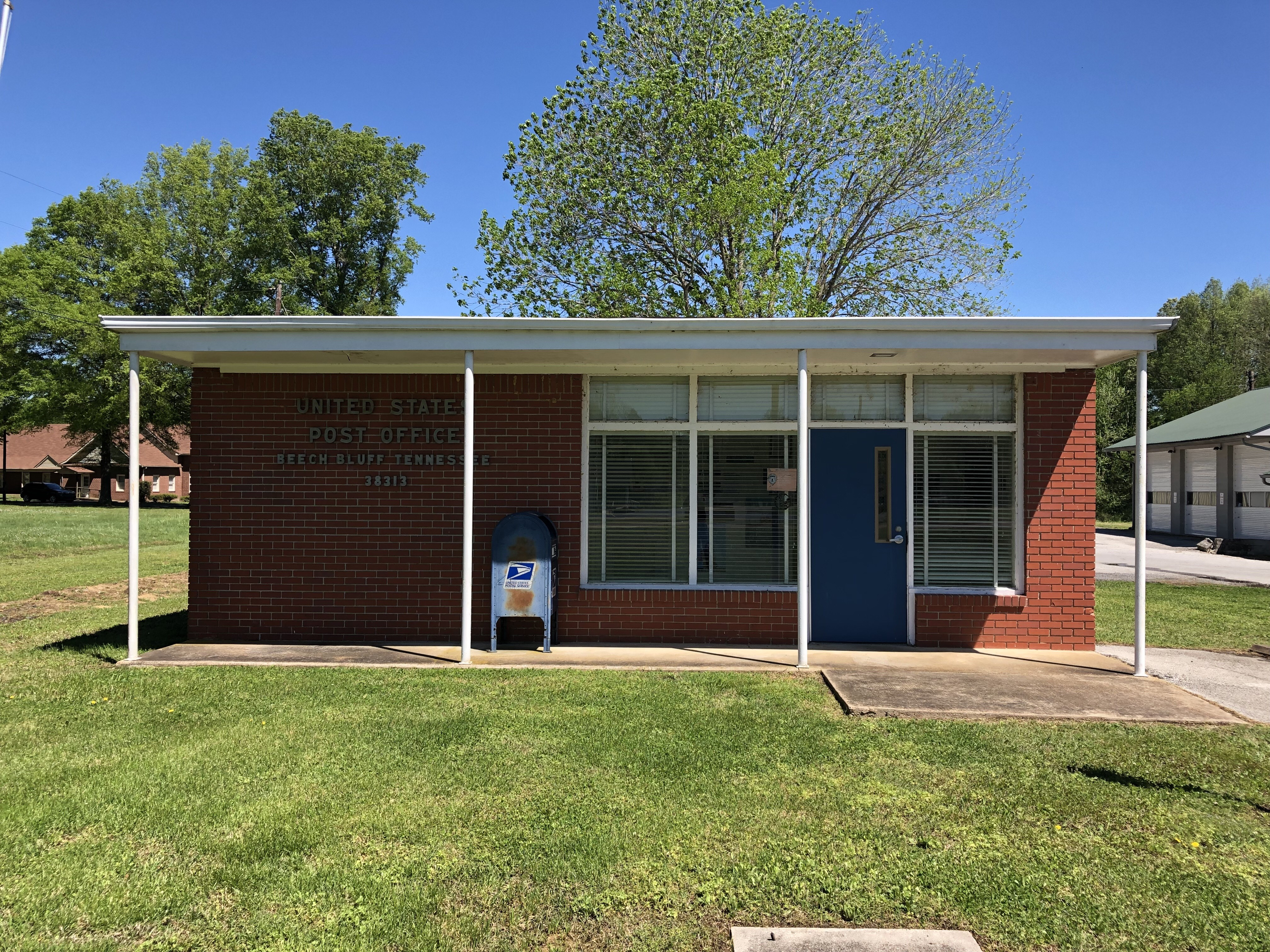
- Beech Bluff post office, 2019

- Location within Tennessee Location within the United States
- Coordinates: 35°35′47″N 88°37′53″W
- Country: United States
- State: Tennessee
- County: Madison

Area
  - Total: 4.40 sq mi (11.39 km^{2})
  - Land: 4.40 sq mi (11.39 km^{2})
  - Water: 0 sq mi (0.00 km^{2})
- Elevation: 384 ft (117 m)

Population (2020)
  - Total: 379
  - Density: 86.2/sq mi (33.29/km^{2})
- Time zone: UTC-6 (Central (CST))
  - Summer (DST): UTC-5 (CDT)
- ZIP code: 38313
- Area code: 731
- GNIS feature ID: 1305050

Beech Bluff is an unincorporated community on the east-central edge of Madison County, Tennessee, United States. The area ZIP code is 38313.

== History ==
The area which is now Beech Bluff was first inhabited by the Chickasaw, from whom an earthwork remains. In 1852, a post office was established at Beech Bluff, which was then also known as Homer (Note: Both names were in use in the nineteenth century. Higgins and Parish's Madison County has it that the community was known as Homer until the construction of the railroad, and Miller's Tennessee Place-names would seem to confirm this, but A New and Complete Gazetteer of the United States, published in 1854, nevertheless identifies a Beech Bluff post office in Madison County.) and used as a summer resort. After a section of the Tennessee Midland Railway was built through the area between 1888 and 1890, the name of the community was officially settled as Beech Bluff, derived from a large grove of native beech trees near a local bluff. By 1897, the population had grown to approximately three hundred. The community was historically home to a high school, founded as a one-room schoolhouse in 1885 and closed during desegregation in 1977. It later became a grade school called Beech Bluff Elementary before it was converted into a recreation center in 2016.

== Geography ==
Beech Bluff is built on deposits of loess which have developed brown or grayish brown silt loam soils. These are mapped as Grenada, Memphis or Lexington series where drainage is good, and Calloway in somewhat poorly drained areas.

== Demographics ==
Historical population
Census	Pop.	Note	%±
2020	379		—
U.S. Decennial Census
