= Pinson Mounds =

Archaeological park

Pinson Mounds State Archaeological Park
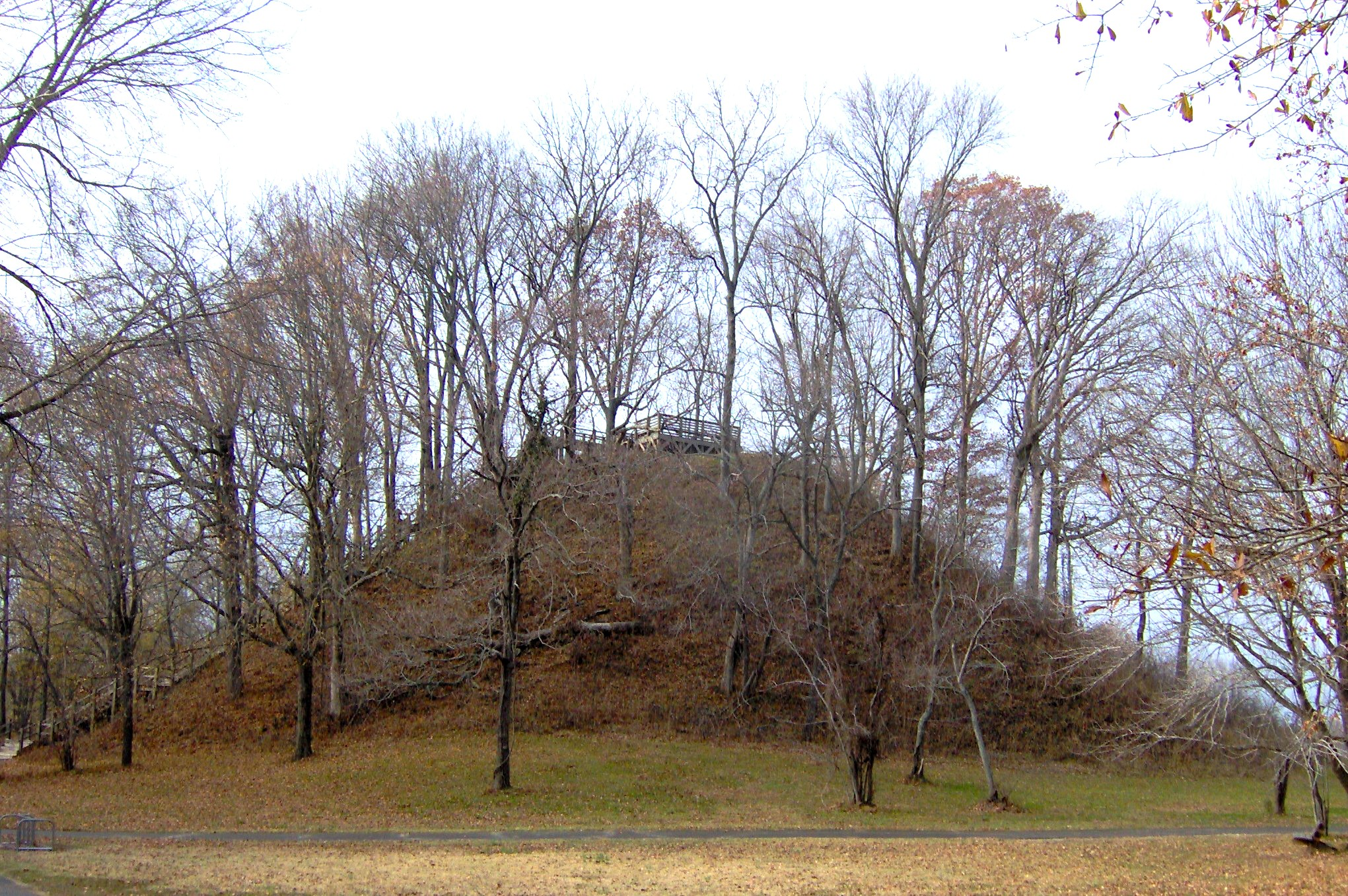
- Sauls' Mound (Mound 9) at the park
- Interactive map of Pinson Mounds State Archaeological Park
- Type: Tennessee State Park
- Location: Pinson, Tennessee
- Area: 1,200 acres (4.9 km^{2})
- Pinson Mounds
- U.S. National Register of Historic Places
- U.S. National Historic Landmark
- Location: Madison County, Tennessee
- Coordinates: 35°29′52″N 88°40′57″W
- Built: 0-499 AD
- Website: Pinson Mounds State Park
- NRHP reference No.: 66000727

Significant dates
- Added to NRHP: October 15, 1966
- Designated NHL: January 29, 1964

The Pinson Mounds comprise a prehistoric Native American complex located in Madison County, Tennessee, in the region that is known as the Eastern Woodlands. The complex, which includes 17 mounds, an earthen geometric enclosure, and numerous habitation areas, was most likely built during the Middle Woodland period (c. 1-500 AD). The complex is the largest group of Middle Woodland mounds in the United States. Sauls' Mound, at 72 feet (22 m), is the second-highest surviving mound in the United States.

The Pinson Mounds are now part of Pinson Mounds State Archaeological Park, one of two archaeological parks in Tennessee (the other being Old Stone Fort near Manchester). Pinson Mounds is a National Historic Landmark and is listed on the National Register of Historic Places.

== Geographic setting ==
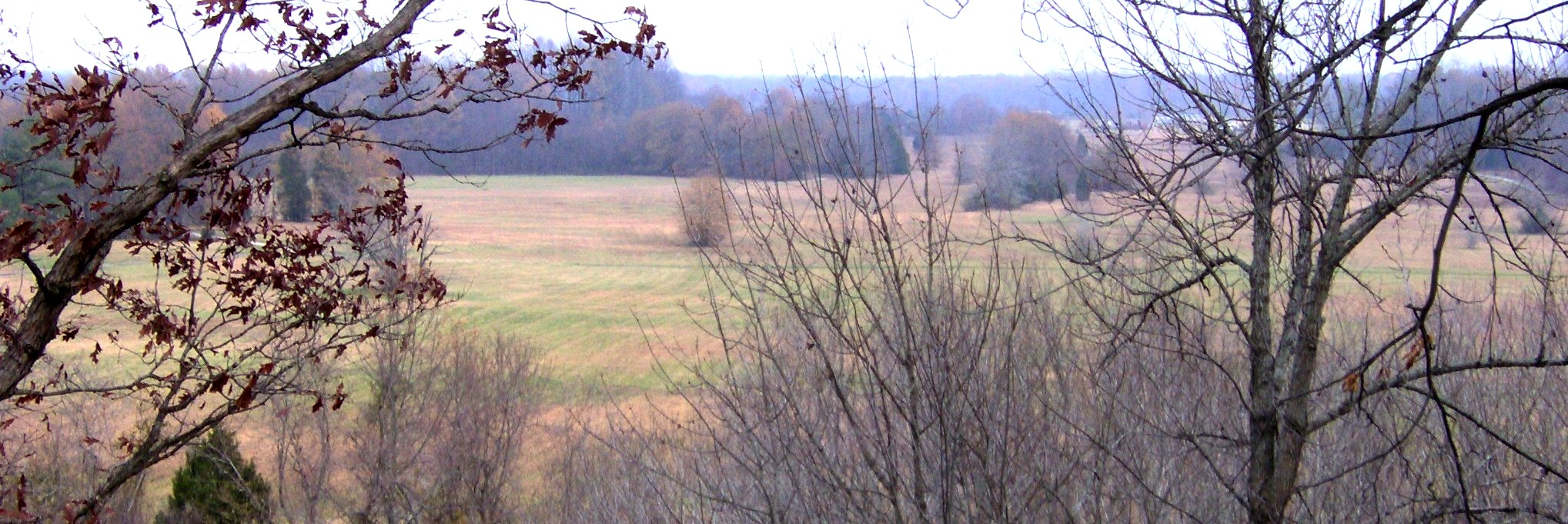
The view from atop Sauls' Mound, looking east

The Pinson Mounds are located on a plateau-like upland above the wetlands that line the banks of the South Fork of the Forked Deer River. The river and its wetlands form the complex's southern boundary. The Pinson Mounds are located amidst three distinctive biotic zones: the oak forests atop the plateau, the cypress forests in the wet bottomlands, and the beech forests on the slopes between the uplands and the bottomlands. The ground is mostly composed of Tertiary period rocks known for producing high-quality clay.

The mounds complex can be roughly divided into three sections— the Inner section, situated at the center of the complex around Saul's Mound, the Western (or Ozier) section, and the Eastern section, which includes the geometric enclosure. A stream known as Hudson Branch runs perpendicular to the Forked Deer River and divides the Inner section from the Western section. The Eastern and Western sections are both roughly 1,500 metres (4,900 ft) from the Inner section.

The Pinson Mounds complex is managed by the Tennessee Department of Environment and Conservation. The Western section is managed by the Tennessee Division of Forestry and includes a nursery and irrigation pond. Pinson Mounds State Archaeological Park is located appx. 2.5 miles (4.0 km) east of the town of Pinson and approximately 10 miles (16 km) southeast of Jackson.

== Archaeological features ==
The Pinson Mounds complex covers approximately 400 acres (1.6 km^{2}) and contains at least 30 mounds, 17 of which have been identified as being completely or partially constructed by prehistoric peoples. The mounds range in height from the prominent 72-foot (22 m) Saul's Mound to barely noticeable rises. Most mounds were probably constructed between 100 and 300 AD, based on radiocarbon dating and the predominance of Woodland-period artifacts found at the site. The following are major features at the Pinson Mounds site:

=== Inner Complex ===
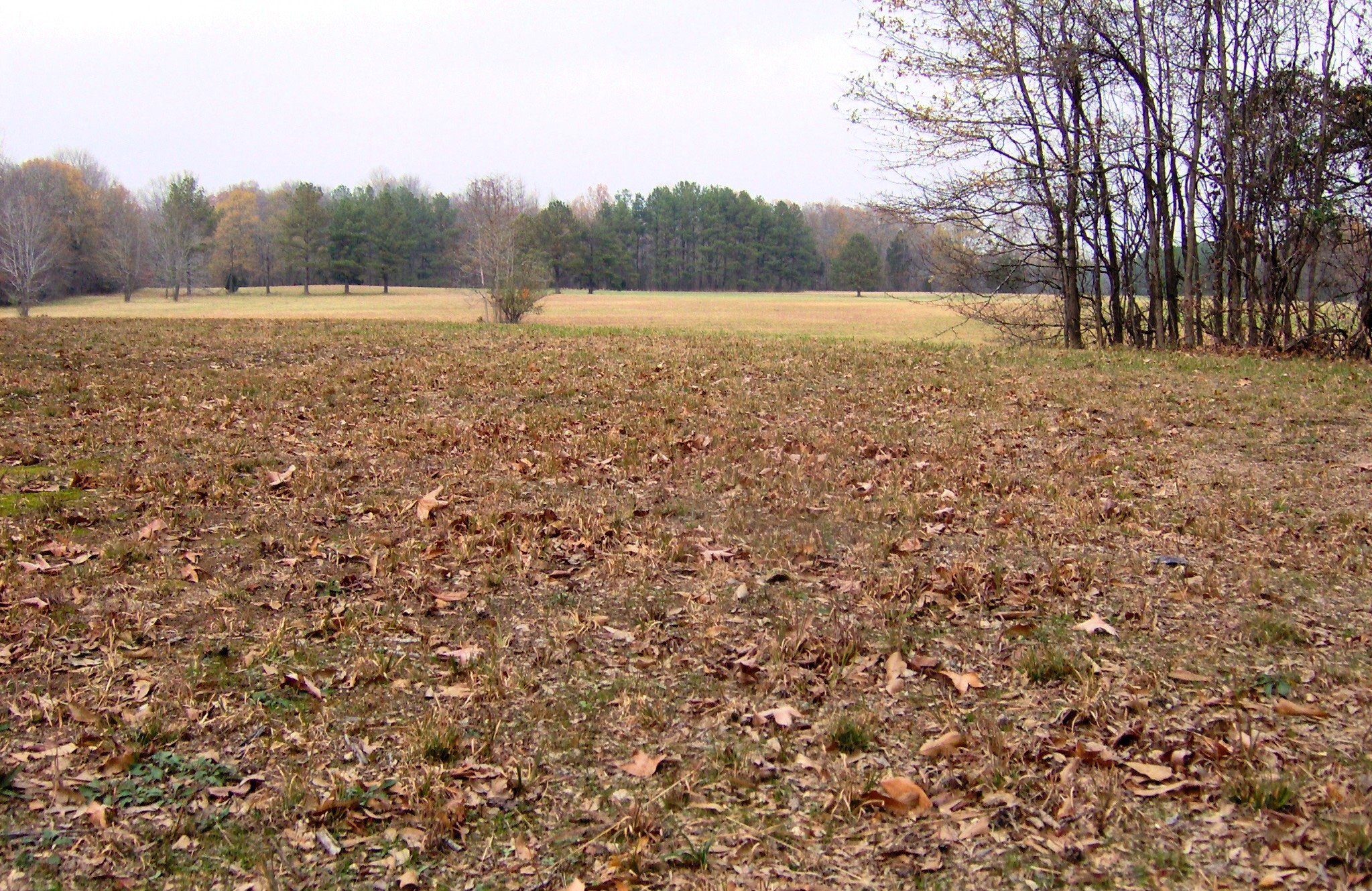
The view across the top of Mound 10 into a field below

- Sauls' Mound (Mound 9), at the center of the complex. The mound was named after John Sauls, the owner of the property before its purchase by the state. Sauls' Mound is the second-highest prehistoric mound in the United States. The mound is rectangular in formation, with each corner aligned with one of the four cardinal directions. The mound's function was believed to be ceremonial. A viewing platform has been constructed atop the mound for park visitors. Dimensions: base— 112 by 91 metres (367 ft × 299 ft), height— 22 metres (72 ft).
- Mound 10, a few meters to the east of Sauls' Mound. Mound 10 is believed to have been a platform mound with a ceremonial function. Dimensions: base— 61 by 40 metres (200 ft × 131 ft), height— 1.3 metres (4 ft 3 in).
- Mound 11 Sector, a few meters to the north of Sauls' Mound, behind the museum. Mound 11 is a natural rise that is believed to have been a habitation area during the Middle Woodland period.
- Mound 12, several meters southwest of Sauls' Mound. Mound 12 was a burial mound built upon an Early Woodland habitation area. Dimensions: base— 23 by 17 metres (75 ft × 56 ft), height— 1.3 metres (4 ft 3 in).
- Mound 14 Sector, several meters southwest of Sauls' Mound. The Mound 14 Sector was a late-Woodland/early-Mississippian habitation area.
- Mound 15, several hundred meters southwest of Sauls' Mound. Part of Mound 15 has been destroyed by cultivation. Dimensions: base— 46 by 50 metres (151 ft × 164 ft), height— appx. 1 metre (3 ft 3 in).
- Mound 17, several hundred meters southeast of Sauls' Mound. Dimensions: appx. 12 metres (39 ft) long with a height of 1 metre (3 ft 3 in).

=== Eastern Section ===
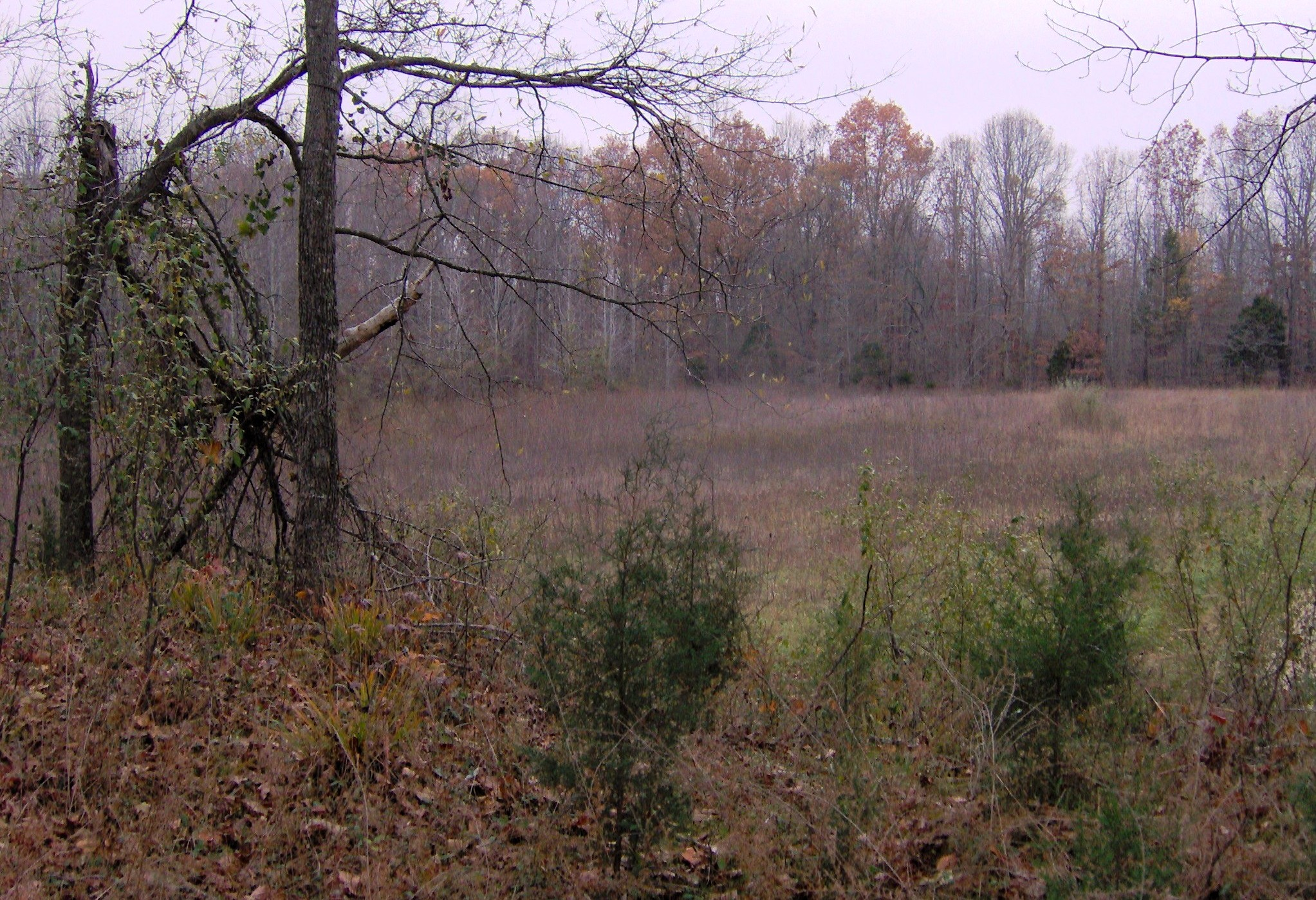
The view from atop Mound 29 into the area enclosed by the walls of the Eastern Citadel below

- The Eastern Citadel, an earthen geometric enclosure located approximately 1,500 metres (4,900 ft) east of Sauls' Mound. William Myer gave the enclosure its present name in the early 20th century, although archeologists believe its function to have been primarily ceremonial rather than defensive. The walls form a near-perfect semicircle with a diameter of 366 metres (1,201 ft), enclosing approximately 06 square kilometres (1,500 acres). The height of the walls is, on average, approximately 1.5 metres (4.9 ft). The enclosed area is not level, with the western edge being approximately 12 metres (39 ft) lower than the eastern edge.
- Mound 29, a rectangular platform mound located along the eastern edge of the geometric enclosure. Mound 29 is aligned with Sauls' Mound in the direction of the equinox sunrise. Dimensions: base— 49 by 52 metres (161 ft × 171 ft), height— 3.5 metres (11 ft).
- Mound 30, a bird-shaped mound a few meters south of Mound 29. The bird shape is thought to have been due to recent cultivation and subsequent erosion. Dimensions: approximately 24 metres (79 ft) long with a height 1 metre (3.3 ft).
- Mound 28, a rectangular platform mound located approximately 1,500 metres (4,900 ft) northeast of Sauls' Mound and several hundred meters north of the Eastern Citadel. Mound 28 is almost aligned with Sauls' Mound in the direction of the summer solstice sunrise. Dimensions: base— 62 by 65 metres (203 ft × 213 ft), height— 4 metres (13 ft).

=== Western (Ozier) Section ===
- The Ozier Mound (Mound 5), a rectangular platform mound with an earthen ramp facing northeast. At 33 feet (10 m), the Ozier Mound is the second-largest mound in the complex. Dimensions: approximately 80 metres (260 ft) in diameter, height of 10 metres (33 ft).
- The Twin Mounds (Mound 6), a double-conical mound located a few meters south of the Ozier Mound. The Twin Mounds were burial mounds. Base approximately 30 by 50 metres (98 ft × 164 ft).
- Mound 31, a burial mound located a few meters south of the Ozier Mound. Base appx. 40 by 60 metres (130 ft × 200 ft).
- The Cochran Area, a site located approximately 200 metres (660 ft) west of the Ozier Mound section. The Cochran Area is believed to have been a temporary habitation area. The Cochran area covers appx. 5,000 square metres (1.2 acres).

== Pinson Mounds in recorded history ==
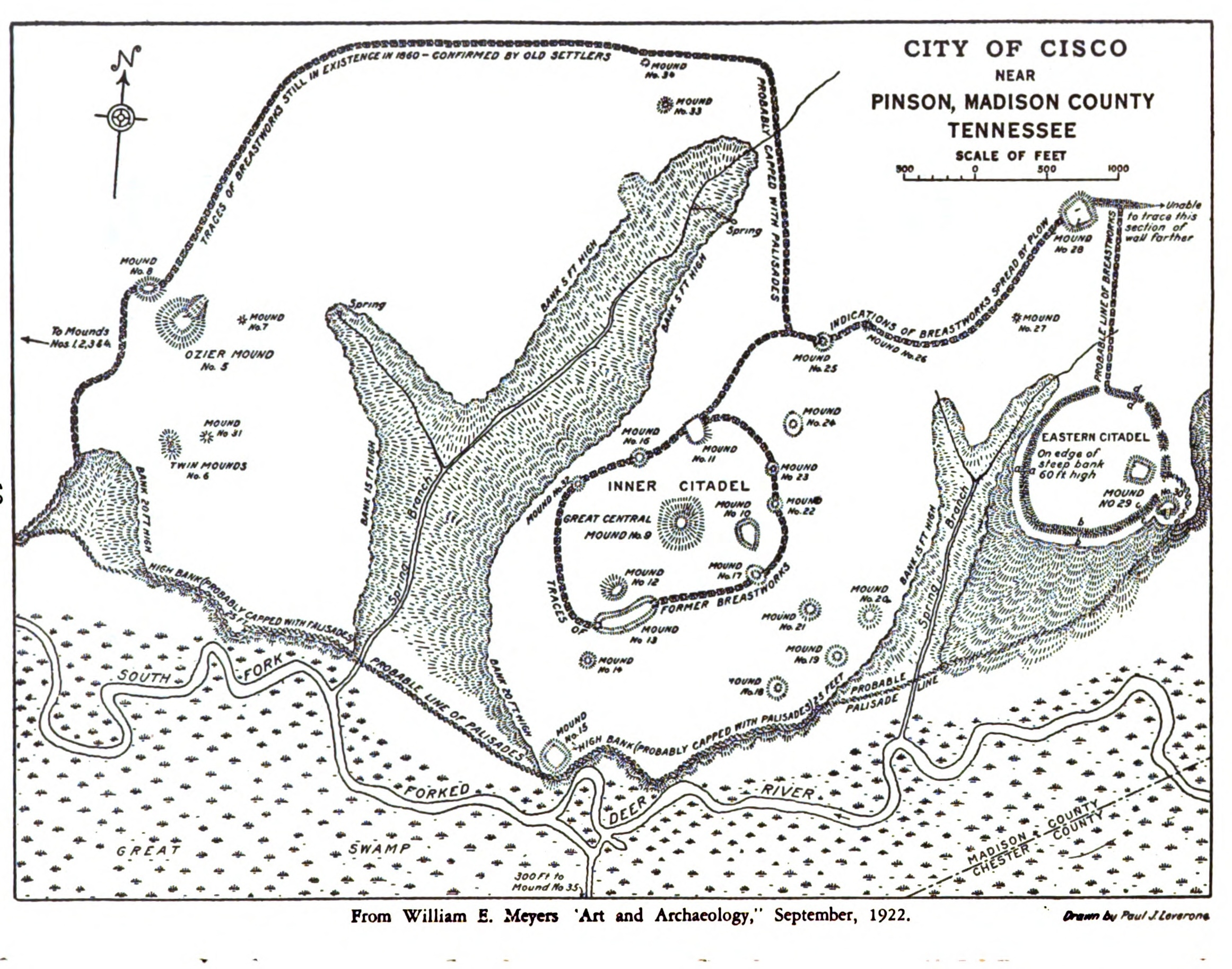
"City of Cisco" - Pinson Mounds - William E. Myer - September 1922

After the Chickasaw were forced from much of West Tennessee in 1818, land speculator Joel Pinson arrived in what is now Madison County to survey the area. Pinson "discovered" the complex which was named after him in 1820. The complex did not receive much attention until a Jackson-area journalist named J.G. Cisco began writing about it in the late 19th century. Cisco's articles drew the interest of the Smithsonian Institution.

In 1916 the Smithsonian dispatched the archaeologist William E. Myer to investigate the site. Myer suggested that the entire complex was built according to a master plan, and created a map for the site. In 1947, the Tennessee Division of Forestry purchased the Western section of the Pinson site.

=== Archaeological surveys and excavations ===
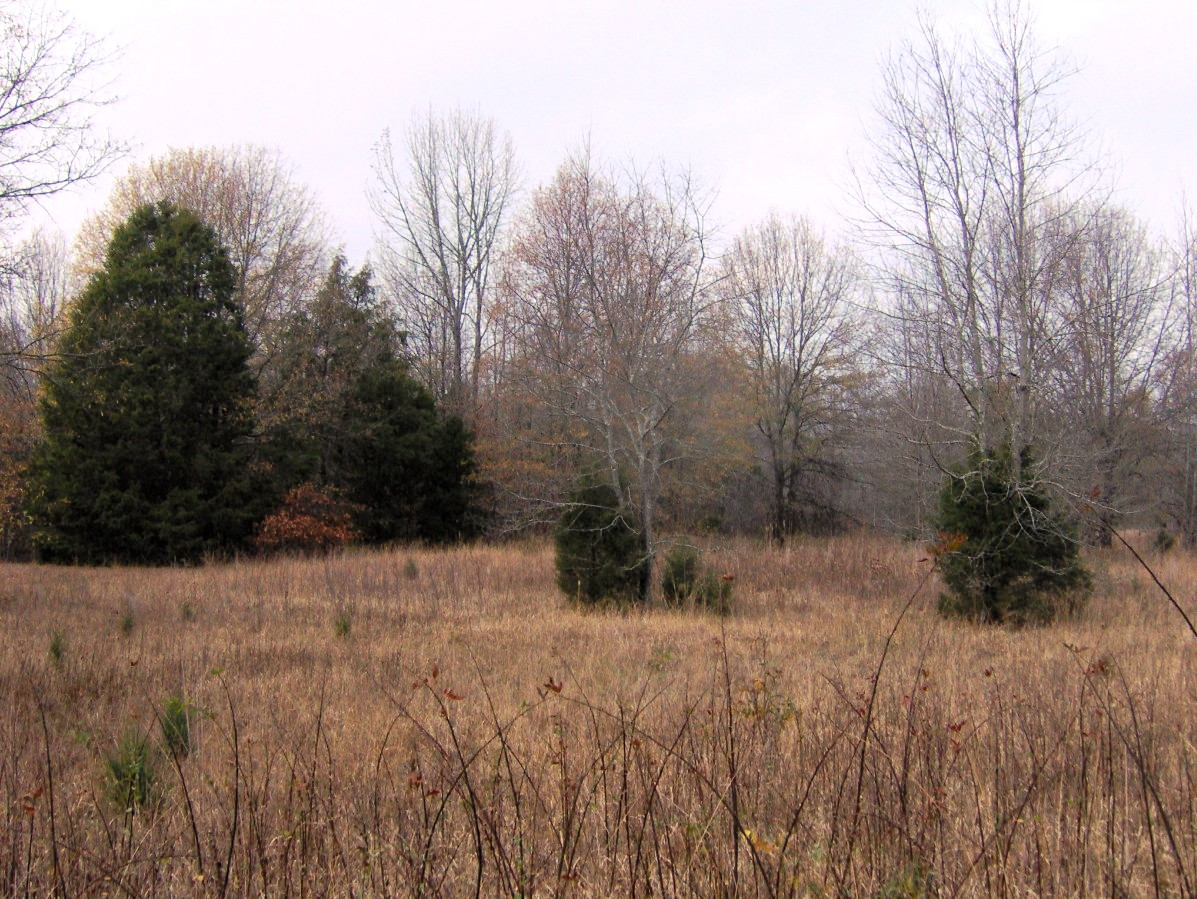
The Mound 14 Sector

At the request of the Jackson Archaeological Society and the National Park Service, in December 1961 the University of Tennessee archaeologists Fred Fisher and Charles McNutt carried out the first major excavation of the Pinson Mounds. In the Mound 14 Sector, Fisher and McNutt discovered the remains of a 21 by 18 feet (6.4 m × 5.5 m) house surrounded by a posthole-lined wall-trench and containing a central hearth and storage pits. Based primarily on the vast amount of pre-Mississippian culture debris found at the site and radiocarbon dating of charcoal, Fisher and McNutt concluded that the Pinson Mounds were probably built during the Middle Woodland period, c. 1-500 AD.

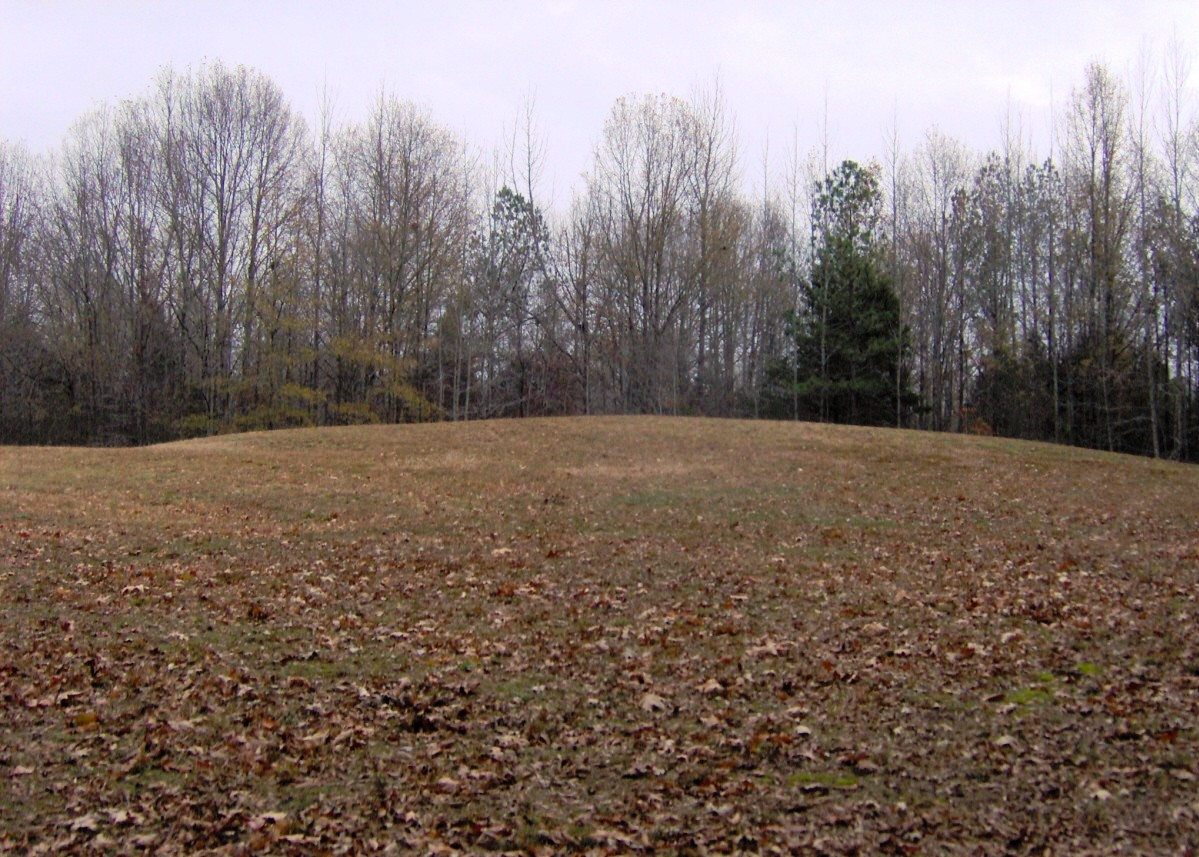
Mound 12

Excavations by Dan Morse and Richard Polhemus in 1963 uncovered what they believed was an oval-shaped house, a large hearth, and various refuse pits. Morse and Polhemus agreed that the mounds were mostly built during the Middle Woodland period. The state purchased the prehistoric property in 1965 from the Williams and Saul families. It was added to the National Register of Historic Places that same year.

In the 1970s, John Broster of the Tennessee Division of Archaeology carried out extensive investigations of the site's Western section and the Mound 12 Sector. Broster uncovered a human cremation pit and evidence of Early Woodland-period habitation at Mound 12. Broster's team also found a number of "exotic" artifacts at the Cochran area. This suggested Pinson Mounds may have been a "manufacture" area for grave goods, or a regional trade center.

In the 1980s, Robert Mainfort discovered six tombs in the Twin Mounds, one of which contained the remains of eight young women wearing headdresses with copper adornments. Another tomb had four older men, one of whom had been buried with two round rattles bearing abstract designs. Mainfort also uncovered a single burial in Mound 31 and evidence of food offerings at the base of the mounds.

Excavations carried out prior to construction of park facilities uncovered a possible habitation area at Mound 11 and a large number of 19th-century artifacts. In the late 1990s, four additional mounds were verified as prehistoric, bringing the total to 17.

=== The function of the Pinson Mounds ===
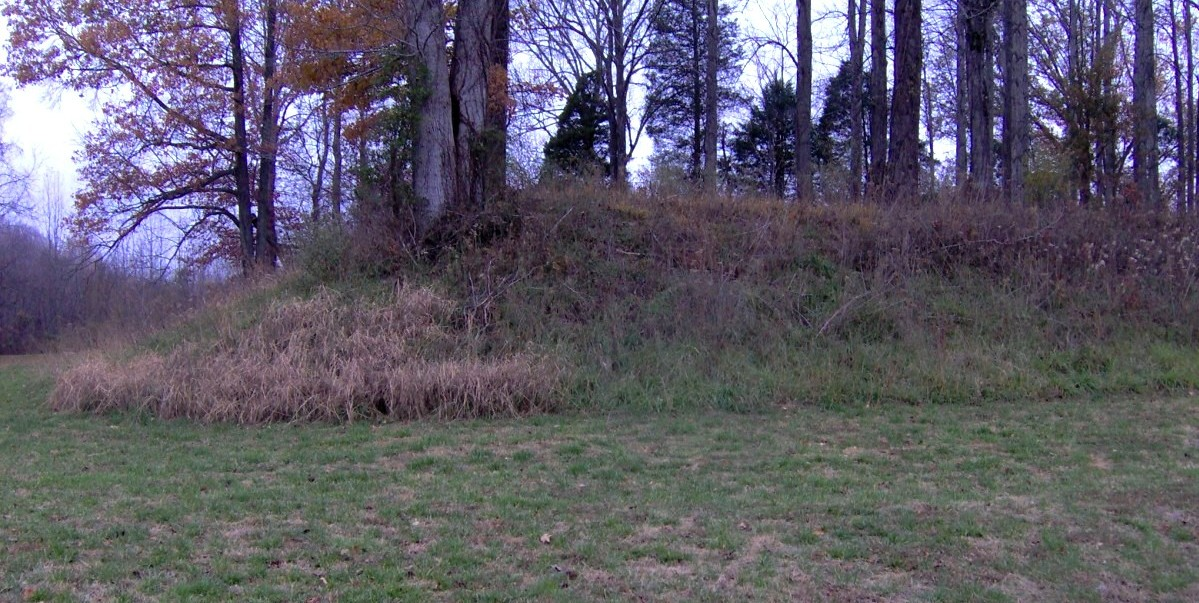
The southwest corner of Mound 28

The Middle Woodland natives most likely built the Pinson Mounds primarily for religious ceremonial purposes, although their motives have yet to be established definitively. The Ozier Mound contains no burials and because of its shape, ramped and flat-topped, it was most likely used as a ceremonial platform. It is one of the oldest such mounds in the Eastern Woodlands region. At least three of the mounds— 6, 12, and 31— contain burials or cremations. Excavations have turned up a relatively scant amount of cultural material (e.g., arrowheads and pottery fragments), which points to a lack of permanent habitation at the Pinson Mounds site.

Some evidence suggests that the layout of the Pinson Mounds might be due to astronomical alignment, and expresses the people's cosmology, as is the case at some later mound complexes, such as Cahokia. The corners of Sauls' Mound, for instance, face the four cardinal directions. The Eastern and Western sections of the complex are roughly equidistant (appx. 1,500 metres (4,900 ft)) from the Inner complex, although the alignment is not exact. Mound 29 in the Eastern section is aligned with Sauls' Mound in the direction of the equinox sunrise, and Mound 28 is almost aligned with Sauls' in the direction of the Summer solstice sunrise. To date, no mound has been found in the direction of the Winter solstice sunrise.

== Pinson Mounds State Archaeological Park ==
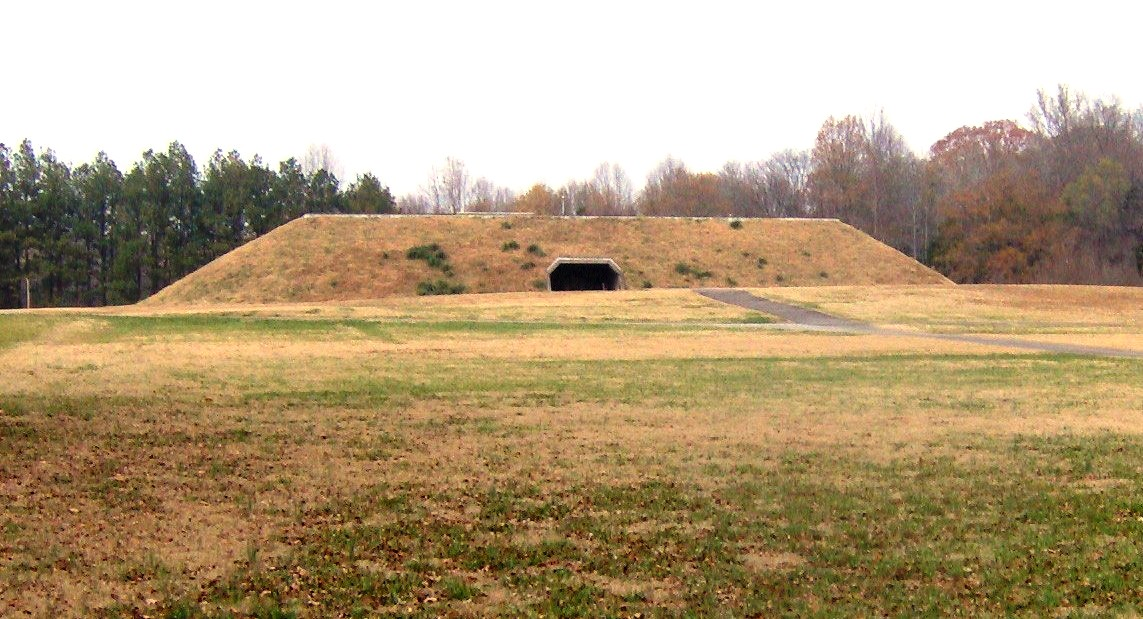
The Pinson Mounds Museum

The park's museum is built within a "replica" of a platform mound. Its exhibits include artifacts obtained from the various excavations at the Pinson site, as well as various other artifacts from around the region. The museum is also home to the West Tennessee Regional Archaeology offices and an archaeological library.

The park contains approximately 6 miles (9.7 km) of walking trails, most of which explore the mounds and associated features. South of Sauls' Mound, a boardwalk looks out over the South Fork of the Forked Deer River and its wetlands. The park is also the site of Archaeofest, an event held every September that celebrates the site's prehistoric builders.

== See also ==
- Old Stone Fort
- Hopewell culture
- List of burial mounds in the United States
- List of National Historic Landmarks in Tennessee
- National Register of Historic Places listings in Madison County, Tennessee
