= Tornadoes of 2021 =

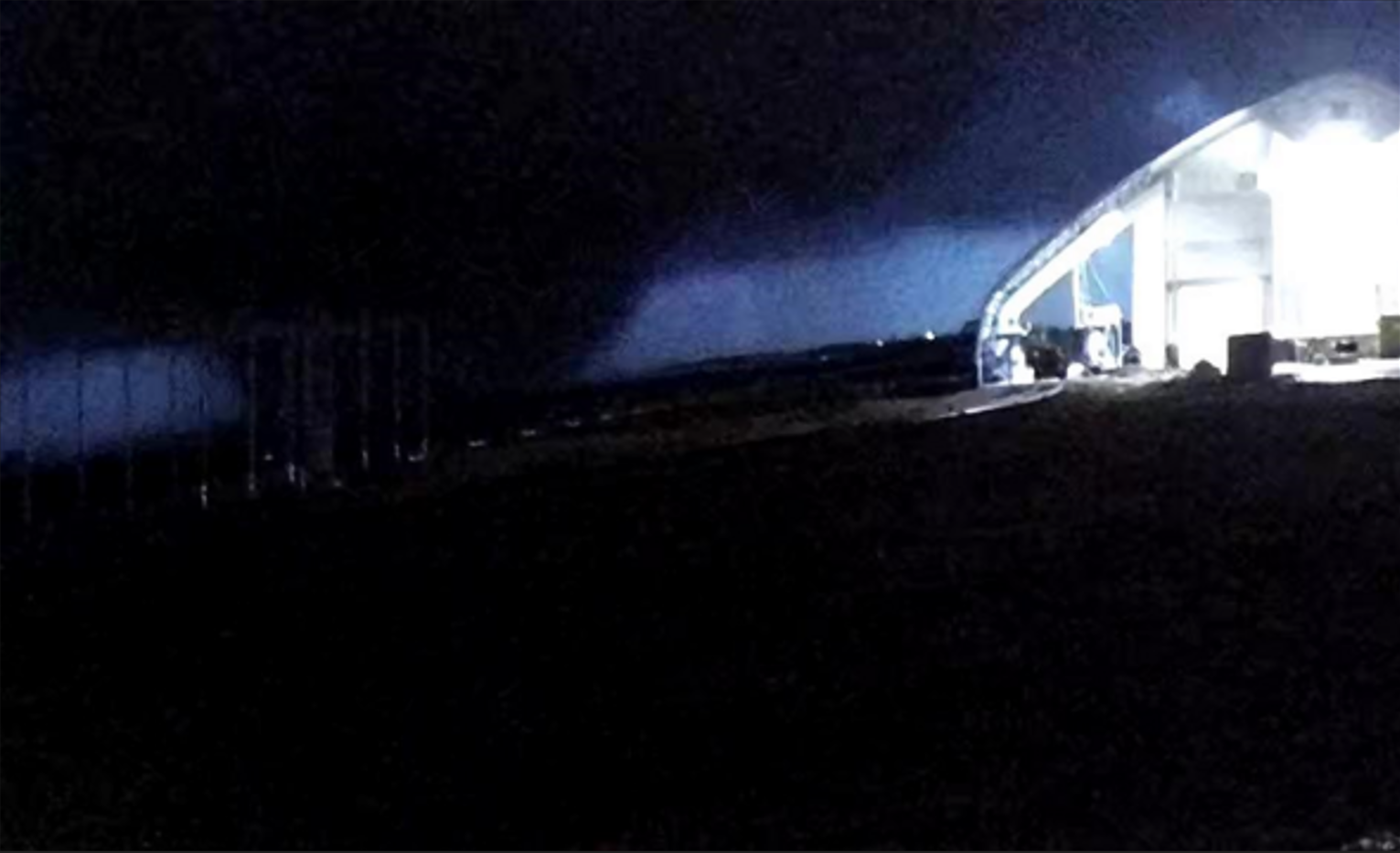
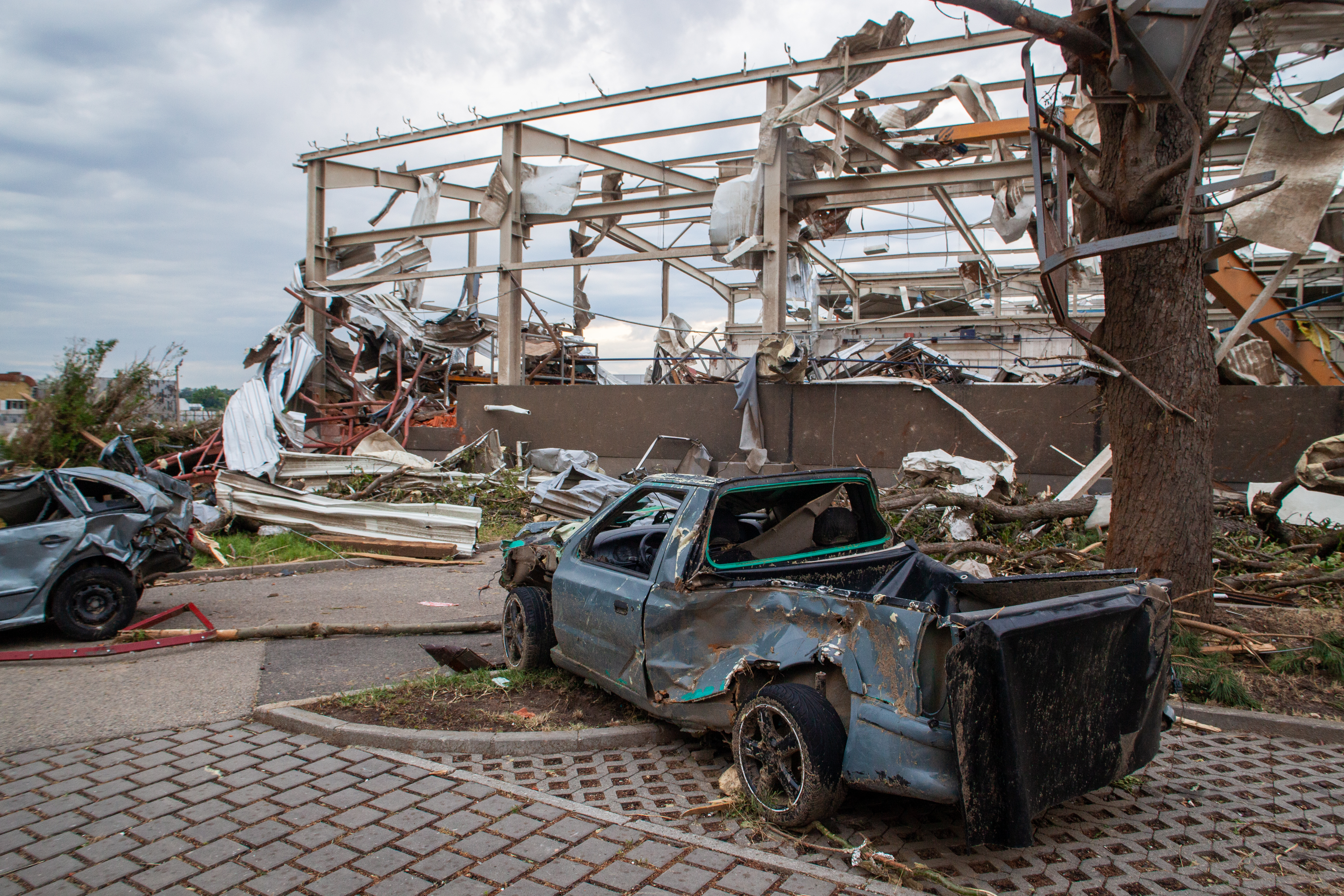
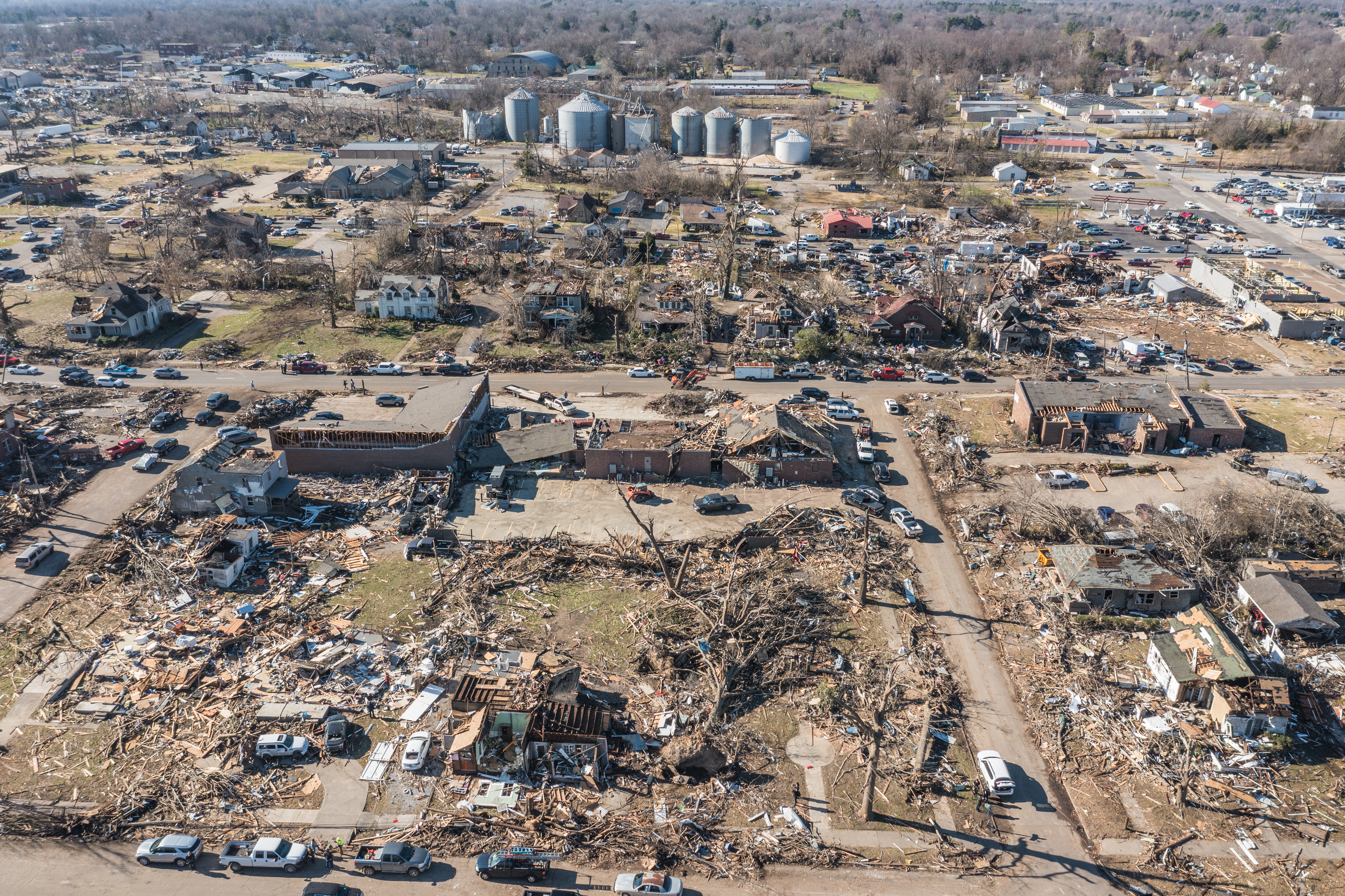
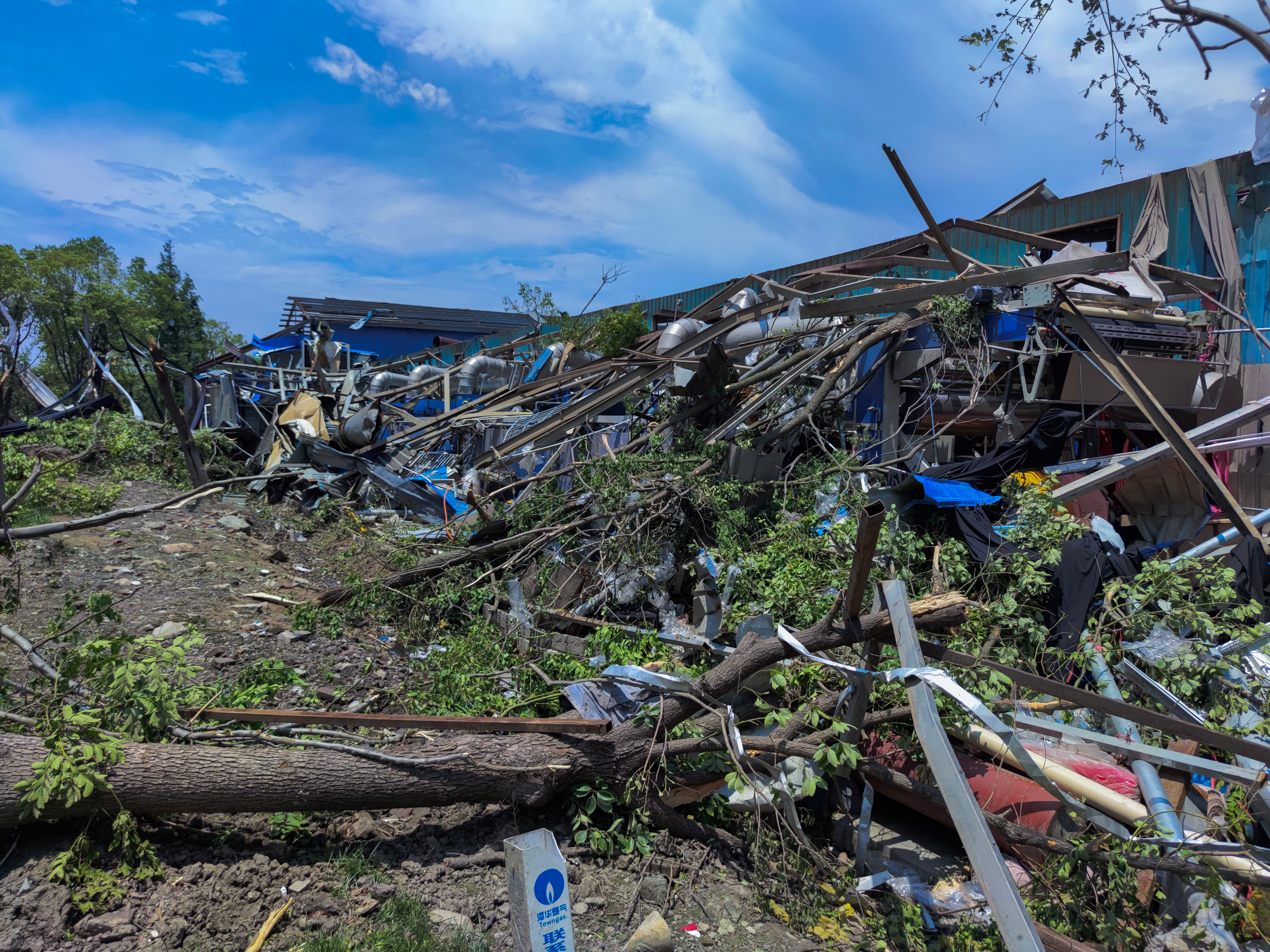
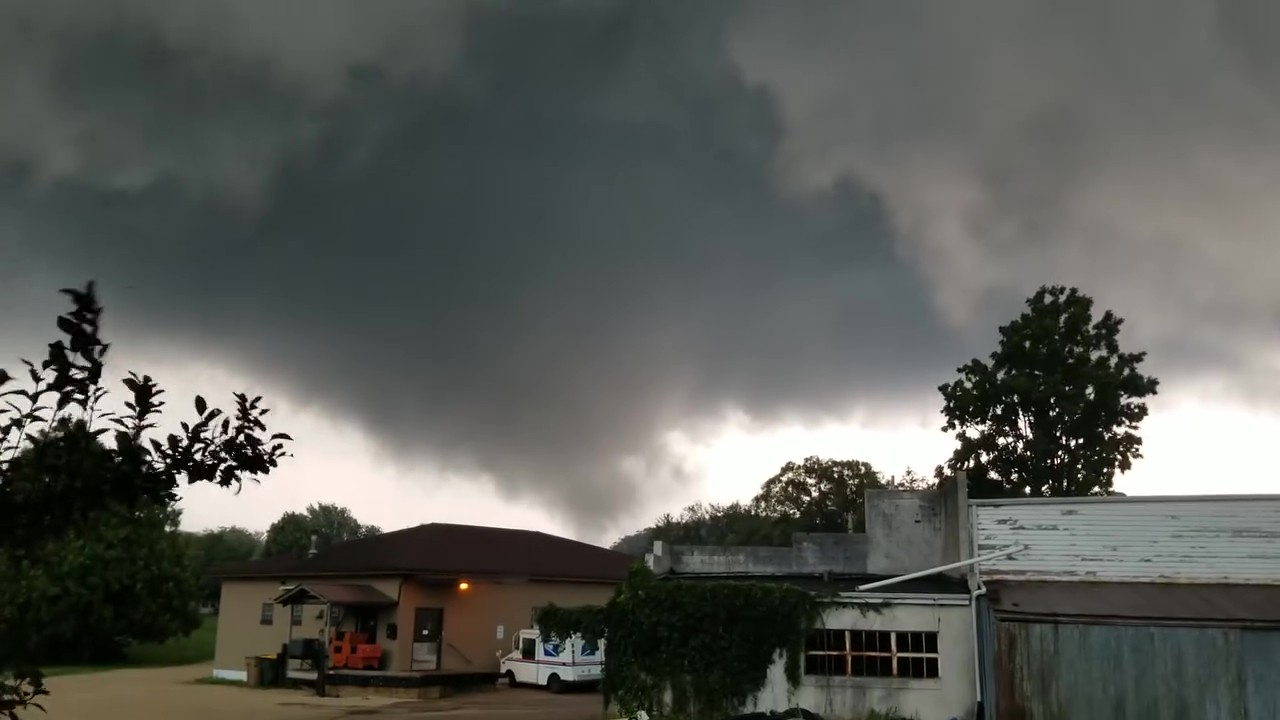
- Clockwise from top: An EF4 tornado near Hayti, Missouri on December 10; A radar loop of an EF4 tornado striking Newnan, Georgia on March 25; Damage from a deadly EF3 tornado in Shengze, China on May 14; A large EF3 tornado shortly after formation in Boscobel, Wisconsin on August 7; Tornado damage in Mayfield, Kentucky following a large EF4 tornado on December 10; Major damage caused by an IF4 tornado in Lužice, Czech Republic on June 24.
- Timespan: January 1 – December 31
- Maximum rated tornado: EF4 tornado: Newnan, Georgia on March 26 (Note: The Newnan tornado initially formed late on March 25, but the EF4 damage and the fatality occurred just after midnight on March 26.); South Moravian Region, Czech Republic (IF4) on June 24; Missouri Bootheel–Northwest Tennessee on December 10; Western Kentucky on December 10
- Tornadoes in U.S.: 1,315
- Damage (U.S.): >$7.7 billion
- Fatalities (U.S.): 103
- Fatalities (worldwide): 145

This page documents notable tornadoes and tornado outbreaks worldwide in 2021. Strong and destructive tornadoes form most frequently in the United States, Argentina, Brazil, Bangladesh, and Eastern India, but can occur almost anywhere under the right conditions. Tornadoes also develop occasionally in southern Canada during the Northern Hemisphere's summer and somewhat regularly at other times of the year across Europe, Asia, Argentina, Australia and New Zealand. Tornadic events are often accompanied by other forms of severe weather, including strong thunderstorms, strong winds, and hail. Worldwide, 145 tornado-related deaths were confirmed with 103 in the United States, 23 in China, six in the Czech Republic, four in Russia, three in Italy, two in India, and one each in Canada, New Zealand, Indonesia, and Turkey.

The year started well below average with the lowest amount of tornado reports through the first two months in the past 16 years and remained below-average for most of the year due to inactivity during April, June, September, and November. (Despite this, several significant outbreaks occurred in March, May, July, August, and October.)

However, the year ended on a destructive note, as December was incredibly active - more than doubling the previous record - which pushed 2021 above average (most of which came from the December 15 tornado outbreak in the Midwest). Additionally, 2021 had the most tornado fatalities in the United States since 2011, 57 of which came from a single EF4 tornado in Western Kentucky on December 10.

== Events ==
=== United States ===
There were 1,377 preliminary filtered reported tornadoes, and 1,315 confirmed tornadoes in the United States in 2021.

Confirmed tornadoes by Enhanced Fujita rating
| EFU | EF0 | EF1 | EF2 | EF3 | EF4 | EF5 | Total |
|---|---|---|---|---|---|---|---|
| 210 | 545 | 433 | 103 | 21 | 3 | 0 | 1,315 |

A map of 2021 United States tornado paths from the results of storm surveys.

A chart of the 2021 United States tornado count estimated from the number of preliminary reports.

Fatal United States tornadoes in 2021
- Approximate touchdown location of killer tornadoes in 2021 Summary of tornadoes: January 25 – Alabama (1 death); February 15 – North Carolina (3 deaths); March 25 – Alabama (6 deaths); March 27 – Texas (1 death); April 10 – Louisiana (1 death); September 1 – Pennsylvania (1 death); October 27 – Mississippi (1 death); December 10 – Arkansas, Missouri, Tennessee (8 deaths); December 10 – Missouri (1 death); December 10 – Illinois (6 deaths); December 10 – Tennessee, Kentucky (57 deaths); December 11 – Kentucky (16 deaths); December 11 – Kentucky (1 death); Total fatalities: 103

==== Costliest United States tornadoes ====
All damage totals are in US dollars, unadjusted for inflation. Data from the National Oceanic and Atmospheric Administration's National Centers for Environmental Information (NOAA NCEI).

Costliest United States tornadoes in 2021
| Rank | Area affected | EF# | Date | Damage (2021-22 USD) | Refs |
|---|---|---|---|---|---|
| 1 | Franklin–Newnan–Peachtree City, Georgia | EF4 | March 25 | $20,550,000 | |
| 2 | Moffet, Oklahoma–Van Buren, Arkansas | EF1 | May 3 | $16,030,000 | |
| 3 | Monette, Arkansas/Braggadocio, Missouri/Reelfoot Lake, Tennessee | EF4 | December 10 | $13,500,000 | |
| 4 | Kenton–Dresden, Tennessee–Pembroke, Kentucky | EF3 | December 10 | $11,026,100 | |
| 5 | Pontiac Lake, Michigan | EF1 | July 24 | $8,500,000 | |
| 6 | West Middletown–Houston, Pennsylvania | EF2 | October 21 | $7,500,000 | |
| 7 | Trumann, Arkansas | EF2 | December 10 | $6,300,000 | |
| 8 | Fort Washington–Horsham, Pennsylvania | EF2 | September 1 | $5,000,000 | |
| 8 | Cedar Grove–Mullica Hill–Wenonah–Deptford, New Jersey | EF3 | September 1 | $64,000,000 | |
| 8 | Edwardsville, Illinois | EF3 | December 10 | $5,000,000 | |
| TBD | Western Kentucky | EF4 | December 10 | $507,000,000 | |

== January ==
=== January 2 (Indonesia) ===
A tornado touched down in Slangit Village within the Cirebon Regency, flattening three small houses, and destroying or heavily damaging eight others. The tornado also downed several trees, some of which landed on houses and caused minor damage.

=== January 25–27 (United States) ===
| EFU | EF0 | EF1 | EF2 | EF3 | EF4 | EF5 |
|---|---|---|---|---|---|---|
| 0 | 1 | 2 | 0 | 1 | 0 | 0 |

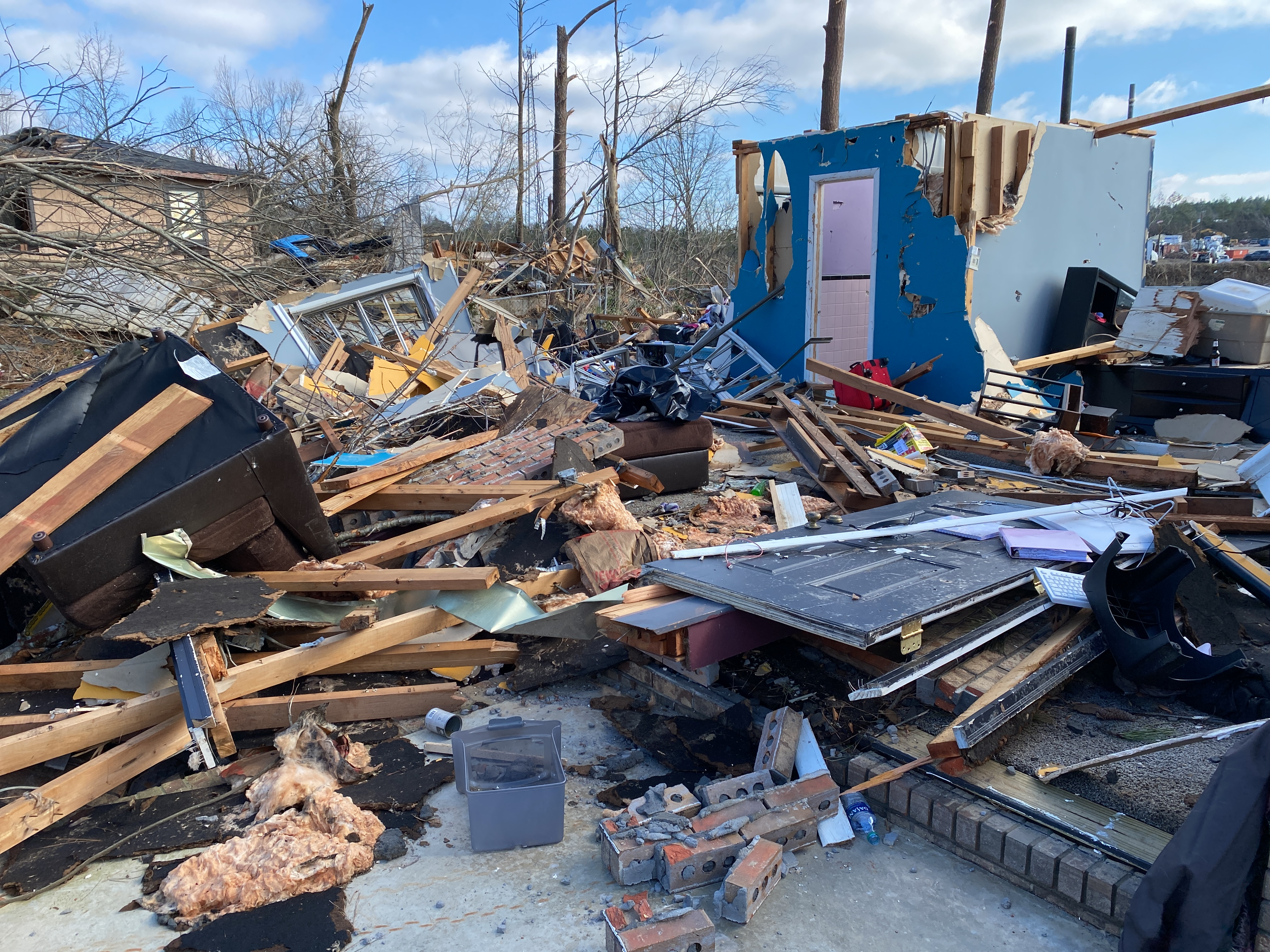
EF3 damage to a home in Fultondale, Alabama.

Following a period of inactivity, the Storm Prediction Center issued a slight risk for severe weather for a broad area in northwest Alabama, northeast Mississippi, and southern Tennessee on January 25. This included a 5% risk for tornadoes. Isolated to scattered severe weather occurred throughout the afternoon into the evening, including an EF0 tornado that caused some tree damage in Fayette County, Tennessee. Later that evening, an isolated severe storm developed in Central Mississippi near I-55. The storm then tracked northeastward into Alabama, approaching the northern Birmingham metro area by 10:20 p.m. (04:20 UTC), exhibiting consistent, but broad, rotation. At 10:40 p.m. (04:40 UTC), the storm unexpectedly produced an intense and destructive tornado that struck the suburbs of Fultondale and Center Point. Significant structural damage occurred in Fultondale, with numerous homes, vehicles, and businesses being severely damaged or destroyed. A Hampton Inn sustained major structural damage, and Fultondale High School was significantly damaged as well. Considerable damage to homes and trees was also noted farther to the northeast in Center Point along the 10.4-mile (16.7 km) long damage path, which was up to 900 yards (820 m) wide. The tornado, which was rated mid-range EF3 with maximum winds of up to 150 mph (240 km/h), killed one person and injured at least 30 others.

After no tornadic activity on January 26, two weak EF1 tornadoes touched down southwest of Tallahassee, Florida, the next day. The second of the two tornadoes caused damage to the Tallahassee International Airport and narrowly missed the National Weather Service NEXRAD radar site at the airport, although functionality of the radar was disabled for about an hour after the tornado struck the airport grounds due to communication issues. Several planes and structures were damaged, but no injuries were reported. The tornado continued east, causing additional sporadic tree and property damage before lifting after tracking for 21.4 miles (34.4 km). It was given a rating of low-end EF1 based on tree damage in the employee lot of the airport.

=== January 26 (Turkey) ===
A brief, but strong F2 tornado touched down in Yildirim, Bursa Province, damaging at least 20 structures and killing one person. Industrial buildings were damaged, some significantly, and vehicles were flipped and damaged by the tornado as well, one of which was tossed onto the roof of a building. The fatality occurred when a man was struck by flying debris.

== February ==
=== February 15 (United States) ===
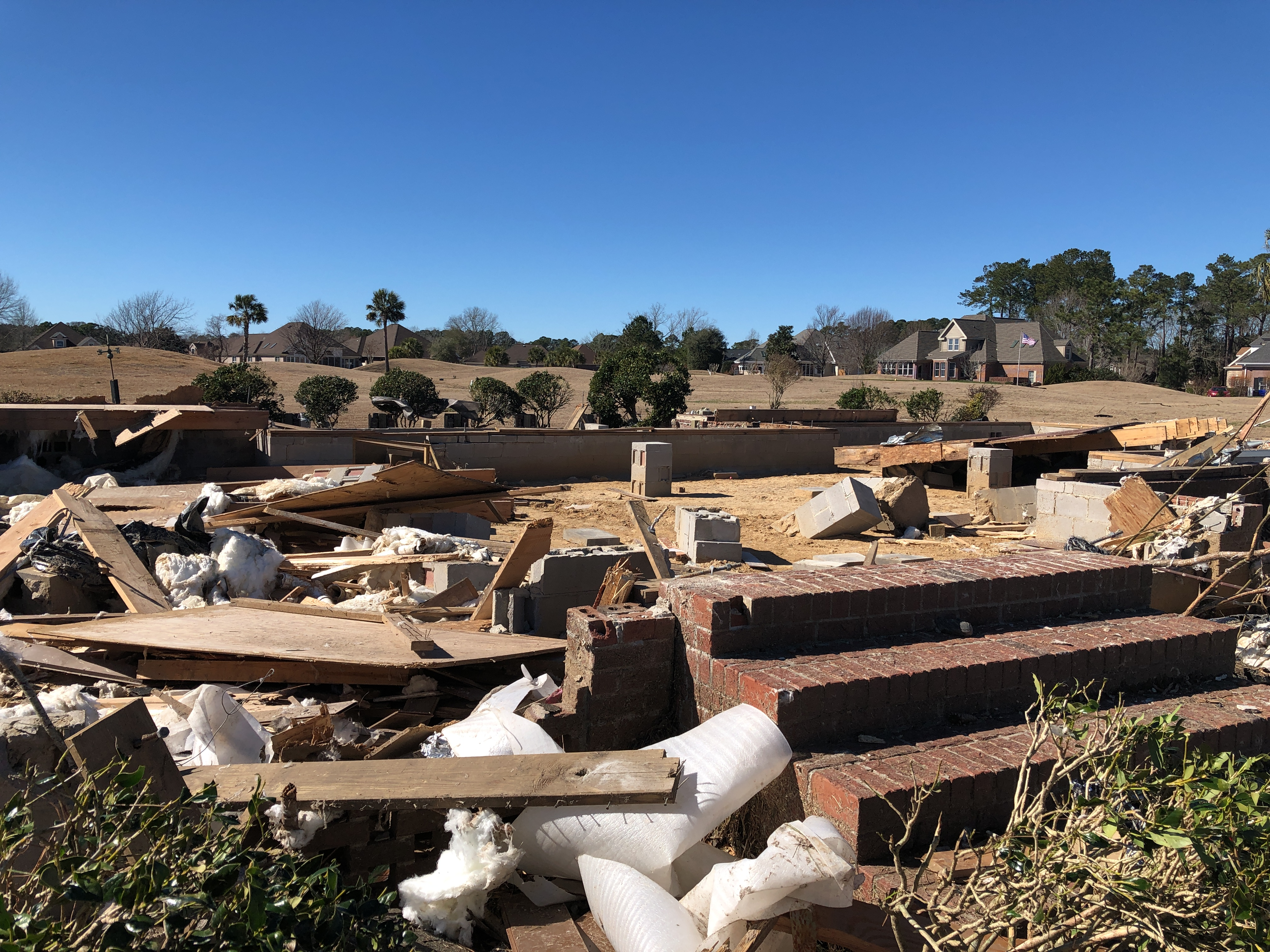
High-end EF3 damage to a home where two fatalities occurred in Grissettown, North Carolina.

| EFU | EF0 | EF1 | EF2 | EF3 | EF4 | EF5 |
|---|---|---|---|---|---|---|
| 0 | 4 | 0 | 1 | 1 | 0 | 0 |

On February 15, the Storm Prediction Center issued an Enhanced risk for severe weather. Multiple tornadoes, two of which were strong and destructive, struck the states of Florida, Georgia, and North Carolina. One supercell produced a tornado family of three tornadoes in the Florida Panhandle and Southwestern Georgia, with the final one being a large, strong EF2 tornado that caused major damage to homes and injured five people just outside of Damascus, Georgia. Around midnight, a destructive high-end EF3 tornado heavily damaged or destroyed dozens of homes in the Ocean Ridge Plantation subdivision near Sunset Beach, North Carolina. A community garden center and two homes were leveled at that location, one of which was swept completely away. A large metal building, several vehicles and RVs, and many trees sustained significant damage as well. Three fatalities and 10 injuries occurred as a result of this tornado. It was the deadliest tornado in Southeastern North Carolina since an F3 tornado killed eight in Riegelwood in November 2006. A total of six tornadoes were confirmed.

== March ==
=== March 13 (United States) ===
| EFU | EF0 | EF1 | EF2 | EF3 | EF4 | EF5 |
|---|---|---|---|---|---|---|
| 10 | 4 | 4 | 3 | 0 | 0 | 0 |

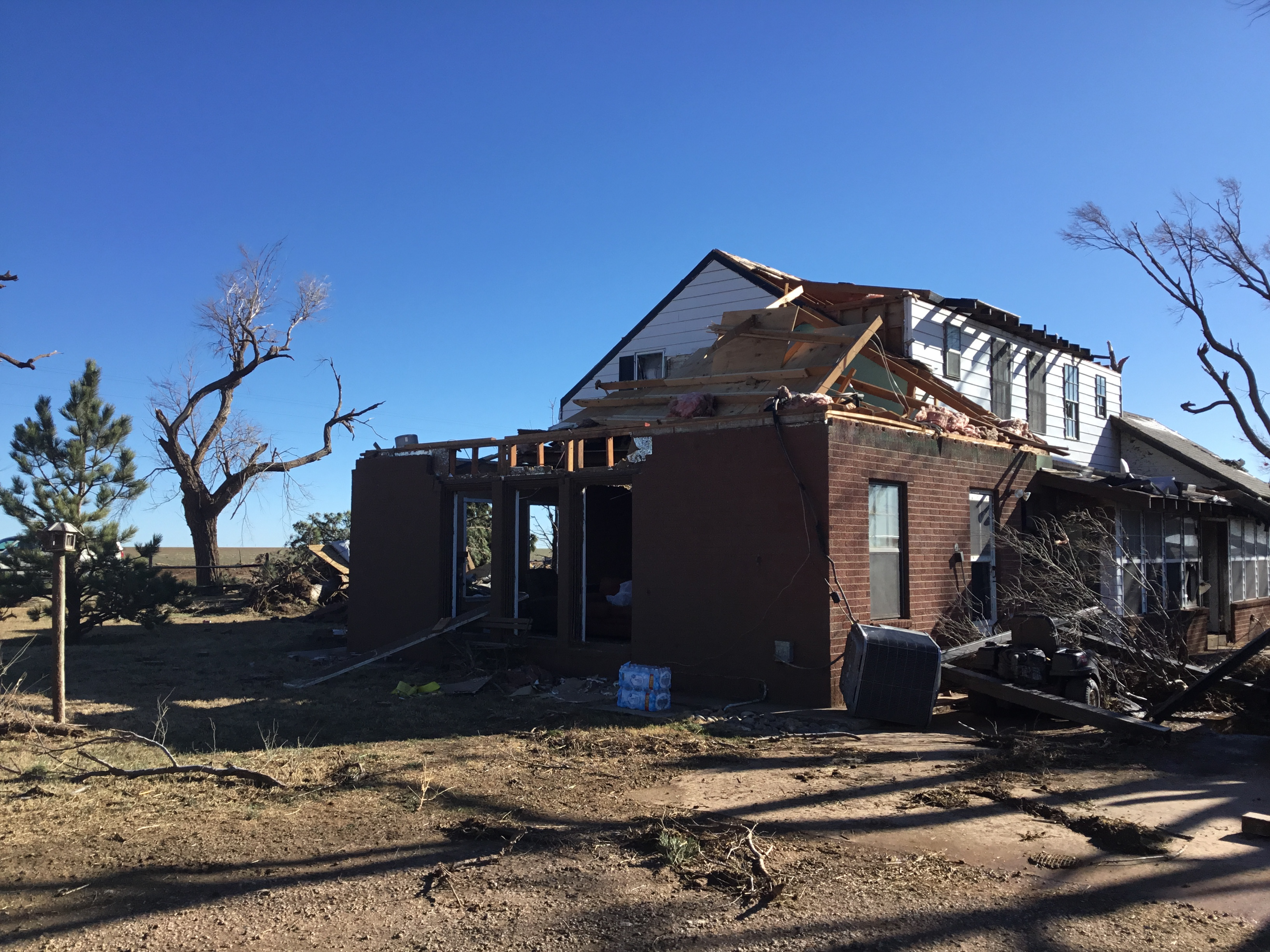
EF2 damage to a home north of Happy, Texas.

On the morning of March 13, the Storm Prediction Center issued a moderate risk for the Texas Panhandle, including a 15% risk for strong tornadoes. Multiple tornadoes touched down across the Panhandle, mainly areas between Lubbock and Amarillo and points eastward. A large EF2 wedge tornado moved from southwest of Happy in Swisher County to east of Canyon in Randall County, toppling a cell tower, inflicting major roof damage to homes, and snapping trees and power poles. As the tornado dissipated, a new tornado, rated EF1, formed and moved into Armstrong County, passing over Palo Duro Canyon, where several RVs were tossed and a cabin had its roof blown off. A third tornado was spawned just northeast of the second one, also crossing from Randall County to Armstrong County and lifting near Washburn, just before crossing into Carson County. Another EF2 tornado caused minor damage in Clarendon before strengthening and causing major damage to power poles and a mobile home near the Greenbelt Lake Reservoir. Farther to the north, an EF2 tornado moved through a rural area near Ensign, Kansas, snapping power poles and causing damage to grain bins and pivot irrigation sprinklers, although no tornado warning was issued for the storm. Several other tornadoes touched down very briefly and received ratings of EFU because they did not cause any damage. A total of 21 tornadoes were confirmed.

=== March 16–18 (United States) ===
| EFU | EF0 | EF1 | EF2 | EF3 | EF4 | EF5 |
|---|---|---|---|---|---|---|
| 0 | 24 | 23 | 4 | 0 | 0 | 0 |

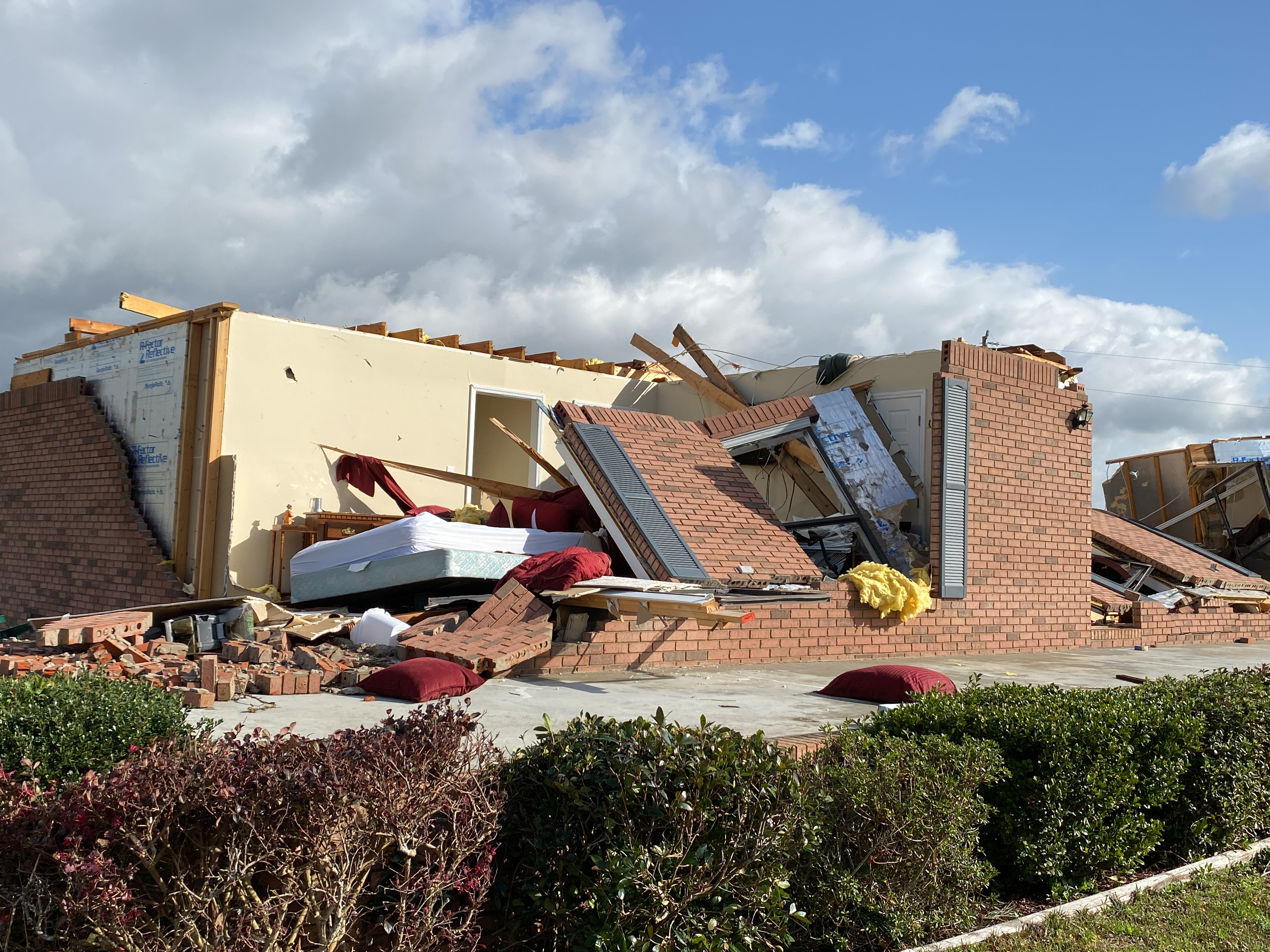
High-end EF2 damage to a house near Billingsley, Alabama.

Following isolated tornado activity on March 16, a rare high risk outlook was issued by the SPC for March 17 in Mississippi and Alabama, including a 45% risk area for tornadoes, the first of which since May 2019. Forecasters noted the potential for violent, long-tracked tornadoes to occur in the risk area, though this did not occur. However, a few strong tornadoes did touch down and cause significant damage, though none exceeded EF2 intensity. The first tornado of the day touched down west of Waynesboro, Mississippi, just after 12:00 p.m. CDT and caused EF2 damage to chicken houses and trees. Other strong EF2 tornadoes caused damage in and around Silas, Billingsley, and Burnsville, Alabama. More severe weather occurred on March 18 along the Atlantic coast from Florida to Southern Maryland, and a moderate risk was issued from Eastern Georgia to North Central North Carolina on March 17. The moderate risk was downgraded to enhanced on March 18 due to a lack of buoyancy in the atmosphere, but numerous strong to severe thunderstorms still tracked through the area during the afternoon. Several more tornadoes were confirmed before the storms moved offshore that evening. Overall, this outbreak produced 51 tornadoes and no fatalities.

=== March 24–28 (United States) ===
| EFU | EF0 | EF1 | EF2 | EF3 | EF4 | EF5 |
|---|---|---|---|---|---|---|
| 2 | 10 | 16 | 10 | 4 | 1 | 0 |

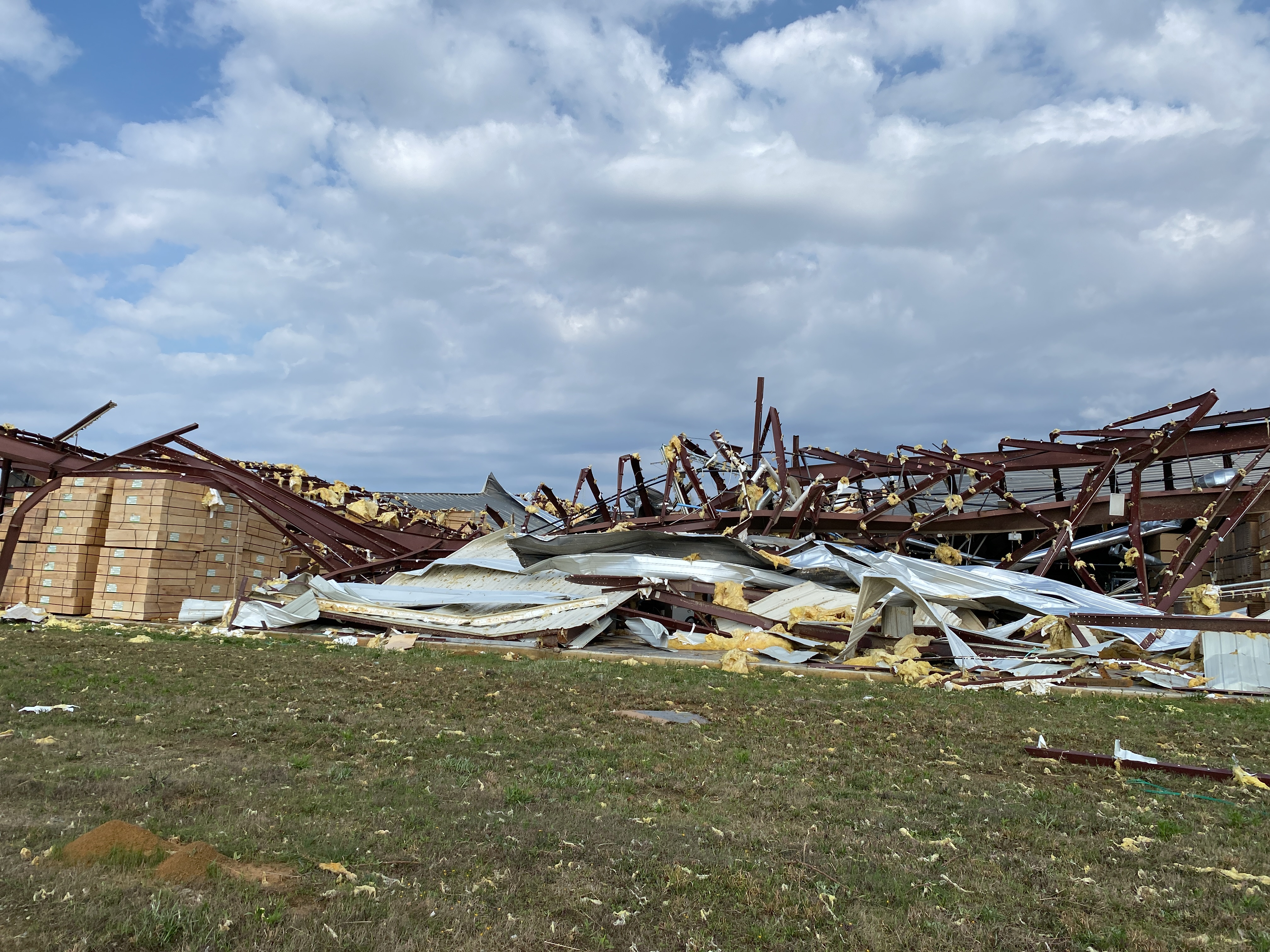
EF3 damage to the Precision Materials manufacturing facility near Ohatchee, Alabama.

After isolated tornado and widespread hail activity in Texas the previous day, March 25 brought another severe weather outbreak to the Deep South, where a high risk outlook was issued for the second time in eight days. This included a 30% risk for tornadoes, with the potential for multiple strong and long-tracked tornadoes noted in the outlook discussion. The first supercell of the day produced three low-end EF3 tornadoes in central Alabama with the second one prompting a tornado emergency—the first of three issued during the outbreak—in Shelby County, Alabama. That tornado damaged or destroyed many homes in the southern suburbs of Birmingham. The home of broadcast meteorologist James Spann was one of the residences damaged by this tornado. The third tornado destroyed a manufacturing facility and a church, and badly damaged or destroyed many homes in and around Ohatchee, Alabama, killing six people. A long-tracked EF3 wedge tornado also tracked over 80 miles (130 km) across five counties in central Alabama for 98 minutes, causing significant damage near Sawyerville, Greensboro and Brent while injuring 13. The most intense tornado of the event was a low-end EF4 tornado that caused major damage in Newnan, Georgia, during the overnight hours, leveling homes and resulting in one indirect death due to a heart attack.

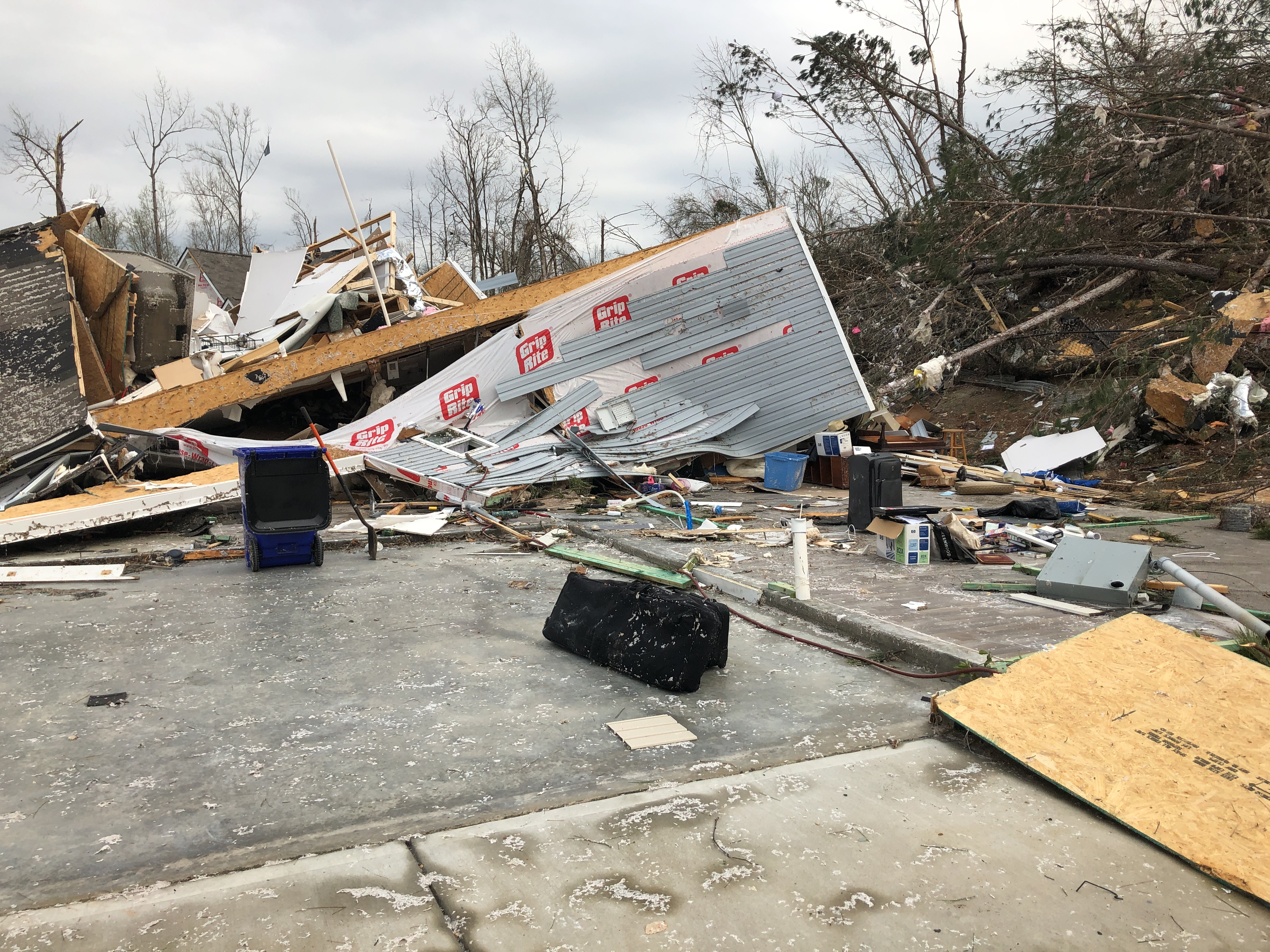
A home that was swept off its foundation at low-end EF4 intensity in Newnan, Georgia.

An EF2 tornado ripped the roofs off several homes near Waynesboro, Tennessee, as well. Tornado activity on March 26 was limited to a high-end EF1 tornado that damaged a house and flipped a car near Middlebury, Vermont, injuring two people. However, the SPC issued an enhanced risk for parts of the Southern United States for March 27, including a 10% hatched risk area for tornadoes. More strong tornadoes were reported that evening, and several PDS tornado warnings were issued in Texas, Arkansas, and Tennessee. One person was killed by an EF2 tornado that badly damaged or destroyed multiple homes near Carthage, Texas. An EF2 tornado also severely damaged a rice mill near De Witt, Arkansas, and another EF2 tornado struck the north edge of Monticello, tossing multiple vehicles and damaging a construction company. A final EF1 tornado that destroyed outbuildings and downed trees was confirmed near Fairview, Alabama, on the morning March 28 before a squall line produced widespread wind damage in the Philadelphia metropolitan area that afternoon. The severe weather ended that night as the storms moved offshore into the Atlantic Ocean. Overall, 43 tornadoes were confirmed throughout the outbreak sequence, which led to seven fatalities, plus one indirect and numerous injuries.

=== March 24 (Philippines) ===
An EF2 tornado struck Esperanza, Agusan del Sur where it left a total of 32 houses partially damaged. It also damaged a Material recycling facility and a waiting shed.

=== March 28 (Indonesia) ===
A strong multi-vortex tornado hit Cimenyan in the Bandung Regency, causing significant damage to several homes, businesses, and many trees, injuring eight people. Reports indicate that the tornado was spawned by a circulation embedded within a line of severe thunderstorms.

== April ==
=== April 3 (Indonesia) ===
A narrow tornado touched down in Sumenep Regency, causing damage in and around the village of Pinggir Papas in the Kalianget District. Three people were injured by the tornado, which damaged 18 houses.

=== April 7–8 (United States) ===
| EFU | EF0 | EF1 | EF2 | EF3 | EF4 | EF5 |
|---|---|---|---|---|---|---|
| 0 | 7 | 8 | 2 | 0 | 0 | 0 |

Scattered tornado activity occurred in Louisiana, Mississippi, Arkansas, and Iowa from April 7 into the early morning hours of April 8, with 12 tornadoes being confirmed. An EF0 tornado in southwestern Cedar Rapids, Iowa, caused minor injuries to one person from glass after their bedroom window was blown in, while an EF1 tornado injured another person in Bastrop, Louisiana. More scattered severe weather occurred during the afternoon of April 8 and four more tornadoes were confirmed across the Cumberland Plateau in Tennessee. An EF0 tornado damaged Pleasant Hill Elementary School and a nearby nursing home in Pleasant Hill in Cumberland County, while three tornadoes, including two rated EF2, caused heavy damage in the Norma and Straight Fork communities in Scott County. Several homes sustained heavy damage, including a double-wide mobile home which was destroyed. Damage totaled to at least $515 million.

=== April 9–11 (United States) ===
| EFU | EF0 | EF1 | EF2 | EF3 | EF4 | EF5 |
|---|---|---|---|---|---|---|
| 0 | 8 | 10 | 1 | 1 | 0 | 0 |

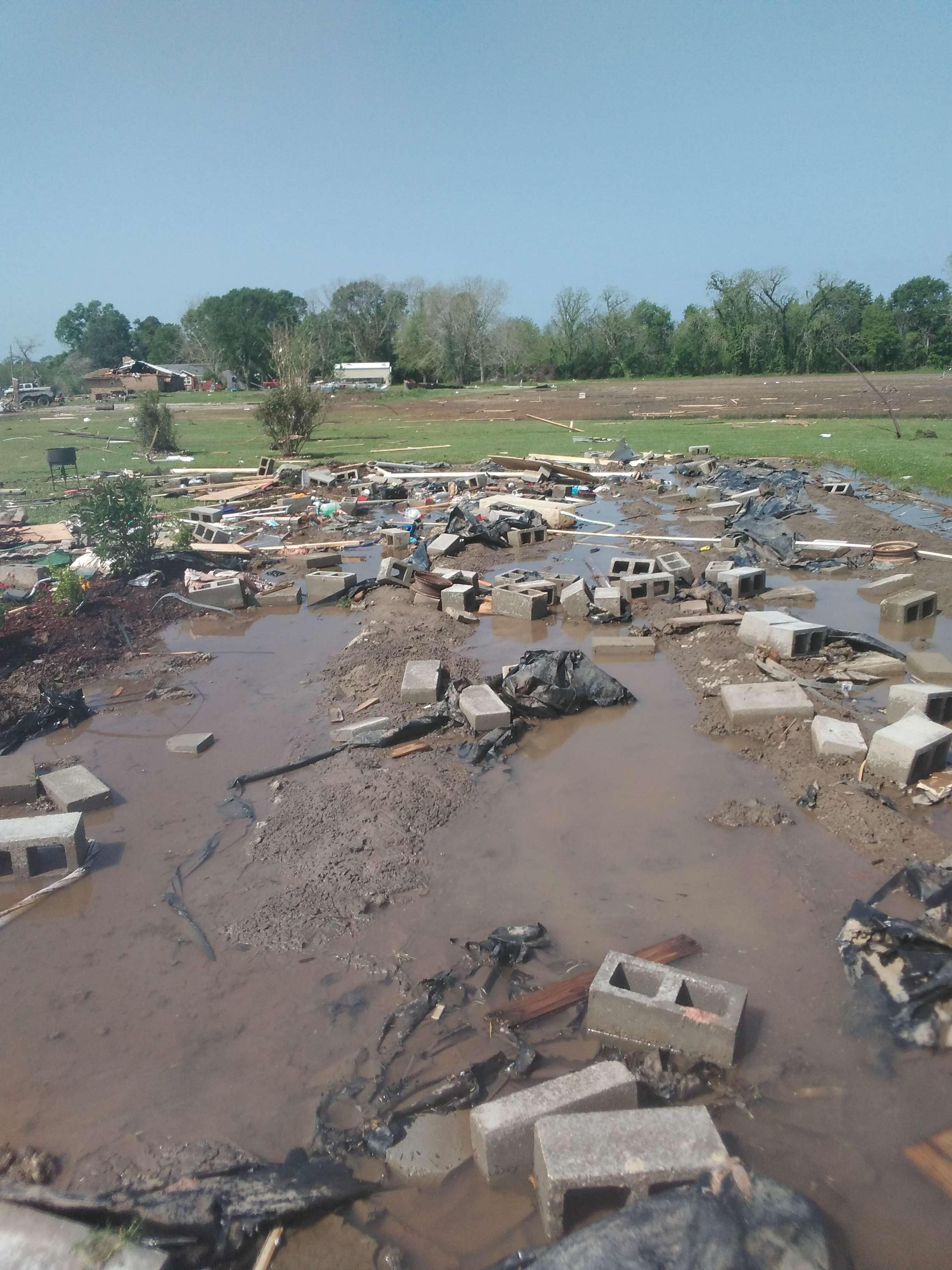
A mobile home that was obliterated by an EF3 tornado in Waxia, Louisiana.

Several rounds of intense severe thunderstorms brought significant damaging winds, very large hail, and several tornadoes primarily across the Southern United States from April 9 into the evening of April 11. April 9 started with several clusters of multi-cells, supercells, and bowing segments across much of the Deep South. Strong straight-line thunderstorm winds in Shreveport, Louisiana, toppled a tree onto a mobile home around 6:30 p.m. (23:30 UTC), resulting in a fatality. Several large hail-producing supercells then formed and moved through areas from Oklahoma to North Texas before merging into a large squall line and surging southeastward into Arkansas and Louisiana, producing widespread wind damage. Meanwhile, several tornado-producing supercells formed ahead of the line. A weak EF0 tornado was recorded by several storm spotters near Pelahatchie, Mississippi, causing intermittent tree damage. Just after midnight on April 10, a large EF1 tornado ripped roofs off of sheds and carports and knocked down trees, including some that fell on homes, near Columbia, Mississippi. To the southwest, a low-end EF3 tornado tossed vehicles and damaged or destroyed several homes and mobile homes in the rural community of Waxia near Palmetto, Louisiana, just after 2:00 a.m. CDT (07:00 UTC), resulting in one fatality and seven injuries. Later that morning, the squall line produced multiple tornadoes in the Florida Panhandle. A strong tornadic waterspout came onshore in Laguna Beach, Florida, causing severe EF2 damage to a business and damaging several homes. Another tornadic waterspout struck Gulf Lagoon Beach, located at the southeastern edge of the Panama City Beach city limits and caused EF0 damage to beach furniture. In Lynn Haven, an EF1 tornado caused considerable damage to an automotive business. That afternoon, isolated to widely scattered severe storms formed from the Great Lakes to the Carolinas, producing sporadic wind and hail damage as well as isolated tornadoes into the overnight hours. An EF1 tornado also caused damage to businesses and a radio tower, and flipped a car near Seneca, South Carolina. A brief EF0 tornado damaged a few homes near Cutlerville, Michigan, and another EF0 tornado damaged a home near Reidville, South Carolina. Early on April 11, another EF1 tornado caused damage to homes and outbuildings near Belvoir, North Carolina. That afternoon, another squall line pushed southeastward down the entire Florida panhandle, producing mainly wind and hail damage, although a brief EF0 tornado that caused minor tree damage was confirmed near Eagle Lake. Another non-tornadic fatality occurred near Spring Hill when a person got out of their car after it was struck by a fallen tree and was electrocuted when they came in contact with downed power lines. Overall, the outbreak generated 20 tornadoes, resulting in one fatality. Two other non-tornadic deaths also occurred as a result of the severe weather. There was also at least $635 million in damage.

=== April 17 (Indonesia) ===
A tornado touched down in Meko Village, West Pamona Sub-District, Poso Regency in Sulawesi, heavily damaging several homes and two churches. One person was killed. Total losses were estimated at Rp 130 million (US$9,100).

=== April 23–25 (United States) ===
| EFU | EF0 | EF1 | EF2 | EF3 | EF4 | EF5 |
|---|---|---|---|---|---|---|
| 5 | 3 | 4 | 2 | 0 | 0 | 0 |

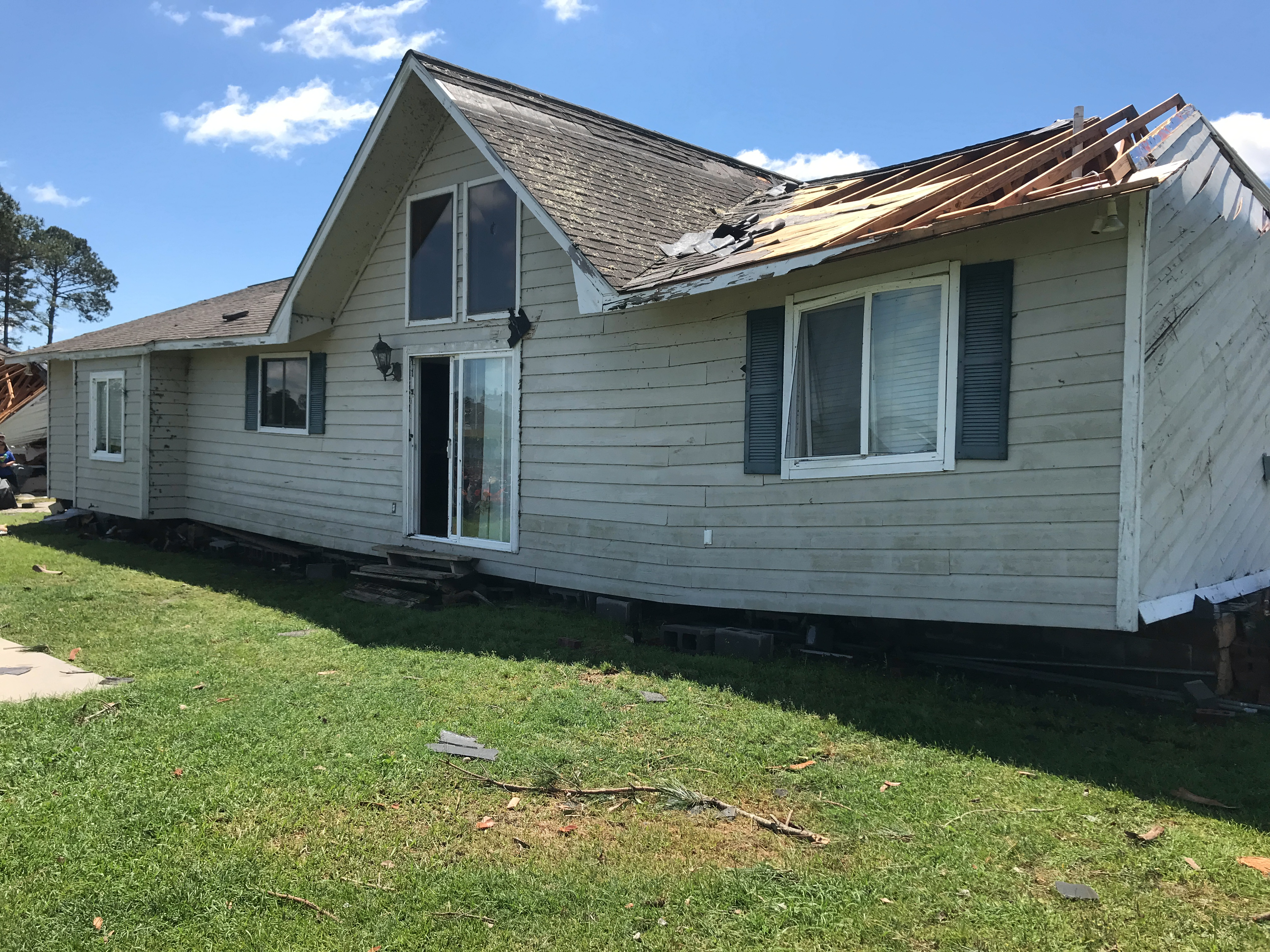
EF2 damage to a home that was shifted off its foundation and sustained partial roof loss southwest of Douglas, Georgia.

Beginning on the afternoon of April 23 into the early morning hours of April 25, severe thunderstorms moved across the Southern United States. Multiple tornadoes were observed in North Texas on April 23, including an EF2 tornado that heavily damaged a farm, snapped power poles, and threw vehicles west of Lockett. Another EF2 tornado snapped many trees and damaged homes southwest of Douglas, Georgia, on April 24, including one that was shifted off of its foundation. Two people were injured when an EF1 tornado flipped a mobile home west of Haleburg, Alabama, as well. A total of 14 tornadoes were confirmed. Severe weather relating to the storm system forced the Atlanta Braves to postpone a Major League Baseball game against the Arizona Diamondbacks.

=== April 27–28 (United States) ===
| EFU | EF0 | EF1 | EF2 | EF3 | EF4 | EF5 |
|---|---|---|---|---|---|---|
| 10 | 8 | 6 | 0 | 1 | 0 | 0 |

On April 21, the SPC issued a 15% risk contour for portions of Texas and Oklahoma. By April 27, a slight risk for severe weather was in place for parts of the Great Plains, mainly due to the threat very large hail. Numerous tornadoes touched down in Colorado and Texas, most of which were weak or remained over open fields. However, one strong multiple-vortex EF3 tornado touched down near Truscott, Texas, tossing a 4,000 lb (1,800 kg) cattle feeder and bending large metal power line pylons to the ground. An early-morning high-end EF1 tornado that hit near Pauls Valley, Oklahoma, on April 28 destroyed multiple barns, sheds, and outbuildings. Another high-end EF1 tornado near Hondo, Texas, destroyed a mobile home and a barn, severely damaged the roof of a house, downed trees and power lines, and toppled a hunting tower. The same supercell also produced a 6.4-inch-diameter (16 cm) hailstone in Hondo, the largest hailstone ever recorded in Texas. Other weak tornadoes touched down that afternoon as well. Three severe hailstorms that day also caused major damage in the suburbs of Fort Worth, Oklahoma City, and San Antonio as well, the third of which came from the Hondo supercell. Overall, 25 tornadoes were confirmed. Damage was at least a billion dollars.

== May ==
=== May 1 (Japan) ===
An EF2 tornado struck Makinohara, Shizuoka Prefecture, Japan, inflicting damage to 97 buildings and causing three minor injuries. Multiple homes had their roofs torn off, many power poles were snapped, garages were destroyed, and semi-trucks were overturned by the tornado. Some industrial buildings were also damaged, and sheet metal was wrapped around power lines.

=== May 2 (Poland) ===
An IF2 tornado embedded within a line of severe thunderstorms caused significant damage in Tereszpol-Zygmunty, Poland. A total of 15 homes were damaged in the small village, including one house that sustained total roof loss and collapse of some second floor exterior walls. Several barns and outbuildings were completely destroyed, with sheet metal debris scattered hundreds of meters through fields outside of town. Vehicles and farm implements were moved and damaged, including a tractor that was lifted and overturned. Power lines and fences were downed, and many trees were snapped or uprooted along the path as well.

=== May 2–4 (United States) ===
| EFU | EF0 | EF1 | EF2 | EF3 | EF4 | EF5 |
|---|---|---|---|---|---|---|
| 10 | 47 | 34 | 6 | 0 | 0 | 0 |

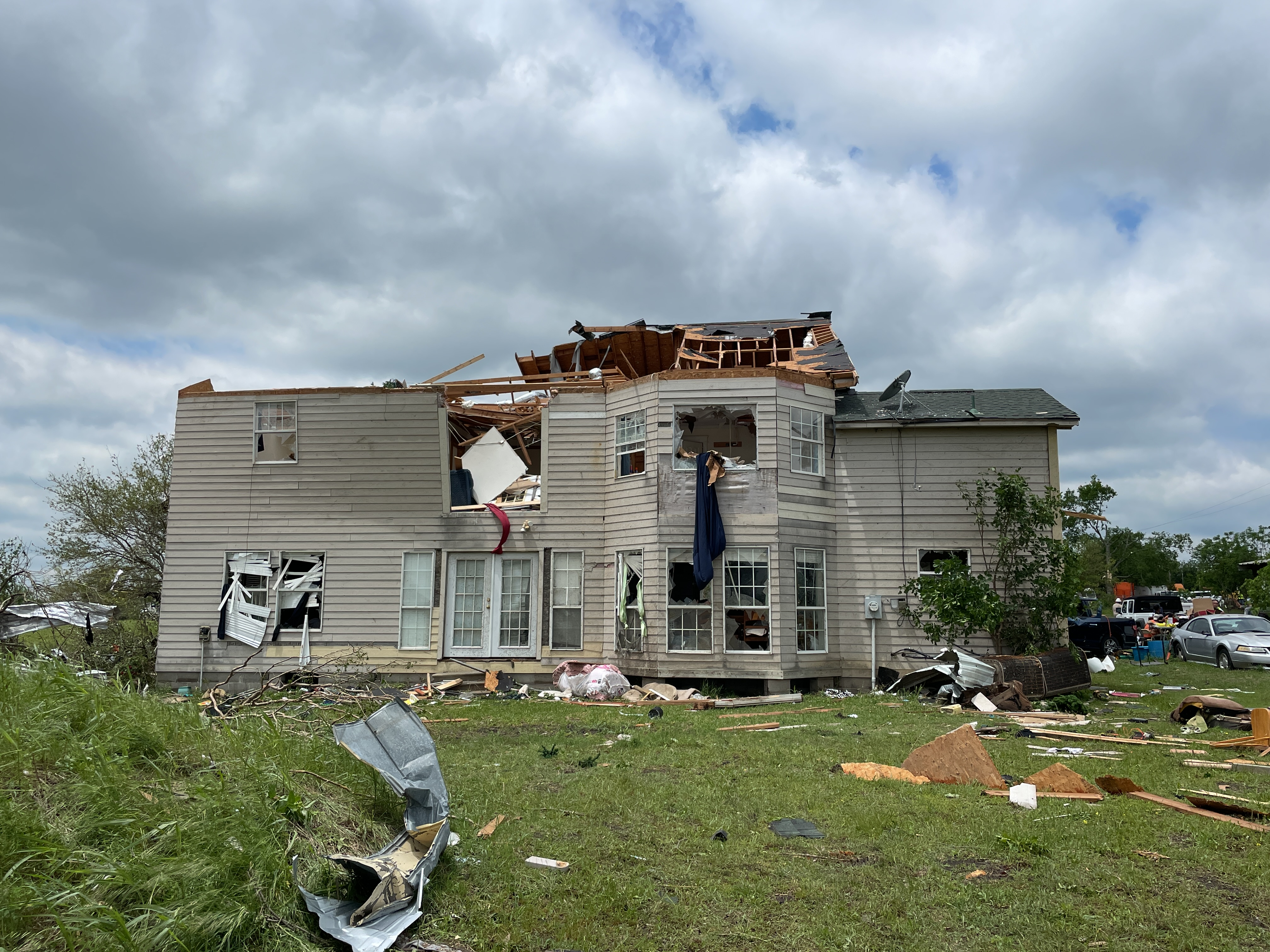
EF2 damage to a two-story house near Waxahachie, Texas.

Two separate zones of severe and tornadic weather struck the Central Plains and Lower Mississippi Valley on May 2. In Mississippi, numerous tornadoes touched down, including a high-end EF1 tornado that struck the south edge of Yazoo City, destroying mobile homes and a billboard, and downing many trees. An EF2 tornado also caused extensive damage to homes and trees south of Coila, Mississippi. Other EF1 tornadoes caused considerable damage in Calhoun City and Tupelo, the latter of which prompted a tornado emergency. That tornado caused damage in neighborhoods near the Elvis Presley Museum. The next day, tornadic activity again affected areas from the Central Plains eastward to the Mid-Atlantic. Two EF1 tornadoes caused considerable damage on the west side of the Atlanta metro during the morning of May 3. That afternoon, a long-tracked, radar-confirmed EF2 tornado caused considerable damage and prompted multiple PDS tornado warnings in northwestern South Carolina near Greenwood. Another EF2 tornado destroyed a manufactured home near Callao, Virginia. An EF1 tornado also destroyed a building in Ranson, West Virginia, injuring one person. Meanwhile, in Texas, an EF2 tornado injured eight near Waxahachie when it flipped vehicles on I-35E and inflicted major damage to homes northeast of there. Another tornado, rated high-end EF2, ripped much of the roof and some walls from a house near Blum. More tornadic and severe weather occurred on May 4, affecting areas from East Texas to Pennsylvania, including an EF2 tornado that caused major damage to a home and tossed a car near Fulton, Kentucky. Overall, 97 tornadoes were confirmed, causing at least 10 injuries. Four non-tornadic fatalities also took place, including two that occurred in Georgia on May 3 due to falling trees.

=== May 14–15 (China) ===
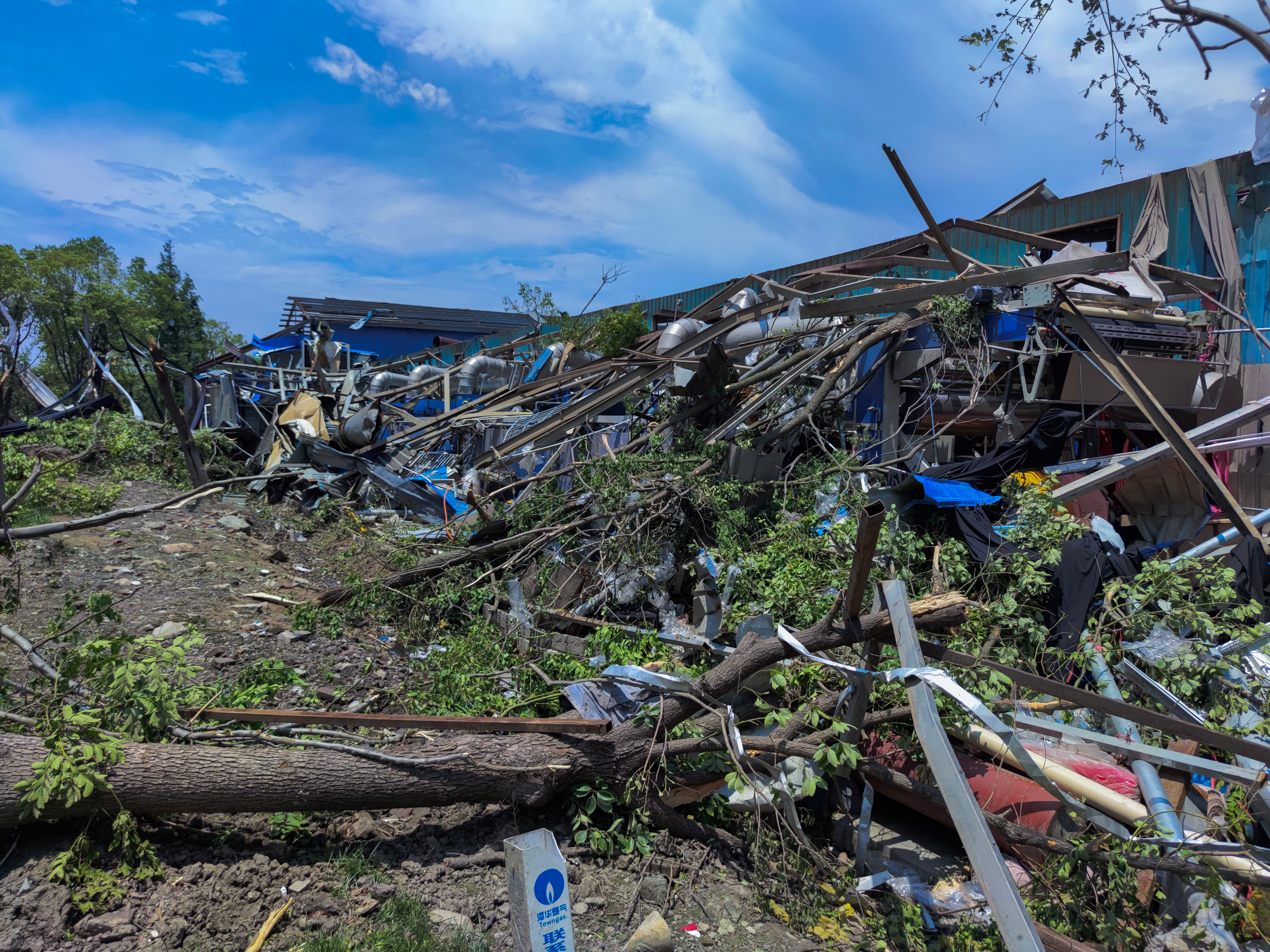
Damage from an EF3 tornado in Shengze, China.

| EFU | EF0 | EF1 | EF2 | EF3 | EF4 | EF5 |
|---|---|---|---|---|---|---|
| 11+ | 0 | 0 | 0 | 2 | 0 | 0 |

Multiple cyclic supercell thunderstorms developed in a very moist, highly sheared, and unstable environment, sparking a significant two-day tornado outbreak across parts of China. At around sunset on the evening of May 14, a large and destructive EF3 tornado ripped directly through the town of Shengze near Shanghai, killing four people and injuring 150 others. Numerous warehouses and industrial buildings in town were damaged or destroyed, along with multiple houses, and large metal truss electrical transmission towers were blown over. Vehicles were also damaged, and trees were snapped and denuded, a few of which sustained debarking. Later that night, another strong EF3 tornado struck the Caidian District of Wuhan, destroying 28 homes and damaging 130 others, killing 10 and injuring 230. Manufacturing plants and industrial buildings were also severely damaged or destroyed, and large construction cranes were toppled to the ground. Many trees and power poles were snapped by the Wuhan tornado as well. Several other damaging tornadoes, some fatal, were reported in other more rural parts of the country, though few details are available. A total of 13 tornadoes were confirmed, along with 15 fatalities and at least 400 injuries. Along with the 13 confirmed tornadoes, several other unconfirmed reports of additional tornadoes were also received. Damage was estimated at $96 million.

=== May 25–26 (India) ===
| FU | F0 | F1 | F2 | F3 | F4 | F5 |
|---|---|---|---|---|---|---|
| 3 | 0 | 0 | 0 | 0 | 0 | 0 |

At least two tornadoes were spawned by the outer bands of Cyclone Yaas in the districts of North 24 Paragana and Hooghly. One tornado was reported in Halishar with another reported in Chinsurah. Two people died with five injured, and 80 houses were damaged. Damage to trees and some businesses occurred as well. On May 26, Another tornado was spotted in Mahakalapada, Kendrapada District

=== May 25 (Canada) ===
| EFU | EF0 | EF1 | EF2 | EF3 | EF4 | EF5 |
|---|---|---|---|---|---|---|
| 0 | 0 | 0 | 4 | 0 | 0 | 0 |

A single supercell thunderstorm produced four low-end EF2 tornadoes, all with winds of around 190 km/h (118 mph) as it tracked from Eastern Ontario into Quebec. One touched down east of Chapleau, Ontario, and the other three touched down in Quebec, west of the city of Val d’Or. All four tornadoes tracked through remote and heavily forested areas, snapping or uprooting countless trees. No injuries were reported.

=== May 26–28 (United States) ===
| EFU | EF0 | EF1 | EF2 | EF3 | EF4 | EF5 |
|---|---|---|---|---|---|---|
| 17 | 8 | 5 | 1 | 0 | 0 | 0 |

An outbreak of tornadoes occurred on May 26 across the Western Great Plains of the United States. A moderate risk for severe weather was issued on the morning of May 26 with a 15% hatched risk of tornadoes, noting the potential of strong tornadoes. A Particularly Dangerous Situation Tornado Watch was issued by the Storm Prediction Center for Northeastern and extreme Eastern Colorado, Western Kansas, and Southwestern Nebraska. That afternoon, a large EF2 tornado touched down in rural Dundy County, Nebraska, north of Benkelman. A large grove of elm trees were completely mowed down, a tractor was thrown 100 yards (91 m), and power poles were snapped as the tornado traveled parallel to N-61. A high-end EF1 tornado also touched down in Rawlins County, Kansas, removing grain silos off of their foundations. Numerous other tornadoes were confirmed that day across Nebraska, Kansas, and Texas. This included an EF0 tornado that struck Perryton, Texas, causing minor damage to a car wash, apartment buildings, and a couple of businesses. As the system moved eastward on May 27, EF1 tornadoes touched down in both Missouri and Oklahoma. Four more tornadoes were confirmed on May 28 in Louisiana, Tennessee, and Texas, including an EF0 tornado that caused two injuries in Livingston, Tennessee, after it heavily damaged a barn. Overall, 31 tornadoes were confirmed, along with two aforementioned injuries.

== June ==
=== June 1 (China) ===
| EFU | EF0 | EF1 | EF2 | EF3 | EF4 | EF5 |
|---|---|---|---|---|---|---|
| ? | 0 | 0 | 1 | 1 | 0 | 0 |

A significant EF3 tornado caused major damage as it struck the town of Shangzhi in Heilongjiang province, damaging or destroying 148 homes. Several large metal chicken houses were completely destroyed at a farm in the area, and farm implements and tractors were thrown. Large swaths of trees were mowed down in rural areas outside of Shangzhi, and metal truss transmission towers were blown over. One person was killed and 16 others were injured by the tornado, which was photographed and caught on video from multiple angles. A separate EF2 tornado also caused considerable damage just north of the path of the main EF3 tornado. A few additional tornadoes also reportedly touched down in other areas of China that afternoon and evening, though the exact number of tornadoes and extent of the damage they produced is not known.

=== June 15 (China) ===
On June 15, a small village near Xuzhou sustained major damage after being directly impacted by a high-end EF2 tornado. Dozens of masonry homes were badly damaged or destroyed, including a few small unanchored homes that were leveled. Trees were snapped and debarked, and farm fields near the village were scoured.

=== June 18 (United States) ===
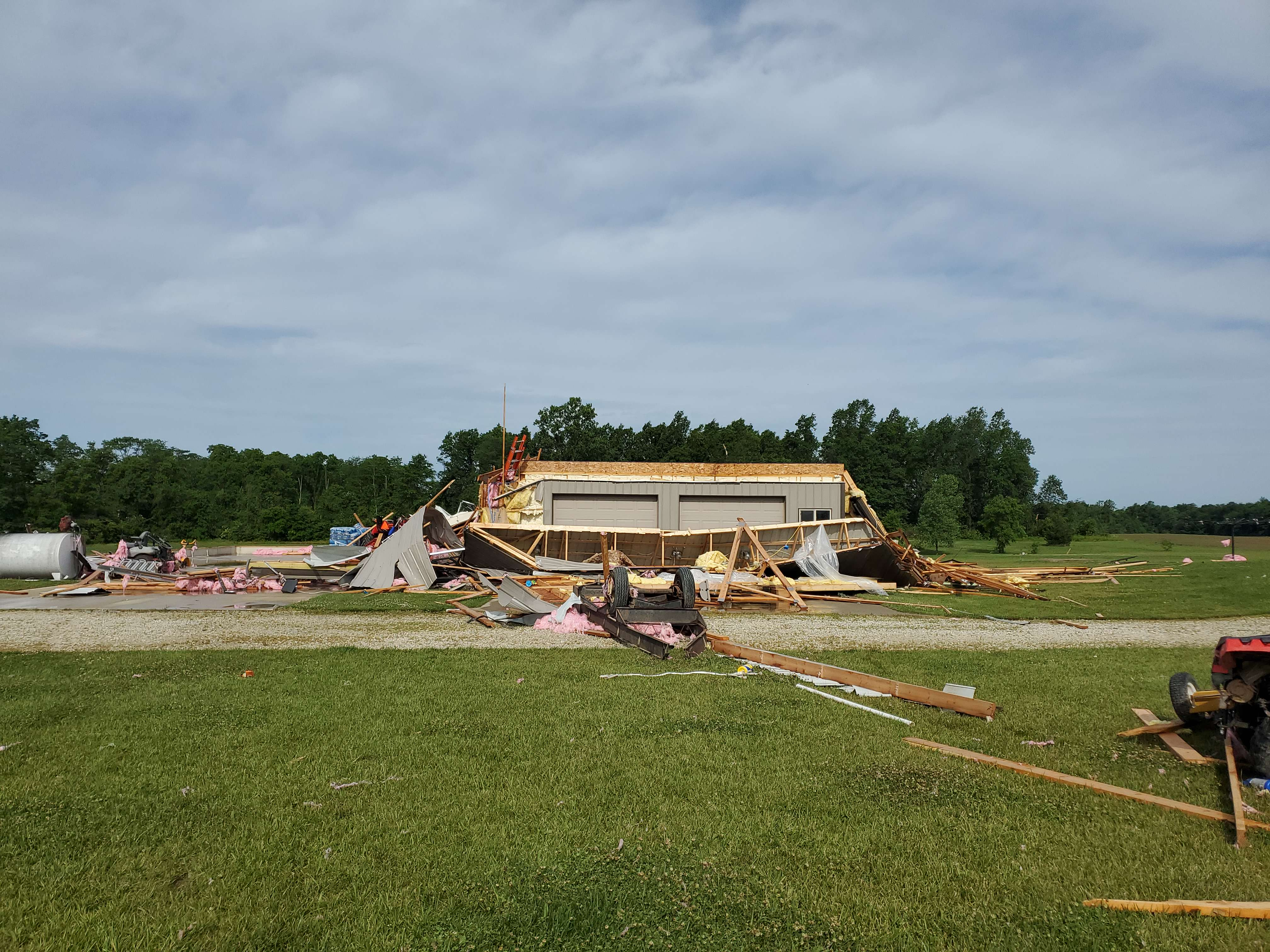
EF2 damage to a garage near Bryant, Indiana.

| EFU | EF0 | EF1 | EF2 | EF3 | EF4 | EF5 |
|---|---|---|---|---|---|---|
| 0 | 0 | 5 | 2 | 0 | 0 | 0 |

Seven tornadoes touched down in Kentucky, Indiana, Ohio, and Illinois as a result of a severe weather outbreak that affected the Ohio Valley region. A damaging EF2 tornado passed near the towns of Bryant and Portland, Indiana, while another EF2 tornado occurred near Fort Recovery, Ohio. Both of these tornadoes struck multiple farmsteads, resulting in extensive damage to homes, barns, outbuildings, trees, and power poles. A high-end EF1 tornado struck the town of Milan, Indiana, downing numerous trees, destroying a garage, and tearing shingles, siding, and gutters from homes. Another EF1 tornado near Moores Hill, Indiana, damaged two homes and downed trees. An EF1 tornado also caused roof and tree damage near Germantown, Ohio, while another EF1 tornado damaged farm buildings, crops, and trees near the town of DeLong, Illinois. Numerous reports of straight-line winds, large hail, and flooding were received as well. Heavy rainfall flooded streets in Bloomington, Indiana and killed one person, while the hail event alone caused $1.9 billion in damage.

=== June 19–20 (Europe) ===
| FU | F0 | F1 | F2 | F3 | F4 | F5 |
|---|---|---|---|---|---|---|
| 6 | 1 | 3 | 2 | 0 | 0 | 0 |

Beginning on June 19, a tornado outbreak affected several countries in Europe. A tornado of unknown intensity that struck the village of Saint-Nicolas-de-Bourgueil, France, was the first tornado of the outbreak. A church in town sustained collapse of its steeple and had severe roof damage. There was roof damage to 50 other buildings, including the village hall. An F1 tornado moved through the northwest suburbs of Reims, causing damage to 40 homes and snapping numerous trees in a wooded area, while another tornado passed near Pontchâteau and caused no damage. Three weak tornadoes were also sighted as they touched down in open fields near La Ferté-Gaucher, Étampes, and Neuvy-en-Beauce, none of which caused any damage. A tornado that was not rated also struck Olne, Belgium, ripping the roof off of a school and damaging the roofs of a few homes. Tornado activity continued on June 20, and an F1 tornado caused damage to structures, vehicles, fences, and trees as it moved through an industrial section of Sundern, Germany. In Moldova, another F1 tornado caused tree and roof damage in the Chetrosu area. Later that night, a strong F2 tornado struck the village of Laloux, Belgium and ripped much of the roof off a large brick church. The top half of the church's steeple was blown off, and a section of the brick wall surrounding the church yard was collapsed. Multiple homes in the village had their roofs torn off, sheds were destroyed, and trees were downed as well. Another damaging F2 tornado impacted Beauraing, located to the southwest of Laloux, and ripped the roofs off of numerous well-built brick homes. A few of these homes sustained damage to the upper portions of their exterior walls, and a sports hall was completely destroyed. Significant damage to trees, power lines, and vehicles also occurred in and around town. The tornado damaged 90 homes in the Beauraing area, dozens of which were left uninhabitable, and injured 17 people. A tornado of unknown intensity also hit the small community of Bras, Belgium, downing trees and damaging roofs. Overall, a total of 12 tornadoes were confirmed as a result of this outbreak.

=== June 19 (New Zealand) ===
On the morning of June 19, a tornado moved through the densely populated Auckland suburb of Papatoetoe, causing extensive damage. A stack of large metal shipping containers was blown over at a freight hub, and a worker was killed at this location after being picked up and thrown by the tornado. Numerous homes sustained severe roof damage and broken windows, and a few houses had large portions of their roofs torn off. A two-story apartment building had its entire roof ripped off, a church building lost a large portion of its roof, vehicles were overturned, and many trees were downed. Power poles were also toppled to the ground, fences were destroyed, and sheet metal was wrapped around power lines. In addition to the fatality, a few people sustained minor injuries, including a two-year-old girl who was struck by a wooden fence board that smashed through a window. A total of 1,200 homes were affected by the tornado, 60 of which were left uninhabitable.

=== June 19–20 (Tropical Storm Claudette) ===
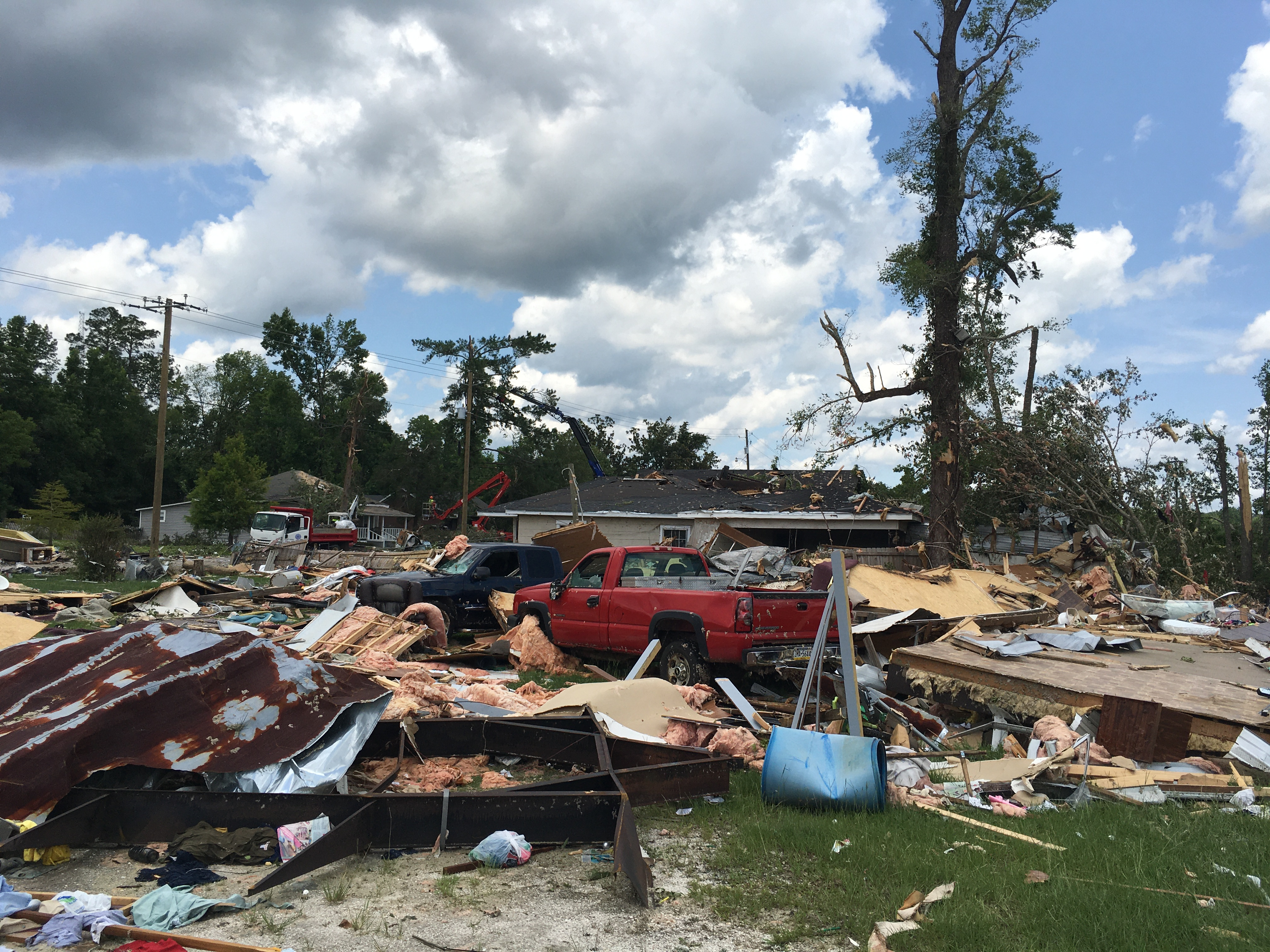
EF2 damage to mobile homes in East Brewton, Alabama.

| EFU | EF0 | EF1 | EF2 | EF3 | EF4 | EF5 |
|---|---|---|---|---|---|---|
| 0 | 6 | 3 | 1 | 0 | 0 | 0 |

Several tornadoes touched down in Mississippi, Alabama, Georgia, and North Carolina, on June 19–20 in association with Tropical Storm Claudette. The most significant tornado of the event was a large and destructive high-end EF2 tornado that struck East Brewton, Alabama, resulting in major damage and 20 injuries, two of which were serious. Multiple mobile homes were obliterated in East Brewton, houses and a school building sustained severe roof damage, and countless large trees were snapped or uprooted along the path. Three EF0 tornadoes also impacted the coastal Mississippi towns of Pass Christian, Pascagoula, and Long Beach, all of which produced mainly tree and roof damage. An EF1 tornado also downed trees and power lines near Hurley. In Georgia, a long-tracked EF1 tornado downed numerous trees, and also caused damage to mobile homes and pump houses as it struck Zetto and passed near Cuthbert along a 30.32 mi-long (48.80 km) path. A total of nine tornadoes were confirmed.

=== June 20–21 (Northern United States and Canada) ===
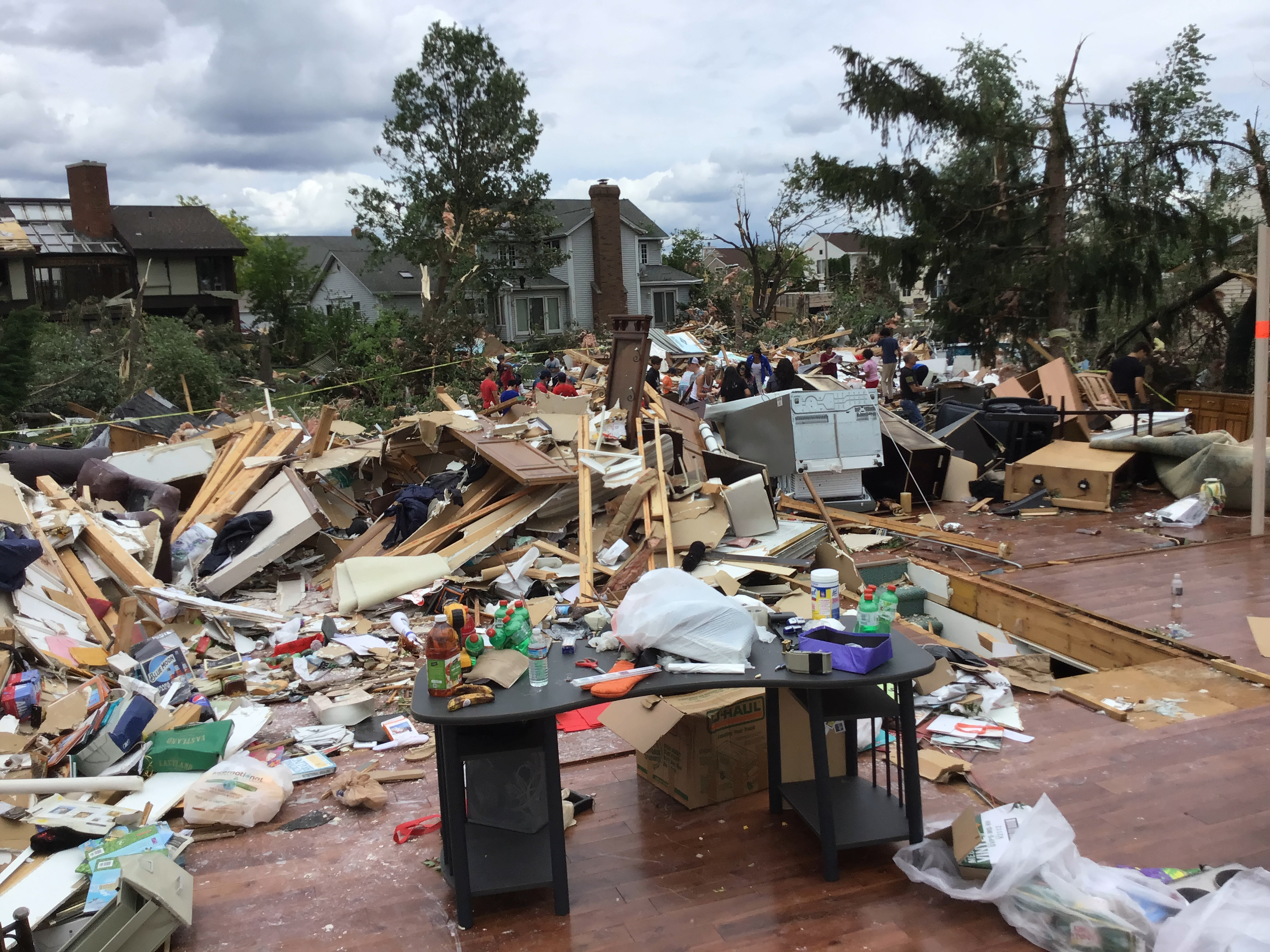
A poorly-anchored house that was leveled by a low-end EF3 tornado on the southeast side of Naperville, Illinois.

| EFU | EF0 | EF1 | EF2 | EF3 | EF4 | EF5 |
|---|---|---|---|---|---|---|
| 0 | 8 | 7 | 1 | 1 | 0 | 0 |

In the evening and overnight hours of June 20, a severe weather outbreak produced damaging winds, large hail, and several tornadoes in Iowa, Illinois, and Indiana, with Illinois being hit the hardest. Two separate EF1 tornadoes caused damage to trees and farmsteads near the Iowa towns of Pella and Garry Owen. The most significant tornado of the event was a destructive low-end EF3 tornado that struck the western Chicago suburbs, causing severe damage in Naperville, Woodridge, and Darien. Many homes were damaged and some were destroyed as the tornado impacted multiple neighborhoods, and many trees and power lines were downed. One poorly anchored home was leveled, and several cars were flipped by the tornado as well. Eleven injuries occurred as a result of the tornado, two of which were critical. At least 22,000+ ComEd customers were affected by power outages in DuPage County during this severe weather event. An EF0 tornado also moved through Plainfield and Romeoville, downing trees and tree limbs. Another EF0 tornado caused tree damage and tore shingles from the roofs of homes near South Haven, Indiana. A complex of damaging straight-line winds with embedded downbursts also damaged roofs throughout Downers Grove, Lemont, Homer Glen, and New Lenox. Additional tornadoes touched down in the very early morning hours of June 21, as an EF1 tornado overturned a box truck and caused damage to some metal buildings in Fremont, Indiana, while another EF1 tornado damaged trees and outbuildings near Wyatt. A few isolated weak tornadoes occurred later that day in Pennsylvania and New York, with several other tornadoes confirmed farther to the north in Canada. The most significant of these was an EF2 tornado that struck the city of Mascouche in southern Quebec, killing one person and leaving a trail of significant damage in its wake. A house was blown off its foundation and severely damaged, another house had its roof torn off, and numerous additional homes and apartment buildings suffered considerable roof damage and had their windows blown out. The tornado also snapped large trees and downed hydro poles. The fatality occurred when a 59-year-old man tried to take shelter in a shed, which was lifted and destroyed by the tornado. Two people also suffered minor injuries. Five other weak tornadoes touched down in southern and southeastern Quebec on this day, including two separate EF0 tornadoes that caused minor tree damage in and around Saint-Elzéar. An EF0 tornado in Saint-Valentin inflicted minor roof damage to a house and a couple of farm buildings, and another EF0 in Saint-Célestin damaged trees, roofs, and a fence. Near Saint-Narcisse-de-Beaurivage, an EF1 tornado destroyed multiple barns and outbuildings, and also damaged a camper. A total of 17 tornadoes were confirmed as a result of this small outbreak, which resulted in one death and 13 injuries.

=== June 24 (Europe) ===
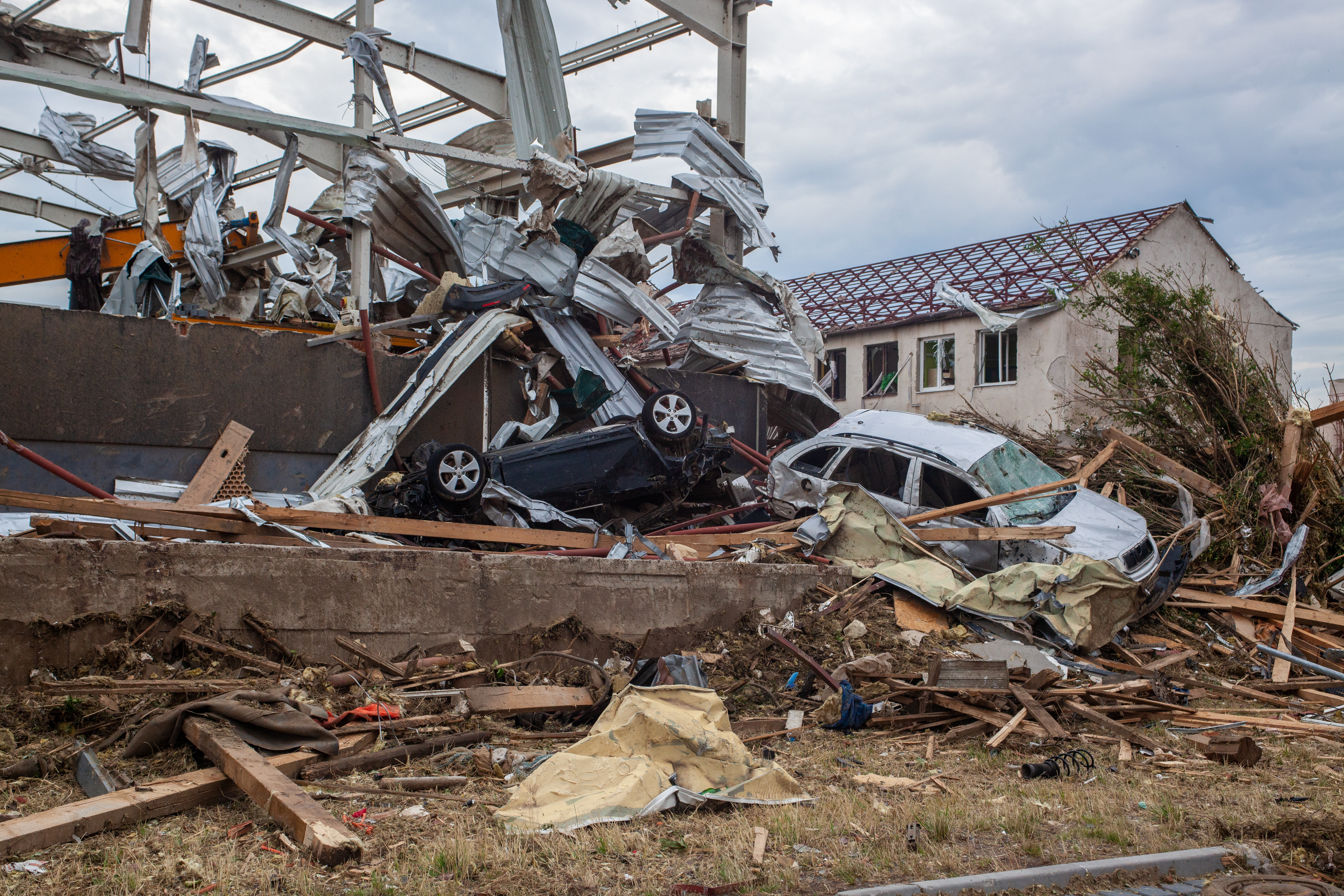
Severe damage to cars and an industrial building as a result of an F4 tornado in Lužice, Czech Republic.

| FU | F0 | F1 | F2 | F3 | F4 | F5 |
|---|---|---|---|---|---|---|
| 3 | 0 | 2 | 1 | 0 | 1 | 0 |

A small but significant tornado outbreak impacted Europe on June 24, producing what was reported as "the worst tornado in modern Czech history", an IF4 tornado that tore through parts of South Moravian Region, Czech Republic, causing six fatalities and at least 200 injuries. The tornado became the widest tornado ever recorded in Europe at 3.5 km. The most severe damage occurred in Hrušky, Moravská Nová Ves, Mikulčice, Lužice, and Hodonín, and the tornado was videoed and photographed from multiple angles. Hundreds of well-built brick homes, apartment buildings, churches, businesses, factories, and warehouses were severely damaged or destroyed, including a few buildings that were leveled. Trees were denuded and debarked, the exterior walls of concrete buildings were scarred and impaled by flying debris, and many vehicles were thrown and mangled. Severed gas and electrical lines resulted in multiple small fires burning in wake of the tornado. Farm fields were scoured, and metal truss towers were collapsed, and large swaths of trees were flattened in rural areas. One third of the buildings in Hrušky were destroyed, and 85% were damaged. In Poland, an F2 tornado caused significant damage as it struck Librantowa and Koniuszowa, injuring one person. Dozens of homes and other structures were damaged in both towns, including 15 buildings that sustained total loss of their roofs. Outbuildings were destroyed, trees were downed, and sheet metal was thrown into fences and power lines. An F1 tornado also damaged the roofs of 20 homes in the Wrzelów area, and another F1 tornado damaged trees and telephone lines near Boronów. In France, a weak tornado briefly touched down near Miribel-les-Échelles, and a tornadic waterspout formed over Lake Peipus in Russia, with neither causing any damage. A tornado was also confirmed in the Kinzenbach, Germany, area, causing no damage as well. The powerful supercells that produced these tornadoes also produced large and destructive hail, some of which was baseball-sized. An intense downburst occurred in the small Czech community of Stebno, Ústí nad Labem Region, resulting in considerable damage. Homes and a church in town sustained major roof damage, trees and power poles were downed, vehicles were damaged, and some older buildings sustained collapse of unreinforced brick walls. A total of seven tornadoes were confirmed.

=== June 25 (China) ===
| EFU | EF0 | EF1 | EF2 | EF3 | EF4 | EF5 |
|---|---|---|---|---|---|---|
| 3 | 0 | 0 | 0 | 1 | 0 | 0 |

On June 25, a single cyclic supercell thunderstorm produced four significant tornadoes in China, two of which were deadly. The first tornado touched down near Baochang in Inner Mongolia before devastating the small village of Jianguo at high-end EF3 strength, completely leveling brick homes, debarking trees, tossing cars and farm implements, producing ground scouring in open fields, and killing at least six people. After the initial tornado dissipated, a second tornado touched down and struck Guyuan in Hebei Province, leveling additional homes and structures, causing major tree damage, and killing two others. A third significant tornado caused severe damage to homes near Fengning in Hebei Province, including some that sustained loss of roofs and exterior walls. A fourth tornado that blew over metal truss transmission towers, ripped roofs off of homes, and downed power poles was also confirmed in a rural area. Only the first tornado was officially rated.

=== June 25–26 (United States and Canada) ===
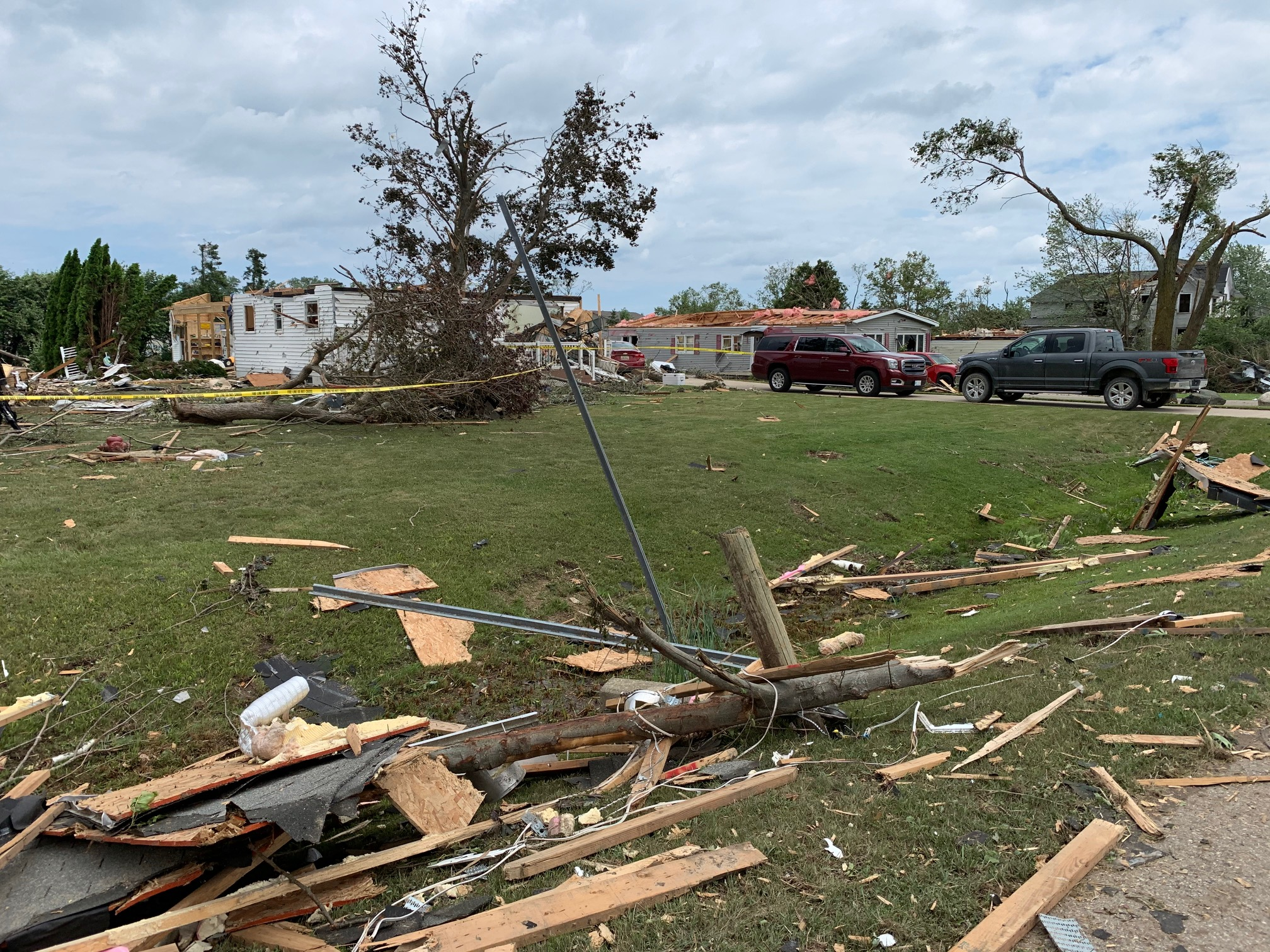
EF2 damage to houses in Port Austin, Michigan.

| EFU | EF0 | EF1 | EF2 | EF3 | EF4 | EF5 |
|---|---|---|---|---|---|---|
| 4 | 14 | 4 | 2 | 0 | 0 | 0 |

An outbreak consisting mostly of short-lived, weak tornadoes impacted the parts of Missouri, Illinois, Indiana, Michigan, and Ontario, though a couple of strong tornadoes occurred as well. On June 25, a large but weak EF1 multiple-vortex tornado struck the town of Danforth, Illinois, damaging grain bins, houses, and trees. On June 26, an EF2 tornado caused significant damage in Port Austin, Michigan, ripping the roofs off of multiple homes, destroying garages and outbuildings, throwing a fifth-wheel trailer, and injuring six people. Two EF0 tornadoes caused minor tree damage in the Chicago Metropolitan Area, one moving through Dyer and Schererville, while the other struck Crete. Another EF0 tornado struck the small town of Chatsworth, Illinois, causing minor damage. In Ontario, an EF2 tornado tracked from near Chatsworth, Ontario, to the Walters Falls area, causing significant damage to barns and the roofs of homes, moving a vehicle, and snapping or uprooting numerous large trees. An EF0 tornado also briefly touched down near Goderich, causing no damage. A total of 24 tornadoes were confirmed. Damage from the storms totaled $1.3 billion.

=== June 27 (Belgium) ===
An F3 tornado was photographed and caught on video directly impacting the small rural community of Bernistap, Belgium. Major damage occurred, as brick homes and other structures had their roofs torn off, a couple of which sustained collapse of exterior walls. A large, historic château was severely damaged in the area, many trees were snapped in wooded areas, and a cow was killed.

== July ==
=== July 1–2 (China) ===
| EFU | EF0 | EF1 | EF2 | EF3 | EF4 | EF5 |
|---|---|---|---|---|---|---|
| 1 | 0 | 0 | 0 | 1 | 0 | 0 |

On the evening of July 1, a damaging tornado struck Guyuan in Hebei Province for the second time in six days, completely destroying multiple small and unreinforced brick homes. Tractors and farm implements were thrown as well. The following day, a large and slow-moving EF3 stovepipe tornado moved through remote, mountainous terrain in Inner Mongolia, completely mowing down large swaths of trees in densely forested areas. Extreme tree damage was noted, with all trees stripped of limbs and bark in the most severely impacted areas, and some were reduced to debarked stumps. Ground scouring occurred, and large metal truss transmission towers were ripped from their footings, thrown, and torn apart as well.

=== July 7–9 (Hurricane Elsa) ===
| EFU | EF0 | EF1 | EF2 | EF3 | EF4 | EF5 |
|---|---|---|---|---|---|---|
| 1 | 8 | 8 | 0 | 0 | 0 | 0 |

The approach and landfall of Hurricane Elsa spawned several tornadoes across the Eastern United States. An isolated EF0 tornado touched down in Columbia County, Florida, on July 7, knocking a tree down onto a house. The next day, a high-end EF1 tornado caused significant damage to industrial buildings in Jacksonville, Florida, and also damaged many trees, homes, and apartment buildings along its path. The same storm then produced another EF1 tornado that caused considerable damage to residences in St. Marys, Georgia, before tossing numerous campers at a RV park near Kings Bay Base, Georgia, injuring 17 people. Another EF1 tornado downed trees and tree limbs in Port Royal, South Carolina, some of which landed on homes. Additional weak tornadoes formed in the Carolinas and Virginia on July 8, including an EF0 tornado that caused minor tree damage in Smithfield, Virginia, and an EF1 tornado that snapped many trees on Edisto Island in South Carolina. Two more impacted New Jersey on July 9, one of which caused EF1 damage to trees, a condominium office, and a picnic shelter in Woodbine. Overall, 17 tornadoes were confirmed.

=== July 11–13 (China) ===
| EFU | EF0 | EF1 | EF2 | EF3 | EF4 | EF5 |
|---|---|---|---|---|---|---|
| 3 | 0 | 1 | 3 | 1 | 0 | 0 |

An outbreak of multiple strong tornadoes that impacted China began on July 11 and continued into July 12, including a large and destructive high-end EF2 tornado that moved through populated areas of Shenxian, resulting in major damage. Many vehicles were tossed, trees sustained debarking, and buildings sustained major structural damage from the tornado. Numerous homes and industrial buildings along the path were damaged or destroyed, and several high-rise apartments and two schools also sustained significant damage. Multiple injuries and fatalities were reported in Shenxian, but no exact figure was released. Another large and intense rain-wrapped EF3 tornado flattened a mile-wide swath of trees in forested areas near Gaotang, including some trees that were denuded and debarked. The tornado threw vehicles and snapped concrete power poles before moving into more populated areas of Gaotang, causing severe damage to homes and other structures. In Binzhou, a tornado snapped concrete power poles, damaged industrial buildings, flipped vehicles, and destroyed several manufactured homes. Major damage and at least one fatality was also reported in the Zhanhua area, where another apparent strong tornado completely destroyed several brick homes and a furniture factory. On July 13, tornadic activity continued as a large wedge tornado moved through areas near Zalantun, causing significant damage in several villages. Most of the tornadoes that occurred as a result of this outbreak were never officially rated, though analysis indicated that several of them produced damage consistent with at least EF2 or EF3 strength. Officially, only eight tornadoes were confirmed. One fatality and at least 11 tornadoes were confirmed as a result of this outbreak, though many other tornadoes and fatalities are suspected to have occurred.

=== July 14–15 (United States and Canada) ===
| EFU | EF0 | EF1 | EF2 | EF3 | EF4 | EF5 |
|---|---|---|---|---|---|---|
| 11 | 4 | 9 | 7 | 1 | 0 | 0 |

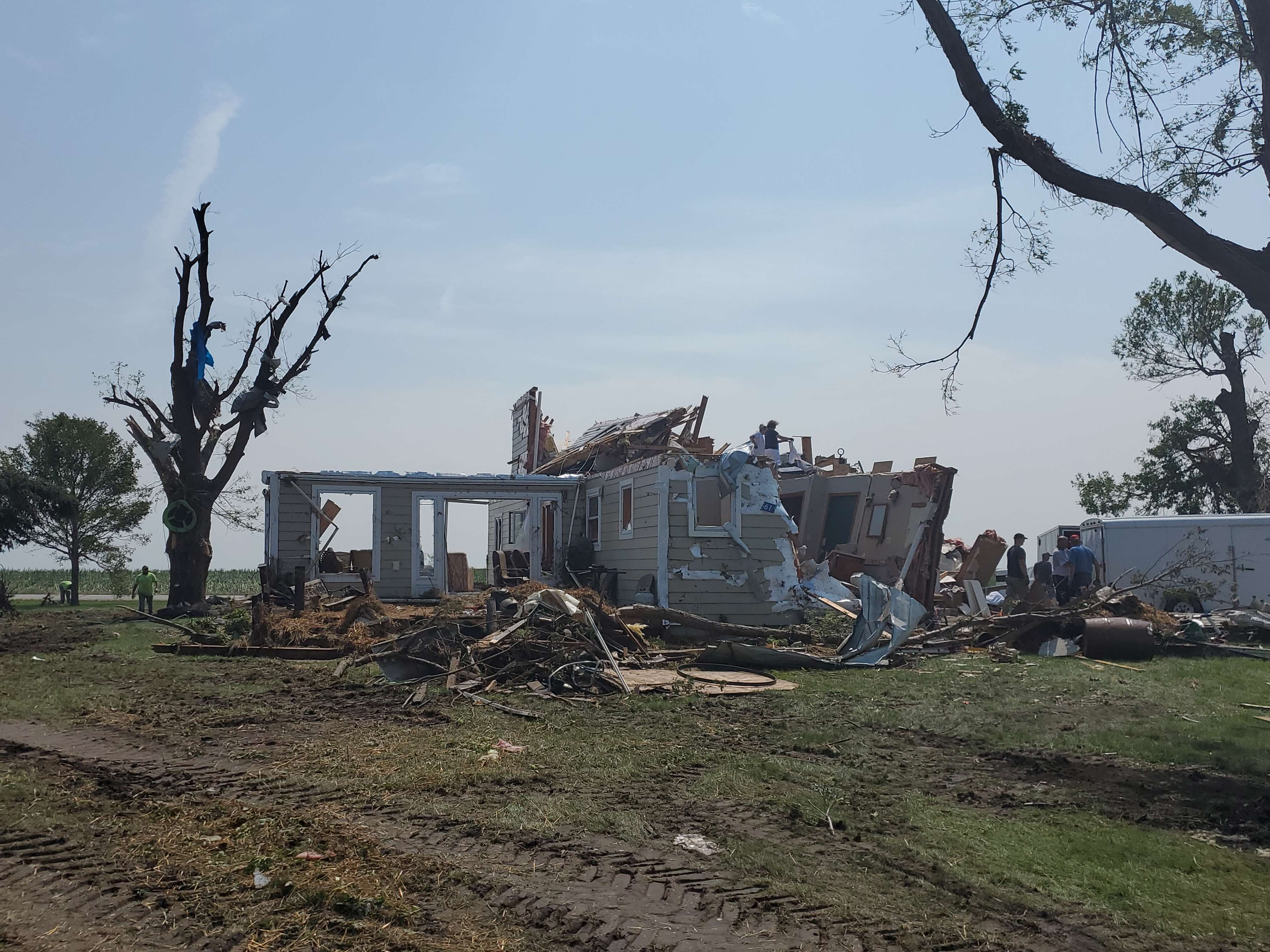
EF3 damage to a home at a farmstead near Lake City, Iowa.

On July 14, an outbreak of mostly weak tornadoes struck the US state of Iowa, with at least 26 tornadoes being confirmed in the state. A tornado watch was issued for northern Iowa at 2:35 pm CDT, and numerous tornadic supercells moved through central and eastern portions of the state. The most significant tornado of the outbreak was a large multiple-vortex EF3 tornado that destroyed a farmstead near Lake City, Iowa, and caused damage to a bus shed, trees, power lines, and the roofs of homes in the town itself. An EF2 tornado caused substantial damage to trees, power lines, and farm buildings near Waverly. An EF1 tornado destroyed outbuildings and inflicted roof damage to homes in the town of Dysart, and other EF1 tornadoes caused minor to moderate damage to crops and farms as they passed near Readlyn, Shell Rock, and Stanhope, Iowa. An EF0 tornado caused tree, roof, and siding damage in Oelwein as well. The next day, the weather system moved northeastward into Canada and produced six EF2 tornadoes and one EF1 tornado in Ontario, along with one EF1 tornado in Quebec. The most significant tornado of the day was a high-end EF2 tornado that impacted Barrie, where significant damage to many homes occurred in residential areas of town. Multiple homes had their roofs torn off, and a few sustained some loss of their second floor exterior walls. Trees were downed and cars were flipped by the tornado as well. A total of 71 homes were left uninhabitable due to the tornado. Ten people were injured in Barrie, a few seriously. An EF1 tornado was confirmed between Chalk River and Petawawa, causing tree damage along its path, while another EF1 tornado was confirmed near Sheenboro, Quebec. A strong EF2 tornado injured one person and severely damaged a brick farmhouse near Little Britain, which had its roof ripped off and also sustained some collapse of its upper exterior walls. Near Lorneville, another EF2 tornado carved a 13 km long damage path, downing trees and destroying barns and farm outbuildings. Two EF2 tornadoes also tracked through remote areas near Dwight and Lake Traverse, snapping and uprooting numerous trees. The sixth EF2 tornado was confirmed near Sunbeam Lake in Algonquin Provincial Park, downing a swath of trees and injuring two campers. A total of 32 tornadoes were confirmed as a result of this outbreak, which caused 13 injuries. The tornadoes in Canada caused $100 million in damage. Meanwhile, the tornadoes in Iowa caused $4.183 million in damage.

=== July 21 (China) ===
A damaging high-end EF2 tornado struck the Donglü section of Baoding in Hebei Province on July 21, killing two people and injuring six people. Many homes and businesses were badly damaged or destroyed by the strong tornado. Multiple factory buildings sustained significant structural damage or had their roofs torn off, and at least one was destroyed. Courtyard walls were blown over, and gas lines and telephone poles were broken. Reports of hail and damaging straight-line winds were also received in the area.

=== July 28–29 (Midwestern and Eastern United States) ===
| EFU | EF0 | EF1 | EF2 | EF3 | EF4 | EF5 |
|---|---|---|---|---|---|---|
| 0 | 19 | 22 | 4 | 1 | 0 | 0 |

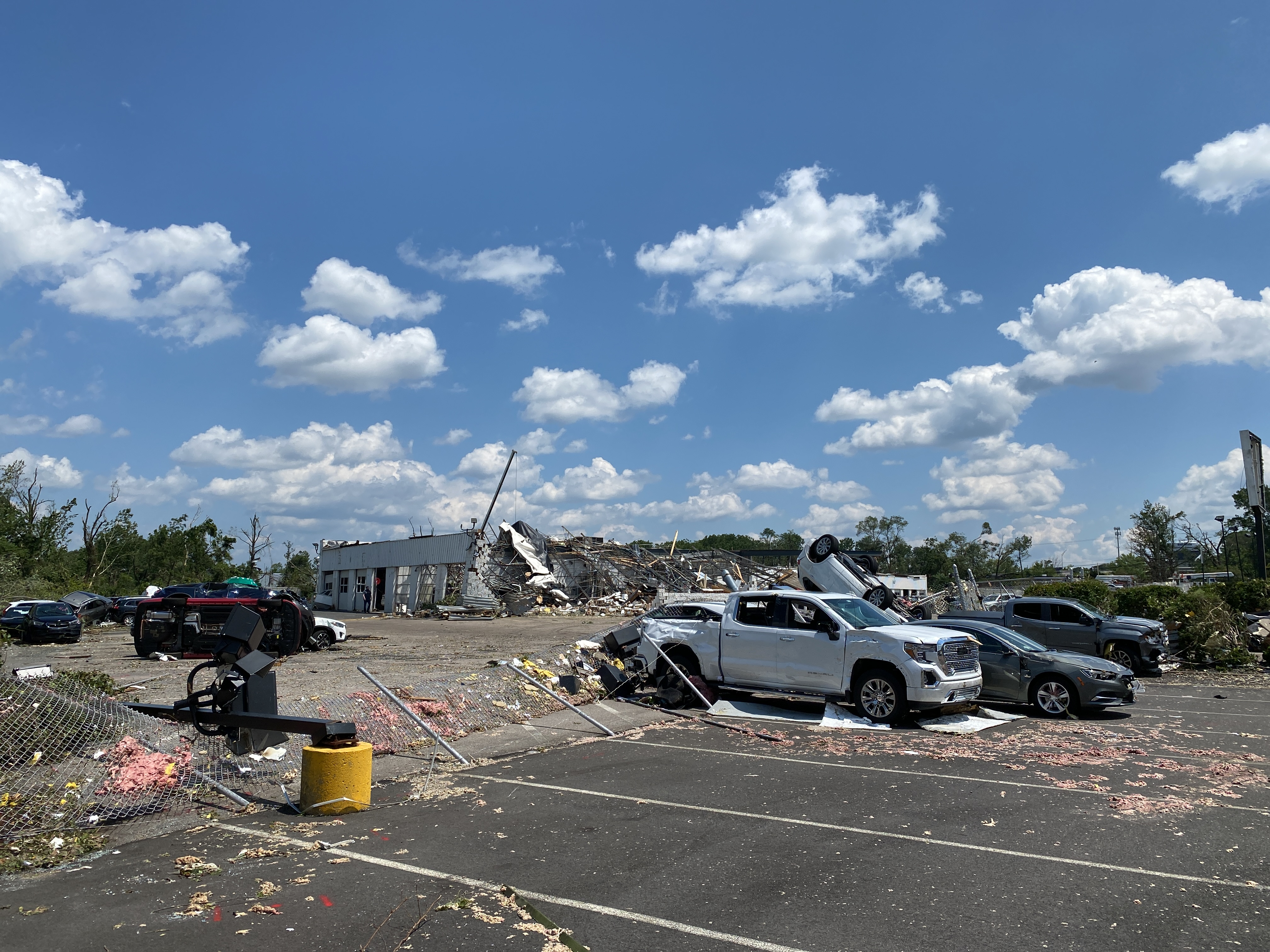
Flipped vehicles and EF3 damage to the Faulkner auto dealership in Trevose, Pennsylvania.

A significant severe weather and tornado outbreak severely impacted portions of the Northern United States in late July 2021. On July 28, the SPC issued moderate risk for severe weather for parts of the Great Lakes region, highlighting the potential for a major damaging straight-line wind event. A secondary threat for embedded tornadoes was also present, and a 10% risk area for tornadoes was outlined. An intense linear mesoscale convective system formed during the overnight hours of July 28 into the early morning hours of July 29, producing widespread damaging winds across Wisconsin before moving south into northern Illinois and Indiana. Countless trees and power lines were downed, structures were damaged, and more than 130,000 homes and businesses were without power in Wisconsin and Illinois following the passage of the damaging line of storms. A motorist near Ripon, Wisconsin, was killed after crashing into a fallen tree and power line. The severe weather forced a nighttime airshow at the Experimental Aircraft Association's EAA AirVenture Oshkosh to be postponed until Thursday, and most activities at the event shut down earlier than planned on Wednesday. 14 weak tornadoes embedded within the line of storms touched down in Wisconsin overnight, causing extensive tree and roof damage along their paths. Two of these tornadoes caused EF1 damage in the Madison suburbs of West Middleton and Verona. An EF1 tornado also caused considerable damage to homes, trees, and power poles in and around the small community of Concord. Two other EF1 tornadoes occurred near Dousman, where docks and boats were damaged at a small lake, and trees and homes were damaged as well. Later on July 29, 2021, the SPC issued an enhanced risk for portions of the Mid Atlantic with a slight risk extending back through the Ohio Valley. This included a 5% risk of tornadoes, as a moderately sheared but extremely moist and unstable airmass was in place across the region. Multiple tornadic supercells formed in the Ohio Valley during the afternoon, and spread eastward across the Mid-Atlantic later that evening, producing numerous tornadoes. Some of the tornadoes were strong and damaging, including an EF2 tornado that caused heavy damage to homes, outbuildings, power poles, and trees in New Athens, Ohio. Another EF2 tornado destroyed a metal shed, caused major tree damage, and completely deforested a wooded hillside near Salineville. In Wintersville, an EF1 tornado damaged a church, one business, and 23 homes. An EF2 tornado snapped and uprooted many large hardwood trees, and triggered a PDS tornado warning as it tracked from near New Hope, Pennsylvania, to Titusville, New Jersey. In the Philadelphia suburbs, a destructive low-end EF3 tornado struck Trevose and Bensalem, Pennsylvania, causing major damage to multiple car dealership buildings and a mobile home park, flipping cars, and injuring five people. An anticyclonic EF0 tornado also briefly touched down in the Philadelphia neighborhood of Bustleton, causing minor damage to trees, an apartment building, and a few other structures. A damaging EF2 tornado moved through High Bar Harbor, New Jersey, later that night, tearing the roofs off of multiple homes, tossing boats and a boat trailer, snapping many trees and power poles, and causing eight minor injuries. Many other weak tornadoes were confirmed in Illinois, Indiana, Ohio, Pennsylvania, New Jersey and Maryland. Overall, 46 tornadoes were confirmed as a result of this outbreak.

== August ==
=== August 2 (Europe) ===
| FU | F0 | F1 | F2 | F3 | F4 | F5 |
|---|---|---|---|---|---|---|
| 0 | 0 | 16 | 3 | 1 | 0 | 0 |

On August 2, a significant tornado outbreak affected Eastern Europe, including a couple of strong, damaging tornadoes that caused fatalities. Ten tornadoes occurred in Tver Oblast, Russia, the most significant of which was an F3 tornado that caused major damage in Andreapol, killing three people and injuring 10 others. Sixty-five homes were damaged or destroyed in town, structural debris was scattered throughout residential areas, large trees were snapped and denuded, power lines were downed, and vehicles were damaged. Outside of Andreapol, a wide path of trees was flattened as the tornado moved through remote forested areas. An F2 tornado struck the small village of Rogozha, damaging homes and outbuildings, killing one person, and injuring four others. A small and poorly anchored building was pushed off of its foundation and destroyed, and countless large trees were snapped in and around the village as well. Two additional F2 tornadoes occurred in very remote areas near the towns of Zabor'ye and Glazuny as well, and cut paths of significant tree damage through areas of dense forest. A tornado also impacted the village of Kartun', causing F1 tree and roof damage. The five other tornadoes that occurred in Tver Oblast were also rated F1, and downed numerous trees and tree limbs near the small villages of Kononovo, Zaplav’ye, Krasukha, Zarech'ye, and Zabor’ye. Five additional F1 tornadoes also caused tree damage in unpopulated areas of Pskov Oblast. In Belarus, a high-end F1 tornado inflicted considerable roof damage to homes and apartment buildings in Rasony, where one person was injured by a falling tree. A rooftop radio tower was blown over at an apartment building as well. Four other F1 tornadoes also downed numerous trees in more rural areas of Belarus that afternoon, including one that was caught on video near Strubki. A total of 20 tornadoes and four fatalities were confirmed as a result of this outbreak.

=== August 7 (United States) ===
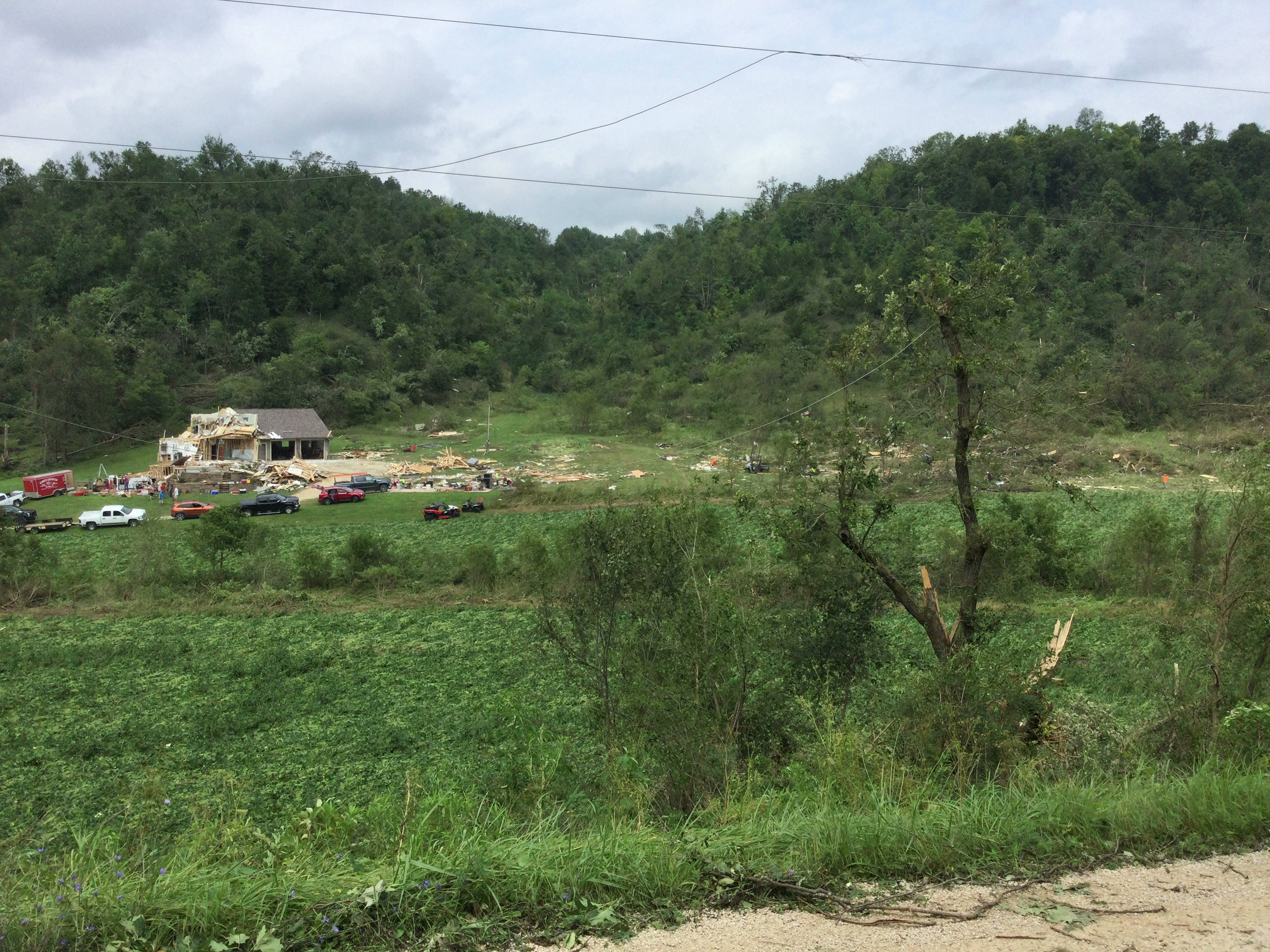
High-end EF3 damage to a house east of Boscobel, Wisconsin.

| EFU | EF0 | EF1 | EF2 | EF3 | EF4 | EF5 |
|---|---|---|---|---|---|---|
| 0 | 0 | 1 | 0 | 1 | 0 | 0 |

During the early evening hours of August 7, an isolated supercell thunderstorm produced a tornado that touched down and moved through the southern edge of Boscobel, Wisconsin, causing minor to moderate roof and tree damage in town. The tornado strengthened and widened significantly as it moved east of town, reaching high-end EF3 intensity and damaging or destroying multiple homes, barns, and outbuildings. Power poles were snapped, and many trees were snapped and denuded by the tornado. After the tornado dissipated, the same parent supercell spawned an EF1 tornado that caused damage to trees and two barns near Highland.

=== August 9 (United States) ===
| EFU | EF0 | EF1 | EF2 | EF3 | EF4 | EF5 |
|---|---|---|---|---|---|---|
| 4 | 7 | 8 | 1 | 0 | 0 | 0 |

A small outbreak of mostly weak tornadoes occurred across an area extending from North Dakota to northern Illinois during the afternoon and evening of August 9. An EF1 tornado and two EF0 tornadoes were caught on video by multiple storm chasers as they impacted multiple farms near Sycamore, Illinois, damaging or destroying numerous outbuildings, and inflicting roof damage to homes. An EF1 tornado also damaged several farms near Arlington, Illinois, as well. In McHenry, a brief EF1 tornado caused significant roof damage at a townhouse complex in the northern part of town. The strongest tornado of the outbreak was a low-end EF2 tornado that snapped or uprooted numerous hardwood trees, and completely destroyed a barn near Sharon, North Dakota. An EF1 tornado also caused damage to farm homes, barns, and trees near Davidson, Minnesota, Minnesota. A total of 20 tornadoes were confirmed.

=== August 11 (Canada) ===
| EFU | EF0 | EF1 | EF2 | EF3 | EF4 | EF5 |
|---|---|---|---|---|---|---|
| 0 | 0 | 1 | 3 | 0 | 0 | 0 |

Four tornadoes were confirmed in Ontario on August 11. An EF1 tornado touched down near Urquhart Lake, while three EF2 tornadoes occurred near the rural communities of Dunns Valley, Kynoch, and Blinko Lake. All four tornadoes moved through remote forested areas, snapping or uprooting numerous trees along their paths.

=== August 16 (Europe) ===
| FU | F0 | F1 | F2 | F3 | F4 | F5 |
|---|---|---|---|---|---|---|
| 0 | 1 | 1 | 1 | 0 | 0 | 0 |

A strong F2 tornado struck the small town of Berumerfehn, Germany, and caused extensive damage. A total of 50 homes were damaged in and around town, including some homes that sustained severe damage and significant loss of their roof structures. Vehicles were overturned, and many trees were snapped or uprooted along the path. A tornadic waterspout also came ashore in Juist, causing F1 damage as a small shack was destroyed, trees and tree limbs were damaged, and pieces of beach furniture were lofted and thrown. In Denmark, an F0 tornado damaged a roof, a greenhouse, trampolines, fences, and trees near Næsby.

=== August 17–19 (Tropical Storm Fred) ===
| EFU | EF0 | EF1 | EF2 | EF3 | EF4 | EF5 |
|---|---|---|---|---|---|---|
| 0 | 18 | 13 | 0 | 0 | 0 | 0 |

An outbreak of weak tornadoes, associated with Tropical Storm Fred, impacted the Eastern United States. Eight tornadoes struck Georgia and thirteen struck the Carolinas on August 17, causing mostly minor property damage. An EF1 tornado caused shingle and tree damage in Americus, Georgia, while trees were downed and homes sustained roof and siding damage from another EF1 tornado in Mauldin, South Carolina. Homes were severely damaged by falling trees and outbuildings were destroyed by two EF1 tornadoes that passed near Carey and Danielsville, Georgia, as well. Eight more weak tornadoes touched down in Pennsylvania and New Jersey on August 18 and in the early morning hours of August 19. This included an EF1 tornado that downed many trees, some of which landed on cars, and damaged the roof of a house in Tilden Township, Pennsylvania. An EF0 tornado also caused minor roof damage in Valley View. Later on August 19, a few more EF0 tornadoes touched down in Connecticut and Massachusetts before the outbreak came to and end. A total of 31 tornadoes were confirmed.

=== August 25 (China) ===
On August 25, an EF2 tornado touched down in the city of Huludao in Liaoning Province, China. The narrow but strong tornado downed power lines, snapped or uprooted large trees, and damaged multiple homes and apartment buildings, some of which sustained shattered windows and had roofing torn off. Brick fencing was blown over, and projectiles were driven into the exterior walls of structures as well.

=== August 23 (Canada) ===
| EFU | EF0 | EF1 | EF2 | EF3 | EF4 | EF5 |
|---|---|---|---|---|---|---|
| 0 | 1 | 0 | 1 | 0 | 0 | 0 |

An EF2 tornado touched down near Hodgeville, Saskatchewan, heavily damaging a farm. Another tornado was confirmed east of Kindersley and was given an EF0 rating. No injuries were reported.

=== August 29 – September 2 (Hurricane Ida) ===
The remnants of Ida producing tornadoes and flash flooding in the Northeastern United States.

| EFU | EF0 | EF1 | EF2 | EF3 | EF4 | EF5 |
|---|---|---|---|---|---|---|
| 0 | 22 | 10 | 3 | 1 | 0 | 0 |

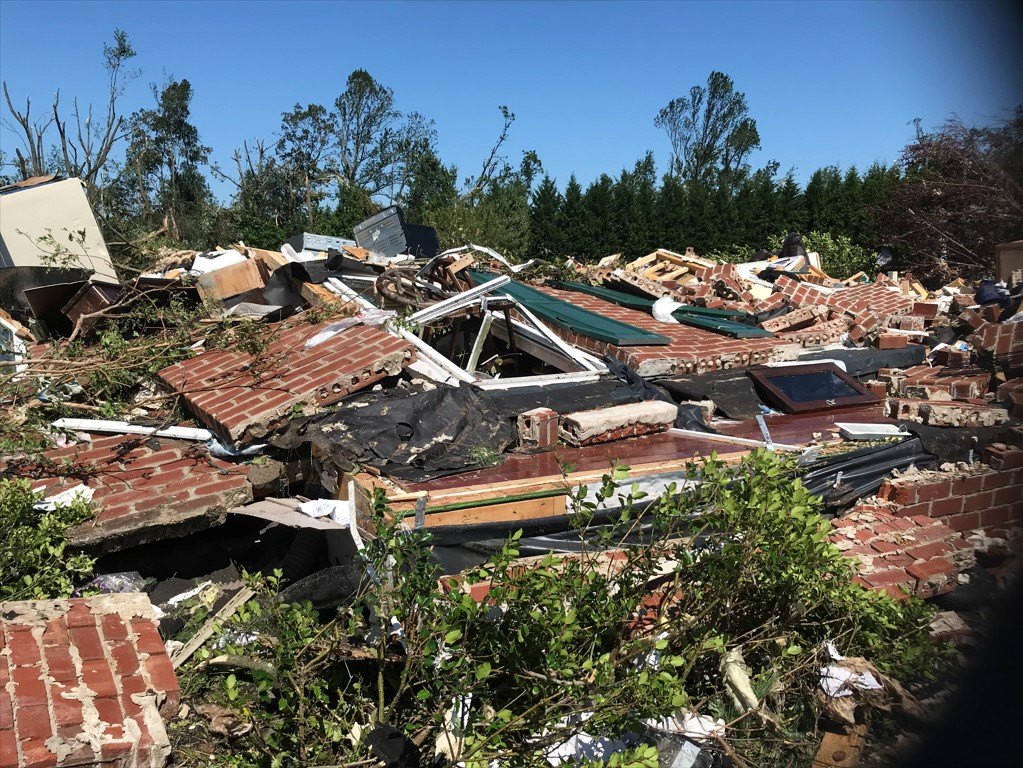
EF3 damage to a home in Mullica Hill, New Jersey.

A tornado outbreak occurred from Mississippi to Massachusetts due to Hurricane Ida. It started in the Southeastern United States as numerous weak tornadoes touched down between August 29–31. On August 30, an EF1 tornado in Saraland, Alabama, caused considerable damage to two hotels and an industrial building, injuring two people. The most significant day of the outbreak was September 1, as 10 tornadoes struck the Northeastern United States, a few of which were strong. New Jersey, Maryland, and Eastern Pennsylvania were particularly hard-hit, a region that had sustained significant damage from another outbreak that occurred just over a month prior. An EF2 tornado caused severe damage in Annapolis, Maryland, where homes and businesses had their roofs torn off and many trees and power lines were downed. Another EF2 tornado moved through a residential neighborhood in Oxford, Pennsylvania, causing extensive damage to homes. One person was killed and at least five others were injured due to a strong rain-wrapped EF2 tornado that moved through the Philadelphia suburbs of Fort Washington, Upper Dublin, and Maple Glen, flipping vehicles and leaving a path of significant damage to trees and structures. The strongest and most destructive tornado of the outbreak was a large EF3 tornado that struck Mullica Hill, New Jersey, destroying multiple homes and a large dairy farm. The same storm later dropped an EF1 tornado that prompted a tornado emergency for Burlington, New Jersey, and Croydon, and Bristol, Pennsylvania, the first of its kind in the Northeast, as well as the first such alert associated with a tropical cyclone. On September 2, a final weak EF0 tornado caused minor damage in Dennis, Massachusetts, before the outbreak came to an end. A total of 35 tornadoes were confirmed as a result of this outbreak, causing one fatality and 7 injuries.

== September ==
=== September 6–7 (Canada) ===
| EFU | EF0 | EF1 | EF2 | EF3 | EF4 | EF5 |
|---|---|---|---|---|---|---|
| 0 | 3 | 0 | 2 | 0 | 0 | 0 |

A few tornadoes, two of which were strong, impacted parts of Ontario in early September. On September 6, at 4:05 am EST (08:05 UTC), an EF0 tornado hit Port Albert, damaging trees. The next day, two large EF2 tornadoes caused considerable damage in Southern Ontario. The first, and most significant, was a large, multiple-vortex EF2 wedge tornado that occurred near Lucknow, and grew to a peak width of 1.3 kilometres (1,400 yd) wide. This strong rain-wrapped tornado was spawned by a large high-precipitation supercell thunderstorm, and first developed over Lake Huron before moving ashore, causing extensive tree and structural damage from Kingsbridge to south of Lucknow. Many large trees were downed along the path, and outbuildings were destroyed, with sheet metal debris from the structures scattered across fields. A second EF2 tornado was confirmed near Kenilworth. It grew to a width of 1.2 kilometres (1,300 yd) wide as it impacted a farm, took the top off of a silo, and caused severe tree damage. The last two tornadoes of the day were both given an EF0 rating, and they occurred near Goderich and in the city of Vaughan, causing tree damage. A total of five tornadoes were confirmed. In addition to these tornadoes, straight-line winds from downbursts caused considerable damage in several other communities in Ontario as well.

=== September 10 (Italy) ===
A strong, rain-wrapped tornadic waterspout moved ashore and caused severe damage in the northern part of Pantelleria, an island in the Strait of Sicily. Several well-built masonry homes had their roofs torn off, and a few sustained partial collapse of their upper exterior walls. 10 cars were thrown and severely damaged or destroyed, multiple trees were snapped, and light poles were knocked down. Roads were blocked by debris, and signs were blown over as well. Two people died when they were thrown from their cars and nine others were injured, including four serious injuries. The tornado was given an F2 rating.

=== September 19 (Italy) ===
| IFU | IF0 | IF0.5 | IF1 | IF1.5 | IF2 | IF2.5 | IF3 | IF4 | IF5 |
|---|---|---|---|---|---|---|---|---|---|
| 0 | 0 | 1 | 2 | 0 | 0 | 4 | 0 | 0 | 0 |

A localized outbreak of seven tornadoes spawned by multiple severe supercell thunderstorms struck northern Italy during the afternoon of September 19. The first tornado of the outbreak was an IF1 tornado that struck the town of Roncaro, where numerous homes, businesses, and apartment buildings sustained damage to roofs, gutters, and balconies. Trees, light poles, and fences were blown over in town as well, and vehicles had their windows shattered. After the first tornado dissipated, a narrow but strong tornado produced IF2.5 damage in Corte Palasio as it inflicted severe roof damage to multiple homes and struck a large masonry outbuilding, which had its roof torn off and sustained exterior wall loss. An IF0.5 tornado also downed small trees and tree limbs, and partially removed the roof of a mausoleum at a cemetery in Settimo Milanese. The next three tornadoes were spawned by a single, long tracked cyclical supercell, with the first one causing IF1 damage in the town of Soresina, where a large industrial building had windows blown out and sustained considerable roof damage, with debris strewn long distances through nearby fields. A sports complex was damaged as well, and damage to trees, fences, roof tiles, and power lines also occurred. After moving away from Soresina, the same parent supercell thunderstorm produced a large, destructive IF2.5 stovepipe tornado that caused significant damage in the small village of Bettegno, located near Pontevico. Streets in Bettegno were left covered in debris as multiple large brick buildings sustained major structural damage, including roof loss and collapse of exterior walls. Trees and power lines were downed in the area, and a few masonry outbuildings were completely destroyed as well. After the Bettegno tornado dissipated, the cyclic supercell thunderstorm produced a third tornado. This large IF2.5 cone tornado ripped the roofs off of several brick farm homes near Carpenedolo, including one that sustained partial loss of its upper exterior walls. The last tornado, also rated IF2.5, was spawned by a separate supercell thunderstorm and hit a small airport north of Carpi, badly damaging or destroying hangars and other structures on the property. Several small airplanes were thrown and destroyed, and vehicles were damaged by flying debris. A farmstead near the airport also sustained significant damage. No injuries were reported with any of the tornadoes.

=== September 29 (Germany) ===
| FU | F0 | F1 | F2 | F3 | F4 | F5 |
|---|---|---|---|---|---|---|
| 1 | 0 | 1 | 0 | 0 | 0 | 0 |

An F1 tornado passed through several districts of Kiel, damaging the roofs of homes and downing trees and tree limbs along its path. The tornado originated in Kiel-Meimersdorf and covered a distance of 14.5 kilometres (9.0 mi) within 31 minutes before dissipating near the village of Pries. The tornado was photographed and caught on video from multiple angles as it moved through Kiel, and at one point became a tornadic waterspout as it moved across Kieler Förde, where a rowing team had to be rescued after their rowboat was thrown into the air and completely destroyed, tossing multiple people into the water. Seven people were injured, four of them severely, as the tornado passed through the port area of the city, where several people were struck by debris and blown into the water. A small satellite waterspout was observed over the water during this time, though it dissipated before reaching land.

=== September 30 (Australia) ===
A significant tornado touched down in the New South Wales Central West region of Australia, causing severe damage to several properties near the town of Bathurst. The tornado impacted 11 homes, a few of which were significantly damaged or destroyed. Barns and outbuildings were completely destroyed as well, vehicles were damaged, and many large trees were snapped or uprooted. A storage trailer that was thrown from one property was reportedly never found, and a chain link fence was found wrapped around the top of a utility pole. Three people were injured, two of whom were hospitalized. Later that evening, a tornado touched down in a remote area near Narrabri at around sunset, causing no known damage.

== October ==
=== October 9–13 (United States and Canada) ===
| EFU | EF0 | EF1 | EF2 | EF3 | EF4 | EF5 |
|---|---|---|---|---|---|---|
| 11 | 29 | 26 | 4 | 0 | 0 | 0 |

A long-lasting outbreak of mainly weak tornadoes affected the Great Plains and Midwest beginning on October 9, when a few weak tornadoes touched down in North Dakota and Minnesota. During the early morning hours of October 10, an EF2 tornado snapped and uprooted numerous trees as it moved through heavily forested areas of Cook County, Minnesota, before crossing the border into Canada, causing additional tree damage at EF1 intensity near Mountain Lake. Also in Canada, an EF2 tornado caused significant tree damage near Dryden, Ontario. Later that day, a shortwave trough moved over the Great Plains, prompting the Storm Prediction Center to issue a moderate risk for portions of Oklahoma and northeastern Texas. 13 tornadoes touched down in Oklahoma that evening, most of which were weak. However, one EF2 tornado caused considerable damage in Anadarko, where several structures were damaged, and a few were destroyed. Another tornado caused EF1 damage to homes, businesses, and a school building in Coweta. The towns of Warwick and Johnson sustained minor damage from EF0 tornadoes. In addition to the tornadoes, a destructive hailstorm moved through the Oklahoma City metropolitan area just 5.5 months after another hailstorm damaged the southern part of the same area. More tornadoes developed on October 11, most of them in Illinois, including an EF2 tornado that destroyed a couple of large outbuilding structures in Wrights. Another round of tornadoes struck Oklahoma and Kansas on October 12, continuing into the early morning hours of October 13. Some of these tornadoes were large and may have been strong, but remained in remote areas. An EF1 tornado tracked from Mustang to the southeast side of Oklahoma City, damaging homes, trees, and vehicles. Another EF1 tornado caused tree damage near downtown Oklahoma City. Two more EF1 tornadoes touched down in Traverse County, Minnesota, later that day, causing damage to trees and farm outbuildings. Overall, 68 tornadoes were confirmed as a result of this outbreak.

=== October 15–16 (United States and Canada) ===
| EFU | EF0 | EF1 | EF2 | EF3 | EF4 | EF5 |
|---|---|---|---|---|---|---|
| 0 | 12 | 7 | 1 | 0 | 0 | 0 |

In mid-October, a small outbreak produced several tornadoes in Arkansas, Indiana, Ohio, Pennsylvania, and Quebec, most of them weak. The outbreak first produced a few weak tornadoes on October 15, including an EF0 tornado that caused minor damage in Lexington, Indiana. More tornadoes touched down on October 16, a majority of which were spawned by a very long-tracked cyclical supercell that formed in southwestern Indiana, and dissipated in western Pennsylvania. A brief but damaging EF2 tornado caused heavy damage in New Salem, Ohio. A well-built outbuilding structure was destroyed, many trees and power lines were downed, a house sustained roof and exterior wall loss, other structures had roof damage, and debris was scattered throughout the small town. A secondary EF0 tornado also touched down outside of town, damaging outbuildings, blowing the roof off of a manufactured home, and injuring one person. An EF0 tornado also downed trees and damaged a pavilion in the town of Shippingport, Pennsylvania. Farther to the north in Quebec, three EF0 tornadoes near Sainte-Séraphine, Melbourne, and Cowansville caused minor tree and structural damage. The weather system also brought forth a cold front, ending a warm spell in the Northeast, as temperatures dropped by around 20 °F (11 °C). This allowed New York City to get below 50 °F (10 °C) for the first time since late May on October 18, the second latest on record. Altogether, 20 tornadoes were confirmed.

=== October 24–25 (United States) ===
| EFU | EF0 | EF1 | EF2 | EF3 | EF4 | EF5 |
|---|---|---|---|---|---|---|
| 0 | 6 | 8 | 2 | 2 | 0 | 0 |

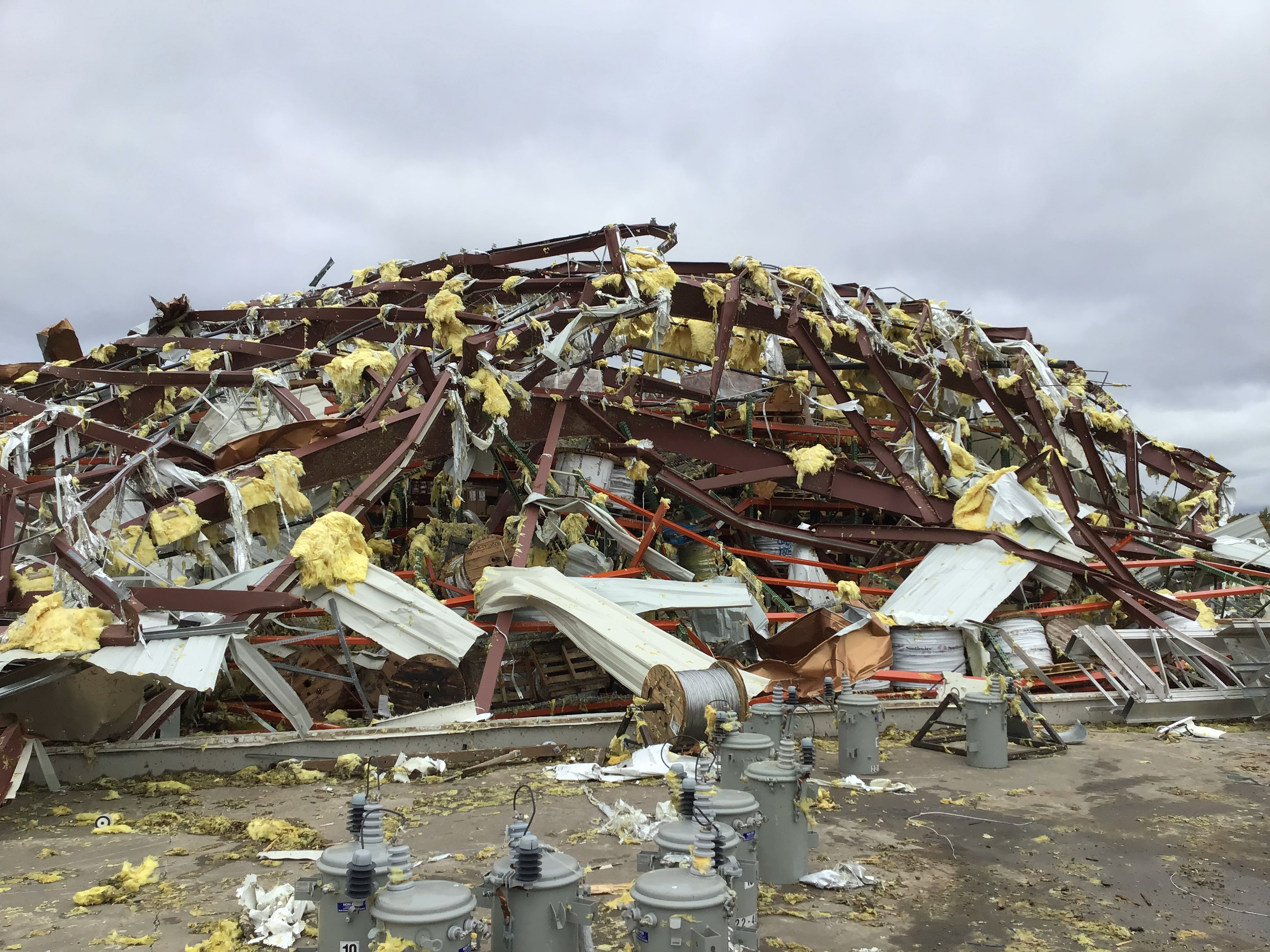
EF3 damage to a large metal-framed warehouse building at the Black River Electric Co-op in Fredericktown, Missouri.

Ahead of an advancing cold front, several supercells developed within an enhanced risk area for severe thunderstorms across central and southeast Missouri and southern Illinois, producing several tornadoes during the afternoon and evening hours. Just before 5:00 pm CDT, an EF2 tornado passed near the town of Purdin, Missouri, ripping the roof off of a house, destroying an office trailer at a propane company, destroying outbuildings, and snapping or uprooting numerous large trees. Later that night, a long-tracked EF3 tornado touched down and severely damaged or destroyed several homes near Farmington, before striking the town of St. Mary, where several more homes sustained significant damage, a large antique mall had its roof ripped off, and vehicles were flipped. A tornado emergency was issued for the town of Chester, Illinois, before the tornado crossed the Mississippi River into Illinois and struck the town, where many trees were downed and homes, businesses, and a nursing home were damaged. The tornado also caused minor to moderate damage in the small community of Bremen before dissipating. Farther to the south, another strong and destructive EF3 tornado moved through the northwestern fringes of Fredericktown, destroying multiple homes and businesses in the area. The tornado caused additional damage to trees, homes, and businesses in Junction City as well. Several other weak tornadoes occurred across the region that evening as well, including two EF0 tornadoes that touched down in the Sedalia, Missouri, area, one of which caused minor damage to trees and houses along the eastern outskirts of town. An EF1 tornado damaged a school building in Zalma, and another EF1 tornado blew the roof off of a house, damaged a barn, and downed trees near Camden as well. A lower-end severe weather threat occurred farther east the next day, with an EF1 tornado touching down and causing tree damage near Turbeville, Virginia. A total of 18 tornadoes were confirmed, resulting in at least two injuries. Damage was at least $160 million.

=== October 26–27 (United States) ===
| EFU | EF0 | EF1 | EF2 | EF3 | EF4 | EF5 |
|---|---|---|---|---|---|---|
| 3 | 5 | 6 | 3 | 0 | 0 | 0 |

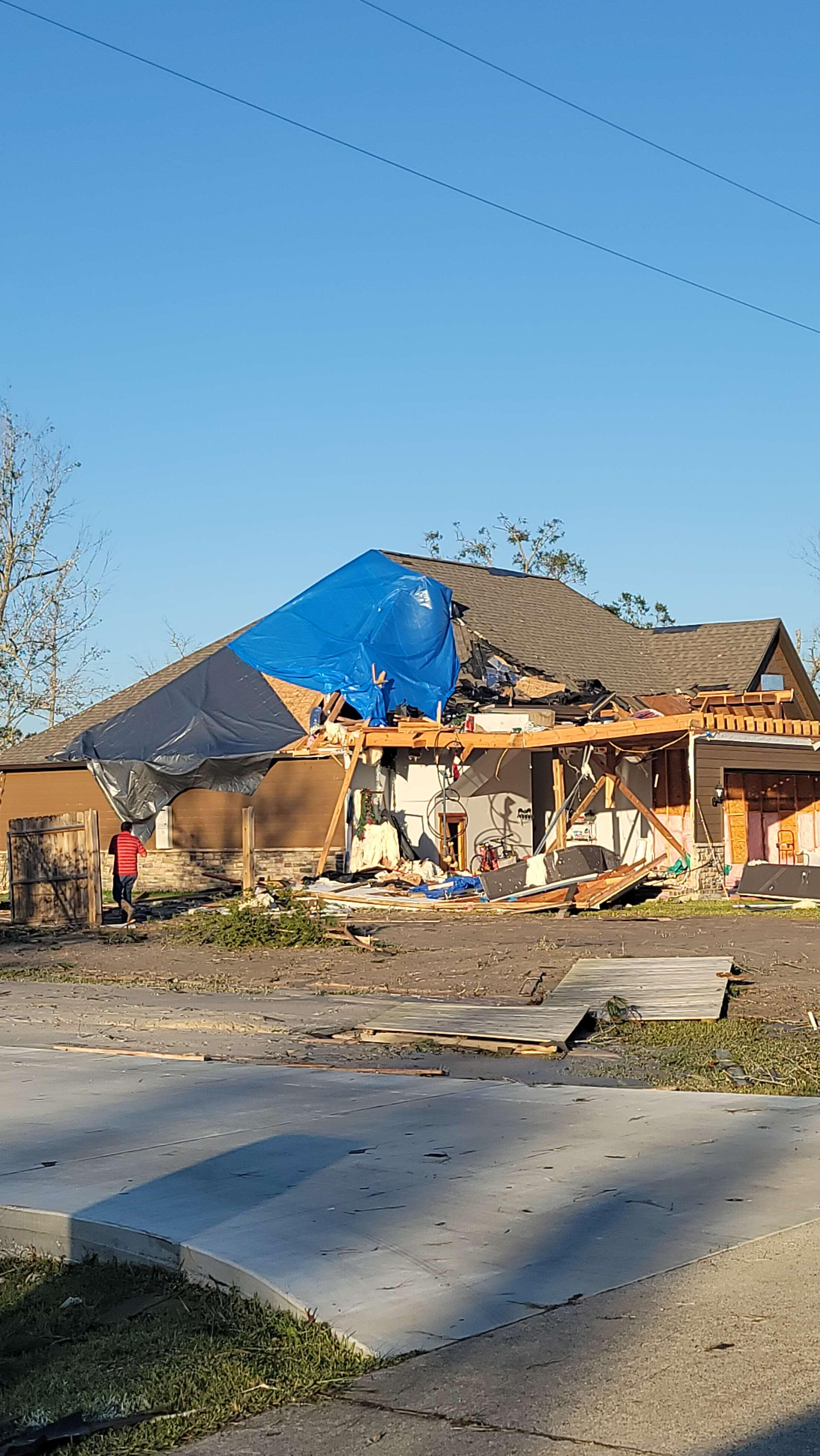
A home partially destroyed by an EF2 tornado near Mauriceville, Texas.

Late on October 26 and just after midnight on October 27, scattered severe thunderstorms and couple of isolated weak tornadoes occurred in the Great Plains region. An EF1 tornado caused minor damage in the Norman, Oklahoma, area, and an EF0 tornado caused damage to tree tops and roof panels in Turon, Kansas. To the south of this area, a strong cold front produced a strong to severe line of thunderstorms that moved into Eastern Texas. Later that morning, a supercell ahead of the squall line produced an EF2 tornado northwest of Pinehurst, which crossed Interstate 10, heavily damaging a home and several garages at a Texas Department of Transportation maintenance facility. An RV camper was tossed, and an ATV was lofted and thrown across Interstate 10 by the tornado. The same storm produced a second EF2 tornado southeast of Mauriceville and continued northeast to near Deweyville, critically injuring one person when it flipped a mobile home near the beginning of the path. Other mobile homes were damaged or destroyed, and several site built homes had their roofs torn off. An EF0 tornado also moved through the Port Acres neighborhood in Port Arthur, causing minor damage. Later, a brief but strong EF2 tornado embedded within the squall line also caused major structural damage to homes southern Lake Charles, Louisiana, while an EF1 tornado caused additional damage to warehouse buildings on the east side of the city. In Mandeville, a brief EF0 tornado caused minor tree and roof damage. During the evening of October 27, a high-end EF1 tornado caused considerable damage in Picayune, Mississippi, where some mobile homes were damaged or destroyed, extensive tree damage occurred, and homes had roofing and carports torn off. In Moss Point, another EF1 tornado killed one person when it struck a car traveling along MS 63, causing the driver to lose control and be ejected from the vehicle. Trees, structures, and other vehicles were also damaged in Moss Point. Overall, this small outbreak produced 17 tornadoes, resulting in one fatality and at least three injuries, one critical. Damage amounted to ten million dollars.

== November ==
=== November 13 (United States) ===
| EFU | EF0 | EF1 | EF2 | EF3 | EF4 | EF5 |
|---|---|---|---|---|---|---|
| 0 | 9 | 2 | 0 | 0 | 0 | 0 |

During the afternoon of November 13, an intense line of thunderstorms and cold front moved through the New York City metropolitan area and into Connecticut, Rhode Island, and Massachusetts, producing widespread wind damage, damaging hail, and several tornadoes on Long Island and across Connecticut and Rhode Island, which marked the first Long Island tornado in November in history. Considerable damage occurred with a high-end EF1 tornado in Suffolk County, New York, where numerous homes and businesses were damaged in Shirley and several airplanes were flipped or moved at Brookhaven Airport A total of eleven tornadoes were confirmed, five of which struck Suffolk County. Damage from the line of storms amounted to nearly $2.9 million in damage, with $900,000 being in the EF1 tornado that struck Suffolk County.

=== November 16–18 (Italy) ===
| FU | F0 | F1 | F2 | F3 | F4 | F5 |
|---|---|---|---|---|---|---|
| 2 | 5 | 2 | 2 | 0 | 0 | 0 |

Beginning on November 16, a tornado outbreak affected Sicily, with many of the tornadoes first forming over the Mediterranean Sea as tornadic waterspouts before moving ashore. The first tornado of the outbreak was an F1 tornado that came ashore near Selinunte and passed near Castelvetrano, causing tree damage. An F1 multiple-vortex tornado passed near Bisacquino and impacted several farms, damaging the roofs of homes, snapping and uprooting trees, moving and damaging a car, severely damaging a large metal agricultural building, and destroying small sheds. Three weak tornadoes struck Sciacca, two of which caused F0 tree damage, while the other caused no noticeable damage. Two F0 tornadoes also struck Siculiana and Naro, causing minor damage to buildings and downing trees and light poles. Around sunset, three large tornadic waterspouts occurred simultaneously in the Licata area, and were caught on video from multiple angles. Two of them dissipated before reaching land, though one impacted a marina, damaging boats and causing F0 damage to several nearby buildings. On November 17, an F2 cone tornado touched down in Comiso, where a gas station, a car wash, and multiple industrial buildings suffered extensive damage. Homes had sections of their roofs torn off, vehicles were damaged by flying debris, and a semi-trailer was overturned. Concrete power poles and trees were snapped, and masonry fencing was blown over as well. Not long after, a multiple-vortex F2 wedge tornado caused significant damage in Modica, killing one person and injuring two others. Homes, businesses, warehouses, and other structures were heavily damaged, some of which had their roofs torn off. Trees and power poles were snapped, brick fences were destroyed, and cars were thrown as well. The fatality occurred when a car was tossed into a gate, killing the driver. Lastly, on the 18th, an isolated rope tornado developed near Caltabellotta, causing no known damage. Overall, a total of 11 tornadoes were confirmed as a result of this outbreak, which caused one fatality and two injuries.

== December ==
=== December 10–11 (United States) ===
| EFU | EF0 | EF1 | EF2 | EF3 | EF4 | EF5 |
|---|---|---|---|---|---|---|
| 1 | 17 | 29 | 16 | 6 | 2 | 0 |

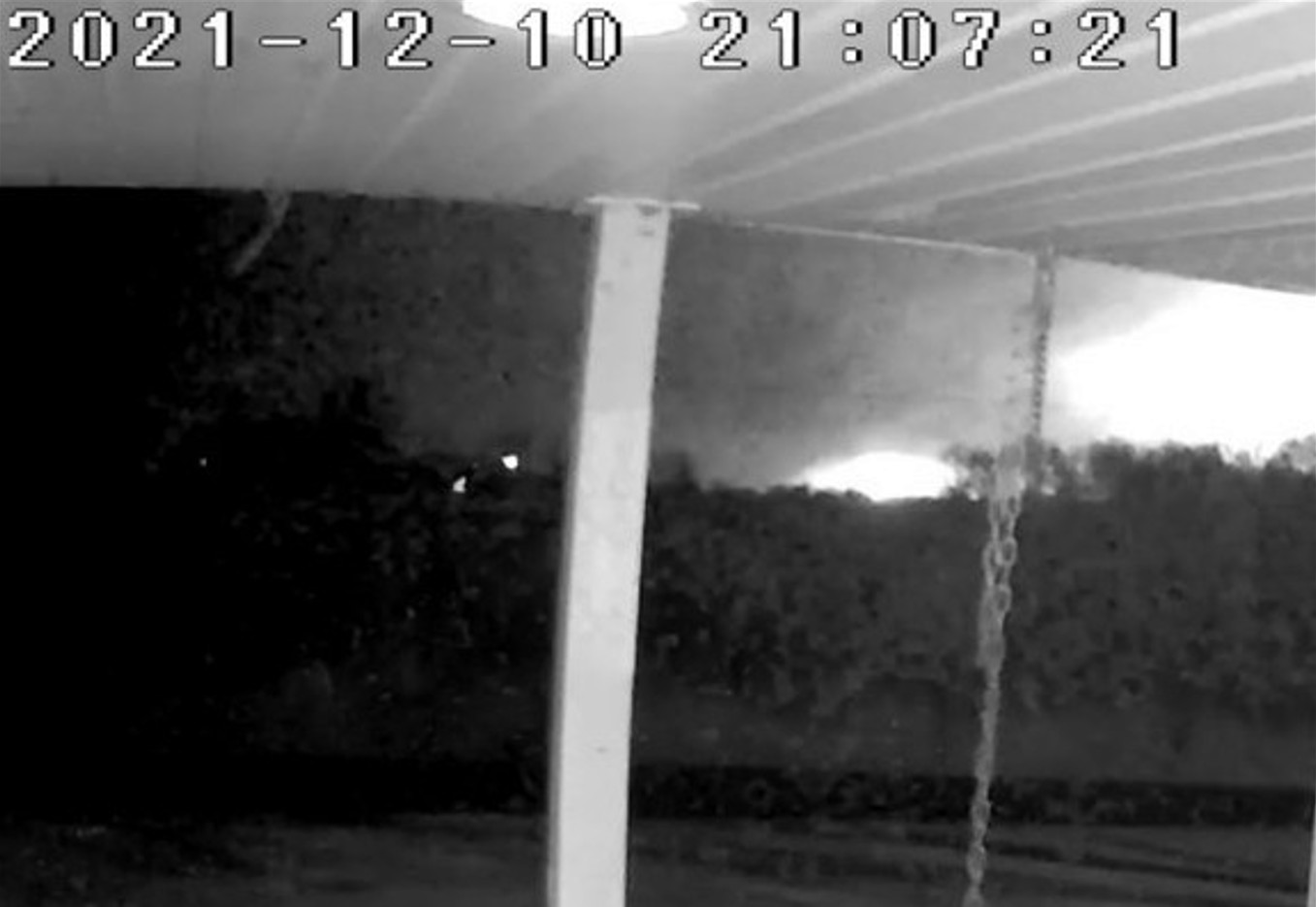
An EF4 tornado near Cayce, Kentucky.

The deadliest December tornado outbreak in United States history caused catastrophic damage and numerous fatalities, as multiple strong to violent long-tracked tornadoes devastated portions of the Southern United States and Ohio Valley from the evening of December 10, into the early morning hours of December 11. The event came to fruition as a trough progressed eastward across the United States, interacting with an unseasonably moist, unstable, and highly sheared environment across the Mississippi Valley. The SPC had issued a moderate risk of severe weather prior to the outbreak, including a 15% hatched risk area for tornadoes. Multiple supercell thunderstorms developed, and tornadic activity began later that evening in northeastern Arkansas, before progressing into Missouri, Illinois, Tennessee, and Kentucky. A high-end EF3 tornado damaged or destroyed multiple homes near Defiance, Missouri, killing one person and injuring two others. An EF3 tornado also destroyed an Amazon warehouse in Edwardsville, Illinois, killing six employees. Several other strong EF2 tornadoes touched down in more rural areas of Illinois with one of them tearing the roof off of a house, flipping tanker trucks, and destroying buildings at an agricultural services plant near Gays. Farther south, another EF2 tornado destroyed homes, mobile homes, and a vacant grocery story building in Trumann, Arkansas, and damaged the town's fire department building.

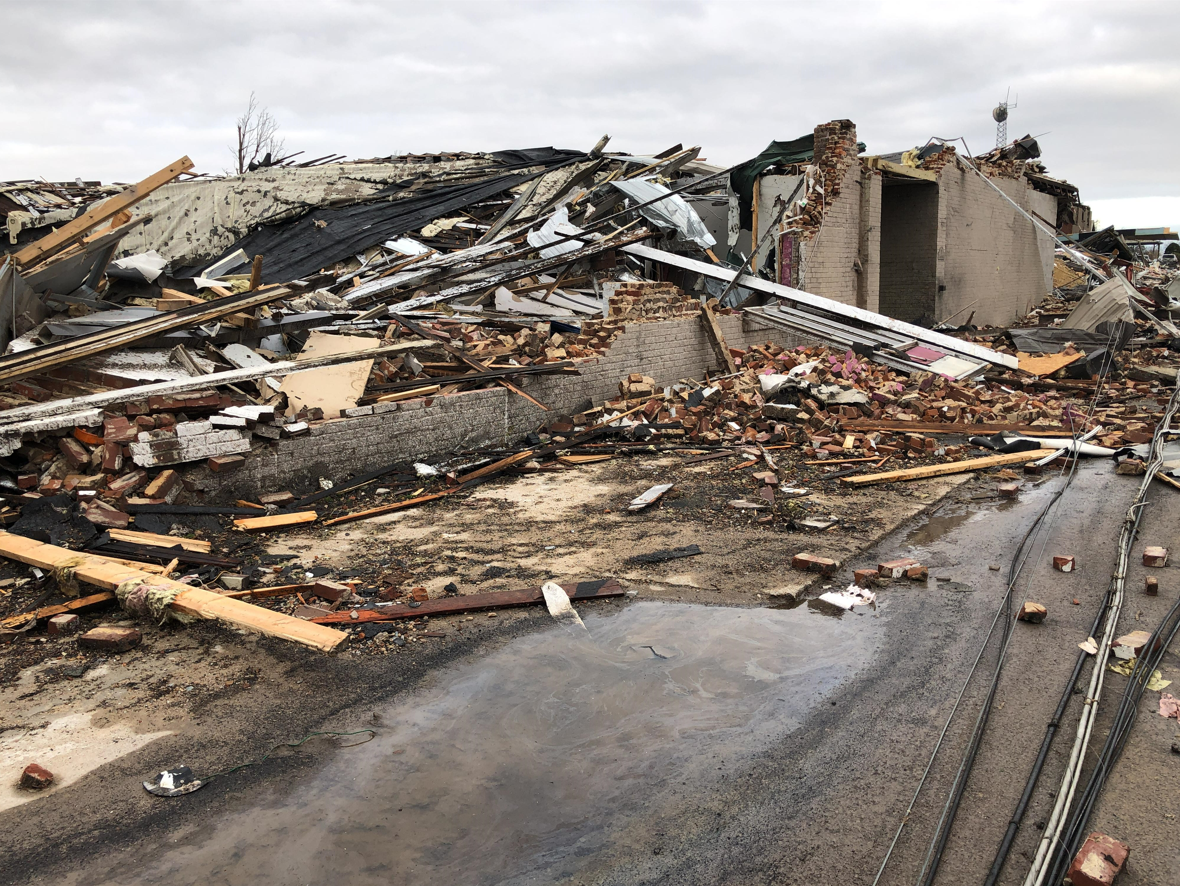
EF4 damage to well-built brick buildings in downtown Mayfield, Kentucky.

The most significant tornadoes of the outbreak were spawned by a long-tracked supercell thunderstorm that produced a violent tornado family across four states. Initially, media reports suggested that the tornado family, which was inaccurately identified by some media outlets as the "Quad-State tornado" due to the storm's similar characteristics to the Tri-State tornado of 1925, may have actually been a single, extremely long-tracked tornado that cut a path of destruction of up to 250 miles (400 km) from near Bay, Arkansas, to Rough River Lake in Kentucky. However, a path break in Obion County, Tennessee, confirmed two separate EF4 tornadoes, one tracking 81.2 miles (130.7 km) and the other tracking 165.7 miles (266.7 km). The first of these tornadoes first caused major damage in the Arkansas towns of Monette and Leachville, as many homes and businesses were destroyed in both towns. The tornado crossed into the Missouri Bootheel, where homes were swept completely away near Braggadocio, and semi-trucks were thrown from roadways near Hayti before it crossed the Mississippi River into Tennessee. There, many other structures were completely destroyed at a resort along the shores of Reelfoot Lake, and in Samburg. A total of eight people were killed by this first tornado, and 16 others were injured. The second violent tornado, which was rated high-end EF4, caused catastrophic damage and 57 fatalities as it tore through the towns of Cayce, Mayfield, Princeton, Dawson Springs, and Bremen. Thousands of homes and businesses were destroyed along the path, many of which were leveled or swept from their foundations. Trees were debarked, vehicles were thrown and mangled, severe ground scouring occurred, and 24 people were killed in Mayfield and surrounding Graves County alone. Mayfield sustained near-total destruction of its historic downtown square, and nine of the fatalities occurred at a candle factory that was flattened in the southwest part of town.

The city of Bowling Green, Kentucky, sustained major damage as it was struck by a high-end EF3 tornado during the very early morning hours of December 11, which destroyed numerous homes, and inflicted severe structural damage to townhouses and apartment buildings as it moved through multiple neighborhoods. Many businesses also sustained severe damage or were destroyed, including the GM Corvette Assembly Plant, which had much of its roofing torn off. The main Bowling Green tornado was accompanied by an EF2 satellite tornado that caused additional significant damage in the city. The supercell that produced the two Bowling Green tornadoes also produced an EF3 tornado that destroyed a dairy farm, homes and mobile homes, chicken houses, and a metal truss tower near Russellville. Another long-tracked, high-end EF3 tornado caused severe damage to homes in Kenton, Tennessee, before destroying many homes and businesses in Dresden, where major structural damage occurred in the downtown area. It continued past Dresden and eventually crossed into Kentucky, where additional significant damage occurred in the town of Pembroke before the tornado dissipated, resulting in 34 injuries but no fatalities along its path. Yet another EF3 tornado destroyed houses, tossed vehicles, killed one person, and injured 31 others near Saloma, Kentucky, while an EF2 tornado heavily damaged hotels, restaurants, and a trailer park in Cave City. Overall, this outbreak produced a total of 71 tornadoes, resulting in 89 fatalities and over 650 injuries.

=== December 15–16 (United States) ===
| EFU | EF0 | EF1 | EF2 | EF3 | EF4 | EF5 |
|---|---|---|---|---|---|---|
| 5 | 27 | 55 | 33 | 0 | 0 | 0 |

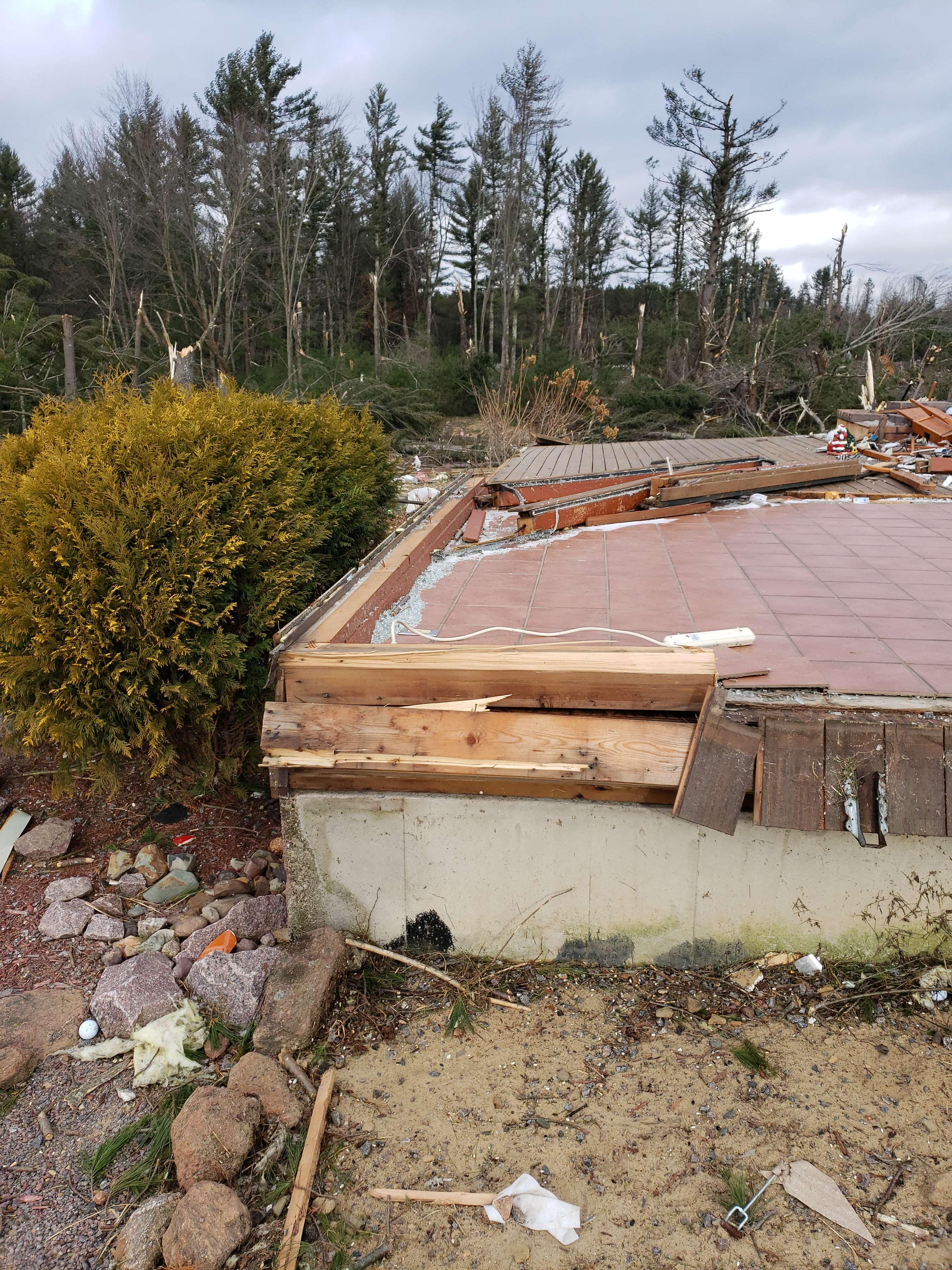
High-end EF2 damage to a small and poorly-anchored home near Neillsville, Wisconsin.

A large and powerful low-pressure system that had previously produced heavy rain and snow to the Western United States the previous two days rapidly deepened and contributed to a historic expanse of inclement weather on December 15. On the west side of the system, a destructive wind storm impacted Colorado and Kansas. In Colorado, a 107 mph (172 km/h) wind gust was recorded in Lamar with widespread power outages and damage to homes recorded elsewhere. In Kansas, the intense winds led to substantial amounts of dust being stirred up. The massive dust storms closed several highways and led to numerous crashes along Interstate 70, including two crashes that resulted in three fatalities. The wind storms also contributed to an outbreak of wildfires in the drought-stricken north-central part of the state with 163,755 acres (66,269 ha) of land being burned across the region. The wildfires burned numerous buildings and killed hundreds of livestock. Two men were killed as a result of being burned and three other people were hospitalized due to their injuries. (These casualties were labeled as indirect.)

On the warm side of the system, an intense derecho struck areas of the Midwest, including Kansas, Nebraska, Iowa, Wisconsin, and Minnesota. In Russell, Kansas, wind gusts measured at 100 mph (160 km/h) blew roofs off homes and uprooted trees while Lincoln Airport in Lincoln, Nebraska, measured peak winds of 93 mph (150 km/h). At least 57 hurricane-force wind reports were received by the National Weather Service, signaling the most prolific wind event in the United States dating back to at least 2004. A semi-truck on US 151 near Walford, Iowa, was blown over, ejecting and fatally injuring the driver who was not wearing a seatbelt. The derecho was also a prolific tornado producer with dozens of tornado touchdowns being confirmed in Nebraska, Iowa, Minnesota, and Wisconsin, including several strong tornadoes in the Omaha metropolitan area and across Guthrie, Greene, and Webster counties in Iowa. Although none of the tornadoes exceeded EF2 intensity, 33 of the tornadoes were given this rating, which was 10 more than the amount of EF2+ tornadoes that occurred in the outbreak a few days prior. One EF2 tornado struck Columbus, Nebraska, causing minor to heavy damage to homes, snapping power lines, and damaging trees. It was the only tornado of the event to cause casualties as two people were injured. The tornado outbreak set a new record for the most tornadoes to hit Iowa in a single day with 61, far exceeding the previous record of 35 tornadoes set on August 31, 2014. Additionally, 21 of the tornadoes in Iowa were rated EF2 which beat the previous record of 16 EF2/F2 or greater tornadoes set on June 7, 1984. Prior to this event, there had only been five December tornadoes in Iowa, all in southeast Iowa. This outbreak also marked the first time that tornadoes were recorded in Minnesota in the month of December. Additionally, it was the first time since record keeping began in 1986 that the National Weather Service Forecast Office in Sioux Falls, South Dakota, had to issue both severe thunderstorm and tornado warnings during the month of December, with 6 and 8 issued, respectively. All of the severe storms took place in their coverage area in northwest Iowa. Total damage from the tornado outbreak amounted to at least $16.6 million in damage. Although the tornadoes were not as intense as the ones produced by the outbreak a few days prior, this event produced the most total confirmed tornadoes ever recorded in a December outbreak, with 120 in total. Ultimately, this became one of the largest single-day tornado outbreaks–in terms of number of confirmed tornadoes–in recorded history. Temperatures behind the derecho also dropped tremendously across the region, leading to light snow that was accompanied by strong winds. This triggered the first issuance of snow squall warnings by the National Weather Service Forecast Office in Hastings, Nebraska. As a whole, the event caused seven total deaths and at least $1.8 billion in damage.

=== December 29–31 (United States) ===
| EFU | EF0 | EF1 | EF2 | EF3 | EF4 | EF5 |
|---|---|---|---|---|---|---|
| 0 | 4 | 9 | 0 | 0 | 0 | 0 |

An unsettled pattern across the Southern United States led to several weak tornadoes being produced over Alabama and Georgia over three days. Bainbridge, Georgia, was struck directly by a weak tornado, rated EF0, during the afternoon of December 29, while Winfield, Alabama, was struck a few hours later by a long-tracked EF1 tornado. The commercial district in Winfield was impacted, with numerous businesses sustaining damage. Additional EF1 tornadoes struck near Rainsville and in Chilton County. On the afternoon of December 30, three tornadoes, all rated EF1, struck southern Georgia, impacting Colquitt, Cook, and Jeff Davis counties, with numerous homes being damaged. On December 31, additional EF1 tornadoes impacted Carroll and Newton counties in Georgia, producing damage to numerous homes, businesses, and a school. Six minor injuries occurred during the event, all from an EF1 tornado that struck near a Chick-fil-A near Covington, Georgia, on December 31.

== See also ==
- Weather of 2021
- Tornado
  - Tornadoes by year
  - Tornado records
  - Tornado climatology
  - Tornado myths
- List of tornado outbreaks
  - List of F5 and EF5 tornadoes
  - List of F4 and EF4 tornadoes
    - List of F4 and EF4 tornadoes (2020–present)
  - List of F3, EF3, and IF3 tornadoes (2020–present)
  - List of North American tornadoes and tornado outbreaks
  - List of 21st-century Canadian tornadoes and tornado outbreaks
  - List of European tornadoes and tornado outbreaks
  - List of tornadoes and tornado outbreaks in Asia
  - List of Southern Hemisphere tornadoes and tornado outbreaks
  - List of tornadoes striking downtown areas
  - List of tornadoes with confirmed satellite tornadoes
- Tornado intensity
  - Fujita scale
  - Enhanced Fujita scale
  - International Fujita scale
  - TORRO scale
