= Tornado outbreak of December 10–11, 2021 =

Late-season tornado outbreak in the U.S. Mississippi Valley

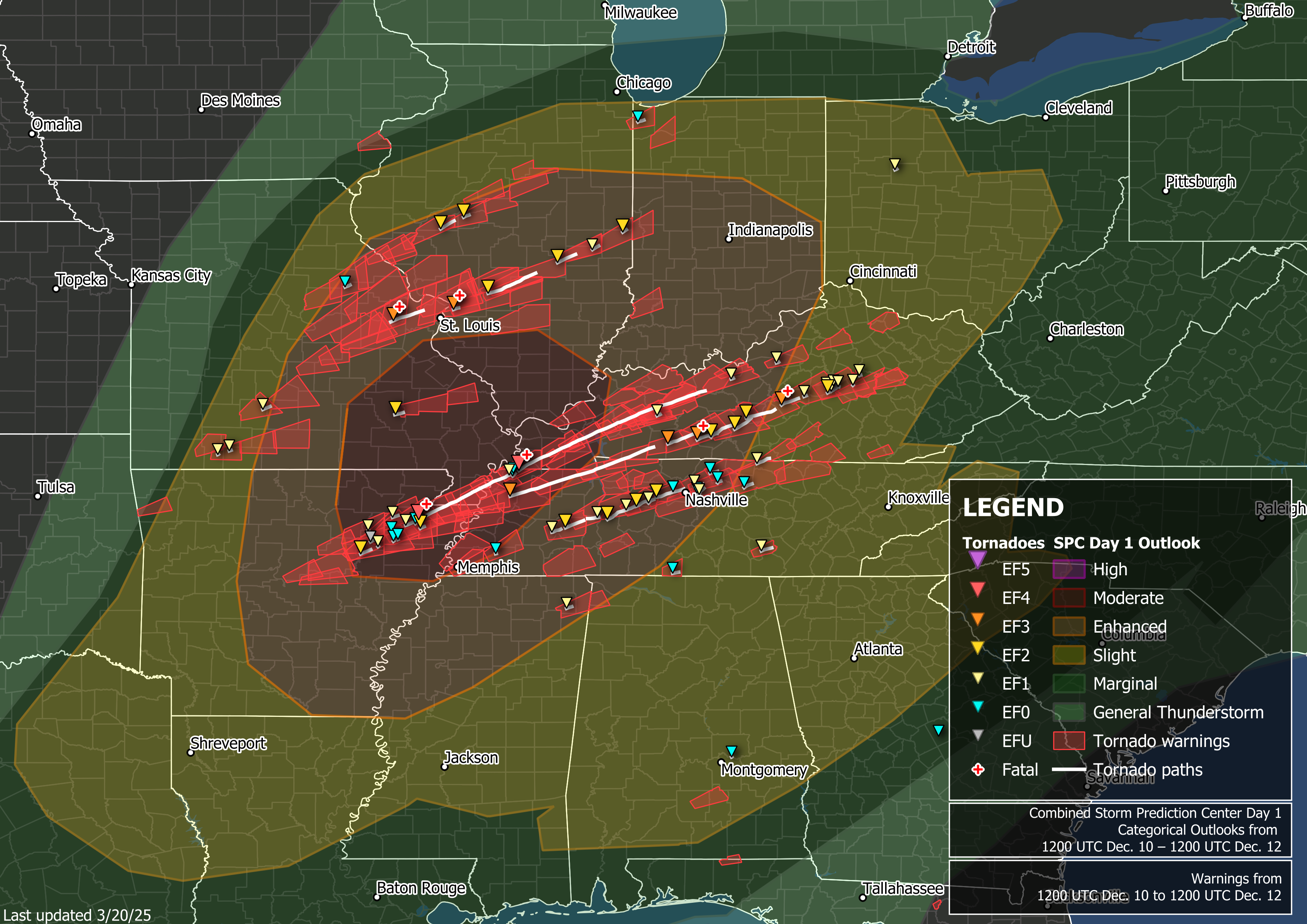
- Map of tornado warnings and confirmed tornadoes from the outbreak

Meteorological history
- Duration: December 10–11, 2021

Tornado outbreak
- Tornadoes: 71
- Max. rating: EF4 tornado
- Duration: 24 hours, 11 minutes
- Highest winds: Tornadic – 190 mph (310 km/h) (Western Kentucky EF4 tornado)
- Highest gusts: Non-tornadic – 85 mph (137 km/h) (Tremont, Illinois, straight-line winds on December 10)
- Largest hail: 2.00 in (5.1 cm) in Bogata, Texas, on December 10

Extratropical cyclone
- Lowest pressure: 974 hPa (mbar); 28.76 inHg
- Max. snowfall: 37.5 in (95 cm) near Encampment, Wyoming

Overall effects
- Fatalities: 89 confirmed (Note: This figure only includes direct tornadic deaths.) (+6 non-tornadic)
- Injuries: 676
- Damage: $3.9 billion (2021 USD)
- Areas affected: Central, Southern, and Midwestern United States
- Power outages: 740,000
- Part of the tornado outbreaks of 2021 and 2021–22 North American winter

A deadly late-season tornado outbreak, the deadliest on record in December, produced catastrophic damage and numerous fatalities across portions of the Southern United States and Ohio Valley from the evening of December 10 to the early morning of the 11th, 2021. The event developed as a trough progressed eastward across the United States, interacting with an unseasonably moist and unstable environment across the Mississippi Valley. Tornado activity began in northeastern Arkansas, before progressing into Missouri, Illinois, Tennessee, and Kentucky.

External image
- Animation of Tornado outbreak from December 11, 1:20 to 7:00 UTC

The most extreme impacts resulted from two long-track supercell thunderstorms that produced families of strong tornadoes. The first of these supercells produced tornadoes spanning four Mid-South states. The first notable tornado of the event began in northeastern Arkansas, near Jonesboro, causing major damage in and near towns such as Monette and Leachville, Arkansas, at EF4 intensity. It crossed the Missouri Bootheel, causing additional damage and fatalities near Braggadocio and Hayti. After crossing the Mississippi River into northwestern West Tennessee, that tornado dissipated, and a high-end EF4 tornado formed and moved through Western Kentucky, where the towns of Cayce, Mayfield, Princeton, Dawson Springs, and Bremen suffered severe to catastrophic damage.

Early estimates suggested that the tornado family—identified by some media outlets as a "quad-state tornado", due to the storm's long track, apparent continuity, and similarity to the 219-mile (352 km) tri-state tornado of 1925—might have cut a path of up to 250 miles (400 km) across the affected areas, making it the longest-tracked tornado in history. However, storm surveys found that the majority of the storm's path consisted of two distinct EF4 tornadoes, with three short-lived and weak tornadoes in between them in northwestern Obion County, Tennessee. The parent supercell that produced the two EF4 tornadoes, and eleven tornadoes in total, later became known as the "quad-state supercell". The second supercell and tornado family, produced an EF3 tornado tracking nearly 123 miles (198 km) in Tennessee and southern Kentucky, causing major damage in Dresden, Tennessee. It also produced a catastrophic EF3 tornado that moved through Bowling Green, Kentucky as well as other tornadoes in southern and central Kentucky. Other tornadic thunderstorms affected portions of eastern Missouri, Southern Illinois, West and Middle Tennessee, and western to central Kentucky during the late evening into the overnight hours of December 11, including two more EF3 tornadoes that struck Edwardsville, Illinois and Defiance, Missouri.

The death toll from the outbreak was 89 (with six additional non-tornadic fatalities), surpassing the tornado outbreak sequence of December 1–6, 1953, which caused 49 fatalities, as the deadliest December tornado event ever recorded in the United States. In Kentucky alone, 74 people were killed by three separate tornadoes. In addition, at least 672 people were injured. The tornado outbreak caused at least $3.9 billion (2022 USD) in damages. The outbreak set a new record for confirmed tornadoes in the month of December, with 71, a record that only stood until December 15, when a larger outbreak produced 120 tornadoes across the Midwest.

== Meteorological synopsis ==
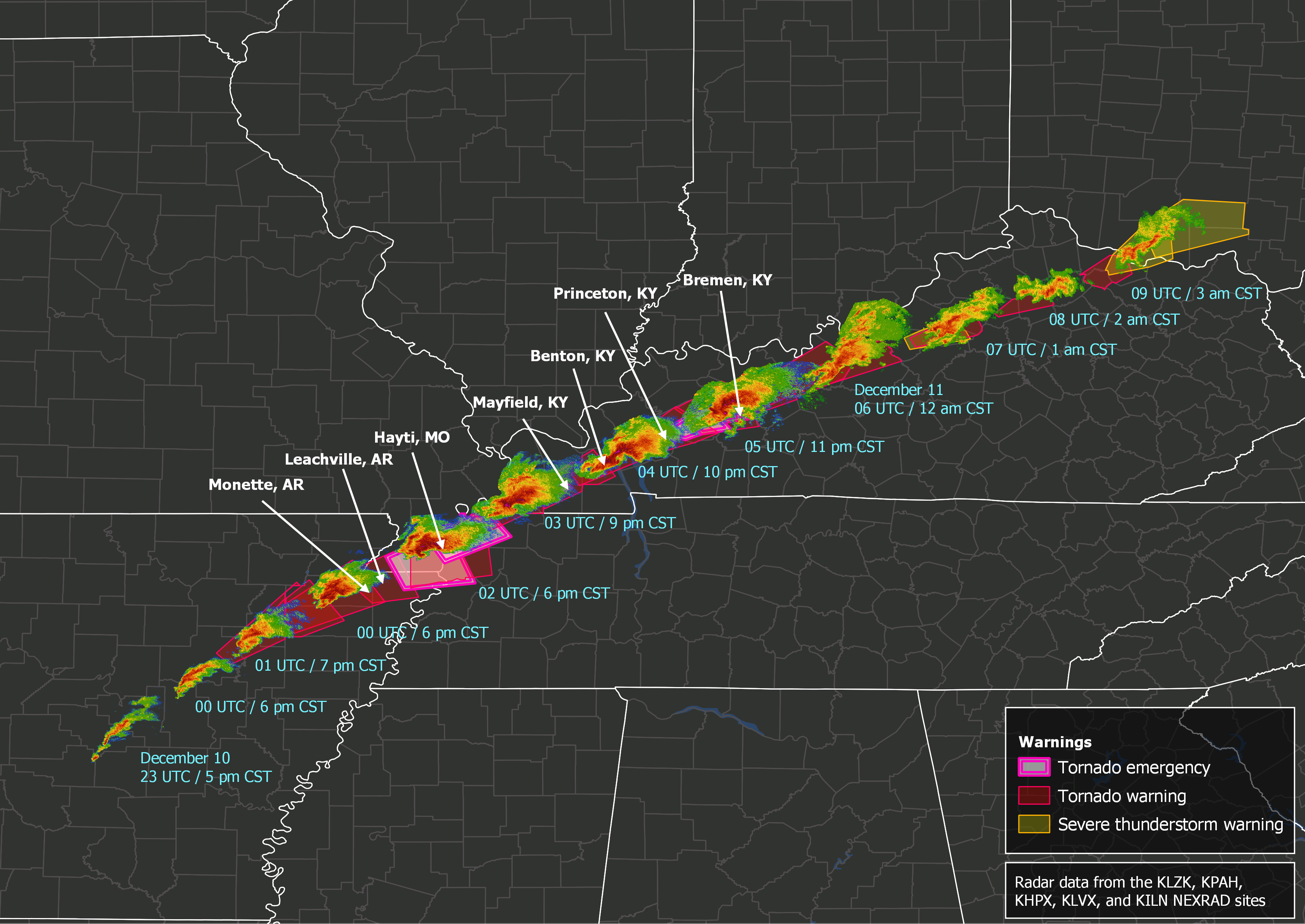
Radar collage of a supercell that spawned a tornado family during the outbreak

On December 8, the Storm Prediction Center (SPC) outlined a slight risk of severe weather across a broad area of the Mississippi Valley. Despite the potential for a higher-end severe threat to materialize, forecasters expressed uncertainty regarding the extent of instability, degree of directional wind shear, and late timing of potential storms. The following day, the SPC noted the increased potential for organized severe thunderstorms in the region extending from southeastern Arkansas northeast into southern Indiana, upgrading that area to an enhanced risk.

As an intense upper-level trough progressed across the High Plains, with robust instability and moisture return across the Mississippi Valley, the SPC expanded the enhanced risk and introduced a moderate risk area from northeastern Arkansas into southern Illinois on the morning of December 10. Forecasters indicated that atmospheric conditions favored the development of nocturnal supercells capable of producing long-tracked, strong tornadoes.

At 3:00 p.m. CST (21:00 UTC), the SPC issued a tornado watch across the highest risk area (encompassing central and eastern Arkansas, west Tennessee, northwestern Mississippi, southeastern Missouri, and southern portions of Illinois and Indiana), the first of eleven issued over subsequent hours over the middle Mississippi Valley. Initial storms developed across central Arkansas around 2:00 p.m. CST (20:00 UTC), with even weaker activity developing over central Missouri a little over 1 1/2 hours later; additional clusters of thunderstorms developed over southwestern Missouri (forming between Bolivar and Carthage, eventually back-building into northeastern Oklahoma) and central Arkansas (forming southwest of Hot Springs) between 5:00 and 5:30 p.m. CST (23:00–23:30 UTC). Though this activity lacked much vigor at its onset due to a strong capping inversion, the convective cells began to show organization as they progressed eastward.

Outbreak summary map
- Tornado tracks during the outbreak Click to enlarge

One such storm—which formed from the initial mid-afternoon activity near Arkadelphia, Arkansas—matured into a long-lived supercell as it progressed in an unstable, deeply moist, and highly sheared environment; this cell ultimately persisted for more than 550 miles (890 km) over several hours from eastern Arkansas to northeastern Kentucky, producing two large and intense tornadoes along its track, among eleven tornadoes in total. The cell started showing signs of surface-based rotation southwest of Searcy, Arkansas, around 5:30 p.m. CST (23:30 UTC). At 5:51 p.m. CST, the National Weather Service office in North Little Rock issued the first tornado warning associated with the storm for portions of Jackson, Lawrence, White, and Woodruff counties. One of the first tornadoes associated with the storm, an EF0, touched down in western Poinsett County (near Weiner) around 6:40 p.m. CST; about fifteen minutes later, storm spotters reported a large tornado near Greenfield, prompting a PDS tornado warning for portions of Poinsett, Craighead and Mississippi counties (including areas to the south of Jonesboro).

Doppler radar analysis estimated that the supercell maintained a nearly continuous high-end rotational vorticity signature, averaging 94 mph (151 km/h; 82 kn) for approximately four hours and 20 minutes, a rarity among thunderstorms that produce mesocyclonic vorticity exceeding such speeds (averaging 1.5% of all supercells). The only velocities below said average recorded along the storm track were observed between 8:44 and 9:01 p.m. CST [02:44–3:01 UTC] as the storm crossed from Obion County, Tennessee into Hickman County, Kentucky. This time frame coincides with the start of the Western Kentucky tornado, implying the supercell underwent a mesocyclone re-strengthening phase during this period. During this intense tornado's lifetime, peak gate-to-gate velocities of 128 mph (206 km/h; 111 kn) were recorded at 9:58 p.m. CST (04:58 UTC) over northeastern Marshall County, Kentucky.

Elsewhere, multiple lines of intense storms, some featuring embedded supercells, developed across the Mississippi Valley region through the overnight hours and generated other strong and long-lived tornadoes. By the pre-dawn hours of December 11, a decrease in instability led to a gradual weakening of a line of thunderstorms stretching along the associated cold front from eastern Kentucky southward into central Alabama.

The SPC issued a record-setting 43 mesoscale discussions (MCD) throughout the course of the day (12 UTC December 10 to 12 UTC December 11), all of which were associated with the broader storm system: 38 of the MCDs issued were convective discussions relating to the severe thunderstorm activity, and five were non-convective discussions relating to heavy snow associated with the system that concurrently fell throughout much of the Upper Midwest. The National Weather Service (NWS) issued a total of 149 tornado warnings throughout the night across nine states: Arkansas, Tennessee, Missouri, Mississippi, Kentucky, Illinois, and Indiana.

These included multiple 'particularly dangerous situation' (PDS) tornado warnings and tornado emergencies in Arkansas, Tennessee, Kentucky, and Missouri. Eight of the tornado warnings issued during the event by the NWS offices in Memphis, Tennessee, and Paducah, Kentucky, were tornado emergencies, the most ever issued during the month of December (breaking the previous record of three issued on December 23, 2015).

Effects from the system responsible for the outbreak extended into Canada, where the Meteorological Service of Canada issued wind and heavy rainfall warnings for portions of Ontario. However, no tornadoes were expected nor reported north of the border.

== Confirmed tornadoes ==
Confirmed tornadoes by Enhanced Fujita rating
EFU	EF0	EF1	EF2	EF3	EF4	EF5	Total
1	17	29	16	6	2	0	71

With a total of 71 tornadoes, this was one of the largest December tornado outbreaks on record in the United States, only to be surpassed by an even larger outbreak just five days later which recorded well over 100 tornadoes in a shorter time period.

=== Northeast Arkansas–Missouri Bootheel–Northwest Tennessee ===
Tri-State (Arkansas, Missouri, Tennessee)
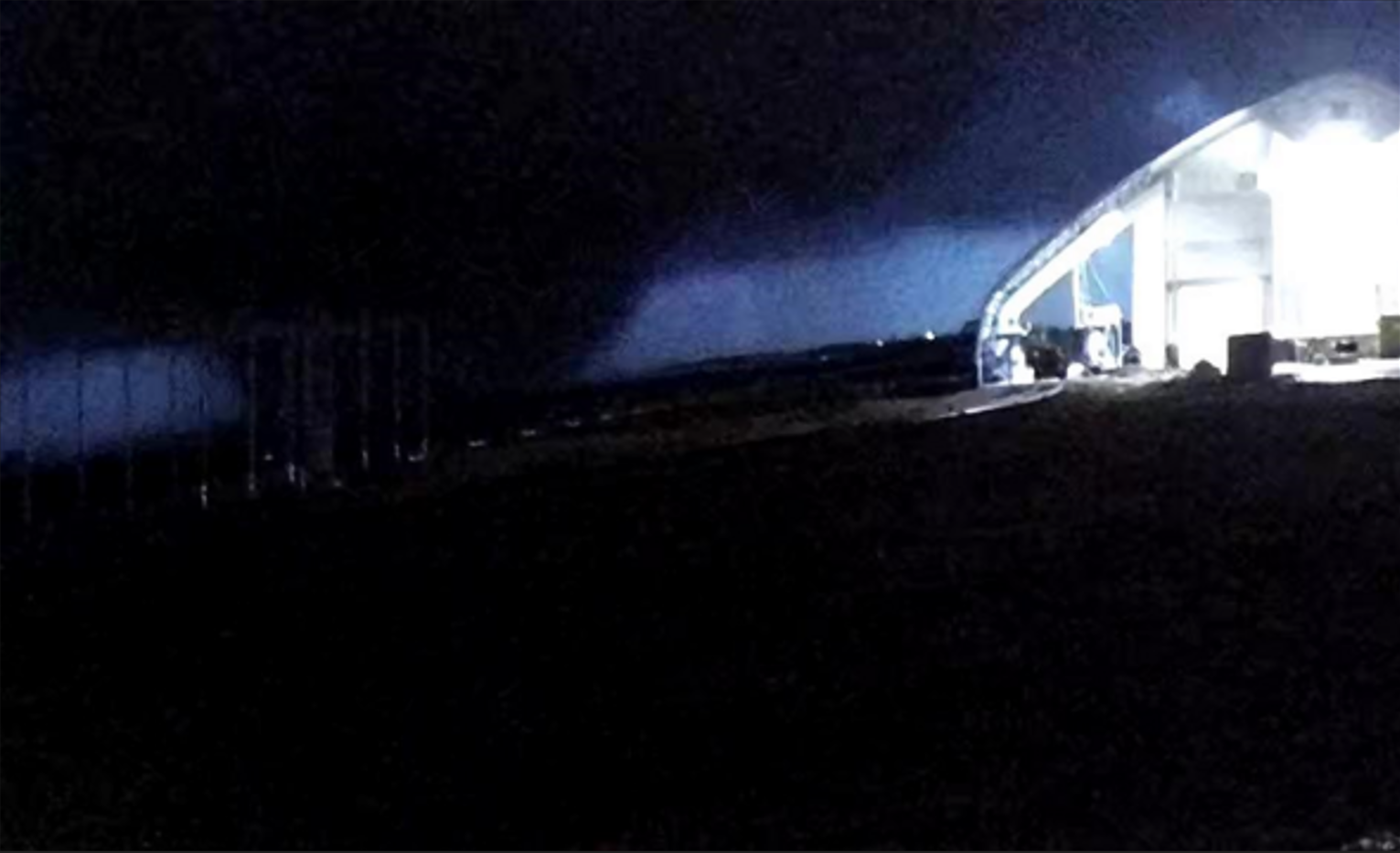
- The tornado being illuminated by lightning during the night near Hayti, Missouri.

Meteorological history
- Formed: December 10, 7:07 p.m. CST (UTC−06:00)
- Dissipated: December 10, 8:36 p.m. CST (UTC−06:00)
- Duration: 1 hour, 29 minutes

EF4 tornado
- on the Enhanced Fujita scale
- Highest winds: 170 mph (270 km/h)

Overall effects
- Fatalities: 8 (+1 indirect)
- Injuries: 16

This violent, long-tracked, and deadly EF4 wedge tornado was the fifth of eleven spawned by the quad-state supercell, and the first of two violent tornadoes produced by the storm. It first touched down in Craighead County, Arkansas, just north of Bay, at 7:07 p.m. CST (01:07 UTC) on the evening of December 10. After initially only causing minor EF0 tree and outbuilding damage, the tornado moved through the south side of Bowman, inflicting EF0 to EF1 damage to roofs as well as downing power poles and tree limbs, and bending a radio antenna at a residence. The tornado then intensified to EF2 strength as it crossed AR 18 and passed northwest of Lake City, downing trees and damaging or destroying some metal outbuildings. A house also sustained minor damage in this area and AR 135 north of town was shut down due to downed power lines. The growing tornado then crossed County Road 505 as it continued northeastward, snapping power poles, unroofing a house, inflicting major roof damage to another home, overturning an irrigation pivot sprinkler, and damaging a silo. The tornado then reached EF3 strength as it moved through the western and northern fringes of Monette. Two industrial buildings were destroyed at the west edge of town, and many trees and power poles were snapped. The Monette Manor nursing home lost most of its roof and had masonry exterior walls knocked down, killing one person and trapping 20 other residents and employees, including five people who were injured. Multiple homes and mobile homes were damaged or destroyed in a neighborhood near the nursing home, several large grain silos were torn apart, and AR 139 was also shut down near the town due to downed power lines.

Maintaining EF3 intensity as it crossed into northwestern Mississippi County, the tornado struck Leachville, killing a person at a local Dollar General store that was completely destroyed, heavily damaging or destroying homes, mobile homes, and a few metal-framed warehouse buildings, and tossing cars and semi-trailers. Extensive tree damage also occurred, and businesses in downtown Leachville had roofing blown off. Still at EF3 intensity, the tornado grew larger as it passed near Buckeye, and very intense tree damage was noted along West County Road 38 as an entire row of large trees were completely debarked and denuded. Power poles were snapped, and an outbuilding was also destroyed. As it crossed the state line into Dunklin County in the Missouri Bootheel, high-end EF2 damage occurred as multiple outbuildings, mobile homes, and houses were damaged or destroyed, and many power poles and trees were snapped, with some low-end debarking noted. The tornado then continued south of Hornersville and over the Hornersville Swamp Conservation Area, damaging trees and power poles with a mobile home also sustaining minor damage. Farther to the northeast, the tornado reached EF3 intensity again, twisting or collapsing multiple metal truss transmission towers. A house along the periphery of the circulation sustained minor damage, and some power poles were pushed over as well. The tornado then crossed into Pemiscot County west of Steele at high-end EF2 intensity, snapping and denuding trees, downing power poles, heavily damaging a couple of homes, and tossing a pickup truck. The tornado then passed just south of Braggadocio, damaging or destroying some barns and outbuildings, and inflicting roof damage to homes before abruptly becoming violent and reaching low-end EF4 intensity east of the town. Two homes were obliterated and swept from their foundations with the debris being scattered across fields. A young girl was killed, and her parents and two younger sisters were injured one of the homes. The large wedge tornado then weakened but remained strong as it crossed I-55 just south of Hayti at EF2 intensity, blowing multiple semi-trailer trucks off the highway into a field, injuring the drivers. A car was also thrown, fatally injuring the driver. In addition to the two fatalities, at least nine people overall were injured in the county. An indirect fatality also occurred when a vehicle struck a downed utility pole and two indirect injuries were confirmed as well.

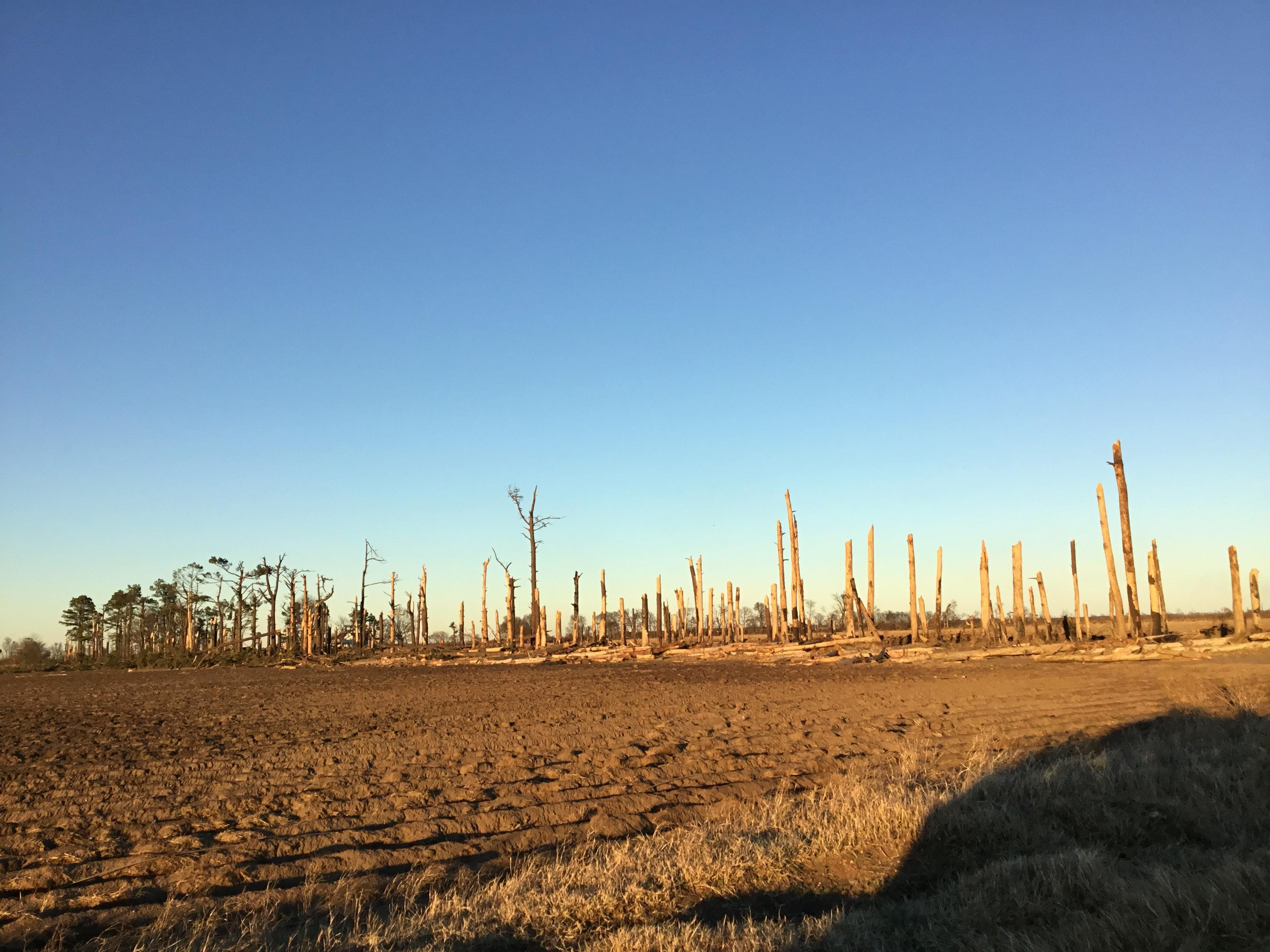
Trees that were completely debarked and denuded near Buckeye, Arkansas.

East of Hayti, the tornado caused additional EF2 power pole damage before crossing the Mississippi River into Lake County, Tennessee. It briefly crossed a bend in the river back into Missouri before crossing into Tennessee again. The tornado then narrowly missed Wynnburg, producing EF2-EF3 damage in rural areas outside of town, where numerous large trees were snapped and denuded, some of which sustained debarking. Some metal high-tension power poles were bent to the ground as well. The tornado then reached its peak intensity for a second time southeast of Tiptonville as it struck the Cypress Point Resort on the southern shore of Reelfoot Lake. A bait and tackle shop was swept away and reduced to a bare concrete slab at low-end EF4 intensity. EF3 damage occurred nearby as multiple cottages, houses, and cabins were destroyed, a couple of two-story hotel buildings had their top floors destroyed with many first floors walls also collapsing, and a gift shop and a restaurant sustained severe damage. Three people were killed at the resort and large amounts of debris were scattered throughout the area. The tornado then crossed the southeastern part of the lake, before moving ashore again as it entered Obion County, causing high-end EF2 damage as it damaged or destroyed cabins, outbuildings, and houses along Lake Drive. A person was killed at a mobile home park when their RV was destroyed. Continuing at high-end EF2 strength, the tornado narrowed as it moved along SR 22 and directly through Samburg. Houses had roofs and exterior walls ripped off, RV campers were tossed, and mobile homes were destroyed. The city hall building, post office, a gas station, and several other buildings were damaged or destroyed as well. Northeast of town, the tornado rapidly weakened to EF1 intensity, blowing the roof off of a farm building and downing trees and tree limbs. Continuing to weaken rapidly, the tornado caused EF0 tree limb damage until it dissipated approximately 2.5 miles (4.0 km) northeast of Samburg at 8:36 p.m. CST (02:36 UTC).

The tornado was rated as a low-end EF4 with winds estimated at 170 mph (270 km/h), reaching a peak width of 1,800 yards (1,600 m) along an 81.17-mile (130.63 km) path through portions of three states, remaining on the ground for 89 minutes. Eight fatalities and one indirect fatality occurred, along with at least 16 injuries and two indirect injuries, some of which were serious. After the tornado dissipated, the parent supercell entered a cycling phase, producing three brief tornadoes, one rated EF1 and the other two rated EF0, in Obion County northeast of Samburg and west of Union City. As the storm passed to the northwest of Union City, it produced a stronger, longer-tracked tornado near Woodland Mills.

=== Defiance–Harvester, Missouri ===
Defiance–Harvester-Maryland Heights, Missouri
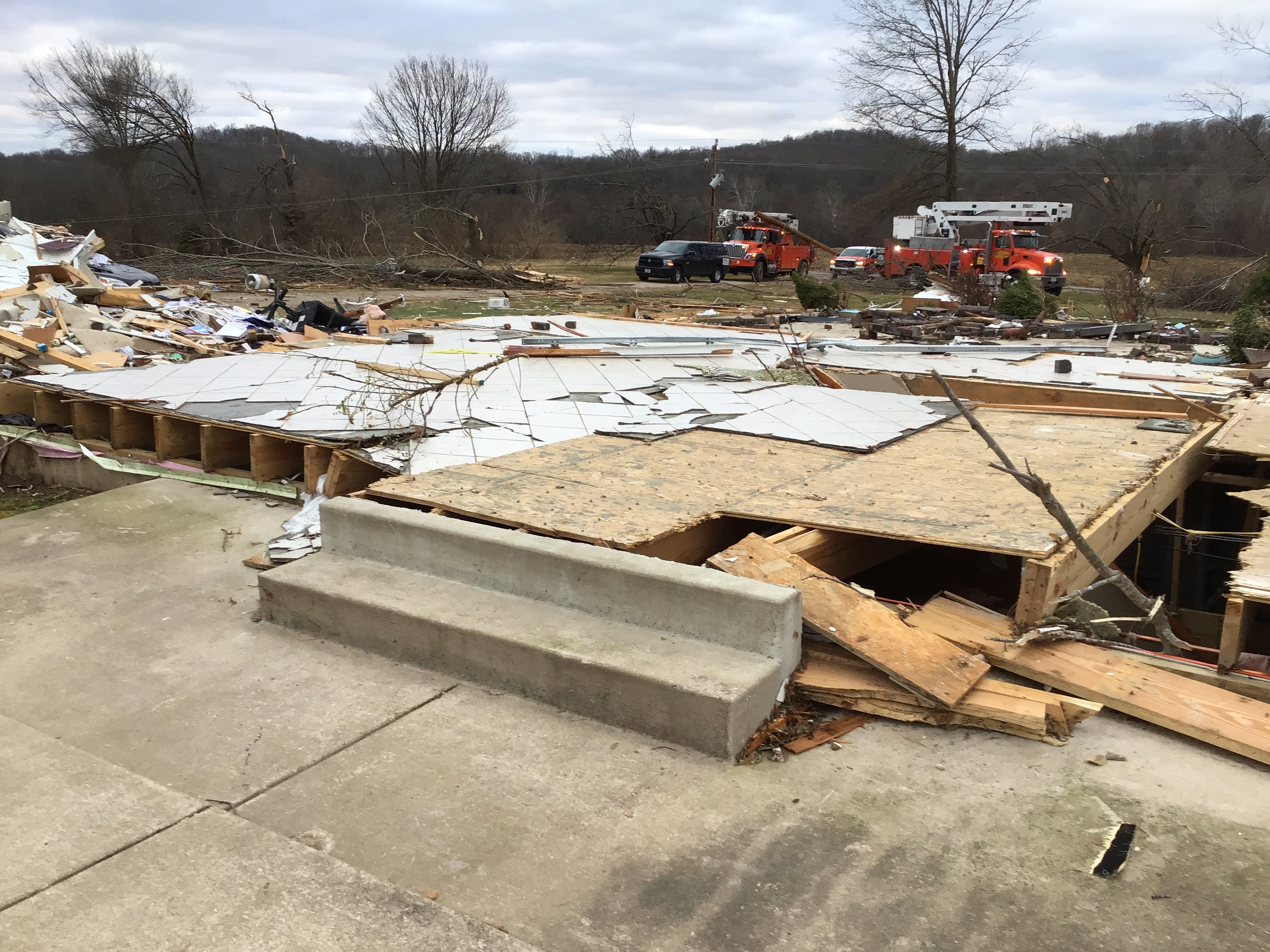
- High-end EF3 damage to a house along Highway F near Defiance, Missouri.

Meteorological history
- Formed: December 10, 7:32 p.m. CST (UTC−06:00)
- Dissipated: December 10, 8:01 p.m. CST (UTC−06:00)
- Duration: 29 minutes

EF3 tornado
- on the Enhanced Fujita scale
- Highest winds: 165 mph (266 km/h)

Overall effects
- Fatalities: 1
- Injuries: 2

A tornado touched down in far west St. Charles County, Missouri, to the north of Route 94 at 7:32 p.m. CST (01:32 UTC). The tornado was initially at low-end EF1 strength, striking its first structures three minutes after it touched down. In this area, the damage was generally limited to the destruction of outbuildings and minor roof damage to a house along Highway T. As the tornado moved northeast to the west of Defiance, it reached EF2 strength as it struck a home and two neighboring outbuildings on Highway F to the north of Femme Osage Creek, destroying both outbuildings and causing less severe damage to the home. As the tornado crossed Highway F, it abruptly strengthened, striking two adjacent homes on the northern side of the road and sweeping both away at high-end EF3 intensity. One of the homes was 110 years old and lacked anchoring, while the other was swept down to its subfloor. One death occurred at this location and two people were injured, suffering abrasions and other injuries. Missouri governor Mike Parson toured this area a couple days later.

The tornado continued northeast, weakening to high-end EF2 intensity as it continued past this area and struck a horse ranch, where a house was left with only interior rooms standing. Outbuildings and barns at that location and neighboring properties were completely destroyed, large trees were snapped, livestock was killed, and another house sustained destruction of its attached garage. A small area of less severe damage occurred as the tornado crossed Red Barn Lane, where multiple adjacent homes had roofing material torn off at low-end EF1 intensity, while some nearby greenhouses at a nursery sustained EF0 damage. As it passed north of Defiance, the tornado regained low-end EF2 strength near the intersection of Highway F and Highway DD. A nearly completed house that was under construction was heavily damaged and shifted off its foundation in this area, while another nearby home had some loss of exterior walls. A third home suffered significant roof damage, many large trees were snapped, and multiple barns and large outbuildings were completely destroyed. The tornado quickly weakened again just beyond this point, as three homes at the end of Matts Way suffered EF1-level roof damage, and trees were snapped in this area as well. EF1 damage continued past this area as some electrical transmission lines at the edge of the Missouri River were downed.

The tornado then crossed the Missouri River into Howell Island Conservation Area, downing trees at EF1 intensity. After crossing the Centaur Chute, the tornado moved into the northern edge of Chesterfield, coming close to a shopping mall as it crossed Route 364. The National Weather Service office in St. Louis was forced to go off air and take shelter as the tornado passed 1.5 miles (2.4 km) to its south. The National Weather Service office in Kansas City took over until the St. Louis branch could continue to operate safely. The tornado moved through a wooded area just north of the shopping mall, snapping numerous trees at high-end EF1 strength. Afterwards, the tornado crossed the Missouri River again, hitting the western edge of Johnson Island, along with the western part of Bonhomme Island. After fully crossing, the tornado would begin traveling directly parallel to Greens Bottom Road. EF1-level tree damage continued to occur in this area, two power poles were snapped, and an outbuilding had its roofing torn off. More trees were downed at EF1 intensity as the tornado moved east, before it crossed the Missouri River for the last time into areas north of the Creve Coeur Airport and an adjacent sports complex. By this point, the tornado had weakened to EF0 strength, and only minor tree damage occurred. After passing to the north of a soccer complex, the tornado continued at EF0 strength before crossing Creve Coeur Mill Road, uprooting a few trees before it dissipated a few hundred feet across from Creve Coeur Creek at 8:01 p.m. CST (02:01 UTC). Overall, one fatality and two injuries were reported, with damages in St. Charles County being estimated at $3.4 million. The cell that produced this tornado produced a second EF3 tornado that would hit Edwardsville, Illinois.

=== Pontoon Beach–Edwardsville, Illinois ===
Pontoon Beach–Edwardsville-Glen Carbon, Illinois
- The tornado as it approached Edwardsville, Illinois.

Meteorological history
- Formed: December 10, 8:27 p.m. CST (UTC−06:00)
- Dissipated: December 10, 8:35 p.m. CST (UTC−06:00)
- Duration: 8 minutes

EF3 tornado
- on the Enhanced Fujita scale
- Highest winds: 150 mph (240 km/h)

Overall effects
- Fatalities: 6
- Injuries: 1

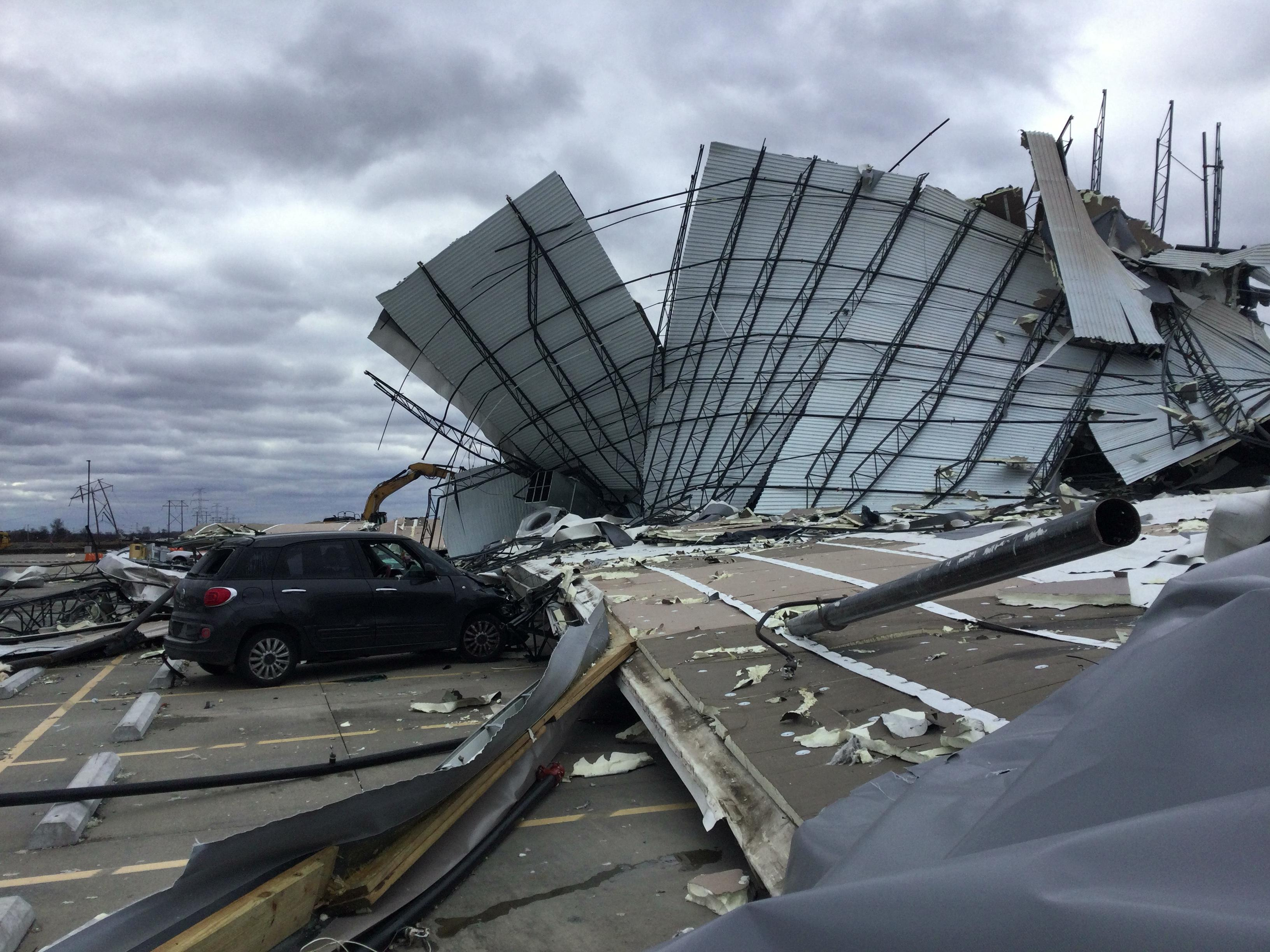
EF3 damage to an Amazon warehouse building and high-tension power lines between Pontoon Beach and Edwardsville, Illinois.

A tornado touched down northeast of Pontoon Beach in Madison County, Illinois, on the northwest side of the intersection of I-255 and I-270, at 8:27 p.m. CST (02:27 UTC) on the evening of December 10. The tornado was initially weak, with damage at the beginning of the path being limited to downed highway signs, a bent light pole, and some orange construction barrels that were tossed around. Damage in this area was rated EF0 to EF1. Rapidly strengthening and growing to a width of 300 yards (270 m), the tornado reached EF3 strength as it tracked northeast towards Edwardsville. It struck an Amazon warehouse along Chain Of Rocks Road, where night workers were beginning their shifts and several employees were attending a Christmas party being held as the tornado approached the facility. Six people were killed when the roof was lifted off the building, and the west-facing walls of the structure collapsed inward, causing a progressive structural failure that resulted in total destruction of most of the warehouse. Employees were told to shelter in bathrooms.

Between 50 and 100 people were trapped in the collapsed remnants of the warehouse, and about 30 survivors were brought to the Pontoon Beach police station in a bus after being extracted from the rubble. One person was air-flown via helicopter to a hospital. Debris from the structure was strewn downwind, cars were thrown from the parking lot, and multiple power poles and metal truss transmission towers were downed nearby. The tornado weakened to high-end EF1 intensity as it crossed Sand Road, snapping trees and completely destroying some outbuildings and an unanchored mobile home. As it entered the southwest side of Edwardsville, the tornado moved through the Sunset Hills Golf and Country Club, causing EF1 damage as trees and power lines were downed, homes sustained roof damage, and sheds were damaged or destroyed. EF0 damage occurred in neighborhoods just beyond this point, with minor tree and roof damage noted. The tornado dissipated near the corner of Doral Court and Butler Boulevard at 8:35 p.m. CST (08:35 UTC) after being on the ground for 4.22 miles (6.79 km). In addition to the six fatalities, one other person was injured.

=== Western Kentucky ===
Western Kentucky
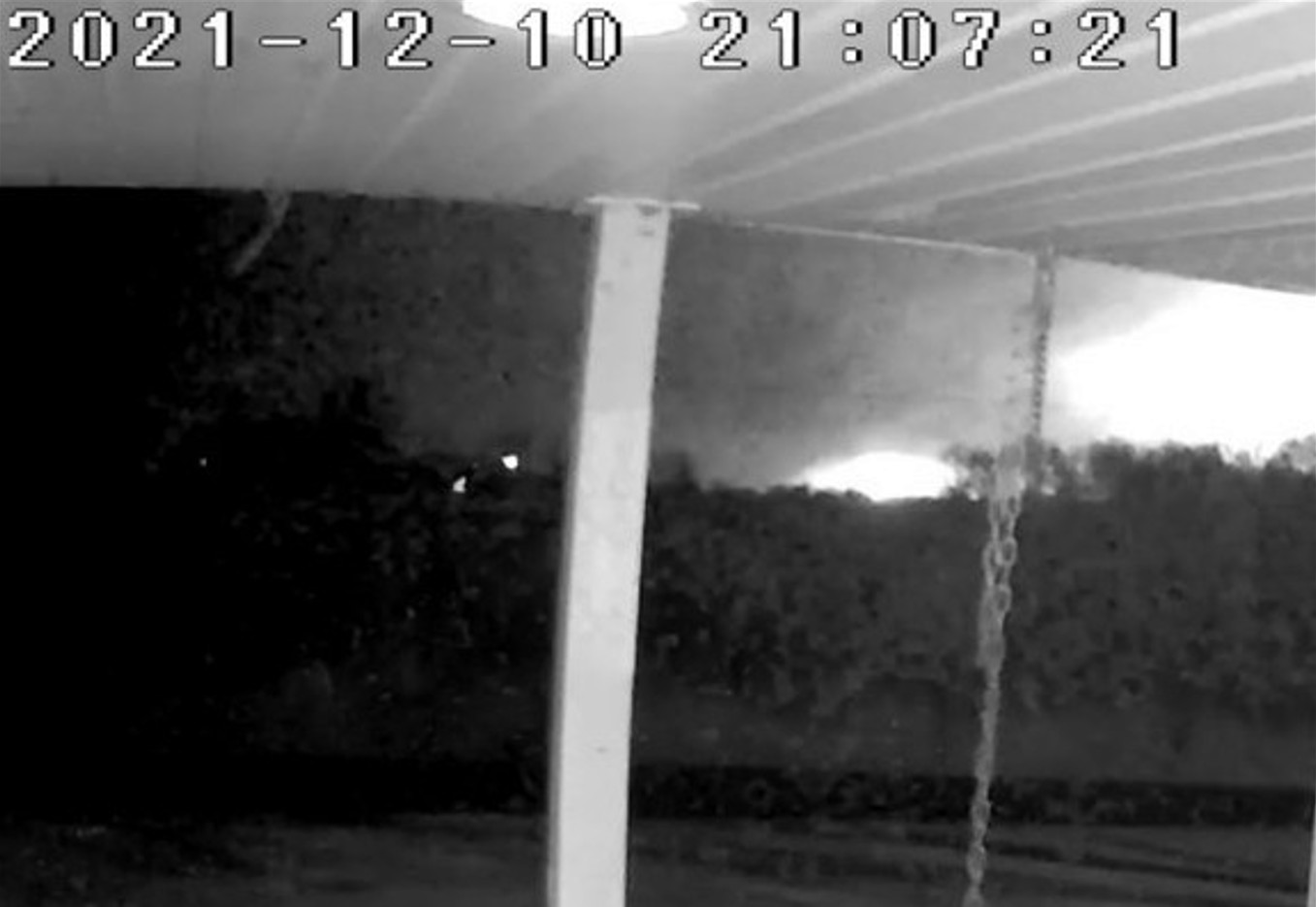
- The Western Kentucky tornado seen near Cayce, Kentucky.

Meteorological history
- Formed: December 10, 8:54 p.m. CST (UTC−06:00)
- Dissipated: December 10, 11:48 p.m. CST (UTC−06:00)
- Duration: 2 hours, 54 minutes

EF4 tornado
- on the Enhanced Fujita scale
- Highest winds: 190 mph (310 km/h)

Overall effects
- Fatalities: 57 (+ 1 indirect)
- Injuries: 519

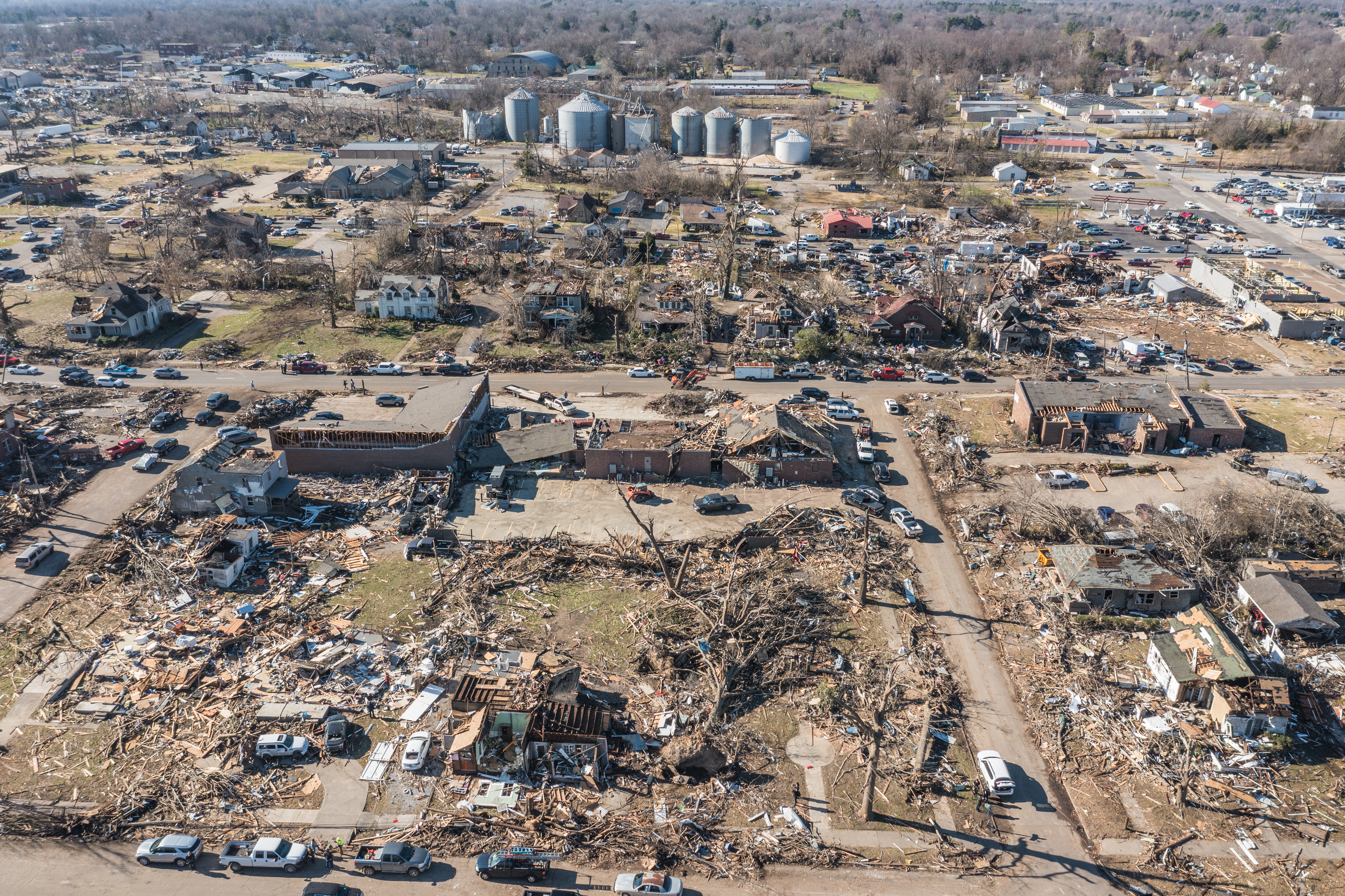
An aerial view of the city of Mayfield, Kentucky, on December 12, taken along North 6th Street.

After the first long-tracked EF4 tornado dissipated over western Obion County, Tennessee, the associated supercell underwent a brief mesocyclone cycling phase, producing three weak, short-lived tornadoes. Minutes later, it spawned this long-tracked, violent and catastrophic tornado in northern Obion County near Woodland Mills at 8:54 p.m. CST (02:54 UTC). The tornado crossed into Kentucky near the community of State Line and rapidly intensified to EF4 strength as it struck Cayce at about 9:00 p.m. CST (03:00 UTC), where major damage occurred to homes, businesses, a school building, and the town's fire station. A few buildings were leveled or swept away. One person was killed in the town, and others were injured. It then moved northeast through rural areas in Fulton and Hickman counties, causing deep scouring of the ground in open fields. Homes and outbuildings were damaged or destroyed, a cell tower was toppled to the ground, and damage in these areas was rated EF2 to EF3.

Search and rescue teams combing through the wreckage of the candle factory in Mayfield on December 13.

Closely paralleling Purchase Parkway and US 45 into Graves County, the tornado moved directly toward Mayfield, entering the southwestern portion of the city at 9:25 p.m. CST as it reached EF4 intensity. One minute later, at 9:26 p.m. CST, the National Weather Service office in Paducah issued a tornado emergency for Mayfield. Radar analysis indicated that debris had been lofted up to 30,000 feet (9,100 m) into the tornado as it struck the town. Catastrophic damage occurred as the violent tornado tore directly through the Mayfield Downtown Commercial District at near high-end EF4 intensity, where numerous large, well-built brick buildings were destroyed, many of which completely collapsed and were left as piles of rubble. Three large churches were destroyed, and the Graves County Courthouse lost much of its roof, its clock tower, and some of its exterior upper-floor walls. The city's fire station, city hall, and police station were also destroyed, and the water tower was blown over and smashed to pieces. Entire neighborhoods were destroyed, with numerous homes being leveled or swept from their foundations, and cars were thrown and mangled. Hundreds of large trees were snapped, denuded, and debarked throughout Mayfield, numerous power lines were downed, and the town's emergency operations center lost the ability to transmit radio communications. About 110 people were left trapped at the Mayfield Consumer Products candle factory when the tornado hit the facility, completely flattening the building to the ground and tossing industrial vehicles. Eight employees were killed, and several others were injured. Allegedly, workers' jobs were threatened if they left the factory between the first and second tornado warnings for the area, and then again after the second tornado warning sounded. The deaths of the workers at the candle factory prompted the launch of an investigation into the facility's protocols by state authorities. Kentucky Governor Andy Beshear stated that over 50 people had died in the city during a live phone interview with Louisville CBS affiliate WLKY on December 11. However, it was later determined that a total of 22 people were killed in Mayfield, and many others were injured.

The tornado's projected path towards several towns prompted the National Weather Service's Paducah office to issue additional tornado emergencies over the next two hours as the tornado tracked to the northeast, devastating multiple small towns and communities. Continuing northeast along I-69 into Marshall County, it continued to produce major damage as it struck the northwestern and northern outskirts of Benton around 9:45 p.m., damaging and destroying numerous homes and outbuildings at EF2 to EF3 strength, and downing countless trees and power poles. Continuing to the northeast, EF4 damage occurred in the lakeshore community of Cambridge Shores at 9:56 p.m. Dozens of large lakeside homes were leveled or swept away, and hundreds of trees were mowed down and debarked. After passing over Lake Barkley and destroying more homes in that area, the tornado moved into Caldwell County through the south edge of Princeton, producing EF4 damage. Many houses were completely leveled at the Princeton Golf and Country Club Subdivision, the University of Kentucky Research Center was destroyed, and four fatalities occurred in the Princeton area. EF4 damage continued as it moved into Dawson Springs around 10:30 p.m. CST. The small town was devastated by the tornado, and residential sections of town were the hardest-hit, as entire blocks of homes were flattened and reduced to rubble. An American Legion post was leveled, an apartment complex was destroyed, vehicles were thrown and piled on top of each other, and multiple large industrial warehouses were completely destroyed as the tornado exited town. A total of 14 people died in Dawson Springs, including a two-month-old baby taken off life support two days after the tornado hit. A photograph was lofted from a destroyed house in Dawson Springs and transported for almost 130 miles (210 km) by the intense tornadic updrafts before it was eventually found in New Albany, Indiana.

In the small community of Barnsley, just south of Earlington, the tornado derailed a CSX freight train, knocking over 25 of the train's freight cars, some of which were thrown from the tracks. One freight car was tossed into a house, and many other homes were completely destroyed in and around Barnsley, and damage was rated high-end EF3. The tornado then intensified dramatically as it struck Bremen, where multiple homes were obliterated and swept away at high-end EF4 strength in the northern part of town. Large trees were completely stripped of their limbs and debarked, grass was scoured from the ground, and cars were lofted through the air and severely mangled in this area. A total of 11 people were killed in and around Bremen, with victims ranging between the ages of five months and 75 years. Among the fatalities was District Judge Brian Crick, who represented both Muhlenberg and McLean counties, as confirmed in a statement from the Supreme Court of Kentucky on December 11. Multiple residents suffered injuries that required medical attention.

Crossing into Ohio County, the tornado passed just north of Centertown and Hartford, crossing US 231, I-165 and the Rough River. EF2 to EF3 damage occurred in this area as multiple houses sustained major structural damage or were destroyed, metal power poles were snapped, mobile homes were obliterated, and many large trees were snapped and twisted. Large hay bales, RV campers, and tractors were thrown along this segment of the path as well. The tornado crossed the Rough River a total of eleven times in Ohio, Grayson and Breckinridge counties, producing EF1 to EF2 damage to many structures, and downing countless trees along its northeastward track. After crossing the river for a final time northeast of Falls of Rough, it re-entered Grayson County and dissipated at 11:48 p.m. CST (5:48 UTC) as it began to enter Rough River Dam State Resort Park near Rough River Lake, approximately four miles (6.4 km) west of McDaniels. The tornado was on the ground for nearly three hours, with a path length of 165.6 miles (266.5 km), a Kentucky state record and one of the longest continuous paths in recorded history.

=== Kenton–Dresden, Tennessee/Pembroke, Kentucky ===
Kenton–Dresden-Martin, Tennessee/Pembroke-Lafayette, Kentucky
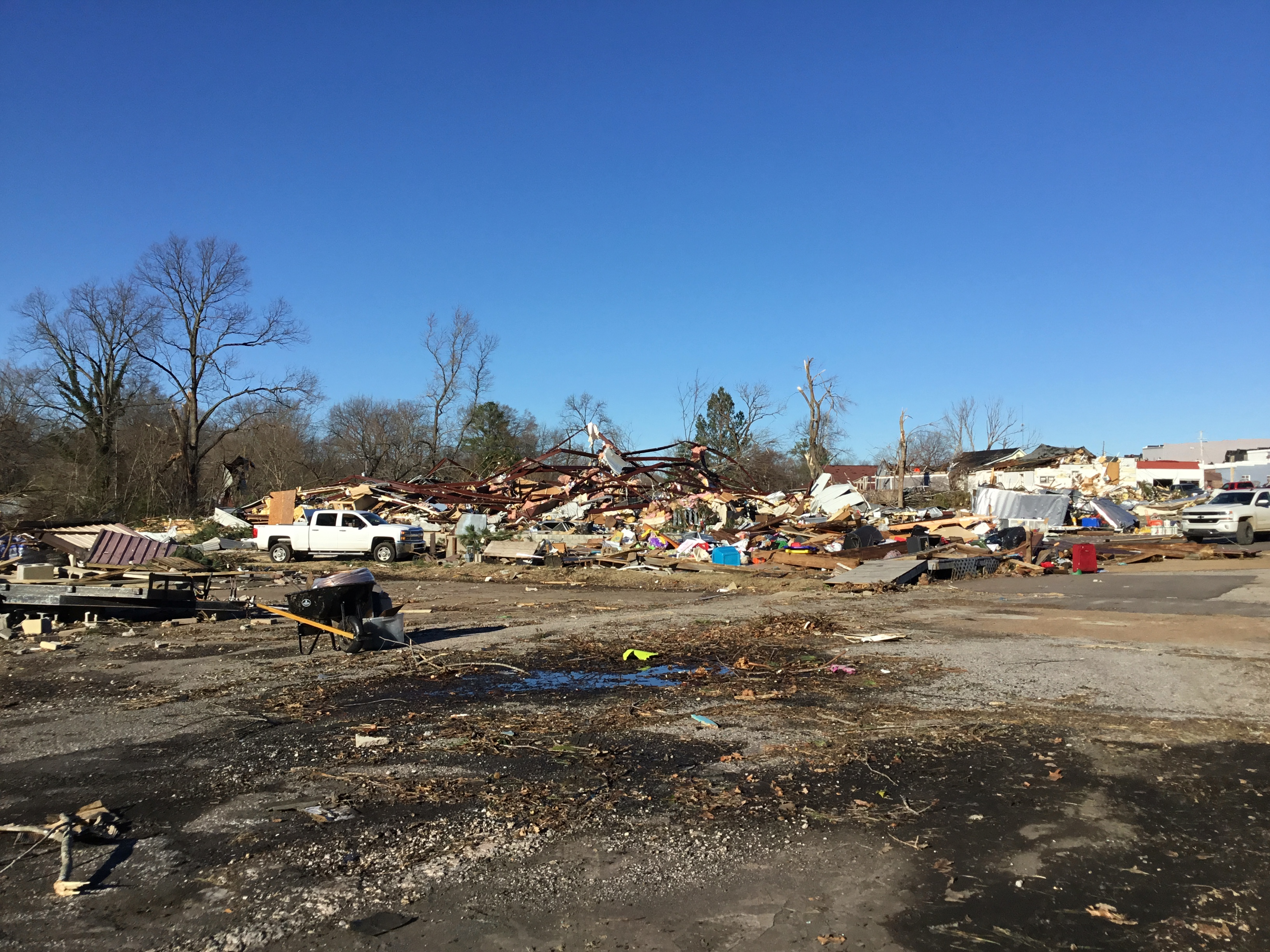
- EF3 damage to a metal building in Dresden, Tennessee.

Meteorological history
- Formed: December 10, 10:32 p.m. CST (UTC−06:00)
- Dissipated: December 11, 12:36 a.m. CST (UTC−06:00)
- Duration: 2 hours, 4 minutes

EF3 tornado
- on the Enhanced Fujita scale
- Highest winds: 160 mph (260 km/h)

Overall effects
- Fatalities: 0
- Injuries: 38

This intense, long-tracked tornado first touched down in the northeastern part of Newbern in Dyer County, Tennessee, at 10:32 p.m. CST and quickly intensified as it moved northeastward at EF2 strength. Several homes suffered significant damage to their roofs and garages, and some houses had carports ripped off. Many trees were snapped or uprooted, and power lines were downed. The most significant damage in Newbern occurred along Washington Street, where a gas station was destroyed. The metal canopy over the gas pumps was blown away, and the convenience store was completely destroyed, leaving two people trapped inside who had to be extracted from the rubble. A detached garage was also destroyed with the debris scattered downwind, and an elementary school and a vocational school also sustained damage. Exiting Newbern and moving to the northeast, the tornado weakened to EF1 intensity and crossed into Gibson County, where tree damage occurred and a house along Cool Springs Road had part of its roof blown off. As it crossed Baseline Road, it ripped roofing material and a screened-in patio off of a house, and blew in one of its exterior walls. Trees and power poles were snapped in this area, and damage was rated low-end EF2. As it crossed Morella Road farther to the northeast, it produced EF3 damage as a house was destroyed and left with only interior rooms standing. A nearby three-story home had its top floor blown off, another house was unroofed and pushed off of its foundation, and the damage to those two residences was rated EF2.

The strong tornado then struck Kenton, causing severe damage as it moved through residential areas in the southern part of town. Numerous homes had their roofs torn off and were heavily damaged, and a majority of the damage in Kenton was rated EF2. However, one house along South Poplar Street had its roof removed and exterior walls collapsed, earning an EF3 rating. Sheds and detached garages were destroyed, and many large trees were snapped or uprooted in town, some of which landed on houses. It then weakened and clipped the southeast corner of Obion County, before entering Weakley County and passing north of Sharon. EF1 damage to trees and structures was noted along this portion of the path. Past Sharon, the tornado began to strengthen again, reaching EF2 strength as it partially destroyed a one-story home near the corner of SR 89 and Macedonia Church Road. High-end EF2 damage occurred along Deer Run Drive as the tornado followed SR 89 to the northeast. Homes in this area sustained loss of their roofs and upper-floor exterior walls, and one house had its entire second story blown away and destroyed. The tornado then reached high-end EF3 intensity and caused major damage as it tore directly though Dresden. The downtown section of Dresden was severely damaged, and multiple brick businesses sustained major structural damage, a few of which were completely destroyed. The First United Methodist Church, the Dresden Fire Department, the Dresden Enterprise newspaper office, a market, a hardware store, restaurants, convenience stores, two automotive repair shops, and other buildings all sustained significant damage or were destroyed. Some metal-framed buildings were also destroyed, and the Weakley County Courthouse sustained some minor damage to its exterior. Vehicles were flipped and tossed and numerous homes were damaged or destroyed, including a couple of small homes that were leveled or swept from their foundations. Many large trees were snapped, denuded, or uprooted throughout Dresden, and debris from buildings was left scattered throughout the town, with some left tangled in power lines or wrapped around trees. At least one person was injured, and approximately 100 structures were badly damaged or destroyed in town. The tornado then weakened again and continued to the northeast, causing EF1 tree damage in rural areas of Weakley County.

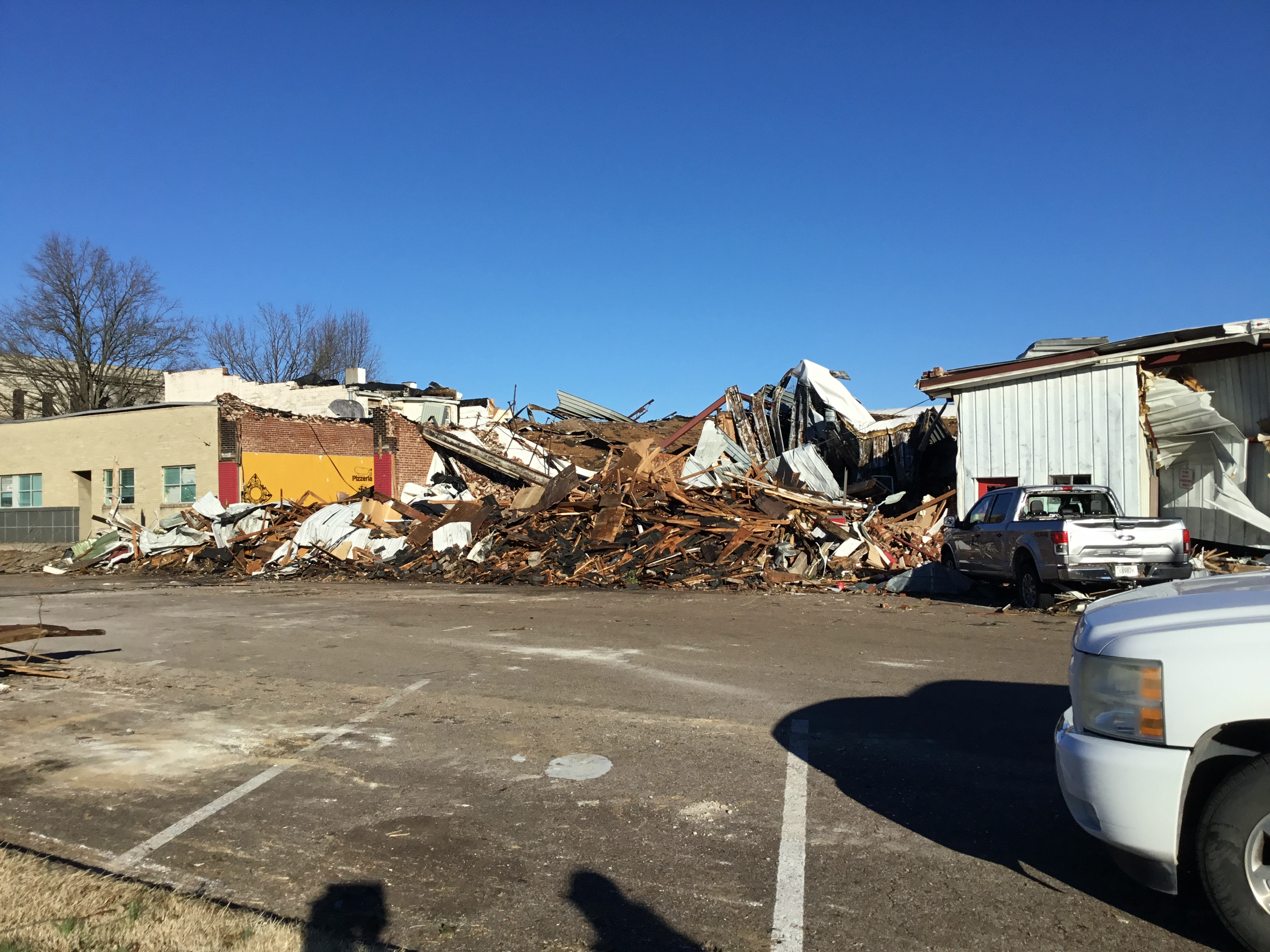
EF3 damage to businesses in downtown Dresden, Tennessee.

The tornado then moved into Henry County and continued south of Cottage Grove at EF3 intensity. It produced severe damage along Cox Road and Veasey Road, where it tore the second story off a two-story home, while leaving another nearby house with only interior walls standing. A mobile home was also thrown across a road and destroyed in this area. Farther northeast, EF3 damage continued as a well-built brick home along Blake School Road was completely shifted off of its foundation, with its deck destroyed and several walls knocked down. Several other homes along this part of the path sustained partial to total roof loss, trees were downed, while grain silos and a number of outbuildings were destroyed. The tornado then weakened as it crossed US 641, and a building sustained EF1 roof damage in this area. The tornado began to strengthen again as it moved through rural areas to the southeast of Puryear, and EF2 damage occurred along Old Paris Murray Road, where a cabin and a barn were destroyed. A mobile home was destroyed, another mobile home was damaged by falling trees, and a house had shingles ripped off along this segment of the path as well, and damage to those structures was rated EF1. Further strengthening occurred and high-end EF2 damage was noted near Buchanan, as homes along SR 140 sustained roof and exterior wall loss, and debris was scattered into fields. Other homes in this area were damaged to a lesser degree, and many trees were downed, with damage in those areas rated EF1. The tornado continued to the northeast past Oak Hill and through the small community of Cypress Creek near the western shore of Kentucky Lake. Numerous homes sustained considerable roof damage in Cypress Creek, and hundreds of trees were downed, some of which landed on houses. Some mobile homes were damaged or destroyed as well, and damage along this section of the path was rated EF1 to EF2. Five people were injured in Henry County. Weakening to EF0 strength, the tornado clipped the Fort Donelson National Battlefield in the extreme southeast corner of Calloway County, Kentucky, knocking down some trees. It then moved across Kentucky Lake and into Stewart County, Tennessee. Moving through the Tennessee portion of the Land Between the Lakes National Recreation Area, the tornado intensified again and downed thousands of trees. It caused EF2 damage as it passed to the south of Bumpus Mills, where a well-built brick home had its roof and second story torn off. Farm outbuildings were also destroyed, a few barns and single-wide trailers were flattened, and other single-wide and double-wide mobile homes had their roofs lifted off. Four people were injured in Stewart County. The tornado continued northeast across the far northwest corner of Fort Campbell Army Base, continuing to blow down trees before entering Christian County, Kentucky.

Passing just south of Lafayette, Kentucky, two large barns were destroyed, several electrical transmission lines and many trees were knocked down, a house along Old Clarksville Pike sustained roof damage, and damage near Lafayette was rated EF2. Maintaining EF2 intensity, the tornado moved over mostly open country before causing significant damage to several homes on Boddie Road and Darnell Road to the south of Herndon. A church sustained damage to its roof and steeple in this area, while silos and irrigation pivot sprinklers were destroyed as well. On Palmyra Road, EF2 damage continued to occur as several homes, farm outbuildings, and other structures were badly damaged or destroyed. Farther to the northeast, a mobile home was completely demolished, trees and power poles were snapped, barns were destroyed, a house had its roof torn off, while other homes sustained roof and garage damage near Herndon Oak Grove Road, and damage was again rated EF2. Maintaining its strength, the tornado approached I-24, where numerous trees were snapped or uprooted, a garage was destroyed, and some houses sustained roof damage. Along Fort Campbell Blvd (US 41A), EF1 to EF2 damage occurred as a mile-wide swath of wooden power poles was snapped, a tall silo was blown over, many trees were downed, a house had damage to its roof, and barns were destroyed. The tornado then inflicted EF2 damage to a tobacco farm along Bradshaw Road, causing millions of dollars in damage. Four tobacco barns, three equipment garages, and multiple silos were destroyed on the property, while two outbuildings were damaged and a house sustained roof damage as well. Continuing to the northeast at EF2 strength, the tornado struck the town of Pembroke directly, where numerous large trees were snapped or uprooted, and multiple homes sustained considerable roof damage, including two houses that had their roofs torn off along Mason Lane at the south edge of town. Garages, grain silos, and outbuilding structures were damaged or destroyed in town, and Pembroke Elementary School had much of its roof blown off. Some brick buildings in downtown Pembroke were also heavily damaged, including a church that had its steeple torn off. As the tornado exited town and moved to the northeast, two mobile homes were completely destroyed at low-end EF2 strength, injuring the occupants. Crossing into Todd County, the tornado weakened to EF1 intensity and damaged more outbuildings and downed more trees. A large two-story house along Maton Road sustained broken windows and had minor roof damage. Some additional EF1 tree damage occurred just beyond this point before the tornado dissipated at Tress Shop Road west of Elkton at 12:36 a.m. CST (06:36 UTC), with straight-line winds becoming dominant beyond this point. Despite the severe damage in multiple areas along the path, no fatalities occurred, although 38 people were injured. The total path length of the tornado was 122.91 miles (197.80 km), the second-longest tracked tornado of the outbreak. The supercell associated with this tornado produced another EF3 tornado approximately 12 miles (19 km) to the east in Logan County, and yet another EF3 tornado in Bowling Green.

=== Bowling Green, Kentucky ===
==== First tornado ====
Bowling Green-Plum Springs, Kentucky
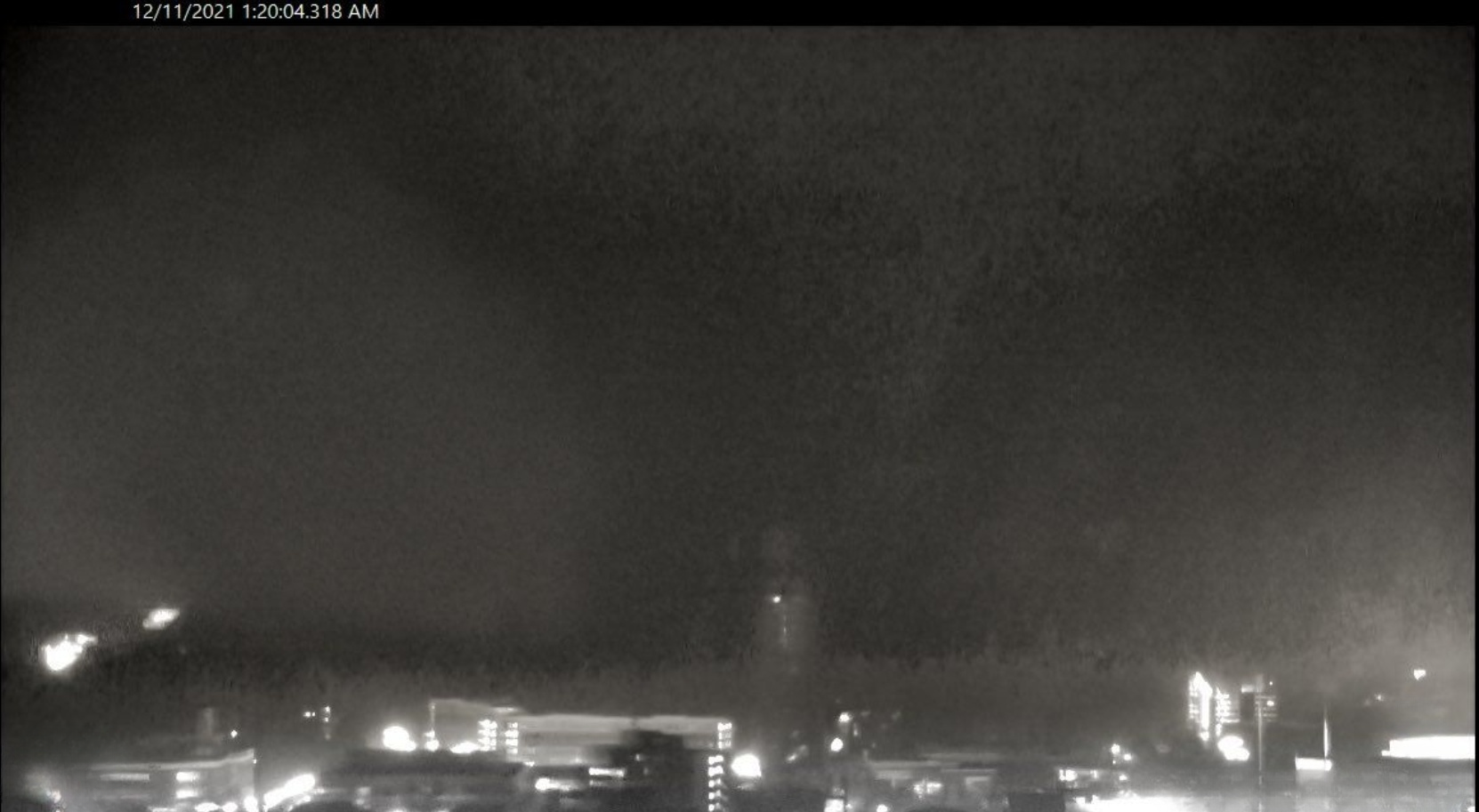
- The first Bowling Green tornado at EF3 intensity near the Western Kentucky University campus.

Meteorological history
- Formed: December 11, 1:09 a.m. CST (UTC−06:00)
- Dissipated: December 11, 1:38 a.m. CST (UTC−06:00)
- Duration: 29 minutes

EF3 tornado
- on the Enhanced Fujita scale
- Highest winds: 165 mph (266 km/h)

Overall effects
- Fatalities: 17
- Injuries: 63

After the Logan County EF3 tornado lifted, the same supercell produced this intense, destructive, and deadly tornado at around 1:09 a.m. CST (07:09 UTC) on December 11 in Warren County, southwest of Bowling Green. It first touched down south of the intersection of Wimpee Smith Road and Petros Browning Road, where EF0 tree damage occurred. Near Tommy Smith Road, the tornado quickly strengthened and reached EF2 intensity. Many trees were downed, a 1,700-pound (770 kg) horse trailer was thrown 300 feet (91 m) into a ravine, while multiple barns and farm buildings were completely destroyed in this area. Just northeast of this point, high-end EF2 damage occurred as the tornado crossed KY 1083, where multiple homes and outbuildings were damaged or destroyed. This included one house that sustained complete removal of its roof and exterior walls, and was left with only an interior hallway standing. Based on scouring of corn stubble in fields, and analysis of damage patterns visible in aerial drone video taken in this area, damage surveyors determined that the tornado displayed an unusual internal structure during this initial portion of its path. There appeared to be a smaller circulation that produced an intense, narrow path of damage embedded within a broader, weaker circulation that caused less intense damage. The tornado weakened to EF1 strength as it crossed Van Meter Road and Fuqua Road, but continued to cause extensive tree damage. A one-story home also sustained minor roof damage along Fuqua Road. Additional EF1 damage occurred as it crossed LC Carr Road and Blue Level Road, where some barns and outbuildings were damaged, homes sustained siding and gutter damage, and trees were snapped. The Zomi Agape church sustained considerable roof damage, and insulation from the building was strewn in all directions. As the tornado began to enter the western fringes of Bowling Green, it rapidly intensified and became strong again as it produced EF3 damage to homes along Rembrandt Court. Here, multiple homes were destroyed and left with only interior rooms standing, one of which was moved 15 feet (4.6 m) off of its foundation. It crossed I-165 into more densely populated areas of the city as an EF3 tornado. By this time, during live severe weather coverage on ABC/Fox affiliate WBKO; the station's tower camera was pointed toward the western sections of Bowling Green as the tornado approached. It captured a massive power failure in that part of the city as several transmission lines were knocked down by the tornado, before the station's studio facility (located along US 68/KY 80 and I-165) briefly lost electricity as the tornado passed just north of the station .

After crossing the interstate, the rapidly-intensifying tornado struck the Creekwood subdivision, where devastating damage occurred as numerous homes were completely destroyed. Some of the worst damage in the subdivision occurred along Moss Creek Avenue, where dozens of homes were leveled or swept from their foundations. Damage surveyors noted that these homes were built on poorly constructed cinder block foundations, and damage in this area was rated high-end EF3. A car rental business, a Marathon gas station, and some other buildings were also destroyed, while a Sonic Drive-In, Royal Motor Cars, two auto parts stores, a Shell gas station, and a Mexican restaurant were badly damaged. Trees and power poles were snapped, a dumpster was thrown 250 yards (230 m), and metal light poles were bent to the ground. Multiple homes in the nearby Springhill and Crestmoor subdivisions had roofs and attached garages ripped off, and large trees were uprooted.

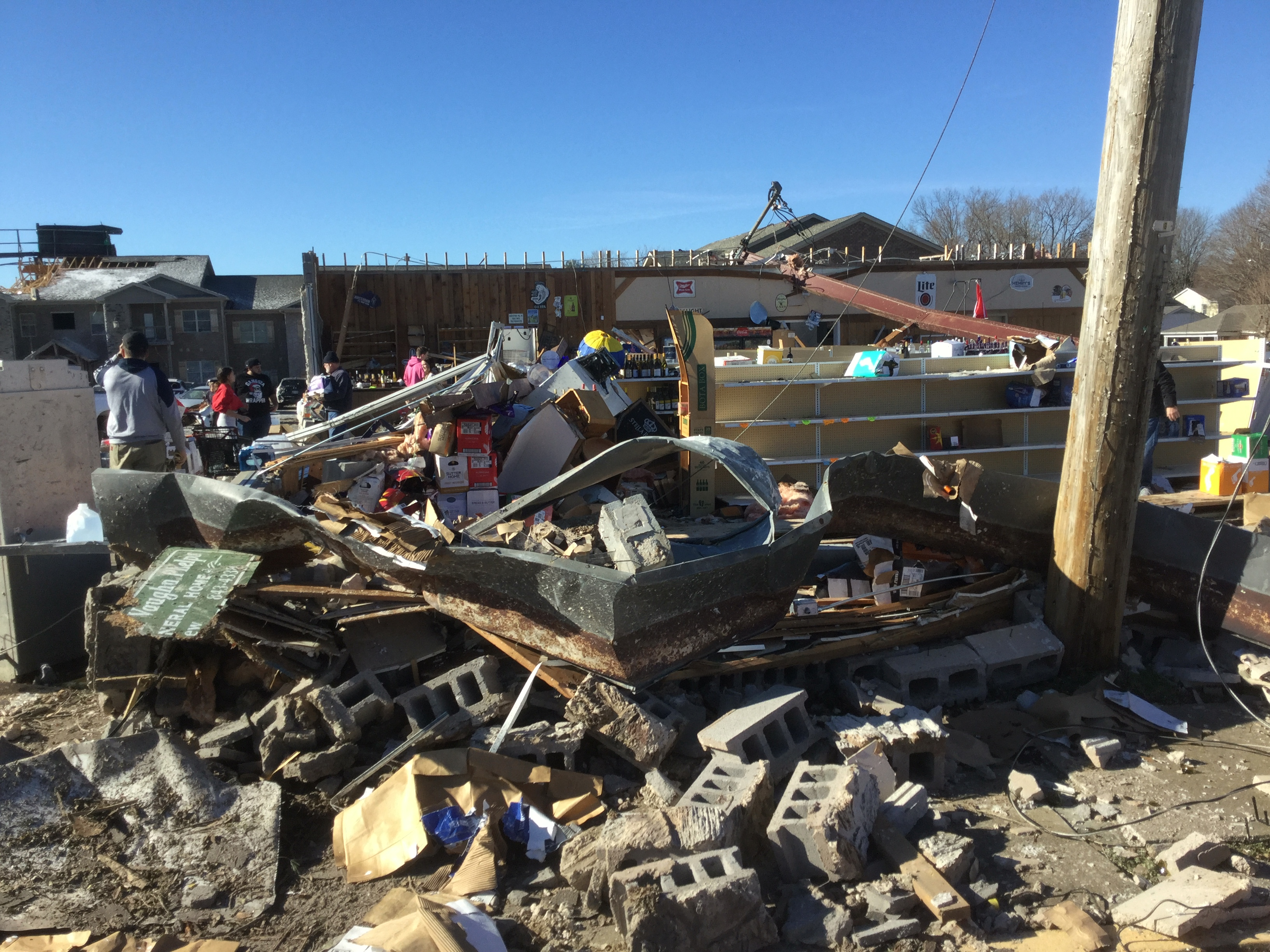
A liquor store that was destroyed in the western part of Bowling Green, Kentucky.

The tornado then crossed Collett Avenue and weakened to high-end EF1 intensity, following Nutwood Street and Covington Street to the east-northeast before moving through the Briarwood Manor and Indian Hills subdivisions. Damage along this segment of the path consisted of mainly minor to moderate damage to homes, including shattered windows, garage doors blown in, gutters torn off, and roof shingles removed. However, a few houses sustained more severe damage, with half or more of their roofs blown off. Many trees and power lines were downed, cars and garden sheds were overturned, while fencing and detached garages were destroyed. Past the Corvette plant, the damage path turned in a more easterly direction again, and the tornado weakened back to EF1 intensity as it moved through the intersection of Bristow Road and Friendship Road. A barn and a greenhouse were destroyed within this vicinity, and power poles were downed. Houses in this area sustained mainly roof, gutter, and siding damage, though one home had a large section of its roof torn off. Shortly beyond this point, it turned sharply back to the northeast and caused additional EF1 damage as it moved across Kelly Road, where some trees were downed and an outbuilding was damaged.

The tornado then rapidly intensified again and reached peak intensity as it struck an industrial park near US 68, damaging or destroying multiple large industrial buildings at high-end EF3 strength. The well-built TMS Automotive warehouse was leveled by the tornado, with large metal structural supports torn from their anchor plates. A metal flag pole near one business was bent to the ground, leveraging its heavy concrete footing out of the ground in the process, and some light poles were bent over as well. A box truck was also thrown and destroyed, part of which was found 100 yards (91 m) away. The tornado then weakened to EF2 strength, but continued to inflict heavy damage as it struck a Crown Verity plant; a cookware manufacturer, near the north side of US 68. The building sustained major damage, with large amounts of metal debris strewn through nearby fields. EF1 damage was noted along Mizpah Road, where fencing and trees were downed, a flag pole was bent, and some additional industrial buildings had damage to their exteriors, with metal siding and insulation scattered across fields. EF1 damage continued into Edmonson County, where trees were downed near the Dripping Springs community. The tornado then lifted and dissipated at 1:38 a.m. CST (07:38 UTC) near Cedar Springs, after causing one final area of EF1-strength tree damage along KY 259. The path length of the tornado was 29.26 miles (47.09 km). In total, 17 people were killed and 63 people were injured by this tornado.

==== Second tornado ====
Bowling Green, Kentucky
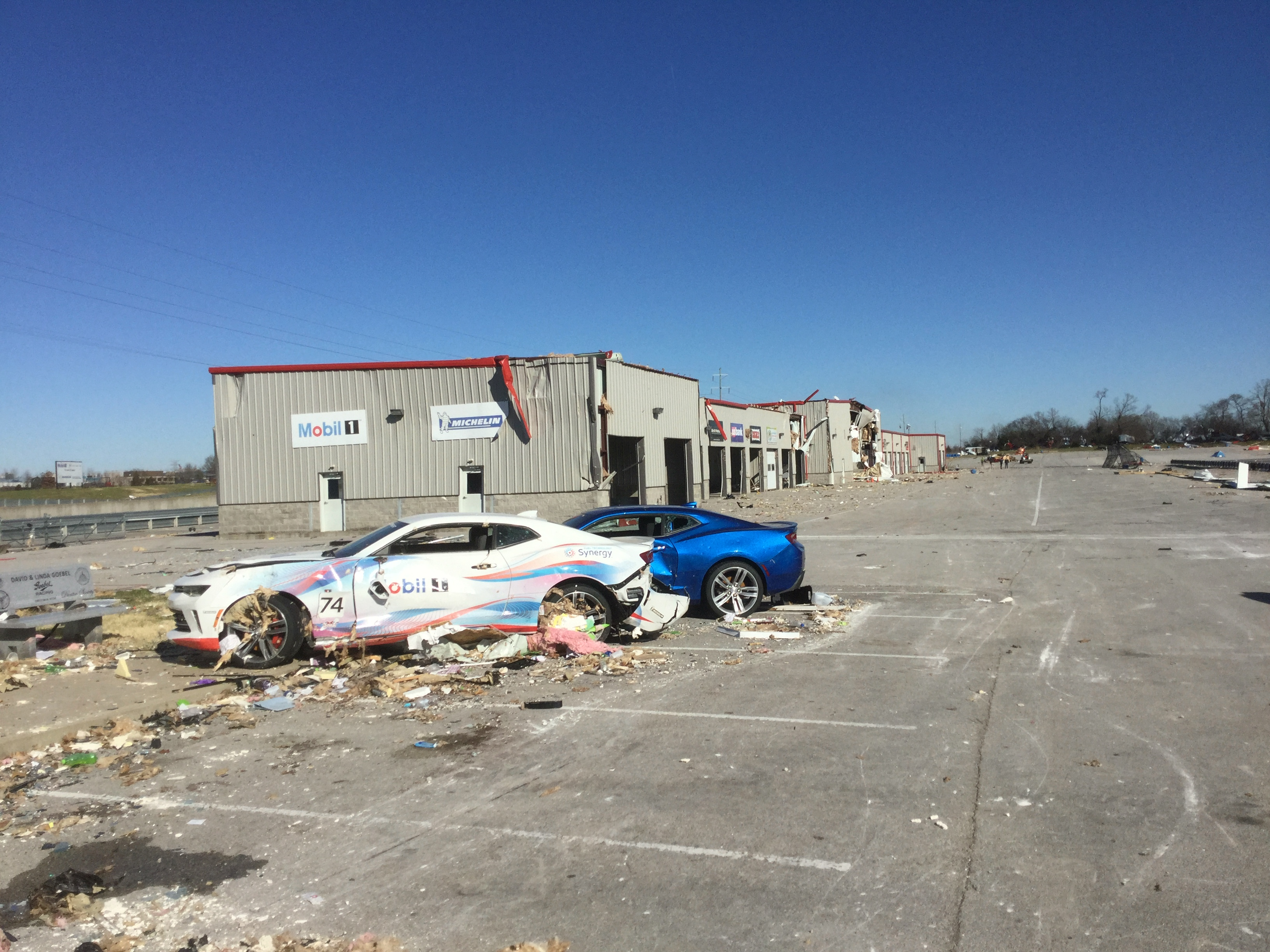
- EF2 damage to garages and cars at NCM Motorsports Park.

Meteorological history
- Formed: December 11, 1:19 a.m. CST (UTC−06:00)
- Dissipated: December 11, 1:24 a.m. CST (UTC−06:00)
- Duration: 5 minutes

EF2 tornado
- on the Enhanced Fujita scale
- Highest winds: 125 mph (201 km/h)

Overall effects
- Fatalities: 0
- Injuries: 0

As the EF3 tornado moved through areas just south of downtown Bowling Green, a second tornado formed as a result of a separate, smaller circulation within the same parent supercell. It first touched in the southeastern part of Bowling Green at 1:19 a.m. CST (07:19 UTC), near the Bowling Green–Warren County Regional Airport. It first damaged a small metal storage building along Searcy Way, then caused significant roof damage to a well-built airplane hangar as it moved across the airport grounds. Damage along this initial part of the path was rated EF1. An anemometer at the airport recorded an 63 mph (101 km/h) wind gust as the tornado passed by, though it was not directly hit by the tornado. The tornado continued at high-end EF1 strength as it moved to the northeast, parallel to I-65. It grew to 200 yards (180 m) wide, striking apartments and townhouses at The Hub apartments. These structures sustained extensive roof and window damage, with garages at the complex suffering the most intense damage. Trees were also downed in this area. Additional damage to trees and roofs occurred in a neighborhood just north of Lovers Lane Park. The tornado became strong as it crossed Mount Victor Lane, where a house was heavily damaged and shifted off of its foundation, and damage to that residence was rated low-end EF2. It weakened again as it crossed the Barren River just east of the path of the main EF3 tornado, which followed moments later. Homes and apartment buildings along McFadin Station Street suffered considerable roof and siding damage, and trees and power lines were downed, with damage in this area being rated EF1. Just beyond this point, extensive tree damage occurred and a barn was destroyed near Porter Pike. The tornado then reached peak strength, producing EF2 damage as it struck NCM Motorsports Park on the south side of the interstate.

The main building, a series of automobile repair garages, and some metal storage buildings sustained extensive damage at this location, with large sections of roofing and exterior walls ripped off of the structures. Structural debris was scattered over a half-mile to the east-northeast, and several cars were moved and damaged by flying debris. At this point the tornado was roughly 225 yards (206 m) wide, and the damage track of the main EF3 tornado near the Corvette plant was visible just across the interstate. The tornado weakened as it paralleled the interstate, causing EF1 damage along McGinnis Road and Bristow Road. An unanchored mobile home was destroyed, numerous trees were downed, and siding, gutter, and roofing damage was observed at several homes along this segment of the path. Just beyond this point, the tornado caused some additional EF0 tree damage before it dissipated near mile marker 29.2 along I-65 at 1:24 a.m. CST (07:24 UTC), southeast of Plum Springs, after traveling 6.1 miles (9.8 km).

=== Saloma–Bradfordsville, Kentucky ===
Saloma–Bradfordsville, Kentucky
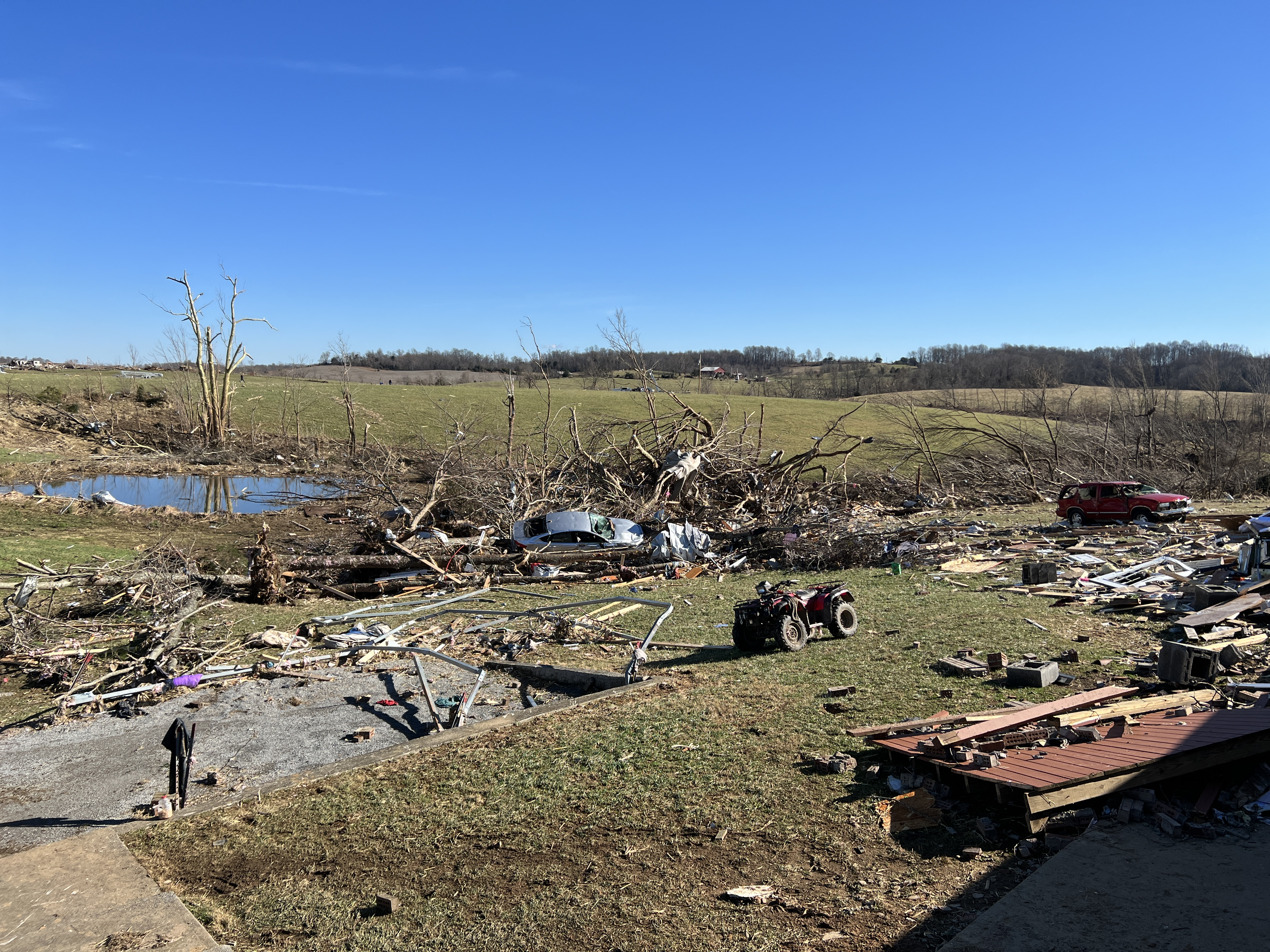
- The remnants of a completely destroyed home strewn into a pond and nearby trees along with two destroyed vehicles near Saloma, Kentucky.

Meteorological history
- Formed: December 11, 2:20 a.m. CST (UTC−06:00)
- Dissipated: December 11, 2:36 a.m. CST (UTC−06:00)
- Duration: 16 minutes

EF3 tornado
- on the Enhanced Fujita scale
- Highest winds: 145 mph (233 km/h)

Overall effects
- Fatalities: 1
- Injuries: 31

The last EF3 tornado to occur during the outbreak touched down in Taylor County, Kentucky along Chaney Creek Road northwest of Saloma at 2:20 a.m. CST (08:20 UTC). It moved northeastward at EF1 strength and crossed Wade Lane. A couple of homes had roof damage, some barns and outbuildings were damaged, trees were downed, and a fenced-in peacock enclosure was destroyed in this area. The tornado then strengthened to EF2 intensity as it moved across Quisenberry Road, where multiple mobile homes were obliterated and a woman was killed in one of them. It then caused high-end EF2 damage as it crossed KY 527, heavily damaging or destroying several outbuildings and completely removing the second story of a brick home. A commercial building was completely destroyed at this location as well, and hundreds of large trees were snapped or uprooted as the tornado crossed Big Pitman Creek. The tornado reached its peak intensity near the rural community of Hobson as it crossed Sanders Road at EF3 intensity. Three poorly anchored homes were completely swept away in this area, two of which were reduced to their subfloors, while a third had its subfloor torn off and blown away, leaving only the home's basement foundation behind. A couple of other homes sustained major structural damage, including one that had its entire second floor torn off and destroyed. Trees were snapped and partially debarked, vehicles were thrown and mangled, and some ground scarring was noted in aerial surveys of this area.

Just to the northeast, the tornado weakened to high-end EF2 intensity at the intersection of Pleasant Hill Church Road and Feather Creek Road, where a small house was completely destroyed and another house was heavily damaged and had its roof torn off. The tornado then crossed KY 289 at mid-range EF2 strength and moved through a series of fields and wooded areas, snapping or uprooting numerous trees, damaging the roof of a house, and destroying an outbuilding. EF2 damage continued to as the tornado moved across KY 634, where several barns and a few mobile homes were completely destroyed and debris was strewn across fields. A silo was also destroyed, a frame home had much of its roofing material torn off, and hundreds of additional trees were snapped as the tornado moved through more wooded areas. It briefly weakened back to EF1 intensity as it moved east and crossed US 68, where a metal building suffered considerable roof damage. Past US 68, the tornado caused EF1 to EF2 damage as it caused major tree damage and struck several properties along KY 208. Some mobile homes, barns, and outbuildings were destroyed here, while frame homes sustained damage to their roofs and exteriors. A path of EF1 to EF2 damage continued as it crossed Bald Knob Road and KY 1157 near the Greenbriar community. A double-wide mobile home was destroyed, a two-story house suffered major damage to its roof and attached garage, and many trees and several power poles were snapped along this segment of the path. Some more barns and outbuildings were also destroyed, and livestock was killed as well. After crossing Rolling Fork Creek, the tornado began to weaken as it continued to the northeast, causing EF1 damage to trees and outbuildings, a few of which were destroyed. One final small area of significant damage occurred along KY 49, where a barn was destroyed at low-end EF2 intensity, while nearby trees were downed and a small outbuilding had EF1 damage. Immediately after crossing KY 49, the tornado dissipated north of Bradfordsville at 2:36 a.m. CST (08:36 UTC). One person was killed, and 31 others were injured.

== Non-tornadic effects ==
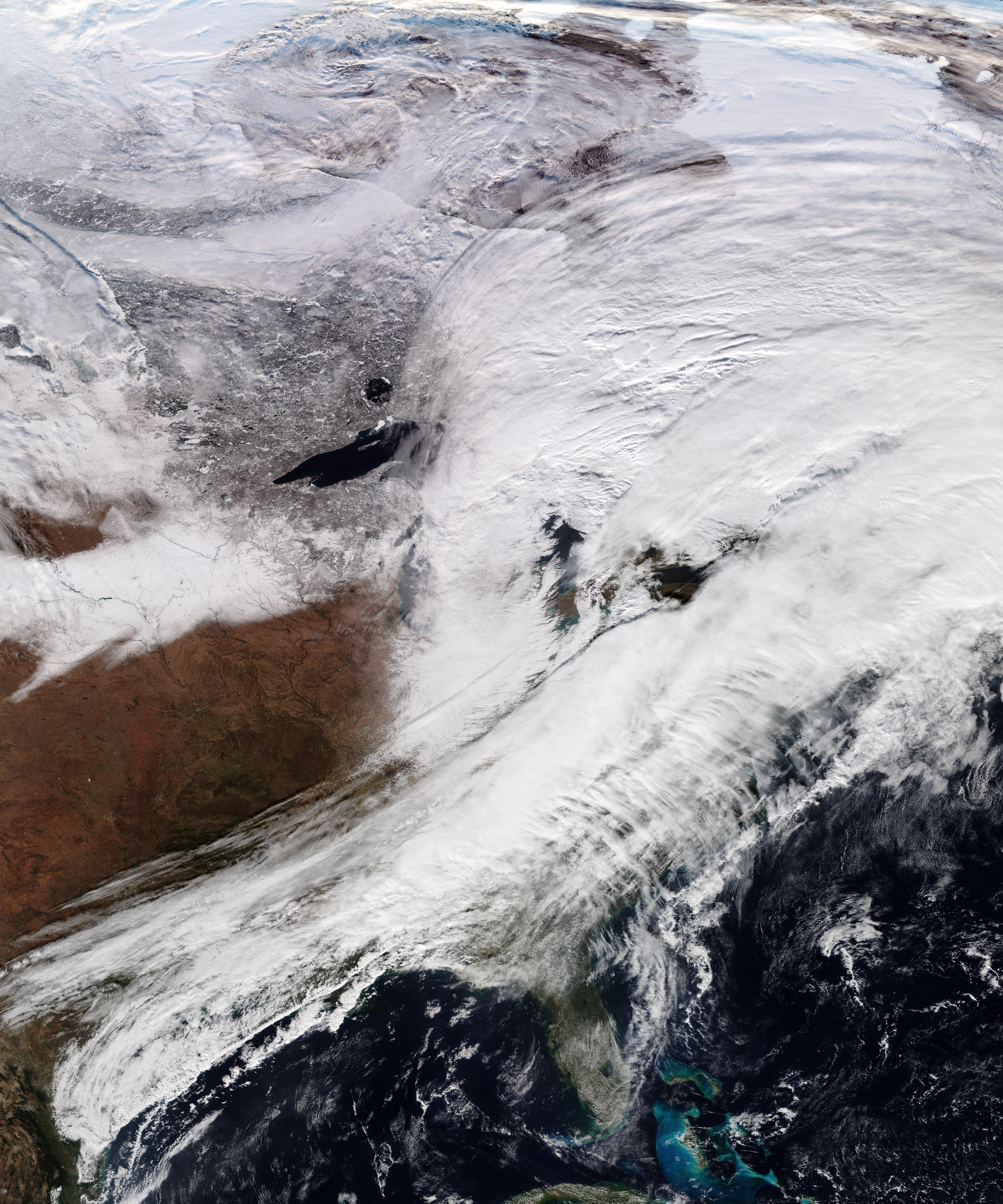
A satellite view of the extratropical cyclone that was responsible for the tornado outbreak on December 11.

The initial winter storm, unofficially referred to by The Weather Channel (TWC) as Winter Storm Atticus, entered the Western United States on December 9. The storm brought the first measurable snowfall of the rainy season to Utah. In southern Wyoming and Colorado, the storm dropped a maximum total of 3 feet (0.91 m) of snow in the mountains. The storm led to Denver seeing 0.3 inches (0.76 cm), which became their first snowfall of the winter, the latest date on record for this occurrence. On December 10, Las Vegas dipped to 32 °F (0 °C) for the first time since February 5, 2020.

In Minnesota, some towns and cities received over one foot (30 cm) of snow. The Twin Cities received a maximum total of 21 inches (53 cm) of snow, making the winter storm the heaviest snowstorm recorded in the area since another blizzard in April 2018. Minneapolis and St. Paul each declared snow emergencies. In the Twin Cities, Metro Transit reported that half of its busses were delayed. More than 250 flights were canceled at Minneapolis–Saint Paul International Airport. Near Faribault, a seven-car pileup occurred on I-35. Minnesota State Patrol reported 232 crashes, causing 19 injuries. The National Weather Service issued winter storm warnings for part of Minnesota during the December 10.

In South Dakota, Sioux Falls issued a snow alert. The Lincoln County Sheriff's Office issued a no-travel alert. Several highways, including I-229 and I-90 were snow-covered. Numerous school districts around the area cancelled classes on December 10.

The storm system brought wind gusts up to 60 mph (95 km/h) to Lower Michigan and northern Indiana. Nearly 200,000 customers were left without power in Michigan as the storm passed through, while more than 7,000 customers lost power in Wisconsin.

In Canada, winds gusting to 62 mph (100 km/h) uprooted trees and caused property damage and multiple power outages across Southern Ontario and the St. Lawrence River Valley. More than 300,000 customers in Ontario and Québec lost power.

New York saw over 100,000 power outages, including 41,000 in Erie County. Wind gusts in Western New York reached 70 mph (110 km/h) and in the New York metropolitan area reached 50 mph (80 km/h). Waves reached 20 feet (6.1 m) along the Lake Erie coastline, forcing multiple parks to close. On December 11, both New York City and Buffalo saw record highs, at 67 °F (19 °C). Newark, New Jersey, also set a record high of 69 °F (21 °C) at the unusual time of 7:30 p.m. as well.

== Impact and aftermath ==
Outbreak death tollDirect tornado-related deaths
State	Fatalities	County	Fatalities
Arkansas	2	Craighead	1
Arkansas	2	Mississippi	1
Illinois	6	Madison	6
Kentucky	74	Caldwell	4
Kentucky	74	Fulton	1
Kentucky	74	Graves	21
Kentucky	74	Hopkins	17
Kentucky	74	Lyon	1
Kentucky	74	Marshall	2
Kentucky	74	Muhlenberg	11
Kentucky	74	Taylor	1
Kentucky	74	Warren	16
Missouri	3	St. Charles	1
Missouri	3	Pemiscot	2
Tennessee	4	Lake	3
Tennessee	4	Obion	1
Total	89		

Nine states were affected by the outbreak with five states being heavily impacted; homes and businesses incurring severe damage in many communities along the path of each of the storms, many of which collapsed and were reduced to rubble. The tornadoes resulted in 89 fatalities, 74 of which occurred in Kentucky, and hundreds of injuries.

As of December 13, three days after the outbreak took place, 26,000 buildings were without power, while 10,000 were without water and an additional 17,000 were placed under boil-water advisories in Kentucky. Also in Kentucky, estimates indicated between 60,000 and over 80,000 people were without power across the state. In Trigg County, over 14,000 residents were left without power. In Taylor County, one woman was killed. Officials in the county said major damage occurred, but the extent is not known. Rescue workers said many structures were destroyed in the county. Injured individuals were transported to a nearby medical facility. Western Kentucky University canceled commencement ceremonies scheduled for December 11, due to the EF3 tornado that hit Bowling Green the previous night and caused citywide power outages affecting the campus. In Bremen, a video of a man surreptitiously recorded playing Bill Gaither's "Jesus, There's Something About That Name" on a piano in his destroyed house was shared by many people. Jason Crabb, who was from nearby Beaver Dam, invited the man, Jordan Baize, to play the song on the Grand Ole Opry on December 17.

In Bowling Green, one indirect storm-related fatality occurred, involving a man who died from a heart attack while helping clean up debris at his daughter's house; in Franklin County, a man was killed when his truck was swept into floodwaters along Benson Creek.

Local National Weather Service operations were impacted during the outbreak, forcing two offices to briefly suspend operations. The power outages caused by the storms resulted in the National Weather Service's Paducah office temporarily transferring warning responsibilities for its County Warning Area to the agency's Springfield, Missouri, office, and NOAA Weather Radio stations operated by the Paducah office temporarily went off-the-air in parts of the state during the outbreak. Employees at the National Weather Service's St. Louis office, located in Weldon Spring, were forced to take shelter and temporarily suspend operations as an EF3 tornado passed just south of the facility around 7:45 p.m. CST on December 10.

In Arkansas, a semi-trailer truck overturned on the northbound lane of I-555 in Poinsett County (southwest of Trumann), due to straight-line winds associated with the supercell; natural gas that was being carried inside the truck leaked onto the highway, resulting in the closure of both lanes of the highway for most of the evening.

In Indiana, damage was mostly limited to power outages from the storms and trees falling into houses and onto vehicles, with only one person being hospitalized. At least 17,000 Duke Energy customers, 12,500 AES Indiana customers, 12,500 Indiana Michigan Power Co. customers, and 1,300 South Central Indiana REMC customers lost power due to the storms.

In Tennessee, more than 130,000 people were left without power in the state as a result of the storms. TVA infrastructure was damaged in West Tennessee, resulting in power loss for all of Decatur and southern Henderson counties. Power remained out in Decatur County into the next week, resulting in the county school system being closed the whole week. A tree fell on a home in Shelby, resulting in a non-tornadic fatality.

On December 14, nine Tennessee counties were granted federal emergency assistance due to the damage from the storms: Lake, Obion, Dyer, Gibson, and Weakley counties in West Tennessee; and Cheatham, Dickson, and Stewart counties in Middle Tennessee, all of which had been heavily impacted by tornadoes, along with Decatur County, which had sustained county-wide power failure.

=== Rescue and recovery ===
Recovery efforts are currently underway, as disaster-aid and humanitarian groups, such as the American Red Cross, The Salvation Army, Adventist Community Services, and World Vision are collecting donations and traveling to or shipping relief items to affected areas to provide aid. At least 1,000 families were left homeless or had their properties severely damaged. Kentucky state parks provided free housing to those who could not go back to their homes. Up to 450 National Guard members were activated to help out with recovery in Kentucky. Several firefighters in the Crescent Township, Pennsylvania, volunteer fire department are planning to travel to Mayfield on December 21 to help with cleanup, bringing donated supplies.

=== Companies affected ===
Multiple workers at the Mayfield Consumer Products candle factory that was destroyed when the long-track EF4 tornado hit Mayfield, Kentucky, alleged that supervisors told them they would be fired if they left their shifts early ahead of the storm's direct hit on the city. Company spokespeople have denied the allegations. On December 17, it was reported that multiple workers (only one was named due to fear of reprisal) filed a class-action lawsuit against the company. The lawsuit alleged that the company had up to three and a half hours to allow employees to leave before the tornado hit the factory and showed a flagrant indifference to the rights of the workers. It was later brought to light that the factory had committed 12 OSHA safety violations in 2019, for which they were forced to pay a fine of $9,810 (2019 USD); specific violations included one stating that safeguards during emergency situations must be working properly at all times, one stating that there had to be people who could perform first aid and one stating that first aid supplies need to be available. The Kentucky OSHA board is currently investigating the factory.

On December 11, Amazon founder and executive chairman Jeff Bezos issued a statement about the impact to the company's Edwardsville, Illinois, warehouse on Twitter: "The news from Edwardsville is tragic. We're heartbroken over the loss of our teammates there, and our thoughts and prayers are with their families and loved ones. All of Edwardsville should know that the Amazon team is committed to supporting them and will be by their side through this crisis. We extend our fullest gratitude to all the incredible first responders who have worked so tirelessly at the site." Bezos was criticized on social media for issuing his response to the tragedy approximately 23 hours after the tornado destroyed the warehouse, and for attending the scheduled third launch of the New Shepard 4 suborbital vehicle that morning despite the tragedy. OSHA is currently investigating the deaths at the warehouse; the warehouse has no prior violations on record.

An Amazon driver stationed at the Edwardsville base delivering packages was told she would be fired by her supervisor if she went back to the Edwardsville base upon tornado sirens going off. She had previously mentioned tornado warnings had been issued 32 minutes prior. The supervisor waited for Amazon to contact them to say what to do; at that point, she was told to shelter in place. An Amazon spokesperson later stated the supervisor did not follow standard safety protocols, specifically stating that the supervisor should have told the driver to return upon hearing tornado sirens and that they should not have threatened the driver's employment.

An Amazon employee from near Campbellsville, Kentucky, went viral on Twitter after being turned around by police and being unable to reach the warehouse for her shift due to search and rescue efforts and damage from an EF3 tornado in Taylor County. When she attempted to notify Amazon's Human Resources department about the issue she was told they had no record of tornadoes in Kentucky and penalized her. It was not until she tweeted in response to Amazon's Retail Chief Dave Clark about the issue later in the day that the issue was resolved.

=== Political ===
"I promise you, whatever is needed — whatever is needed — the federal government is going to find a way to provide it."

— U.S. President Joe Biden, to Kentucky Governor Andy Beshear

On December 11, U.S. President Joe Biden approved a federal emergency disaster declaration for the state of Kentucky. On December 12, he approved a major disaster declaration for Kentucky. Biden also stated that he would approve emergency declarations for other states if they submitted them, which ultimately were submitted by Tennessee and Illinois on December 13. Biden also stated that he would visit the areas affected by the storm after it was certain he was "not going to get in the way of the rescue and recovery". The White House later announced that Biden would travel to Fort Campbell on December 15, where he would be briefed on the storms, and then visit the affected communities of Mayfield and Dawson Springs. While in Dawson Springs, he stated that the damage was "beyond belief". Biden also announced that the federal disaster coverage would be upped to cover 100% (from 75%) of costs for debris removal and emergency protective measures over the next 30 days in Kentucky.

Missouri Governor Mike Parson visited both St. Charles and Pemiscot counties in the aftermath of the EF3 tornado that cut through those areas. Earlier on December 11, Governor Beshear declared a state of emergency for parts of western Kentucky. Beshear also announced the creation of a tornado relief fund and asked people to donate blood, as donated blood was running low throughout the pandemic. Kentucky Senator Mitch McConnell visited areas of Bowling Green, stating that he had not seen worse damage since the 1974 Louisville tornado.

== See also ==
- Weather of 2021
- List of North American tornadoes and tornado outbreaks
  - List of tornadoes with confirmed satellite tornadoes
- List of F4 and EF4 tornadoes
  - List of F4 and EF4 tornadoes (2020–present)
- 1925 tri-state tornado outbreak – another deadly tornado outbreak that produced a long-tracked tornado which crossed through three states on March 18, 1925
- 1953 Vicksburg, Mississippi tornado – a deadly tornado that struck in early December
- Tornado outbreak of March 2–3, 2012 – another outbreak that produced several deadly, long-tracked tornadoes in Kentucky almost ten years earlier
- December 2015 North American storm complex – the last time before this outbreak a violent tornado (EF4/EF5) occurred in the United States in December
- Tornado outbreak of December 16–17, 2019 – a tornado outbreak that struck the Southern United States in mid-December
- Tornado outbreak of March 31–April 1, 2023 – another deadly tornado outbreak that impacted the same areas
