= Mayfield Downtown Commercial District =

Historic district in Kentucky, United States

- U.S. National Register of Historic Places
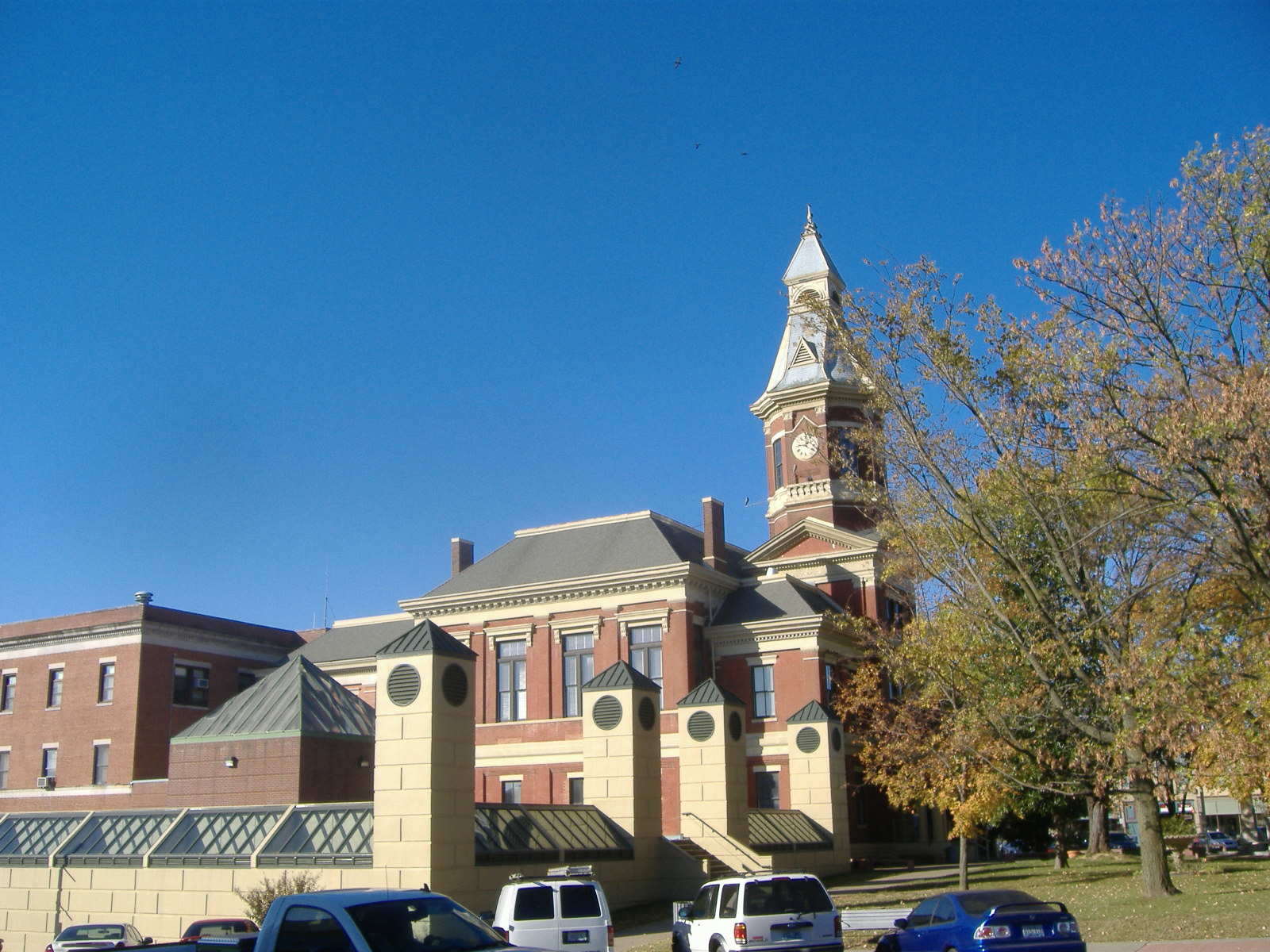

- Location within Kentucky Location within the United States
- Location: Roughly bounded by North, Water, 5th and 9th Sts., Mayfield, Kentucky
- Coordinates: 36°44′28″N 88°38′09″W
- Area: 27 acres (11 ha) (original); 18.4 acres (7.4 ha) (increase)
- Architect: Multiple
- Architectural style: Late Victorian, Classical Revival (original); Prairie School, Early Commercial, Bungalow/craftsman (increase)
- NRHP reference No.: 84001477

Significant dates
- Added to NRHP: August 16, 1984
- Boundary increase: July 25, 1996

The Mayfield Downtown Commercial District is a historic district in Mayfield, Kentucky which was listed on the National Register of Historic Places in 1984. The listing was increased in 1996.

The original 27 acres (11 ha) area included 77 contributing buildings; the 18.4-acre (7.4 ha) increase added 21 more.

It includes the Graves County Courthouse, built in 1888 at cost of $40,000, the fourth courthouse at the location.

Many of the buildings in the district, including the courthouse, suffered major to catastrophic damage on December 10–11, 2021, as a long-track EF4 tornado directly hit the city. Of the 98 buildings listed in the district, only four remain standing.
