= List of tornadoes in the outbreak of December 10–11, 2021 =

On December 10–11, 2021, a significant and deadly tornado outbreak occurred across the Central United States. The tornado outbreak produced 71 tornadoes, with the bulk of the activity coming from a very long-tracked supercell that produced several very long-track and violent tornadoes, one of which was on the ground for almost 3 hours and traveled 165 miles (266 km) and killing 57 people.

== Confirmed tornadoes ==
Confirmed tornadoes by Enhanced Fujita rating
EFU	EF0	EF1	EF2	EF3	EF4	EF5	Total
1	17	29	16	6	2	0	71

=== December 10 event ===
List of confirmed tornadoes – Friday, December 10, 2021 (Note: All dates are based on the local time zone where the tornado touched down; however, all times are in Coordinated Universal Time for consistency.)
EF#	Location	County / Parish	State	Start Coord.	Time (UTC)	Path length	Max width
EF0	SW of Emerald Mountain	Elmore	AL	32.4364°N 86.1324°W	22:12–22:13	0.19 mi (0.31 km)	50 yd (46 m)
EF0	A brief, weak tornado occurred just northeast of Montgomery and southeast of Wetumpka, causing some roof and fence damage to several homes.						
EF1	SE of Niangua	Webster, Wright	MO	37.345°N 92.75°W	00:13–00:23	6.34 mi (10.20 km)	75 yd (69 m)
EF1	Outbuildings and two barns were damaged or destroyed, and a few homes sustained minor damage.						
EFU	N of Weldon to SSW of Amagon	Jackson	AR	35.4747°N 91.2306°W	00:15–00:23	6.69 mi (10.77 km)	150 yd (140 m)
EFU	A tornado was caught on video over farmland; no damage was observed. This tornado was the first produced by the Quad-State supercell.						
EF0	Weiner	Poinsett	AR	35.6067°N 90.9342°W	00:40–00:43	2.97 mi (4.78 km)	50 yd (46 m)
EF0	Trees were downed in and around town, one of which fell on a house. This tornado was the second produced by the Quad-State supercell.						
EF0	NE of Wellsville	Montgomery	MO	39.0749°N 91.5897°W	00:55–01:00	4.27 mi (6.87 km)	50 yd (46 m)
EF0	A weak tornado downed trees and damaged corn crops.						
EF1	S of Jonesboro	Craighead	AR	35.7084°N 90.7330°W	00:57–01:01	6.14 mi (9.88 km)	150 yd (140 m)
EF1	A storage building was destroyed, a cotton gin was damaged, and several trees were downed. This tornado was the third produced by the Quad-State supercell.						
EF0	W of Bay	Craighead	AR	35.7326°N 90.5971°W	01:03–01:04	1.31 mi (2.11 km)	50 yd (46 m)
EF0	Trees were downed, and storage buildings sustained minor damage. This was the fourth tornado produced by the Quad-State supercell.						
EF4	N of Bay, AR to S of Hayti, MO to NE of Samburg, TN	Craighead (AR), Mississippi (AR), Dunklin (MO), Pemiscot (MO), Lake (TN), Obion (TN)	AR, MO, TN	35.7867°N 90.5511°W	01:07–02:36	81.17 mi (130.63 km)	1,800 yd (1,600 m)
EF4	8 deaths – See article on this tornado – This was the fifth tornado, and first violent tornado produced by the Quad-State supercell. 16 people were injured.						
EF1	NW of Branson West	Stone	MO	36.708°N 93.387°W	01:37–01:40	0.62 mi (1.00 km)	75 yd (69 m)
EF1	Around 20 homes sustained roof and siding damage, and trees and power lines were downed.						
EF3	WNW of Augusta to Defiance to E of Harvester	St. Charles, St. Louis	MO	38.598°N 90.907°W	01:35–02:01	24.77 mi (39.86 km)	150 yd (140 m)
EF3	1 death – See section on this tornado – 2 people were injured.						
EF2	SSW of Virginia to ESE of Chandlerville	Cass	IL	39.8954°N 90.2398°W	01:47–01:59	12.75 mi (20.52 km)	200 yd (180 m)
EF2	This tornado caused significant damage to a farmstead, heavily damaging a home and destroying several farm buildings. One horse was killed, and another was injured. A grain bin was destroyed, storage tanks were overturned, power poles were snapped or damaged, and trees were downed.						
EF1	NW of Merriam Woods	Taney	MO	36.761°N 93.224°W	01:49–01:52	1.57 mi (2.53 km)	100 yd (91 m)
EF1	Numerous trees were uprooted.						
EF1	Diaz	Jackson	AR	35.6324°N 91.2636°W	02:06–02:07 (1 minute)	0.5 mi (0.80 km)	80 yd (73 m)
EF1	Apartment buildings were damaged in Diaz, as were structures at a nearby park. Several trees were also uprooted.						
EF2	NE of Atterberry	Menard	IL	40.0607°N 89.9153°W	02:07–02:16	4.56 mi (7.34 km)	250 yd (230 m)
EF2	A strong tornado severely damaged or destroyed several sheds and outbuildings. A house sustained significant roof damage, while many large trees were snapped or uprooted. A center pivot irrigation system was overturned.						
EF2	Northern Augusta to S of Tupelo	Woodruff, Jackson	AR	35.3038°N 91.3689°W	02:13–02:22	10.5 mi (16.9 km)	500 yd (460 m)
EF2	This high-end EF2 tornado touched down in the northern part of Augusta, where several homes suffered major structural damage and roof loss as it moved northeastward. Many trees were snapped or uprooted, and farm buildings were severely damaged. Three people were injured in this area. The tornado continued northeastward through rural farmland, destroying two farm shops and several grain bins, damaging trees, and blowing down powerlines before dissipating after crossing the county line.						
EF3	SW of Edwardsville	Madison	IL	38.757°N 90.058°W	02:27–02:35	4.22 mi (6.79 km)	300 yd (270 m)
EF3	6 deaths – See section on this tornado – One person was injured.						
EF1	SSW of Beedeville	Jackson	AR	35.4077°N 91.125°W	02:30–02:31 (1 minute)	0.5 mi (0.80 km)	30 yd (27 m)
EF1	Trees were uprooted and several travel trailers were blown over.						
EF1	W of Jonesboro	Craighead	AR	35.822°N 90.919°W	02:30–02:35	4.62 mi (7.44 km)	75 yd (69 m)
EF1	A barn was damaged and 12 utility poles were snapped northeast of Cash.						
EF1	SW of Central City	Muhlenberg	KY	37.257°N 87.184°W	02:32–02:37	2.7 mi (4.3 km)	75 yd (69 m)
EF1	Along the Western Kentucky Parkway, a metal building had some of its walls damaged and a significant portion of its roof removed. In addition, a church sustained minor structural damage, and a house had roof damage and windows blown out. Numerous trees were downed and a road sign was blown about one-tenth mile (0.16 km) as well.						
EF1	NE of Samburg	Obion	TN	36.4192°N 89.2733°W	02:39–02:40 (1 minute)	0.68 mi (1.09 km)	100 yd (91 m)
EF1	Trees were uprooted. This tornado was the first of three brief tornadoes in the path break between the first EF4 tornado and the second EF4 tornado.						
EF0	W of Union City	Obion	TN	36.4066°N 89.2241°W	02:41–02:44	3.09 mi (4.97 km)	80 yd (73 m)
EF0	Trees were downed, and storage buildings were damaged. This was the second of three brief tornadoes in the path break between the first EF4 tornado and the second EF4 tornado.						
EF0	WNW of Union City	Obion	TN	36.4430°N 89.2139°W	02:43–02:44 (1 minute)	0.39 mi (0.63 km)	50 yd (46 m)
EF0	Several trees were downed. This was the third of three brief tornadoes in the path break between the first EF4 tornado and the second EF4 tornado.						
EF0	E of Fisher	Poinsett	AR	35.4845°N 90.9068°W	02:45–02:47	0.5 mi (0.80 km)	25 yd (23 m)
EF0	Trees, homes, and several outbuildings were damaged.						
EF4	Woodland Mills, TN to Mayfield, KY to W of McDaniels, KY	Obion (TN), Fulton (KY), Hickman (KY), Graves (KY), Marshall (KY), Lyon (KY), Caldwell (KY), Hopkins (KY), Muhlenberg (KY), Ohio (KY), Breckinridge (KY), Grayson (KY)	TN, KY	36.483°N 89.135°W	02:54–05:48	165.6 mi (266.5 km)	2,600 yd (2,400 m)
EF4	57 deaths – See article on this tornado – This was the ninth tornado, and second violent tornado produced by the Quad-State supercell. 515 people were injured.						
EF0	ENE of Fisher	Poinsett	AR	35.5093°N 90.8431°W	02:51–02:52 (1 minute)	0.08 mi (0.13 km)	20 yd (18 m)
EF0	An outbuilding was destroyed by this brief tornado.						
EF2	S of Sorento to NW of Cowden	Bond, Montgomery, Fayette, Shelby	IL	38.985°N 89.57°W	02:53–03:36	41.54 mi (66.85 km)	690 yd (630 m)
EF2	This long-tracked tornado destroyed outbuildings, snapped, twisted, or uprooted many trees, and downed many power poles as it passed near the towns of Panama, Coffeen, Fillmore, Bingham, Ramsey, and Herrick. The most significant damage occurred near Herrick, where an addition to a house suffered heavy damage, injuring one person.						
EF2	Trumann	Poinsett	AR	35.6654°N 90.5268°W	03:11–03:15	3.6 mi (5.8 km)	250 yd (230 m)
EF2	This strong tornado was spawned by an embedded supercell within a QLCS complex moving through central and eastern Arkansas. Numerous homes, mobile homes, and businesses were damaged or destroyed in Trumann, with the most intense damage in the northeastern part of the town. A small vacant grocery store building was completely destroyed. The Trumann fire department building had its roof torn off, and a nursing home was significantly damaged, though no injuries occurred there, as the building had been evacuated prior to the tornado. Many large trees were snapped or uprooted throughout the town and an RV camper was overturned.						
EF2	SSE of Windsor to NE of Mattoon	Shelby, Moultrie, Coles	IL	39.419°N 88.59°W	03:50–04:04	15.86 mi (25.52 km)	200 yd (180 m)
EF2	A small farm outbuilding was destroyed, and power poles were broken southeast of Windsor. The tornado struck and severely damaged an agricultural services plant west of Gays, damaging or destroying several buildings and flipping three tanker trucks. A barn was destroyed, and farming equipment was tossed. A house had its roof torn off, some other homes were damaged to a lesser degree, and two large metal storage buildings were severely damaged as well. Many trees and power lines were downed along the path.						
EF0	N of Cedar Lake	Lake	IN	41.4058°N 87.4543°W	04:05–04:10	4.8 mi (7.7 km)	100 yd (91 m)
EF0	A weak tornado caused scattered light to moderate roof damage. Numerous tree limbs were snapped, and several trees and a power pole were downed.						
EF2	NE of Ellington	Reynolds	MO	37.273°N 90.877°W	04:05–04:11	6.32 mi (10.17 km)	300 yd (270 m)
EF2	A strong tornado completely unroofed two homes and destroyed the exterior wall of a third. Other homes and a single-wide trailer were damaged. Two outbuildings were destroyed, while trees and power lines were downed.						
EF1	Southern Rardin to E of Oakland	Coles	IL	39.60°N 88.10°W	04:18–04:22	6.33 mi (10.19 km)	100 yd (91 m)
EF1	This tornado touched town at the south edge of Rardin and moved to the northeast. Several trees were downed along the path.						
EF3	Northeastern Newbern, TN to Dresden, TN to W of Elkton, KY	Dyer (TN), Gibson (TN), Obion (TN), Weakley (TN), Henry (TN), Calloway (KY), Stewart (TN), Christian (KY), Todd (KY)	TN, KY	36.12°N 89.26°W	04:32–06:36	122.91 mi (197.80 km)	2,000 yd (1,800 m)
EF3	See section on this tornado – 38 people were injured.						
EF2	N of Chrisman	Edgar, Vermilion	IL	39.8494°N 87.6693°W	04:41–04:44	3.65 mi (5.87 km)	200 yd (180 m)
EF2	At a farmstead, several grain bins were damaged, and a machine shed lost large sections of its roof, with metal roofing debris scattered up to 1.5 miles (2.4 km) away. Trees were uprooted, power poles were snapped, and a barn was destroyed as well.						

=== December 11 event ===
List of confirmed tornadoes – Saturday, December 11, 2021
EF#	Location	County / Parish	State	Start Coord.	Time (UTC)	Path length	Max width
EF1	SW of Emerald Mountain	Hardin	KY	37.7753°N 86.1383°W	06:06–06:08	1.9 mi (3.1 km)	50 yd (46 m)
EF1	The walls and roofs of farm buildings were damaged, trees were snapped or uprooted, and power lines were downed. This was the tenth tornado from the Quad-State supercell.						
EF0	NW of Somerville	Fayette	TN	35.308°N 89.463°W	06:40–06:41	0.53 mi (0.85 km)	50 yd (46 m)
EF0	A brief tornado was photographed; no damage occurred.						
EF3	W of Russellville to NW of Bowling Green	Logan, Warren	KY	36.8594°N 87.0315°W	06:47–07:14	28.02 mi (45.09 km)	1,400 yd (1,300 m)
EF3	This tornado began in western Logan County after the previous long-tracked EF3 tornado dissipated approximately 12 miles (19 km) west near Elkton. It quickly intensified after touching down, tearing off the roof of a house and destroying multiple well-built dairy barns, outbuildings, and a Quonset hut at a large dairy farm. Many trees were snapped, some of which were debarked, and a semi-trailer was thrown. To the northeast, a home lost much of its second story and a nearby well-built log cabin was heavily damaged and lost its roof. The tornado then destroyed a double-wide mobile home, injuring the occupant, along with several nearby outbuildings. The tornado crossed US 431 north of Russellville and continued northeast, completely destroying many mobile homes, barns, and outbuildings and collapsing an electrical transmission tower. Several frame homes were damaged to a lesser degree, though a well-built brick home lost its roof and had a carport destroyed as well. Continuing northeast along KY 79, the tornado caused considerable damage in Chandlers Chapel, where a Methodist church lost its steeple and had several broken stained-glass windows, a school building sustained roof and window damage, and homes sustained partial to total roof loss. Further northeast, a couple of long chicken barns were leveled and swept away. Many trees and power lines were downed, and more barns, outbuildings, and homes were damaged (some heavily) as the tornado moved into Warren County. The tornado's path ended just before reaching I-165.						
EF1	SE of Mount Washington	Spencer	KY	38.0035°N 85.4995°W	06:51–06:53	1.9 mi (3.1 km)	100 yd (91 m)
EF1	The tornado struck a farm, knocking over a few silos and collapsing a barn, damaging outbuildings and downing trees. This tornado was the eleventh and last produced by the long-tracked Quad-State supercell.						
EF3	SW of Bowling Green to S of Plum Springs to NNW of Rocky Hill	Warren, Edmonson	KY	36.916°N 86.618°W	07:09–07:38	29.26 mi (47.09 km)	440 yd (400 m)
EF3	16 deaths – See article on this tornado – 63 people were injured.						
EF2	Southeastern Bowling Green to SE of Plum Springs	Warren	KY	36.9559°N 86.4231°W	07:19–07:24	6.1 mi (9.8 km)	300 yd (270 m)
EF2	See article on this tornado						
EF1	ESE of Jackson to WSW of Lexington	Madison, Henderson	TN	35.61°N 88.67°W	07:32–07:40	7.86 mi (12.65 km)	300 yd (270 m)
EF1	One brick home sustained significant roof damage, while another had one of its garage walls blown out. A log cabin also had an exterior wall blown out, and a small and frail cottage was completely destroyed. An outbuilding and a shed were also destroyed, and another metal outbuilding was damaged. Trees were downed as well.						
EF2	WNW of Lexington to Natchez Trace State Park	Henderson	TN	35.68°N 88.48°W	07:40–07:58	15.34 mi (24.69 km)	600 yd (550 m)
EF2	This high-end EF2 tornado completely destroyed an outbuilding and multiple TVA transmission towers. A house sustained roof damage, a couple of metal buildings were heavily damaged or destroyed, and some metal power poles were bent. Numerous trees were snapped or uprooted, with minor debarking noted. One person was injured.						
EF2	SW of Park City to Cave City to NE of Horse Cave	Edmonson, Barren, Hart	KY	37.066°N 86.088°W	07:38–07:54	16.98 mi (27.33 km)	900 yd (820 m)
EF2	This tornado began in the southeast corner of Edmonson County after the Bowling Green EF3 tornado dissipated and moved northeast along I-65 into Barren County and Hart County, first passing directly through Park City, where many trees were snapped, barns and outbuildings were destroyed, and homes sustained roof damage. Past Park City, the tornado destroyed more barns, inflicted roof damage to additional homes, and heavily damaged a mobile home. The most severe damage occurred in Cave City, where hotels, motels, and restaurants in town suffered major roof loss or roof collapse, a trailer park was heavily damaged, and roads signs and metal light poles were knocked down. Homes and apartment buildings in Cave City sustained roof damage as well. In Horse Cave, the roofs of homes were damaged, and some older tobacco warehouses had their walls blown out and sustained roof damage. An office trailer in town also had its roof blown off. Many trees were downed along the path. The tornado dissipated as the parent storm merged with another storm producing a second EF2 tornado in Hart County as they passed south of Munfordville.						
EF2	SSW of Munfordville to Hardyville to NE of Summersville	Hart, Green	KY	37.222°N 85.927°W	07:55–08:17	23.82 mi (38.33 km)	528 yd (483 m)
EF2	Numerous homes, mobile homes, barns, and outbuildings were either damaged or destroyed, an Amish schoolhouse was destroyed, farm animals were killed, and many trees and power lines were downed along the beginning of this strong tornado’s. The tornado then passed through the north side of Hardyville, where several homes sustained major structural damage, garages and outbuildings were destroyed, and a truck was flipped. Past Hardyville, the tornado weakened and inflicted more minor damage to trees, roofs, and outbuildings in Summersville before the tornado dissipated. One person was injured.						
EF1	SSW of Holladay to SE of Sugar Tree	Decatur, Benton	TN	35.819°N 88.028°W	08:00–08:08	9.07 mi (14.60 km)	100 yd (91 m)
EF1	Several trees were snapped, one of which fell on and destroyed half of a mobile home. Debris from that structure was scattered into a nearby field.						
EF1	S of Ada	Hardin	OH	40.7305°N 83.8264°W	08:06–08:10	1.6 mi (2.6 km)	150 yd (140 m)
EF1	A business, a home, and nearby outbuildings sustained extensive damage. Debris from the outbuildings was blown 0.7 miles (1.1 km) away. Multiple trees were snapped.						
EF2	WNW of Lobelville to NW of Bucksnort	Perry, Humphreys, Hickman	TN	35.7916°N 87.8868°W	08:15–08:41	15.16 mi (24.40 km)	600 yd (550 m)
EF2	This strong EF2 tornado snapped and uprooted thousands of trees in a convergent pattern. An RV was overturned and had its roof torn off. Its rating was upgraded to EF2 in March 2023 after the delayed evaluation of extreme tree damage south of I-40.						
EF3	W of Saloma to W of Bradfordsville	Taylor, Marion	KY	37.408°N 85.427°W	08:20–08:36	14.54 mi (23.40 km)	450 yd (410 m)
EF3	1 death – See section on this tornado – 36 people were injured.						
EF1	NNW of Centerville	Hickman	TN	35.9246°N 87.6214°W	08:32–08:39	8.54 mi (13.74 km)	400 yd (370 m)
EF1	Numerous trees were downed as the tornado crossed I-40. This tornado was originally rated EF0, but was upgraded to EF1 in March 2023 due to extensive tree damage in rural areas.						
EF1	SW of Gravel Switch	Marion	KY	37.5282°N 85.1083°W	08:41–08:43	1.9 mi (3.1 km)	50 yd (46 m)
EF1	This tornado formed after the EF3 Saloma tornado dissipated. One small farm building was destroyed, another sustained roof damage, and trees were downed.						
EF2	SSW of Dickson to NE of Burns	Hickman, Dickson	TN	35.9759°N 87.4761°W	08:40–08:51	10.87 mi (17.49 km)	500 yd (460 m)
EF2	A strong tornado severely damaged the roofs and exterior walls of several homes, shifting some off of their foundations. Less intense damage to trees and power poles occurred in and around Burns before tornado dissipated. Two people were injured.						
EF0	S of Burns to S of White Bluff	Dickson	TN	36.0255°N 87.3054°W	08:49–08:54	5.41 mi (8.71 km)	175 yd (160 m)
EF0	Several trees were downed and tree branches were broken off.						
EF2	E of White Bluff to NE of Pegram	Dickson, Cheatham, Davidson	TN	36.1065°N 87.1941°W	08:57–09:11	12.61 mi (20.29 km)	400 yd (370 m)
EF2	Several homes and businesses were significantly damaged along US 70 near Kingston Springs, including a few houses that sustained partial to total roof loss. Barns and outbuildings were destroyed, and trees and power poles were snapped. One person was injured.						
EF2	Eastern Junction City	Boyle	KY	37.5792°N 84.7761°W	09:01–09:02	0.63 mi (1.01 km)	100 yd (91 m)
EF2	A brief but strong tornado struck the Boyle County Airport on the east side of Junction City. Three hangars were destroyed and several aircraft were mangled. Elsewhere, several homes sustained roof damage, one home had its roof completely destroyed, and a barn was severely damaged.						
EF1	Danville	Boyle	KY	37.6459°N 84.7908°W	09:02–09:05	3.63 mi (5.84 km)	400 yd (370 m)
EF1	This tornado moved directly through Danville, where a church, a gas station, and some other businesses sustained significant roof damage, several homes sustained roof and fascia damage, and numerous trees were downed. A barn was destroyed outside of town before the tornado dissipated.						
EF1	SE of Danville to NW of Lancaster	Boyle, Lincoln, Garrard	KY	37.603°N 84.726°W	09:04–09:11	7.08 mi (11.39 km)	100 yd (91 m)
EF1	Near the community of Hedgeville, several site-built homes, manufactured homes, and barns sustained varying degrees of roof damage, and several trees were downed. One old barn was destroyed and debris was thrown onto US 27.						
EF1	SW of Bryantsville	Boyle, Garrard	KY	37.678°N 84.694°W	09:07–09:11	2.99 mi (4.81 km)	950 yd (870 m)
EF1	Numerous trees were downed, tree branches were broken, and a few roofs were damaged.						
EF1	NW of Lancaster	Garrard	KY	37.6679°N 84.6279°W	09:10–09:11	0.6 mi (0.97 km)	100 yd (91 m)
EF1	This brief tornado occurred just southeast of the path of the 09:04 UTC tornado that ended northwest of Lancaster. Two barns sustained major roof damage, a third barn was damaged, and several trees were downed.						
EF0	NE of Pegram to NNW of Downtown Nashville	Davidson	TN	36.1819°N 86.9594°W	09:12–09:21	9 mi (14 km)	300 yd (270 m)
EF0	The tornado formed just east of where the Kingston Springs EF2 dissipated. Numerous trees were blown down as the tornado crossed the Cumberland River three times, passing just north of John C. Tune Airport and through the Bordeaux neighborhood before dissipating along Whites Creek Pike (US 431). A nursery, the roof of a church, and the roofs of many homes were damaged along the path.						
EF1	NNW of Round Hill	Madison	KY	37.687°N 84.4196°W	09:22	0.25 mi (0.40 km)	75 yd (69 m)
EF1	A barn was damaged and trees were downed.						
EF1	NNW of Richmond	Madison	KY	37.8244°N 84.3301°W	09:31–09:32	1.2 mi (1.9 km)	125 yd (114 m)
EF1	A house and a tobacco barn sustained major roof damage, a second house sustained minor roof and gutter damage, and several trees were downed.						
EF1	Old Hickory to E of Hendersonville	Davidson, Sumner, Wilson	TN	36.2635°N 86.6578°W	09:30–09:37	6.82 mi (10.98 km)	150 yd (140 m)
EF1	Several homes sustained roof damage and trees were downed in Old Hickory before the tornado crossed Old Hickory Lake into Sumner County, downing numerous trees and power lines and causing roof damage to more homes. It crossed the lake again into Wilson County, downing more trees and power lines before dissipating.						
EF1	S of Hermitage to Mount Juliet	Davidson, Wilson	TN	36.1424°N 86.5901°W	09:31–09:39	7.67 mi (12.34 km)	100 yd (91 m)
EF1	This tornado moved from near Percy Priest Lake into Mount Juliet, impacting multiple subdivisions. Many homes sustained mostly minor roof and siding damage, although some homes suffered more moderate damage. One house had its east wall and garage blown out. Mount Juliet Elementary School sustained minor roof damage, and many trees were downed along the path as well.						
EF0	Hermitage	Davidson	TN	36.1634°N 86.6223°W	09:33–09:35	1.38 mi (2.22 km)	50 yd (46 m)
EF0	A tornado moved from near I-40 at J. Percy Priest Dam to near SR 45 (Old Hickory Boulevard), crossing through numerous subdivisions. Many homes sustained roof and siding damage, multiple apartment buildings sustained minor damage, and the roof of a medical building was damaged. Many trees were downed along the path as well.						
EF0	N of Gallatin to SW of Bethpage	Sumner	TN	36.4430°N 86.4358°W	09:42–09:48	6.21 mi (9.99 km)	50 yd (46 m)
EF0	An outbuilding was destroyed, a home sustained roof damage, and several trees were downed.						
EF0	N of Lebanon	Wilson, Sumner	TN	36.3099°N 86.3301°W	09:48–09:51	3.07 mi (4.94 km)	50 yd (46 m)
EF0	Several trees were downed along a path that crossed the Cumberland River twice.						
EF0	South Carthage to NW of Granville	Smith, Jackson	TN	36.2416°N 85.9548°W	10:04–10:11	7.35 mi (11.83 km)	75 yd (69 m)
EF0	This tornado started in South Carthage, causing minor roof damage, and crossed the Cumberland River into Carthage. It moved through the east side of Carthage before crossing the Cumberland River four more times. One structure sustained moderate roof damage, other buildings had minor damage, and numerous trees and tree limbs were downed.						
EF1	Hermitage Springs, TN to E of Hestand, KY	Clay (TN), Monroe (KY)	TN, KY	36.5809°N 85.7738°W	10:20–10:30	11.18 mi (17.99 km)	75 yd (69 m)
EF1	Four large agricultural buildings were destroyed in Clay County, several homes sustained roof damage, a barn was damaged near Hestand, and numerous trees were downed.						
EF1	N of Marietta	Prentiss	MS	34.5365°N 88.4622°W	10:30–10:35	4.5 mi (7.2 km)	100 yd (91 m)
EF1	A site-built home had a large part of its roof ripped off and its carport was destroyed. Two mobile homes had sections of their roofs peeled back. Numerous trees were snapped or uprooted along the path.						
EF0	S of Elkton	Giles	TN	35.0314°N 86.9644°W	12:17–12:22	4.99 mi (8.03 km)	50 yd (46 m)
EF0	A shed had its roof blown off, a house lost roof shingles, a few trees were downed, and a semi-truck was blown off I-65.						
EF1	Coalmont to N of Palmer	Grundy	TN	35.3472°N 85.712°W	13:39–13:48	8.92 mi (14.36 km)	100 yd (91 m)
EF1	The walls of a metal building were blown out and numerous trees were downed.						
EF0	S of Irwinton	Wilkinson	GA	32.73°N 83.21°W	22:16–22:23	3.8 mi (6.1 km)	200 yd (180 m)
EF0	A brief tornado downed some trees.						

== See also ==
- Weather of 2021
- List of North American tornadoes and tornado outbreaks
- List of F4 and EF4 tornadoes
  - List of F4 and EF4 tornadoes (2020–present)
- Tornadoes of 2021
- List of United States tornadoes from October to December 2021
