= Mayfield Ten =

The Mayfield Ten were ten African-American students in Graves County, Kentucky who chose to integrate the white high school in Mayfield, Kentucky in 1956.

Graves County, Kentucky

Established in 1908, Mayfield High School was the white high school of Mayfield. Ten students from Dunbar ("Colored") High School chose to integrate into Mayfield High School.

== Dunbar High School ==
At the height of the Jim Crow era in the 1890s, Mayfield had witnessed terrible violence based on race. Since 1900 there were twenty schools in Graves County dedicated to serve black students, though few graduated from high school. The "Dunbar Colored School" (offering primary grades only) had started first in a private building on Water Street, and in 1908 had joined with the city schools in order to receive state funding. Dunbar High School started in 1921 in a new building built from contributions from the Rosenwald Fund – the primary classes held on the first floor and the secondary classes on the second. Many Rosenwald schools in western Kentucky were poorly maintained and supplies were meager. The federal court order in May 1954 forced schools in western Kentucky to integrate, and state officials worked to comply, though many local administrators refused. The Superintendent of Mayfield Schools at that time is not known, but the principal of Mayfield High School was Paul Craig (who replaced Florence Wyman in 1954) and the principal of Dunbar School was Fred Stiger.

== Experiment in integration (1956) ==
According to Alice Monyette Wilson in her televised oral history, a group of ninth graders decided to integrate the school on their own.

And the more we talked about it the more serious it became. We decided maybe we should try. And we did. And the day that we walked into the building, was a real shock, because nobody expected it. There was no advance notice of this. So the ten of us walked into the main office, because there was—there was a kind of registration, if I remember correctly, in August. And we found out when that registration date was, and we went to the high school to register. We walked into many shocked faces, and announced that we were there to register to attend Mayfield High School.

These ten students entered into a tense but mostly peaceful situation at Mayfield High School in the fall of 1956. Looking back on those days, Alice Wilson remembered:

They were absolutely shocked that we had walked in, and we did register; and I'm sure the telephones were ringing off the hook for that one. Because, of course, it involved the teachers there, it involved, I'm sure, City Council, how they were gonna handle this situation. I'm sure it threw everybody into turmoil, but it wasn't blocked. It was not blocked by those, the City Council, and those who were making decisions at the time.

This was not the usual case – many other integration procedures did not go this smoothly. The integration of the white high school in nearby Sturgis, Kentucky, garnered international attention due to the white supremacist resistance. Alice Wilson described going in to register for admission to the all-white high school: "I don't remember being afraid in the office. We weren't made to feel that way. But the atmosphere was that no one really knew what to do. Whether they should go ahead and register us, or wait until there was some decision, perhaps from the Board at that time. They didn't really know what to do. But we registered, and then the whole process began." The integration was optional, and for the first time, the students had the option to choose between Dunbar "Colored" High School and Mayfield High School. Following the Brown v. Board of Education decision, the Mayfield Ten chose to go to Mayfield High School to expand their opportunities, gain access to better materials, and to broaden their educations. They knew they were getting a better education at the all-white school, even though it was difficult on a day-to-day basis. Only two of the Mayfield Ten graduated on time – the others "had to repeat a grade, or they failed, or they didn't catch up quite as quickly, or whatever."

The only overt opposition faced by the Mayfield Ten was when the white students would refuse to attend classes and conduct a sit-in protest. As Alice Wilson remembers, "all the students would come out on the campus and just stand there" in protest of the ten black students attending class – Wilson remembered this happening "off and on for quite awhile [sic?] ... at least a year and a half of that time." She remembered the local police would ride around the school in the mornings; and, that the students had family friends who would drive them there some days "if they heard anything on the radio, or they suspected anything was going on they would come and pick us up." One day, Wilson remembered a large crowd had gathered outside the building to protest the Black students attending. The Mayfield Ten walked right through the crowd that was yelling obscenities at them and were taken into the building by their principal. Wilson recounts that the principal's way of handling the white supremacist protesters was "to just go in, and let them know that nothing was going to stop because of what they were saying, and they had a choice to stand out there all day, or come to class. ... I think he was trying to keep it as quiet as possible without anybody getting hurt." Alice Wilson recounts the day as a disappointment to the protesters, because no one paid them much mind. Quite a few state trooper cars lined the road, but no cameras were there and no news crews. The school day simply continued without them, and eventually they chose to give up and enter the building. Alice Wilson says this kind of incident was never repeated.

== Impact ==
By attending Mayfield High School, the Mayfield Ten opened up for themselves a wealth of opportunities that were unavailable to black students in Graves County. While this integration in 1956 was only partial, the Ten braved the possibility of persecution and hate crimes to broaden their education. Dunbar High School closed in 1966 and to outsiders, the white school, Mayfield High School was integrated – but on closer inspection, few blacks were given equal access to public education in the strongly segregationist culture of the time. In 1966, the Kentucky Civil Rights Act was the first of its kind in the south, and the only member of the Senate who voted against it was from Graves County.

== See also ==
- Graves County, Kentucky
- Mayfield, Kentucky
- Clinton High School (Clinton, Tennessee)
- Little Rock Nine
- NAACP in Kentucky
