= 2021 Western Kentucky tornado =

Deadly EF4 tornado in Kentucky, United States

Coordinates: 36°44′29″N 88°38′6″W

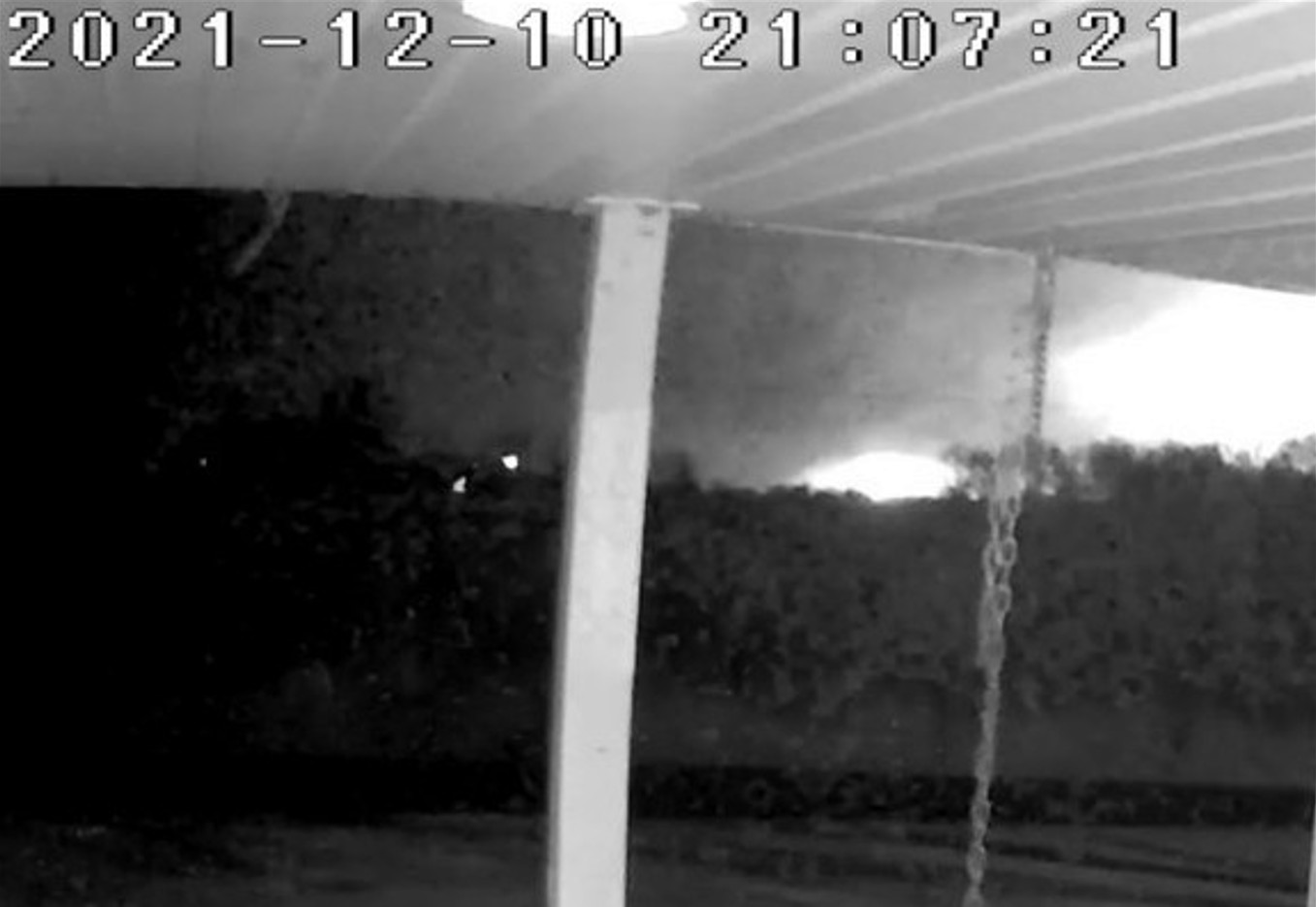
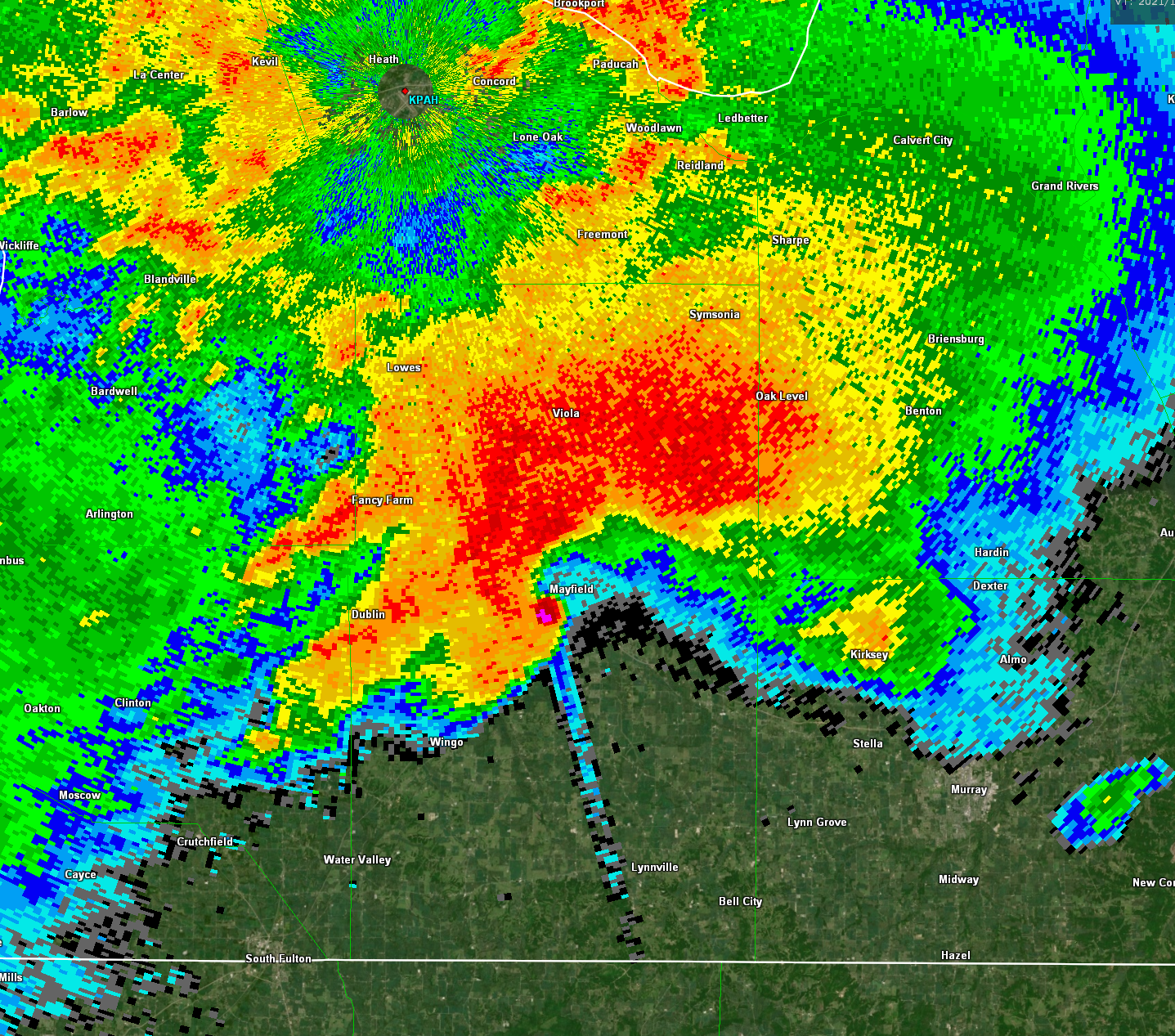
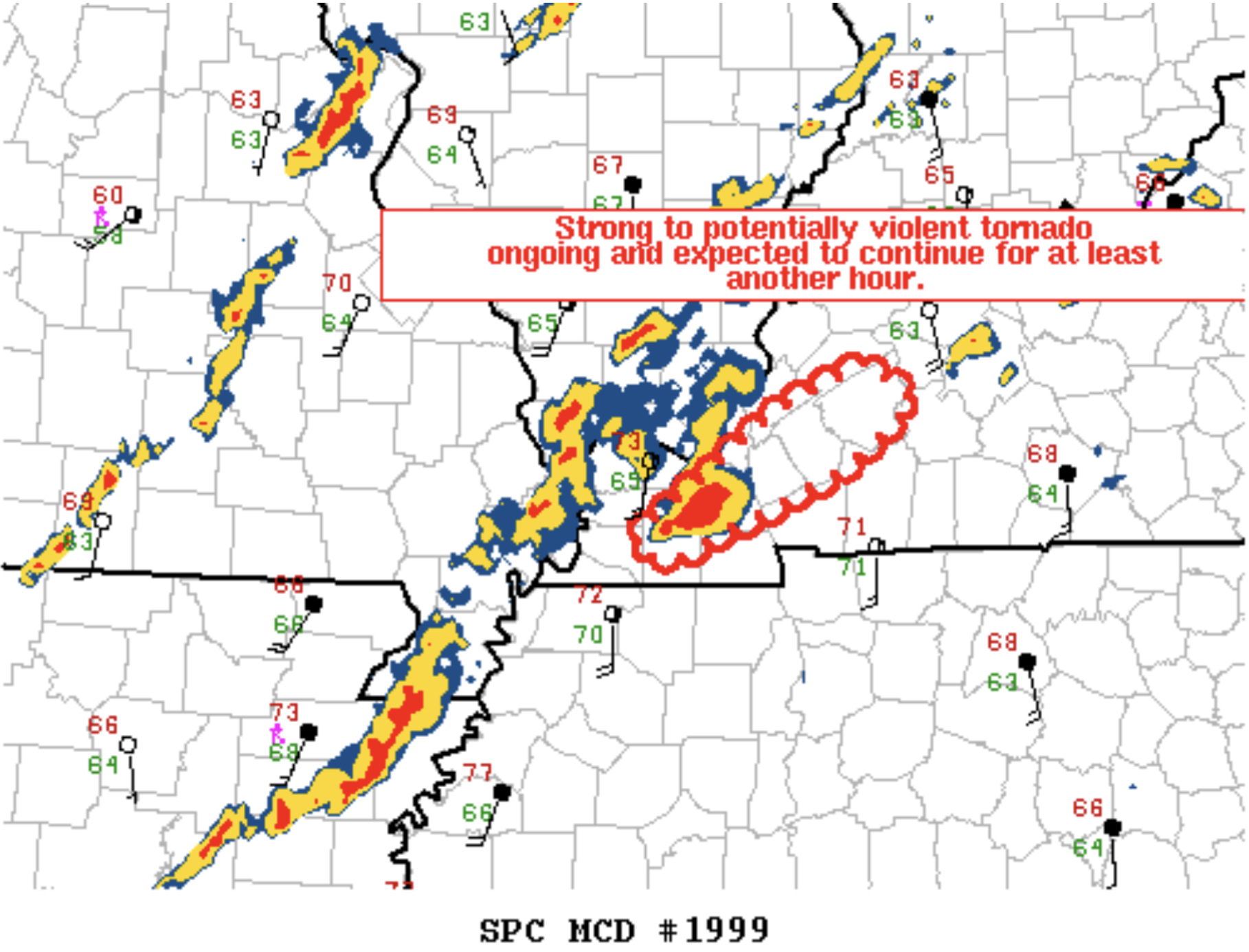
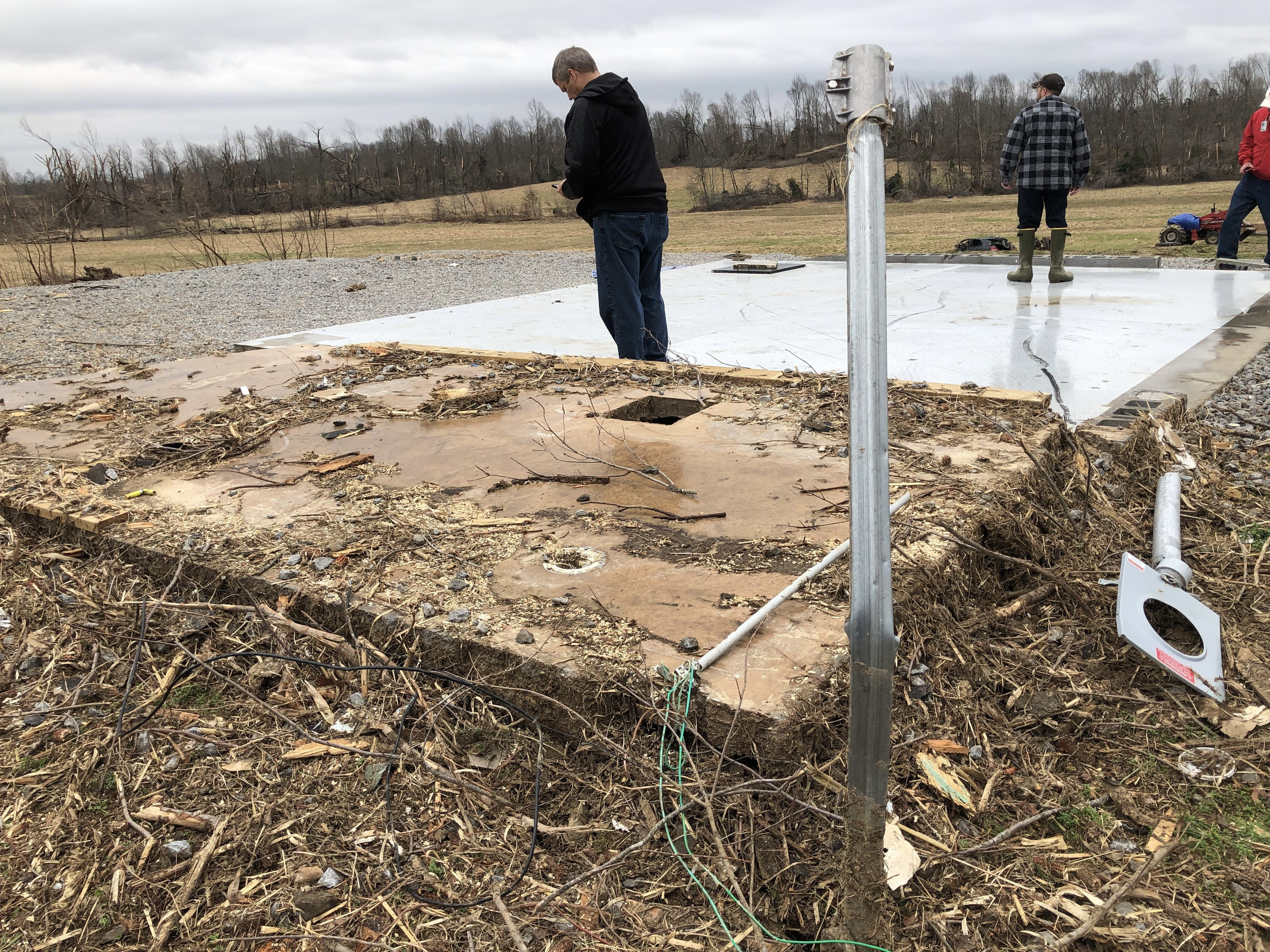
- Clockwise from top: A CCTV still of the tornado seen near Cayce, Kentucky from Obion County, Tennessee; a Storm Prediction Center mesoscale discussion of the tornado as it was ongoing; high-end EF4 damage to a home along Strader Lane in Bremen; a radar scan of the supercell showing the tornado as it struck Mayfield

Meteorological history
- Formed: December 10, 2021, 8:54 p.m. CST (UTC−06:00)
- Dissipated: December 10, 2021, 11:48 p.m. CST (UTC−06:00)
- Duration: 2 hours, 54 minutes

EF4 tornado
- on the Enhanced Fujita scale
- Max width: 2,600 yd (1.5 mi; 2.4 km)
- Path length: 165.6 mi (266.5 km)
- Highest winds: 190 mph (310 km/h)

Overall effects
- Fatalities: 57 (+1 indirect)
- Injuries: 519
- Damage: $507 million (2021 USD)
- Areas affected: Obion County, Tennessee and Western Kentucky, United States
- Part of the tornado outbreak of December 10–11, 2021 and tornado outbreaks of 2021

During the late evening hours of December 10, 2021, a massive, long lived and devastating high-end EF4 tornado, sometimes referred to as the Western Kentucky tornado, Mayfield tornado, or The Beast, tracked a significant distance across Western Kentucky, United States, producing severe-to-catastrophic damage in numerous towns, including Mayfield, Princeton, Dawson Springs, and Bremen. This tornado was the second significant tornado in an exceedingly long-tracked tornado family; it began just inside northern Obion County, Tennessee – a few miles after another long-tracked tornado that traveled through northeast Arkansas, the Missouri Bootheel, and northwest Tennessee – and dissipated in western Obion County. After crossing into Kentucky, the tornado moved through eleven counties of the Jackson Purchase and Western Coal Field regions, at times becoming wrapped in rain during its almost three-hour lifespan that covered 165.6 miles (266.5 km). It was the deadliest and longest-tracked tornado in the outbreak that produced numerous, strong tornadoes in several states; this tornado caused 57 deaths. It became the first violent tornado to strike the state of Kentucky since a deadly 2012 EF4 tornado that occurred over 9 years prior. The tornado is estimated to have caused at least $507 million in damages.

Early estimates suggested the tornado family, which some media outlets described as a "Quad-State tornado" due to the storm's long track and similarity to the 219-mile (352 km) Tri-State tornado of 1925, might have traveled 250 miles (400 km) on the ground, making it the longest-tracked tornado in history. Storm surveys found the majority of the storm's path consisted of two separate EF4 tornadoes, and three weaker, short-lived tornadoes in between them in northwestern Obion County, Tennessee. The parent supercell that produced the two EF4 tornadoes, and eleven tornadoes in total, later became known as the Quad-State supercell.

After the tornado, a state of emergency and a federal disaster were declared by Governor Andy Beshear and President Joe Biden on December 11. The death toll of 57 was the highest from a tornado in the month of December in U.S. history, while also being the deadliest tornado since 2011. Some of the worst damage occurred in Mayfield and was considered by some National Weather Service (NWS) analysts in a case study as bordering on EF5 intensity, prompting discussion on the intensity of high-end tornadoes and damage requirements.

Multiple workers at the Mayfield Consumer Products candle factory that was destroyed with multiple casualties alleged that supervisors told them they would be fired if they left their shifts early ahead of the storm's direct hit on the city. Company spokespeople have denied the allegations. On December 17, it was reported that multiple workers (only one was named due to fear of reprisal) filed a class-action lawsuit against the company. The lawsuit alleged that the company had up to three and a half hours to allow employees to leave before the tornado hit the factory and showed a flagrant indifference to the rights of the workers.

== Meteorological synopsis ==
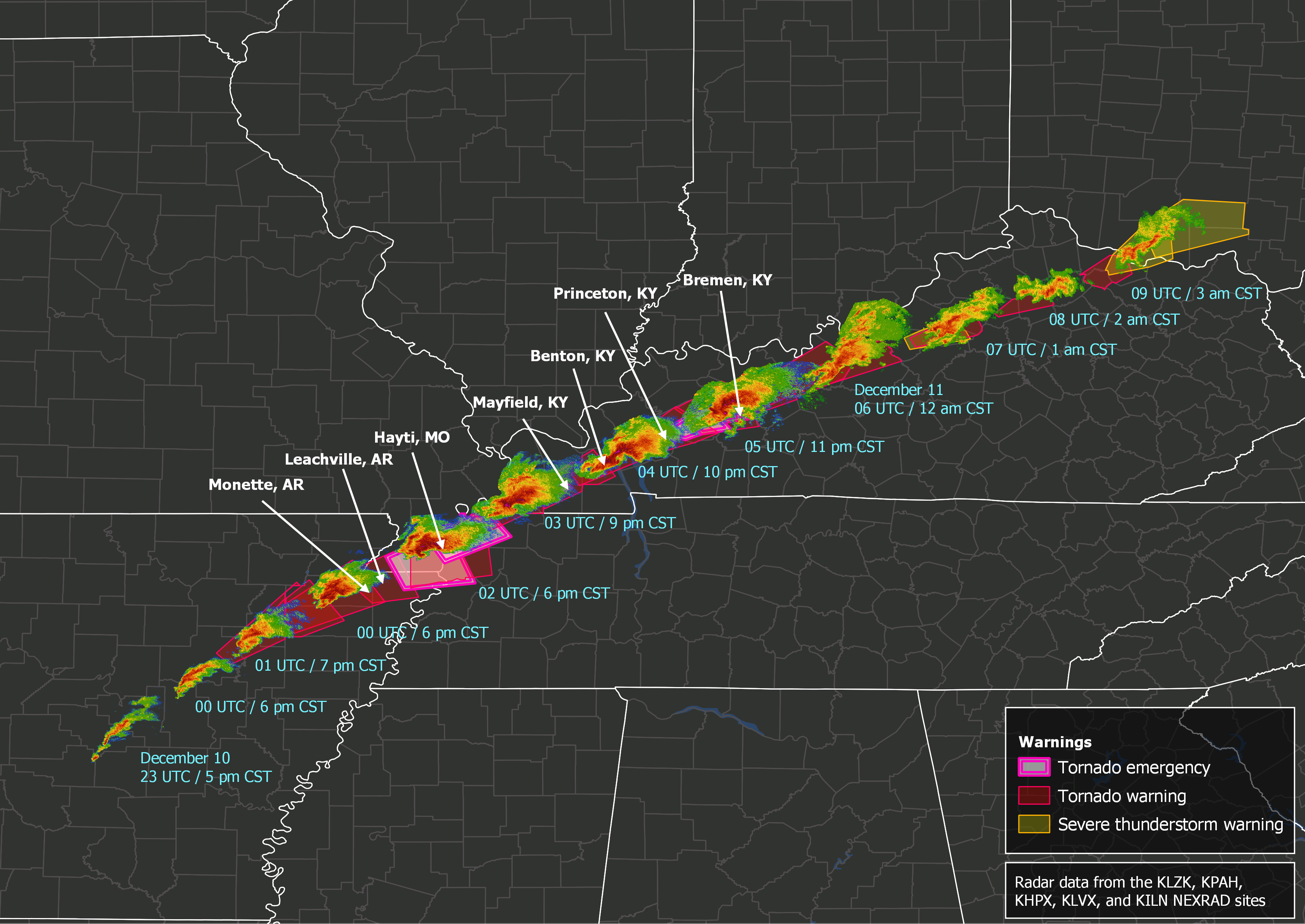
Radar collage of a supercell that spawned a tornado family during the outbreak

On December 8, 2021, the NWS Storm Prediction Center (SPC) outlined a slight risk of severe weather across a broad area of the Mississippi Valley. Despite the potential for a higher-end severe threat to materialize, forecasters were uncertain about the extent of instability, degree of directional wind shear, and the timing of potential storms. The following day, the SPC noted an increased potential for organized severe thunderstorms in the region between southeastern Arkansas and southern Indiana, and upgraded that area to an enhanced risk.

As an intense, upper-level trough progressed across the High Plains, with robust instability and moisture return across the Mississippi Valley, the SPC expanded the enhanced risk and introduced a moderate risk area from northeastern Arkansas into southern Illinois on the morning of December 10. Forecasters indicated atmospheric conditions favored the development of nocturnal supercells capable of producing long-tracked, strong tornadoes.

At 3:00 p.m. CST (21:00 UTC), the SPC issued a tornado watch across the highest-risk area: central and eastern Arkansas, west Tennessee, northwestern Mississippi, southeastern Missouri, and southern portions of Illinois and Indiana; it was the first of eleven such warnings issued over the next few hours for the middle Mississippi Valley. Initial storms developed across central Arkansas around 2:00 p.m. CST (20:00 UTC), and weaker activity developed over central Missouri around 90 minutes later. Additional clusters of thunderstorms developed over southwestern Missouri – forming between Bolivar and Carthage, eventually back-building into northeastern Oklahoma – and central Arkansas, forming southwest of Hot Springs, between 5:00 and 5:30 p.m. CST (23:00–23:30 UTC). Though this activity lacked much vigor at its onset due to a strong capping inversion, the convective cells began to show organization as they progressed eastward.

One storm that formed from the initial mid-afternoon activity near Arkadelphia, Arkansas, matured into a long-lived supercell as it progressed in an unstable, deeply moist, and highly sheared environment. This cell persisted for more than 550 miles (890 km) over several hours from eastern Arkansas to northeastern Kentucky, producing eleven tornadoes, two of which were large and intense. The cell started showing signs of surface-based rotation southwest of Searcy, Arkansas, around 5:30 p.m. CST (23:30 UTC). At 5:51 p.m. CST, the National Weather Service office in North Little Rock issued the first tornado warning associated with the storm for portions of Jackson, Lawrence, White, and Woodruff counties. One of the first tornadoes associated with the storm, an EF0, touched down in western Poinsett County near Weiner around 6:40 p.m. CST; about fifteen minutes later, storm spotters reported a large tornado near Greenfield, prompting a particularly dangerous situation (PDS) tornado warning for portions of Poinsett, Craighead, and Mississippi counties, including areas to the south of Jonesboro.

Doppler radar analysis estimated the supercell maintained a nearly continuous, high-end rotational vorticity signature, averaging 94 mph (151 km/h; 82 kn) for approximately four hours and twenty minutes, a rarity among thunderstorms that produce mesocyclonic vorticity (averaging 1.5% of all supercells). The only velocities below the average recorded along the storm track were observed between 8:44 and 9:01 p.m. CST [02:44–3:01 UTC] as the storm crossed from Obion County, Tennessee, into Hickman County, Kentucky. This time frame coincides with the start of the Western Kentucky tornado, implying the supercell underwent a mesocyclone re-strengthening phase during this period. During this intense tornado's lifetime, peak gate-to-gate velocities of 128 mph (206 km/h; 111 kn) were recorded at 9:58 p.m. CST (04:58 UTC) over northeastern Marshall County, Kentucky.

Elsewhere, multiple lines of intense storms, some with embedded supercells, developed across the Mississippi Valley region through the night, and generated other strong, long-lived tornadoes. By the pre-dawn hours of December 11, a decrease in instability led to a gradual weakening of a line of thunderstorms along the associated cold front from eastern Kentucky southward into central Alabama.

The SPC issued a record-setting 43 mesoscale discussions (MCDs) between 12:00 p.m. UTC December 10 and 12:00 p.m. UTC December 11, all of which were associated with the broader storm system. Thirty-eight of these were convective discussions relating to severe thunderstorm activity, and five were non-convective discussions relating to heavy snow associated with the system that concurrently fell across much of the Upper Midwest. Through the night, the National Weather Service (NWS) issued 149 tornado warnings across Arkansas, Tennessee, Missouri, Mississippi, Kentucky, Illinois, and Indiana. These included multiple PDS tornado warnings and tornado emergencies in Arkansas, Tennessee, Kentucky, and Missouri. Eight of the tornado warnings issued by the NWS offices in Memphis, Tennessee, and Paducah, Kentucky, during the event were tornado emergencies, the most ever issued during the month of December, breaking the previous record of three issued on December 23, 2015.

== Tornado summary ==
=== Formation and rapid strengthening ===
The tornado touched down in Woodland Mills in Obion County, Tennessee, along Woodland Mills Road at 8:54 p.m. CST (02:54 UTC). It was produced by the same supercell that had produced another violent long-tracked tornado that affected northeast Arkansas, the Missouri Bootheel, and northwest Tennessee. After the dissipation of that tornado in Obion County northeast of Samburg, the supercell produced three weak, brief tornadoes before the Western Kentucky tornado formed several miles to the northeast. The tornado initially moved through the north side of Woodland Mills, causing minor damage to roofs and trees, before crossing SR 5. After moving northeast for one-half mile (0.80 km), rated EF0, it crossed the Tennessee–Kentucky state line near the community of State Line in Fulton County, causing additional tree damage. The total damage caused in Tennessee by the tornado was estimated at $25,000 (2021 USD).

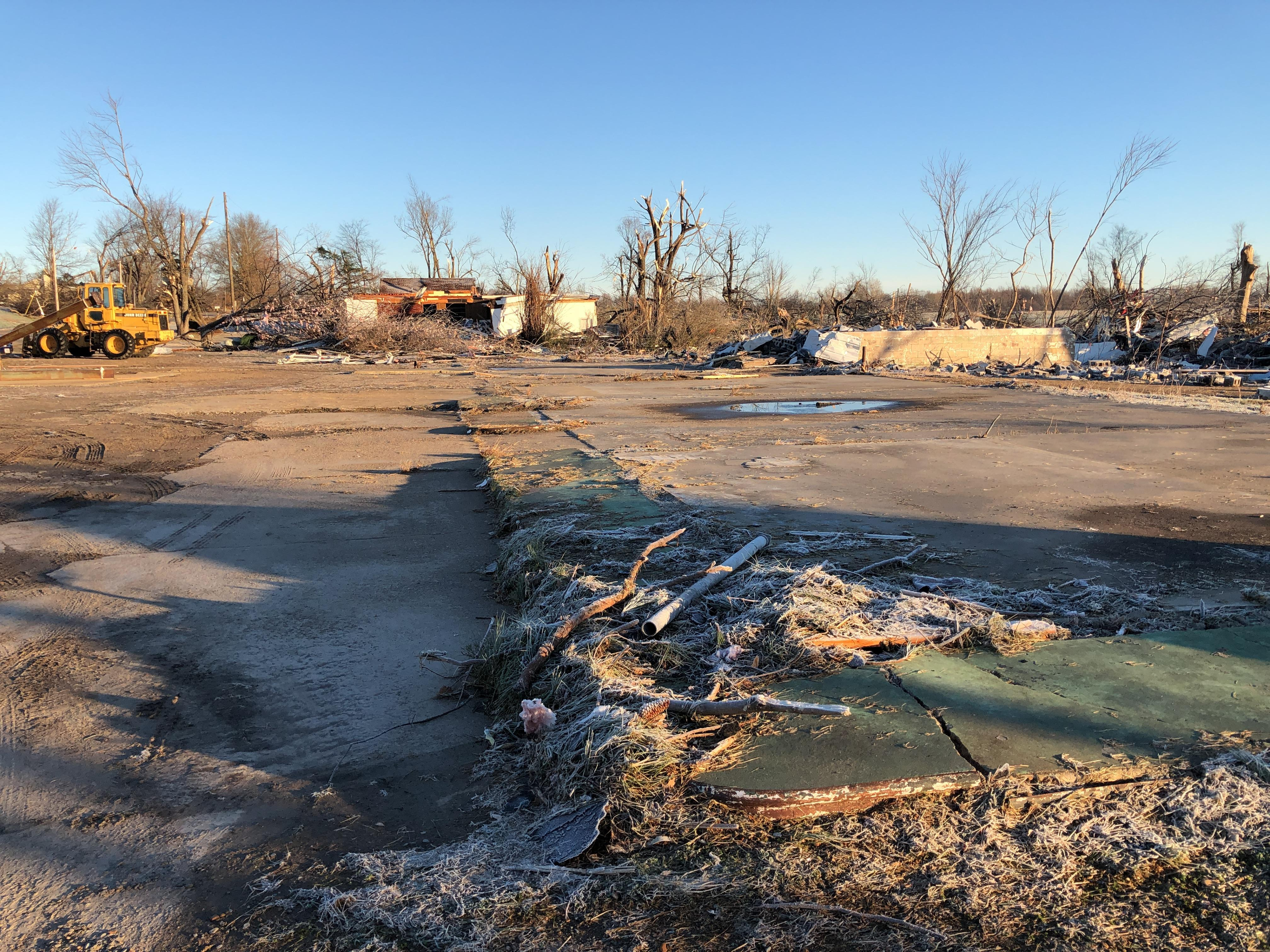
Low-end EF4 damage to a business in downtown Cayce

Farther to the northeast, the tornado reached EF2 strength, tearing roofs off homes, damaging or destroying outbuildings, damaging irrigation equipment, and ripping apart trailer homes. Soon after, the tornado became violent and directly impacted the small community of Cayce at low-end EF4 intensity, where homes and small businesses were damaged or destroyed, some of which were leveled or swept from their foundations. A music venue in a former school building was badly damaged, and the Cayce Volunteer Fire Department building was destroyed; the metal beams of the structure were severely twisted as pieces of heavy machinery were tossed around. Several outbuildings and mobile homes were also destroyed. One person died in Cayce and several others were injured.

After moving to the northeast of Cayce, the tornado weakened but remained strong as it moved at EF3 intensity through rural areas to the northeast of the town, destroying barns and a cell tower, and tearing the roof and exterior walls from a house. The tornado moved into Hickman County and appeared to dramatically intensify as it crossed US 51, where extreme ground scouring occurred in nearby fields. The tornado scoured trenches into the ground, removing all grass and several inches of topsoil in the worst-affected areas. No structures were impacted near US 51 and no rating was applied to the scouring. EF3 damage continued past this point as homes and metal truss towers were destroyed. EF2 damage was noted as it tracked into Graves County, closely paralleling Purchase Parkway and US 45, and moving directly toward the city of Mayfield. The roof of a house along KY 339 was torn off, and many trees and power poles were downed in this area.

=== Mayfield ===
Search and rescue teams combing through the wreckage of the Mayfield Consumer Products candle factory in Mayfield on December 13

The National Weather Service issued a tornado emergency for Mayfield at 9:26 p.m. CST (03:26 UTC) as the now massive wedge tornado approached the town from the southwest. As the tornado entered Mayfield, it regained EF4 intensity, and numerous homes along Cardinal Road were damaged or destroyed; some houses were leveled or swept from their foundations. Trees in the area were debarked and denuded, cars were thrown, and mobile homes were destroyed. EF4 damage continued after the tornado crossed over Mayfield Bypass (US 45 Bypass/I-69), where Mayfield Consumer Products, a candle factory where approximately 110 employees were working, was flattened. The large, metal-framed warehouse building collapsed, trapping employees, and resulting in eight deaths and numerous injuries. Allegedly, workers' jobs had been threatened by supervisors if they left the factory between the first and second tornado warnings for the area – a tornado warning had been issued at approximately 5:30 p.m. CST that evening – and again after the second tornado warning was issued after 9:00 p.m. CST. Several nearby industrial businesses were also damaged or destroyed, while semi-trucks and other industrial vehicles were thrown and destroyed, some being left unrecognizable.

CCTV footage of the tornado striking a bank in downtown Mayfield at EF4 intensity

After briefly weakening to EF3 intensity, the tornado again intensified, reaching just below high-end EF4 intensity as it moved along US 45 and tore through the center of Mayfield, resulting in widespread, catastrophic damage throughout the historic downtown square that was listed on the National Register of Historic Places for its late-Victorian and Classical Revival architecture. Most of the structures in downtown Mayfield were heavily damaged or destroyed, including large, well-built, multi-story, brick buildings that collapsed. Only large piles of bricks and lumber remained in the hardest-hit portions of the downtown area, and streets were left buried under debris. The large, well-constructed Graves County Courthouse had much of its roof torn off, its clock tower collapsed, and some of its exterior upper-floor walls were demolished. Several restaurants, an indoor soccer facility, a barber shop, automotive business, a gym, a bank, a movie theater, a health-and-rehab center, and many other businesses in downtown Mayfield were destroyed. Large metal silos were crumpled and heavily damaged at a granary, and the large Mayfield water tower was toppled and destroyed. The post office, city hall, fire station, and police station were significantly damaged or destroyed, and the emergency operations center lost the ability to transmit radio communications.

Three large churches were destroyed in downtown Mayfield, including the First Presbyterian Church: a large, well-built brick structure that was mostly leveled. The domed roof and upper walls of the First Christian Church collapsed, as did the sanctuary of the First United Methodist Church, which was constructed with very thick, masonry, exterior walls. A school bus garage, metal industrial buildings, and apartment buildings in other parts of the town were damaged or destroyed. The tornado also devastated residential areas of the town, levelling or sweeping numerous homes from their foundations. Many trees were denuded and debarked, and cars were thrown hundreds of yards and mangled. Dual polarization radar imagery showed the tornado had lofted debris up to 30,000 feet (9,100 m) as it impacted the city. Twenty-two people were killed in and around Mayfield, and hundreds more were injured, many severely. The tornado's winds peaked at 188 mph (303 km/h) in the city.

=== Marshall, Lyon, and Caldwell counties ===
After leaving Mayfield, the tornado weakened, producing damage at EF2 to EF3 strength, and continued northeast along I-69 and KY 58. A hangar and some small airplanes were destroyed at Mayfield Graves County Airport, and homes, a nearby church, and a business were damaged. Further weakening occurred as the tornado continued moving northeast, and EF0 to EF1 damage to trees and structures occurred. It intensified again as it approached and crossed the Marshall County line along I-69 before moving through the northwestern and northern outskirts of Benton, damaging or destroying homes, garages, and outbuildings; downing trees and power lines; and flipping RV campers. Most of the damage through this section of Marshall County ranged in intensity from EF2 to EF3, though a few homes to the southwest of Benton were leveled or swept from their foundations at high-end EF3 strength. The tornado then moved into Briensburg at EF2 intensity; houses near and along US 68 sustained partial-to-total roof loss, outbuildings were damaged or destroyed, and a metal truss transmission tower collapsed. Past Briensburg, EF3 damage occurred along Lowery Road, where a poorly anchored house was leveled, and some other homes sustained EF2 damage.

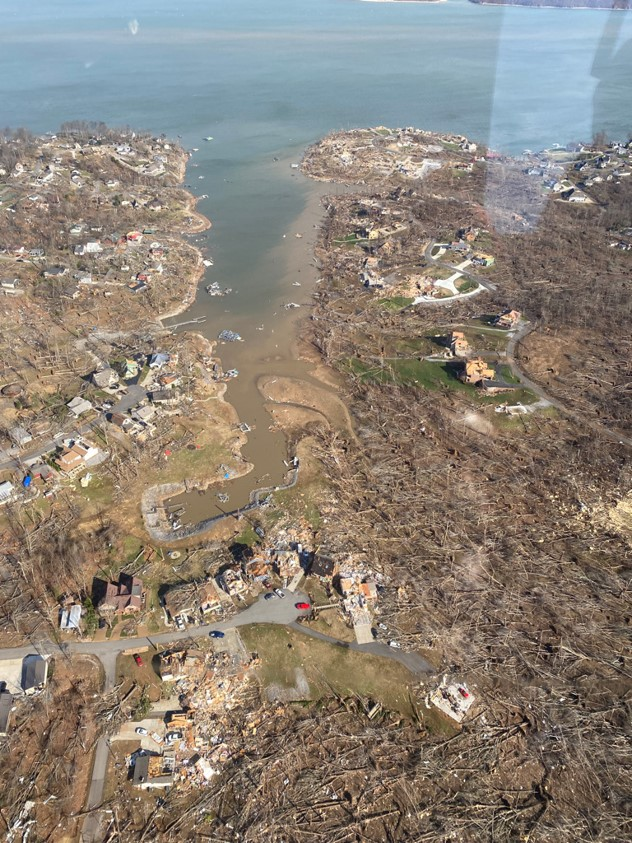
Aerial imagery of widespread destruction in Cambridge Shores, where the tornado impacted at low-end EF4 intensity

The tornado again reached EF4 intensity as it moved through the small community of Cambridge Shores, on the western shore of Kentucky Lake. Numerous homes, including large lakeside houses, were leveled or swept from their foundations. Large trees were snapped, denuded, and debarked, and vehicles were thrown. The roof of a fire department building was torn off and large, metal, boat-storage buildings were destroyed. The tornado then weakened but remained strong as it crossed Kentucky Lake into Lyon County and traversed the Land Between the Lakes National Recreation Area, leveling a large swath of trees and snapping power poles at EF2 strength as it passed near Twin Lakes before crossing Lake Barkley. After crossing Lake Barkley, the tornado strengthened back to EF3 intensity, and crossed KY 93 and I-24 near the lake's eastern shore, where many homes sustained major damage or were destroyed, and several houses were leveled or swept from their foundations.

Soon after, the tornado again explosively intensified and crossed into Caldwell County along KY 293, producing EF4 damage as it impacted the southern edge of Princeton, where another tornado emergency was issued. Two miles (3.2 km) before impacting Princeton, the tornado hit and destroyed a Kentucky mesonet station, which recorded 120.1 miles per hour (193.3 km/h) winds, setting the new record for the highest-measured wind gust in Kentucky history. Within two-miles, the tornado intensified to a minimum of 60 miles per hour (97 km/h). In Princeton, dozens of houses along the southern and southeastern fringes of town were destroyed, especially at the Princeton Golf and Country Club subdivision, where several houses were leveled or swept away. The University of Kentucky Research Center was destroyed; metal roof trusses were carried hundreds of yards from the structure and wrapped around trees. Cars were thrown from the parking lot into adjacent fields, metal light poles were ripped from their concrete footings, and ground scouring occurred. In and around Princeton, trees were stripped of their limbs and partially debarked, barns and farm buildings were destroyed, livestock was killed, and cycloidal markings were left in fields outside the town. Four deaths and numerous injuries occurred in Princeton. The tornado then followed US 62, producing EF2 to EF3 damage to homes in the small communities of Lewistown and Midway.

=== Dawson Springs, Barnsley, and Bremen ===
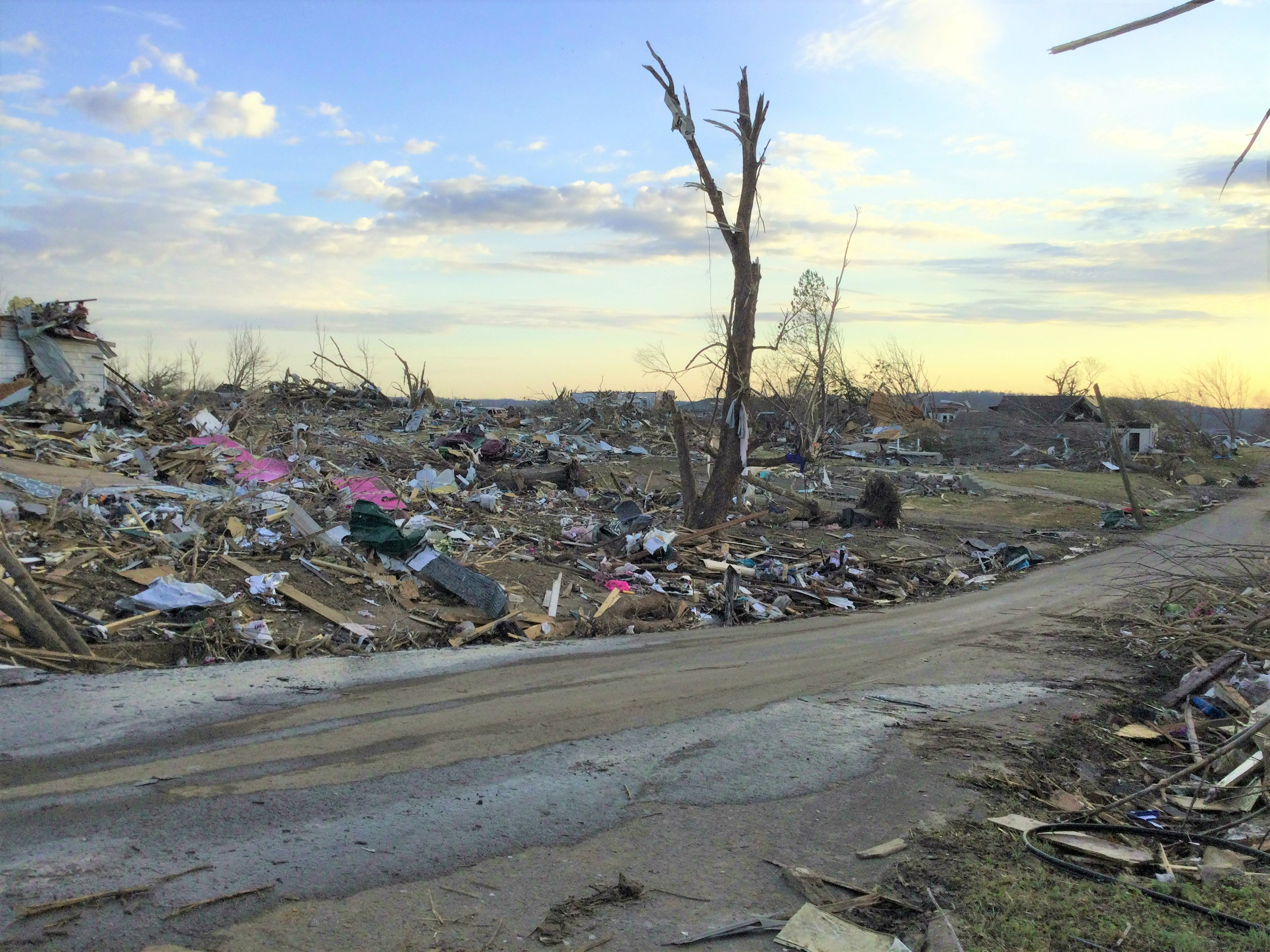
Widespread destruction in a residential area of Dawson Springs

Past Midway, the tornado became violent and again reached EF4 intensity as it moved along US 62, causing catastrophic damage as it entered the city of Dawson Springs, located along the Caldwell–Hopkins county line. A fourth tornado emergency was in effect for Dawson Springs and St. Charles as the storm moved through the area. In residential areas in northern Dawson Springs, entire blocks of homes were destroyed, and many houses were leveled or swept from their foundations. Cars were thrown, copious amounts of structural debris were strewn in all directions, countless trees were shredded and debarked, and only rubble remained in the hardest-hit neighborhoods. The Dawson Village apartment complex was destroyed and several two-story, brick apartment buildings sustained EF4 damage, being largely reduced to rubble with only a few first-floor interior walls left intact. The apartment complex had structural flaws and estimated failure wind speeds of 155 miles per hour (249 km/h). Vehicles were thrown into piles in the parking lot of the complex. Several duplexes at Clarkdale Court were destroyed, including one that was leveled with only a pile of debris remaining. An American Legion post and a car wash were flattened, and a church and a medical clinic sustained major damage. Some logistics facilities and warehouses in an industrial park were leveled as the tornado exited the city, as were several metal self-storage-unit buildings and large garages nearby.

Fourteen people were killed in the Dawson Springs area and many others were injured. A mother and her two children survived with major injuries by hanging on to a mattress as they were thrown 250 feet (76 m) through the air into a field after the tornado swept their Dawson Springs home from its foundation after crushing them underneath it first. A photograph from a destroyed house in Dawson Springs was lofted and transported almost 130 miles (210 km) by the intense tornadic updrafts, eventually being found in New Albany, Indiana.

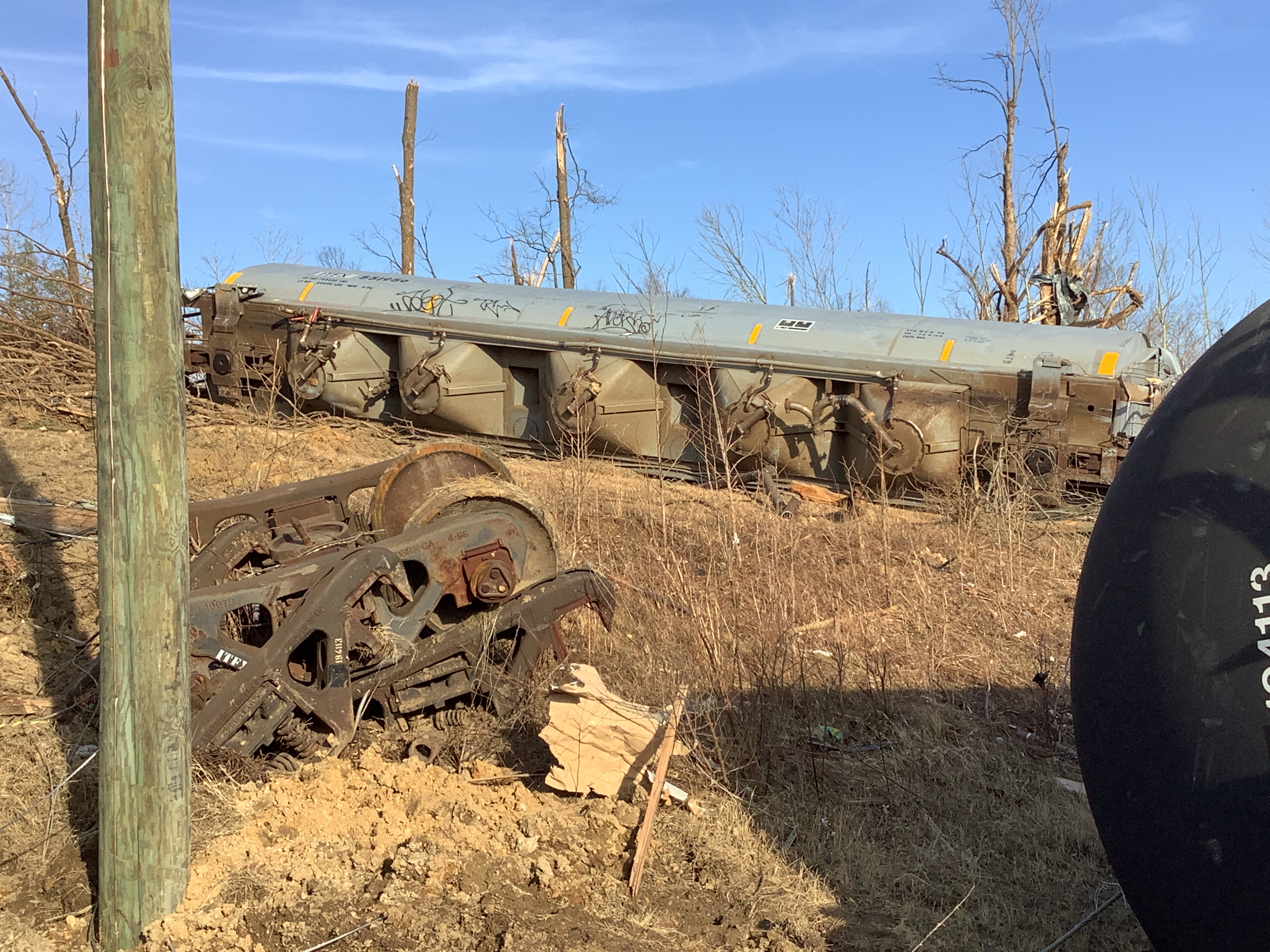
A multi-ton railroad freight car that was thrown from the tracks in Barnsley

Beyond Dawson Springs, the tornado tracked to the northeast, passing north of Ilsley and through the rural community of Carbondale, weakening slightly to high-end EF3 strength but continuing to cause major damage. Farm outbuildings and mobile homes were demolished, and houses sustained major damage or were destroyed. Additional high-end EF3 damage occurred and another tornado emergency was issued as it moved through Barnsley, just south of Earlington and Helca, and just north of Mortons Gap. Almost every house in the small community was damaged or destroyed, including some that were leveled, though they were not well-constructed. A train on the CSX Henderson Subdivision adjacent to US 41 in the town was derailed, as were 25 multi-ton freight cars, several of which were thrown from the tracks; one was tossed into a house. Thousands of large trees were downed and vehicles were flipped. Past Barnsley, the tornado crossed over the CSX Cut-Off Main line and I-69 before passing through an unpopulated, swampy area, where large trees were snapped or uprooted, and damage was rated EF2.

Continuing into northern Muhlenberg County, another tornado emergency was issued for the community of Bremen as the tornado approached from the southwest. It abruptly intensified to its peak intensity of high-end EF4 strength with estimated winds of 190 mph (310 km/h) winds as it crossed and paralleled KY 175 through the north side of town. Many homes were destroyed along this portion of its path, including several that were completely swept away with little debris remaining. Large trees were denuded and debarked, grass was scoured from the ground, and vehicles were thrown through the air and mangled. Some of the worst damage in Bremen occurred along Bethlehem Cemetery Road, where a row of four homes were completely swept away with only their foundations remaining, and debris was scattered long distances through fields across the street. Concrete floor slabs were torn from the foundation of one home and shattered, while the paved driveway of another residence was cracked and scoured. Houses that were farther away from the center of the damage path sustained roof and exterior wall loss. Mobile homes, barns, garages, and other outbuildings were also destroyed. At Bethlehem Baptist Church, a brick exterior wall was blown out and was shifted slightly off of its foundation, while Church Street General Baptist Church lost much of its roof.

Eleven people were killed in and around Bremen, and others were injured. Among the fatalities was District Judge Brian Crick, who represented Muhlenberg and McLean counties, as confirmed in a statement from the Supreme Court of Kentucky on December 11. After the tornado left Bremen, some weakening occurred; it crossed US 431 south of Stroud, where some houses and mobile homes were damaged or destroyed, and hundreds of large trees were snapped and denuded. Damage in this area was rated EF2 to low-end EF3.

=== Later damage and dissipation ===
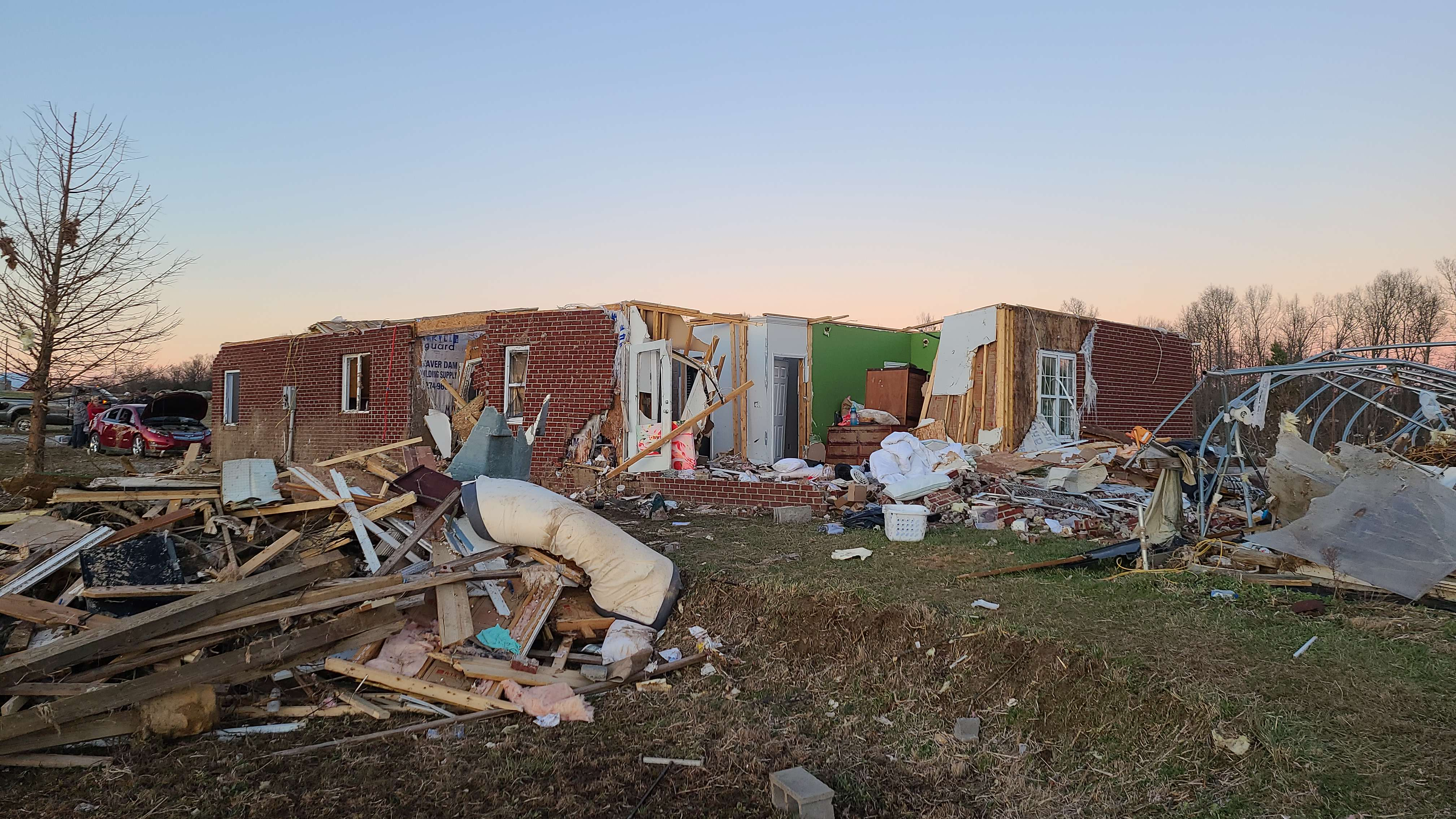
Major structural damage to a house near Hartford

While passing near the Muhlenberg–McLean county line, the tornado weakened substantially as it crossed into Ohio County at 11:10 p.m. (05:10 UTC), producing EF1 damage as it traversed rugged, hilly terrain to the west of Centertown. It moved through an abandoned coal-strip mine, overturning a large section of a coal conveyor belt, snapping trees, and downing power poles. A few farm outbuildings in this area were also damaged or destroyed. The tornado again strengthened north of Centertown along KY 85, producing EF2 damage; houses and outbuildings were damaged or destroyed, including a well-built house where much of the roof was torn off and an exterior wall collapsed. Five large chicken houses were destroyed, and hundreds of large, hardwood trees along a one-quarter-mile (400 m)-wide swath along this section of the path were snapped and uprooted. Weakening back to EF1 intensity, the tornado downed trees along Carter Ferry Road and Mud College Road.

The tornado entered a flatter area to the west of Hartford and began to intensify once more; large steel power poles were bent over or broken along Johnson School Road, earning an EF3 rating. North of Hartford, the tornado crossed US 231, I-165, and KY 69, and crossed the Rough River three times. Homes and businesses sustained significant EF3 damage in this area; two tractor-trailers were lifted and thrown 40 yards (37 m), and one of the cabs was mangled. Houses, barns, garages, a small brick office structure, silos, and a fertilizer storage facility were destroyed. The last area of EF3-strength damage occurred along KY 69 and Utley Drive northeast of Hartford, where a poorly anchored, block-foundation home was swept away and destroyed, and other houses lost their roofs and exterior walls. Two anchored mobile homes were swept away and destroyed, with their frames tossed and bent, and one was thrown 100 yards (91 m). An RV camper in this area was thrown 30 yards (27 m), landing upside down; tractors and hay bales were also thrown considerable distances. Damage of up to EF2 intensity occurred beyond this point as the tornado crossed Humble Valley Road, Halls Creek Road, and Mount Vernon Road before passing north of Olaton. Homes were significantly damaged, barns and mobile homes were destroyed, a cow was killed, and thousands of large hardwood trees were downed. The tornado paralleled the Ohio–Grayson county line and very briefly crossed a bend in the Rough River into Grayson County. Hundreds of trees along Cane Ford Road were downed and an abandoned trailer home was destroyed.

The tornado then crossed KY 54, where the last area of EF2 damage occurred, as a frail home was destroyed and left with only a few walls standing. Large trees were snapped and one of them fell on and destroyed a car. Some outbuildings in this area were also damaged or destroyed. Entering Breckinridge County at EF1 intensity, the tornado paralleled the Breckinridge–Grayson county line and crossed KY 110 northwest of Falls of Rough. Hundreds of trees in the area were downed and two structures sustained minor damage. The tornado downed power lines as it crossed KY 79 at EF0 strength, damaged a large boat-storage facility, and scattered sheet metal debris across the runway of a small airport. Some additional minor tree damage occurred before the tornado dissipated near Park Drive in Grayson County at 11:48 p.m. CST (5:48 UTC) as it entered Rough River Dam State Resort Park near Rough River Lake, approximately four miles (6.4 km) west of McDaniels.

=== Possible EF5 intensity ===
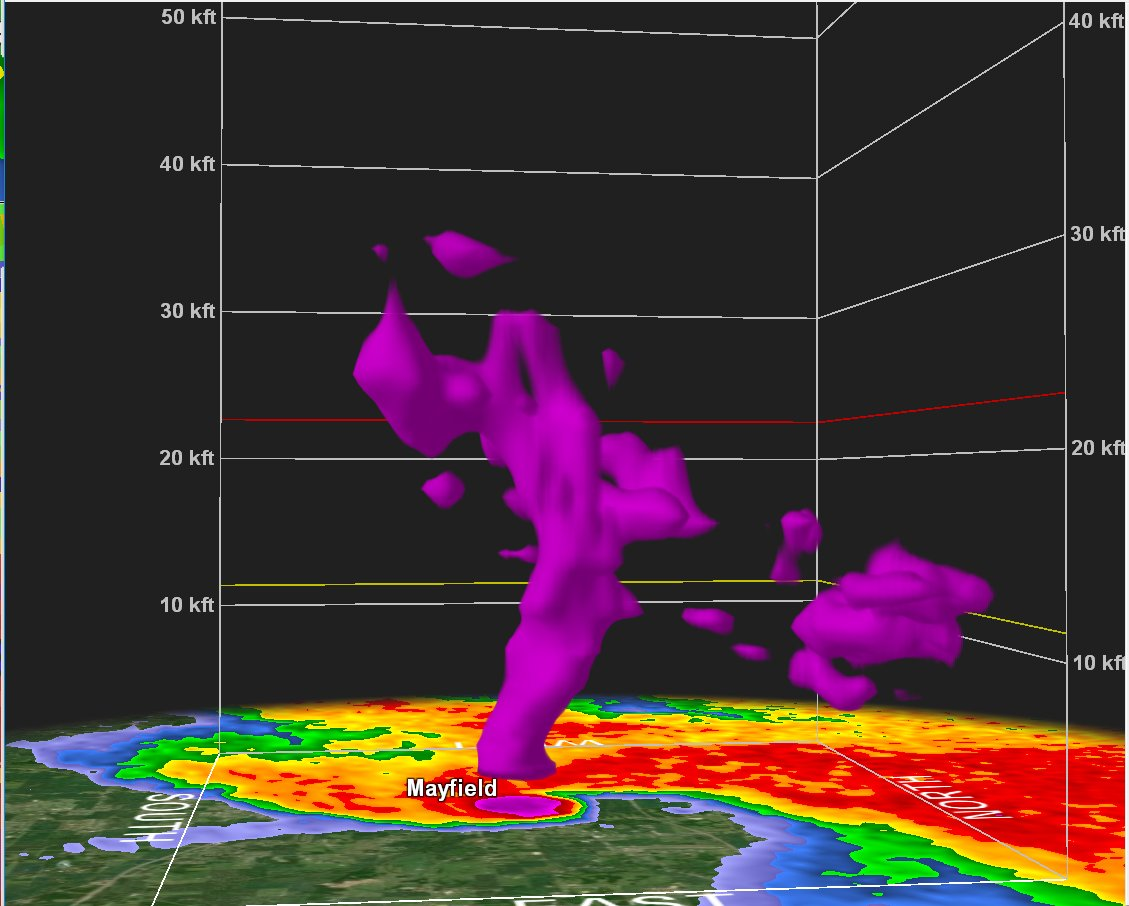
Radar 3D volume scan of the supercell showing debris lofted over 30,000 feet (9.1 km) in the air as the tornado struck Mayfield

In 2022, Timothy Marshall, a meteorologist, structural and forensic engineer; Zachary B. Wienhoff, with Haag Engineering Company; Christine L. Wielgos, a meteorologist at the National Weather Service of Paducah; and Brian E. Smith, a meteorologist at the National Weather Service of Omaha, published a damage survey of portions of the tornado's track, particularly through Mayfield and Dawson Springs. The report notes: "the tornado damage rating might have been higher had more wind resistant structures been encountered. Also, the fast forward speed of the tornado had little 'dwell' time of strong winds over a building and thus, the damage likely would have been more severe if the tornado were slower." Marshall later stated in 2023 that the Western Kentucky tornado was "the closest to EF5 that I can remember" since the Moore EF5 of 2013. Marshall also stated some of the buildings struck by the strongest winds "were horribly constructed and could not resist 100 or even 150 mph wind let alone 200 mph", meaning it was "impossible to know if EF5 winds affected them".

On January 23, 2025, Anthony W. Lyza with the National Severe Storms Laboratory along with Harold E. Brooks and Makenzie J. Kroca with the University of Oklahoma published a paper where they stated the tornado in Mayfield was an "EF5 candidate" and opined that the EF5 starting wind speed should be 190 mph (306 km/h) instead of 201 mph (323 km/h).

== Impacts ==
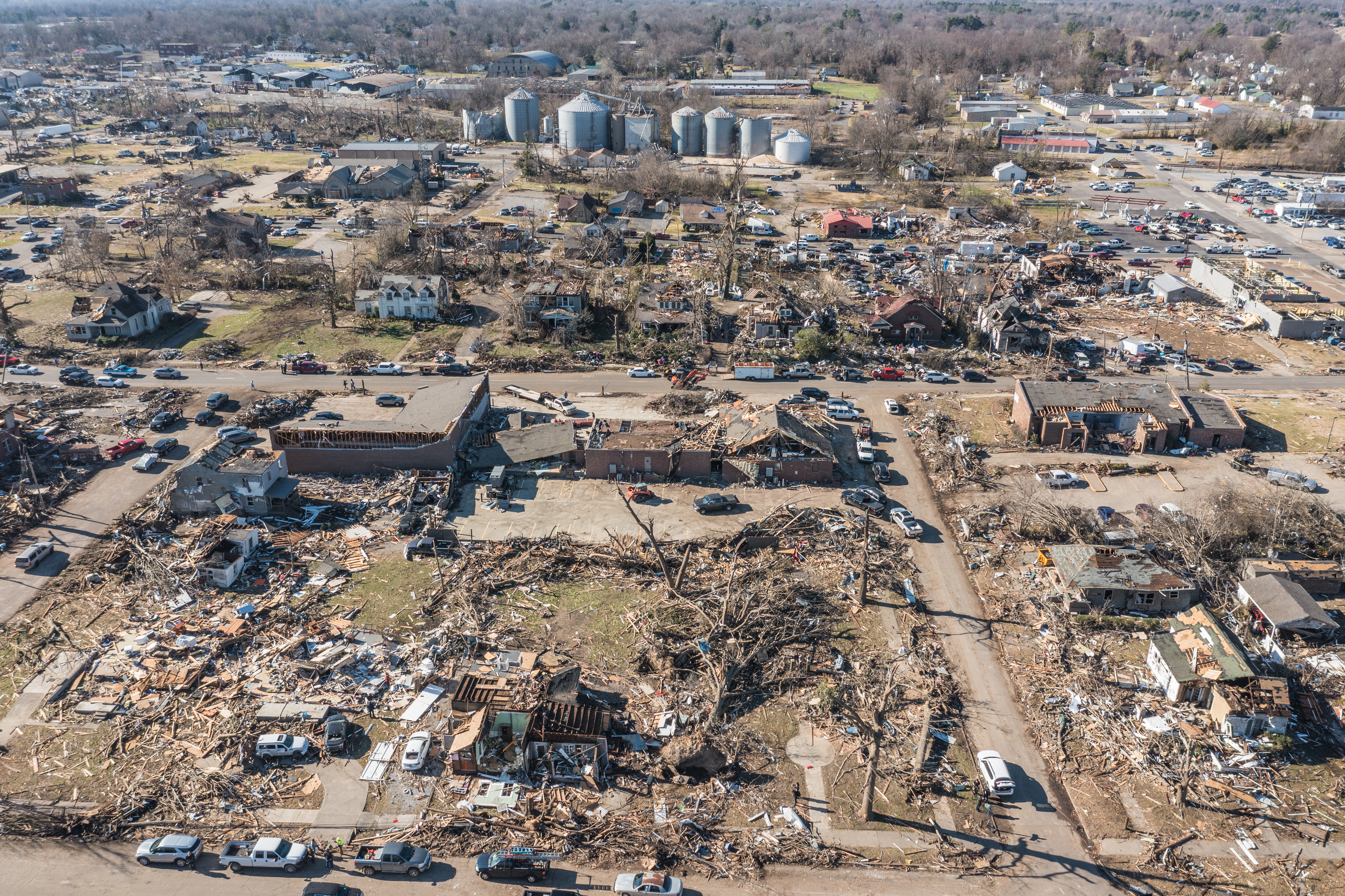
Aerial view of EF3 damage in Mayfield the day after the tornado

The tornado reached a peak width of 2,600 yards (2,400 m) and was on the ground for nearly three hours, tracking 165.6 miles (266.5 km) from Woodland Mills to Rough River Dam State Resort Park. The path was the ninth longest in recorded history. It was rated high-end EF4 with an estimated peak wind speed of 190 mph (310 km/h), as well was it the first violent tornado to occur in the state of Kentucky since another EF4 tornado struck in Kenton County on March 2, 2012.

=== Casualties ===
The tornado directly killed 57 people and resulted in 519 injuries; it was the deadliest tornado ever recorded in the United States in the month of December, and the deadliest tornado since the Joplin, Missouri tornado on May 22, 2011. In Graves County, 24 people died and more than 200 were injured; fifteen died in Hopkins County, eleven in Muhlenberg County, four in Caldwell County, and one person each in Fulton, Marshall, and Lyon counties. A 58th victim suffered a heart attack while clearing debris and is listed as an indirect fatality.

=== Damage ===
The tornado produced profound destruction in multiple communities. In Mayfield, more than 4,000 structures were damaged or destroyed, including 3,778 residences, 183 commercial buildings, and 103 other structures. The tornado destroyed primarily low-income rental housing units, leading to a depleted stock of affordable housing in the city; Mayfield Housing Authority reported it had more than 700 requests for one-bedroom units almost a year after the tornado.

In Marshall County, containing the heavily damaged community of Cambridge Shores, 356 structures were destroyed or made uninhabitable, and 341 more sustained light or moderate damage. In Muhlenberg County, the tornado caused an estimated $7 million in agricultural damage alone, according to the University of Kentucky Cooperative Extension Office.

== Response and recovery ==
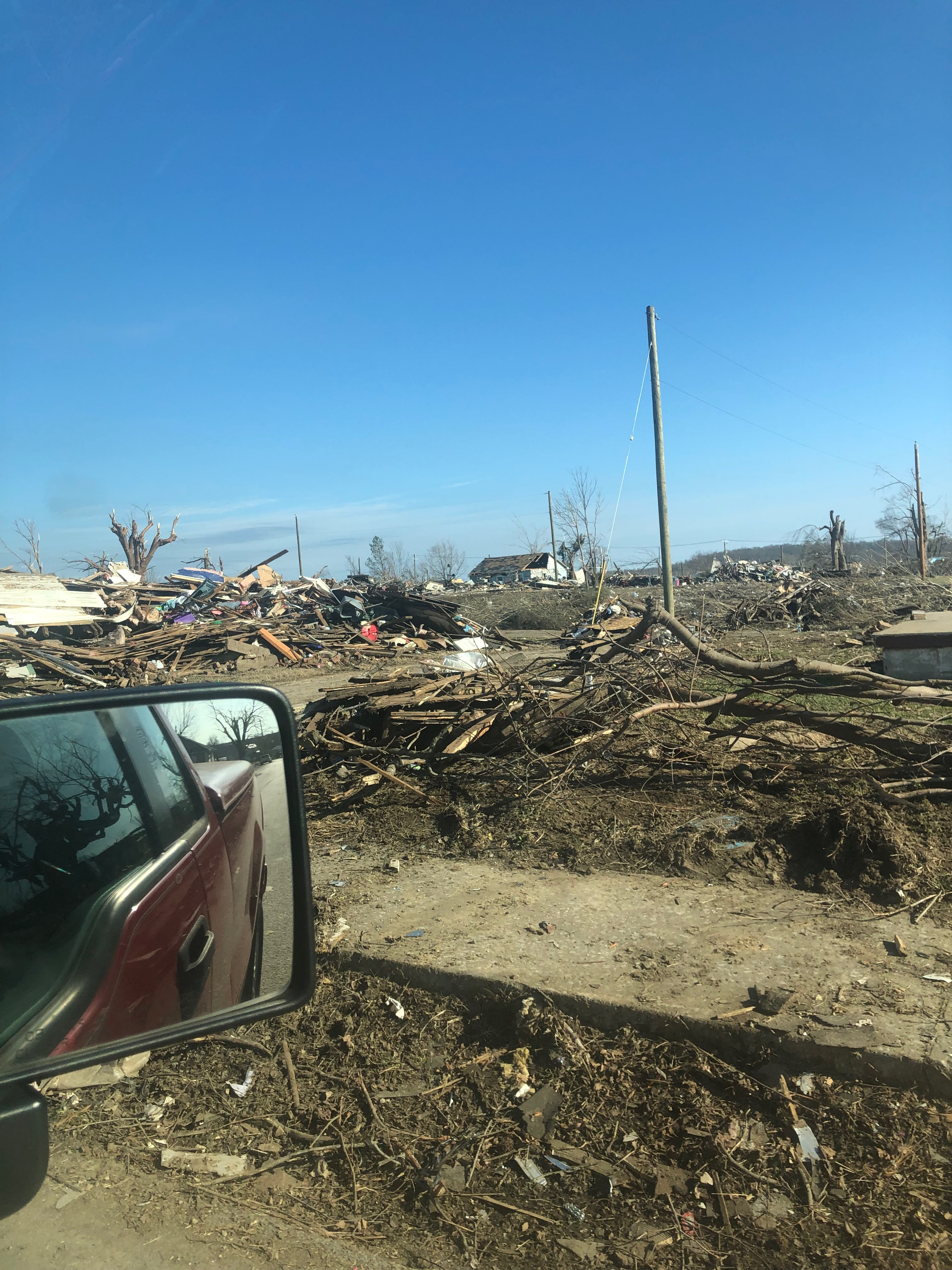
Debris and destroyed homes along Alexander Street in Dawson Springs

On December 11, 2021, Kentucky governor Andy Beshear declared a state of emergency for parts of western Kentucky; it was followed that day by U.S. president Joe Biden's approval of a federal emergency disaster declaration for the state of Kentucky. Beshear also announced the creation of a tornado relief fund and asked people to donate blood. On December 15, Mayor of Mayfield Kathy Stewart O'Nan said that recovery efforts would continue. The NWS office in Paducah requested mental-health officers be present to assist meteorologists for potential trauma from assessing the tornado's path of devastation.

On December 12, Federal Emergency Management Agency (FEMA) Administrator Deanne Criswell and U.S. Department of Homeland Security Secretary Alejandro Mayorkas visited areas of Graves and Marshall counties, met with emergency management officials and responders, and held a media briefing with Governor Beshear. Their visit was followed on December 15 by a visit from President Biden, who flew to Kentucky and toured Mayfield and Dawson Springs, meeting survivors. Describing the damage as "almost beyond belief", Biden announced that the disaster declaration had been amended to have the federal government pay the entire cost of debris removal, and overtime for law enforcement and emergency personnel for the next month.

The tornado's major impacts on Graves County Court operations, which included the destruction of the courthouse in Mayfield, led the Kentucky Supreme Court to suspend the county's court operations, including physical and electronic court filings, between December 13, 2021, and January 11, 2022.

The Mayfield Messenger, the city's main newspaper, began printing an extra 2,000 copies per printing run of its paper, distributing them for free around the city.

By February 14, 2022, the U.S. Army Corps of Engineers had cleared more than 280,000 cubic yards (210,000 m^{3}) of debris in Graves County, including Mayfield; by April 4, that number had risen to 265,453 cubic yards (202,953 m^{3}) of debris removed in Mayfield and 433,408 cubic yards (331,364 m^{3}) in total from Graves County. By May 2022, the Tennessee Valley Authority and the environmental nonprofit Living Lands and Waters, using excavators, barges, and volunteers, had removed 1.2 million pounds (540 metric tons) of tornado debris from Kentucky Lake. Objects found included entire docks, cars, kayaks, and personal effects.

=== Relief ===
Governor Beshear's administration created the Team Western Kentucky Tornado Relief Fund, which received approximately 150,000 individual donations for a total of $52 million. Disaster-relief and humanitarian groups such as the American Red Cross, The Salvation Army, and World Vision collected donations and provided aid. More than 4,500 people attended a tornado relief concert in August 2022.

In 2024, the City of Mayfield was awarded $31.5 million in federal-and-state grants to help rebuild roads in its downtown area. The U.S. Department of Transportation awarded the city $25 million through its Rebuilding American Infrastructure with Sustainability and Equity (RAISE) grant program. That money, along with $6.3 million in state transportation funding and $200,000 from other federal grants, was to be used to reconstruct around 2.5 miles (4.0 km) of high-traffic thoroughfares in the Graves County seat.

=== Rebuilding ===
In June 2022, Mayfield City Council put several blocks in the city's heavily impacted downtown under a building permit freeze as they decided how to rebuild in the area, before rezoning the area in December 2022 for "less restrictive" commercial and residential mixed-use development. In December 2022, a temporary memorial was placed in the Mayfield court square. In February 2023, Mayfield mayor Kathy O'Nan visited Louisville, Mississippi, which was struck by a devastating EF4 tornado in 2014, to tour the damage path and speak with city leaders about the rebuilding process and funding sources.

=== Mayfield candle factory lawsuit ===
The Mayfield Consumer Products candle factory building collapsed, causing eight deaths and numerous injuries. Accusations of factory management prohibiting workers from leaving before the tornado struck the factory were reported on December 13. Workers said management told them: "if you leave, you're more than likely to be fired". On December 17, it was reported multiple workers at the candle factory filed a lawsuit against Mayfield Consumer Products in state court, seeking compensation and punitive damages. The lawsuit alleged the factory had up to three-and-a-half hours to let workers leave as safety precautions and did not, and the company showed a "flagrant indifference to the rights of workers" and violated the Kentucky occupational safety and health workplace standards by refusing evacuations. The following January, the factory closed and Mayfield Consumer Products laid off approximately 250 workers there, shifting operations and the remaining workers to a new plant in the nearby town of Hickory.

On December 8, 2022, a second lawsuit was filed against Mayfield Consumer Products on behalf of three workers who were killed in the candle factory collapse and seven who survived. The lawsuit alleged "false imprisonment, intentional infliction of emotional distress and violation of Kentucky statutory law".

== See also ==
- Weather of 2021
- List of North American tornadoes and tornado outbreaks
- List of F4, EF4, and IF4 tornadoes
  - List of F4, EF4, and IF4 tornadoes (2020–present)
- List of deadliest tornadoes in the Americas
- List of case studies on tornadoes (2020–present)
- EF5 drought
- Tornado intensity
- Tornado records
- Tornado outbreak sequence of May 3–9, 1961 – A tornado outbreak sequence that affected multiple areas that were struck by this tornado
- 2025 Somerset–London tornado – Another deadly, nocturnal EF4 tornado that impacted areas in southeastern Kentucky over 3 years later
- 2017 Perryville tornado – A nocturnal EF4 tornado across Missouri and Illinois, which previously was the longest tracked tornado since then in the region
