= Lyon quintuplets =

First known set of quintuplets to have all been born alive, 1896

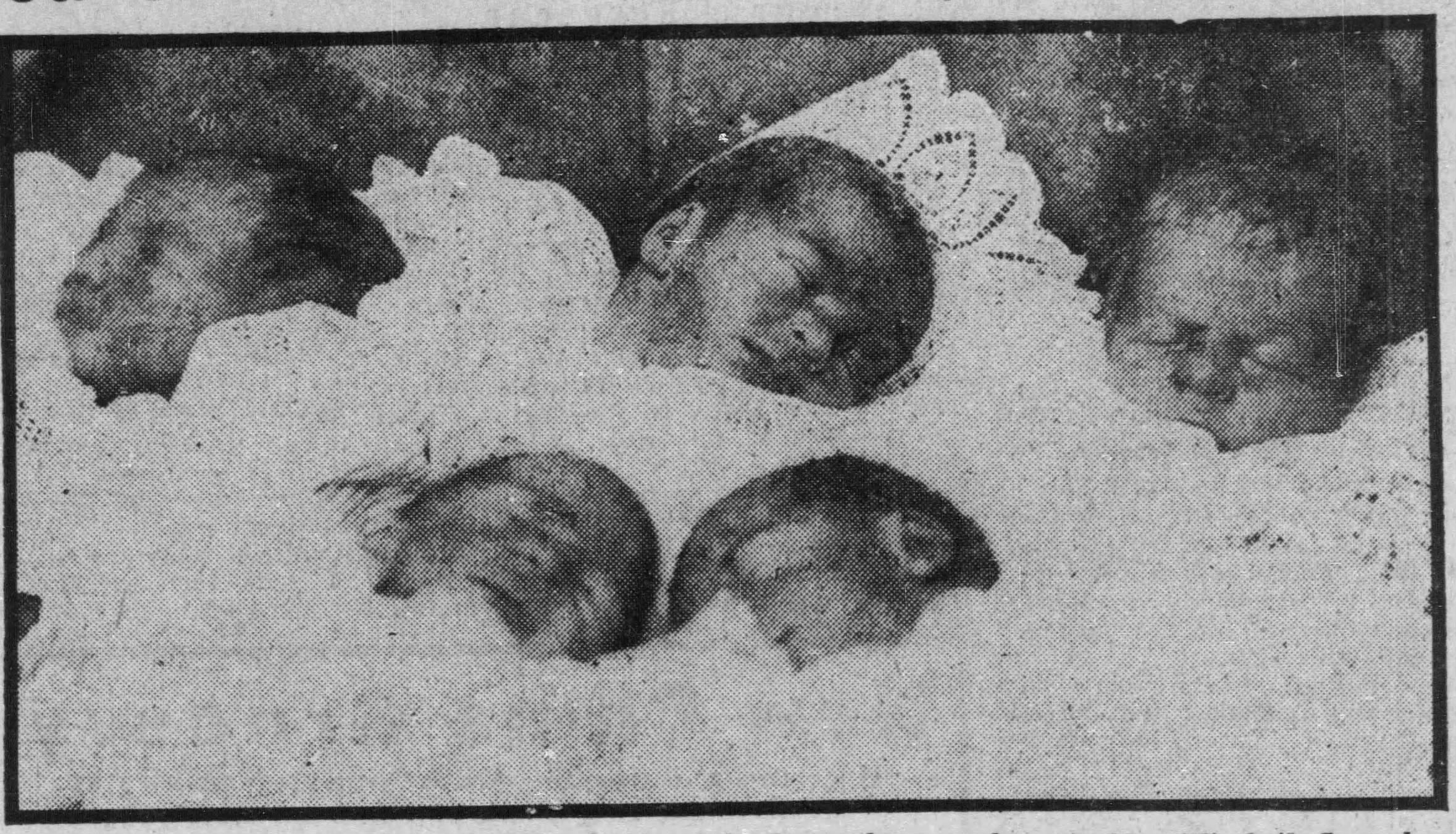
The Lyon quintuplets shortly after birth.

The Lyon quintuplets were the first known set of quintuplets to have all been born alive. Born to Oscar and Elizabeth Lyon of Mayfield, Kentucky, on April 29, 1896, all of the quintuplets died between May 4 and May 14. During their short lives and for two years after their deaths, the quintuplets were publicly displayed to thousands of visitors in Mayfield and surrounding towns. Since 1916, their remains have been in the collection of the National Museum of Health and Medicine in Silver Spring, Maryland. The sensation that surrounded the Lyon quintuplets preceded and paralleled the larger attention given to the Dionne quintuplets, all of whom survived infancy in 1934.

== Birth and deaths ==
Oscar and Elizabeth Lyon were married in 1874 and had previously had seven children, one of whom died before 1896. While pregnant, Elizabeth told her family that she had dreamed she would give birth to five or six babies. The quintuplets were delivered by local physician S. J. Matthews in the span of about an hour, between 9 and 10 p.m. on April 29, 1896. Elizabeth gave them the Biblical names that she remembered from her dream: Matthew, Mark, Luke, John, and Paul.

As early as the next day, the Lyon house had become a local attraction, with hundreds visiting the family each day to see the quintuplets. On May 1, a reporter for the Mayfield Monitor found that some of these visitors had traveled from as far as Louisville and St. Louis. Matthews allowed these visits for four hours each day. Visitors were encouraged to donate money for the babies' care. Elizabeth Lyon later said that these donations totalled about $600 ($23,220 in 2025), although she recalled seeing some visitors steal money from the donation jar. A promoter from Cincinnati offered to pay the Lyons $10,000 ($387,000 in 2025) if they would allow the quintuplets to be displayed at a museum for some months, but the family refused this and other similar offers.

One of the quintuplets died five days after birth on May 4. (Some sources identify John as the first to die, while others state that he lived the longest of the five.) The baby's body was buried at Mayfield's Macedonia Church of Christ Cemetery. However, this body was later exhumed and embalmed so that it could continue to be displayed alongside its siblings. Reportedly, Elizabeth Lyon feared that grave robbers would steal her son's body if it remained buried.

The remaining four quintuplets died in quick succession between May 11 and 14. Matthews, the attending physician, blamed their deaths on exposure to the elements – the Lyon house lacked window and door screens – and to the crowds of visitors who passed through. Elizabeth Lyon later said that the quintuplets had starved to death because she could not produce enough milk to nurse them. While the Lyons had received numerous donations of baby bottles and milk, baby bottles of the era were often unsanitary and spread diseases, and Lyon's physicians forbid her from using them. A wet nurse came to assist Elizabeth in feeding the babies, but this was insufficient to keep them alive.

== Remains and legacy ==
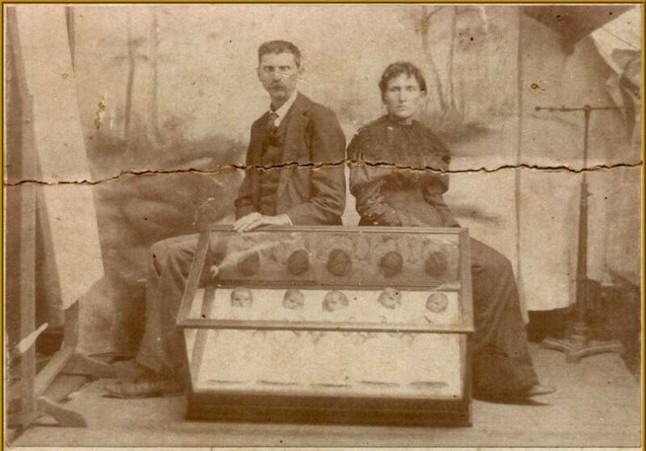
The embalmed remains of the quintuplets in their display case.

For two years after the deaths of the quintuplets, Dr. Matthews displayed their embalmed bodies at county fairs and other events in a three-state area. Elizabeth Lyon asked Matthews to stop these exhibitions in 1898, and the remains were kept in a wooden casket in Matthews' office after that. At one point, the casket was stolen, but the thief was quickly identified and arrested while stepping off a train in Louisville with the bodies, which were promptly returned to Mayfield. After Matthews' death in 1902, the Lyons kept the casket in their home. The family moved to Woodville, Kentucky, in 1912, and took the remains with them.

In 1915, facing financial difficulties, Elizabeth Lyon wrote to President Woodrow Wilson, offering to sell the bodies to the federal government for "a reasonable sum" if they could be used for "educational purposes". The Army Medical Museum offered to purchase the remains for $100 ($2,959 in 2025), which Elizabeth reluctantly accepted in 1916. The bodies remain in the collection of the museum (now known as the National Museum of Health and Medicine) to this day, although they are no longer on public display and can only be viewed upon special request. The methods used to embalm the bodies were unsuccessful in the long term, and the remains have become desiccated and mummified in the decades since their deaths.

The successful birth of the Dionne quintuplets, all of whom survived infancy, in Canada in 1934 revived public interest in the Lyon quintuplets, and several newspapers reprinted old stories or conducted new interviews with Elizabeth Lyon. Elizabeth died in 1941.

In 1974, Mayfield resident Avery Courtney began a campaign to have the quintuplets' remains returned to their hometown, so that they could be displayed there during the upcoming United States Bicentennial. The National Museum of Health and Medicine refused Courtney's request, stating that this would violate Elizabeth Lyon's wishes, as she had written in 1916 that she would "much rather for the Government to have them than any one else." None of the surviving descendants of Oscar and Elizabeth Lyon who were contacted supported Courtney's proposal, although some preferred that the remains would be returned to Mayfield for a proper burial. The burial plot at Macedonia Church of Christ Cemetery where one of the quintuplets was briefly interred has been set aside since 1896, in the event that their remains are ever returned.

Kentucky author Bobbie Ann Mason's 1993 novel, Feather Crowns, tells a fictionalized version of the Lyon quintuplets' story. Mason was born and raised near Mayfield and wrote in her memoir Clear Springs that her grandparents had lived close to the Lyon house in 1896.
