= Mayfield Consumer Products =

American candle manufacturer

- Company type: Family owned
- Industry: Consumer products
- Founded: 1998
- Founder: Mary Propes
- Area served: Kentucky
- Key people: Troy Propes (CEO)
- Products: Candle-based products, fragrances
- Owner: Troy Propes
- Number of employees: 245 (2018)

Mayfield Consumer Products (est. in 1998) is an American family-owned company, based in Mayfield, Kentucky. It manufactures branded candles and home fragrance products. On December 10, 2021, a Mayfield candle-making factory was leveled by a tornado, resulting in eight deaths and multiple injuries. The company faced multiple lawsuits, due to allegations of forcing their employees to stay in the factory.

== History ==
The company was started in 1998 in the garage of Mary Propes. The business would go on to sell candles and fragrances to retailers, like Bath & Body Works. In 2018, the firm invested more than $8.3 million to expand operations.

== 2021 tornado ==
Search and rescue teams at the Mayfield Consumer Products factory on December 13, 2021

On December 10, one of their factories, along with the nearby town of Mayfield, was leveled by a powerful tornado. The tornado made a direct hit to the facility, causing its destruction, and trapping the 110 employees in the building under the collapsed roof of the building. Some victims, after the tornado had passed, started posting for help on Facebook. After the tornado, rescue efforts were made for the employees, with most of them being accounted for by December 13. However, nine people died in the collapsed structure.

=== Lawsuits ===
The company went into controversy on December 17, 2021, when multiple employees started filing lawsuits against the company. Some employees stated that, before the tornado, the management at the factory threatened to fire employees if they tried to leave the building, as it counted as leaving their shift early. The Occupational Safety and Health Administration also stated that the building had "serious" safety violations, resulting in a $9,810 (2019 USD) fine from the administration in 2019. As of January 2025, the OSHA was investigating the factory.
