= Mayfield, Kentucky =

- City
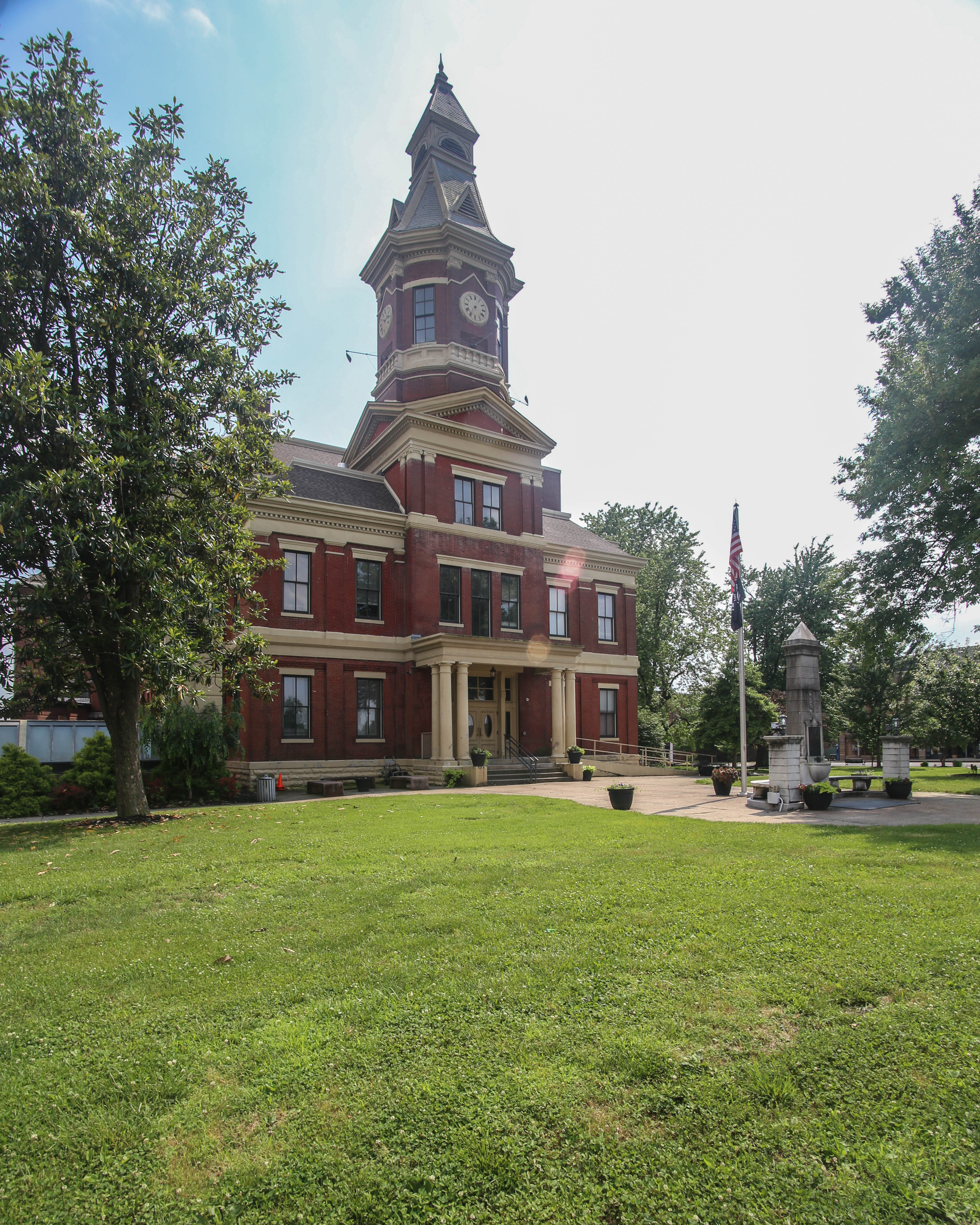
- Graves County Courthouse and Confederate monument in 2018. The courthouse was severely damaged by the 2021 Western Kentucky tornado on December 10, 2021, and was demolished in 2022.

- Flag Seal Logo

- Location within Graves County and Kentucky
- Coordinates: 36°44′30″N 88°38′9″W
- Country: United States
- State: Kentucky
- County: Graves
- Established: 1824
- Incorporated: 1846
- Named for: Mayfield Creek

Government
  - Mayor: Kathy Stewart O'Nan

Area
  - Total: 7.38 sq mi (19.11 km^{2})
  - Land: 7.35 sq mi (19.03 km^{2})
  - Water: 0.035 sq mi (0.09 km^{2})
- Elevation: 476 ft (145 m)

Population (2020)
  - Total: 10,017
  - Estimate (2022): 9,894
  - Density: 1,364/sq mi (526.5/km^{2})
- Time zone: UTC−6 (CST)
  - Summer (DST): UTC−5 (CDT)
- ZIP Code: 42066
- Area code: 270 & 364
- FIPS code: 21-50898
- GNIS ID: 497715
- Website: mayfieldky.gov

Mayfield is a home rule–class city and the county seat of Graves County, Kentucky, United States. The population was 10,017 as of the 2020 United States Census.

== History ==
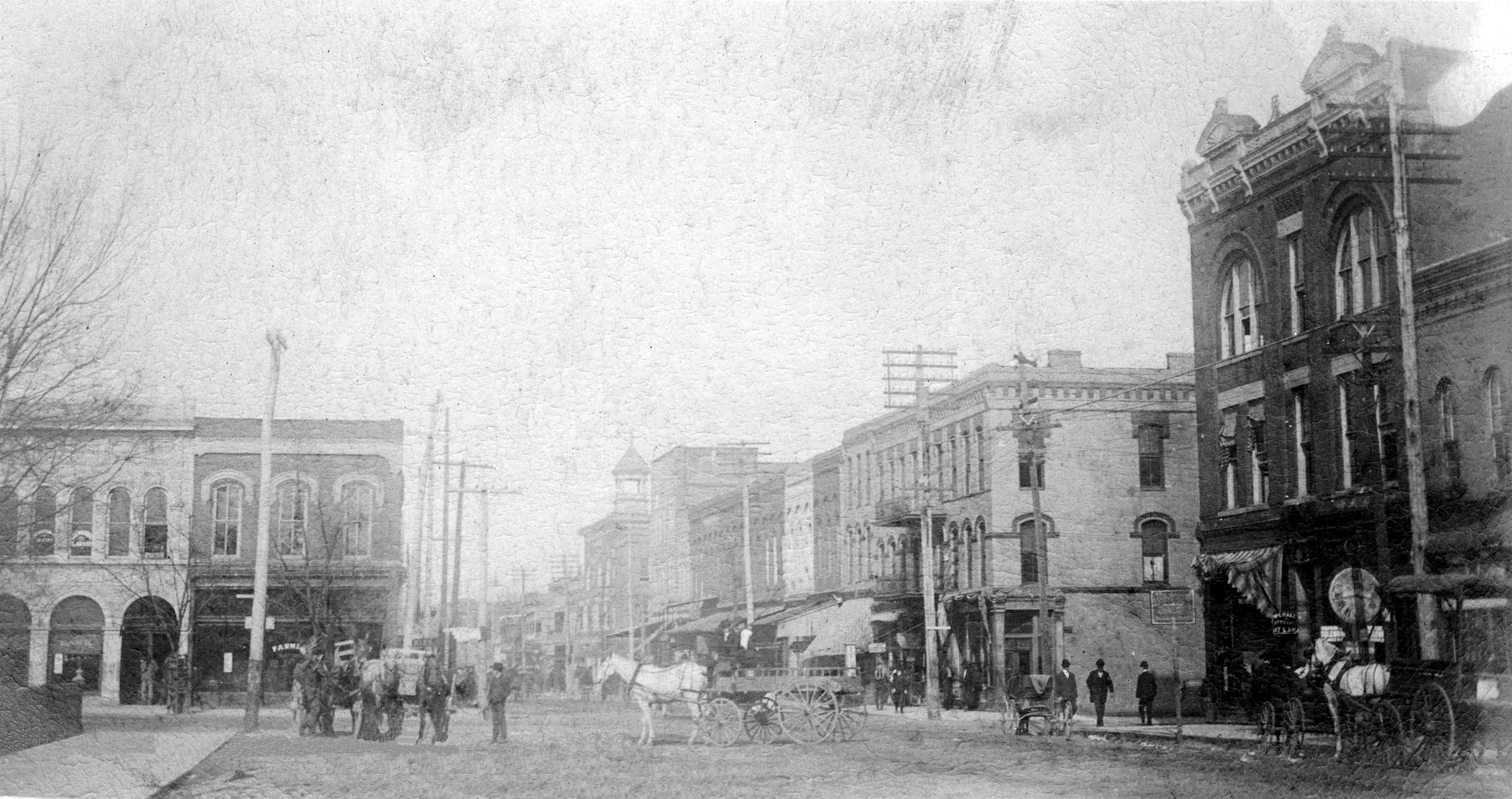
1906 Broadway looking west in Mayfield

=== 19th century ===
Mayfield is in the center of the Jackson Purchase, an eight-county region purchased by Isaac Shelby and Andrew Jackson from the Chickasaw people in 1818. Mayfield was established as the county seat of Graves County in 1821, and the county was formally organized in 1823. John Anderson is believed to have been the first white settler, arriving in 1819 and building a log home on Mayfield Creek. In December 1821, Anderson was appointed county court clerk and moved about two and a half miles to the site that became Mayfield. According to Trabue Davis, the town's name originates indirectly from a gambler named Mayfield, who was kidnapped about 1817 at a racetrack near what is now Hickman. He was carried to the site of today's Mayfield, where he carved his name into a tree in hopes that someone would see it. He tried to escape but drowned trying to cross what is now called Mayfield Creek. The town took its name from the creek.

The completion of the Memphis, New Orleans, and Northern Railroad in 1858 connected Mayfield with the outside world. Beginning with the founding of the Mayfield Woolen Mills in 1860, manufacturing clothing became the main industry in Mayfield for the next hundred years. The town was also a major market for loose-leaf tobacco, and was part of the Black Patch, where Dark Fired Tobacco was processed.

During the Civil War, the Jackson Purchase area, including Mayfield, strongly supported the Confederate cause. It has been called "Kentucky's South Carolina". On May 29, 1861, a group of Southern sympathizers from Kentucky and Tennessee met at the Graves County Courthouse to discuss the possibility of joining the Jackson Purchase to West Tennessee. Most records of the event are lost, probably due to an 1887 fire that destroyed the courthouse.

=== 20th century ===
In 1907, Fulton County judge Herbert Carr recalled that the Mayfield Convention adopted a resolution for secession. An historical marker in front of the Graves County courthouse now proclaims this as fact. However, records of the meeting kept by a Union sympathizer do not mention any such resolution. Historian Berry Craig argues that the convention believed Kentucky would eventually secede and a resolution to break away was unnecessary. Surviving records do show that the convention adopted resolutions condemning President Abraham Lincoln for "waging a bloody and cruel war" against the South, urging Gov. Beriah Magoffin to resist Union forces, and praising him for refusing to answer Lincoln's demand for soldiers. They also condemned the Federal government for providing "Lincoln guns" to Union sympathizers in eastern Kentucky. The convention nominated Henry Burnett to represent Kentucky's First District in Congress. The Mayfield Convention was followed by the Russellville Convention, which created the provisional Confederate government of Kentucky.

During and after Reconstruction, there was considerable white violence against blacks in the county. In one week in late December 1896, four black men were lynched in Mayfield. After Jim Stone was lynched, whites became fearful after hearing that blacks were arming to retaliate. They called for reinforcements from Fulton County, and fatally shot Will Suett, a young innocent black man getting off the train. The large white mob killed two more African-American men before the violence ended. Whites also burned four houses of African Americans.

During the Civil Rights Movement of the 1950s and 1960s, the local schools were slow to integrate, but they finally did so without violence. The "Mayfield Ten", ten black students from the segregated Dunbar High School, were allowed to register in 1956 at all-white Mayfield High School.

=== 21st century ===
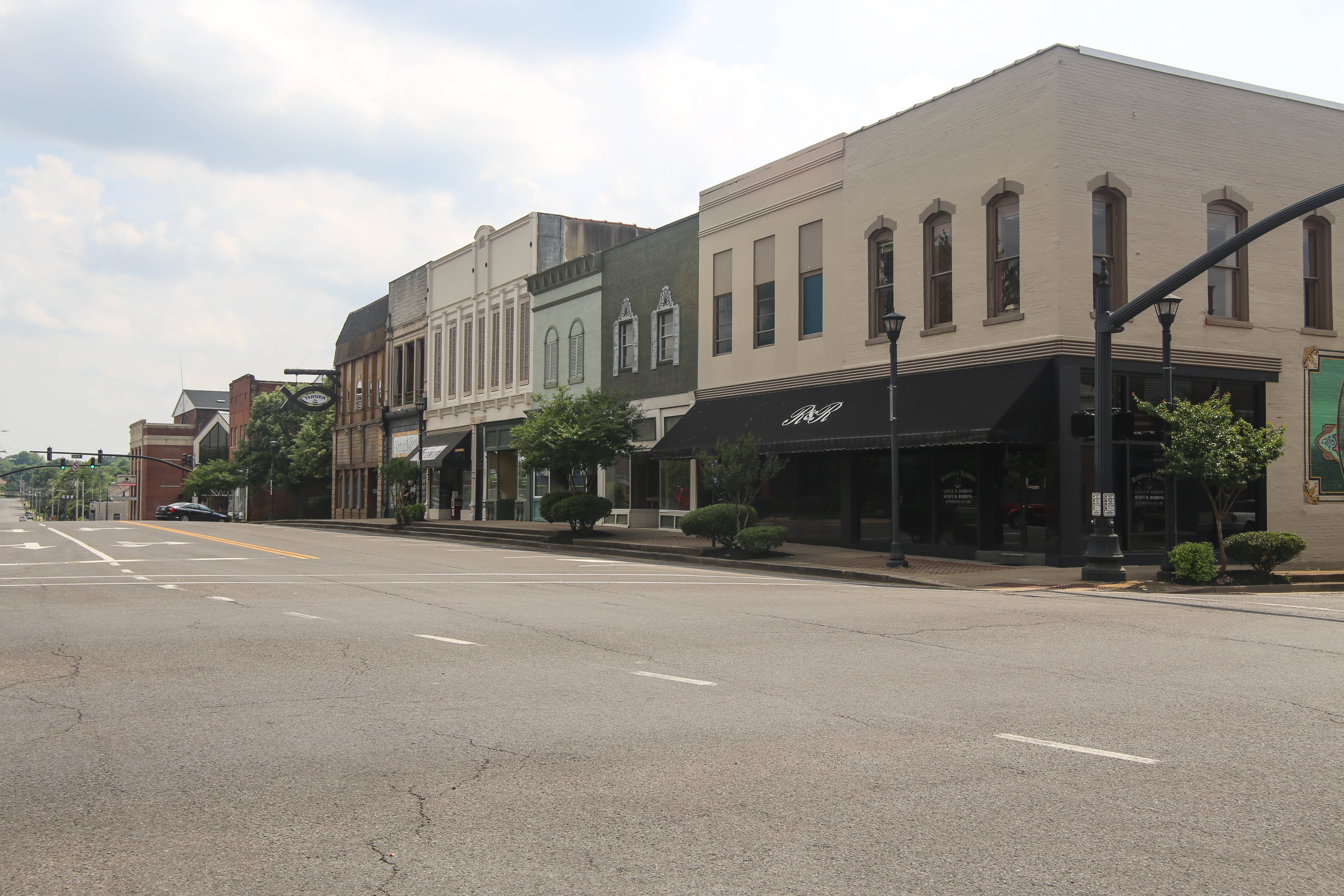
Mayfield in 2018

In 2000, local resident Jessica Currin was murdered. The case was finally closed nearly seven years later with the help of a local amateur investigator named Susan Galbreath and Tom Mangold, a British journalist.

On May 10, 2016, an EF3 tornado passed just north of the city limits, resulting in ten injuries.

==== December 2021 tornado outbreak ====
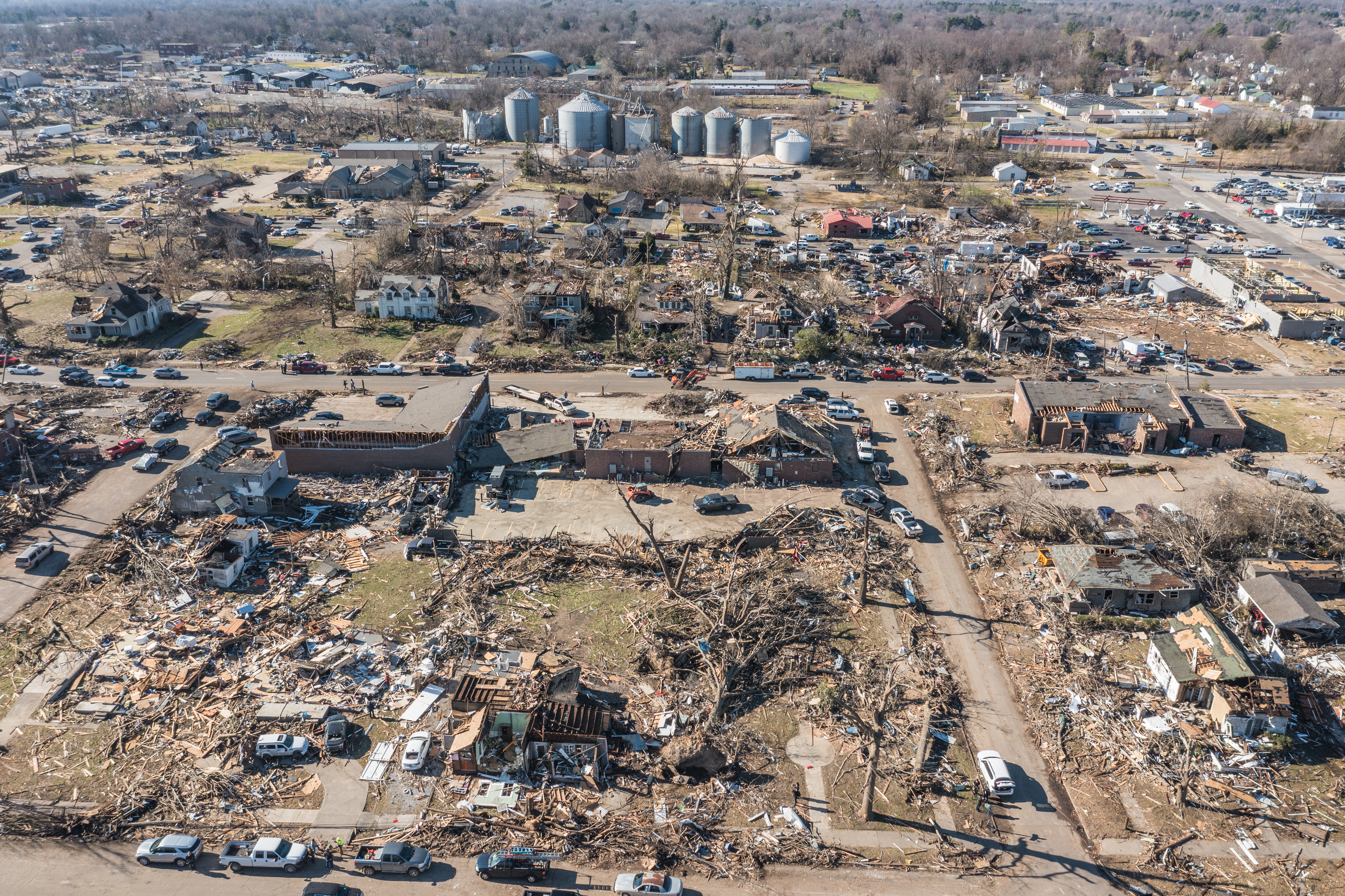
Aerial view of the city of Mayfield on December 12, 2021

During the evening of December 10, 2021, a destructive long-track tornado impacted areas of Kentucky including Mayfield, causing significant amounts of damage and leveling most of downtown.

The roof of Mayfield Consumer Products, a candle-making factory, collapsed during the tornado, with the fear that dozens died trapped within the building's remnants. Estimates are that more than 100 employees were inside the factory when the tornado hit. By December 12, the company reported there had been eight deaths and eight remained missing. Many had gathered in a tornado shelter and left after the storm, and without power and phones they were not quickly located and accounted for. Workers filed a class-action lawsuit against their employer on December 16, after allegations by some workers that they were told they would be fired if they left work before the tornado hit. The allegations have been denied by the company.

== Geography ==
According to the United States Census Bureau, the city has a total area of 6.9 square miles (17.9 km^{2}), of which 0.03 square miles (0.08 km^{2}), or 0.43%, is water.

Interstate 69 forms a bypass to the northwest of Mayfield, running along or close to the city limits. Access is from Exits 21 through 25. The parkway leads northeast 28 miles (45 km) to Interstate 24 near Kentucky Dam, and southwest 22 miles (35 km) to Fulton. U.S. Route 45 leads north from Mayfield 26 miles (42 km) to Paducah on the Ohio River and southwest to Fulton. Kentucky Route 80 leads southeast 24 miles (39 km) to Murray.

=== Climate ===
The climate in this area is characterized by hot, humid summers and generally cool winters. According to the Köppen climate classification system, Mayfield has a humid subtropical climate, abbreviated "Cfa" on climate maps.

== Demographics ==
Historical population
Census	Pop.	Note	%±
1830	44		—
1860	556		—
1870	779		40.1%
1880	1,839		136.1%
1890	2,909		58.2%
1900	4,081		40.3%
1910	5,916		45.0%
1920	6,583		11.3%
1930	8,177		24.2%
1940	8,619		5.4%
1950	8,990		4.3%
1960	10,762		19.7%
1970	10,724		−0.4%
1980	10,705		−0.2%
1990	9,935		−7.2%
2000	10,349		4.2%
2010	10,024		−3.1%
2020	10,017		−0.1%
2024 (est.)	9,805		−2.1%

=== 2020 census ===
As of the 2020 census, Mayfield had a population of 10,017. The median age was 36.1 years. 27.1% of residents were under the age of 18 and 18.0% of residents were 65 years of age or older. For every 100 females, there were 88.5 males, and for every 100 females age 18 and over, there were 85.2 males age 18 and over.

98.3% of residents lived in urban areas, while 1.7% lived in rural areas.

There were 4,025 households in Mayfield, including 2,138 family households. Of all households, 32.9% had children under the age of 18 living in them, 35.4% were married-couple households, 18.8% were households with a male householder and no spouse or partner present, and 38.3% were households with a female householder and no spouse or partner present. About 34.9% of all households were made up of individuals, and 16.6% had someone living alone who was 65 years of age or older.

There were 4,556 housing units, of which 11.7% were vacant. The homeowner vacancy rate was 2.3% and the rental vacancy rate was 8.6%.

Racial composition as of the 2020 census
Race	Number	Percent
White	6,765	67.5%
Black or African American	1,216	12.1%
American Indian and Alaska Native	38	0.4%
Asian	76	0.8%
Native Hawaiian and Other Pacific Islander	0	0.0%
Some other race	1,010	10.1%
Two or more races	912	9.1%
Hispanic or Latino (of any race)	1,793	17.9%

=== 2000 census ===
As of the census of 2000, there were 10,349 people, 4,358 households, and 2,667 families residing in the city. The population density was 1,549.8 inhabitants per square mile (598.4/km^{2}). There were 4,907 housing units at an average density of 734.8 per square mile (283.7/km^{2}). The racial makeup of the city was 60.57% White, 13.31% African American, 0.21% Native American, 0.37% Asian, 3.48% from other races, and 2.07% from two or more races. Hispanics or Latinos of any race were 25.86% of the population. Recent years have seen a large influx of Amish residents who farm in the county.

There were 4,358 households, out of which 26.9% had children under the age of 18 living with them, 42.4% were married couples living together, 15.6% had a female householder with no husband present, and 38.8% were non-families. 35.3% of all households were made up of individuals, and 18.9% had someone living alone who was 65 years of age or older. The average household size was 2.27 and the average family size was 2.89.

The age distribution was 23.3% under the age of 18, 9.2% from 18 to 24, 24.9% from 25 to 44, 20.9% from 45 to 64, and 21.6% who were 65 years of age or older. The median age was 39 years. For every 100 females, there were 86.0 males. For every 100 females age 18 and over, there were 80.0 males.

The median income for a household in the city was $20,400, and the median income for a family was $27,463. Males had a median income of $29,324 versus $18,575 for females. The per capita income for the city was $15,327. About 23.4% of families and 27.5% of the population were below the poverty line, including 40.4% of those under age 18 and 15.9% of those age 65 or over.

Despite previously being in a dry county (Graves), sales by the drink in restaurants of the city limits of Mayfield seating at least 100 diners and at the Mayfield Golf & Country Club are allowed. In 2016, Graves County voted to become a wet county.

== Arts and culture ==
=== Wooldridge Monuments ===
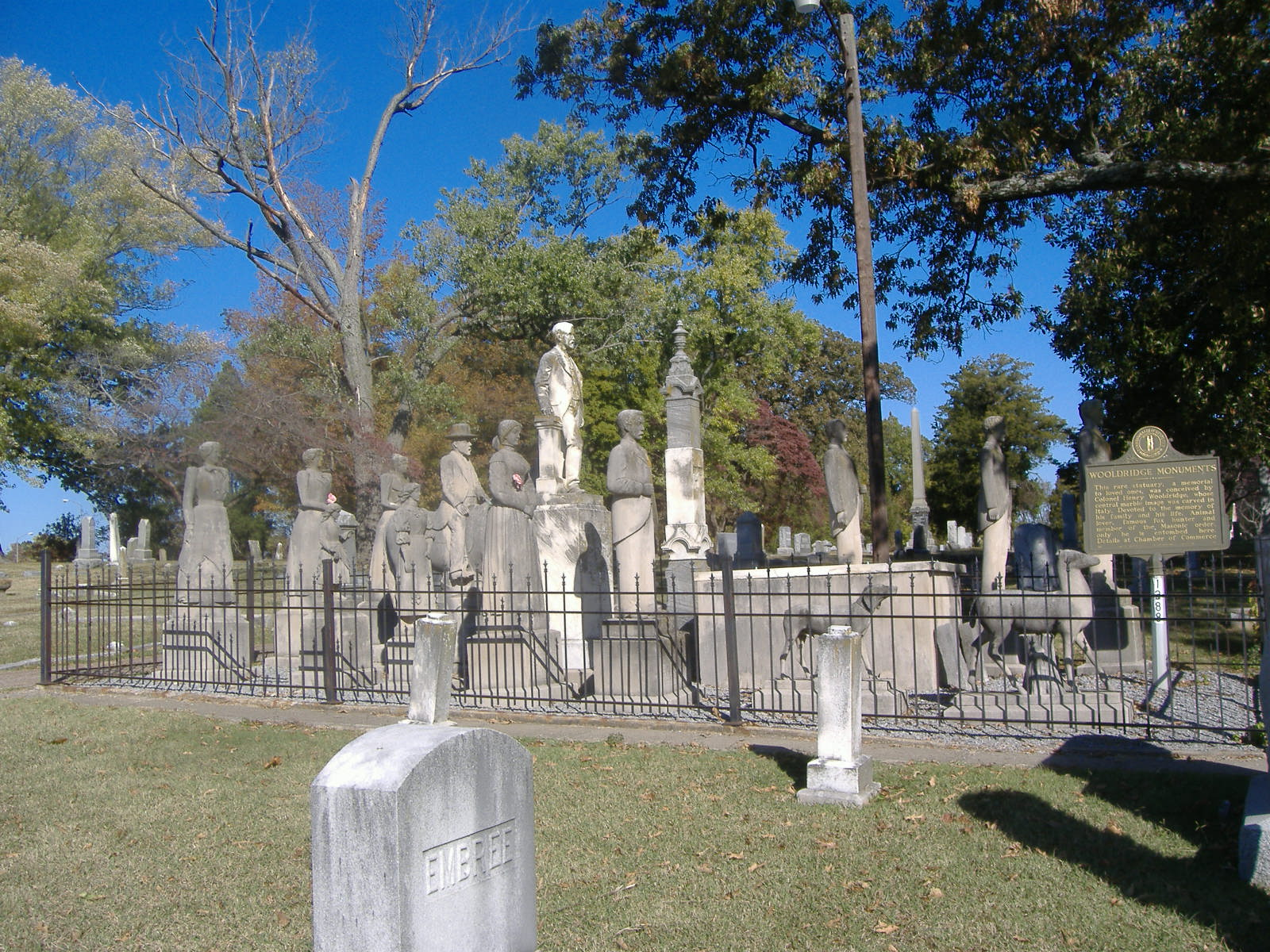
Wooldridge Monuments (2008)

Mayfield is home to the Wooldridge Monuments, a series of historical monuments located in Maplewood Cemetery. They were built for Colonel Henry G. Wooldridge from 1892 until Wooldridge's death on May 30, 1899, to commemorate family members and other loved ones. The lot has been called "The Strange Procession That Never Moves".

== Sports ==
Mayfield was home to professional baseball's minor league Class D Kentucky–Illinois–Tennessee League (or KITTY League) Mayfield Pantsmakers (1922–1924), Mayfield Clothiers (1936–1938, 1946–1955), and Mayfield Browns (1939–1941).

The Clothiers were the first team to integrate the Kitty League when they employed African-American and Mayfield native Mickey Stubblefield as a pitcher during the 1952 season.

== Education ==
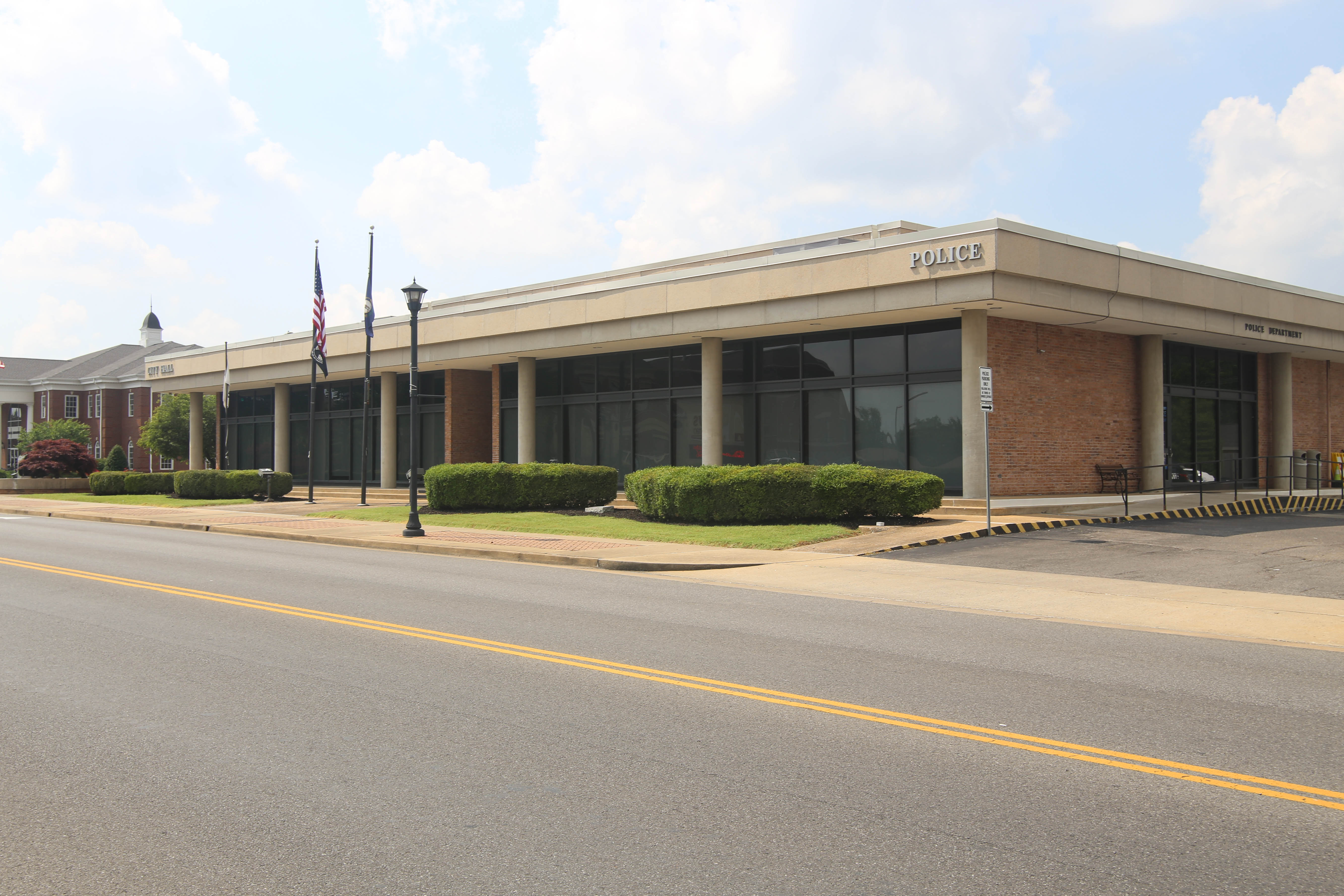
Mayfield City Hall (2018)

Mid-Continent University, formerly Mid-Continent Baptist Bible College, was located just north of Mayfield off U.S. Route 45. It closed after the spring 2014 term due to alleged financial (aid) mismanagement.

Mayfield Independent City School District was established on July 1, 1908, with the selection and meeting of its first board members, organized by Mr. W.J. Webb. The District includes Mayfield High School.

Mayfield has a lending library, the Graves County Public Library.

== Media ==
Local media in Mayfield includes the Mayfield Messenger, a three-day (Sunday, Wednesday, Friday) newspaper. Radio stations WLLE, WNGO, and WYMC are licensed to Mayfield, though WLLE and WNGO mainly focus on the direct Paducah area.

== Notable people ==
- Lucien Anderson, U.S. representative from Kentucky
- Lon Carter Barton, historian
- Lyon quintuplets, set of quintuplets
- David Boaz, libertarian political theorist and executive of the Cato Institute
- Andrew Boone, U.S. representative from Kentucky
- Billy Joe "Cornbread Red" Burge, billiards player
- Betsy Cook, singer, songwriter, musician
- Randy Galloway, sports journalist and Texas radio personality
- Rex Geveden, president and CEO of BWX Technologies.
- Tripp Gibson, Major League Baseball umpire
- Noble J. Gregory, U.S. representative from Kentucky
- W. Voris Gregory, U.S. representative from Kentucky
- Chet Holifield, U.S. representative from California
- Helen LaFrance, artist
- Bobbie Ann Mason, author
- Ersa Hines Poston, civil service and employment reformer
- Kent Robbins, songwriter
- Kevin Skinner, musician and America's Got Talent winner
- Robert Burns Smith, third governor of Montana
- Beulah Winn Stunston (1880–1959), civic leader
- Chuck Taylor, professional wrestler
- Martha Nelson Thomas, creator of "Doll Babies", later plagiarized as Cabbage Patch Kids
- Ellis Wilson, artist

== See also ==
- List of sundown towns in the United States
