= Beulah Winn Stunston =

American civic leader

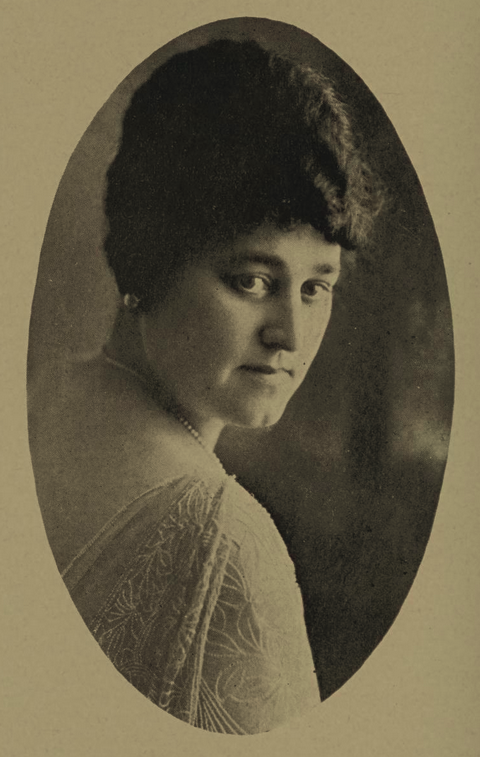
- Portrait of Stunston from Biographies of Representative Women of the South

Kentucky Division President, United Daughters of the Confederacy

Personal details
- Born: Beulah Winn; November 17, 1880 Mayfield, Kentucky, U.S.
- Died: May 7, 1959 (aged 78) Los Angeles County, California, U.S.
- Spouse: James Louis Stunston
- Children: 1

Beulah Winn Stunston (November 17, 1880 – May 7, 1959), also known as Mrs. J. L. Stunston, was an American socialite, civic leader, and public health official. She served as the Kentucky state president of the United Daughters of the Confederacy and as the President of the Kentucky Tuberculosis Commission, the Secretary of the Kentucky Health and Welfare League, and the Director of the Kentucky Public Health Nurse Work.

== Early life and family ==
Stunston was born in Mayfield, Kentucky to Albert McNeill Winn and Frances Curd. Through her Winn and Snead family, she traced her lineage back to Virginian colonists and patriots of the American Revolution.

== Civic roles ==
Stunston was appointed by Kentucky governor Augustus Owsley Stanley to a seat on the Board the Kentucky Tuberculosis Commission and served as president of the board. She also served as secretary of the Kentucky Health and Welfare League and as director of the Kentucky Public Health Nurse Work.

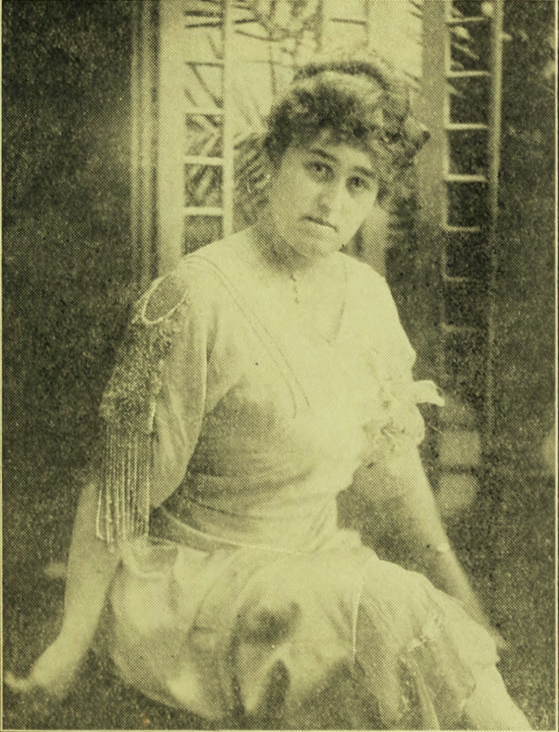
Portrait of Stunston published in the Confederate Veteran

She was a member of the United Daughters of the Confederacy and served as president of the Kentucky Division. She was unanimously elected to that office in 1919. Prior to her election, she had served two terms as president of the Mayfield Chapter of the UDC and as two terms as recording secretary for the Kentucky Division. As state president, she attended the UDC's general convention in Asheville, North Carolina in 1920. She was a member of the 1920 general convention's finance committee and served as chairwoman of pages. She was also member of the Woman's Advisory Committee to the Board of the Kentucky Confederate Home.

During World War I, Stunston volunteered with the American Red Cross, Liberty Loan, and the Council of National Defense.

== Personal life and death ==
She was married to James Louis Stunston, a prominent banker and capitalist. She had one son, Louis Winn Stunston, and a stepson, James Stunston Jr., from her husband's first marriage to Sudie Hunt.

She and her husband moved to California in 1923. Stunston died at her home in Los Angeles County, California in 1959.
