= Mickey Stubblefield =

- Pitcher
- Born: February 26, 1926; Mayfield, Kentucky, U.S.
- Died: February 19, 2013 (aged 86); Smyrna, Georgia, U.S.
- Batted: Right Threw: Right

MLB debut
- 1948, for the Kansas City Monarchs

Last MLB appearance
- 1948, for the Kansas City Monarchs

Teams
- Kansas City Monarchs (1948)

Wilker Mickey Stubblefield (February 26, 1926 – February 19, 2013) was an American Negro league baseball pitcher. He played one season in the Negro leagues in 1948, as a starting pitcher for the Kansas City Monarchs. He started 2 games for the Monarchs and completed both of them. His nickname was "The Mayfield Mounder."

A native of Mayfield, Kentucky, Stubblefield served in the US Navy during World War II. He was signed as a free agent to the Mayfield Clothiers of the Kentucky–Illinois–Tennessee League in 1952, and was the first "black" player signed to play in the league. Out of safety concerns, Mickey was only allowed to pitch in front of his hometown fans. Stubblefield was later drafted by the Pittsburgh Pirates after integration, but never made it to Major League Baseball.

Satchel Paige taught him how to throw his curveball.

== Sources ==
- Negro league baseball statistics and player information from Baseball Reference (Negro leagues)
