= Better Utilizing Investments to Leverage Development =

US federal infrastructure grant program

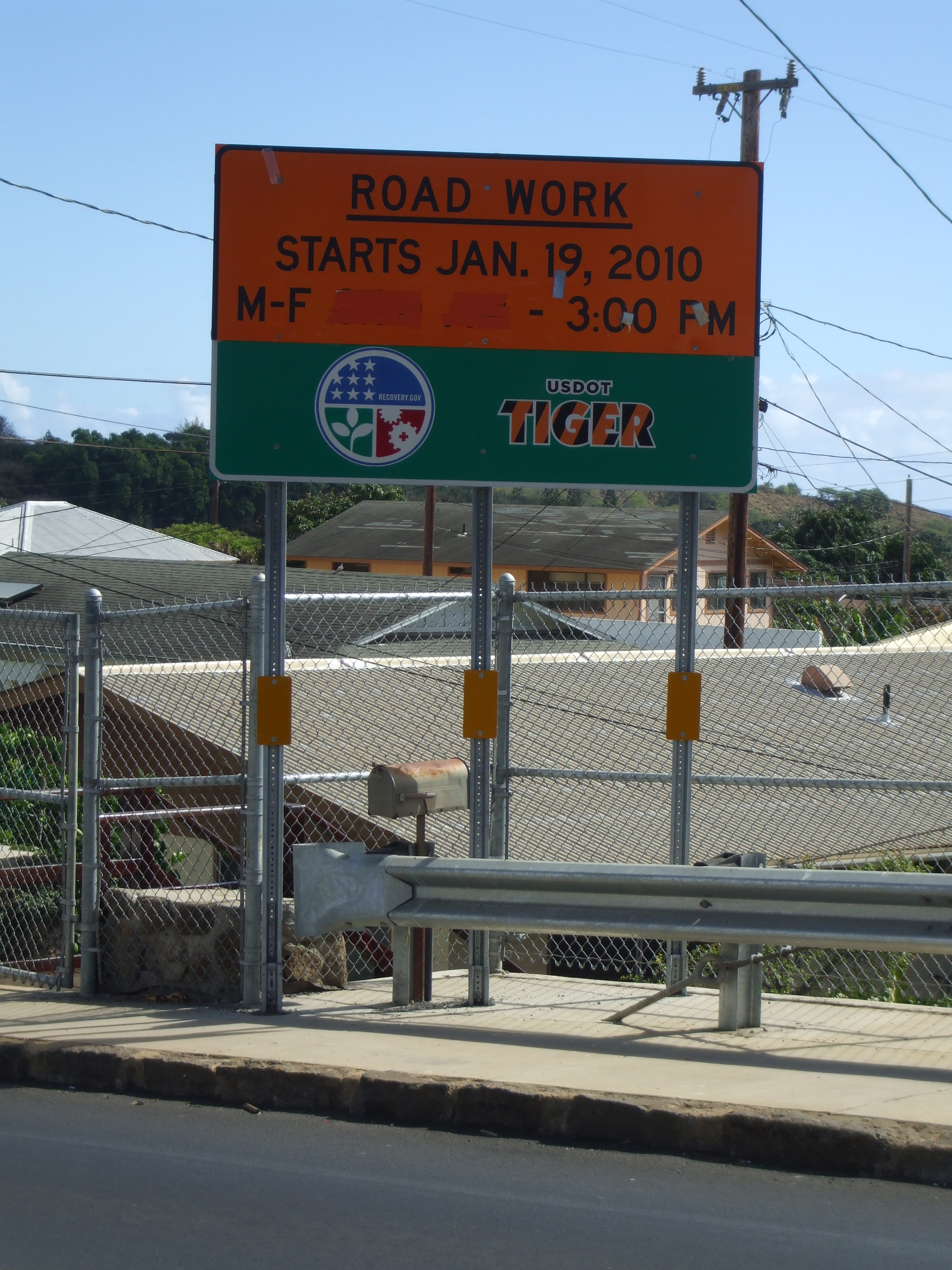
TIGER sign on North Market Street in Wailuku, Maui, Hawaii

Better Utilizing Investments to Leverage Development (BUILD) is an American federal government program administered by the United States Department of Transportation (US DOT). It began as supplementary discretionary grant program included in the American Recovery and Reinvestment Act of 2009. Initial legislation provided $1.5 billion for a National Surface Transportation System through September 30, 2011, "to be awarded on a competitive basis for capital investments in surface transportation projects". The program has been extended several times.

Originally named Transportation Investment Generating Economic Recovery (TIGER), it was renamed as Better Utilizing Investments to Leverage Development (BUILD) in 2018 before becoming Rebuilding American Infrastructure with Sustainability and Equity (RAISE) in 2021. In 2025, the name of the program reverted to BUILD.

== Requirements ==
The U.S. government designed TIGER grants in order to incentivize bettering environmental problems and reducing the United States' dependence on energy. On the economic front, the United States hopes infrastructure investment will encourage job creation, a pressing political priority; this would likely require the project to be shovel-ready.

=== Eligible applicants ===
Applicants eligible to receive funding for surface transportation projects include:

- State and local governments, including U.S. territories and regional tribal councils
- Transit agencies
- Port authorities
- Metropolitan planning organizations (MPOs)
- Multi-state or multi-jurisdictional applicants

=== Qualifications ===
Qualified projects should result in "desirable, long-term outcomes" for the United States, a state within, or a regional or metropolitan area. According to Title 23 of the United States Code, eligible projects could include improvements to interstate highways, reworking of interchanges, bridge replacements, earthquake-related improvements, relocating roads, upgrading rural collector roads, certain transit projects, passenger and freight rail transportation projects, and port infrastructure. Selected projects might improve the economy of the entire country, transportation safety, and quality of life for communities.

== Funding history ==
The annual grant programs from 2009 through 2017 were generally referred to as TIGER I, TIGER II, etc. though TIGER IX. The program was then renamed as BUILD for 2018, and renamed as RAISE for 2021.

=== TIGER (2009–2017) ===
U.S. Secretary of Transportation Ray LaHood announced the TIGER discretionary grants program on February 4, 2009. Lana T. Hurdle, deputy assistant secretary for budget and programs, and Joel Szabat, deputy assistant secretary for transportation policy, co-chaired the team responsible for selecting projects and monitoring spending. Out of nearly 1,400 applications who collectively submitted $60 billion in applications, the Department of Transportation was only able to award $1.5 billion in TIGER grant funds to a just 3% of applicants—51 innovative projects.

The U.S. Departments of Transportation and Housing and Urban Development, and Related Agencies Appropriations Act for 2010 made $600 million available for transportation infrastructure investment.

On June 30, 2011, Secretary LaHood announced that nearly $527 million would go towards the third round of TIGER fund disbursal. On December 15, 2011, that $511 million from the TIGER grant program would fund 46 transportation projects in 33 states and Puerto Rico.

In 2012, the fourth round of TIGER funding—close to $500 million—went to 47 transportation projects in 34 states and the District of Columbia. For fiscal year 2012, Democratic districts won projects that concern ports, multimodal transport, and freight rail transport; receiving 24% of total funds, rural areas also performed strongly.

Although federal funding no longer referred to the funding allocations as TIGER grants, the US DOT continued to allocate these funds according to the same formula and continued to use the TIGER name. In 2013, 51 projects received TIGER funds, totaling approximately $458.3 million.

In 2014, the US Congress appropriated $600 million for TIGER funds. The US DOT received 797 applications requesting more than $9.5 billion. Seventy-two capital and planning projects in 46 states and the District of Columbia were selected for funding that totaled more than $584 million.

In 2015, the seventh round of TIGER grants generated 625 applications requesting $9.8 billion worth of projects; of those projects, 60 were road projects, 18 percent were transit projects, and eight percent were rail projects, and port and bicycle and pedestrian projects made up six percent of the total.

In 2016, the eighth round of grants awarded 40 capital projects to 32 states plus two American territories.

In 2017, the ninth round of grants awarded 41 capital projects to 43 states.

=== BUILD (2018–2020) ===
The program used the BUILD name for three years, awarding 91 capital projects in 49 states plus the District of Columbia in 2018, 55 capital projects across 35 states in 2019, and 70 projects across 44 states in 2020.

=== RAISE (2021–2024) ===
The program was renamed RAISE in 2021. It awarded 90 projects across 47 states plus the District of Columbia and Guam in 2021, 166 projects across 50 states and various territories in 2022, and 162 projects across 50 states and various territories in 2023. In 2023, the program received $2.2 billion in federal funding.

=== BUILD (2025–present) ===
The program's name was restored to BUILD early in 2025.
