= Mayfield High School (Kentucky) =

Coordinates: 36.72997°N 88.62843°W

Location
- 700 Douthitt Street; Mayfield, KY 42066

Information
- School type: Public
- Motto: Pride, Tradition, Excellence
- Founded: 1908
- School district: Mayfield Independent School District
- Superintendent: Joe Henderson
- Principal: Billy Edwards
- Grades: 9–12
- Enrollment: 457 (2016-17)
- Campus: Small city
- Colors: Red and black
- Athletics: Football, basketball, soccer, baseball, softball, track, tennis, golf, cheerleading, volleyball, marching band
- Nickname: Cardinals
- Rival: Paducah Tilghman High School, Graves County High School
- Feeder schools: Mayfield Middle School
- Website: mayfield-mhs.edlioschool.com

Mayfield High School is a public secondary school in Mayfield, Kentucky, and is the only high school of the Mayfield Independent School District.

== History ==
Mayfield Independent City School District was established on July 1, 1908, with the selection and meeting of its first board members, organized by Mr. W.J. Webb. The first official school year as an independent school district was the 1908–1909 school year. The original location of Mayfield High School was on West Walnut Street School which opened in September 1908, and in 1909 the high school moved to the old West Kentucky College Building.

A new stadium was built behind the high school and dedicated on November 6, 1925, at the Madisonville/Mayfield Game. Up to this point, games were played at Cyclone Park, which was in the far north corner of what was Maplewood Cemetery.

In 1966, Dunbar High School, the school for black students in the Mayfield area, was closed and the students enrolled in Mayfield High School by court order. Mayfield High School moved to its current building in 1974.

The school was used as a safe shelter for survivors during the 2021 tornado, which destroyed much of Mayfield.

== Athletics ==
Mayfield High School has won 13 KHSAA football championships (1977, 1978, 1985, 1986, 1993, 1995, 2002, 2010, 2012, 2013, 2014, 2015, and 2023).

Mayfield has been State Runner up 13 times (1976, 1987, 1989, 1991, 1992, 1998, 2005, 2009, 2011, 2017, 2018, 2019, and 2022), and has an additional 16 appearances in the State Final Four (1967, 1969, 1981, 1983, 1984, 1988, 1990, 1994, 1996, 2000, 2001, 2003, 2004, 2006, 2016, 2021).

Mayfield has not had a losing season since 1963.

Mayfield has a State best in both District Championships (41), and Regional Championships (42).

Following the 2023 season, Mayfield is second in the state in all-time football victories with 946. Only Male has more victories. 946 wins is also good for 4th most wins nationwide.

The football rivalry between Mayfield and Paducah Tilghman began in 1911 and is the second oldest rivalry in the state of Kentucky.
