= National Register of Historic Places listings in Caldwell County, Kentucky =

Location of Caldwell County in Kentucky

This is a list of the National Register of Historic Places listings in Caldwell County, Kentucky.

It is intended to be a complete list of the properties and districts on the National Register of Historic Places in Caldwell County, Kentucky, United States. The locations of National Register properties and districts for which the latitude and longitude coordinates are included below, may be seen in a map.

There are 10 properties and districts listed on the National Register in the county. Another property was once listed but has been removed.

This National Park Service list is complete through NPS recent listings posted December 12, 2025.

== Current listings ==
	Name on the Register	Image	Date listed	Location	City or town	Description
1	Adsmore	Adsmore	October 25, 1973 (#73000793)	304 N. Jefferson St. 37°06′37″N 87°52′49″W	Princeton	
2	Champion-Shepherdson House	Champion-Shepherdson House	December 28, 1978 (#78003411)	115 E. Main St. 37°06′31″N 87°52′52″W	Princeton	
3	Confederate Soldier Monument in Caldwell	Confederate Soldier Monument in Caldwell	July 17, 1997 (#97000712)	Junction of Kentucky Route 91 and N. Jefferson St. 37°06′32″N 87°52′55″W	Princeton	
4	Fredonia Cumberland Presbyterian Church	Fredonia Cumberland Presbyterian Church	August 8, 1985 (#85001746)	U.S. Route 641; 37°12′37″N 88°03′32″W	Fredonia	
5	Halleck's Chapel and Halleck's School	Halleck's Chapel and Halleck's School	August 2, 2001 (#01000802)	0.5 miles north of the junction of Kentucky Route 293 and Caldwell Chapel Rd. 37°04′26″N 87°57′43″W	Princeton	Building has fallen.
6	Knott House	Knott House	October 13, 1999 (#97001238)	302 Nichols St. 37°06′06″N 87°52′39″W	Princeton	
7	L.B. Overby House	L.B. Overby House	March 22, 1990 (#90000476)	317 S. Jefferson St. 37°06′19″N 87°53′02″W	Princeton	
8	William S. Powell House	William S. Powell House	May 26, 1995 (#95000641)	501 Washington St. 37°06′34″N 87°53′16″W	Princeton	
9	Princeton Downtown Commercial District	Princeton Downtown Commercial District	September 19, 1988 (#88001017)	Roughly along Main St., E. and W. Court Sq. Sts. 37°06′31″N 87°52′56″W	Princeton	
9	State Road-Hill Cemetery Segment		June 26, 2020 (#100005312)	Adjacent to Hill Cemetery at the end of Hill Cemetery Rd. 37°11′05″N 88°01′28″W	Fredonia vicinity	

== Former listing ==
	Name on the Register	Image	Date listed	Date removed	Location	City or town	Description
1	Flournoy-Henry House		July 19, 1976 (#76000854)	February 5, 1991	221 E. Main St.	Princeton	

== See also ==
- List of National Historic Landmarks in Kentucky
- National Register of Historic Places listings in Kentucky
