= Rodney H. Mabry =

Academic

Rod Mabry
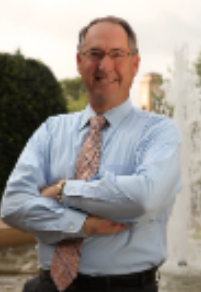
- Born: 1947; Princeton, Kentucky, United States
- Education: Un University of Kentucky, B.S., University of North Carolina—Chapel Hill, Ph.D.
- Occupation: Academic
- Title: President Emeritus The University of Texas at Tyler

Rod Mabry is an American academic most well known for being the third president of The University of Texas at Tyler for 18 years until his retirement in 2016. Previously, he was the dean of the College of Business Administration at the University of Tulsa. Dr. Mabry is also known for the creation of the New Millennium Vision, a 10-year strategic plan for UT Tyler to become a major university. During his time as president, student enrollment increased to nearly 10,000 students. In 2017, Mabry received the East Texas Area Council of Boy Scouts Distinguished Citizen Good Turn Award.

== Education ==
Mabry earned a bachelor's degree in commerce from the University of Kentucky and a Ph.D. in economics from the University of North Carolina at Chapel Hill. He also received a College Management Certificate from Carnegie Mellon University.

== Career ==
Mabry researches and writes on a variety of public policy issues – from costs of the U.S. judicial system and banking issues to state and local government tax and finance questions. He has co-authored a textbook on economics and written more than fifty articles that have appeared in numerous academic journals – such as the Journal of Finance, Journal of Financial Research, and the Commercial Investment Journal. He has received grants for research and other projects from such entities as the National Science Foundation, U. S. Department of Justice, Princeton's Woodrow Wilson School and various state legislatures.

Mabry has also served in leadership roles and faculty member at Clemson University and Northeast Louisiana University, and as a Field Research Associate for the Brookings Institution in Washington.

Mabry was voted President Emeritus by UT System Board of Regents in 2020.
