= Princeton Downtown Commercial District =

Historic district in Kentucky, United States

- U.S. National Register of Historic Places
- U.S. Historic district
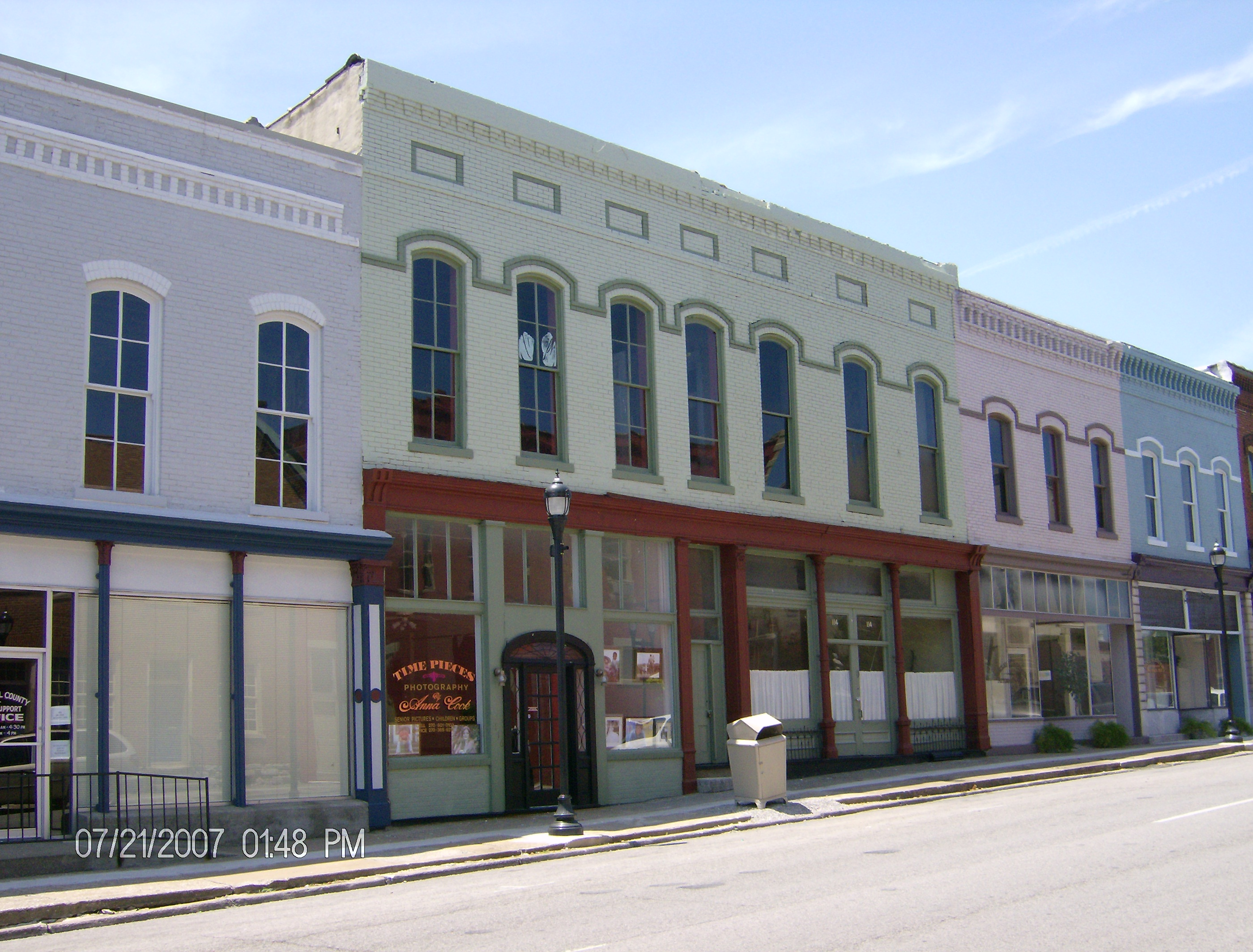
- 114-116 East Main Street

- Location within Kentucky Location within the United States
- Location: Roughly along Main St., E. and W. Court Sq. Sts., Princeton, Kentucky
- Coordinates: 37°6′31″N 87°52′56″W
- Architect: Smith, G. Tandy; Et al.
- Architectural style: Late 19th And Early 20th Century American Movements, Late 19th And 20th Century Revivals, Late Victorian
- NRHP reference No.: 88001017
- Added to NRHP: September 19, 1988

Princeton Downtown Commercial District is a historic district in downtown Princeton, Kentucky centered on the 1940s art deco courthouse. The district includes 44 contributing resources: 42 buildings, Big Spring Park, and the Confederate Soldier Monument. Most resources are located along East and West Main Street, East and West Court Square Street, and the adjacent buildings on West Market Street, South Harrison, West Washington, and South Jefferson. Most of the buildings are one or two-story brick structures built from the 1870s to the 1930s.

The downtown district was added to the National Register of Historic Places in 1988 because of the historic architecture and historical significance to the area. As of early 2007, this district of Princeton is participating in the Renaissance Kentucky/Main Street program.

These resources are also individually listed on the National Register of Historic Places:

- Confederate Soldier Monument in the courthouse square
- Champion-Shepherdson Building at 115 East Main Street, the oldest building in Princeton

== Photographs ==
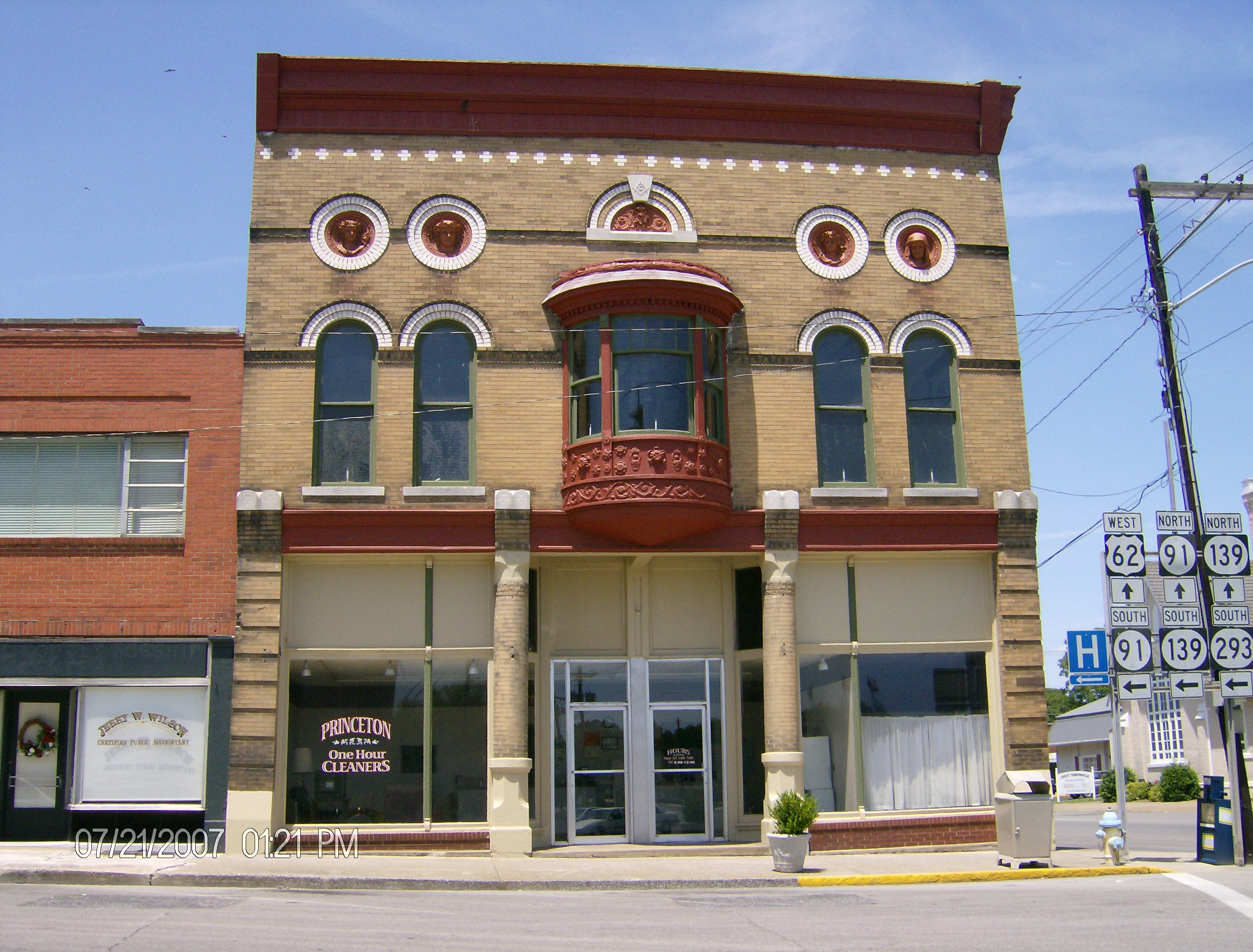
Former Masonic Lodge at West Court Square.

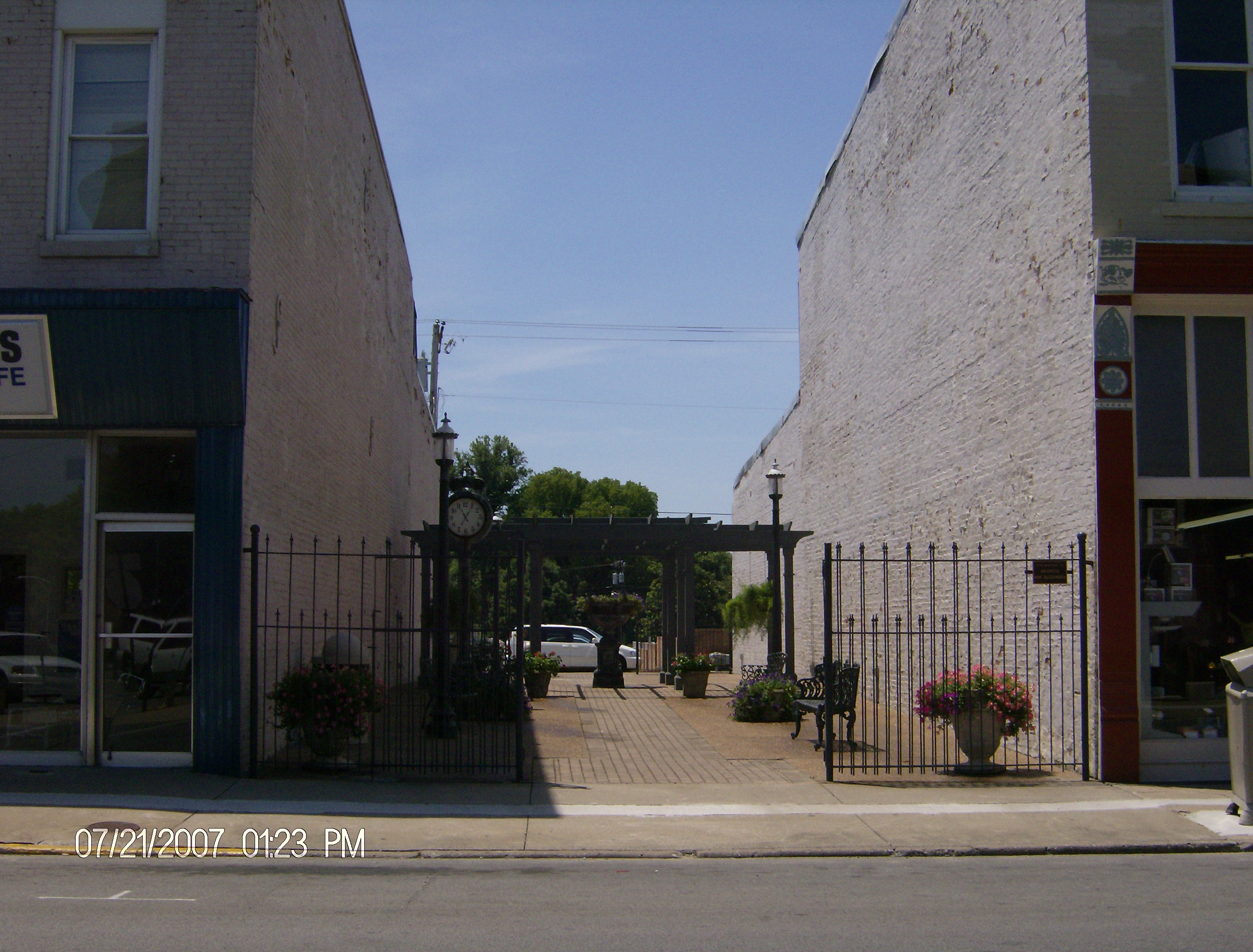
Olszewska Park, formerly First Bank and Trust, on West Main Street.

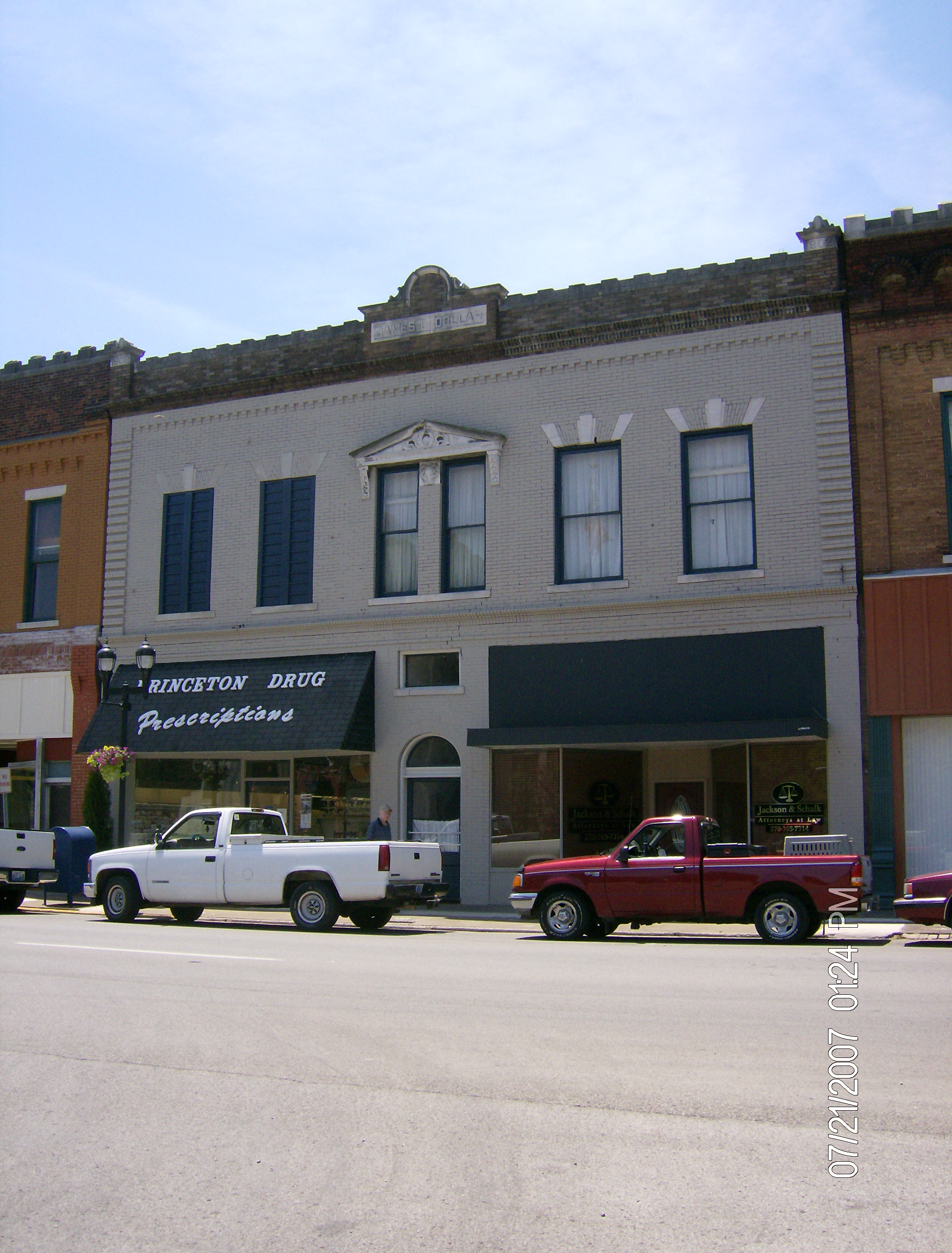
The James Dollar Building at 103-105 West Main Street.

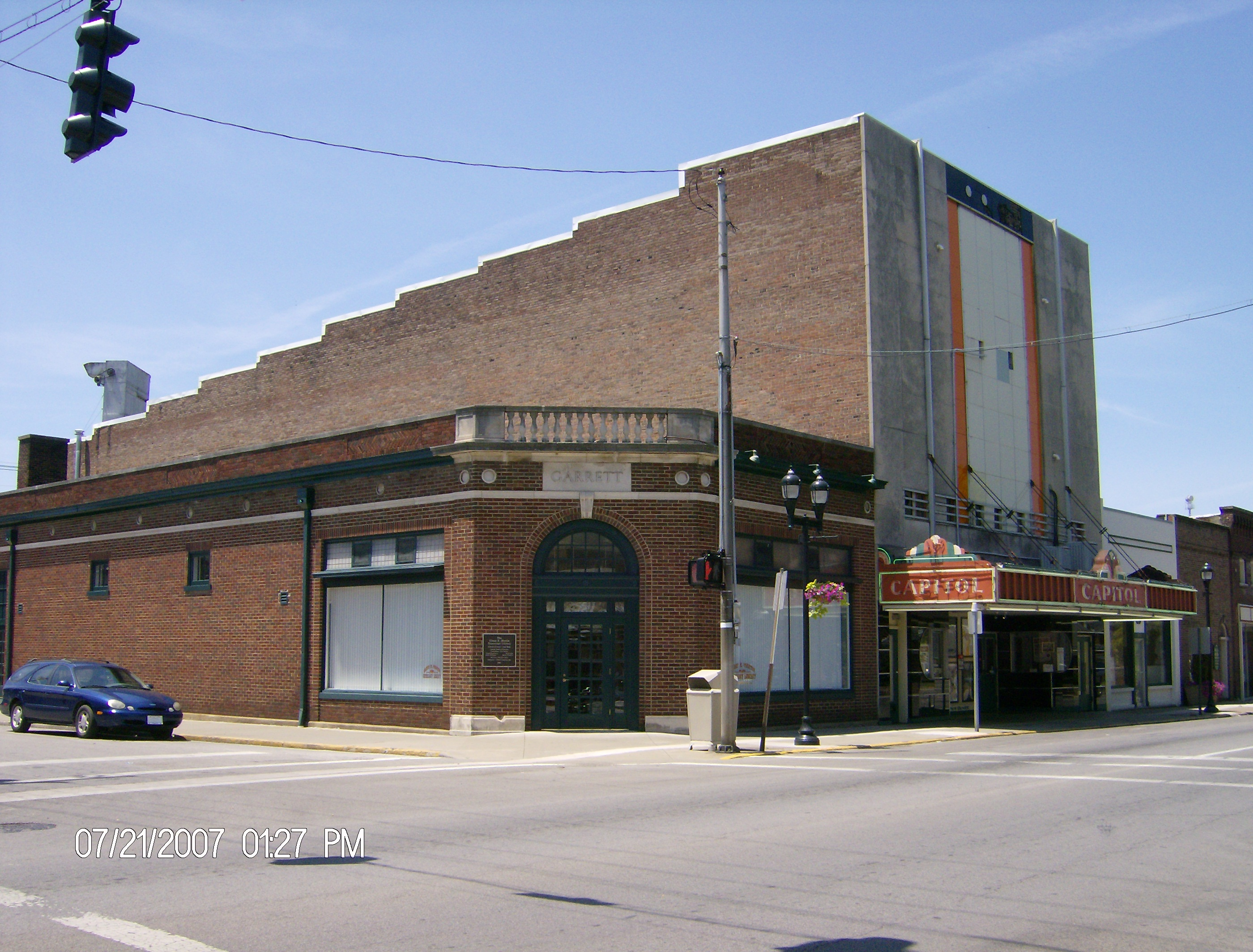
The Garrett Building at 201 West Main Street.
