= Confederate Soldier Monument in Princeton =

- U.S. National Register of Historic Places
- U.S. Historic district – Contributing property
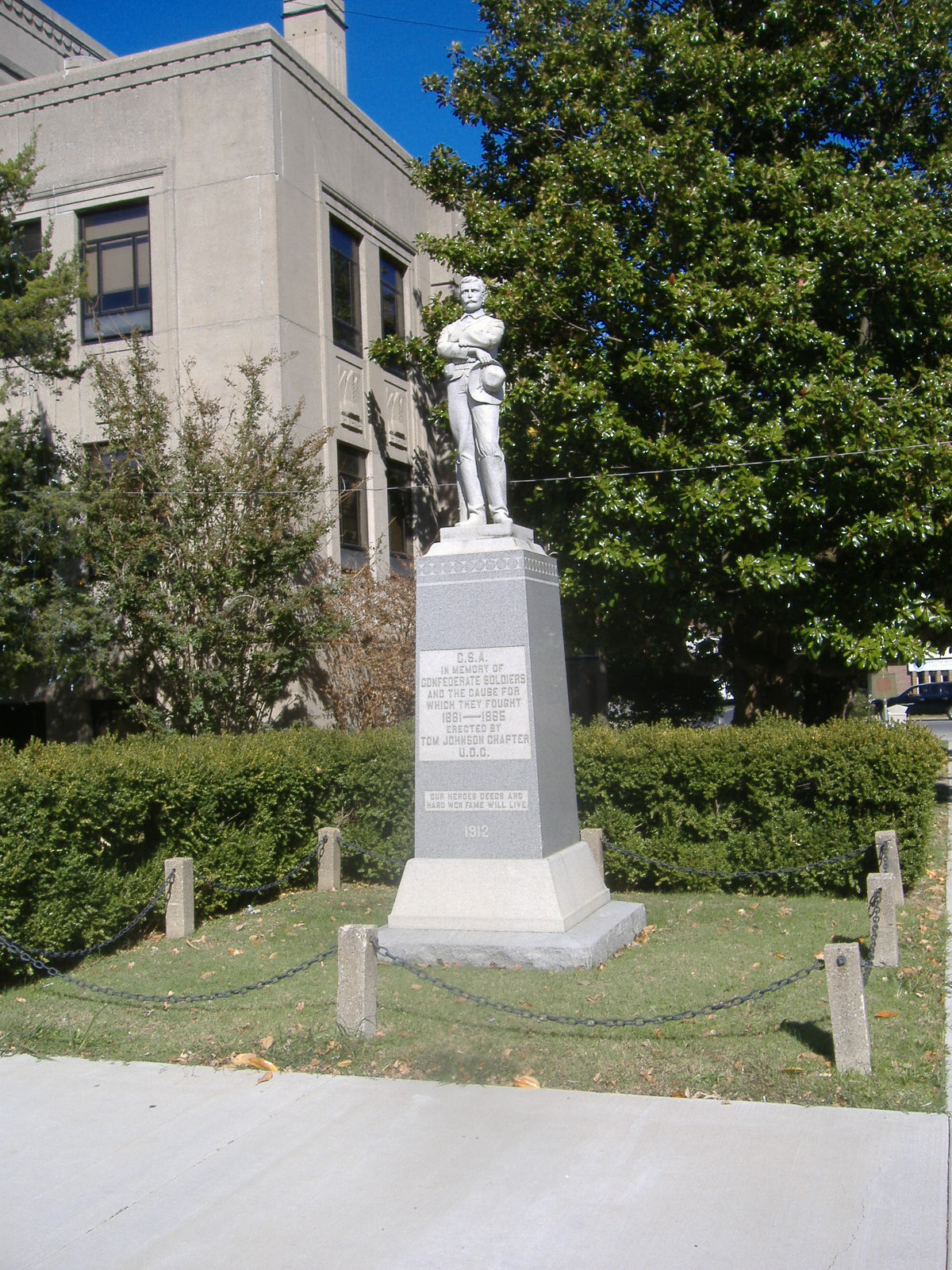

- Location within Kentucky Location within the United States
- Location: Courthouse lawn, Princeton, Kentucky
- Built: 1912
- Part of: Princeton Downtown Commercial District (ID88001017)
- MPS: Civil War Monuments of Kentucky MPS
- NRHP reference No.: 97000712

Significant dates
- Added to NRHP: July 17, 1997
- Designated CP: September 19, 1988

The Confederate Soldier Monument in Princeton, Caldwell County, Kentucky is a historic statue located on the Caldwell County Courthouse south lawn in the county seat of Princeton, Kentucky, United States. It was erected in 1912 by the Tom Johnson Chapter No. 886 of the United Daughters of the Confederacy (UDC).

The entire 15-foot-tall (4.6 m) monument is made of granite; mostly gray granite, but with some white granite. The southward-facing statue has been said to be "defiant", with its back to the North, its defiant gaze, and its proud mustache.

The monument was constructed by John Davis and Sons Marble and Granite Works of Princeton, Kentucky, at a cost of approximately US$10,000 (equivalent to $333,621 in 2025) raised privately by the Tom Johnson UDC chapter and surviving local Confederate veterans.

The statue's inscription reads "C.S.A. / IN MEMORY OF / CONFEDERATE SOLDIERS / AND THE CAUSE FOR / WHICH THEY FOUGHT / 1861-1865 / ERECTED BY / TOM JOHNSON CHAPTER / U.D.C." "OUR HEROES DEEDS AND / HARD WON FAME WILL LIVE." "1912" A Confederate battle flag is engraved on the left side of the statue's base.

It was dedicated to a large crowd including surviving local Confederate veterans of Jim Pearce Camp No. 527, United Confederate Veterans, on November 12, 1912. Many businesses in Princeton closed for the ceremony.

On July 17, 1997, the Confederate Soldier Monument of Princeton was one of sixty-one different monuments related to the Civil War in Kentucky placed on the National Register of Historic Places, as part of the Civil War Monuments of Kentucky Multiple Property Submission.

The monument is still located outside the courthouse.
