= Fredonia, Kentucky =

- City
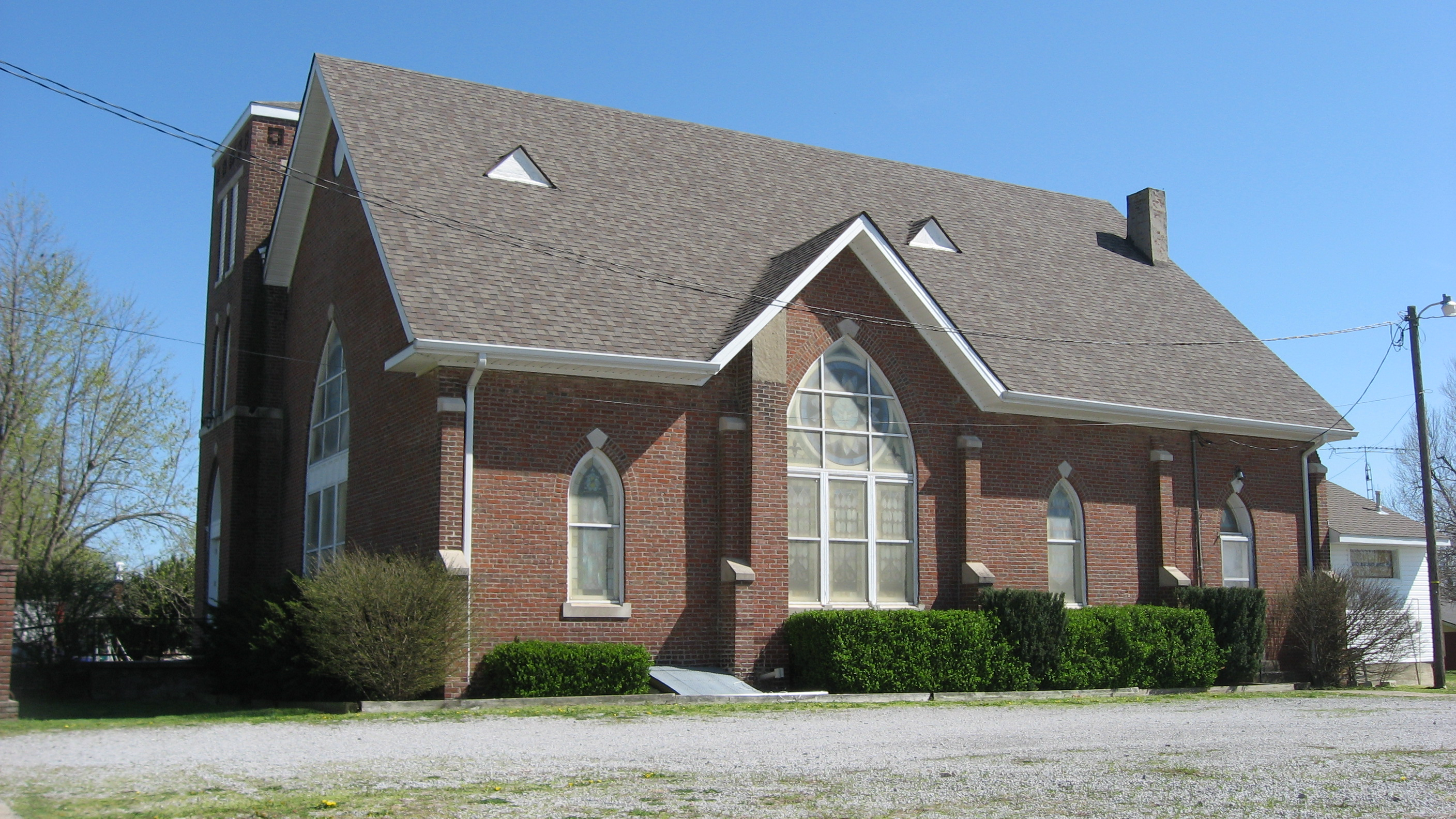
- Unity Baptist Church

- Location of Fredonia in Caldwell County, Kentucky.
- Coordinates: 37°12′33″N 88°3′32″W
- Country: United States
- State: Kentucky
- County: Caldwell

Area
  - Total: 0.62 sq mi (1.61 km^{2})
  - Land: 0.62 sq mi (1.61 km^{2})
  - Water: 0 sq mi (0.00 km^{2})
- Elevation: 430 ft (130 m)

Population (2020)
  - Total: 372
  - Density: 599.0/sq mi (231.27/km^{2})
- Time zone: UTC-6 (Central (CST))
  - Summer (DST): UTC-5 (CDT)
- ZIP code: 42411
- Area codes: 270 & 364
- FIPS code: 21-29080
- GNIS feature ID: 0492485

Fredonia (/frɪˈdoʊniə/) is a home rule-class city in Caldwell County, Kentucky, in the United States. As of the 2020 census, Fredonia had a population of 372.

== Geography ==
Fredonia is located in western Caldwell County at 37°12′33″N 88°3′32″W (37.209111, -88.058850). U.S. Route 641 passes through the town, leading north 9 miles (14 km) to Marion and south 9 miles (14 km) to Eddyville near Interstates 24 and 69. Ky. 91 connects Fredonia to the county seat of Princeton 19 miles (31 km) to the southeast.

According to the United States Census Bureau, the city has a total area of 0.62 square miles (1.6 km^{2}), all land.

== History ==
The village is said to have been laid out in 1836. The name "Fredonia" was a popular one in America in the early 19th century after its use was popularized by Samuel L. Mitchill of New York, but local tradition holds that the Kentucky town was named for the daughter of town founder Harvey W. Bigham. It was formally incorporated by the state assembly in 1869.

== Demographics ==
Historical population
Census	Pop.	Note	%±
1870	155		—
1880	191		23.2%
1890	249		30.4%
1900	196		−21.3%
1910	421		114.8%
1920	477		13.3%
1930	517		8.4%
1940	446		−13.7%
1950	395		−11.4%
1960	427		8.1%
1970	450		5.4%
1980	535		18.9%
1990	490		−8.4%
2000	420		−14.3%
2010	401		−4.5%
2020	372		−7.2%
U.S. Decennial Census

As of the census of 2000, there were 420 people, 177 households, and 132 families residing in the city. The population density was 642.5 inhabitants per square mile (248.1/km^{2}). There were 206 housing units at an average density of 315.1 per square mile (121.7/km^{2}). The racial makeup of the city was 96.19% White, 3.57% African American, and 0.24% from two or more races. Hispanic or Latino of any race were 0.48% of the population.

There were 177 households, out of which 28.8% had children under the age of 18 living with them, 62.1% were married couples living together, 10.2% had a female householder with no husband present, and 25.4% were non-families. 24.9% of all households were made up of individuals, and 13.0% had someone living alone who was 65 years of age or older. The average household size was 2.37 and the average family size was 2.80.

In the city, the population was spread out, with 21.4% under the age of 18, 6.4% from 18 to 24, 31.2% from 25 to 44, 24.3% from 45 to 64, and 16.7% who were 65 years of age or older. The median age was 39 years. For every 100 females, there were 94.4 males. For every 100 females age 18 and over, there were 90.8 males.

The median income for a household in the city was $35,893, and the median income for a family was $41,250. Males had a median income of $35,000 versus $21,429 for females. The per capita income for the city was $14,865. About 9.2% of families and 13.0% of the population were below the poverty line, including 19.4% of those under age 18 and 9.7% of those age 65 or over.
