= L.B. Overby House =

Historic house in Kentucky, United States

- L. B. Overby House
- U.S. National Register of Historic Places
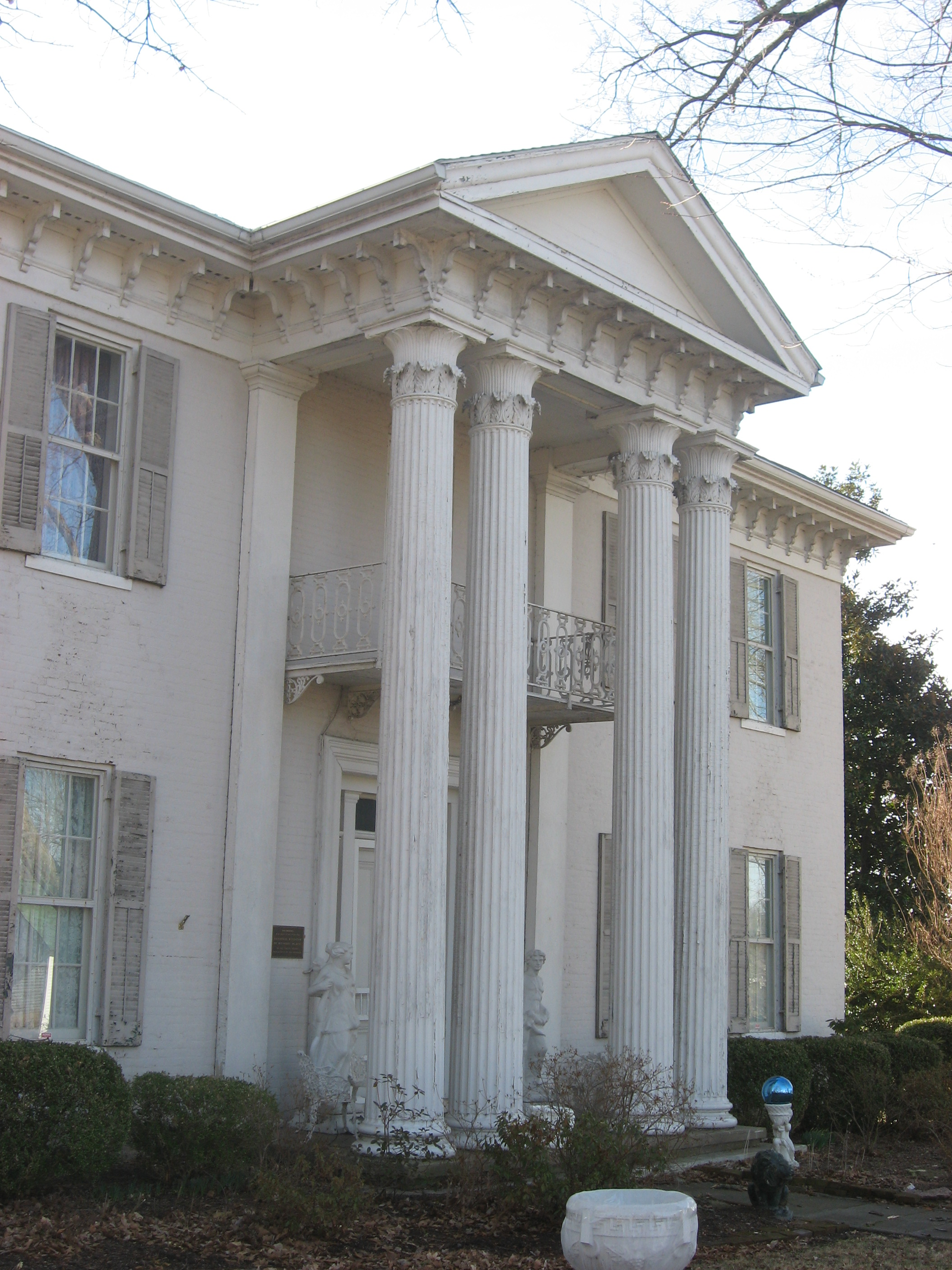

- Location within Kentucky Location within the United States
- Location: 317 S. Jefferson St., Princeton, Kentucky
- Coordinates: 37°06′19″N 87°53′02″W
- Area: 1.1 acres (0.45 ha)
- Built: 1857
- Architectural style: Greek Revival
- NRHP reference No.: 90000476
- Added to NRHP: March 22, 1990

The L.B. Overby House, located at 317 S. Jefferson St. in Princeton, Kentucky, was built in 1857. It was listed on the National Register of Historic Places in 1990.

The listing included three contributing buildings and a contributing site.
