= Adsmore =

Historic house in Kentucky, United States

- U.S. National Register of Historic Places
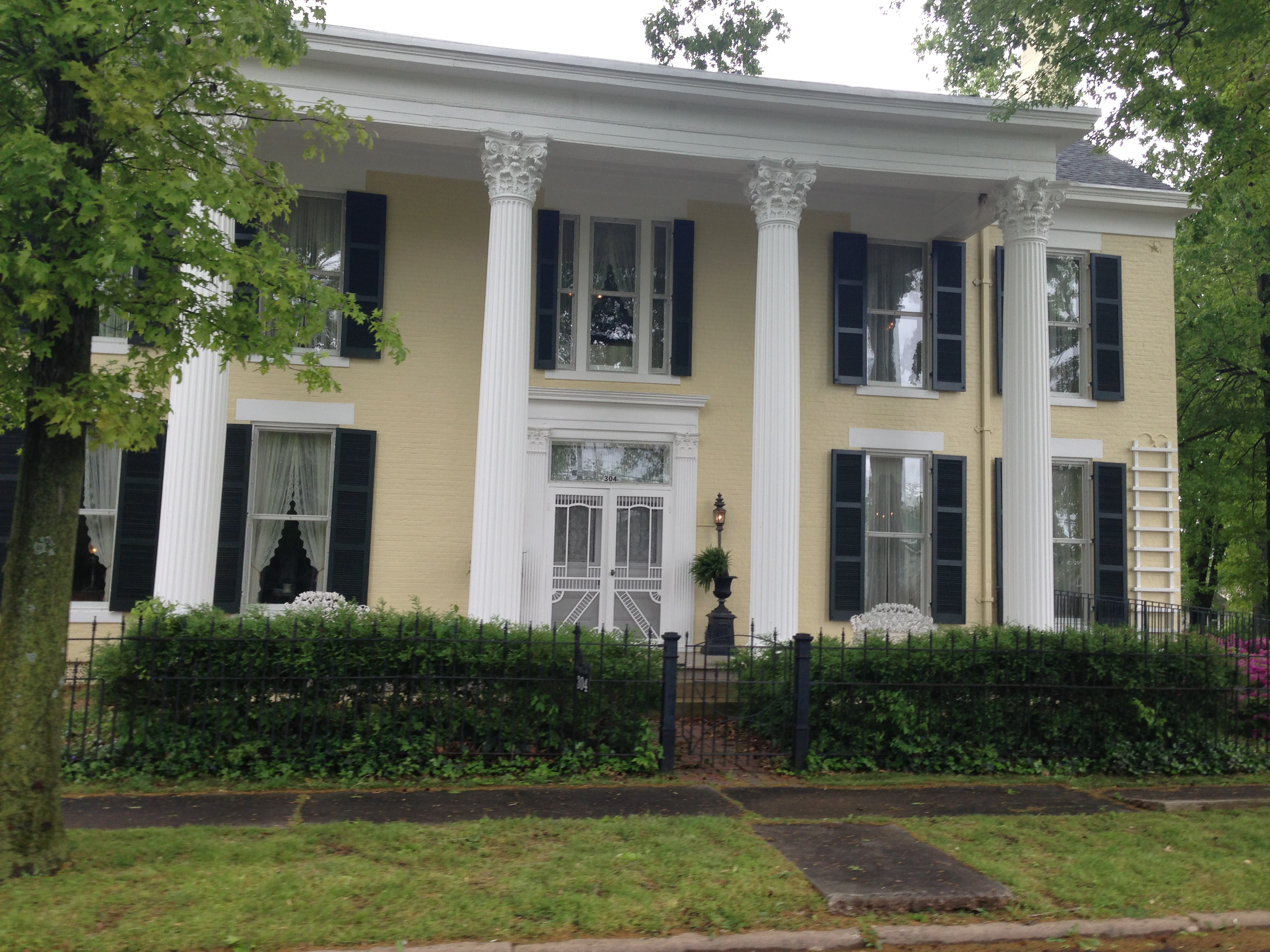

- Location within Kentucky Location within the United States
- Location: 304 N. Jefferson St., Princeton, Kentucky
- Coordinates: 37°6′37″N 87°52′49″W
- Area: 3 acres (1.2 ha)
- Built: 1859
- Architectural style: Greek Revival
- NRHP reference No.: 73000793
- Added to NRHP: October 25, 1973

Adsmore is a living history museum located on North Jefferson Street in Princeton, Kentucky. It is the only living home museum in Kentucky. Its name is believed to be derived from numerous additions and renovations over 150 years.

== History ==
Adsmore was originally constructed as the Greek Revival-style residence of dry goods merchant John Higgins in 1857. James B. Hewitt owned the residence from about 1870 until 1900. At that time, it was sold to John Parker Smith, of the prominent Smith-Garrett family, who employed Brinton B. Davis to enlarge it in his noted Colonial Revival style. The house passed to Smith's daughter, Mayme (Smith) Garrett, on his death. Garrett's daughter, Katharine Garrett, inherited Adsmore and made it her home until her death in September 1984. She bequeathed the Adsmore estate to the trustees of the George Coon Public Library. Her will stipulated that all of its elaborate furnishings be restored and that the house be maintained as a public museum. Along with the residence, plus an endowment for the operation of a museum.

== Museum ==
Adsmore was added to the National Register of Historic Places and in 1973. It opened as a museum in 1986.

The grounds of Adsmore contain the house structure, the carriage house that now serves as a gift shop, and a log cabin. The Adsmore House and Museum conducts tours Thursday, Friday and Saturday and for special events such as the Black Patch Festival. The tour's content and the furnishings and decor change for the different "seasons" depicted in the house.

== Gallery ==
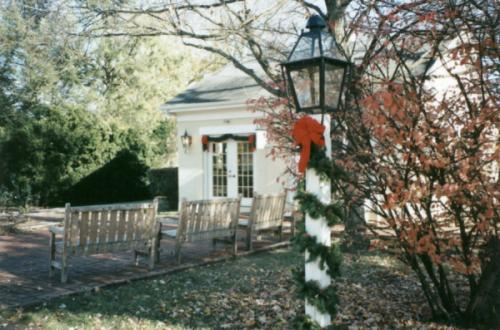
The Adsmore carriage house in autumn.

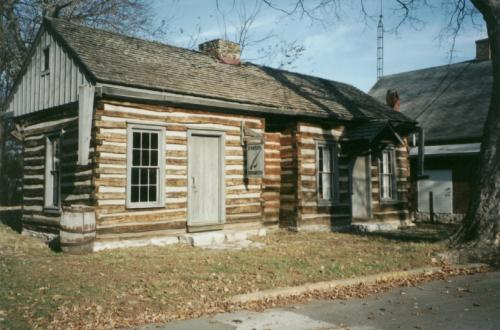
The log cabin.

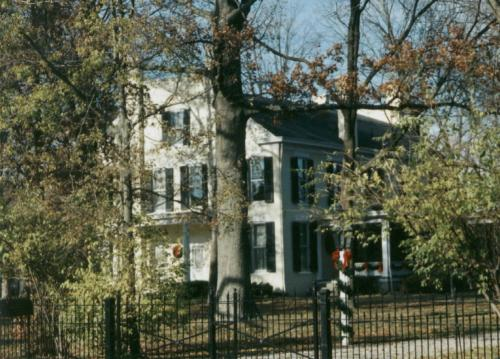
The Adsmore House Museum.

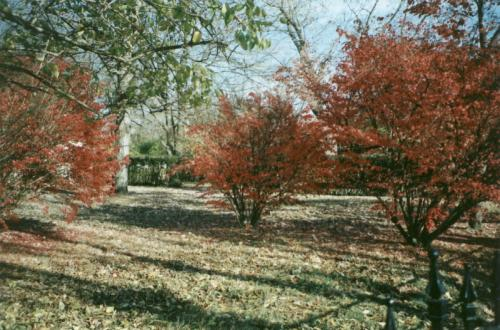
The grounds of Adsmore Museum.

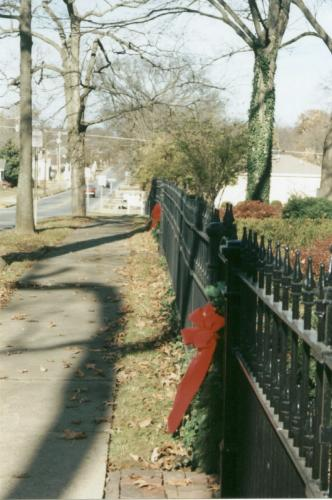
Wrought iron fences encircle Adsmore.
