= Fredonia Cumberland Presbyterian Church =

Historic church in Kentucky, United States

- U.S. National Register of Historic Places
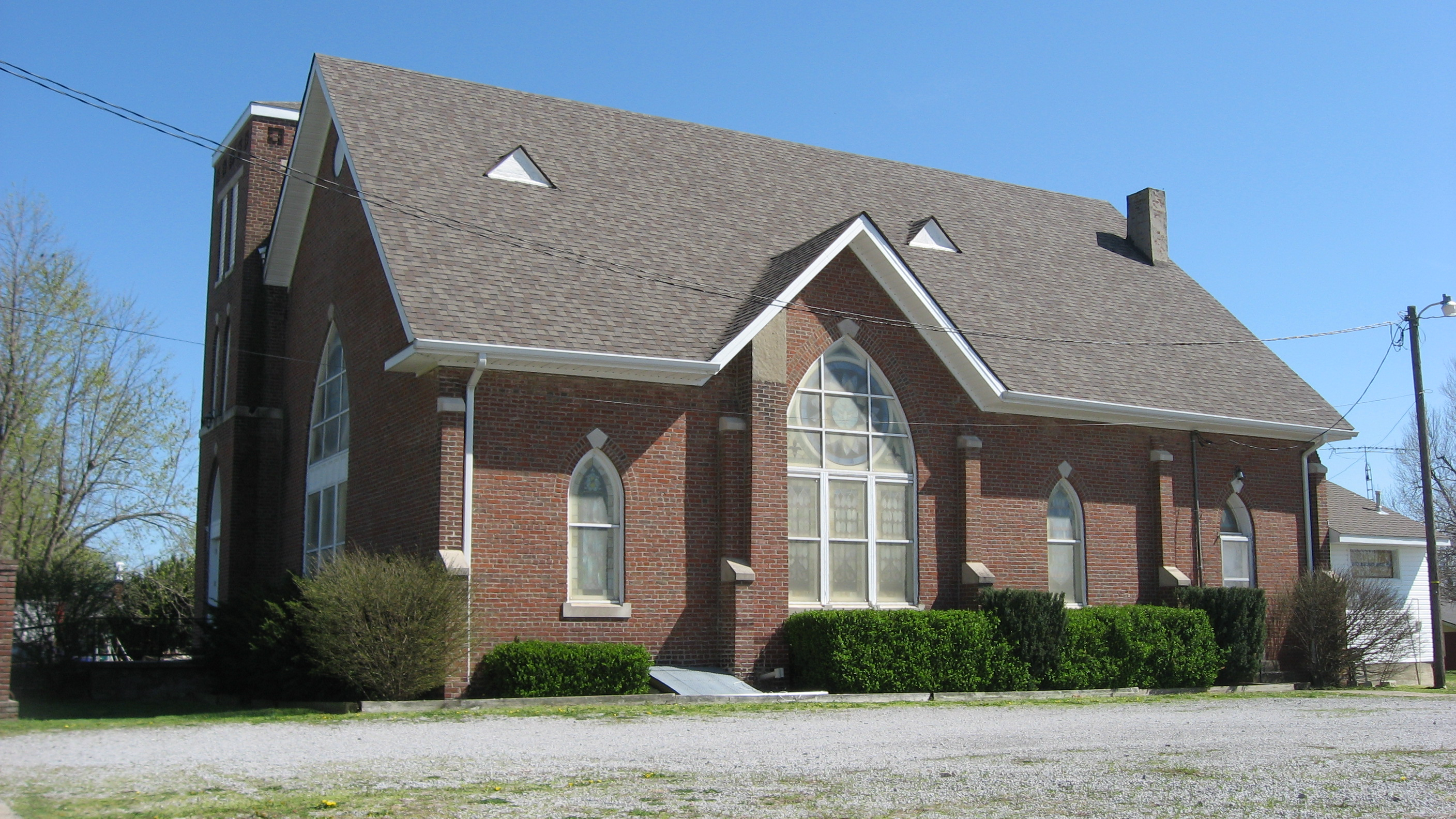
- Western side and front

- Location within Kentucky Location within the United States
- Location: US 641, Fredonia, Kentucky
- Coordinates: 37°12′36″N 88°3′30″W
- Area: less than one acre
- Built: 1892
- Architectural style: Gothic
- NRHP reference No.: 85001746
- Added to NRHP: August 8, 1985

The Fredonia Cumberland Presbyterian Church, in Fredonia, Kentucky, also known as Unity Missionary Baptist Church, is a historic church on U.S. Highway 641. It was built in 1892 and added to the National Register of Historic Places in 1985.

It is described as "a straightforward, well-executed version of Victorian Gothic architecture used in the construction of many Protestant churches in Kentucky during the late 19th century."

It is a cruciform-plan church which has a square bell tower. It originally had a cupola, but that was destroyed by lightning in 1925 and was not replaced.

== See also ==
- National Register of Historic Places listings in Kentucky
