= Princeton, Kentucky =

- City
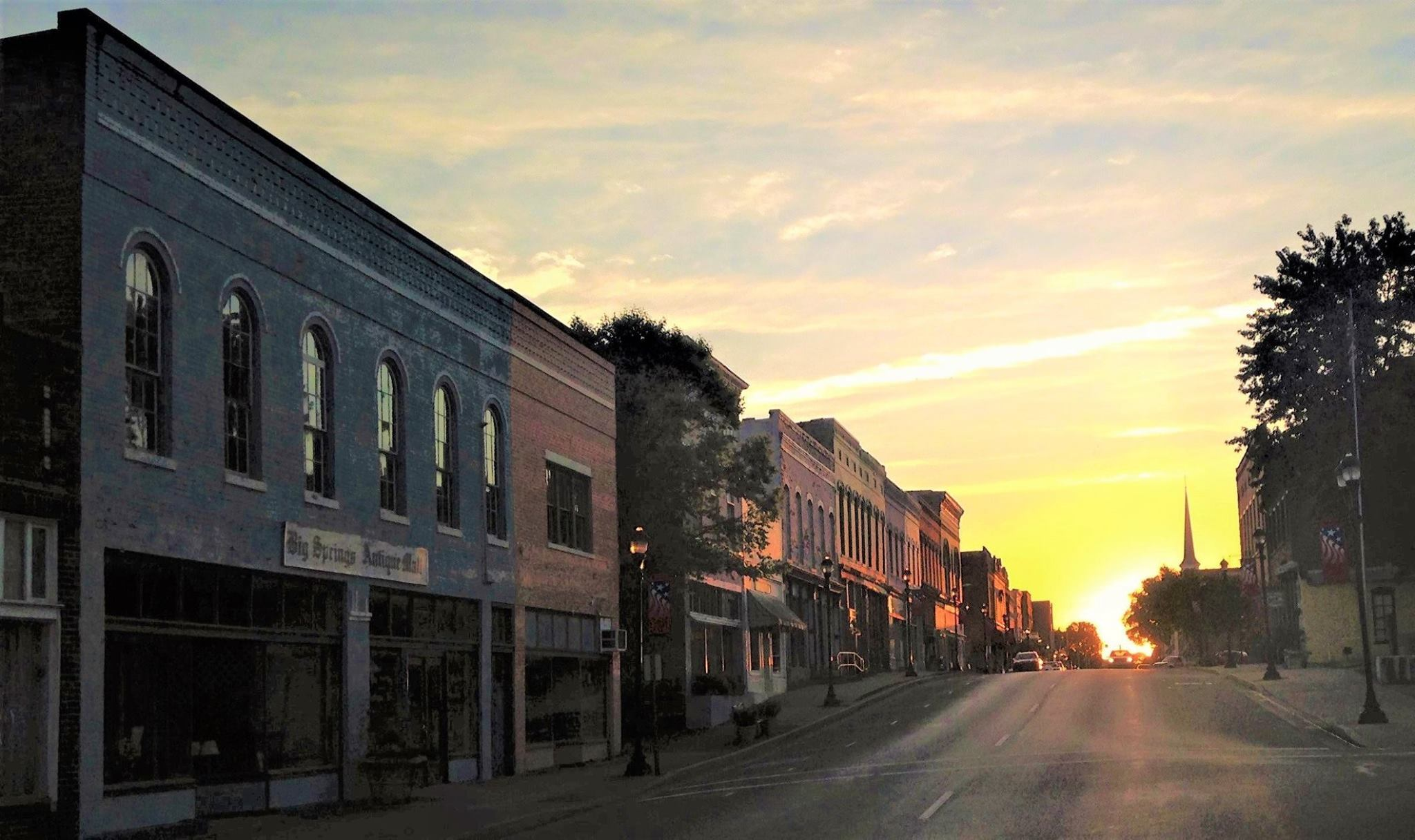
- Downtown Princeton, Kentucky

- Location of Princeton in Caldwell County, Kentucky.
- Coordinates: 37°6′28″N 87°52′57″W
- Country: United States
- State: Kentucky
- County: Caldwell
- Established: December 6, 1820
- Incorporated: 1854
- Named after: William Prince, a local landowner

Government
  - Type: Mayor-Council
  - Mayor: Brock Thomas

Area
  - Total: 9.01 sq mi (23.33 km^{2})
  - Land: 8.98 sq mi (23.27 km^{2})
  - Water: 0.023 sq mi (0.06 km^{2})
- Elevation: 482 ft (147 m)

Population (2020)
  - Total: 6,270
  - Estimate (2022): 6,210
  - Density: 697.8/sq mi (269.41/km^{2})
- Demonym: Princetonian
- Time zone: UTC-6 (Central (CST))
  - Summer (DST): UTC-5 (CDT)
- ZIP code: 42445
- Area codes: 270, 364
- FIPS code: 21-63138
- GNIS feature ID: 0501350
- Website: www.princetonky.us

Princeton is a home rule-class city in Caldwell County, Kentucky, in the United States. It is the seat of its county. As of the 2020 census, Princeton had a population of 6,270. Princeton is home to several notable attractions such as Adsmore Museum, Champion-Shepherdson House (home of the Princeton Art Guild), University of Kentucky Research and Education Center Botanical Garden, and the Annual Black Patch Festival.

== History ==
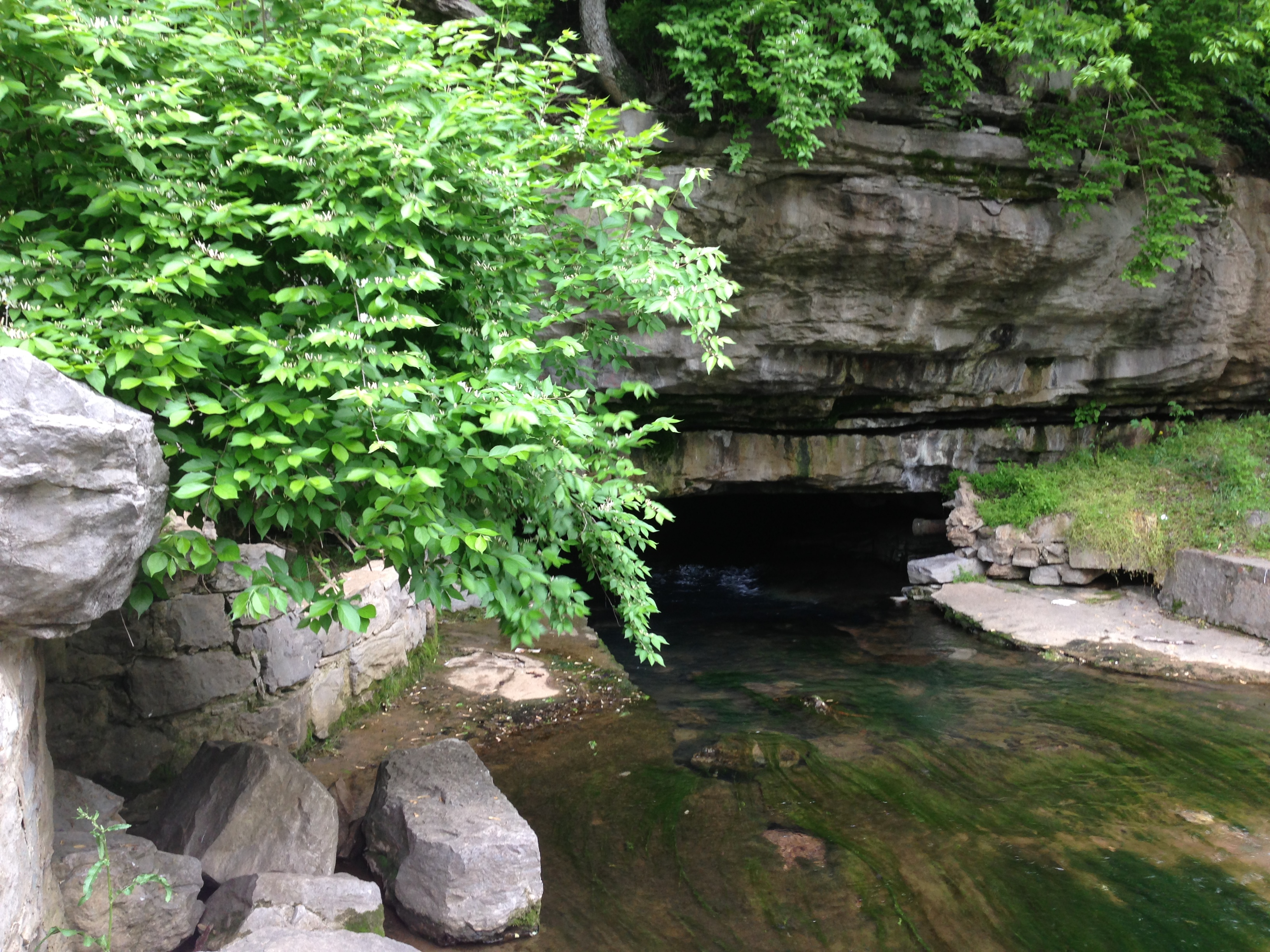
Big Springs Cave in the center of Princeton

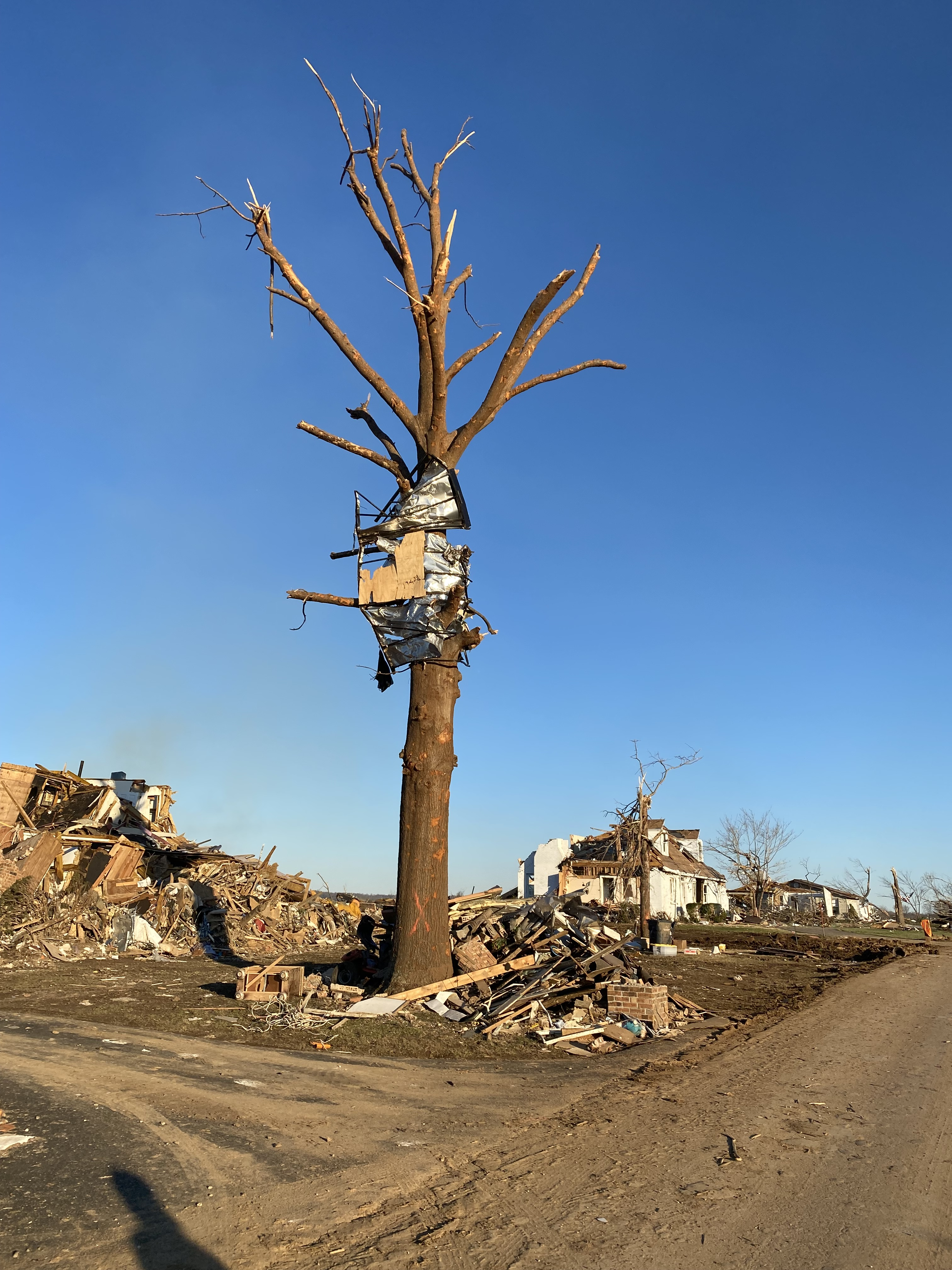
A photo of some of the damage in Princeton from the 2021 Western Kentucky tornado.

The community at the head of Eddy Creek was first called Eddy Grove for the creek's source at a large whirling spring. 1,700 acres (690 ha) of surrounding land was granted to the Virginian William Prince for his service during the American Revolution. He settled there in what was then Livingston County in 1799 and erected Shandy Hall, a brick home and tavern. Prince's heirs and another local landowner named Thomas Frazier granted 40 acres (16 ha) around Eddy Grove and Prince's Place towards the establishment of a new town in 1817, provided the courthouse of the newly formed Caldwell County was relocated there from Eddyville. The county court accepted the proposal in July and named the new community Princetown, which shortened to Princeton by the time of the Eddy Grove.

Construction of Princeton College began in 1860 but was delayed by the commencement of the Civil War. Confederate troops camped on its campus in 1861, using one of the buildings as a hospital when the area came under Confederate control. Following the Confederate retreat in early 1862, Union soldiers occupied the town for the remainder of the war. In December 1864, Confederate-allied Kentuckian cavalry under Gen. Hylan B. Lyon raided the town and razed the courthouse, which was serving as a Union garrison.

The expansion of railroads in the late 19th century made Princeton an important junction on several major railway lines, most notably the Illinois Central and the Louisville and Nashville Railroad. Princeton was also at the center of the Black Patch Tobacco Wars that occurred after the turn of the 20th century.

Since 1925, Princeton has housed the University of Kentucky Research and Education Center, a campus of the University of Kentucky's College of Agriculture.

=== 2021 tornado ===
A large, violent, and historic tornado tracked through the southern part of Princeton during the late evening hours of December 10, 2021. The tornado traveled about 165.6 miles, forming in northwestern Obion County, Tennessee, and reaching EF4 strength on many occasions along its path, before dissipating in Grayson County, Kentucky. Almost 70 homes were demolished in or near Princeton. Many of the homes damaged or destroyed surrounded the Princeton Golf and Country Club, which now hosts a landfill of approximately 60 homes.

== Geography ==
Princeton is located slightly southwest of the center of Caldwell County at 37°6′28″N 87°52′57″W (37.107674, -87.882479). According to the United States Census Bureau, the city has a total area of 9.0 square miles (23.3 km^{2}), of which 0.023 square miles (0.06 km^{2}), or 0.26%, is water.

U.S. Route 62 (Kentucky) passes through the city center, leading east 12 miles (19 km) to Dawson Springs and west 12 miles (19 km) to Eddyville. Interstate 69 runs along the northern edge of Princeton, with access from exits 79 (Kentucky Route 91) and 81 (KY 293). KY 91 runs northwest from Princeton 22 miles (35 km) to Marion and southeast 28 miles (45 km) to Hopkinsville.

Hays Spring, located on Hayes Spring Road west of the city limits, is a natural spring that once supplied the water to the Princeton area.

Princeton was a prime viewing spot for the total solar eclipse of August 21, 2017. This eclipse was viewable across the United States, with its maximum peak in Princeton, where totality lasted 2 minutes and 40 seconds.

=== Climate ===
The climate in this area is characterized by hot, humid summers and generally mild to cool winters. According to the Köppen Climate Classification system, Princeton has a humid subtropical climate, abbreviated "Cfa" on climate maps.

Climate data for Princeton, Kentucky (1991–2020 normals, extremes 1893–2021)
Month	Jan	Feb	Mar	Apr	May	Jun	Jul	Aug	Sep	Oct	Nov	Dec	Year
Record high °F (°C)	80 (27)	82 (28)	90 (32)	92 (33)	98 (37)	109 (43)	110 (43)	108 (42)	106 (41)	96 (36)	84 (29)	78 (26)	110 (43)
Mean maximum °F (°C)	64.9 (18.3)	70.5 (21.4)	78.2 (25.7)	84.3 (29.1)	89.1 (31.7)	94.4 (34.7)	96.4 (35.8)	96.1 (35.6)	93.4 (34.1)	86.2 (30.1)	75.6 (24.2)	67.2 (19.6)	98.2 (36.8)
Mean daily maximum °F (°C)	46.3 (7.9)	51.1 (10.6)	60.7 (15.9)	71.5 (21.9)	78.8 (26.0)	86.1 (30.1)	89.2 (31.8)	88.6 (31.4)	83.3 (28.5)	72.7 (22.6)	59.7 (15.4)	49.2 (9.6)	69.8 (21.0)
Daily mean °F (°C)	36.7 (2.6)	40.6 (4.8)	49.1 (9.5)	59.2 (15.1)	67.4 (19.7)	75.1 (23.9)	78.5 (25.8)	77.3 (25.2)	70.9 (21.6)	60.0 (15.6)	48.5 (9.2)	39.8 (4.3)	58.6 (14.8)
Mean daily minimum °F (°C)	27.1 (−2.7)	30.0 (−1.1)	37.6 (3.1)	46.8 (8.2)	56.0 (13.3)	64.2 (17.9)	67.7 (19.8)	66.0 (18.9)	58.6 (14.8)	47.3 (8.5)	37.4 (3.0)	30.4 (−0.9)	47.4 (8.6)
Mean minimum °F (°C)	5.3 (−14.8)	10.7 (−11.8)	18.0 (−7.8)	29.4 (−1.4)	39.7 (4.3)	52.1 (11.2)	58.1 (14.5)	56.1 (13.4)	43.2 (6.2)	29.7 (−1.3)	20.1 (−6.6)	12.1 (−11.1)	2.4 (−16.4)
Record low °F (°C)	−24 (−31)	−32 (−36)	−9 (−23)	19 (−7)	29 (−2)	41 (5)	43 (6)	40 (4)	27 (−3)	13 (−11)	−8 (−22)	−14 (−26)	−32 (−36)
Average precipitation inches (mm)	3.66 (93)	4.05 (103)	4.75 (121)	5.13 (130)	4.79 (122)	4.47 (114)	4.53 (115)	3.51 (89)	3.28 (83)	4.07 (103)	4.09 (104)	4.55 (116)	50.88 (1,292)
Average snowfall inches (cm)	2.6 (6.6)	2.7 (6.9)	1.4 (3.6)	0.0 (0.0)	0.0 (0.0)	0.0 (0.0)	0.0 (0.0)	0.0 (0.0)	0.0 (0.0)	0.1 (0.25)	0.1 (0.25)	1.6 (4.1)	8.5 (22)
Average precipitation days (≥ 0.01 in)	9.7	9.5	11.1	10.5	11.0	10.2	8.7	7.5	6.6	8.1	9.3	10.7	112.9
Average snowy days (≥ 0.1 in)	1.3	1.4	0.5	0.0	0.0	0.0	0.0	0.0	0.0	0.0	0.1	0.9	4.2
Source: NOAA

== Culture ==
=== Night Riders and Black Patch Festival ===
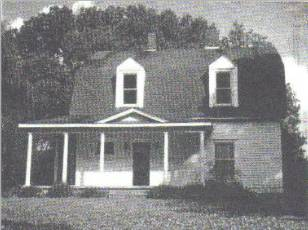
Amoss House, home of Dr. David Amoss, leader of the Night Riders

Rich in Southern culture much like the rest of Western Kentucky. Every September, Princeton hosts the Black Patch Festival in its historic downtown. Up to 65 booths feature a variety of festival foods, games and activities. One of the highlights of the Black Patch Festival each year is the gospel concert held at the Princeton First Baptist Church.

The festival is named after the unique variety of "Black Patch" tobacco grown in the surrounding areas of western Kentucky and northwest Tennessee. Tobacco was at the center of one of the largest civil uprisings in American history.

By the start of the 20th century, an agricultural boom in dark leaf tobacco had made Caldwell County, along with Christian County, a major tobacco growing area. However, the monopolization of the tobacco market by James B. Duke left many farmers in debt. A vigilante force called the Night Riders was formed to combat the Duke monopoly and terrorized those who cooperated with the tobacco company by destroying crops, burning warehouses, and even physical intimidation.

On December 1, 1906, the Night Riders raided Princeton and burned the largest tobacco factories in the world.

=== Big Springs ===
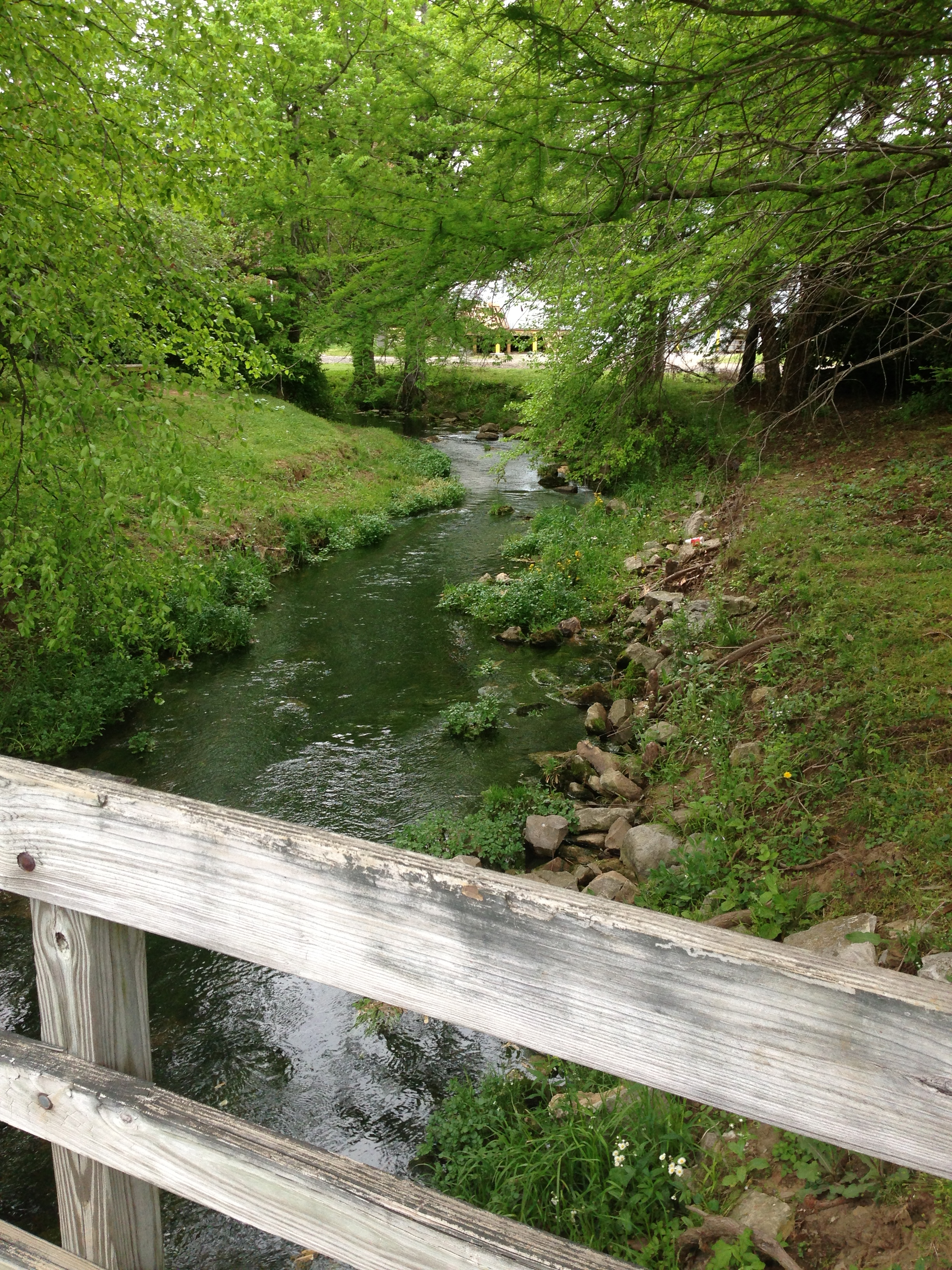
Big Springs

This large, natural spring flows from a cave located in the heart of downtown Princeton. The town's founder chose to build his home above the spring and established a sawmill close by. Ancient trails used by animals and early Indians, and later by stagecoaches and pioneers, all met at the spring. They led to the major rivers of the area, the Cumberland and the Ohio.

During the Cherokee removal of 1838–39, the Native Americans were to be moved west on steamboats. However, a severe drought in the summer of 1838 made river travel all but impossible. With thousands of people, plus a large number of horses, wagons, and other livestock, water was of the utmost importance for survival. Eleven of the 13 Ross detachments came through Princeton on their way to the Ohio River and stopped at Big Spring.

Big Spring Park, a certified site, is owned by the City of Princeton and is accessible to visitors.

=== Adsmore Museum ===
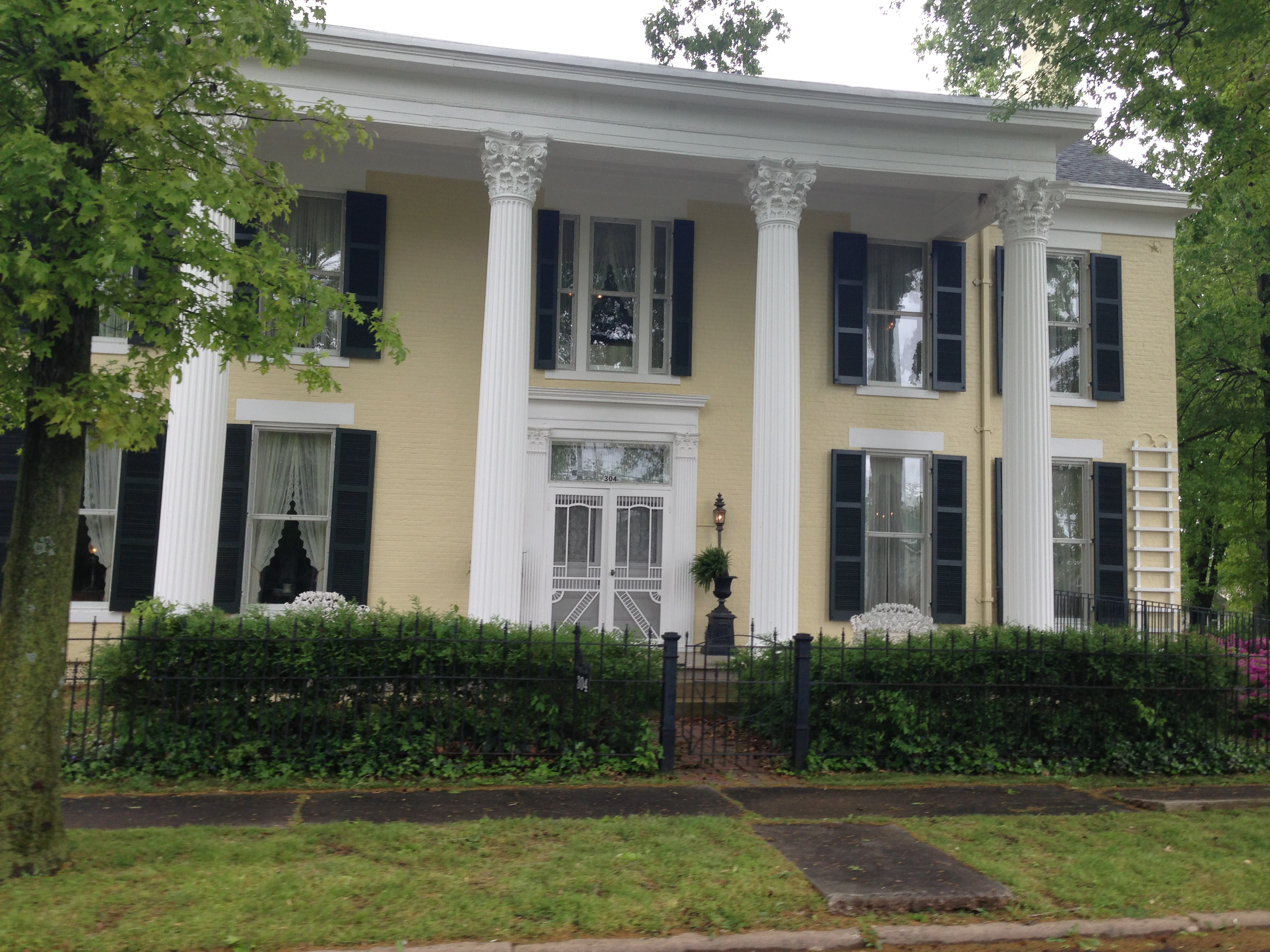
Adsmore museum

Adsmore is a living history museum located on North Jefferson Street in Princeton. It is the only living home museum in Kentucky. Its name is believed to be derived from numerous additions and renovations over 150 years.

Adsmore reflects the lifestyle of the prominent Smith-Garrett family at the close of the "Golden Age". Tours center on events which took place in the lives of John Parker Smith and Nancy Bond Kevil Smith and their five children: Mayme, Kate, Shell, James Urey (Did) and Selina. Different "seasons" are presented throughout the year to reflect the events of the Smith-Garrett family throughout the years as well as holidays. These different settings include Christmas, Easter, the Black Patch War and weddings and engagements.

=== Eddie Pennington Festival ===
Princeton is home to the annual Pennington Folk Festival, hosted each summer on the grounds of the Old Butler High School by the Princeton Art Guild. Started in 1997, the Pennington Festival has been a staple music event for western Kentucky, honoring the town's own Eddie Pennington for his contributions to folk music and Kentucky's own thumbpicking guitar style. Pennington, a nationally recognized musician, continues the tradition of "thumbpicking" popularized by Merle Travis and further developed by instrumentalists such as Chet Atkins.

=== Col. Bill Newsom's Aged Kentucky Country Ham ===
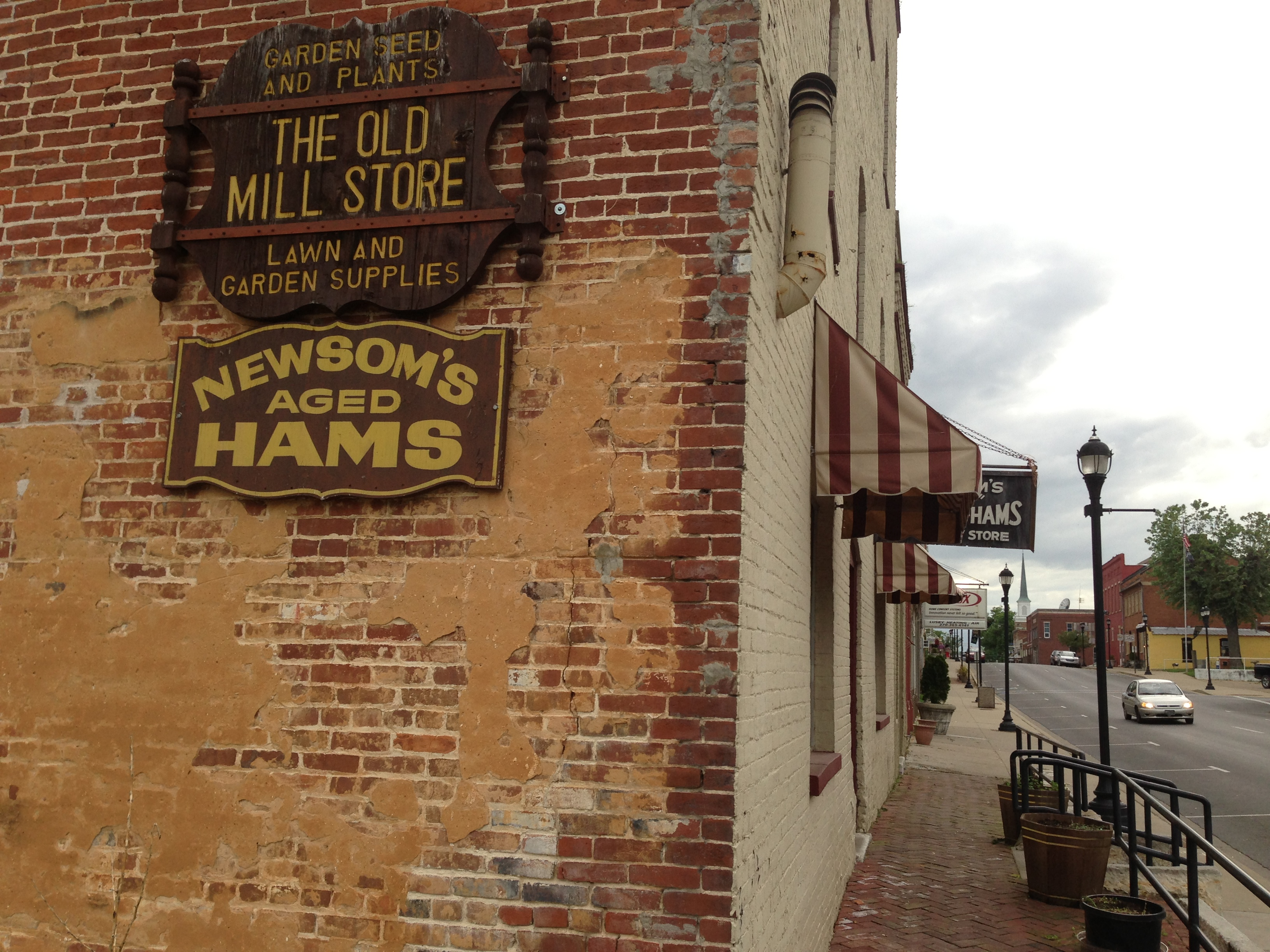
Nancy Newsom's Hams

Newsom's Old Mill Store and Col. Bill Newsom's Aged Country Hams are owned and operated by Nancy Newsom Mahaffey, "the Ham Lady". Newsom's was established January 1, 1917, by H.C. Newsom, Nancy's grandfather.

Newsom's ham was honored to participate in the 5th World Congress of Dry Cured Hams in Aracena, Spain, in May 2009, and a two-year-old Newsom's ham was encased for continuing display in the Jamon Museum there, the only ham in the United States of America to be invited. Newsom's ham was also served at the Kentucky Ball during the 2008 Presidential Inauguration.

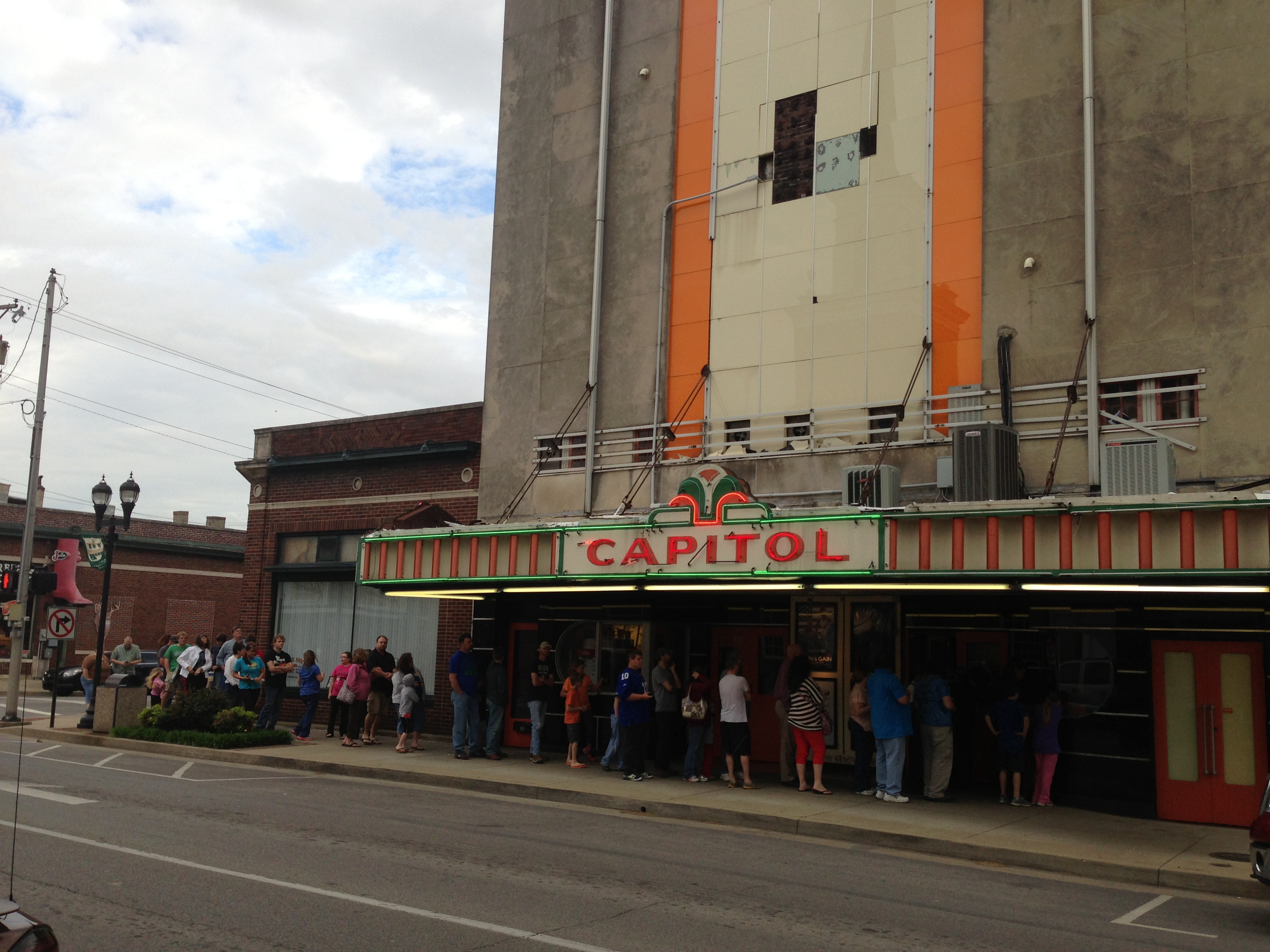
Capitol Cinemas

=== Capitol Cinemas ===
The original theater on this site was the Savoy Theater. It burned to the ground in 1937. The Capitol Cinemas was built on the same site and opened in 1939. The Capitol was re-opened in 1996 and has been in continuous operation since that time. It is the only restored Art Deco theatre in a small community that shows current movies on three screens.

Capitol Cinemas runs first-run films and holds special events for school, church and community events.

The theater closed in 2020 due to the COVID-19 pandemic and was left abandoned.

=== Historic Downtown and Let's Paint the Town! ===
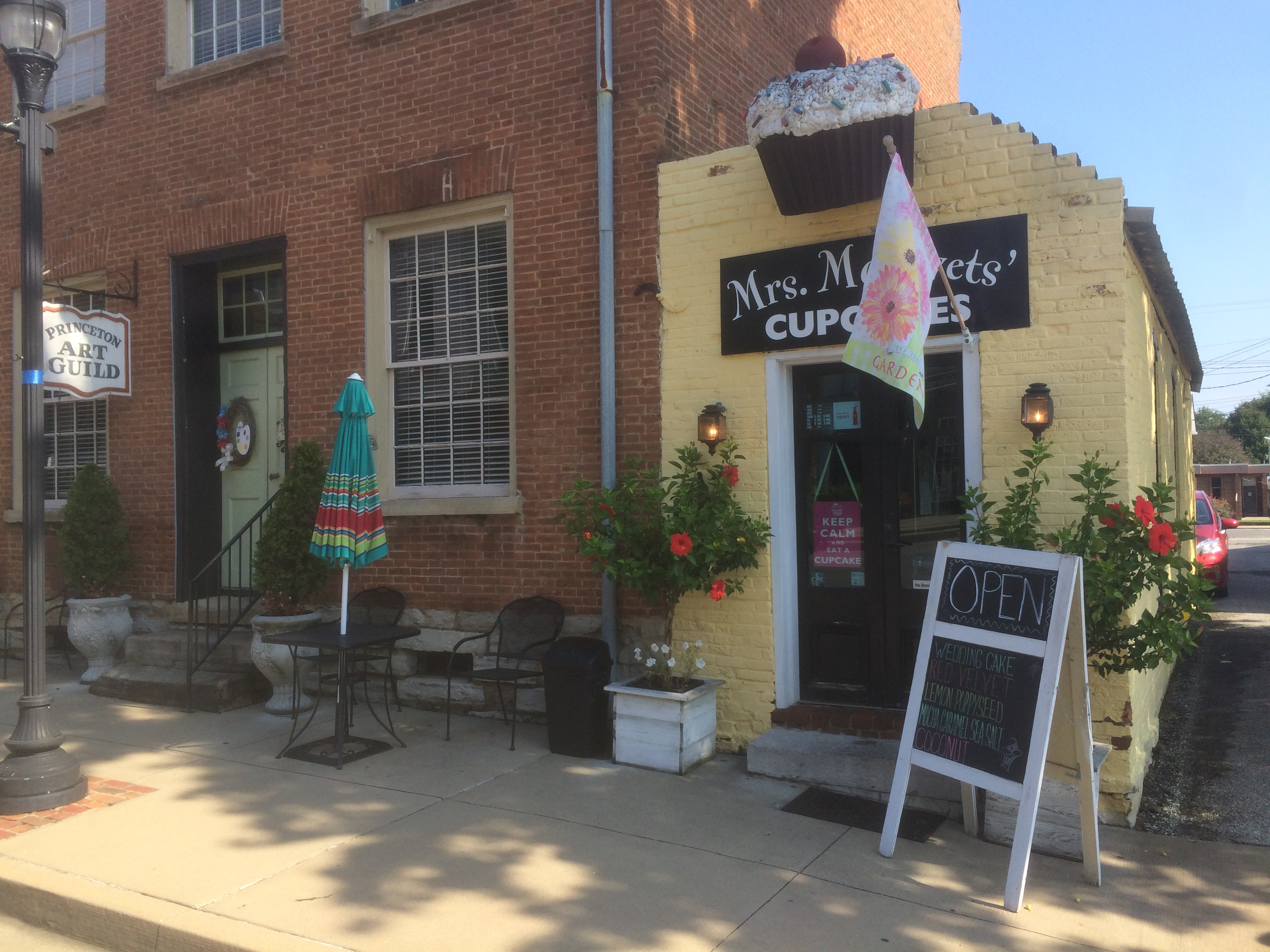
Princeton downtown

Efforts were organized in 2006 to bring the community on board with plans for a "new look" to the downtown historic district. It was emphasized that with community participation, donated funds and volunteer labor, Princeton's downtown could be transformed.

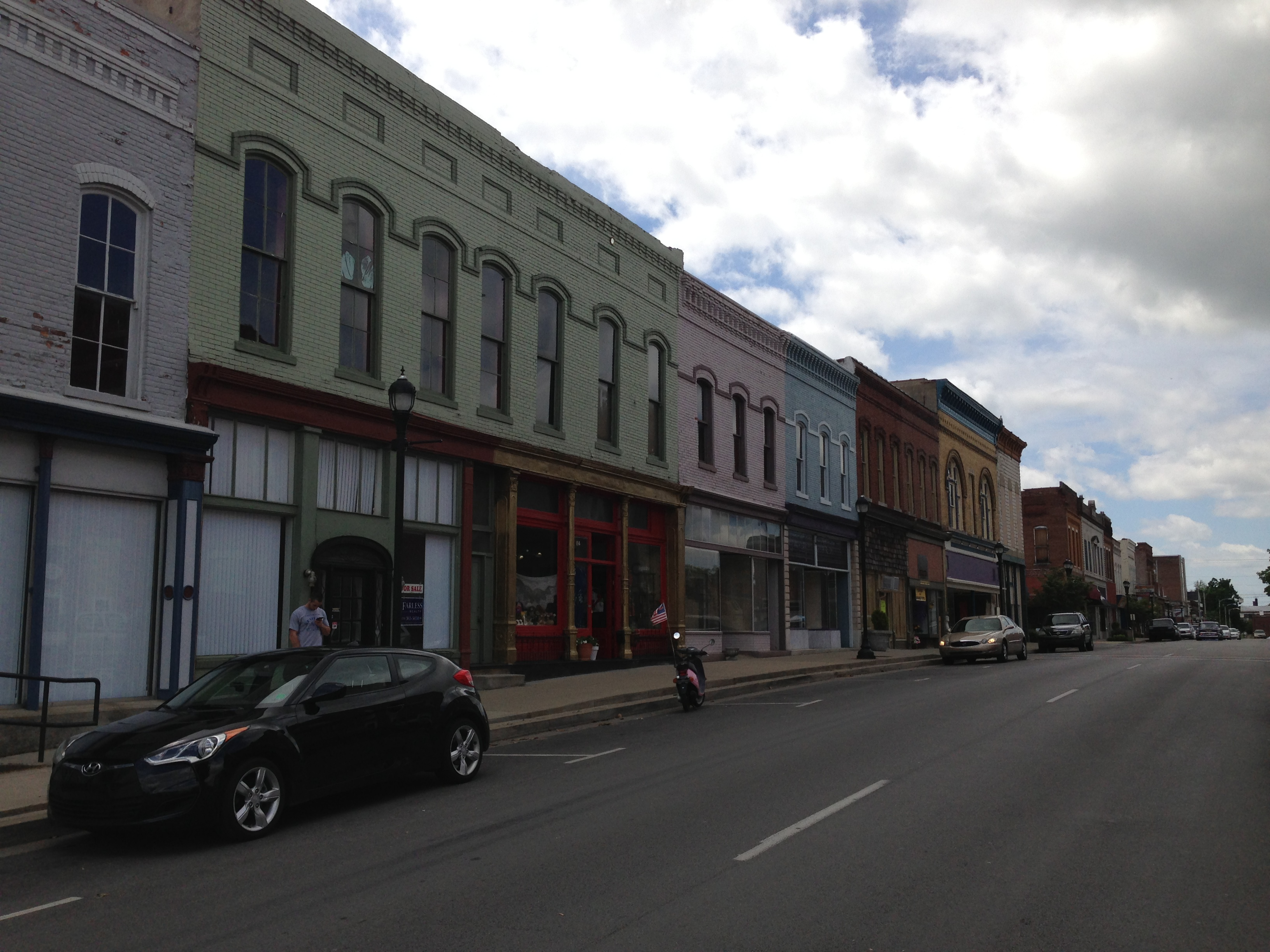
Downtown Princeton Kentucky

In 2008 the Kentucky Heritage Council honored the town with the Ida Lee Willis Memorial Foundation's Preservation Award "in recognition of the significant accomplishment involving the preservation and historic restoration through increased awareness and civic involvement" for "Let's Paint the Town!". At the invitation of the National Trust for Historic Preservation, "Let's Paint the Town!" was honored to present its success to the nation in Chicago (2009) and Oklahoma City (2010) at the National Main Streets Conference.

== Economy ==
TreeHouse Foods is a major employer in Princeton. Agriculture, tourism and retail are also significant sectors of the economy.

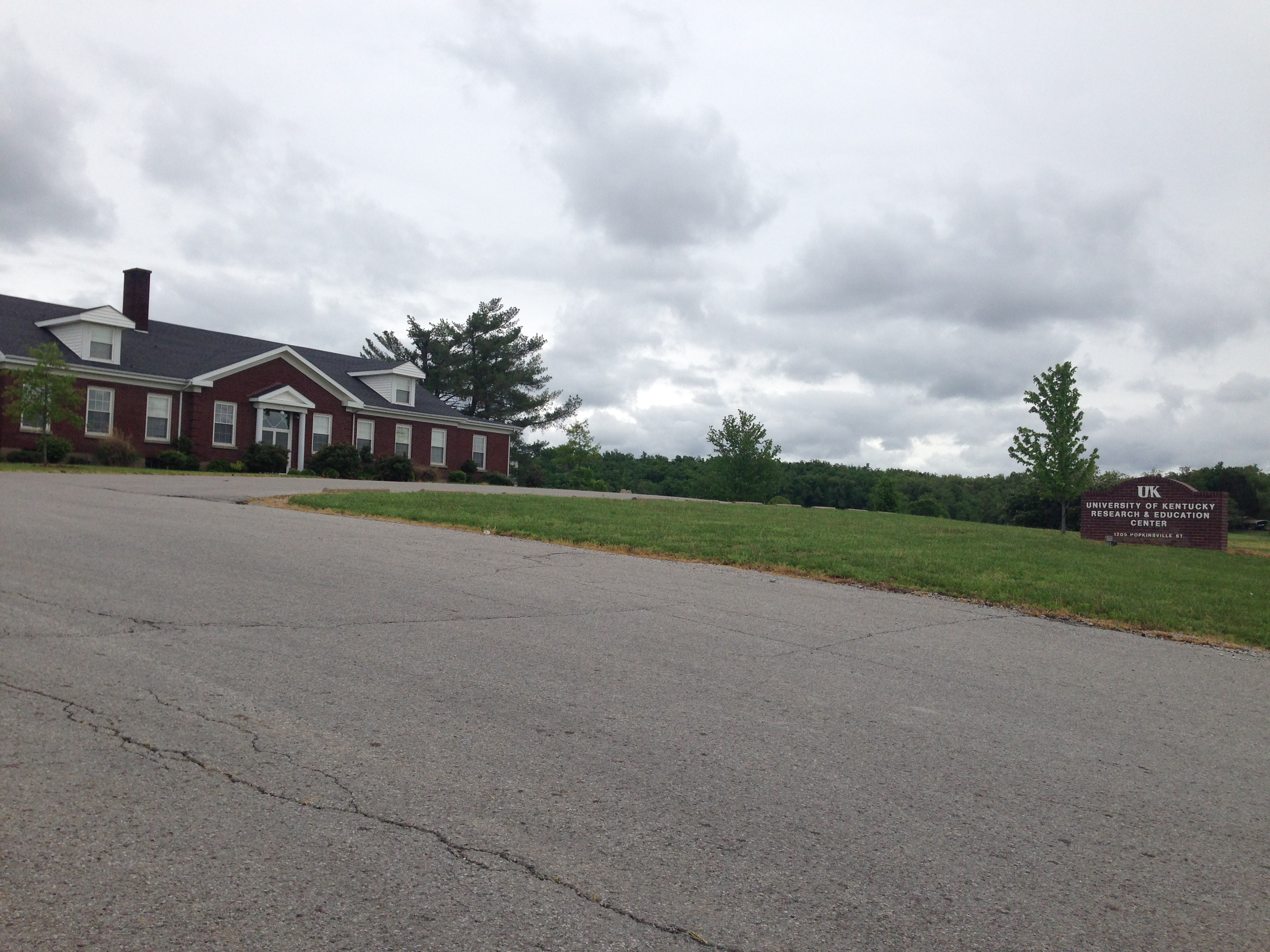
Agriculture station

The University of Kentucky Research and Education Center Botanical Garden is stationed in Princeton. The original 400 acres (160 ha) of land were donated by the citizens of Caldwell County, who raised funds by public subscription for the purchase. Formal ceremonies were held September 7, 1925, for dedication of the Substation to "scientific agriculture and a better Kentucky." With an initial staff of one, early program emphasis was placed on rebuilding the depleted cropland areas and applying conservation practices to the badly eroded steeper land. Experimental work on liming, fertilizer application, and use of improved seeding mixtures was begun and structures for crop and animal production research were added. Outstanding livestock herds were established and research with pastures, grain crops, tobacco, fruits, and vegetables was expanded.

In 2012, Princeton voted to allow alcohol sales within city limits. Alcohol sales had been illegal since Prohibition.

== Education ==
The Caldwell County Schools system administers primary, elementary, middle and high schools. It also runs a vocational school that offers programs in carpentry, agriculture, automotive technology and health services.

Caldwell County High School is home to the 1998 Class AA high school football champions. Caldwell County High School also won a state championship in football in 1963.

Princeton has a public library, the George Coon Public Library.

== Demographics ==
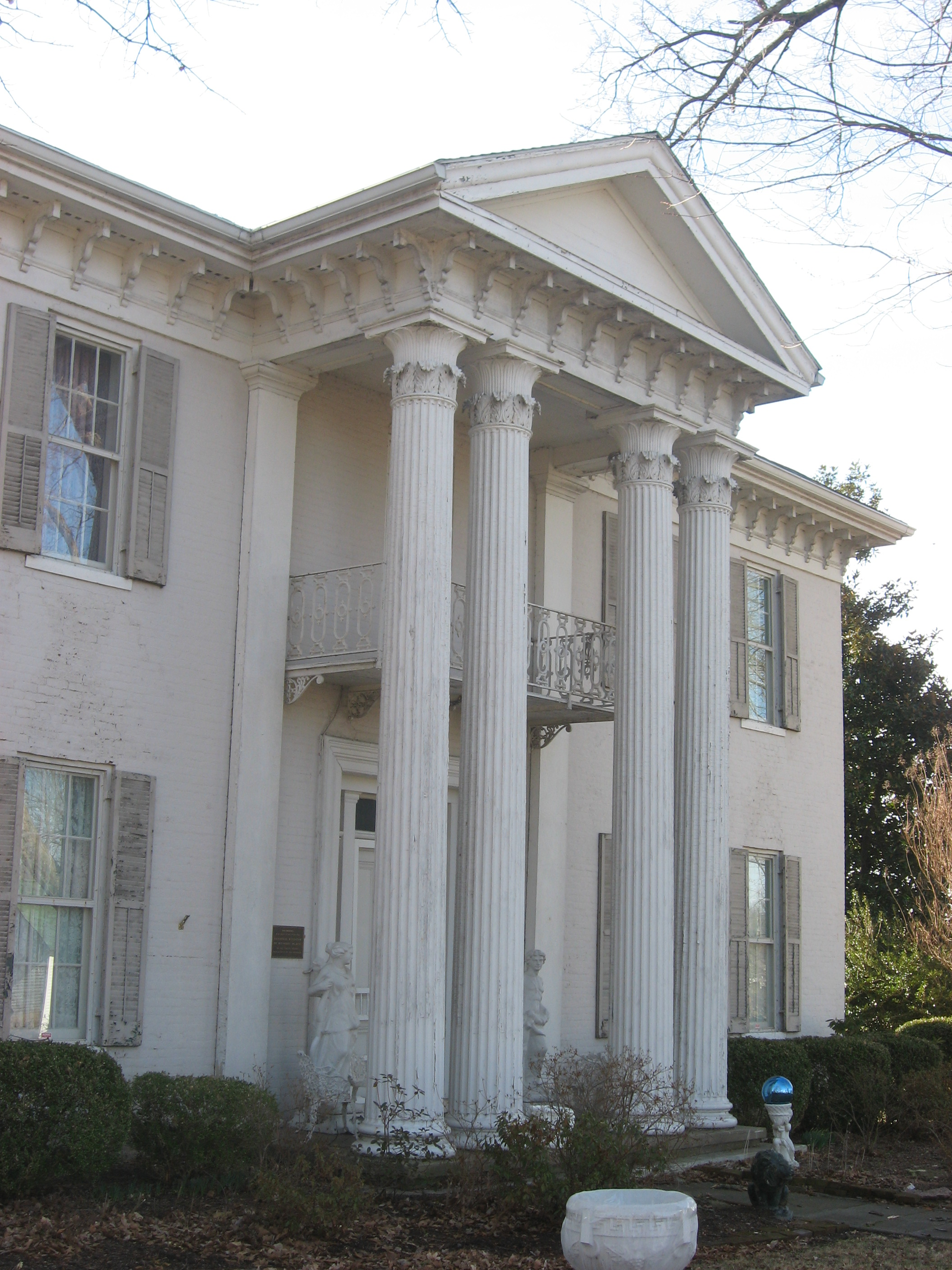
L. B. Overly House, listed on the National Register of Historic Places

Historical population
Census	Pop.	Note	%±
1830	366		—
1860	781		—
1870	1,012		29.6%
1880	1,204		19.0%
1890	1,857		54.2%
1900	2,556		37.6%
1910	3,015		18.0%
1920	3,689		22.4%
1930	4,764		29.1%
1940	5,389		13.1%
1950	5,388		0.0%
1960	5,618		4.3%
1970	6,292		12.0%
1980	7,073		12.4%
1990	6,940		−1.9%
2000	6,536		−5.8%
2010	6,329		−3.2%
2020	6,270		−0.9%
2024 (est.)	6,223		−0.7%
U.S. Decennial Census

=== 2020 census ===
As of the 2020 census, Princeton had a population of 6,270. The median age was 40.6 years. 23.3% of residents were under the age of 18 and 21.0% of residents were 65 years of age or older. For every 100 females there were 87.4 males, and for every 100 females age 18 and over there were 82.3 males age 18 and over.

96.6% of residents lived in urban areas, while 3.4% lived in rural areas.

There were 2,647 households in Princeton, of which 29.4% had children under the age of 18 living in them. Of all households, 37.9% were married-couple households, 18.1% were households with a male householder and no spouse or partner present, and 37.1% were households with a female householder and no spouse or partner present. About 34.6% of all households were made up of individuals and 17.5% had someone living alone who was 65 years of age or older.

There were 3,058 housing units, of which 13.4% were vacant. The homeowner vacancy rate was 3.0% and the rental vacancy rate was 9.6%.

Racial composition as of the 2020 census
Race	Number	Percent
White	5,213	83.1%
Black or African American	609	9.7%
American Indian and Alaska Native	12	0.2%
Asian	41	0.7%
Native Hawaiian and Other Pacific Islander	0	0.0%
Some other race	45	0.7%
Two or more races	350	5.6%
Hispanic or Latino (of any race)	127	2.0%

=== 2000 census ===
As of the 2000 census, there were 6,536 people, 2,810 households, and 1,798 families residing in the city. The population density was 716.1 inhabitants per square mile (276.5/km^{2}). There were 3,150 housing units at an average density of 345.1 units per square mile (133.2 units/km^{2}). The racial makeup of the city was 89.20% White, 9.01% African American, 0.14% Native American, 0.28% Asian, 0.64% from other races, and 0.73% from two or more races. Hispanic or Latino of any race were 0.92% of the population.

There were 2,810 households, out of which 27.9% had children under the age of 18 living with them, 47.3% were married couples living together, 13.6% had a female householder with no husband present, and 36.0% were non-families. 33.1% of all households were made up of individuals, and 18.4% had someone living alone who was 65 years of age or older. The average household size was 2.24 and the average family size was 2.83.

In the city, the population was spread out, with 22.6% under the age of 18, 6.9% from 18 to 24, 25.2% from 25 to 44, 23.7% from 45 to 64, and 21.6% who were 65 years of age or older. The median age was 42 years. For every 100 females, there were 82.9 males. For every 100 females age 18 and over, there were 78.1 males.

The median income for a household in the city was $26,654, and the median income for a family was $33,895. Males had a median income of $31,935 versus $21,152 for females. The per capita income for the city was $16,873. About 14.2% of families and 18.5% of the population were below the poverty line, including 22.6% of those under age 18 and 17.8% of those age 65 or over.

== Notable people ==
- David Alexander, president of Pomona College and Rhodes Scholarship administrator, grew up in Princeton
- James Ford, civic leader, businessman, and criminal gang leader in western Kentucky.
- Marvin Gray, convicted serial killer; was born in Princeton
- J. D. Grey, Southern Baptist, clergyman.
- Scott Jennings, CNN political commentator and SNC podcast host
- Charles Lisanby, pioneer in color television, 2010 inductee in Television Academy Hall of Fame.
- Rodney H. Mabry, third president of The University of Texas at Tyler for 18 years (retired, 2016)
- Greg Smith, retired professional basketball player for the Milwaukee Bucks in the National Basketball Association, born in Princeton.
- Mabel Stark, one of the first woman tiger tamers with Ringling Brothers, Barnum & Bailey Circus and with Al Barnes Circus in the early 1900s; spent her early life in Princeton as Mary Haynie.
- Emma Talley, golfer who won the 2013 U.S. Women's Amateur and the 2015 NCAA Women's Golf title. She was born in nearby Paducah, Kentucky, but raised in Princeton.
- Martha Nelson Thomas, creator of "Doll Babies," later plagiarized as Cabbage Patch Kids, born in Princeton.
- Malachi Thompson, jazz trumpeter born in Princeton.
- Bross Townsend, jazz and blues pianist born in Princeton.
- Ada Henry Van Pelt, editor and inventor, born in Princeton.
- J. D. Watkins, Louisiana judge, state senator, district attorney, graduate of Cumberland College in Princeton
