= Tennessee State Route 76 =

Highway in Tennessee

State Route 76
- SR 76; primary in red, secondary in blue, unsigned in green

Route information
- Maintained by TDOT
- Length: 231.44 mi (372.47 km)
- Existed: October 1, 1923–present

Major junctions
- South end: SR 57 in Moscow
- US 64 in Somerville; I-40 in Dancyville; US 70 / US 79 in Brownsville; US 45W in Humboldt; US 45E in Milan; US 641 in Paris; I-24 in Sango; US 41 in Adams; I-65 in White House; US 31W in White House
- East end: SR 109 in Portland

Location
- Country: United States
- State: Tennessee
- Counties: Fayette, Haywood, Crockett, Gibson, Carroll, Henry, Stewart, Montgomery, Robertson, Sumner

Highway system
- Tennessee State Routes; Interstate; US; State
← US 76	→ SR 77

State Route 76 (SR 76) is a state highway in Tennessee, traversing the state in a northeast-southwest axis from east of Memphis to north of Nashville. SR 76 is unique in that it actually changes its cardinal directions (from North-South to East-West) in Clarksville at the junction with US 41A and US 41A Bypass.

== Route description ==
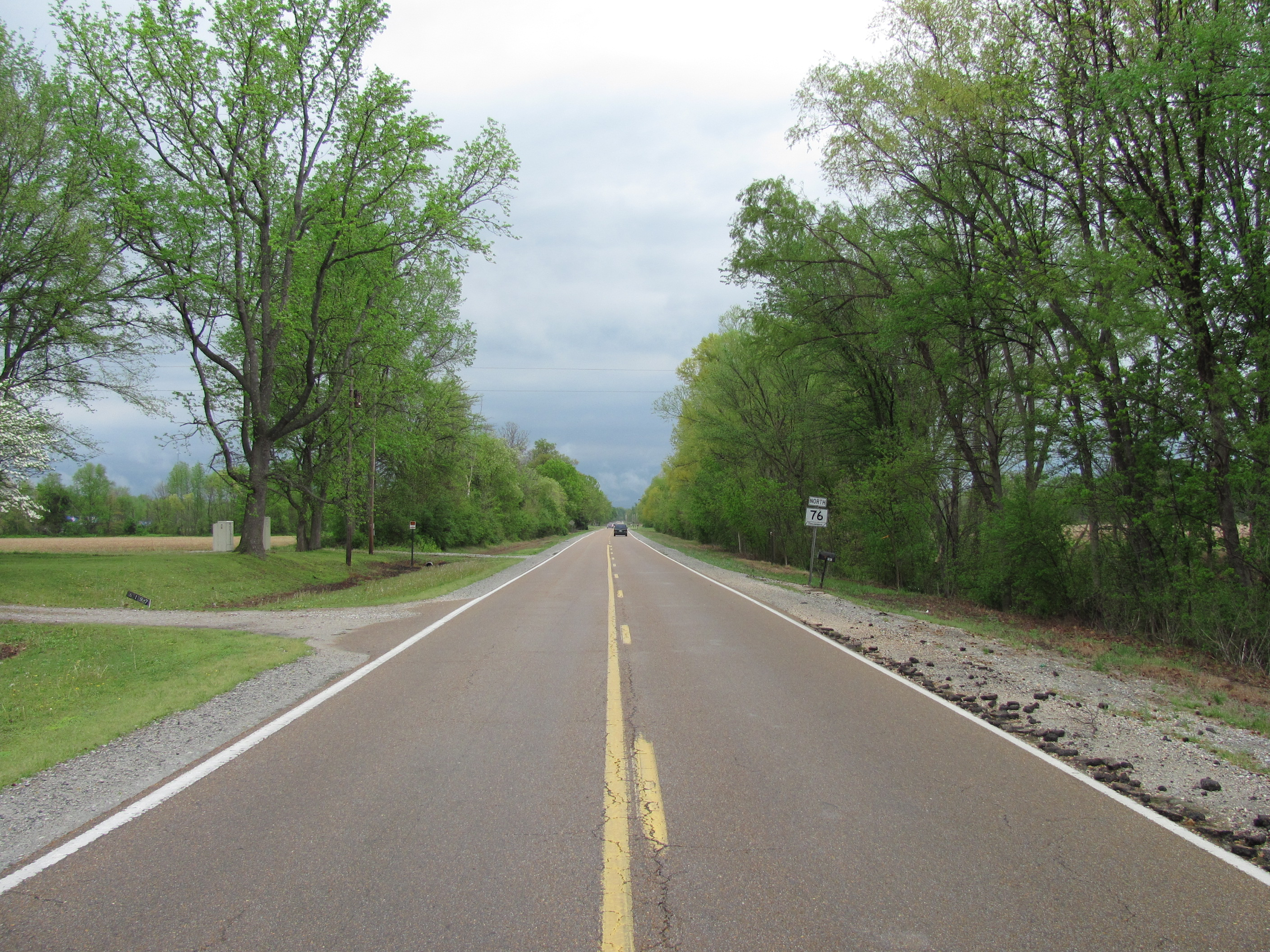
Northbound in Stanton

=== Fayette County ===
SR 76 begins as a primary highway in Fayette County in Moscow at a junction with SR 57, its southern terminus. The highway goes north as a 2-lane highway through countryside and wooded areas to the community of Williston and has a junction with SR 193. It then turns slight northeast before turning north again at the junction with SR 195 just south of Somerville. SR 76 then enters Somerville and passes through a neighborhood before entering downtown and intersecting US 64/SR 15. It then passes through another neighborhood before crossing the Loosahatchie River and leaving Somerville to have a Y-Intersection with SR 59 shortly thereafter, with SR 76 turning northeast once again while SR 59 branches off to the northwest.

=== Haywood County ===
SR 76 then enters Haywood County and immediately enters the small community of Dancyville and becomes concurrent with SR 179. They then split just before the first of two interchanges with I-40 (Exit 52). SR 76 then crosses the Hatchie River and has another interchange with I-40 (Exit 56) before reaching Brownsville. It then comes to an intersection with US 70/US 79/SR 1/SR 19 and becomes concurrent with that route. At this point SR 76 becomes unsigned. SR 19 breaks away to the east shortly afterwards and US 70/US 79/SR 1/SR 76 then follow a new bypass around downtown to an intersection with US 70A. US 79 and SR 76 then break away from US 70/SR 1 to follow US 70A and they then leave Brownsville going northeast just an intersection with SR 369. They then cross the South Fork of the Forked Deer River before crossing into Crockett County.

=== Crockett County ===
US 79/SR 76 then enter Bells shortly afterwards to have a short concurrency with SR 88. They then have an interchange with US 412/SR 20 before leaving Bells and entering farmland. They pass through the community of Fruitvale and the town of Gadsden, where they intersect SR 221, before crossing the Middle Fork of the Forked Deer River into Gibson County and immediately enter Humboldt.

=== Gibson County ===
SR-76/US-79-70A interchanges with the US 79-70A bypass around Downtown Humboldt, US 79-70A bypass Humboldt, Tennessee via SR 366, turning north and widening to a 4-lane highway. The US 79-70A bypass (SR 366) intersects with SR 152 0.8 mile after the business and bypass interchange. SR 76 runs straight into Downtown Humboldt, turning east as Main St. SR 76 intersects with US 45W/SR 5. The following routes become concurrent as Main St after the US 45W/SR 5 intersection: SR 76/SR 5 and US 45W Business. As you exit Downtown Humboldt, US 45W Business/ SR 5 continues straight, and SR 76 splits off and reconnects with US 79-70A (SR 366) approximately 1 mile later. SR 76/ US 79-70A leaves Humboldt and narrows back to a 2-lane highway. SR 76 intersects with SR 187 a mile after the 2-lane begins. SR 76 goes through rural farmland and passes through Gibson, having an intersection with SR 186 5 miles before entering Milan. SR 76/ US 79-70A intersect with US 45E/SR 43/SR 77/SR 104, and becomes concurrent with SR 77 as a 5-lane undivided Highway going out of Milan, Tennessee. SR 76 then intersects SR 425 before leaving Milan and narrows to a 4-lane divided highway for a few miles before turning left, becoming old US 79/70A crossing into Carroll County. SR 76 is currently undergoing a widening after the intersection with US-70A. The Project will make SR 76/ US 79-70A a 4-lane divided highway from Milan city limits to the existing 5-lane undivided highway that goes into McKenzie, Tennessee. The Gibson County portion of the project is complete.

=== Carroll County ===
SR 76 enters Atwood via a 2-lane highway and intersects SR 220 shortly before US 70A and SR 77 split, at a Y-Intersection, to the east, while SR 76 continues to follow US 79. US 79/SR 76 continue northeast and pass through Trezevant, intersecting SR 105 at a 4-way stop. SR 76/ US 79 leave Trezevant and immediately enter a road work zone. SR 76 detours from the original route on a portion of the SR 76/ US 79 widening project. SR 76 reconnects with the legacy route after a mile detour. After passing through the Trezevant swamp, SR 76/ US 79 widens to a 5-lane undivided highway several miles before entering McKenzie. SR 76/ US 79 intersects with SR 436, SR 124 via red light intersections. SR 76/ US 79 narrows to a 4-lane undivided highway shortly after the intersection with TN-124. SR 76 intersects SR 423 shortly before a 3 clover interchange with SR 22. SR 76/ US 79 exit McKenzie and cross into Henry County. SR 76/ US 79 widens to a 4-lane divided highway shortly after crossing the Henry County Line.

=== Henry County ===
US 79/SR 76 after several miles, passes through the town of Henry, bypassing it while the old alignment through Henry is now named Pioneer Road. SR 76/ US 79 then continues northeast and widens to a 5-lane undivided highway shortly before a red light intersection with SR 218 (Paris Bypass) a few miles before entering Paris. Shortly after entering Paris City Limits, SR 79/ US 79 intersects US 641/SR 69 at a red light, bypassing downtown to the southeast. SR 76/ US 79 then intersects SR 356 at a red light turning before going through a business district. As SR 76/ US 79 leave Paris, there is an intersection with SR 218 (Paris Bypass) once more before narrowing to a 4-lane divided highway. SR 76 then passes through the countryside and intersects SR 140 south of Buchanan before entering Paris Landing State Park. SR 76/ US 79 has one last intersection with SR 119 before crossing the Ned McWherter Memorial Bridge over Kentucky Lake/Tennessee River into Middle Tennessee Stewart County.

=== Stewart County ===
US 79/SR 76 then enter the Land Between the Lakes National Recreation Area and intersect with SR 232 and several park access roads, including the SR 461 (The Trace), before narrowing to 2-lanes to enter Dover and leaving the park. In downtown they intersect with SR 49 before leaving Dover by crossing the Cumberland River as a 2-lane highway. It then widens back to 4-lanes one mile (1.6 km) later and turns southeast at the intersection with SR 120. They then junction with SR 46 north of Indian Mound before crossing into Montgomery County.

=== Montgomery County ===
They then turn northeast again before passing through Woodlawn and intersecting with SR 233. US 79/SR 76 then widen to 5-lanes at the interchange with SR 374 and enters Clarksville. SR 76 and US 79 then merge with US 41A/SR 12 after passing through some neighborhoods and come to an intersection with US 41A Bypass/SR 13 just north of downtown, where US 79 breaks away from SR 76 to follow SR 13 north to Kentucky and SR 12 branches away to follow US 41A Bypass. US 41A/SR 76 continue south into downtown as a 2-lane road (as North 2nd Street) before turning east onto College Street (SR 48) before turning south again on University Avenue (SR 112, becomes concurrent with and is unsigned) before again turning east to follow Madison Street as they exit downtown and enter neighborhoods. They then curve to the southeast and pass by several businesses and have another junction with SR 374 before SR 76 breaks away from US 41A/SR 112, at another intersection with US 41A Bypass, and goes northeast, exiting Clarksville and switching cardinal directions from north-south to east-west. For four miles (6.4 km) past this junction, SR 76 widens to a four-lane divided highway. It then has an interchange with I-24 (exit 11) in Sango and then funnels down to a two lane road. It then passes through Port Royal and junctions with SR 238 before crossing Sulphur Fork Creek into Robertson County.

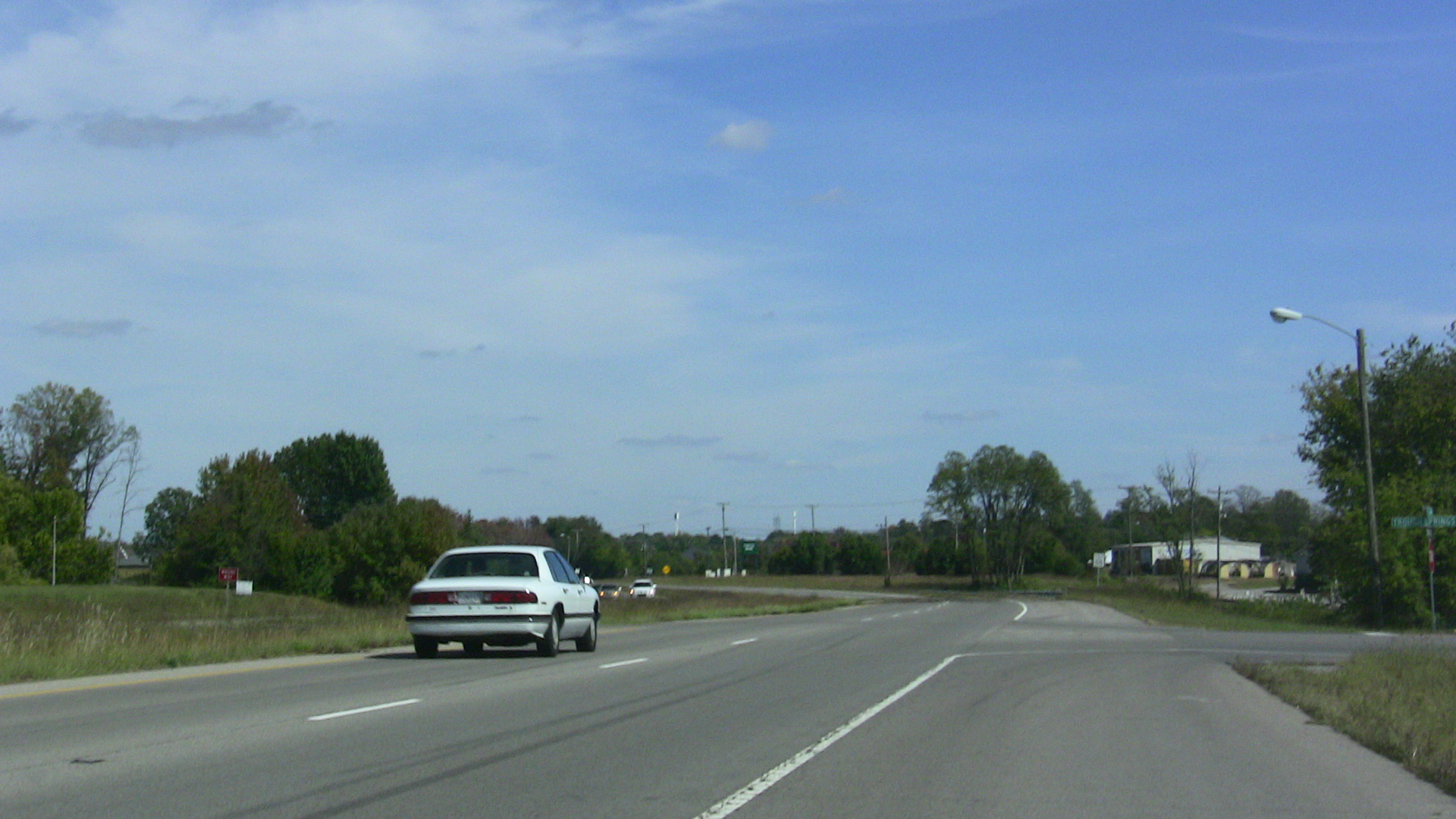
This is a somewhat random picture of Tennessee State Route 76 in Clarksville, Tennessee. The stretch between US Route 41A and Interstate 24 (Exit 11) is a four-lane divided highway.

=== Robertson County ===
SR 76 continues northeast through farmland to enter Adams and come to an intersection with SR 256. The highway then turns left onto Church Street through downtown before coming to an intersection with US 41/SR 11. Here, while SR 76 turns east to become concurrent with US 41/SR 11, it becomes unsigned, and becomes a secondary highway. US 41/SR 11/SR 76 then leave Adams and goes south east and passes through Cedar Hill before entering Springfield and coming to an intersection with US 431/SR 65. US 41/SR 11/SR 76 turn south to become concurrent with US 431/SR 65 and enters downtown to come to another intersection with SR 49. SR 76 then leaves the concurrency to follow SR 49 east; leaving downtown and passes by a school before SR 76 breaks away from SR 49 just before leaving Springfield as it finally becoming signed once again. SR 76 goes through farmland before entering White House and having an interchange with I-65 (Exit 108) before entering downtown and having an intersection with SR 258. SR 76 then becomes concurrent with US 31W/SR 41, turning north, for approximately 0.2 miles (0.32 km) before branching off to the east again.

=== Sumner County ===
At this point, SR 76 crosses in Sumner County and passes through some neighborhoods before leaving White House and going northeast through farmland once more. It continues northeast to intersect with SR 25 at a 4-way stop before passing through New Deal. SR 76 then comes to an end as a secondary highway at an intersection with SR 109 just south of downtown Portland.

== Major intersections ==
County	Location	mi	km	Destinations	Notes
Fayette	Moscow	0.0	0.0	SR 57 – Rossville, Grand Junction	Southern Terminus; SR 76 begins as a primary highway
Fayette				3 Bridges over North Fork Wolf River	
Fayette	Williston			SR 193 west (Macon Road) – Macon	Eastern terminus of SR 193
Fayette	Somerville			SR 195 west – Macon	Eastern terminus of SR 195; provides access to Fayette County Airport
Fayette	Somerville			US 64 (Fayette Street/SR 15) – Oakland, Whiteville	
Fayette	Somerville			Bridge over the Loosahatchie River	
Fayette				SR 59 west – Braden, Mason	Eastern terminus of SR 59
Haywood	Dancyville			SR 179 west (Dancyville Road) – Stanton	Southern end of SR 179 concurrency
Haywood	Ko Ko			SR 179 east (Eurekaton Road) – Whiteville	Northern end of SR 179 concurrency
Haywood	Ko Ko			Stanton Koko Road to I-40 – Memphis, Nashville	I-40 exit 52
Haywood	Hatchie National Wildlife Refuge			Bridge over Hatchie River	
Haywood	Brownsville			I-40 – Memphis, Nashville	I-40 exit 56
Haywood	Brownsville			US 70 west / US 79 south / SR 19 west (S Dupree Street/SR 1 west) – Nutbush, Stanton	Southern end of US 70/US 79/SR 1/SR 19 concurrency; SR 76 becomes unsigned
Haywood	Brownsville			SR 19 east (Mercer Road) to I-40	Northern end of SR 19 concurrency
Haywood	Brownsville			US 70 east (E Main Street/SR 1 east) / US 70A begins – Jackson	Eastern end of US 70/SR 1 concurrency; western terminus of US 70A; southern end of US 70A concurrency
Haywood	Brownsville			SR 369 west (N Washington Street) – Downtown	Eastern terminus of SR 369
South Fork of the Forked Deer River				Bridge over South Fork of the Forked Deer River	
Crockett	Bells			SR 88 west (Main Street) – Alamo	Southern end of SR 88 concurrency
Crockett	Bells			SR 88 east (Central Avenue)	Northern end of SR 88 concurrency
Crockett	Bells			US 412 (SR 20) – Dyersburg, Jackson	Interchange
Crockett	Gadsden			SR 221 west – Alamo	Eastern terminus of SR 221
Middle Fork of the Forked Deer River				Bridge over Middle Fork of the Forked Deer River	
Gibson	Humboldt			US 70A Byp. east / US 79 Byp. north (SR 366 east)	Western terminus of US 70A Bypass and unsigned SR 366; southern terminus of US 79; interchange; bypass around the north side of downtown
Gibson	Humboldt			US 45W Bus. north (N Central Avenue/SR 5 north)	Southern end of wrong-way US 45W Business/SR 5 concurrency
Gibson	Humboldt			US 45W Bus. south (E Main Street/SR 5 south)	Northern end of wrong-way US 45W Business/SR 5 concurrency
Gibson	Humboldt			SR 152 (E Mitchell Street) – Maury City, Medina	
Gibson	Humboldt			US 45W / US 70A Byp. west / US 79 Byp. south (Highway 45 Bypass/SR 366) – Trenton, Jackson	Eastern terminus of US 70A Bypass; Northern terminus of US 79 Bypass
Gibson				SR 187 east – Milan	Western terminus of SR 187
Gibson	Gibson			SR 186 (Main Street) – Trenton, Three Way	
Gibson	Milan			US 45E (S 1st Street/SR 43/SR 77 west/SR 104) – Bradford, Trenton, Jackson, Lexington	Southern end of SR 77 concurrency
Gibson	Milan			SR 425 west (Middle Road)	Eastern terminus of SR 425
Carroll	Atwood			SR 220 south (Church Street)	Northern terminus of SR 220
Carroll	Atwood			US 70A east (SR 77 east) – McLemoresville, Huntingdon	Northern end of US 70A/SR 77 concurrency
Carroll	Trezevant			SR 105 (Main Street) – Bradford, McLemoresville	
Carroll				Bridge over the South Fork of the Obion River	
Carroll	McKenzie			SR 436 south (Cherrywood Avenue) – McLemoresville	Northern terminus of SR 436
Carroll	McKenzie			SR 124 (Cedar Street) – Downtown, Greenfield	
Carroll	McKenzie			SR 423 east (Shiloh Road)	Western terminus of SR 423
Carroll	McKenzie			SR 22 – Gleason, Dresden, Huntingdon	Interchange
Henry	Paris			SR 218 (Highway 218 Bypass)	Beltway around Paris
Henry	Paris			US 641 (Veterans Drive/Mineral Wells Avenue/SR 69) – Puryear, Downtown, Camden	
Henry	Paris			SR 356 west (E Woods Street) – Downtown	Eastern terminus of SR 356
Henry	Paris			SR 218 south (Highway 218 Bypass)	Southern end of SR 218 concurrency; beltway around Paris
Henry				SR 218 north (Buchanan Road) – Buchanan	Northern end of SR 218 concurrency
Henry				SR 140 west – Buchanan, Puryear	Eastern terminus of SR 140
Henry	Paris Landing State Park			SR 119 north – Murray, KY	Southern terminus of SR 119
Kentucky Lake/Tennessee River				Ned McWherter Memorial Bridge over Kentucky Lake/Tennessee River	
Stewart	Land Between the Lakes National Recreation Area			SR 232 south – McKinnon	Northern terminus of SR 232
Stewart	Dover			SR 461 north (The Trace) – Land Between the Lakes National Recreation Area	Southern terminus of SR 461
Stewart	Dover			SR 49 east (Spring Street) – Tennessee Ridge, Erin	Western terminus of SR 49
Stewart	Dover			Bridge over Cumberland River	
Stewart	Big Rock			SR 120 north (Cadiz Road) – Bumpus Mills, Cadiz, KY	Southern terminus of SR 120
Stewart				SR 46 south (Red Top Road) – Indian Mound, Cumberland City	Northern terminus of SR 46
Montgomery	Woodlawn			SR 233 south (Lylewood Road) – Cumberland City	Northern terminus of SR 233
Montgomery	Clarksville			SR 374 east (Paul B. Huff Memorial Parkway)	Western terminus of SR 374; partial Beltway around Clarksville
Montgomery	Clarksville			US 41A north (Fort Campbell Boulevard/SR 12 north) to I-24 – Oak Grove, KY, Hopkinsville, KY	Southern end of wrong-way US 41A/SR 12 concurrency; provides access to Fort Campbell
Montgomery	Clarksville			US 41A Byp. south (N Riverside Drive/SR 12 south/SR 13 south) / US 79 north (Kraft Street/SR 13 north) / SR 112 begins	Northern end of US 79/SR 12 concurrency; northern terminus of US 41A Bypass; western terminus of unsigned SR 112; southern end of SR 112 concurrency
Montgomery	Clarksville			SR 48 south (College Street)	Southern end of SR 48 concurrency
Montgomery	Clarksville			SR 48 north (College Street) to SR 374 / I-24	Northern end of SR 48 concurrency
Montgomery	Clarksville			SR 374 west (Richview Road)	Eastern terminus of SR 374; partial beltway around Clarksville
Montgomery	Clarksville			US 41A Byp. north (Highway 41A Bypass) / US 41A south (Madison Street/SR 112 east) – Pleasant View, Ashland City	Southern terminus of US 41A Bypass; northern end of wrong-way US 41A/SR 112 concurrency; SR 76 becomes signed; SR 76 switches cardinal directions from north-south to east-west
Montgomery	Sango			I-24 – Paducah, Nashville	I-24 exit 11
Montgomery	Port Royal			SR 238 north (Port Royal Road) – Guthrie, KY	Southern terminus of SR 238; provides access to Port Royal State Park
Sulphur Fork Creek				Bridge over Sulphur Fork Creek	
Robertson	Adams			SR 256 south (Cedar Hill Road) to I-24	Northern terminus of SR 256
Robertson	Adams			US 41 north (SR 11 north) – Guthrie, KY	Western end of US 41/SR 11 concurrency; SR 76 becomes unsigned; SR 76 turns secondary
Robertson	Springfield			US 431 north (Memorial Boulevard/SR 65 north) – Adairville, KY	Western end of US 431/SR 65 concurrency
Robertson	Springfield			US 41 south / US 431 south (Memorial Boulevard/SR 11 south/SR 65 south) / SR 49 west (5th Avenue) – Greenbrier, Whites Creek, Pleasant Hill	Eastern end of US 41/US 431/SR 11/SR 65 concurrency; western end of SR 49 concurrency
Robertson	Springfield			SR 49 east (5th Avenue) – Orlinda	Eastern end of SR 49 concurrency; SR 76 becomes signed
Robertson	White House			I-65 – Nashville, Louisville	I-65 exit 108
Robertson	White House			SR 258 south (Raymond Hirsch Parkway) to US 31W – Hendersonville	Northern terminus of SR 258
Robertson–Sumner county line	White House			US 31W south (SR 41 south) – Millersville, Goodlettsville	Western end of US 31W/SR 41 concurrency
Robertson–Sumner county line	White House			US 31W north (SR 41 north) – Franklin, KY	Eastern end of US 31W/SR 41 concurrency
Sumner				SR 25 – Cross Plains, Gallatin	
Sumner	Portland	231.44	372.47	SR 109 – Gallatin, Downtown, Mitchellville	Eastern terminus; SR 76 ends as a secondary highway
1.000 mi = 1.609 km; 1.000 km = 0.621 mi: Concurrency terminus
