= U.S. Route 79 in Tennessee =

U.S. highway section within the state of Tennessee

U.S. Route 79
- US 79 highlighted in red

Route information
- Maintained by TDOT
- Length: 209.83 mi (337.69 km)
- Existed: 1944–present

Major junctions
- West end: I-55 / US 61 / US 64 / US 70 / US 78 / US 79 at the Arkansas state line/Mississippi River in Memphis
- I-55 in Memphis; US 51 in downtown Memphis; I-40 in Memphis; US 64 in Bartlett; US 70 / US 70A in Brownsville; US 412 in Bells; US 45W in Humboldt; US 45E in Milan; US 641 in Paris; I-24 in Clarksville
- North end: US 79 at the Kentucky state line northeast of Clarksville

Location
- Country: United States
- State: Tennessee
- Counties: Shelby, Fayette, Tipton, Haywood, Crockett, Gibson, Carroll, Henry, Stewart, Montgomery

Highway system
- United States Numbered Highway System; List; Special; Divided; Tennessee State Routes; Interstate; US; State
← SR 78	→ SR 79

U.S. Route 79 (US 79) in Tennessee enters the state from Arkansas via the Memphis & Arkansas Bridge in Memphis, and runs northeast through western and the northwestern portions of middle Tennessee, and leaving the state into Kentucky northeast of Clarksville. Along the route, US 79 is accompanied with several concurrencies, including hidden designations, throughout its alignment in Tennessee.

== Route description ==
Map showing the route of US 79 in downtown Memphis.

=== Memphis to Brownsville ===
From I-55, US 79 continues to follow US 61/64/70 (SR 1) on E.H. Crump Boulevard. US 64/70/79 then turns north onto Danny Thomas Boulevard northward, then it makes a right turn onto Union Avenue, where US 51 (SR 3) gets involved in the concurrency until Bellevue Boulevard. US 64/70/79 then joins SR 277 northward until the U.S. routes turn onto Summer Avenue eastward. US 64 splits from US 70/79 at their intersection with SR 15 in Bartlett, in northeastern Shelby County.

US 79 continues to run concurrently with US 70 (SR 1) from here until Brownsville, in Haywood County. In Brownsville, US 70/79 joins the Ah Gray/C.A. Rawls Bypass with SR 19. The intersection with Anderson Avenue marks the beginning of US 79's long concurrency with SR 76, while the overlaps with SR 19 and US 70/SR 1 both end at the intersections with Jefferson Street and East Main Street, respectively. US 79/SR 76 begins a concurrency with US 70A at that point.

=== Brownsville to Paris Landing ===
US 79/70A (SR 76) continues northeastward to have major junctions with US 412, US 45W and US 45E in the towns of Bells, Humboldt, and Milan, respectively. US 70A becomes a standalone route in Atwood. US 79 continues northeast to McKenzie and Paris. US 79 is the main thoroughfare accessing Paris Landing State Park before crossing the Tennessee River.

=== Tennessee River to Kentucky state line ===
After entering Stewart County, US 79 becomes known as Donelson Parkway, and forms a portion of the southern boundary of the Land Between the Lakes National Recreation Area before entering Dover, where it crosses the Cumberland River, and then continues eastward to Clarksville. It then becomes known as Dover Road between the Stewart-Montgomery County line and the city of Clarksville.

US 79 then runs concurrently with US 41A on the northwestern side of Clarksville, and it then turns left to bypass the downtown area, while beginning its concurrency with SR 13 for the remainder of its path to the Kentucky state line. Wilma Rudolph Boulevard is the name given to the portion of U.S. Route 79 between the Red River (Lynnwood-Tarpley) bridge near the Kraft Street intersection and I-24’s exit 4 interchange.

The highway then enters Todd County, Kentucky after exiting the city of Clarksville. The state line coincides with the northern terminus of SR 13.

=== Concurrency list ===
U.S. 79 runs concurrently with the following interstate and U.S. routes:

- I-55/US 61/US 64 from Arkansas state line to Exit 12,
- US 70 from Arkansas state line to Brownsville
- US 51 in downtown Memphis
- US 70A from Brownsville to Atwood, and
- US 41A (Providence Blvd.) from west Clarksville to downtown Clarksville

Additionally, all areas of US 79 run concurrently with Tennessee state routes throughout its course through the state as “hidden,” or secret designations as the state routes are not signed. They include:

- SR 1 from Memphis to Brownsville (in association with US 70)
- SR 3 in downtown Memphis (in association with US 51)
- SR 59 from Braden to Mason
- SR 76 from Brownsville to Clarksville
- SR 77 from Milan to Atwood
- SR 12 in Clarksville (in association with US 41A)
- SR 48 through Clarksville
- SR 13 from downtown Clarksville to the Kentucky state line

== History ==
US 79 did not have any presence in Tennessee or southern Kentucky until it was routed into the state in 1944. Until then, the route ended in West Memphis, Arkansas, and US 79's current route in Tennessee was signed solely as SR 76 from Brownsville to Clarksville, and SR 13 from Clarksville to the Kentucky line.

The section of US 79 in Clarksville between the Lynnwood-Tarpley Bridge and the I-24 interchange was originally named the Guthrie Highway, for nearby Guthrie, Kentucky, until 1994, when it was renamed Wilma Rudolph Boulevard. This was done to honor Wilma Rudolph, an Olympic runner from Clarksville, who won three gold medals in the 1960 Rome Summer Olympic Games in Italy.

== Major intersections ==
The mileposts listed in the following table is only an estimated calculation. Actual mile markers may vary and subject to change due to any future reroutings that may occur.

County	Location	mi	km	Destinations	Notes
Mississippi River		0.00	0.00	I-55 north / US 61 north / US 64 west / US 70 west / US 79 south – West Memphis, St. Louis, MO	Continuation into Arkansas
Mississippi River		0.00	0.00	Memphis & Arkansas Bridge; Arkansas state line; begin concurrency with unsigned SR 1	
see U.S. Route 70
Haywood	Brownsville	65.4	105.3	US 70 east (East Main Street/SR 1 east) – Jackson	Eastern end of US 70/SR 1 concurrency; western end of US 70A concurrency; western terminus of US 70A; concurrency with unsigned SR 76 began during US 79’s concurrency with US 70 and SR 1.
Haywood	Brownsville	66.6	107.2	SR 369 south (North Washington Avenue) – Downtown Brownsville	Northern terminus of SR 369
Crockett	Bells	77.7	125.0	SR 88 west (Main Street) – Alamo	Southern end of SR 88 concurrency
Crockett	Bells	77.9	125.4	SR 88 east (Central Avenue)	Northern end of SR 88 concurrency
Crockett	Bells	79.3– 79.5	127.6– 127.9	US 412 (SR 20) – Dyersburg, Jackson	Interchange
Crockett	Gadsden	84.8	136.5	SR 221 west (Quincy Street) – Alamo	Eastern terminus of SR 221
Gibson	Humboldt	88.9	143.1	US 79 Byp. north / US 70A Byp. east (SR 366 east)	Western terminus of US 79 Bypass/US 70A Bypass/SR 366
Gibson	Humboldt	90.1	145.0	US 45W Bus. north (Central Avenue/SR 5 north)	Southern end of US 45W Business concurrency
Gibson	Humboldt	90.6	145.8	US 45W Bus. south (Main Street/SR 5 south)	Northern end of US 45W Business/SR 5 concurrency
Gibson	Humboldt	90.9	146.3	SR 152 (Mitchell Street) – Medina	
Gibson	Humboldt	92.0	148.1	US 45W / US 79 Byp. / US 70A Byp. (SR 366) – Union City, Jackson	Eastern terminus of US 79 Byp./US 70A Bypass
Gibson		93.8	151.0	SR 187 east	Western terminus of SR 187
Gibson	Gibson	96.0	154.5	SR 186 (Main Street) – Trenton, Three Way	
Gibson	Milan	101.9	164.0	US 45E (South 1st Street/SR 43/SR 77 west/SR 104) – Martin, Jackson	Southern end of SR 77 concurrency
Gibson	Milan	103.8	167.0	SR 425 west (Middle Road)	Eastern terminus of SR 425
Carroll	Atwood	107.7	173.3	SR 220 south (Church Street)	Northern terminus of SR 220
Carroll	Atwood	108.3	174.3	US 70A east (SR 77 east) – Huntingdon	Northern end of US 70A/SR 77 concurrency
Carroll	Trezevant	121.8	196.0	SR 105 (Main Street) – Bradford, McLemoresville	
Carroll	McKenzie	131.5	211.6	SR 436 south (Cherrywood Avenue) – McLemoresville	Northern terminus of SR 436
Carroll	McKenzie	132.0	212.4	SR 124 west (Cedar Street/Old McKenzie Road) – Downtown, Greenfield	
Carroll	McKenzie	132.4	213.1	SR 423 east (Shiloh Road)	Western terminus of SR 423
Carroll	McKenzie	133.4– 133.6	214.7– 215.0	SR 22 – Dresden, Huntingdon	Interchange
Henry	Paris	146.4	235.6	SR 218 (Highway 218 Bypass)	Beltway around Paris
Henry	Paris	148.2	238.5	US 641 (Veterans Drive/Mineral Wells Avenue/SR 69) – Paris Business District, Camden	
Henry	Paris	149.0	239.8	SR 356 west (East Wood Street)	Old US 79/SR 76; eastern terminus of SR 356
Henry		152.3	245.1	SR 218 west (Highway 218 Bypass)	Southern end of SR 218 concurrency; beltway around Paris
Henry		155.3	249.9	SR 218 east (Buchanan Road) – Buchanan	Northern end of SR 218 concurrency
Henry		162.4	261.4	SR 140 west – Buchanan	Eastern terminus of SR 140
Henry	Paris Landing State Park	165.0	265.5	SR 119 north – Murray (KY)	Southern terminus of SR 119
Tennessee River (Kentucky Lake)		166.1– 166.8	267.3– 268.4	Governor Ned R. McWherter Bridge	
Stewart	Land Between the Lakes National Recreation Area	170.8	274.9	SR 232 south – McKinnon	Northern terminus of SR 232
Stewart	Dover	177.6	285.8	SR 461 north (The Trace) – Land Between the Lakes National Recreation Area	Southern terminus of SR 461
Stewart	Dover	179.6	289.0	SR 49 east (Spring Street) – Tennessee Ridge, Erin	Western terminus of SR 49
Stewart	Dover	166.1– 166.8	267.3– 268.4	US 79 Bridge over Cumberland River	
Stewart	Big Rock	188.5	303.4	SR 120 north – Bumpus Mills, Cadiz (KY)	Southern terminus of SR 120
Stewart		192.0	309.0	SR 46 (Red Top Road) – Cumberland City	Western terminus of SR 46
Montgomery	Woodlawn	199.8	321.5	SR 233 south (Lylewood Road) – Cumberland City	Northern terminus of SR 233
Montgomery		203.9	328.1	SR 374 east (Paul B. Huff Memorial Parkway)	Western terminus of SR 374; interchange; partial beltway around Clarksville
Montgomery	Clarksville	207.6	334.1	US 41A north (Fort Campbell Boulevard/SR 12 north) – Oak Grove, Fort Campbell, Hopkinsville	Southern end of US 41A/SR 12 concurrency
Montgomery	Clarksville	209.4	337.0	US 41A south (N 2nd Street/SR 76 north) / US 41A Byp. (N Riverside Drive/SR 12 south/SR 13 south) – Downtown Clarksville	Northern terminus of US 41A Bypass; Southern end of SR 13 concurrency; northern end of US 41A/SR 12 concurrency
Montgomery	Clarksville	211.1	339.7	SR 48 south (College Street)	Southern end of SR 48 concurrency
Montgomery	Clarksville	212.4	341.8	Dunbar Cave Road – Dunbar Cave State Park	
Montgomery	Clarksville	213.3	343.3	SR 48 north (Trenton Road) – Trenton, KY	Northern end of SR 48 concurrency
Montgomery	Clarksville	214.1	344.6	SR 374 (101st Airborne Division Parkway)	Single-point urban interchange; partial beltway around Clarksville
Montgomery	Clarksville	216.2– 216.4	347.9– 348.3	I-24 – Nashville, Paducah	I-24 Exit 4
Montgomery		221.7	356.8	US 79 north (Russellville Road) – Guthrie, Russellville	Continuation into Kentucky; northern end of SR 13 concurrency
1.000 mi = 1.609 km; 1.000 km = 0.621 mi: Concurrency terminus; Incomplete access

== See also ==
- Tennessee State Route 1
- Tennessee State Route 76

U.S. Route 79
Previous state: Arkansas	Tennessee	Next state: Kentucky
