= U.S. Route 70A (Tennessee) =

U.S. Highway in Tennessee

U.S. Route 70A

Route information
- Maintained by TDOT
- Length: 61.7 mi (99.3 km)

Major junctions
- West end: US 70 / US 79 in Brownsville
- US 412 in Bells; US 45W / US 70A Byp. / US 79 Byp. in Humboldt; US 45E in Milan; US 79 in Atwood; SR 22 / SR 22 Bus. in Huntingdon
- East end: US 70 / US 70 Bus. in Huntingdon

Location
- Country: United States
- State: Tennessee
- Counties: Haywood, Crockett, Gibson, Carroll

Highway system
- United States Numbered Highway System; List; Special; Divided; Tennessee State Routes; Interstate; US; State
← US 70S	→ SR 70

U.S. Route 70 Alternate (US 70A) is a 61.7-mile-long (99.3 km) alternate route to US 70 between Brownsville, and Huntingdon in West Tennessee. Signage along this route, and on most maps, show it as US 70A and not US 70 Alternate.

== Route description ==
=== Haywood County ===
US 70A begins in Haywood County in Brownsville at an intersection with US 70/US 79/SR 1/SR 76 just east of downtown. It heads north, concurrent with US 79 and unsigned SR 76, along Dupree Street to bypass downtown along its east side to come to an intersection with SR 369, where the highway turns east along N Washington Avenue to leave Brownsville and pass through farmland and rural areas for several miles before crossing into Crockett County via a bridge over the South Fork of the Forked Deer River.

=== Crockett County ===
US 70A/US 79 almost immediately enter Bells, where they pass through downtown along High Street and have an intersection with SR 88. They then have an interchange with US 412/SR 20 before leaving Bells and continuing northeast to pass through Fruitvale and Gadsden, where they have an intersection with SR 221, before crossing into Gibson County via a bridge over the Middle Fork of the Forked Deer River.

=== Gibson County ===
They immediately enter Humboldt and have an interchange with US 70A Bypass/US 79 Bypass/SR 366. US 70A/US 79 pass through neighborhoods along W Main Street to enter downtown, where they become concurrent with US 45W Business/SR 5. US 70A/US 79 now split off along Eastend Drive to pass through neighborhoods and have an intersection with SR 152 before having another intersection with US 70A, US 79 Bypass, SR 366, and US 45W. The highway then leaves Humboldt and continues northeast through rural areas, where they have an intersection with SR 187. US 70A/US 79 now pass through Gibson, where they have an intersection with SR 186, before crossing the North Fork of the Forked Deer River and entering Milan. They pass through the city as Van Hook Street, where they have an intersection with US 45E/SR 43/SR 77/SR 104, with unsigned SR 77 becoming concurrent with US 70A/US 79/SR 76 here. US 70A/US 79 have an intersection with SR 425 before leaving Milan passing through rural farmland, where they cross over the Rutherford Fork of the Obion River shortly before crossing into Carroll County.

=== Carroll County ===
US 70A/US 79 immediately enter the town of Atwood, where they pass through the town along Main Street and have an intersection with SR 220 before coming to a Y-Intersection where US 70A and US 79 split, with US 70A following SR 77 east while US 79 follows SR 76 north. US 70A has an intersection with SR 220 Alternate before leaving Atwood and continuing east to pass through McLemoresville, where it has an intersection with SR 105. It has an intersection with SR 436 before passing through more wooded terrain for a few miles to enter Huntingdon at an intersection with SR 22. SR 22 joins the concurrency and they turn north to bypass downtown along its west side on Veterans Drive before coming to an intersection with SR 22 Business, where SR 22 splits and heads north. US 70A curves to the east along the city’s north side for a couple of miles, where SR 77 splits off and US 70A begins following unsigned SR 364. US 70A now turns south for a short distance before coming to an end at an intersection with US 70 Business and US 70 (SR 1/SR 364) on Huntingdon’s east side.

== Major intersections ==
County	Location	mi	km	Destinations	Notes
Haywood	Brownsville	0.0	0.0	US 70 / US 79 south (S Dupree Street/E Main Street/SR 1/SR 76 south) – Stanton, Jackson	Western terminus; western end of US 79/SR 76 overlap
Haywood	Brownsville	1.2	1.9	SR 369 west (N Washington Avenue)	Eastern terminus of SR 369
South Fork of the Forked Deer River		10.5	16.9	Bridge over the South Fork of the Forked Deer River	
Crockett	Bells	12.3	19.8	SR 88 west (Main Street) – Alamo	Western end of SR 88 concurrency
Crockett	Bells	12.5	20.1	SR 88 east (Central Avenue)	Eastern end of SR 88 concurrency
Crockett	Bells	13.9– 14.2	22.4– 22.9	US 412 (SR 20) – Dyersburg, Jackson	Interchange
Crockett	Gadsden	19.4	31.2	SR 221 west (Quincy Street) – Alamo	Eastern terminus of SR 221
Middle Fork of the Forked Deer River		23.3 23.4	37.5 37.7	Bridge over the Middle Fork of the Forked Deer River	
Gibson	Humboldt	23.6– 23.7	38.0– 38.1	US 70A Byp. east / US 79 Byp. north (SR 366 east) – Gibson, Milan	Western terminus of US 70A Bypass and SR 366; southern terminus of US 79 Bypass; interchange
Gibson	Humboldt	24.8	39.9	US 45W Bus. north (N Central Avenue/SR 5 north)	Western end of US 45W Business/SR 5 concurrency
Gibson	Humboldt	25.3	40.7	US 45W Bus. south (E Main Street/SR 5 south)	Eastern end of US 45W Business/SR 5 concurrency
Gibson	Humboldt	25.6	41.2	SR 152 (E Mitchell Street)	
Gibson	Humboldt	26.7	43.0	US 45W / US 70A Byp. west / US 79 Byp. south (SR 366) – Trenton, Three Way, Jackson	Eastern terminus of US 70A Bypass; northern terminus of US 79 Bypass
Gibson		28.4	45.7	SR 187 east	Western terminus of SR 187
Gibson	Gibson	30.6	49.2	SR 186 (Main Street) – Trenton, Three Way	
Gibson		32.9	52.9	Bridge over the North Fork of the Forked Deer River	
Gibson	Milan	36.6	58.9	US 45E (S 1st Street/SR 43/SR 77 west/SR 104) – Bradford, Medina	Western end of SR 77 concurrency
Gibson	Milan	38.4	61.8	SR 425 west (Middle Road)	Eastern terminus of SR 425
Gibson		39.6– 39.7	63.7– 63.9	Rutherford Fork of the Obion River	
Carroll	Atwood	42.4	68.2	SR 220 south (Church Street) – Lavinia	Northern terminus of SR 220
Carroll	Atwood	42.9	69.0	US 79 north (E Main Street/SR 76 north) – Trezevant, McKenzie	Eastern end of US 79/SR 76 concurrency
Carroll	Atwood	43.5	70.0	SR 220 Alt. south (Norris Robinson Loop)	Northern terminus of SR 220 Alternate
Carroll	McLemoresville	48.6	78.2	SR 105 west (W College Street) – Trezevant	Eastern terminus of SR 105
Carroll		51.0	82.1	SR 436 north – McKenzie	Southern terminus of SR 436
Carroll	Huntingdon	56.8	91.4	SR 22 south (Veterans Drive S) – Clarksburg, Lexington	Western end of SR 22 concurrency
Carroll	Huntingdon	58.3	93.8	SR 22 north / SR 22 Bus. south (Paris Street) – McKenzie, Downtown	Eastern end of SR 22 concurrency; northern terminus of SR 22 Business
Carroll	Huntingdon	60.2	96.9	SR 77 east (Gordon Browning Highway) – Paris SR 364 begins	Eastern end of SR 77 concurrency; eastern terminus of SR 364; western end of wrong-way SR 364 concurrency
Carroll	Huntingdon	61.7	99.3	US 70 / US 70 Bus. west (E Main Street/Veteran Drive S/SR 1/SR 364 west) – Jackson, Downtown, Hollow Rock, Bruceton	Eastern terminus of US 70A and US 70 Business; interchange; unsigned SR 364 continues along US 70 west
1.000 mi = 1.609 km; 1.000 km = 0.621 mi: Concurrency terminus

== Humboldt bypass route ==
U.S. Route 70A Bypass
- Location: Humboldt, Tennessee
- Length: 3.9 mi (6.3 km)

U.S. Route 70A Bypass (US 70 Bypass or US 70A Byp.) is a bypass route of US 70A in Humboldt, Tennessee. It runs concurrently with US 79 Bypass and unsigned SR 366 for its entire length.

The highway begins as a two-lane highway at an interchange with US 70A/US 79 (W Main Street/SR 76 at the southwestern edge of town. It heads north through some industrial areas, where it has an intersection with SR 152. The highway then curves to the east through more industrial areas to cross a railroad overpass and enter a business district and come to an intersection with US 45W and US 45W Business (N Central Avenue/SR 5), where it widens to a four-lane highway and US 45W joins the highway. They then pass through some neighborhoods, where they cross over another railroad overpass, before US 70A Bypass/US 79 Bypass come to an end at an intersection with US 70A/US 79 (Eastend Drive/SR 76), with the Humboldt Bypass, and unsigned SR 366, continuing south along US 45W.

The entire route is in Humboldt, Gibson County.

mi	km	Destinations	Notes
0.0	0.0	US 70A / US 79 (W Main Street/SR 76) – McKenzie, Gadsden, Downtown	Western terminus of US 70A Bypass and unsigned SR 366; southern terminus of US 79 Bypass; interchange; western end of US 79 Bypass/SR 366 concurrency
1.1	1.8	SR 152 (McLin Street) – Maury City, Downtown	
2.8	4.5	US 45W north / US 45W Bus. south (N Central Avenue/SR 5) – Trenton, Downtown	Western end of US 45W concurrency; northern terminus of US 45W Business
3.9	6.3	US 70A / US 79 (Eastend Drive/SR 76) – Downtown, Gibson, Milan US 45W south (SR 366 east) – Three Way, Jackson	Eastern terminus of US 70A Bypass; northern terminus of US 79 Bypass
1.000 mi = 1.609 km; 1.000 km = 0.621 mi: Concurrency terminus
