= Tennessee State Route 220 =

State highway in Tennessee, United States

State Route 220
- SR 220; mainline in red, alternate route in blue

Route information
- Maintained by TDOT
- Length: 14.2 mi (22.9 km)
- Existed: July 1, 1983–present

Major junctions
- South end: US 70 / SR 104 in Cedar Grove
- SR 104 near Lavinia
- North end: US 70A / US 79 in Atwood

Location
- Country: United States
- State: Tennessee
- Counties: Carroll

Highway system
- Tennessee State Routes; Interstate; US; State
← SR 219	→ SR 221

State Route 220 (SR 220) is a 14.2-mile-long (22.9 km) state highway that travels entirely within Carroll County in West Tennessee.

== Route description ==
SR 220 begins at an intersection with US 70/SR 1/SR 104 (Broadway of America) in the community of Cedar Grove. It travels to the west and curves to the northwest. After a westward jog through Lavinia, it turns to the north-northeast, along the eastern edge of the Milan Army Ammunition Plant. It briefly has a concurrency with SR 104 in the community of Whitthorne. The highway then stairsteps its way to the northwest to the town of Atwood where the route meets its northern terminus, an intersection with US 70A/US 79 /SR 76/SR 77 (Main Street).

== Major intersections ==
The entire route is in Carroll County.

Location	mi	km	Destinations	Notes
Cedar Grove	0.0	0.0	US 70 / SR 104 (Broadway of America/SR 1) – Jackson, Huntingdon	Southern terminus
Whitthorne	8.8	14.2	SR 104 west – Milan	Southern end of SR 104 concurrency
Whitthorne	8.9	14.3	SR 104 east – Hopewell	Northern end of SR 104 concurrency
Atwood	13.3	21.4	SR 220 Alt. north (Johnson Road)	Southern terminus of SR 220 Alternate
Atwood	14.2	22.9	US 70A / US 79 (Main Street/SR 76/SR 77) – Milan, Trezevant, McLemoresville, Huntingdon	Northern terminus
1.000 mi = 1.609 km; 1.000 km = 0.621 mi: Concurrency terminus

== Alternate route ==
State Route 220A
- Location: Atwood
- Length: 1.5 mi (2.4 km)

SR 220 is one of only three Tennessee State Routes that have alternate routes. State Route 220 Alternate (SR 220 Alt. or SR 220A) is an alternate route that travels from the SR 220 mainline on the south side of Atwood to US 70A on the east side of town. It is also unusual in that it is not posted with the "A" suffix, as most alternate routes are in Tennessee. Its east–west portion is known as Johnson Road, and its north–south portion is known as Norris Robinson Loop.

SR 220 Alt. begins at an intersection with the SR 220 mainline (Church Street) in the southeastern part of Atwood. Less than 500 feet (150 m) later, it leaves the city limits of town. At Norris Robinson Loop, the highway turns left and follows that road until they meet their northern terminus, an intersection with US 70A/SR 77 in the eastern part of town.

The entire route is in Atwood, Carroll County.

mi	km	Destinations	Notes
0.0	0.0	SR 220 (Church Street)	Southern terminus
1.5	2.4	US 70A (SR 77) – Milan, Downtown, McLemoresville, Huntingdon	Northern terminus
1.000 mi = 1.609 km; 1.000 km = 0.621 mi

== See also ==
- List of state routes in Tennessee
