= Tennessee State Route 436 =

Highway in Tennessee

State Route 436
- TN 436 highlighted in red

Route information
- Maintained by TDOT
- Length: 9.8 mi (15.8 km)

Major junctions
- South end: US 70A near McLemoresville
- North end: US 79 in McKenzie

Location
- Country: United States
- State: Tennessee
- Counties: Carroll

Highway system
- Tennessee State Routes; Interstate; US; State
← SR 435	→ SR 437

State Route 436 (SR 436) is a 9.8-mile-long (15.8 km) north–south state highway in Carroll County, Tennessee. It serves as a connector between the town of McLemoresville and the city of McKenzie.

== Route description ==
SR 436 begins just east of McLemoresville at an intersection with US 70A/SR 77. It winds its way north through farmland for several miles before passing through some wooded areas, where it crosses a bridge over the South Fork of the Obion River. The highway then winds its way northwest through farmland for several more miles before entering McKenzie along Cherrywood Avenue. SR 436 passes through some neighborhoods before coming to an end at an intersection with US 79/SR 76 just south of downtown. The entire route of SR 436 is a two-lane highway.

== Major intersections ==
The entire route is in Carroll County.

Location	mi	km	Destinations	Notes
	0.0	0.0	US 70A (SR 77) – McLemoresville, Huntingdon	Southern terminus
	4.1– 4.2	6.6– 6.8	Ewell Bouldin Bridge over the South Fork of the Obion River	
McKenzie	9.8	15.8	US 79 (Highland Drive/SR 76) – Trezevant, Henry	Northern terminus
1.000 mi = 1.609 km; 1.000 km = 0.621 mi
