= Tennessee State Route 423 =

State highway in Tennessee, United States

State Route 423
- TN 423 highlighted in red

Route information
- Maintained by TDOT
- Length: 10.8 mi (17.4 km)

Major junctions
- West end: US 79 in McKenzie
- SR 22 in McKenzie
- East end: SR 77 in Mixie

Location
- Country: United States
- State: Tennessee
- Counties: Carroll

Highway system
- Tennessee State Routes; Interstate; US; State
← SR 422	→ SR 424

State Route 423 (SR 423) is a 10.8-mile-long (17.4 km) state highway north–south state highway in northern Carroll County, Tennessee. It connects the city of Mckenzie with the community of Mixie.

== Route description ==
SR 423 begins in McKenzie at an intersection with US 79 (SR 76) just east of downtown. It heads southeast through neighborhoods as Shiloh Road to have an intersection with SR 22 before leaving McKenzie and continuing east through rural areas. It winds its way through farmland for several miles, where it becomes Macedonia-Rice Store Road and crosses a bridge over a creek, before passing through wooded and slightly hilly terrain. The highway then reenters farmland as it enters Mixie, shortly before it comes to an end at an intersection with SR 77. The entire route of SR 423 is a two-lane highway.

== Major intersections ==
The entire route is in Carroll County.

Location	mi	km	Destinations	Notes
McKenzie	0.0	0.0	US 79 (Highland Drive/SR 76) – Trezevant, Henry	Western terminus
McKenzie	1.1	1.8	SR 22 – Gleason, Huntingdon	
Mixie	10.8	17.4	SR 77 (Gordon Browning Highway) – Huntingdon, Paris	Eastern terminus
1.000 mi = 1.609 km; 1.000 km = 0.621 mi
