= Tennessee State Route 366 =

Highway in Tennessee

State Route 366

Route information
- Maintained by TDOT
- Length: 5.48 mi (8.82 km)
- Existed: July 1, 1983–present

Major junctions
- West end: US 70A / US 79 in Humboldt
- SR 152 in Humboldt; US 45W / US 45W Bus. in Humboldt; US 70A / US 79 in Humboldt; SR 152 in Humboldt
- East end: US 45W / US 45W Bus. in Humboldt

Location
- Country: United States
- State: Tennessee
- Counties: Gibson

Highway system
- Tennessee State Routes; Interstate; US; State
← SR 365	→ SR 367

State Route 366 (SR 366) is the unsigned designation for the 5.48-mile-long (8.82 km) northern beltway around the city of Humboldt in Gibson County, Tennessee. Throughout its length, the highway is signed as U.S. Route 45W (US 45W), US 70A Bypass, and US 79 Bypass.

== Route description ==
The highway begins as a two-lane highway at an interchange with US 70A/US 79 (W Main Street/SR 76 at the southwestern edge of town. It heads north through some industrial areas, where it has an intersection with SR 152. The highway then curves to the east through more industrial areas to cross a railroad overpass and enter a business district and come to an intersection with US 45W and US 45W Business (N Central Avenue/SR 5), where it widens to a four-lane highway and US 45W joins the highway. They then pass through some neighborhoods, where they cross over another railroad overpass, before US 70A Bypass/US 79 Bypass come to an end at an intersection with US 70A/US 79 (Eastend Drive/SR 76), with the Humboldt Bypass, and unsigned SR 366, continuing south along US 45W. The highway now curves to the south and passes through more rural areas, where it has an intersection with SR 152 (E Mitchell Street), shortly before coming to an end at an intersection with US 45W Business (E Main Street/SR 5), with the road continuing south towards Three Way as US 45W (SR 5).

== Major intersections ==
The entire route is in Humboldt, Gibson County.

mi	km	Destinations	Notes
0.0	0.0	US 70A / US 79 (W Main Street/SR 76) – McKenzie, Gadsden, Downtown US 70A Byp. begins / US 79 Byp. ends	Western terminus of US 70A Bypass and unsigned SR 366; southern terminus of US 79 Bypass; interchange; western end of US 70A Bypass/US 79 Bypass concurrency
1.1	1.8	SR 152 (McLin Street) – Maury City, Downtown	
2.8	4.5	US 45W north / US 45W Bus. south (N Central Avenue/SR 5) – Trenton, Downtown	Western end of US 45W concurrency; northern terminus of US 45W Business
3.9	6.3	US 70A / US 79 (Eastend Drive/SR 76) – Downtown, Gibson, Milan US 70A Byp. ends / US 79 Byp. ends	Eastern terminus of US 70A Bypass; northern terminus of US 79 Bypass
5.1	8.2	SR 152 (E Mitchell Street) – Medina, Downtown	
5.5	8.9	US 45W Bus. north (E Main Street/SR 5 north) – Downtown US 45W south (SR 5 south) – Three Way, Jackson	Eastern terminus of SR 366; southern terminus of US 45W Business
1.000 mi = 1.609 km; 1.000 km = 0.621 mi: Concurrency terminus
