= List of special state routes in Tennessee =

A special Tennessee State Route (neologistically a bannered Tennessee State Route) is a special route, or auxiliary routes of the system of state highways in the state of Tennessee.

Like the special U.S. routes, special state routes, as the name suggests, are typically marked with an auxiliary sign (or "banner") above (or occasionally below) the route shield, or a suffix letter after the number in the shield, except for the alternate routes. Alternate auxiliaries of certain secondary routes usually have the letter “A” beside the main route number.

The list below includes the route numbers and locations in which the special routes are located.

== Special primary routes ==
=== SR 13 ===
- SR 13 Spur – Waverly, Humphreys County

=== SR 22 ===
- SR 22A – McNairy, Chester, and Henderson Counties.
- SR 22 Business – Huntingdon, Carroll County
- SR 22 Bypass – Huntingdon, Carroll County

=== SR 52 ===
- SR 52 Truck – Celina, Clay County

=== SR 55 ===
- SR 55 Business – McMinnville, Warren County

== Special secondary routes ==
=== SR 69 ===
- SR 69A – Camden, Benton County north to Paris, Henry County

=== SR 73 ===
- SR 73 Scenic – Townsend, Blount County east to Sevier County (designated officially as SR 337)

=== SR 82 ===
- SR 82 Bypass – Shelbyville, Bedford County

=== SR 220 ===
- SR 220A – near Atwood, Carroll County

== See also ==
- List of state routes in Tennessee
