= Tennessee State Route 77 =

Highway in Tennessee

State Route 77
- SR 77; primary in red, secondary in blue, unsigned in green

Route information
- Maintained by TDOT
- Length: 84.86 mi (136.57 km)
- Existed: October 1, 1923–present

Major junctions
- West end: Future I-69 / US 51 in Newbern
- US 45W / SR 185 in Dyer; US 45W / SR 54 / SR 104 in Trenton; US 45E in Milan; US 45E / US 79 / US 70A / SR 104 in Milan; US 79 in Atwood; SR 22 in Huntingdon; US 70A in Huntingdon; SR 218 in Paris
- East end: US 641 in Paris

Location
- Country: United States
- State: Tennessee
- Counties: Dyer, Gibson, Carroll, Henry

Highway system
- Tennessee State Routes; Interstate; US; State
← SR 76	→ US 78

State Route 77 (SR 77), is an east–west state highway in the U.S. state of Tennessee. The 84.86-mile-long (136.57 km) route traverses the flat farmland of West Tennessee.

== Route description ==
=== Dyer County ===
SR 77 begins as a secondary 2-lane highway in Dyer County at an interchange with US 51/SR 3 (Future I-69) in Newbern. It travels along the northern edge of town before having an intersection with SR 211 (Old US 51), just northeast of downtown, before leaving Newbern and continuing east through farmland and rural areas to cross into Gibson County.

=== Gibson County ===
SR 77 passes through Yorkville, where it has an intersection with SR 188 before passing through the community of Hopewell to enter Dyer. SR 77 then has an interchange with US 45W (SR 5), which it becomes concurrent with, while the road continues east into downtown as SR 185. They go southeast as a 4-lane divided highway to leave Dyer and enter Trenton, where they have an intersection with SR 367 (Old US 45W). The highway then narrows to 2-lanes as it bypasses Trenton on its eastern side, where SR 54 joins the concurrency. They then cross a bridge over the North Fork of the Forked Deer River and come to an intersection with SR 104, where SR 77 leaves US 45W/SR 5/SR 54 to have an unsigned concurrency with SR 104, with SR 77 being the one that is signed. SR 77, becoming a primary route at this point, continues eastward to pass by the Gibson County Airport before entering Milan. The highway passes through neighborhoods before entering downtown along N Main Street before turning left onto Front Street to come to an intersection with US 45E (SR 43), where they become concurrent with that highway and SR 77 becomes unsigned. They go south along S 1st Street, a 4-lane undivided highway, though downtown before coming to an intersection with US 79/US 70A (SR 76/Van Hook Street). SR 77 then leaves US 45E/SR 43/SR 104 and follows US 79/US 70A. They pass through a neighborhood before having an intersection with SR 425 (Middle Road) before leaving Milan and widening to a divided highway for a short distance before narrowing to 2-lanes and crossing into Carroll County.

=== Carroll County ===
US 79/US 70A/SR 76/SR 77 immediately enter Atwood and has an intersection with SR 220. They then come a Y-Intersection, where US 70A departs from US 79/SR 76, and SR 77 follows US 70A as its companion as a hidden, or secret designation. US 70A/SR 77 goes east to have an intersection with SR 220A before they leave Atwood and pass through rural areas before passing through McLemoresville, where they have an intersection with SR 105. US 70A/SR 77 then have an intersection with SR 436 before entering Huntingdon. They then come to an intersection with the Huntingdon Bypass (SR 22), where they turn north to become concurrent with it. They then turn east and have an intersection with SR 22 Business, where SR 22 splits off and goes north. This section of SR 22 is signed as a bypass route of SR 22, even it is the main route of SR 22. US 70A/SR 77 go east along the northern edge of the city before SR 77 splits off and goes north while US 70A continues east along SR 364. SR 77 reverts into a signed secondary route, becoming a north–south route for the remainder of its course. SR 77 then leaves Huntingdon as a 2-lane highway and has intersections with SR 219 and SR 423 before crossing into Henry County.

=== Henry County ===
SR 77 then has an intersection with SR 114 at a Y-Intersection before passing through rural areas to enter Paris at an intersection with SR 218 (Paris Bypass). The highway then enters a business district before coming to an intersection with, where it reaches the northern terminus, US 641 (SR 69) on the southeast side of the city.

== Major intersections ==
County	Location	mi	km	Destinations	Notes
Dyer	Newbern	0.00	0.00	Future I-69 / US 51 (SR 3) – Dyersburg, Union City	Western terminus; interchange; SR 77 begins as a secondary highway
Dyer	Newbern			SR 211 (Washington Street) – Trimble, Dyersburg	Old US 51
Gibson	Yorkville			SR 188 south (Nebo Yorkville Road) – Neboville, Central	Northern terminus of SR 188
Gibson	Dyer			US 45W north (SR 5 north) / SR 185 east (Yorkville Street) – Union City, Dyer Business District	Western terminus of SR 185; western end of US 45W/SR 5 concurrency; interchange
Gibson	Trenton			SR 367 south (N College Street) – Trenton Business District	Northern terminus of SR 367
Gibson	Trenton			SR 54 east (Halliburton Street) – Bradford	Western end of SR 54 concurrency
Gibson	Trenton			US 45W south / SR 54 west (Highway 45 Bypass South/SR 5 south) / SR 104 west (E Eaton Street) – Jackson, Dyersburg	Eastern end of US 45W/SR 5 and SR 54 concurrencies; western end of unsigned SR 104 concurrency; SR 77 becomes a primary highway
Gibson	Milan			US 45E north (S 1st Street/SR 43 north) – Martin	Western end of US 45W/SR 43 concurrency; SR 77 becomes unsigned
Gibson	Milan			US 70A west / US 79 south (Van Hook Street/SR 76 south) / US 45E south / SR 104 east (S 1st Street/SR 43 south) – Humboldt, Memphis, Jackson	Eastern end of US 45E/SR 43/SR 104 concurrency; western end of US 70A/US 79/SR 76 concurrency
Gibson	Milan			SR 425 west (Middle Road)	Eastern terminus of SR 425
Carroll	Atwood			SR 220 south (Church Street)	Northern terminus of SR 220
Carroll	Atwood			US 79 north (E Main Street/SR 76 north) – Paris, Clarksville	Eastern end of US 79/SR 76 concurrency
Carroll	Atwood			SR 220A south (Norris Robinson Loop)	Northern terminus of SR 220A
Carroll	McLemoresville			SR 105 west (W College Street) – Trezevant	Eastern terminus of SR 105
Carroll				SR 436 north (Reedy Creek Road)	Southern terminus of SR 436
Carroll	Huntingdon			SR 22 south (S Veterans Drive) – Lexington	Western end of SR 22 concurrency
Carroll	Huntingdon			SR 22 north (Huntingdon-McKenzie Highway) / SR 22 Bus. south (Paris Street) – Dresden, Martin, Downtown Huntingdon	Eastern end of SR 22 concurrency; northern terminus of SR 22 Business
Carroll	Huntingdon			US 70A east (Veterans Drive N/SR 364 east)	Western terminus of SR 364; eastern end of US 70A concurrency; SR 77 becomes a signed secondary highway
Carroll				SR 219 south (Rosser Road)	Northern terminus of SR 219
Carroll	Mixie			SR 423 west (Macedonia-Rice Store Road) – McKenzie	Eastern terminus of SR 423
Henry				SR 114 south (Mansfield Road) – Hollow Rock, Bruceton	Northern terminus of SR 114
Henry	Paris			SR 218 (Highway 218 Bypass)	Beltway around Paris
Henry	Paris	84.86	136.57	US 641 (Memorial Drive/SR 69) – Downtown, Puryear, Camden	Eastern terminus; SR 77 ends as a secondary highway
1.000 mi = 1.609 km; 1.000 km = 0.621 mi: Concurrency terminus
