= Special routes of U.S. Route 79 =

Special routes of U.S. Route 79

Highway system
- United States Numbered Highway System; List; Special; Divided

A total of twelve special routes of U.S. Route 79 exist, divided between the states of Arkansas, Louisiana, Tennessee and Texas. Currently, they are all business routes, except for one bypass of Humboldt, Tennessee, and one bypass of Homer, Louisiana.

== Former Taylor business route ==
Business U.S. Highway 79-B
- Location: Taylor, Texas
- Length: 3.246 mi (5.224 km)
- Existed: 1990–2018

Business U.S. Highway 79-B began at the intersection of mainline US 79 and SH 95 in southern Taylor. The business route travelled northward along Main Street, concurrent with SH 95, and intersected FM 112. It then turned to the east along 4th Street to rejoin mainline US 79 at the city limits.

The business route through Taylor was originally designated on January 20, 1966 as Loop 427; on March 1, 1972, the western terminus extended north to Lake Drive. On October 6, 1972, the route had been designated to serve as a full loop around the city. What is now currently mainline US 79 in southern Taylor was originally part of the loop route, and the designations would be switched on January 20, 1977. In addition, the old route of US 79 was marked as Business US 79. On April 26, 1978, the section north of Taylor was cancelled. The section from SH 95 east and south to US 79 was cancelled, as it was never built, while the section from US 79 north and east to SH 95 was given the new designation of FM 397. The designation was changed from Loop 427 on June 21, 1990, and the western segment along 2nd St, 4th St, Main St, and Porter St was cancelled, and was replaced with the segment concurrent with SH 95 on April 25, 2002. On June 24, 2010, the section along Second Street from US 79 east to SH 95 was given to the city of Taylor, and Business US 79-B was rerouted south along SH 95 to US 79. Business US 79-B was cancelled on September 27, 2018. the section along Fourth Street was given to the city of Taylor, and the portion concurrent with SH 95 became SH 95 only.

== Henderson business route ==
Business U.S. Highway 79-F
- Location: Henderson, Texas
- Length: 2.583 mi (4.157 km)

Business U.S. Highway 79-F begins at US 79 in southeastern Henderson and travels northward along Jacksonville Drive and South Main Street. It turns eastward at its intersection with FM 13, briefly running concurrently with Bus. SH 64 along East Main Street. The route ends at US 79 / US 259 near Willow Lake; East Main Street continues past this intersection as FM 840.

Sections of roadway that are now Bus. US 79-F and Bus. SH 64-E were originally designated in 1944 as both Loop 153 and Loop 154. These designations were changed to the current business routes on June 21, 1990.

Loop 153 was designated on May 18, 1944 from SH 64 and SH 323 southeast to downtown Henderson and then east to US 79. On December 19, 1955, the section from US 79 & FM 840 to US 79 was removed from the state highway system. On June 21, 1990, Loop 153 was cancelled, as it was transferred to Bus. SH 64-E and Bus. US 79-F.

Loop 154 was designated on May 18, 1944 from SH 64 southward through Henderson to US 79. On June 21, 1990, Loop 154 was cancelled, as it was transferred to Bus. SH 64-E and Bus. US 79-F.

== Carthage business route ==
Business U.S. Highway 79-G
- Location: Carthage, Texas
- Length: 2.92 mi (4.70 km)

Business U.S. Highway 79-G travels through Carthage while mainline US 79 loops around the city to the north. The route begins at US 79 / SH 149 in eastern Carthage. The route travels eastward along Panola Street, passing Panola College and a junction with SH 315, before intersecting Bus. US 59 at a traffic circle. After leaving the traffic circle along Sabine Street, Bus. US 79-G continues eastward until it ends at a diamond interchange with US 79 / US 59.

Bus. US 79-G was designated in 1981 as Loop 334; it was the second route to bear that designation. The mileage was transferred to Bus. US 79-G in 1991.

== Homer bypass route ==
Bypass U.S. Highway 79
- Location: Homer, Louisiana

In Homer, the U.S. Highway 79 Bypass begins at an intersection with US 79 and LA 9 south of the town. The bypass runs west of the town and overlaps LA 2 for about the last 1 1/2 miles before ending at US 79 north of town.

Junction list

The entire highway is in Claiborne Parish.

Location	mi	km	Destinations	Notes
			US 79 / LA 9 – Minden, Homer, Arcadia, Junction City	Southern terminus
Homer			LA 3062 – Homer	
			LA 2 west – Shongaloo	South end of LA 2 overlap
Homer			US 79 / LA 2 east – Haynesville, Homer, Bernice	Northern terminus; north end of LA 2 overlap
1.000 mi = 1.609 km; 1.000 km = 0.621 mi: Concurrency terminus

== Magnolia business route ==
Jackson Street
- Location: Magnolia, Arkansas
- Length: 1.77 mi (2.85 km)
- Existed: c. 1967–present

U.S. Route 79 Business (US 79B and Hwy. 79B) is a 1.77-mile (2.85 km) business route of U.S. Route 79 in Columbia County, Arkansas.

Route description

The route's southern terminus is at US 79 at the southern city limits of Magnolia. The route runs north as Jackson Street through residential areas until meeting Highway 19. The route continues to head north towards downtown Magnolia where US 79B/AR 19 before terminating at US 82B (E Main Street). This junction also serves as the southern terminus of Highway 355.

Major intersections

The entire route is in Magnolia, Columbia County.

mi	km	Destinations	Notes
0.00	0.00	US 79	Southern terminus
1.02	1.64	AR 19 south (Legion Dr)	AR 19 northern terminus
1.77	2.85	US 82B (E Main St) / AR 355 north	Northern terminus, AR 355 southern terminus
1.000 mi = 1.609 km; 1.000 km = 0.621 mi

== Camden business route ==
U.S. Highway 79B
- Location: Camden, Arkansas
- Length: 5.41 mi (8.71 km)

== Bearden business route ==
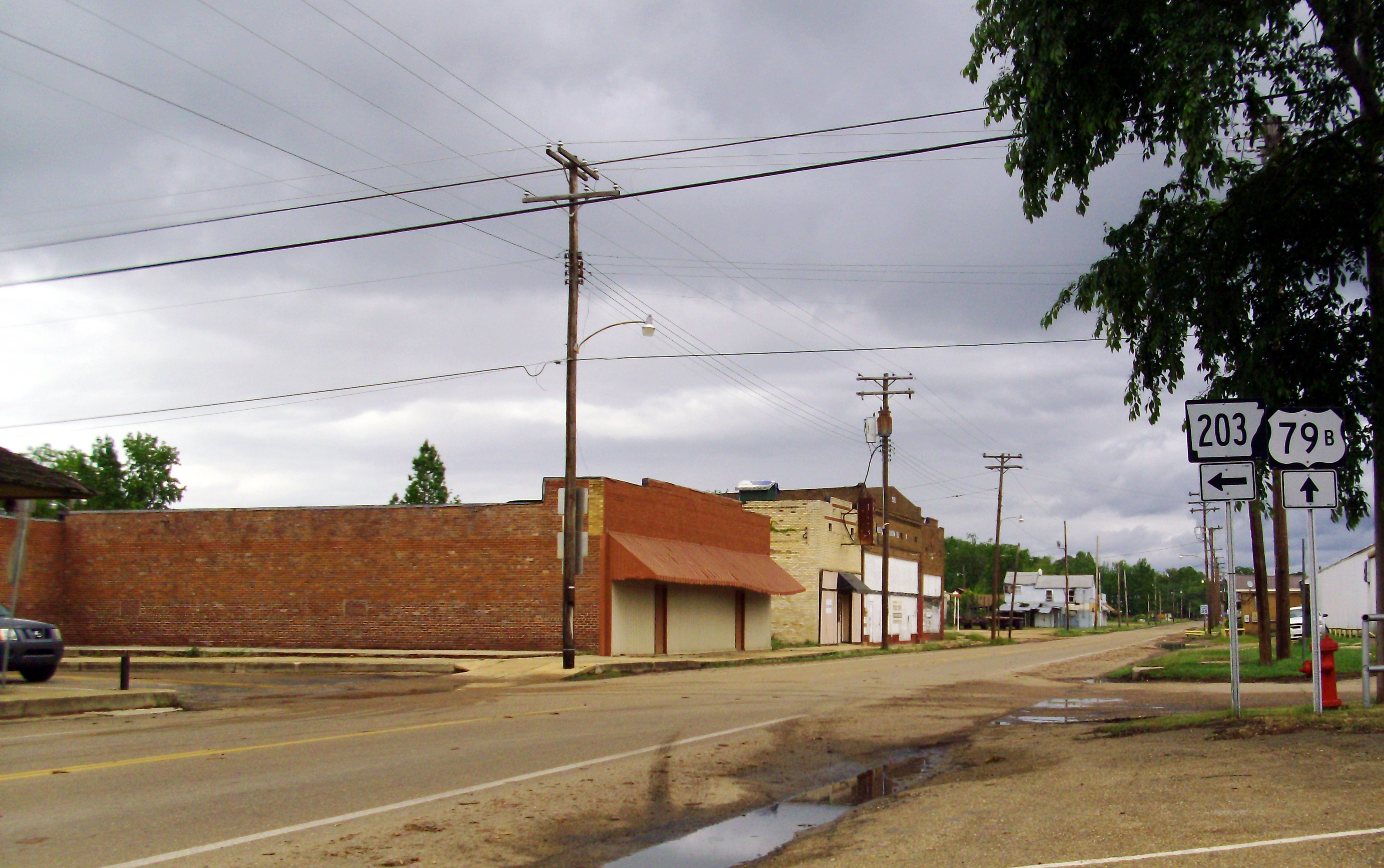
Highway 79B in downtown Bearden

1st Street
- Location: Bearden, Arkansas
- Length: 3.57 mi (5.75 km)

== Thornton business route ==
2nd Street
- Location: Thornton, Arkansas
- Length: 2.14 mi (3.44 km)

== Fordyce business route ==
U.S. Highway 79B
- Location: Fordyce, Arkansas
- Length: 3.30 mi (5.31 km)

== Pine Bluff/Altheimer business route ==
Blake Street/Martha Mitchell Expressway
- Location: Pine Bluff, Arkansas; Altheimer, Arkansas
- Length: 15.44 mi (24.85 km)

U.S. Route 79-B in Pine Bluff begins at I-530/US 65/US 79, southwest of Downtown. The highway runs east of the city center and north toward Altheimer. The highway meets its parent route before running through town and terminates north of town.

Junction list

The entire route is in Jefferson County.

Location	mi	km	Destinations	Notes
Pine Bluff			I-530 / US 65 / US 79 south – Little Rock, Dumas, Rison	Southern terminus
Pine Bluff			AR 190 (West 6th Avenue) – Cross Roads, Pine Bluff	
Pine Bluff			US 65B north (Martha Mitchell Expressway) / AR 365 north (Blake Street) – Little Rock, White Hall	South end of US 65B overlap
Pine Bluff			US 65B south (Martha Mitchell Expressway) – Dumas	North end of US 65B overlap
			AR 31 north – Lonoke	
Altheimer			AR 15 north – England	
Altheimer			US 63 / US 79 – Stuttgart, Pine Bluff	
Altheimer			AR 88 east – Gillett	
			US 63 / US 79 – Pine Bluff, Stuttgart	Northern terminus
1.000 mi = 1.609 km; 1.000 km = 0.621 mi: Concurrency terminus

== Stuttgart business route ==
22nd Street
- Location: Stuttgart, Arkansas
- Length: 2.10 mi (3.38 km)

== Clarendon business route ==
U.S. Highway 79B
- Location: Clarendon, Arkansas
- Length: 1.00 mi (1.61 km)

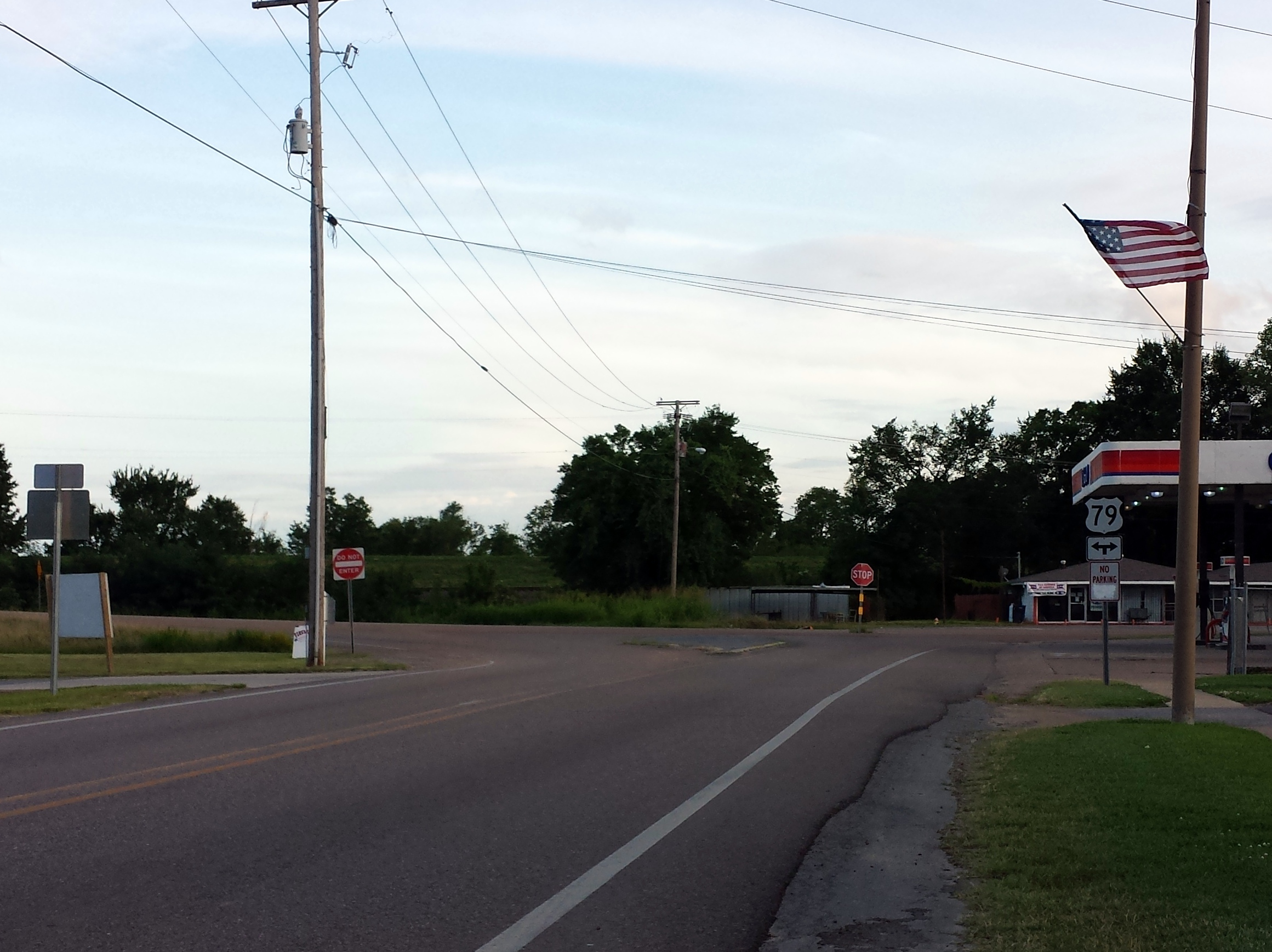
US 79B terminates at its parent route in Clarendon

== Former McNeil city route ==
U.S. Highway 79C
- Location: McNeil, Arkansas
- Length: 0.94 mi (1,510 m)
- Existed: May 27, 1970

US Highway 79C was a city route in McNeil, Arkansas. The route was redesignated as Highway 98B in 1970.

== Humboldt bypass route ==
U.S. Route 79 Bypass
- Location: Humboldt, Tennessee
- Length: 3.9 mi (6.3 km)

U.S. Route 79 Bypass (also known as US 79 Bypass or US 79 Byp.) is a bypass route of U.S. Route 79 in Humboldt, Tennessee. It is concurrent with US 70A Bypass and unsigned State Route 366 (SR 366) for its entire length.

The highway begins as a two-lane highway at an interchange with US 70A/US 79 (W Main Street/SR 76 at the southwestern edge of town. It heads north through some industrial areas, where it has an intersection with SR 152. The highway then curves to the east through more industrial areas to cross a railroad overpass and enter a business district and come to an intersection with US 45W and US 45W Business (N Central Avenue/SR 5), where it widens to a four-lane highway and US 45W joins the highway. They then pass through some neighborhoods, where they cross over another railroad overpass, before US 70A Bypass/US 79 Bypass come to an end at an intersection with US 70A/US 79 (Eastend Drive/SR 76), with the Humboldt Bypass, and unsigned SR 366, continuing south along US 45W.

The entire route is in Humboldt, Gibson County.

mi	km	Destinations	Notes
0.0	0.0	US 70A / US 79 (W Main Street/SR 76) – McKenzie, Gadsden, Downtown	Interchange; southern terminus; western terminus of US 70A Bypass/SR 366; southern end of US 70A Bypass/SR 366 concurrency
1.1	1.8	SR 152 (McLin Street) – Maury City, Downtown	
2.8	4.5	US 45W north / US 45W Bus. south (N Central Avenue/SR 5) – Trenton, Downtown	Southern end of wrong-way US 45W concurrency; northern terminus of US 45W Business
3.9	6.3	US 70A / US 79 (Eastend Drive/SR 76) – Downtown, Gibson, Milan US 45W south (SR 366 east) – Three Way, Jackson	Eastern terminus of US 70A Bypass; northern terminus of US 79 Bypass
1.000 mi = 1.609 km; 1.000 km = 0.621 mi: Concurrency terminus
