= Tennessee State Route 374 =

State highway in Tennessee, United States

State Route 374
- SR 374 highlighted in red

Route information
- Maintained by TDOT
- Length: 16.20 mi (26.07 km)
- Existed: July 1, 1983–present

Major junctions
- West end: US 79 near Woodlawn
- US 41A in Clarksville; SR 48 in Needmore; US 79 in St. Bethlehem; SR 237 in Clarksville
- East end: US 41A in Clarksville

Location
- Country: United States
- State: Tennessee
- Counties: Montgomery

Highway system
- Tennessee State Routes; Interstate; US; State
← SR 373	→ SR 375

State Route 374 (SR 374) is an east west state highway in Montgomery County, Tennessee, that acts as a cross-town arterial road. The route serves as a northern bypass around downtown Clarksville, and also provides access to Fort Campbell, a United States Army installation that is the headquarters for the 101st Airborne Division and the 160th Special Operations Aviation Regiment (Airborne). It currently runs from U.S. Route 79 (US 79) to US 41 Alternate (US 41A). The route is planned to be extended southward to SR 149 from its western terminus, replacing a short section of that route to SR 13.

== Route description ==
The entirety of SR 374 is a primary state highway that serves as a northern bypass around central Clarksville, the fifth-largest city in Tennessee, in Montgomery County. The part of the route between US 79 northeast and west of the central business district is part of the National Highway System (NHS), a national network of roads identified as important to the national economy, defense, and mobility. This corridor provides seamless connection between two NHS corridors on US 79. The road serves as both a bypass and a major thoroughfare, providing access to Fort Campbell and residential and commercial areas in the northern part of the city.

SR 374 begins at a trumpet interchange with US 79 (Dover Road) in western Clarksville near the southeastern part of Fort Campbell as a four-lane divided limited-access highway. This interchange is graded to allow future extension to the south. The route runs through a rapidly-developing area initially in a north-south alignment, before shifting eastward. The road then turns north an has its first intersection, which is signalized, with Lafayette Road, before gradually turning eastward through a residential area and intersecting Garrettsburg Road at another signalized intersection. Passing through additional neighborhoods, SR 374 had additional at-grade intersections, including a signalized one with Jordan Road, before reaching an interchange with US 41A (Fort Campbell Boulevard). A short distance later, the highway has a major intersection with Peachers Mill Road and passes under a pedestrian bridge. The road then passes by Kenwood High School and through a wooded area where it crosses the Red River. It then has a signalized intersection with Whitfield Road, and passes through additional residential and commercial areas. The road then has a signalized intersection with SR 48 (Trenton Road), and then briefly shifts southward, before resuming its eastward trajectory and reaching a single point urban interchange (SPUI) with US 79 (Wilma Rudolph Boulevard) and crossing a railroad immediately beyond. A short distance beyond, the road curves southward, where it intersects Ted Crozier Sr. Boulevard, and enters another residential area. The next major intersection is with the western terminus of SR 237 (Rossview Road) before Dunbar Cave Road, which provides access to Dunbar Cave State Park to the west. The road then reduces to two lanes with a center two-way left turn lane. Turning southeast, the road enters a bend in the Red River, where the turn lane ends, and crosses the river a second time a short distance later. The road then begins a gradual ascent out of the river gorge, gaining an eastbound truck climbing lane, before intersecting Memorial Drive, where the truck lane ends. Here, the road shifts into a north-south alignment and regains a center turn lane, before reaching its eastern terminus about 3/4 mile (1.2 km) later at a signalized intersection with US 41A (Madison Street) in southeastern Clarksville just past Richland Middle School and Clarksville High School.

=== Names and honorary designations ===
SR 374 bears multiple names and honorary designations. The highway is designated "Paul B. Huff Memorial Parkway" after Paul B. Huff, a Medal of Honor U.S. Army recipient who lived in Clarksville. From Lafayette Road to US 41A, it is known as "Purple Heart Parkway". From here to US 79 it is called 101st Airborne Division Parkway after the 101st Airborne Division that is stationed at Fort Campbell. Extending to Memorial Drive, it is called "Warfield Boulevard" The road is called "Richview Road" from Memorial Drive to its eastern terminus.

== History ==
On September 3, 1970, construction began on a new road between US 41A and Dunbar Cave in what is now eastern Clarksville to provide access to the cave. At this time, the land that the cave was on was private land, but planned to become a state park. This road was completed in October 1971. On July 1, 1983, TDOT assumed control of this road and designated it SR 374 as part of a larger statewide takeover of locally-maintained roads and renumbering of existing state routes. As Clarksville grew in the later 20th century, the need for a bypass around the central city became apparent, and plans began to materialize by the late 1970s. The road was initially known as North Parkway in its early history. The contract for the first phase, the short section between SR 48 and US 79 (Wilma Rudolph Boulevard; then Guthrie Road) was awarded on December 19, 1988, and work was completed in the summer of 1990. A contract for the short section between US 41A (Fort Campbell Boulevard) and Peachers Mill Road was awarded in January 1990, and a contract to build the US 41A interchange was awarded two months later. The section opened to traffic on January 31, 1992. The 4.1-mile (6.6 km) section between Peachers Mill Road and SR 48 began construction in the fall of 1990, and opened on October 29, 1992. The five-mile (8.0 km) section between US 79 (Dover Road) and US 41A began construction by early September 1997, and opened on August 15, 2000. Since before SR 374 was built, its western terminus has planned to be extended south across Lake Barkley to SR 149 and eventually form a complete beltway.

== Major intersections ==
Milepoints listed in this table is an estimate of the distance between the western terminus and the junction in question. The entire route is in Montgomery County.

Location	mi	km	Destinations	Notes
	0.0	0.0	US 79 (Dover Road/SR 76) – Dover, Clarksville	Western terminus; interchange
Clarksville	4.8	7.7	US 41A (Fort Campbell Boulevard/SR 12) – Clarksville, Oak Grove, Hopkinsville	Interchange
Clarksville	6.0	9.7	Peachers Mill Road	At-grade intersection
Clarksville	10.3	16.6	SR 48 (Trenton Road) to I-24	At-grade intersection
Clarksville	11.1	17.9	US 79 (Wilma Rudolph Boulevard/SR 13) to I-24	Single-point urban interchange
Clarksville	12.1	19.5	Ted A. Crozier Boulevard	At-grade intersection
Clarksville	12.7	20.4	SR 237 east (Rossview Road) – Port Royal State Park	At-grade intersection
Clarksville	13.6	21.9	Dunbar Cave Road -- Dunbar Cave State Park	At-grade intersection
Clarksville	16.2	26.1	US 41A (Madison Street/SR 76/SR 112) – Nashville	Eastern terminus
1.000 mi = 1.609 km; 1.000 km = 0.621 mi
