= Tennessee State Route 187 =

State highway in Gibson County, Tennessee

State Route 187
- SR 187 highlighted in red

Route information
- Maintained by TDOT
- Length: 7.8 mi (12.6 km)
- Existed: July 1, 1983–present

Major junctions
- West end: US 70A / US 79 near Humboldt
- SR 186 near Gibson
- East end: US 45E in Milan

Location
- Country: United States
- State: Tennessee
- Counties: Gibson

Highway system
- Tennessee State Routes; Interstate; US; State
← SR 186	→ SR 188

State Route 187 (SR 187) is a 7.8-mile-long (12.6 km) east–west state highway in Gibson County, Tennessee.

== Route description ==
SR 187 begins just outside the Humboldt city limits at an intersection with US 70A/US 79/SR 76. It goes east through rural farmland to have a short concurrency with SR 186 just south of the town of Gibson. It continues east, then northeast, through farmland and rural areas to enter the Milan city limits, where it passes through some industrial areas before SR 187 comes to an end at an intersection with US 45E/SR 43 just south of downtown. The entire route of SR 187 is a two-lane highway.

== Major intersections ==
The entire route is in Gibson County.

Location	mi	km	Destinations	Notes
	0.0	0.0	US 70A / US 79 (Humboldt Highway/SR 76) – Humboldt, Gibson, Milan	Western terminus
	1.4	2.3	SR 186 north – Gibson	Western end of SR 186 concurrency
	1.7	2.7	SR 186 south – Three Way	Eastern end of SR 186 concurrency
Milan	7.8	12.6	US 45E (S 1st Street/SR 43) – Bradford, Downtown, Medina	Eastern terminus
1.000 mi = 1.609 km; 1.000 km = 0.621 mi: Concurrency terminus
