= Tennessee State Route 424 =

State highway in Tennessee, United States

State Route 424
- TN 424 highlighted in red

Route information
- Maintained by TDOT
- Length: 17.3 mi (27.8 km)

Major junctions
- West end: US 70 near Cedar Grove
- SR 22 in Clarksburg
- East end: SR 114 in Yuma

Location
- Country: United States
- State: Tennessee
- Counties: Carroll

Highway system
- Tennessee State Routes; Interstate; US; State
← SR 423	→ SR 425

State Route 424 (SR 424) is a 17.3-mile-long (27.8 km) east-west state highway in southern Carroll County, Tennessee. It connects the communities of Cedar Grove and Yuma with the town of Clarksburg.

== Route description ==
SR 424 begins just north of Cedar Grove at an intersection with US 70 (SR 1). It winds its way east through wooded and slightly hilly terrain for several miles, where it crosses over the Rutherford Fork of the Obion River, before turning northeast farmland and entering Clarksburg. The highway has a short concurrency with SR 22 through the town's main business district before leaving Clarksburg and continuing southeast through farmland. SR 424 briefly passes through a wooded area, where it crosses over the Big Sandy River, before it passes through Yuma and turns northeast, just shortly before it comes to an end at an intersection with SR 114. The entire route of SR 424 is a two-lane highway.

== Major intersections ==
The entire route is in Carroll County.

Location	mi	km	Destinations	Notes
	0.0	0.0	US 70 (SR 1) – Jackson, Huntingdon	Western terminus
			Bridge over the Rutherford Fork of the Obion River	
Clarksburg			SR 22 north (Lexington Clarksburg Highway) – Huntingdon	Western end of SR 22 concurrency
Clarksburg			SR 22 south (Lexington Clarksburg Highway) – Lexington	Eastern end of SR 22 concurrency
			Bridge over the Big Sandy River	
Yuma	17.3	27.8	SR 114 (Yuma-Westport Road/Hester-Cavia Road) – Hollow Rock, Bruceton, Natchez Trace State Park	Eastern terminus
1.000 mi = 1.609 km; 1.000 km = 0.621 mi: Concurrency terminus
