= Tennessee State Route 120 =

State highway in Tennessee, United States

State Route 120
- Bumpus Mills Road
- SR 120 highlighted in red

Route information
- Maintained by TDOT
- Length: 12.09 mi (19.46 km)

Major junctions
- South end: US 79 near Big Rock
- North end: KY 139 at the Kentucky state line near Bumpus Mills

Location
- Country: United States
- State: Tennessee
- Counties: Stewart

Highway system
- Tennessee State Routes; Interstate; US; State
← SR 119	→ SR 121

State Route 120 (SR 120) is a north–south secondary state highway located entirely in Stewart County in northwestern Middle Tennessee.

== Route description ==
SR 120 starts at a junction with US 79/SR 76 near Big Rock. The highway goes north for a short distance before turning west to pass along the north side of Big Rock. SR 120 then winds its way southwest before turning north again to pass through Bumpus Mills before coming to an end at the Kentucky state line, where it continues as Kentucky Route 139 (KY 139) upon entry into Trigg County, Kentucky.

== Major intersections ==
The entire route is in Stewart County.

Location	mi	km	Destinations	Notes
Big Rock	0.0	0.0	US 79 (SR 76) – Dover, Clarksville	Southern terminus
	12.09	19.46	KY 139 north (S Road) – Cadiz	Kentucky state line; northern terminus
1.000 mi = 1.609 km; 1.000 km = 0.621 mi
