= Tennessee State Route 425 =

State highway in Tennessee, United States

State Route 425
- Middle Road
- TN 425 highlighted in red

Route information
- Maintained by TDOT
- Length: 2.14 mi (3.44 km)

Major junctions
- West end: US 45E in Milan
- East end: US 70A / US 79 in Milan

Location
- Country: United States
- State: Tennessee
- Counties: Gibson

Highway system
- Tennessee State Routes; Interstate; US; State
| ← SR 424 | → SR 429 |

State Route 425 (SR 425), also known as Middle Road, is a short 2.14-mile-long (3.44 km) east-west state highway located entirely in the city of Milan, Tennessee.

== Route description ==
SR 425 begins on the northern edge of town at an intersection with US 45E (N 1st Street/SR 43), directly beside Milan Elementary School. It goes east through neighborhoods, where it passes by Milan Middle School, before turning southeast through more rural areas to cross over some railroad tracks and a creek before coming to an end at an intersection with US 70A/US 79 (E Vanhook Street/SR 76/SR 77). The entire route of SR 425 is a two-lane highway and acts as a northeastern bypass of the city.

== Major intersections ==
The entire route is in Milan, Gibson County.

| mi | km | Destinations | Notes |
|---|---|---|---|
| 0.00 | 0.00 | US 45E (N 1st Street/SR 43) – Bradford, Downtown, Medina | Western terminus |
| 2.14 | 3.44 | US 70A / US 79 (E Vanhook Street/SR 76/SR 77) – Atwood, Downtown, Gibson | Eastern terminus |
1.000 mi = 1.609 km; 1.000 km = 0.621 mi
