= Tennessee State Route 218 =

State highway in Tennessee, United States

State Route 218
- Paris Bypass
- SR 218 highlighted in red

Route information
- Maintained by TDOT
- Existed: July 1, 1983–present

Major junctions
- South end: US 641 north of Paris
- SR 69 northwest of Paris; US 79 west of Paris; US 641 in Paris; US 79 east of Paris
- North end: SR 140 in Buchanan

Location
- Country: United States
- State: Tennessee
- Counties: Henry

Highway system
- Tennessee State Routes; Interstate; US; State
| ← SR 217 | → SR 219 |

State Route 218 (SR 218) is a state highway and bypass around the city of Paris, in the western portion of the U.S. state of Tennessee.

The first section of the route opened in 2010 and finished in 2013.

== Route description ==
It begins at an intersection with US 641 north of Paris. The route then travels west to an intersection with SR 69 northwest of Paris. The route travels to the south to intersect SR 54 on the west side of Paris. Just past this intersection, the highway turns to the southeast, and then intersects US 79 and turns east and travels just south of Paris city limits. It then enters the city limits of Paris and intersects US 641/SR 69. Then, the route begins to gradually turn north. The route comes to an intersection at US 79 on the east side of Paris and turns northeast along US 79 to an intersection where SR 218 turns north and becomes a curvy rural road and comes to an at SR 140 in Buchanan.

== Junction list ==
The entire route is in Henry County.

| Location | mi | km | Destinations | Notes |
|---|---|---|---|---|
| North of Paris | 0.0 | 0.0 | US 641 (SR 54) – Puryear, Paris | Southern terminus |
| North of Paris | 2.6 | 4.2 | SR 69 – Paris, Airport, Mayfield | |
| | 5.6 | 9.0 | SR 54 (West Wood Street) – Dresden, Paris | |
| | 8.8 | 14.2 | US 79 (Austin Peay Highway/SR 76) – Paris, Henry, McKenzie | |
| Paris | 11 | 18 | SR 77 – Paris, Huntingdon | |
| Paris | 11.9 | 19.2 | US 641 (SR 69) – Paris, Camden | |
| | 13.3 | 21.4 | SR 69A – Paris, Big Sandy | |
| Paris | 16.2 | 26.1 | US 79 south (East Wood Street/SR 76) – Paris | Southern end of US 79 concurrency |
| | 19.2 | 30.9 | US 79 north (SR 76) – Dover, Paris Landing, Land Between the Lakes | Northern end of US 79 concurrency |
| Buchanan | 26 | 42 | SR 140 – Puryear, Paris Landing State Park | Northern terminus |
1.000 mi = 1.609 km; 1.000 km = 0.621 mi

== See also ==
- List of state routes in Tennessee
