= Tennessee State Route 219 =

Road in Tennessee

State Route 219
- Rosser Road
- SR 219 highlighted in red

Route information
- Maintained by TDOT
- Length: 4.0 mi (6.4 km)
- Existed: July 1, 1983–present

Major junctions
- South end: US 70 near Huntingdon
- North end: SR 77 near Huntingdon

Location
- Country: United States
- State: Tennessee
- Counties: Carroll

Highway system
- Tennessee State Routes; Interstate; US; State
| ← SR 218 | → SR 220 |

State Route 219 (SR 219), also known as Rosser Road, is a 4.0-mile-long (6.4 km) north-south state highway in Carroll County, Tennessee, connecting US 70 with SR 77, just northeast of Huntingdon.

== Route description ==
SR 219 begins at an intersection with US 70/SR 1 just east of Huntingdon. It goes north to pass through farmland and rural areas before passing through a wooded area, where it crosses a bridge over a large creek. It then reenters farmland shortly before coming to an end at a Y-Intersection with SR 77. The entire route of SR 219 is a rural two-lane highway.

== Major intersections ==
The entire route is in Carroll County.

| Location | mi | km | Destinations | Notes |
|---|---|---|---|---|
| | 0.0 | 0.0 | US 70 (SR 1) – Huntingdon, Hollow Rock, Bruceton | Southern terminus |
| | 4.0 | 6.4 | SR 77 (Gordon Browning Highway) – Huntingdon, Paris | Northern terminus |
1.000 mi = 1.609 km; 1.000 km = 0.621 mi
