= Tennessee State Route 369 =

Highway in Tennessee

State Route 369
- N Washington Avenue
- TN 369 highlighted in red

Route information
- Maintained by TDOT
- Length: 1.11 mi (1.79 km)
- Existed: July 1, 1983–present

Major junctions
- West end: SR 54 in Brownsville
- East end: US 70A / US 79 in Brownsville

Location
- Country: United States
- State: Tennessee
- Counties: Haywood

Highway system
- Tennessee State Routes; Interstate; US; State
← SR 368	→ SR 370

State Route 369 (SR 369), also known as N Washington Avenue, is a short 1.11-mile-long (1.79 km) east-west state highway located entirely in the city of Brownsville, Tennessee.

== Route description ==
SR 369 begins just north of downtown at an intersection with SR 54 (N Washington Avenue/Thornton Road). It goes east past various businesses, neighborhoods, and then doctor's offices and pharmacies, where it passes by the Haywood Park Community Hospital. The highway then comes to an end shortly thereafter at an intersection with US 70A/US 79/SR 76 (Dupree Street/N Washington Avenue). The entire route of SR 369 is a two-lane highway.

== History ==
The entire route of SR 369 follows part of the former route of US 70A/US 79 through downtown.

== Major intersections ==
The entire route is in Brownsville, Haywood County.

mi	km	Destinations	Notes
0.00	0.00	SR 54 (N Washington Avenue/Thornton Road) – Covington, Downtown, Alamo	Western terminus
1.11	1.79	US 70A / US 79 (Dupree Street/N Washington Avenue/SR 76) to I-40 – Stanton, Somerville, Bells	Eastern terminus
1.000 mi = 1.609 km; 1.000 km = 0.621 mi
