= Tennessee State Route 437 =

State highway in Tennessee, United States

State Route 437
- Shelbyville Bypass
- TN 437 highlighted in red

Route information
- Maintained by TDOT
- Length: 6.4 mi (10.3 km)

Major junctions
- West end: US 231 in Shelbyville
- SR 64 east of Shelbyville
- East end: US 41A east of Shelbyville

Location
- Country: United States
- State: Tennessee
- Counties: Bedford

Highway system
- Tennessee State Routes; Interstate; US; State
| ← SR 436 | → SR 438 |

State Route 437 (SR 437, or Shelbyville Bypass) is a 6.4-mile-long (10.3 km) state highway in Bedford County in the central part of the U.S. state of Tennessee. The route is a bypass of Shelbyville, around the northern and eastern parts of the city.

== Route description ==
SR 437 begins at an interchange with US 231/SR 10/SR 82 (Florida Short Route) in the northern part of Shelbyville. It travels to the east-southeast and then curves to the south and has an intersection with SR 64 east of Shelbyville and meets its eastern terminus, an intersection with US 41A/SR 16 east of town. The entire route is a 2-lane highway.

== History ==
The Shelbyville Bypass cost $14.8 million and was funded by the American Recovery and Reinvestment Act in July 2009. In 2011, it was reported that the highway was opened to traffic.

Extending SR 437 has been discussed, but as of March 2024, the project has stagnated. The delay could stem from issues such as the lack of State funding, the increased cost of road maintenance on local government, and zoning issues along the proposed path of the project.

== Major intersections ==
The entire route is in Bedford County.

| Location | mi | km | Destinations | Notes |
|---|---|---|---|---|
| Shelbyville | 0.0 | 0.0 | US 231 (SR 10 / SR 82) – Fayetteville, Shelbyville, Murfreesboro | Western terminus; interchange |
| | 6.0 | 9.7 | SR 64 (Wartrace Pike) – Lewisburg, Shelbyville, Wartrace | |
| | 6.4 | 10.3 | US 41A (SR 16) – Tullahoma, Shelbyville, Unionville | Eastern terminus |
1.000 mi = 1.609 km; 1.000 km = 0.621 mi

== See also ==
- List of state routes in Tennessee
