= Tennessee State Route 119 =

State highway in Tennessee, United States

State Route 119
- SR 119 highlighted in red

Route information
- Maintained by TDOT
- Length: 4.7 mi (7.6 km)

Major junctions
- South end: US 79 at Paris Landing State Park east of Buchanan
- North end: KY 121 at the Kentucky state line northeast of Buchanan

Location
- Country: United States
- State: Tennessee
- Counties: Henry

Highway system
- Tennessee State Routes; Interstate; US; State
← SR 118	→ SR 120

State Route 119 (SR 119) is a 4.7-mile-long (7.6 km) south-to-north state highway located entirely in Henry County, Tennessee. The road begins at the Paris Landing State Park, at an intersection with US 79/SR 76. It ends at the Kentucky state line, northeast of Buchanan. There, the roadway continues as Kentucky Route 121. The current length is 4.7 mi (7.6 km).

== Route description ==
SR 119 begins on the banks of Kentucky Lake/Tennessee River at an intersection with US 79/SR 76 at Paris Landing State Park. It travels northward, closely paralleling the Kentucky Lake/Tennessee River as it passes by several lake-related businesses before passing through wooded areas until it becomes KY 121 at the Kentucky state line.

== Major intersections ==
The entire route is in Henry County.

Location	mi	km	Destinations	Notes
Paris Landing State Park	0.0	0.0	US 79 (Austin Peay Memorial Highway/SR 76) – Paris, Dover	Southern terminus; provides access to Land Between the Lakes National Recreation Area
	4.7	7.6	KY 121 north – Murray	Kentucky state line; northern terminus
1.000 mi = 1.609 km; 1.000 km = 0.621 mi

== See also ==
- List of state routes in Tennessee
