= Tennessee State Route 221 =

State highway in Tennessee, United States

State Route 221
- Alamo Gadsden Road
- SR 221 highlighted in red

Route information
- Maintained by TDOT
- Length: 7.4 mi (11.9 km)
- Existed: July 1, 1983–present

Major junctions
- West end: SR 54 / SR 88 in Alamo
- East end: US 70A / US 79 in Gadsden

Location
- Country: United States
- State: Tennessee

Highway system
- Tennessee State Routes; Interstate; US; State
← SR 220	→ SR 222

State Route 221 (SR 221) is a 7.4 miles (11.9 km) east-west state highway in Crockett County, Tennessee, connecting the towns of Alamo and Gadsden. For the majority of its length, SR 221 is known as Alamo Gadsden Road.

== Route description ==
SR 221 begins in downtown Alamo at an intersection with SR 54 and SR 88. It goes east through neighborhoods as E Church Street before leaving Alamo and passing through farmland and rural areas as Alamo Gadsden Road. It goes due east for several miles, where it crosses over a large creek, before turning southeast at a Y-Intersection with Emerson Road to enter Gadsden. The highway enters town along Quincy Street and passes by some homes before coming to an end at an intersection with US 70A/US 79/SR 76. The entire route of SR 221 is a two-lane highway.

== Major intersections ==
The entire route is in Crockett County.

Location	mi	km	Destinations	Notes
Alamo	0.0	0.0	SR 54 east (N Bells Street) – Trenton SR 54 west / SR 88 west (W Church Street) to US 412 – Maury City, Brownsville SR 88 east (N Bells Street) – Bells	Western terminus
Gadsden	7.4	11.9	US 70A / US 79 (SR 76) – Bells, Humboldt	Eastern terminus
1.000 mi = 1.609 km; 1.000 km = 0.621 mi
