= Tennessee State Route 367 =

State highway in Tennessee, United States

State Route 367
- College Street
- TN 367 highlighted in red

Route information
- Maintained by TDOT
- Length: 4.80 mi (7.72 km)
- Existed: July 1, 1983–present

Major junctions
- South end: US 45W / SR 457 in Trenton
- SR 54 in Trenton; SR 104 in Trenton
- North end: US 45W in Trenton

Location
- Country: United States
- State: Tennessee
- Counties: Gibson

Highway system
- Tennessee State Routes; Interstate; US; State
← SR 366	→ SR 368

State Route 367 (SR 367), also known as College Street, is a short 4.80-mile-long (7.72 km) north-south state highway located entirely in the city of Trenton, Tennessee.

== Route description ==
SR 367 begins at an intersection with US 45W/SR 5 (Highway 45 Bypass S/College Street) and SR 457. It heads north through neighborhoods for a couple of miles, where it has an intersection with SR 54 (Armory Street), before entering downtown and coming to an intersection with SR 104 (Eaton Street). The highway then winds around the Gibson County Courthouse traffic circle before continuing north to leave downtown and cross the North Fork of the Forked Deer River. SR 367 has a Y-intersection with Halliburton Street (former SR 54) before turning northwest through more rural areas before coming to an end at an intersection with US 45W/SR 5/SR 77. The entire route of SR 367 is a two-lane highway.

== History ==
The entire route of SR 367 follows the former route of US 45W/SR 5 through downtown Trenton. At one point, it was also designated and signed as U.S. Route 45W Business (US 45W Business), with SR 367 being that highway's unsigned companion route. That highway has since been decommissioned with the road being resigned solely as SR 367.

== Major intersections ==
The entire route is in Trenton, Gibson County.

mi	km	Destinations	Notes
0.0	0.0	US 45W (S College Street/Highway 45 Bypass S/SR 5) – Humboldt, Dyer SR 457 west (Trenton Bypass) – Dyersburg	Southern terminus; eastern terminus of SR 457
1.8	2.9	SR 54 (Armory Street) – Alamo, Bradford	
2.9	4.7	SR 104 (Eaton Street) – Dyersburg, Eaton, Milan	
3.5	5.6	Bridge over the North Fork of the Forked Deer River	
4.8	7.7	US 45W (SR 5/SR 77) – Dyer, Humboldt	Northern terminus; road continues north as N College Street
1.000 mi = 1.609 km; 1.000 km = 0.621 mi
