= Tennessee State Route 256 =

State highway in Tennessee, United States

State Route 256
- SR 256 highlighted in red

Route information
- Maintained by TDOT
- Length: 10.6 mi (17.1 km)
- Existed: July 1, 1983–present

Major junctions
- South end: US 41A along the Cheatham-Robertson County line
- I-24 Exit 19 in Robertson County
- North end: SR 76 in Adams

Location
- Country: United States
- State: Tennessee
- Counties: Cheatham, Robertson

Highway system
- Tennessee State Routes; Interstate; US; State
← SR 255	→ SR 257

State Route 256 (SR 256) is a north–south secondary state highway located in northern Middle Tennessee. Except for its southern terminus on US 41A, the route is located almost entirely In western Robertson County.

== Route description ==
SR 256's southern terminus is at a junction with US 41A (SR 112) northwest of Pleasant View, which really constitutes Cheatham County’s northern boundary with Robertson County in that area. SR 256 crosses the I-24 corridor at that route's Exit 19 interchange. The secondary route ends in Adams, at a junction with SR 76.

== Major intersections ==
County	Location	mi	km	Destinations	Notes
Cheatham–Robertson county line		0.0	0.0	US 41A (SR 112) – Nashville, Pleasant View, Clarksville	Southern terminus
Robertson				I-24 – Clarksville, Nashville	I-24 Exit 19
Robertson	Adams	10.6	17.1	SR 76 (S Church Street) – Clarksville, Adams	Eastern terminus
1.000 mi = 1.609 km; 1.000 km = 0.621 mi
