= Sango, Tennessee =

Sango
- Unincorporated community
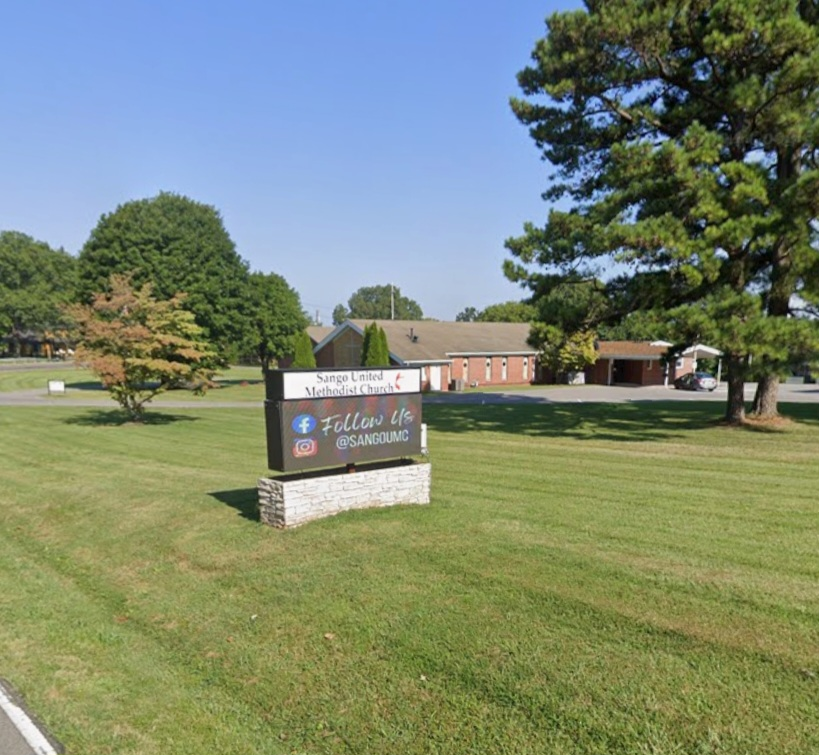
- Sango United Methodist Church

- Location within the state of Tennessee
- Coordinates: 36°30′20″N 87°13′15″W
- Country: United States
- State: Tennessee
- County: Montgomery
- Elevation: 643 ft (196 m)
- Time zone: UTC-6 (Central (CST))
  - Summer (DST): UTC-5 (CDT)
- GNIS feature ID: 1300782

Sango is an unincorporated community in the southeastern corner of Montgomery County, Tennessee, about five miles (8.0 km) east of Clarksville. It is located near Interstate 24, 30 minutes northwest of Nashville.

Once primarily a rural community consisting largely of prime farmland, many new housing developments have gone up in the past few years, and it has become very suburban.

As Sango is neither an incorporated community nor a census-designated place, it has no clearly defined boundaries. It roughly covers an area stretching from U.S. Route 41A to just beyond Interstate 24. Sango is considered to have a higher standard of living when compared to other similarly sized towns in middle Tennessee.

== History ==
From before the Civil War to at least 1990, tobacco was the main cash crop in Sango. Besides burley and some flue-cured tobaccos, high-quality dark-fired (wood smoke-cured) tobacco was grown in Sango, as well as throughout Montgomery County. During the tobacco wars of 1904 to 1908 (between the farmers and the Duke tobacco monopoly), a key battle between the "Night Riders" (farmers) and agents of the tobacco monopoly took place at the intersection of Bagwell and Sango Roads, in eastern Sango.
