= Woodlawn, Tennessee =

Unincorporated community in Tennessee, US

Coordinates: 36.542°N 87.515°W

Woodlawn is an unincorporated community in Montgomery County, Tennessee.

== Geography ==
Woodlawn is located along U.S. Route 79 west of neighboring Clarksville. It is part of the Clarksville, TN–KY Metropolitan Statistical Area.

== Post office ==
The community has a post office with the ZIP code of 37191.

== Education ==
An elementary school in the community is operated by the Clarksville-Montgomery County School System.
