= Cedar Grove, Carroll County, Tennessee =

Cedar Grove, Tennessee
- Unincorporated community
- Location within Tennessee Location within the United States
- Coordinates: 35°49′01″N 88°35′44″W
- Country: United States
- State: Tennessee
- County: Carroll
- Elevation: 492 ft (150 m)
- Time zone: UTC-6 (Central (CST))
  - Summer (DST): UTC-5 (CDT)
- ZIP code: 38321
- Area code: 731
- GNIS feature ID: 1305763

Cedar Grove is an unincorporated community in Carroll County, Tennessee, United States. The zipcode is: 38321.
