= South Fork of the Forked Deer River =

South Fork of Forked Deer River

Location
- Country: United States
- State: Tennessee

Physical characteristics
- Source: Confluence of Huggins Creek and Tar Creek in Chester County
  - coordinates: 35°23′58″N 88°36′13″W
- Mouth: Forked Deer River in Dyer County
  - coordinates: 35°59′49″N 89°26′5″W

The South Fork of the Forked Deer River is formed at the confluence of Huggins Creek and Tar Creek in the southern part of Chester County, Tennessee, United States. It flows in a generally northern direction and passes just to the east of Henderson. It then runs in a northwesterly direction and enters Madison County and passes near Pinson. Flowing still generally north it passes through Jackson. It continues across Madison County and enters Crockett County, It flows in a northwest direction through the following counties sometimes passing in and out of a county several times. Haywood County, Lauderdale County and Dyer County where it joins with the North Fork. The Forked Deer then empties into the Obion River which in turn flows into the Mississippi River.

== See also ==
- List of rivers of Tennessee
