= Fruitvale, Tennessee =

- Unincorporated community
- Location within Tennessee
- Coordinates: 35°44′48″N 89°01′50″W
- Country: United States
- State: Tennessee
- County: Crockett
- Elevation: 358 ft (109 m)
- Time zone: UTC-6 (Central (CST))
  - Summer (DST): UTC-5 (CDT)
- ZIP code: 38336
- Area code: 731
- GNIS feature ID: 1284989
- Fruitvale Historic District
- U.S. National Register of Historic Places
- U.S. Historic district
- Location within Tennessee Location within the United States
- Area: 1.95 acres (0.79 ha)
- NRHP reference No.: 12000943
- Added to NRHP: November 14, 2012

Fruitvale is an unincorporated rural community in Crockett County, Tennessee, United States. As of 2012, there were about 65 people living in Fruitvale. The village was listed on the National Register of Historic Places in 2012 as the Fruitvale Historic District.

== History ==
=== Establishment ===
The Fruitvale area was settled during the first half of the 19th century. At first it was known as Jackson Hollow. In the 1850s, the Memphis & Ohio (M&O) Railroad was built through the area. The site of Fruitvale started to be known as "The Switch" because a railroad switch and siding had been constructed there. The switch enabled the community to become a location for shipments from and to the surrounding area. By the last decade of the 19th century, the community was an important center for trade in perishable produce grown on nearby farms. By the 1870s, the community had acquired the "Fruitvale" name, reflecting its role as a shipping point for a large quantity of fruits and vegetables. The Fruitvale post office was established in 1893. Ten years later, a directory of local businesses listed a blacksmith shop, a sawmill, and several stores.

Brothers J.O. "Ollie" and Oscar Boyd established a grocery business in Fruitvale in 1906 and expanded their commercial interests in the subsequent years, adding the J.O. Boyd General Merchandise Store in 1918. Oscar Boyd sold his interest to his brother in 1920. During the 1920s Ollie Boyd, who also served as Fruitvale's postmaster, started a barber shop and built a potato barn and a pea/fertilizer shed. In 1930 he converted the barber shop building to house an office for management of his business interests. He made extensive land purchases, eventually accumulating 1,200 acres (490 ha) of farmland on which he produced a variety of crops and raised hogs, sheep, and cattle. The Boyd farming operations employed many seasonal migrant workers who were housed in bunkhouses that Boyd built in Fruitvale.

=== Later developments ===
Some time in the early 20th century, a large wooden fruit shed was built adjacent to the railroad siding. Rail cars could be parked adjacent to the shed for loading of food boxes and crates. A wooden crop scale was installed in 1925. In the late 1930s, electricity became available in Fruitvale, and Ollie Boyd built an electric-powered corn crusher to produce feed for beef cattle and hogs, as well as a tractor shed.

In 1920, Fruitvale had about 200 residents. In the years after World War II, Fruitvale lost population and agricultural shipping activity decreased. In 1965, the fruit shed was torn down and in 1980, the railroad switch was removed.

In 1993, the Fruitvale post office served only about 30 customers and was believed to be the smallest in Tennessee. It closed in 2010, but Fruitvale continues to be used as a postal place name. The ZIP code is 38336.

The Fruitvale Historic District was listed on the National Register of Historic Places in November 2012. It includes about 1.95 acres (0.79 ha) of land and nine buildings (two stores, the blacksmith shop, a bunkhouse, two sheds, a barn, the barbershop/office, the crusher house and the crop scale). All of the buildings in the district are contributing properties. At the time of listing, all of them belonged to the Boyd family.
