= Bumpus Mills, Tennessee =

Unincorporated community in Tennessee, US

Bumpus Mills
- Unincorporated community
- Location within Tennessee Location within the United States
- Coordinates: 36°36′17″N 87°50′15″W
- Country: United States
- State: Tennessee
- County: Stewart
- Elevation: 400 ft (120 m)
- Time zone: UTC-6 (Central (CST))
  - Summer (DST): UTC-5 (CDT)
- ZIP Code: 37028
- Area code: 931
- GNIS feature ID: 1278984

Bumpus Mills is an unincorporated community in Stewart County, Tennessee, United States.
