= McLemoresville, Tennessee =

- Town
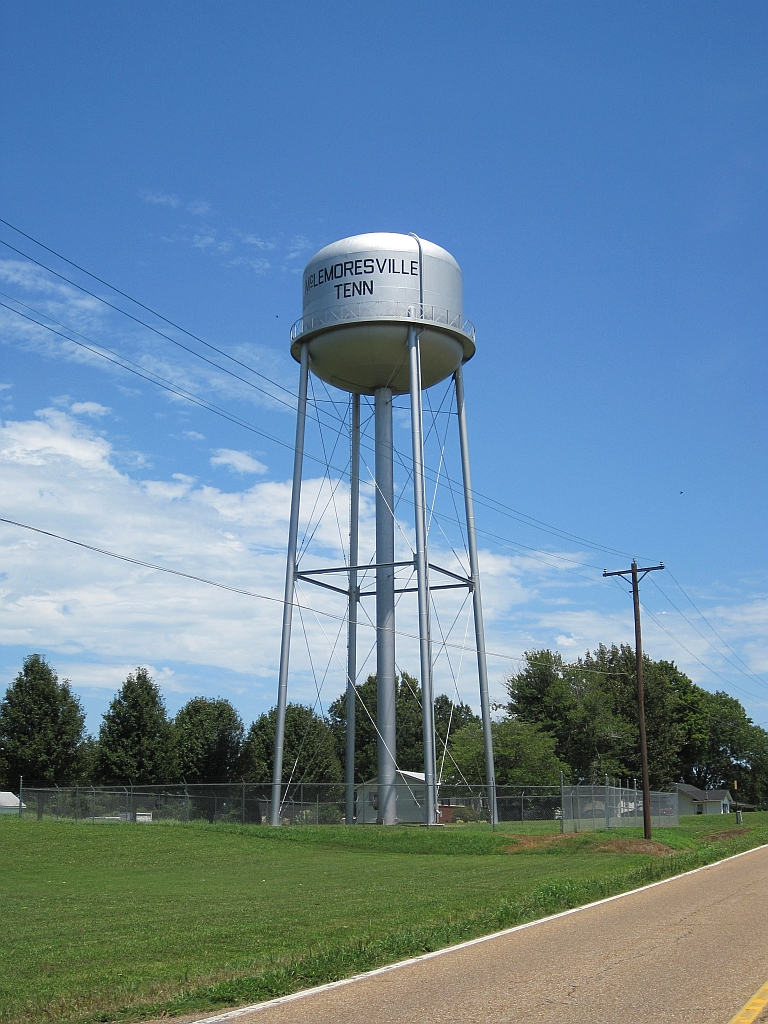

- Location of McLemoresville in Carroll County, Tennessee.

- Location of McLemoresville, Tennessee
- Coordinates: 35°59′15″N 88°34′39″W
- Country: United States
- State: Tennessee
- County: Carroll
- Founded: ca. 1820

Government
  - Mayor: Phil Williams

Area
  - Total: 2.20 sq mi (5.71 km^{2})
  - Land: 2.20 sq mi (5.71 km^{2})
  - Water: 0 sq mi (0.00 km^{2})
- Elevation: 420 ft (130 m)

Population (2020)
  - Total: 288
  - Density: 130.6/sq mi (50.42/km^{2})
- Time zone: UTC-6 (Central (CST))
  - Summer (DST): UTC-5 (CDT)
- ZIP code: 38235
- Area code: 731
- FIPS code: 47-45000
- GNIS feature ID: 1293406
- Website: http://www.cityofmclemoresville.com/

McLemoresville is a town in Carroll County, Tennessee, United States. As of the 2020 census, McLemoresville had a population of 288. It is notable primarily as the birthplace, and final resting place, of television star Dixie Carter and her husband, actor Hal Holbrook.

== History ==
McLemoresville was once, briefly in the 19th century, the county seat for Carroll County, and was the largest town in the county. Bethel College (later Bethel University), the Cumberland Presbyterian Church's only four-year liberal arts college, began in McLemoresville, as did the denomination's theological school. Both later relocated to McKenzie, after the railroad companies laid down tracks in the mid-19th century and did not include McLemoresville. The town then started its decline. Later, in the 1950s, the Theological School moved to Memphis, where it was renamed Memphis Theological Seminary.

The town once had, in the mid-19th century, over 11 saloons, and several schools with boarding facilities, including the McLemoresville Collegiate Institute, the McLemoresville Women's Collegiate Institute, and others. It had several inns and restaurants.

The town's high school burned in the 1940s or 1950s and was not replaced. The school continued to educate children through the eighth grade. A new building was erected around 1958, and this building, with additions and modifications, now houses the grades K-2 for West Carroll School District.

The old McLemoresville Elementary School, which included a junior high school, participated in basketball and band. It was particularly successful in band and boys' basketball in the mid-to-late 1960s, winning county tournaments and band competitions around West Tennessee and the state. The school held annual beauty pageants for girls, had a very active Parents-Teachers Association, and the school partially integrated in 1965 and fully in 1966 (both without event) with the closure of the old MTA School for African-American students. It was also known as Carrollton.

The town is called “McLey” (pronounced “MACK Lee”) by local residents.

Dixie Carter was born in McLemoresville and interred there after her death in 2010. She worked with architect Hoyte Johnson to renovate her home and create a music room to share with her family, friends, and the nearby Huntingdon College. Her mother, Virginia Carter, built the fireplaces and mantels in the older parts of the house, as well as the wooden guest house beneath the ancient catalpa trees in the back yard. Her father, Halbert Carter (Hal) collected books that line the back room walls.

Mayor Phil Williams has been holding his seat for 50 years (as of 2024), making him the longest serving mayor in Tennessee history.

The city holds a rental space for events called the McLemorseville Activities Center, commonly known as the "MAC".

== Geography ==
McLemoresville is located in western Carroll County at 35°59′15″N 88°34′39″W (35.987380, -88.577368).

According to the United States Census Bureau, the town has a total area of 2.6 square miles (6.7 km^{2}), all land.

McLemoresville is located at the intersection of U.S. Route 70A (Main Street/State Route 77) and State Route 105 (W College Street).

== Demographics ==
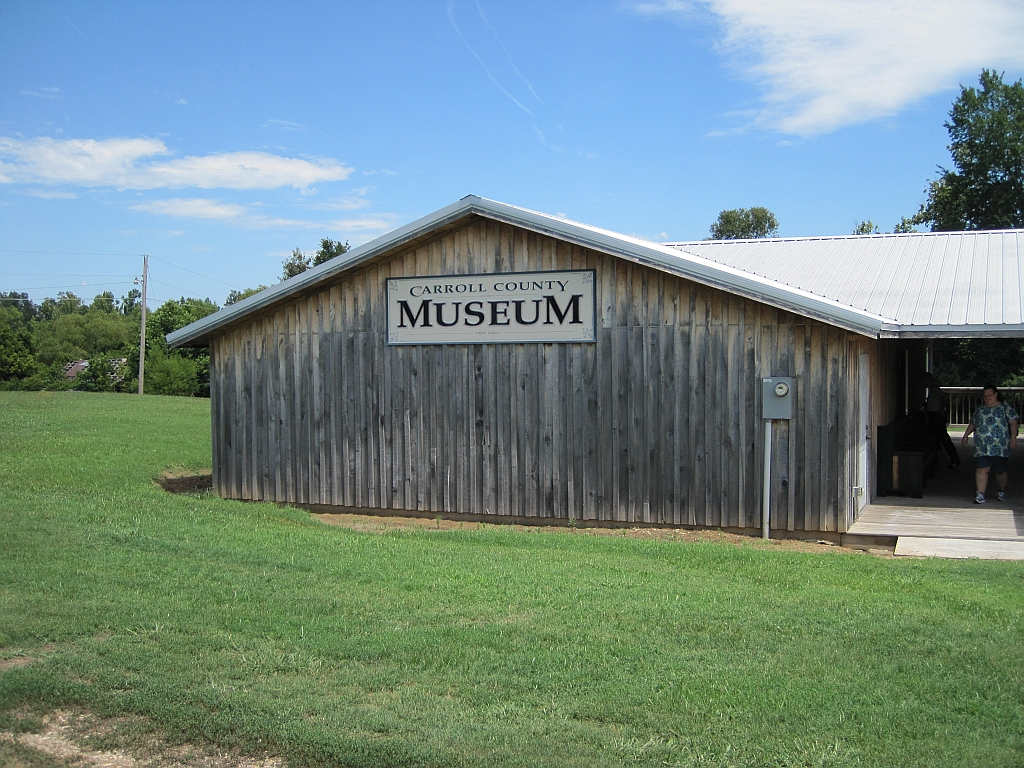
Carroll County Museum McLemoresville, Tennessee

Historical population
Census	Pop.	Note	%±
1880	151		—
1950	242		—
1960	285		17.8%
1970	328		15.1%
1980	311		−5.2%
1990	280		−10.0%
2000	259		−7.5%
2010	352		35.9%
2020	288		−18.2%

As of the census of 2000, there were 259 people, 119 households, and 81 families residing in the town. The population density was 347.9 inhabitants per square mile (134.3/km^{2}). There were 134 housing units at an average density of 180.0 units per square mile (69.5 units/km^{2}). The racial makeup of the town was 90.35% White, 6.18% African American, 0.39% Native American, 2.70% from other races, and 0.39% from two or more races. Hispanic or Latino of any race were 2.70% of the population.

There were 119 households, out of which 24.4% had children under the age of 18 living with them, 56.3% were married couples living together, 7.6% had a female householder with no husband present, and 31.1% were non-families. 30.3% of all households were made up of individuals, and 18.5% had someone living alone who was 65 years of age or older. The average household size was 2.18 and the average family size was 2.67.

In the town, the population was spread out, with 21.2% under the age of 18, 5.0% from 18 to 24, 27.4% from 25 to 44, 25.1% from 45 to 64, and 21.2% who were 65 years of age or older. The median age was 43 years. For every 100 females, there were 100.8 males. For every 100 females age 18 and over, there were 94.3 males.

The median income for a household in the town was $29,318, and the median income for a family was $37,083. Males had a median income of $35,417 versus $24,167 for females. The per capita income for the town was $15,962. About 2.6% of families and 4.3% of the population were below the poverty line, including none of those under the age of eighteen and 9.6% of those 65 or over.

== Media ==
Radio stations:

- WTPR-AM 710 "The Greatest Hits of All Time"

Newspapers:

- Carroll County News-Leader
