= Henry, Tennessee =

- Town
- Location in Henry County, Tennessee
- Coordinates: 36°12′8″N 88°25′6″W
- Country: United States
- State: Tennessee
- County: Henry

Area
  - Total: 1.29 sq mi (3.33 km^{2})
  - Land: 1.29 sq mi (3.33 km^{2})
  - Water: 0 sq mi (0.00 km^{2})
- Elevation: 548 ft (167 m)

Population (2020)
  - Total: 446
  - Density: 347.1/sq mi (134.01/km^{2})
- Time zone: UTC-6 (Central (CST))
  - Summer (DST): UTC-5 (CDT)
- ZIP code: 38231
- Area code: 731
- FIPS code: 47-33400
- GNIS feature ID: 1287430
- Website: https://www.cityofhenry.com/

Henry is a town in Henry County, Tennessee. As of the 2020 census, Henry had a population of 446. Gospel singer Bobby Jones was born here.

== Geography ==
Henry is located in southwestern Henry County at 36°12′8″N 88°25′6″W (36.202197, -88.418208). U.S. Route 79 runs through the eastern and southern sides of the town, leading northeast 9 miles (14 km) to Paris, the county seat, and southwest 7 miles (11 km) to McKenzie.

According to the United States Census Bureau, the town has a total area of 1.4 square miles (3.7 km^{2}), all land.

== Demographics ==
Historical population
Census	Pop.	Note	%±
1880	146		—
1910	198		—
1920	230		16.2%
1930	241		4.8%
1940	232		−3.7%
1950	200		−13.8%
1960	178		−11.0%
1970	302		69.7%
1980	295		−2.3%
1990	317		7.5%
2000	520		64.0%
2010	464		−10.8%
2020	446		−3.9%

As of the census of 2000, there were 520 people, 191 households, and 141 families residing in the town. The population density was 434.2 inhabitants per square mile (167.6/km^{2}). There were 207 housing units at an average density of 172.9 per square mile (66.8/km^{2}). The racial makeup of the town was 82.88% White, 14.42% African American, 0.38% Native American, 2.31% from other races. Hispanic or Latino of any race were 6.73% of the population.

There were 191 households, out of which 40.3% had children under the age of 18 living with them, 52.4% were married couples living together, 19.4% had a female householder with no husband present, and 25.7% were non-families. 20.9% of all households were made up of individuals, and 7.9% had someone living alone who was 65 years of age or older. The average household size was 2.72 and the average family size was 3.16.

In the town, the population was spread out, with 30.2% under the age of 18, 8.7% from 18 to 24, 31.5% from 25 to 44, 19.0% from 45 to 64, and 10.6% who were 65 years of age or older. The median age was 33 years. For every 100 females, there were 89.8 males. For every 100 females age 18 and over, there were 88.1 males.

The median income for a household in the town was $26,333, and the median income for a family was $30,714. Males had a median income of $21,250 versus $21,667 for females. The per capita income for the town was $12,663. About 15.0% of families and 18.7% of the population were below the poverty line, including 22.4% of those under age 18 and 12.5% of those age 65 or over.
