= Gadsden, Tennessee =

- Town
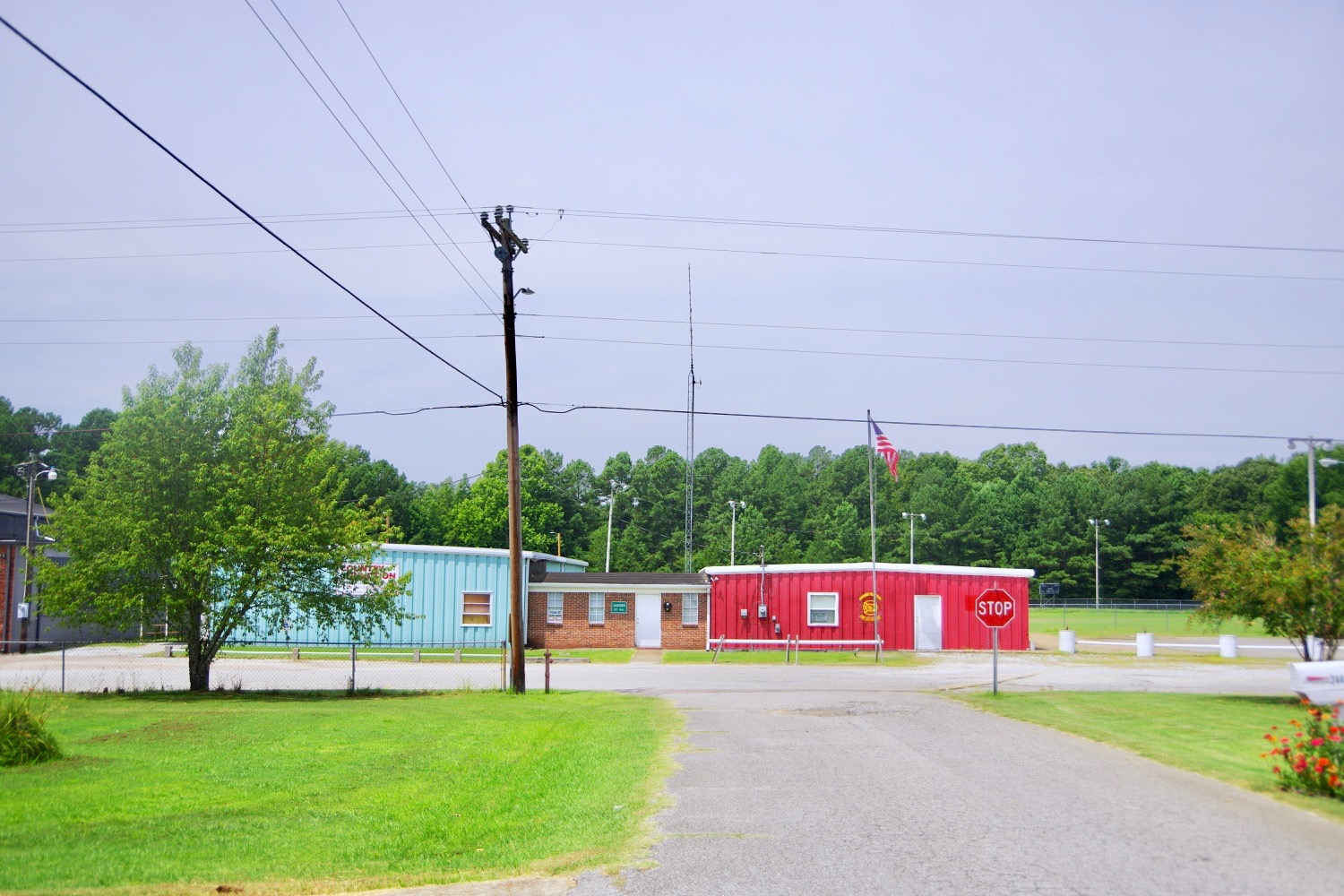
- City Hall and Volunteer Fire Department

- Location of Gadsden in Crockett County, Tennessee.
- Coordinates: 35°46′38″N 88°59′26″W
- Country: United States
- State: Tennessee
- County: Crockett

Area
  - Total: 1.12 sq mi (2.90 km^{2})
  - Land: 1.12 sq mi (2.90 km^{2})
  - Water: 0 sq mi (0.00 km^{2})
- Elevation: 413 ft (126 m)

Population (2020)
  - Total: 469
  - Density: 418.6/sq mi (161.64/km^{2})
- Time zone: UTC-6 (Central (CST))
  - Summer (DST): UTC-5 (CDT)
- ZIP code: 38337
- Area code: 731
- FIPS code: 47-28380
- GNIS feature ID: 1285062

Gadsden is a town in Crockett County, Tennessee, United States. As of the 2020 census, Gadsden had a population of 469. It is the birthplace of Hall of Fame rock guitarist Scotty Moore, who played with Elvis Presley and Ricky Nelson.

== History ==
Gadsden was established in the mid-19th century as a stop along the Memphis, Clarksville and Louisville Railroad. It was named for prominent U.S. diplomat James Gadsden (1788–1858), who was responsible for the Gadsden Purchase.

== Geography ==
Gadsden is located at 35°46′38″N 88°59′26″W (35.777300, -88.990442). The town lies northeast of Jackson along a congruent stretch of U.S. Route 70 and U.S. Route 79. Tennessee State Route 221 intersects this highway toward the center of town. Humboldt lies to the northeast along US 79, and Bells lies to the southwest.

According to the United States Census Bureau, the town has a total area of 1.1 square miles (2.8 km^{2}), all land.

== Demographics ==
Historical population
Census	Pop.	Note	%±
1880	231		—
1890	267		15.6%
1900	229		−14.2%
1950	255		—
1960	222		−12.9%
1970	523		135.6%
1980	683		30.6%
1990	561		−17.9%
2000	553		−1.4%
2010	470		−15.0%
2020	469		−0.2%

As of the census of 2000, there were 553 people, 216 households, and 160 families residing in the town. The population density was 502.8 inhabitants per square mile (194.1/km^{2}). There were 228 housing units at an average density of 207.3 per square mile (80.0/km^{2}). The racial makeup of the town was 83.54% White, 14.83% African American, 0.18% Native American, 1.08% from other races, and 0.36% from two or more races. Hispanic or Latino of any race were 1.08% of the population.

There were 216 households, out of which 29.6% had children under the age of 18 living with them, 55.6% were married couples living together, 13.0% had a female householder with no husband present, and 25.9% were non-families. 23.1% of all households were made up of individuals, and 7.9% had someone living alone who was 65 years of age or older. The average household size was 2.56 and the average family size was 3.04.

In the town, the population was spread out, with 24.8% under the age of 18, 8.0% from 18 to 24, 25.5% from 25 to 44, 27.1% from 45 to 64, and 14.6% who were 65 years of age or older. The median age was 39 years. For every 100 females, there were 90.7 males. For every 100 females age 18 and over, there were 90.0 males.

The median income for a household in the town was $38,750, and the median income for a family was $41,583. Males had a median income of $26,771 versus $21,250 for females. The per capita income for the town was $13,506. About 11.0% of families and 15.9% of the population were below the poverty line, including 23.3% of those under age 18 and 6.1% of those age 65 or over.
