= Three Way, Tennessee =

Three Way
- City
- Location of Three Way in Madison County, Tennessee.
- Coordinates: 35°46′35″N 88°51′4″W
- Country: United States
- State: Tennessee
- County: Madison
- Incorporated: 1998

Area
  - Total: 4.49 sq mi (11.63 km^{2})
  - Land: 4.49 sq mi (11.63 km^{2})
  - Water: 0 sq mi (0.00 km^{2})
- Elevation: 433 ft (132 m)

Population (2020)
  - Total: 1,877
  - Density: 417.9/sq mi (161.37/km^{2})
- Time zone: UTC-6 (Central (CST))
  - Summer (DST): UTC-5 (CDT)
- ZIP code: 38343
- Area code: 731
- FIPS code: 47-74100
- GNIS feature ID: 1848108
- Website: cityofthreeway.org

Three Way is a city in Madison County, Tennessee. As of the 2020 census, Three Way had a population of 1,877. It is included in the Jackson, Tennessee Metropolitan Statistical Area.

Before the city was officially incorporated in 1998, the area was commonly known as "Three Way" for many years because of the split by U.S. Route 45 along its north–south route into US 45W towards Humboldt and US 45E towards Milan .

== Geography ==
Three Way is located at 35°46′35″N 88°51′4″W (35.776424, -88.851111).

According to the United States Census Bureau, the city has a total area of 3.9 square miles (10 km^{2}), all land.

== Demographics ==
Historical population
Census	Pop.	Note	%±
2000	1,375		—
2010	1,709		24.3%
2020	1,877		9.8%

=== 2020 census ===
As of the 2020 census, Three Way had a population of 1,877. The median age was 48.6 years. 18.0% of residents were under the age of 18 and 21.8% of residents were 65 years of age or older. For every 100 females there were 99.5 males, and for every 100 females age 18 and over there were 96.3 males age 18 and over. 0.0% of residents lived in urban areas, while 100.0% lived in rural areas. There were 793 households in Three Way, of which 26.4% had children under the age of 18 living in them. Of all households, 63.9% were married-couple households, 13.9% were households with a male householder and no spouse or partner present, and 19.0% were households with a female householder and no spouse or partner present. About 20.6% of all households were made up of individuals and 7.4% had someone living alone who was 65 years of age or older. There were 828 housing units, of which 4.2% were vacant. The homeowner vacancy rate was 1.3% and the rental vacancy rate was 3.1%.

Racial composition as of the 2020 census
Race	Number	Percent
White	1,428	76.1%
Black or African American	348	18.5%
American Indian and Alaska Native	2	0.1%
Asian	12	0.6%
Native Hawaiian and Other Pacific Islander	0	0.0%
Some other race	28	1.5%
Two or more races	59	3.1%
Hispanic or Latino (of any race)	54	2.9%

=== 2000 census ===
As of the 2000 census, there was a population of 1,375, with 499 households and 421 families residing in the city. The population density was 354.4 inhabitants per square mile (136.8/km^{2}). There were 510 housing units at an average density of 131.4 per square mile (50.7/km^{2}). The racial makeup of the city was 94.33% White, 4.65% African American, 0.29% Asian, 0.22% from other races, and 0.51% from two or more races. Hispanic or Latino of any race were 1.75% of the population.

There were 499 households, out of which 45.1% had children under the age of 18 living with them, 79.6% were married couples living together, 3.6% had a female householder with no husband present, and 15.6% were non-families. 13.6% of all households were made up of individuals, and 3.6% had someone living alone who was 65 years of age or older. The average household size was 2.76 and the average family size was 3.04.

In the city, the population was spread out, with 28.3% under the age of 18, 4.5% from 18 to 24, 37.5% from 25 to 44, 22.6% from 45 to 64, and 7.1% who were 65 years of age or older. The median age was 36 years. For every 100 females, there were 95.0 males. For every 100 females age 18 and over, there were 98.4 males.

The median income for a household in the city was $62,135, and the median income for a family was $67,188. Males had a median income of $40,769 versus $31,541 for females. The per capita income for the city was $23,313. About 2.6% of families and 4.0% of the population were below the poverty line, including 6.4% of those under age 18 and 20.8% of those age 65 or over.

== Recreation ==
Three Way is the location of Middle Fork Bottoms State Park.
