= Atwood, Tennessee =

- Town
- Location of Atwood in Carroll County, Tennessee.

- Location of Atwood, Tennessee
- Coordinates: 35°58′47″N 88°40′3″W
- Country: United States
- State: Tennessee
- County: Carroll
- Incorporated: 1941

Government
  - Mayor: Fridie Algee Jr

Area
  - Total: 1.73 sq mi (4.49 km^{2})
  - Land: 1.73 sq mi (4.49 km^{2})
  - Water: 0 sq mi (0.00 km^{2})
- Elevation: 443 ft (135 m)

Population (2020)
  - Total: 940
  - Density: 542.1/sq mi (209.31/km^{2})
- Time zone: UTC-6 (Central (CST))
  - Summer (DST): UTC-5 (CDT)
- ZIP code: 38220
- Area code: 731
- FIPS code: 47-02380
- GNIS feature ID: 1275974

Atwood is a town in Carroll County, Tennessee, United States. The population was 1,008 at the 2020 census.

Atwood was incorporated as a town in 1941.

== Geography ==
According to the United States Census Bureau, the town has a total area of 1.9 square miles (4.9 km^{2}), all land.

== Demographics ==
Historical population
Census	Pop.	Note	%±
1960	461		—
1970	937		103.3%
1980	1,143		22.0%
1990	1,066		−6.7%
2000	1,000		−6.2%
2010	938		−6.2%
2020	940		0.2%

At the 2000 census, there were 1,000 people, 430 households and 304 families residing in the town. The population density was 525.7 inhabitants per square mile (203.0/km^{2}). There were 460 housing units at an average density of 241.8 units per square mile (93.4 units/km^{2}). The racial makeup of the town was 83.00% White, 15.90% African American, 0.10% Native American, 0.30% from other races, and 0.70% from two or more races. Hispanic or Latino of any race were 0.80% of the population.

There were 430 households, of which 24.4% had children under the age of 18 living with them, 57.2% were married couples living together, 11.6% had a female householder with no husband present, and 29.3% were non-families. 27.7% of all households were made up of individuals, and 12.8% had someone living alone who was 65 years of age or older. The average household size was 2.33 and the average family size was 2.82.

20.5% of the population were under the age of 18, 8.5% from 18 to 24, 25.6% from 25 to 44, 26.9% from 45 to 64, and 18.5% who were 65 years of age or older. The median age was 41 years. For every 100 females, there were 90.5 males. For every 100 females age 18 and over, there were 84.0 males.

The median household income was $30,000 and the median family income was $39,464. Males had a median income of $29,375 compared with $22,500 for females. The per capita income for the town was $14,354. About 13.4% of families and 15.1% of the population were below the poverty line, including 25.1% of those under age 18 and 12.7% of those age 65 or over.

== Media ==
=== Radio stations ===
- WTPR-AM 710 "The Greatest Hits of All Time"

=== Newspapers ===
- Carroll County News-Leader
