= Trezevant, Tennessee =

- Town
- Location of Trezevant in Carroll County, Tennessee.

- Location of Trezevant, Tennessee
- Coordinates: 36°0′38″N 88°37′23″W
- Country: United States
- State: Tennessee
- County: Carroll
- Founded: 1857
- Incorporated: 1911
- Named for: Jim Trezevant, railroad engineer

Government
  - Mayor: Bobby J. Blaylock

Area
  - Total: 1.42 sq mi (3.68 km^{2})
  - Land: 1.42 sq mi (3.68 km^{2})
  - Water: 0 sq mi (0.00 km^{2})
- Elevation: 459 ft (140 m)

Population (2020)
  - Total: 799
  - Density: 562.3/sq mi (217.09/km^{2})
- Time zone: UTC-6 (Central (CST))
  - Summer (DST): UTC-5 (CDT)
- ZIP code: 38258
- Area code: 731
- FIPS code: 47-75100
- GNIS feature ID: 1304162
- Website: http://carrollcounty-tn-chamber.com/index-3.htm

Trezevant is a town in Carroll County, Tennessee. The population was 799 at the 2020 census and 859 at the 2010 census.

== History ==
The town was established in 1859 on lands belonging to locals L. B. White and W. A. Marshall. The first merchants in Trezevant were A. White and R. H. Algee, who was also the first postmaster. In 1860, The Memphis & Louisville Railroad built a line through the town and constructed a depot.

== Geography ==
Trezevant is located at 36°0′38″N 88°37′23″W (36.010512, -88.622921).

According to the United States Census Bureau, the town has a total area of 1.4 square miles (3.6 km^{2}), all land.

== Demographics ==
Historical population
Census	Pop.	Note	%±
1880	327		—
1920	587		—
1930	547		−6.8%
1940	527		−3.7%
1950	765		45.2%
1960	944		23.4%
1970	877		−7.1%
1980	921		5.0%
1990	874		−5.1%
2000	901		3.1%
2010	859		−4.7%
2020	799		−7.0%

As of the census of 2000, there were 901 people, 390 households, and 255 families residing in the town. The population density was 651.0 inhabitants per square mile (251.4/km^{2}). There were 429 housing units at an average density of 310.0 per square mile (119.7/km^{2}). The racial makeup of the town was 85.68% White, 13.32% African American, 0.11% from other races, and 0.89% from two or more races. Hispanic or Latino of any race were 1.66% of the population.

There were 390 households, out of which 27.9% had children under the age of 18 living with them, 48.5% were married couples living together, 11.8% had a female householder with no husband present, and 34.6% were non-families. 31.5% of all households were made up of individuals, and 19.2% had someone living alone who was 65 years of age or older. The average household size was 2.31 and the average family size was 2.90.

In the town, the population was spread out, with 23.0% under the age of 18, 7.0% from 18 to 24, 27.5% from 25 to 44, 22.0% from 45 to 64, and 20.5% who were 65 years of age or older. The median age was 40 years. For every 100 females, there were 89.7 males. For every 100 females age 18 and over, there were 81.2 males.

The median income for a household in the town was $22,045, and the median income for a family was $30,917. Males had a median income of $28,482 versus $18,021 for females. The per capita income for the town was $13,969. About 17.9% of families and 21.1% of the population were below the poverty line, including 27.3% of those under age 18 and 21.8% of those age 65 or over.
