= Tennessee State Route 202 =

State highway in Tennessee, United States

State Route 202
- SR 202 highlighted in red

Route information
- Maintained by TDOT
- Length: 20.5 mi (33.0 km)
- Existed: July 1, 1983–present

Major junctions
- South end: SR 69 near Saltillo
- US 641 near Decaturville; SR 100 in Decaturville
- North end: US 412 in Beacon

Location
- Country: United States
- State: Tennessee
- Counties: Decatur

Highway system
- Tennessee State Routes; Interstate; US; State
| ← SR 201 | → SR 203 |

State Route 202 (SR 202) is a 20.5-mile-long (33.0 km) north–south state highway in Decatur County, Tennessee, connecting Saltillo with Beacon via Decaturville.

== Route description ==
SR 202 begins at an intersection with SR 69, just northeast of Saltillo. It heads north as Brooksie Thompson Road to pass through rural areas to have an intersection with SR 114. The highway continues to wind its way north to come to an intersection and become concurrent with US 641/SR 69. They then head north to enter Decaturville, where they bypass downtown to the west and have an intersection with SR 100. SR 202 then splits off onto Middleburg Road to leave Decaturville and head west to pass through wooded areas and farmland. It then has an intersection with SR 201, where it turns north along Beacon Road to cross a bridge over the Beech River and pass through the community of Beacon before coming to an end at an intersection with US 412/SR 20. The entire route of SR 202 is a two-lane highway.

== Major intersections ==
The entire route is in Decatur County.

| Location | mi | km | Destinations | Notes |
|---|---|---|---|---|
| | 0.0 | 0.0 | SR 69 – Saltillo, Bath Springs | Southern terminus |
| | | | SR 114 – Clifton, Scotts Hill | |
| | | | US 641 south (SR 69 south) – Clifton | Southern end of US 641/SR 69 concurrency |
| Decaturville | | | SR 100 (W Main Street) – Scotts Hill, Downtown, Perryville, Linden | |
| Decaturville | | | US 641 north (SR 69 north) – Parsons | Northern end of US 641/SR 69 concurrency |
| | | | SR 201 south (Middleburg Road) | Northern terminus of SR 201 |
| | | | Bridge over the Beech River | |
| Beacon | 20.5 | 33.0 | US 412 (SR 20) – Lexington, Chesterfield, Parsons | Northern terminus |
1.000 mi = 1.609 km; 1.000 km = 0.621 mi: Concurrency terminus
