= U.S. Route 641 =

Highway in the United States

U.S. Route 641
- US 641 highlighted in red

Route information
- Auxiliary route of US 41
- Length: 165.45 mi (266.27 km)

Major junctions
- South end: US 64 near Clifton, TN
- US 412 at Parsons, TN; I-40 near Holladay, TN; US 70 at Camden, TN; US 70 Bus. at Camden, TN; US 79 at Paris, TN; KY 80 near Murray, KY; US 68 near Draffenville, KY; US 62 near Calvert City, KY; I-24 / I-69 at Kuttawa, KY; US 62 near Eddyville, KY
- North end: US 60 / KY 91 at Marion, KY

Location
- Country: United States
- States: Tennessee, Kentucky
- Counties: TN: Wayne, Hardin, Decatur, Benton, Henry; KY: Calloway, Marshall, Livingston, Lyon, Caldwell, Crittenden

Highway system
- United States Numbered Highway System; List; Special; Divided
← I-640	TN	→ SR 690
← KY 640	KY	→ KY 643

U.S. Route 641 (US 641) is a U.S. Route in Tennessee and Kentucky. It runs for 165.45 miles (266.27 km) from US 64 south of Clifton, Tennessee to an intersection with US 60 in Marion, Kentucky. While it is considered a spur route of U.S. Route 41, the two routes no longer connect.

== Route description ==
=== Tennessee ===
US 641 begins at an intersection with US 64 south of Clifton. North of that city, it runs concurrently with SR 69. US 641 intersects US 412 in Parsons, I-40 near Holladay, and US 70 in Camden. In Paris, US 641 intersects US 79; it also separates from SR 69 and begins a concurrency with SR 54 that it maintains until the Kentucky state line.

=== Kentucky ===
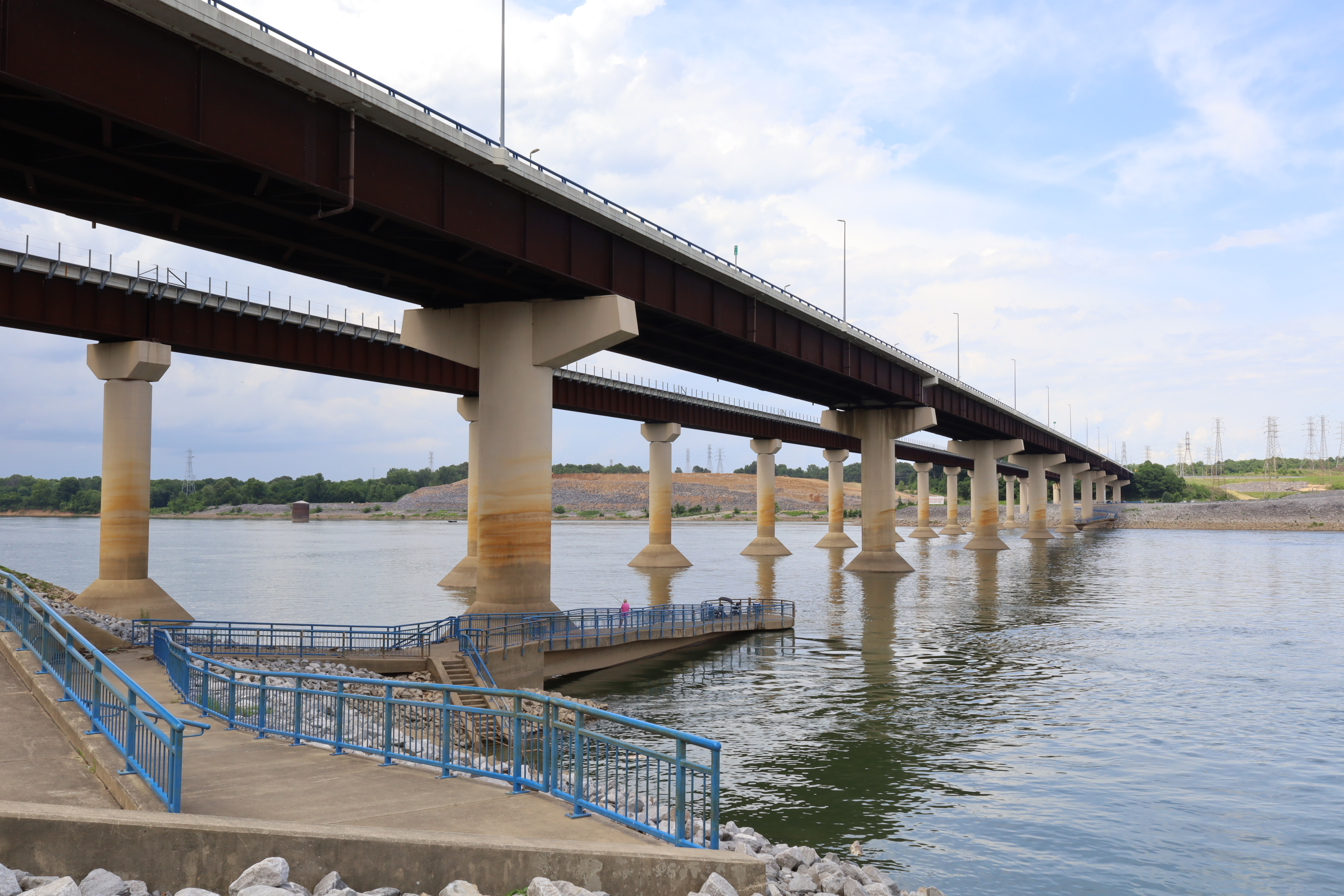
The George A. Ellis Bridge (foreground) carries U.S. 62 and U.S. 641 over the Tennessee River.

US 641 enters Kentucky at Hazel and continues north to Murray, intersecting KY 80 just north of the city limit. Near Benton, a spur route (Spur US 641) provides access to I-69 (the Purchase Parkway) while the main route travels through the city. US 641 has a concurrency with US 62 beginning near Calvert City; the routes cross I-24 / I-69 before separating in Eddyville. The route intersects KY 70 in Fredonia. The US 641 designation ends at US 60 in Marion.

== History ==
U.S. Route 641 was designated by AASHO in 1951 out of a desire on the part of Indiana, Kentucky and Tennessee highway officials to create a single numbered route to connect Memphis, Tennessee to Evansville, Indiana via the popular tourist attraction Kentucky Dam. In 1968, the 4.9-mile Indiana portion of its route was relinquished. Indiana highway officials, in their request to decommission the route, advised that 641 "serves no useful purpose" and had, indeed, not been marked in Evansville for "a number of years."

Its northern section from Marion to Henderson, Kentucky, which was concurrent with U.S. Route 60, was eliminated and its northern terminus has since remained Marion. In 1977, US 641 was extended southward along the path of Tennessee State Route 69 to its interchange with I-40 (Exit 126) near Holladay, Tennessee with SR 69 continuing south beyond the interchange.

In November 2014, the American Association of State Highway and Transportation Officials approved a southern extension of the US 641 designation along SR 69 and SR 114, from the former southern terminus at I-40 to the current end at US 64 in Wayne County.

== Major intersections ==
The mileposts listed in the following table is only an estimated calculation. Actual mile markers may vary.

State	County	Location	mi	km	Destinations	Notes
Tennessee	Wayne	Clifton Junction	0.0	0.0	US 64 (Savannah Highway/SR 15) – Savannah, Waynesboro	Southern terminus of US 641 and SR 114; Southern end of unsigned SR 114 concurrency
Tennessee	Wayne	Clifton	7.34	11.81	SR 128 east (W Pillow Street) – Clifton, Linden	Southern end of SR 128 concurrency
Tennessee	Hardin		8.67	13.95	SR 128 south (New Highway 128) – Savannah	Northern end of SR 128 concurrency
Tennessee	Tennessee River		11.12– 11.68	17.90– 18.80	Bridge over Kentucky Lake	
Tennessee	Decatur		13.7	22.0	SR 69 south / SR 114 north – Bath Springs, Saltillo	Northern end of unsigned SR 114 concurrency; southern end of unsigned SR 69 concurrency
Tennessee	Decatur		21.9	35.2	SR 202 south (Brooksie Thompson Road)	Southern end of SR 202 concurrency
Tennessee	Decatur	Decaturville	25.3	40.7	SR 100 (W Main Street) – Henderson, Scotts Hill, Decaturville	
Tennessee	Decatur	Decaturville	25.9	41.7	SR 202 north (Middleburg Road) – Beacon	Northern end of SR 202 concurrency
Tennessee	Decatur		27.5– 27.6	44.3– 44.4	Arthur F. Tolley Bridge over the Beech River	
Tennessee	Decatur	Parsons	30.6	49.2	US 412 (Main Street/SR 20) – Lexington, Linden	
Tennessee	Decatur	Holladay	44.6	71.8	I-40 – Memphis, Nashville	Former southern terminus; I-40 exit 126
Tennessee	Benton	Holladay	46.3	74.5	SR 192 north – Pauline	Southern terminus of SR 192; former US 641/SR 69 through Holladay
Tennessee	Benton		53.5	86.1	SR 192 south (Old Hwy 69) – Holladay	Northern terminus of SR 192; former US 641/SR 69 through Holladay
Tennessee	Benton		58.3	93.8	US 70 (SR 1) – Bruceton, Hollow Rock, New Johnsonville, Waverly	
Tennessee	Benton	Camden	59.8	96.2	US 70 Bus. (W Main Street/SR 391) to SR 69A – Downtown, Bruceton	
Tennessee	Henry	Paris	78.6	126.5	SR 218 (Paris Bypass)	Beltway around Paris
Tennessee	Henry	Paris	79.5	127.9	SR 69A south (Memorial Drive) – Big Sandy	Northern terminus of SR 69A; former routing of US 641/SR 69
Tennessee	Henry	Paris	80.2	129.1	SR 77 west (Mineral Wells Avenue) – Huntingdon	Eastern terminus of SR 77
Tennessee	Henry	Paris	81.0	130.4	US 79 (Tyson Avenue/SR 76) – McKenzie, Dover	
Tennessee	Henry	Paris	81.9	131.8	SR 54 west / SR 69 north / SR 356 east (Wood Street) – Dresden, Cottage Grove, Buchanan, Paris Landing State Park	Northern end of unsigned SR 69 concurrency; southern end of unsigned SR 54 concurrency; western terminus of SR 356; SR 356 is a former alignment of US 79/SR 76
Tennessee	Henry		85.7	137.9	SR 218 north (Paris Bypass)	Beltway around Paris; current southern terminus of SR 218
Tennessee	Henry	Puryear	91.9	147.9	SR 140 east (Poplar Street) – Buchanan, Paris Landing State Park	Southern end of SR 140 concurrency
Tennessee	Henry	Puryear	92.0	148.1	SR 140 west (W Chestnut Street) – Cottage Grove	Northern end of SR 140 concurrency
			95.87 0.000	154.29 0.000	Tennessee–Kentucky state line Northern end of unsigned SR 54 concurrency	
Kentucky	Calloway	Hazel	0.009	0.014	KY 893 west (W Stateline Rd)	South end of KY 893 concurrency
Kentucky	Calloway	Hazel	0.069	0.111	KY 893 east (E Stateline Rd)	North end of KY 893 concurrency
Kentucky	Calloway	Murray	3.556	5.723	KY 1828 (Midway Rd)	
Kentucky	Calloway	Murray	6.666	10.728	US 641 Bus. (Glendale Rd) / KY 1550	
Kentucky	Calloway	Murray	7.169	11.537	KY 821 (Sycamore St)	
Kentucky	Calloway	Murray	7.699	12.390	KY 94 (Main St) – Water Valley	
Kentucky	Calloway	Murray	8.143	13.105	US 641 Bus. (Chestnut St) / KY 1327	
Kentucky	Calloway	Murray	8.633	13.893	KY 121 – Mayfield	
Kentucky	Calloway	Murray	9.710	15.627	KY 2075 (N 4th St)	
Kentucky	Calloway		10.620	17.091	KY 80 – Mayfield, Hopkinsville	
Kentucky	Calloway		11.775	18.950	KY 1429	
Kentucky	Calloway		12.348	19.872	KY 1824	
Kentucky	Calloway		13.829	22.256	KY 464 – Kirksey, Almo	
Kentucky	Calloway	Dexter	16.929	27.245	KY 1346	
Kentucky	Marshall	Hardin	18.668	30.043	KY 402	
Kentucky	Marshall		22.774	36.651	US 641 Spur / KY 1824 to I-69	
Kentucky	Marshall		23.434	37.713	KY 1518	
Kentucky	Marshall	Benton	25.559	41.133	KY 1445	
Kentucky	Marshall	Benton	25.714	41.383	KY 58 west / KY 408 – Mayfield	South end of KY 58 concurrency
Kentucky	Marshall	Benton	26.002	41.846	KY 408	
Kentucky	Marshall	Benton	26.259	42.260	KY 348	
Kentucky	Marshall	Benton	26.363	42.427	KY 2609	
Kentucky	Marshall		28.912	46.529	KY 58 east / KY 795 – Briensburg, Scale	North end of KY 58 concurrency
Kentucky	Marshall	Draffenville	30.306	48.773	US 68 east – Hopkinsville	South end of US 68 concurrency
Kentucky	Marshall	Draffenville	30.722	49.442	US 68 west to I-69 – Paducah	North end of US 68 concurrency
Kentucky	Marshall		32.518	52.333	KY 1422 – Tatumsville, Palma	
Kentucky	Marshall		36.122	58.133	KY 2595	
Kentucky	Marshall		37.110	59.723	US 62 west to I-24 / KY 282 – Calvert City	Interchange; south end of US 62 concurrency
Kentucky	Livingston		39.584	63.704	KY 453 (Dover Rd)	Interchange
Kentucky	Livingston	Lake City	40.072	64.490	KY 952 (J. R. O'Bryan Ave)	
Kentucky	Livingston		41.009	65.998	KY 917 (Stringtown Rd)	
Kentucky	Lyon	Suwanee	44.944	72.330	KY 810 north	South end of KY 810 concurrency
Kentucky	Lyon	Suwanee	45.010	72.437	KY 810 south	North end of KY 810 concurrency
Kentucky	Lyon		47.370	76.235	KY 93 west / KY 295	South end of KY 93 concurrency
Kentucky	Lyon		47.724	76.804	KY 6011 (Mary Blue Rd)	
Kentucky	Lyon		48.063	77.350	I-24 / I-69 – Madisonville, Clarksville	Interchange
Kentucky	Lyon	Eddyville	49.422	79.537	KY 295	
Kentucky	Lyon	Eddyville	49.510	79.679	KY 373	
Kentucky	Lyon	Eddyville	50.193	80.778	KY 93	North end of KY 93 concurrency
Kentucky	Lyon	Eddyville	51.739	83.266	US 62 east / KY 3305 (Riley Rd) – Princeton	North end of US 62 concurrency
Kentucky	Lyon		54.407	87.560	KY 1943	
Kentucky	Lyon		54.894	88.343	KY 3169 (New Bethel Church Rd)	
Kentucky	Caldwell	Fredonia	60.331	97.093	KY 70 east / KY 91 east (Marion Rd) – Madisonville, Princeton	South end of KY 70/KY 91 concurrency
Kentucky	Caldwell	Fredonia	60.535	97.422	KY 902 east	South end of KY 902 concurrency
Kentucky	Caldwell	Fredonia	60.656	97.616	KY 902 west	North end of KY 902 concurrency
Kentucky	Crittenden		63.258	101.804	KY 70 west – Mexico	North end of KY 70 concurrency
Kentucky	Crittenden	Marion	69.577	111.973	US 60 / KY 91 north – Paducah, Henderson	Northern terminus; north end of KY 91 concurrency
1.000 mi = 1.609 km; 1.000 km = 0.621 mi: Concurrency terminus

== Special routes ==
Two special routes of U.S. Route 641 currently exist, and a third has existed in the past, all of which have been in Kentucky.

=== Murray business loop ===
U.S. Route 641 Business
- Location: Murray

US Route 641 Business is a business route of US Route 641 located mainly along the east side of Murray, Kentucky, in Calloway County. It follows Kentucky Route 121 east from US 641 along Glendale Road until KY 121 turns south along South Fourth Street, where US BUS 641 turns north. The route makes a sharp left turn at Chestnut Street and heads west before finally terminating at US 641.

=== Benton spur route ===
U.S. Route 641 Spur
- Location: Benton
- Length: 3.25 mi (5.23 km)

US Route 641 Spur is a spur route of US Route 641 located on the south side of Benton, Kentucky, in Marshall County in western Kentucky's Jackson Purchase region. It begins at a junction with US 641 south of Benton, and ends at the Exit 41 interchange with Interstate 69 (formerly the Julian M. Carroll Purchase Parkway).

=== Benton truck route ===
U.S. Route 641 Truck
- Location: Benton
- Existed: ?–1990s
