= Tennessee State Route 69 =

Highway in Tennessee

State Route 69
- SR 69; primary in red, secondary in blue, unsigned in green

Route information
- Maintained by TDOT
- Length: 151.77 mi (244.25 km)
- Existed: October 1, 1923–present

Major junctions
- South end: SR 20 at the Alabama state line near Florence, AL
- US 64 / SR 128 at Savannah; SR 22 at Milledgeville; US 641 at Bath Springs; SR 100 at Decaturville; US 412 at Parsons; I-40 at Holladay; US 70 near Camden; SR 218 near Paris (Paris Bypass); US 79 at Paris; SR 54 at Paris
- North end: KY 97 at the Kentucky state line near Puryear

Location
- Country: United States
- State: Tennessee
- Counties: Wayne, Hardin, McNairy, Decatur, Benton, Henry

Highway system
- Tennessee State Routes; Interstate; US; State
← SR 68	→ SR 69A

State Route 69 (SR 69) is a state highway in West and Middle Tennessee that runs parallel to the Tennessee River for the majority of its length. SR 69 carries both primary and secondary highway designations and is routed through rural areas.

== Route description ==
=== Wayne, Hardin and McNairy Counties ===
SR 69 begins in Wayne County at the Alabama border near Florence, AL, continuing as (AL) SR 20. It runs a short distance in Wayne County, with no major intersections, and crosses into Hardin County. It then goes through Walnut Grove and begins a northwest course. It then turns north and enters Maddox and intersects SR 226. It continues north through Walkertown and enters Savannah. In Savannah, it has a junction with SR 203. A short distance later, it intersects and becomes concurrent with SR 128/US 64/SR 15. After a couple of blocks, SR 128 separates and turns south. SR 69/US 64/SR 15 continue west, cross the Tennessee River, and exits Savannah. It continues to Crump, where SR 22 joins the concurrency. Shortly afterwards, SR 69 separates and turns north alone, and goes through Morris Chapel. It continues north and enters McNairy County and immediately comes to another junction and concurrency with SR 22 and they enter Milledegeville. In Milledgeville, it has a junction with SR 22A, one of only 3 alternate routes in the state. SR 69 then separates from SR 22 at the same intersection and turns east, returning to Hardin County. It enters the community of Lebanon and has a junction with SR 421. It continues east to intersect SR 104 before entering Saltillo. In Saltillo, SR 69 makes a sharp left turn and starts going north. Then it leaves Saltillo, starts running along the banks of the Tennessee River, and leaves Hardin County for the second and final time, crossing into Decatur County.

=== Decatur County ===
It then turns east again and junctions with SR 202. It then turns north again and becomes concurrent with SR 114 in Bath Springs, and continues north. Shortly afterwards, it comes to an intersection with US 641, where SR 114 turns south to be its unsigned companion route while SR 69 turns north to become concurrent with it and become its unsigned companion route. They then have another junction with SR 202 and it joins the concurrency. They then enter Decaturville and intersect SR 100. A short distance away, SR 202 separates and turns west, and US 641/SR 69 continues north leaving Decaturville. The highway then crosses the Beech River and enters Parsons to have an intersection with US 412/SR 20 in the center of town. They then leave Parsons and continue north to Holladay, where they have an interchange with I-40 and cross into Benton County.

=== Benton County ===
Further north, still in Holladay, US 641/SR 69 intersect SR 192, a loop through the center of Holladay and the former routing of US 641/SR 69. Continuing north, they junction with the other end of SR 192 and leave Holladay. They then enter Camden and have a junction with US 70/SR 1. They continue into Camden and intersect with US 70 Bus/SR 391, which leads to SR 69A (Old US 641/SR 69), one of only 3 alternate routes in the state, and downtown. They then exit Camden, with SR 69A paralleling them for a short ways, before diverting onto its own path. US 641/SR 69 then cross into Henry County.

=== Henry County ===
They then have a junction with SR 218 before entering Paris. Shortly afterwards, they intersect with the other end of SR 69A, and revert to their original routing. They then intersect with the northern terminus of SR 77, and continue into downtown, having a junction with US 79/SR 76 before having an intersection with SR 54 and SR 356. Here, US 641 continues north to Kentucky with SR 54 becoming its companion route, with SR 69 separating from US 641 and becoming signed again. It also turns west onto SR 54 for a short distance before turning north again. It has another junction with SR 218 before leaving Paris, alone. Continuing north, it then has an intersection and short concurrency with SR 140 in Cottage Grove. SR 69 then crosses into Kentucky south of Bell City and continues as KY 97.

The vast majority of this highway is two-lane with no access control. In Hardin County, there are two separate sections of this road due to the path of the Tennessee River through this area.

=== Points of interest ===
- Pickwick Landing State Park
- Paris Landing State Park
- Nathan Bedford Forrest State Park

== History ==
SR 192 and SR 69A both represent old alignments of SR 69 in Benton County. There are also numerous other unsigned historical sections that are named 'Old Highway 69' in Benton & Decatur county. These alignments generally run nearby the present day SR 69 and most feature narrow roadway width and extensive curves.

In 1977, US 641 was extended southward (from its original southern terminus at Paris) along the path of SR 69 to the interchange with I-40 (Exit 126) near Holladay with SR 69 continuing south beyond the interchange.

In November 2014, AASHTO approved a southern extension of the US 641 designation along SR 69, from the former southern terminus at I-40 to the current end at US 64 in Wayne County.

== Counties traversed ==
SR 69/SR 69A traverses the following counties shown in the table below.

Counties traversed by State Route 69
County	Length (mi)	Length (km)	Banner
Wayne	3.73	6.00	
Hardin (South)	33.03	53.16	
McNairy	0.46	0.74	
Hardin (North)	10.08	16.22	
Decatur	42.58	68.53	
Benton	24.23	38.99	
Benton	14.53	23.38	Alternate
Henry	31.42	50.57	
Henry	12.56	20.2	Alternate

== Major intersections ==
County	Location	mi	km	Destinations	Notes
Wayne		0.0	0.0	SR 20 east – Florence	Alabama state line; southern terminus; SR 69 begins as a primary highway
Hardin	Maddox			SR 226 (Airport Road) – Olivet	Provides access to Savannah-Hardin County Airport
Hardin	Savannah			US 64 Truck west (Water Street)	Southern end of US 64 Truck concurrency
Hardin	Savannah			SR 203 east (Pinhook Drive) – Olivet, Collinwood	Western terminus of SR 203
Hardin	Savannah			US 64 east / SR 128 north (Wayne Road/SR 15 east) – Clifton, Waynesboro	Eastern terminus of US 64 Truck; southern end of US 64/SR 15 concurrency; southern end of SR 128 wrong-way concurrency
Hardin	Savannah			SR 128 south (Pickwick Street) – Walkertown, Pickwick Dam	Northern end of SR 128 wrong-way concurrency; Pickwick Landing Dam and Pickwick Landing State Park
Hardin	Savannah			US 64 Truck east (Water Street)	Western terminus of US 64 Truck
Hardin	Savannah			Harrison-McGarity Carpenter Bridge over the Tennessee River	
Hardin	Crump			SR 22 south – Michie	Southern end of SR 22 concurrency; provides access to Shiloh National Military Park
Hardin	Crump			US 64 west / SR 22 north (David Crockett Highway/SR 15 west) – Adamsville	Northern end of US 64/SR 15/SR 22 concurrency; SR 69 turns secondary
McNairy				SR 22 south – Adamsville	Southern end of SR 22 concurrency
McNairy	Milledgeville			SR 22 north (Broad Street) / SR 22A north (Main Street) – Lexington, Enville	Southern terminus of SR 22A; northern end of SR 22 concurrency
Hardin	Lebanon			SR 421 north – Sardis	Southern terminus of SR 421
Hardin	Saltillo			SR 104 west – Sardis	Eastern terminus of SR 104
Decatur				SR 202 north (Brooksie Thompson Road) – Decaturville	Southern terminus of SR 202
Decatur	Bath Springs			SR 114 north – Scotts Hill	Southern end of SR 114 wrong-way concurrency
Decatur	Bath Springs			US 641 south (SR 114 south) – Clifton	Northern end of SR 114 wrong-way concurrency; southern end of US 641 concurrency; SR 69 turns primary and becomes unsigned
Decatur				SR 202 south (Brooksie Thompson Road)	Southern end of SR 202 concurrency
Decatur	Decaturville			SR 100 (W Main Street) – Henderson, Scotts Hill, Linden	
Decatur	Decaturville			SR 202 north (Middleburg Road) – Beacon	Northern end of SR 202 concurrency
Decatur				Arthur F. Tolley Bridge over the Beech River	
Decatur	Parsons			US 412 (Main Street/SR 20) – Lexington, Chesterfield, Linden, Hohenwald	
Decatur	Holladay			I-40 – Memphis, Nashville	I-40 exit 126; former southern terminus of US 641 until November 2014
Benton	Holladay			SR 192 north – Downtown	Southern terminus of SR 192; Old US 641/SR 69 through Holladay
Benton				SR 192 south – Holladay	Northern terminus of SR 192; Old US 641/SR 69 through Holladay
Benton				US 70 (SR 1) – Huntingdon, Bruceton, New Johnsonville, Waverly	
Benton	Camden			US 70 Bus. (Highway 70 W/W Main Street/SR 391) to SR 69A	Old US 70/SR 1 through downtown; provides access to Nathan Bedford Forrest State Park
Henry	Paris			SR 218 – McKenzie, Paris Landing	2-lane beltway around Paris
Henry	Paris			SR 69A south (Memorial Drive) – Big Sandy	Northern terminus of SR 69A; former routing of SR 69
Henry	Paris			SR 77 west (Mineral Wells Avenue) – Huntingdon	Eastern terminus of SR 77
Henry	Paris			US 79 (Tyson Avenue/SR 76) – McKenzie, Henry, Dover	Provides access to Paris Landing State Park and Land Between the Lakes National Recreation Area
Henry	Paris			US 641 north (Market Street/SR 54 east) / SR 356 east (E Wood Street) to US 79 – Puryear	Southern end of SR 54 concurrency; northern end of US 641 concurrency; western terminus of SR 356; SR 69 turns secondary and becomes signed
Henry	Paris			SR 54 east (W Wood Street) – Dresden	Northern end of SR 54 concurrency
Henry				SR 218 (Highway 218 Bypass)	Paris Bypass; 2-lane beltway around Paris
Henry	Cottage Grove			SR 140 west – Downtown, Como	Southern end of SR 140 concurrency
Henry				SR 140 east (Puryear Road) – Puryear	Northern end of SR 140 concurrency
Henry	Midway (north)	151.77	244.25	KY 97 north – Mayfield	Kentucky state line; northern terminus; SR 69 ends as a secondary highway
1.000 mi = 1.609 km; 1.000 km = 0.621 mi: Concurrency terminus

== Alternate route ==
State Route 69A
- Location: Camden-Big Sandy-Paris, Tennessee

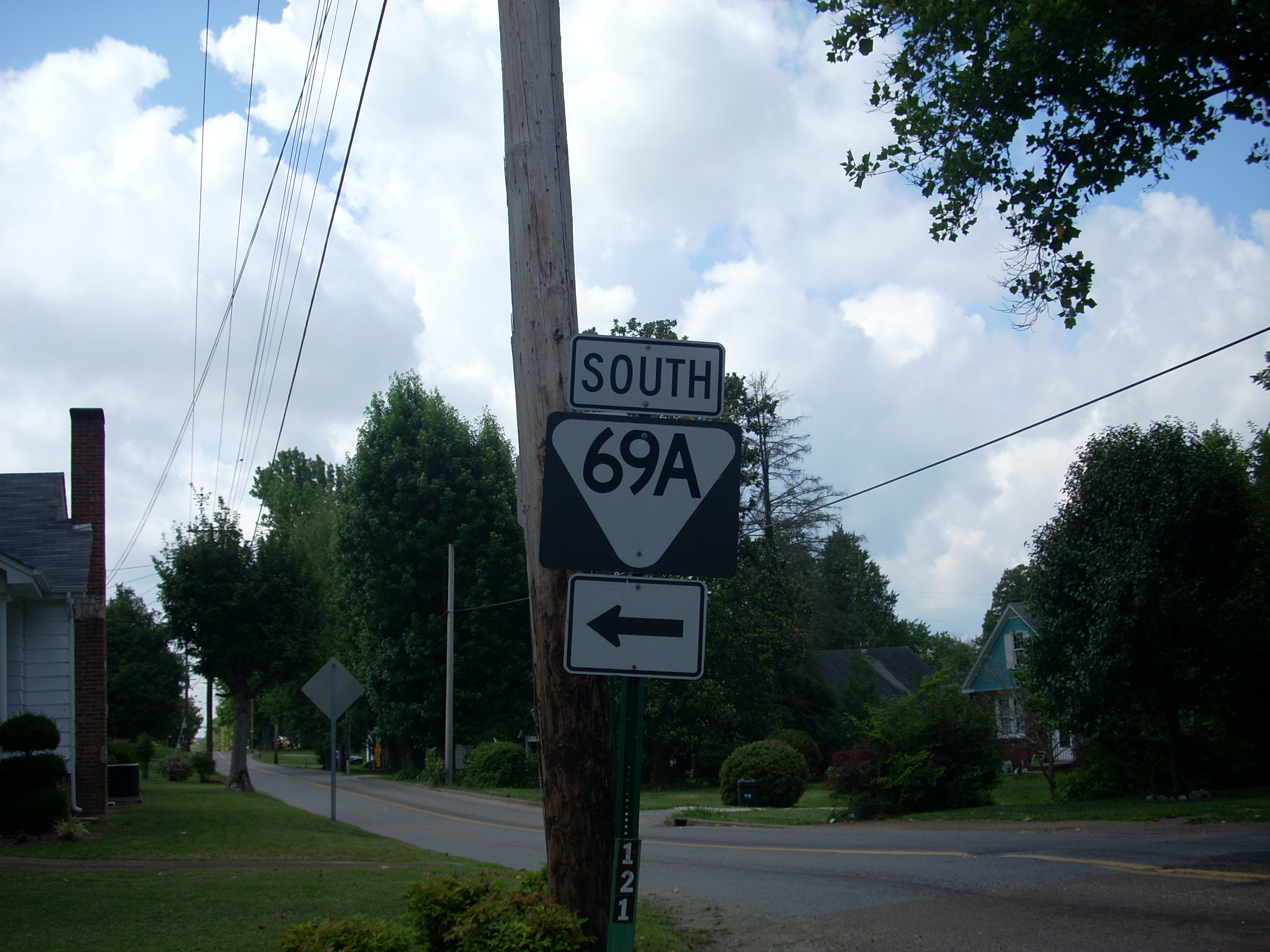
State Route 69A reassurance shield north of Camden, TN.

SR 69 is one of only three state highways in Tennessee that have a signed alternate route. SR 69A is approximately 27.09 miles (43.60 km) long with a northern terminus of Paris and a southern terminus of Camden. It serves the town of Big Sandy and provides access to rural northern Benton County and southeastern Henry County. SR 69A is a narrow and very curvy two-lane highway throughout its entire length, except for a short portion in Paris where SR 69A is a five-lane road with four-lanes and one center turn. SR 69A is known as 'Old Highway 69' in Benton County and a few old mileposts still exist indicating '69' on the bottom of the sign, as opposed to newer mileposts which indicate '69A'.
