= Tennessee State Route 100 =

State highway in Tennessee, United States

State Route 100
- SR 100 highlighted; primary in red, secondary in blue

Route information
- Maintained by TDOT
- Length: 158.31 mi (254.78 km)

Major junctions
- West end: US 64 / US 64 Bus. in Whiteville
- SR 18 near Toone; US 45 in Henderson; SR 22 near Reagan; US 641 in Decaturville; US 412 in Perryville; I-840 near Bon Aqua; Natchez Trace Parkway in Pasquo
- East end: US 70S in Nashville

Location
- Country: United States
- State: Tennessee
- Counties: Hardeman, Chester, Henderson, Decatur, Perry, Hickman, Williamson, Davidson

Highway system
- Tennessee State Routes; Interstate; US; State
← SR 99	→ SR 101

State Route 100 (SR 100) is a west–east state highway in both West Tennessee and Middle Tennessee that connects Whiteville with Nashville. It is 158.31 mi (254.8 km) long.

== Route description ==
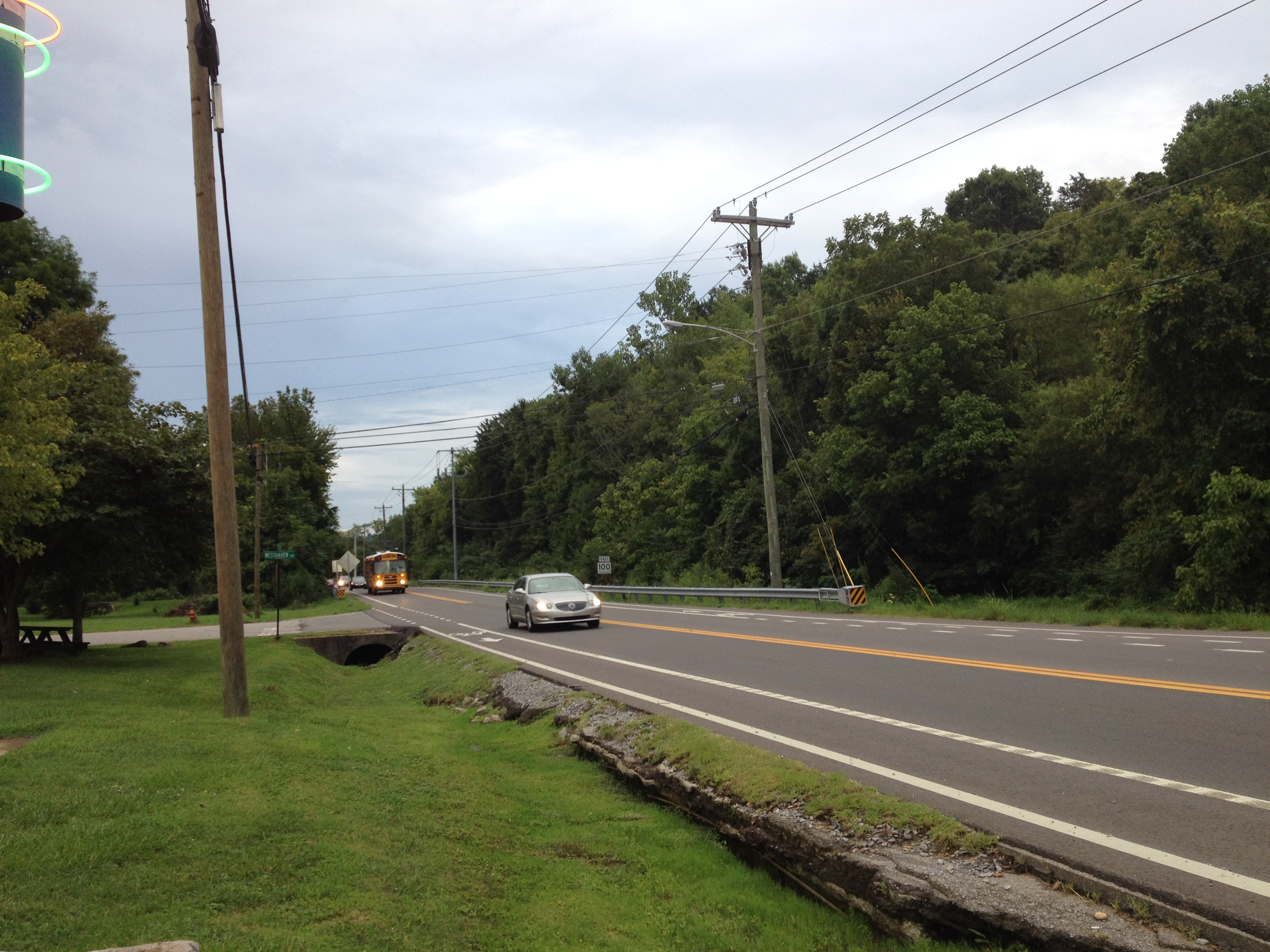
SR 100 eastbound past the interchange with the northern terminus of the Natchez Trace Parkway in Pasquo

=== Hardeman County ===
SR 100 begins as a primary highway in West Tennessee in Hardeman County at an intersection with US 64/SR 15 in Whiteville. Then SR 100 leaves Whiteville heading east but slightly northward before crossing the Hatchie River. SR 100 then has an intersection with SR 138 just north of Toone. Shortly afterwards, it has an interchange with SR 18 and shortly thereafter enters Chester County.

=== Chester County ===
SR 100 has an intersection with SR 125 before entering a hilly area of western Tennessee and passing Chickasaw State Park before intersecting SR 225 and entering Henderson. It then bypasses downtown to the south and has an interchange with US 45/SR 5. SR 100 then leaves Henderson and crosses over the South Fork of the Forked Deer River within a few miles of its inception. It then continues on to Jacks Creek, where it has an intersection with SR 22A, before crossing into Henderson County.

=== Henderson County ===
SR 100 continues northeast to intersect SR 22 before having an intersection with SR 104 in Reagan passing through Scotts Hill and having an intersection with SR 114. Scotts Hill is in Henderson County as well as Decatur County.

=== Decatur County ===
Once in Decatur County, SR 100 enters Decaturville and intersects with US 641/SR 69/SR 202, where it becomes a secondary highway, before passing through downtown. The highway then leaves Decaturville and continues northeast to Perryville, where it crosses a bridge over the Beech River before coming to an intersection and becomes concurrent with US 412/SR 20. The highway then crosses the Tennessee River on the Alvin C. York Bridge into Middle Tennessee and Perry County.

=== Perry County ===
They then have an intersection with SR 438 before continuing east to Linden, where they pass through downtown before intersecting SR 13. US 412/SR 20/SR 100 then leaves Linden and passes through Chestnut Grove until a Y-Intersection in which SR 100 splits off from US 412/SR 20 and continues northeast, becoming a primary highway and crossing into Hickman County.

=== Hickman County ===
SR 100 continues northeast through rural areas before becoming concurrent with SR 48 before entering Centerville, where they have a short concurrency with SR 50 before passing through downtown and crossing the Duck River. SR 48 then splits off from SR 100 at an intersection with SR 230, which becomes concurrent with SR 100 at this intersection. They then leave Centerville and continue northeast to an intersection where SR 230 splits off and goes southeast, before SR 100 passes through the communities of Wrigley, Lyles, Bon Aqua Junction, and Bon Aqua, where it has an intersection with SR 7 and becomes concurrent with SR 46 shortly before crossing into Williamson County.

=== Williamson County ===
SR 46 immediately splits off from SR 100 just feet from SR 100's interchange with I-840 (Exit 7). SR 100 then continues northeast to Fairview where it has an interchange with and becomes concurrent with SR 96, before leaving Fairview and entering the Highland Rim, crossing into Davidson County.

=== Davidson County ===
SR 96 then splits off and goes southeast while SR 100 passes through hilly terrain before passing through Pasquo, where it has an interchange with the Natchez Trace Parkway at the Parkway's northern terminus. SR 100 then enters Belle Meade, where it passes through several neighborhoods and has an intersection with SR 254 (Old Hickory Boulevard). SR 100 then passes northwest of Percy Warner Park before coming to an end at US 70S/SR 1.

== History ==
Prior to construction of Interstate 40, SR 100 (in conjunction US 64 between Bartlett and Whiteville) was a customarily traveled route between Memphis and Nashville but today serves primarily local traffic.

== Major intersections ==
County	Location	mi	km	Destinations	Notes
Hardeman	Whiteville	0.0	0.0	US 64 west (SR 15) / US 64 Bus. east (West Main Street) – Bolivar, Downtown Whiteville	Western terminus of SR 100; SR 100 begins unsigned; Western end of US 64 concurrency
Hardeman	Whiteville			SR 179 west (South Cross Street) – Whiteville	Eastern terminus of SR 179
Hardeman	Whiteville			US 64 Bus. west (East Main Street) – Whiteville	Eastern terminus of US 64 Business
Hardeman	Whiteville			US 64 east (SR 15) – Somerville	SR 100 becomes signed as a primary highway; Eastern end of US 64 concurrency
Hardeman	Toone			SR 138 north (Main Street) – Mercer	Western end of SR 138 concurrency
Hardeman	Toone			SR 138 south (Main Street) – Toone	Eastern end of SR 138 concurrency
Hardeman				SR 18 to I-40 – Bolivar, Jackson	interchange
Chester				SR 125 south – Silerton	Northern terminus of SR 125
Chester				SR 225 south – Montezuma	Northern terminus of SR 225
Chester	Henderson			US 45 (SR 5) – Jackson, Selmer	interchange
Chester	Jacks Creek			SR 22A – Lexington, Enville, Milledgeville	
Henderson				SR 22 – Lexington, Adamsville, Shiloh Park, Pickwick Park	
Henderson	Reagan			SR 104 – Lexington, Sardis	
Henderson	Scotts Hill			SR 114 (SR 201) – Clifton, Chesterfield, Sardis	SR 201 is unsigned
Decatur	Decaturville			US 641 (SR 69/SR 202) to I-40 – Parsons, Clifton	SR 100 turns secondary
Decatur	Perryville			US 412 west (SR 20) – Parsons	West end of US 412 / SR 20 overlap
Tennessee River				Alvin C. York Bridge	
Perry	Howard			SR 438 east – Mousetail Landing State Park	Western terminus of SR 438
Perry	Linden			SR 13 (Squirrel Hollow Drive) – Lobelville, Waynesboro	Provides access to James Tucker Airport
Perry				US 412 east (SR 20) – Hohenwald	East end of US 412 / SR 20 overlap; SR 100 turns primary
Hickman				SR 48 south – Hohenwald, Waynesboro	West end of SR 48 overlap
Hickman	Centerville			SR 50 east – Columbia	West end of SR 50 overlap
Hickman	Centerville			SR 50 west to I-40 – Lobelville	East end of SR 50 overlap
Hickman	Centerville			SR 48 north / SR 230 west to I-40 – Nunnelly	East end of SR 48 overlap; west end of SR 230 overlap
Hickman				SR 230 east (Littlelot Road) – Littlelot	East end of SR 230 overlap
Hickman	Bon Aqua			SR 7 south / SR 46 north to I-40 – Dickson, Columbia	Northern terminus of SR 7; western end of SR 46 overlap
Williamson				SR 46 east (Pinewood Road) – Leipers Fork	Eastern end of SR 46 overlap
Williamson				I-840 – Dickson, Franklin	Exit 7 on I-840; former SR 840
Williamson	Fairview			SR 96 west to I-40 – Dickson, Montgomery Bell	Interchange; west end of SR 96 overlap
Davidson				SR 96 east – Franklin	East end of SR 96 overlap
Davidson	Pasquo			Natchez Trace Parkway south	Northern terminus of Natchez Trace Parkway
Davidson	Bellevue			To I-40 / Old Hickory Boulevard	to SR 251
Davidson	Bellevue			SR 254 east (Old Hickory Boulevard) – Forest Hills, Brentwood	Western terminus of SR 254
Davidson	Nashville	158.31	254.78	US 70S (Harding Pike / SR 1) – Bellevue, Nashville	Eastern terminus of SR 100; SR 100 ends as a primary highway
1.000 mi = 1.609 km; 1.000 km = 0.621 mi: Concurrency terminus
