= Tennessee State Route 114 =

State highway in Tennessee, United States

State Route 114
- SR 114 highlighted in red

Route information
- Maintained by TDOT
- Length: 96.49 mi (155.29 km)

Major junctions
- South end: US 64 at Clifton Junction
- US 641 / SR 69 in Bath Springs; SR 100 near Scotts Hill; US 412 from Chesterfield to Lexington; I-40 inside the Natchez Trace State Park; US 70 at Hollow Rock
- North end: SR 77 south of Paris

Location
- Country: United States
- State: Tennessee
- Counties: Wayne, Hardin, Decatur, Henderson, Carroll, Henry

Highway system
- Tennessee State Routes; Interstate; US; State
← SR 113	→ SR 115

State Route 114 (SR 114) is a north–south state highway that traverses six counties in the western grand division of Tennessee. The 96.49-mile-long (155.29 km) route travels from Clifton Junction to an area south of Paris via Scotts Hill, Lexington, and the Natchez Trace State Park.

Most of SR 114 is a secondary route, but a portion of the route between Clifton and Bath Springs is a primary route.

== Route description ==
=== Wayne and Hardin Counties ===
SR 114 begins at Clifton Junction in western Wayne County, at an intersection with US 64 (SR 15). It goes north as an improved 2-lane highway and runs concurrently with US 641 as a secret, or hidden, designation. They pass through Clifton, where they have a short concurrency with SR 128, where it enters Hardin County, just before crossing a bridge over the Tennessee River before crossing into Decatur County.

=== Decatur County ===
SR 114 then follows a northwesterly path as it becomes signed at an intersection with SR 69 near Bath Springs, where it splits from US 641 and becomes concurrent with SR 69. They pass through Bath Springs before they split, with SR 114 continuing northwest. SR 114 has an intersection with SR 202 and passes through Lick Skillet before entering Scotts Hill and crossing into Henderson County.

=== Henderson County ===
SR 114 becomes concurrent with SR 201 in downtown before having an intersection with SR 100. They then leave Scott's Hill, where SR 201 splits off from SR 114 just to the north of town. The highway then enters Chesterfield, where it turns west to run concurrently with US 412 (SR 20) to Lexington as a 4-lane highway. They enter downtown Lexington and come to an intersection with SR 104, where SR 114 departs from US 412 (SR 20) as a 2-lane and continues northward to Natchez Trace State Park, where it crosses I-40 (Exit 116) and enters Carroll County.

=== Carroll and Henry Counties ===
SR 114 continues through mainly rural areas, passing through the communities of Yuma, where it has an intersection with SR 424, Westport, and Burna Vista before entering the town of Hollow Rock, where it has a short concurrency with US 70 (SR 1). It crosses the Big Sandy River between Westport and Buena Vista. SR 114 then crosses into Henry County and passes through Mansfield before reaching its northern terminus at the SR 77 junction just south of Paris.

== History ==
Until US 641 was extended into Decatur, northeast Hardin and northwest Wayne counties in 2015, SR 114 was signed in its course from US 64 to SR 69. US 641's original southern terminus was at the I-40 junction at the Decatur–Benton county line.

== Major intersections ==
County	Location	mi	km	Destinations	Notes
Wayne	Clifton Junction	0.00	0.00	US 64 (Savannah Highway/SR 15) – Savannah, Waynesboro	Southern terminus; southern end of unsigned US 641 concurrency; SR 114 begins as an unsigned primary highway
Wayne	Clifton			SR 128 east (W Pillow Street) – Downtown Clifton, Linden	Southern end of SR 128 concurrency
Hardin				SR 128 south (New Highway 128) – Savannah	Northern end of SR 128 concurrency
Decatur	Bath Springs			US 641 north (SR 69 north) – Decaturville, Parsons	Northern end of unsigned US 641 concurrency; southern end of wrong-way SR 69 concurrency; SR 114 becomes a signed secondary highway
Decatur	Bath Springs			SR 69 south – Saltillo	Northern end of wrong-way SR 69 concurrency
Decatur				SR 202 (Brooksie Thompson Road)	
Henderson	Scotts Hill			SR 201 south (Sardis-Scotts Hill Road) – Sardis	Southern end of unsigned SR 201 concurrency
Henderson	Scotts Hill			SR 100 – Henderson, Decaturville	
Henderson				SR 201 north (Middleburg Decaturville Road) – Decaturville	Northern end of unsigned SR 201 concurrency
Henderson	Chesterfield			US 412 east (SR 20 east) – Darden, Parsons	Southern end of US 412/SR 20 concurrency; provides access to Beech River Regional Airport
Henderson	Lexington			US 412 west (Church Street/SR 20 west) / SR 104 (Natchez Trace Drive) – Jackson	Northern end of US 412/SR 20 concurrency
Henderson–Carroll county line	Natchez Trace State Park			I-40 – Nashville, Memphis	I-40 Exit 116
Carroll	Yuma			SR 424 west – Clarksburg	Eastern terminus of SR 424
Carroll	Hollow Rock			US 70 west (Broad Street/SR 1 west) – Huntingdon	Southern end of short 560 ft. US 70/SR 1 concurrency
Carroll	Hollow Rock			US 70 east (Broad Street/SR 1 east) – Bruceton, Camden	Northern end of short 560 ft. US 70/SR 1 concurrency
Henry		96.49	155.29	SR 77 (Browning Drive) – Paris, Huntingdon	Northern terminus; SR 114 ends as a signed secondary highway
1.000 mi = 1.609 km; 1.000 km = 0.621 mi: Concurrency terminus

== See also ==
- List of highways numbered 114
