= Tennessee State Route 201 =

State highway

State Route 201
- SR 201 highlighted in red

Route information
- Maintained by TDOT
- Length: 23.0 mi (37.0 km)
- Existed: July 1, 1983–present

Major junctions
- South end: SR 22 near Sardis
- SR 104 / SR 421 in Sardis; SR 100 / SR 114 in Scotts Hill
- North end: SR 202 near Decaturville

Location
- Country: United States
- State: Tennessee
- Counties: Chester, Henderson, Decatur

Highway system
- Tennessee State Routes; Interstate; US; State
← SR 200	→ SR 202

State Route 201 (SR 201) is a 23.0 mile long north-south state highway in West Tennessee.

== Route description ==
SR 201 begins in Chester County at an intersection with SR 22. It heads southeast through wooded areas to cross into Henderson County and pass through farmland for several miles to enter Sardis, where it has an intersection with SR 421 and has a short concurrency with SR 104. The highway then leaves Sardis and winds its way northeast through a mix of farmland and wooded areas to enter Scotts Hill and come to an intersection with SR 114 in downtown. SR 201 now turns northwest, concurrent with SR 114, to pass through a business district and have an intersection with SR 100. SR 114/SR 201 then leave Scotts Hill and wind their way north through a mix of farmland and wooded areas for several miles before SR 201 splits off goes east. Throughout the entire concurrency with SR 114, SR 201 is unsigned. SR 201 continues east through rural areas before crossing into Decatur County and coming to an end shortly thereafter at an intersection with SR 202, just northwest of Decaturville. The entire route of SR 201 is a two-lane highway.

== Major intersections ==
County	Location	mi	km	Destinations	Notes
Chester		0.0	0.0	SR 22 – Milledgeville, Lexington	Southern terminus
Henderson	Sardis			SR 104 east – Saltillo SR 421 south (Hinkle Road) – Lebanon	Southern end of SR 104 concurrency; northern terminus of SR 421
Henderson	Sardis			SR 104 west – Lexington	Northern end of SR 104 concurrency
Henderson	Scotts Hill			SR 114 south – Saltillo	Southern end of SR 114 concurrency; SR 201 becomes unsigned
Henderson	Scotts Hill			SR 100 – Henderson, Decaturville	
Henderson				SR 114 north – Chesterfield, Lexington	Northern end of SR 114 concurrency; SR 201 becomes signed
Decatur		23.0	37.0	SR 202 (Beacon Road/Middleburg Road) – Beacon, Decaturville	Northern terminus
1.000 mi = 1.609 km; 1.000 km = 0.621 mi: Concurrency terminus
