= Dunbar, Tennessee =

- Unincorporated community
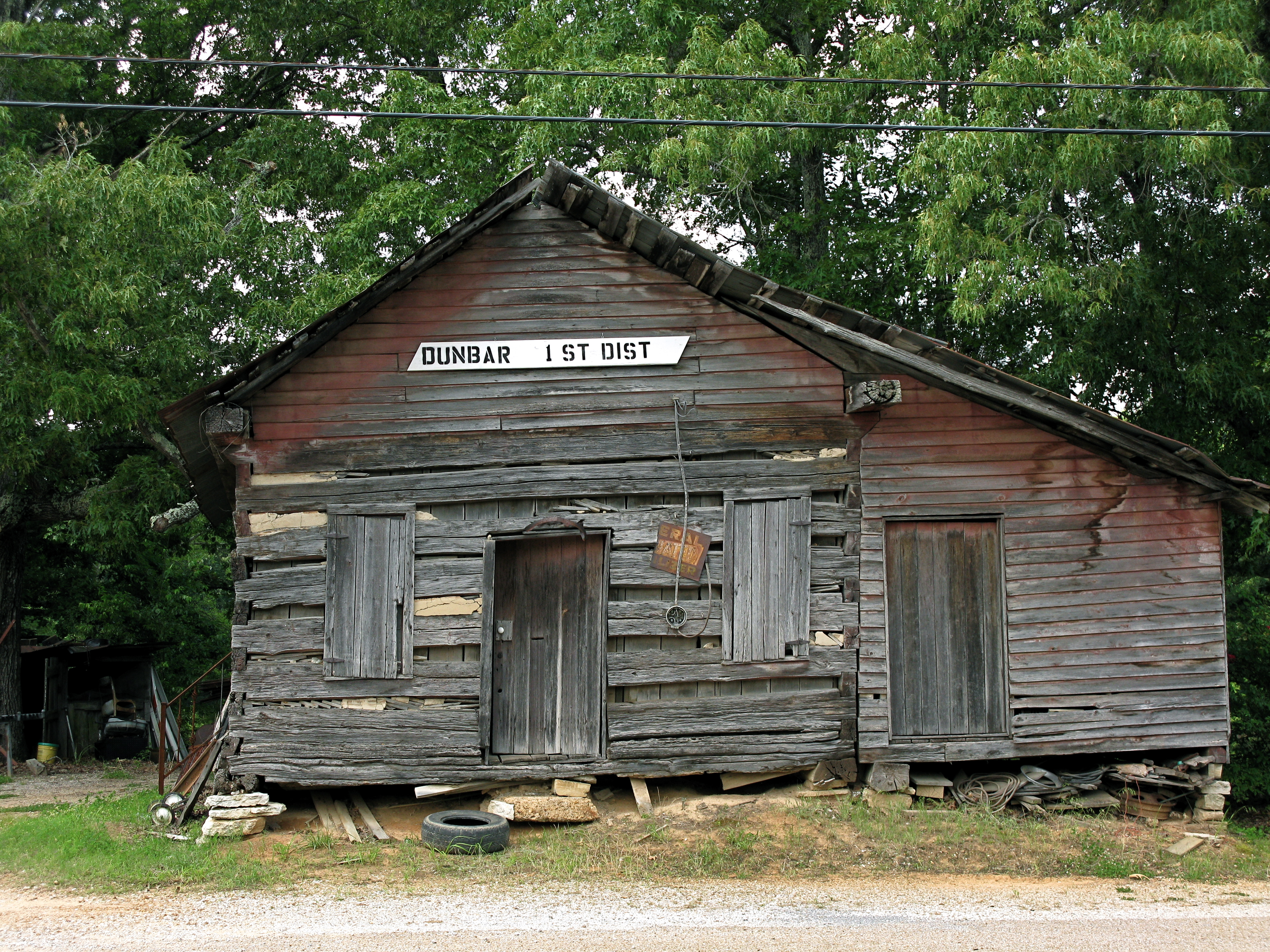
- Derelict building in Dunbar

- Location within Tennessee Location within the United States
- Coordinates: 35°27′32″N 88°08′40″W
- Country: United States
- State: Tennessee
- County: Decatur
- Elevation: 541 ft (165 m)
- Time zone: UTC-6 (Central (CST))
  - Summer (DST): UTC-5 (CDT)
- Area code: 731
- GNIS feature ID: 1314982

Dunbar is an unincorporated community in Decatur County, Tennessee, United States. The community is at the intersection of Tennessee State Route 114 and Tennessee State Route 202 8.7 miles (14.0 km) south of Decaturville.
