= WKJQ =

WKJQ may refer to:

- WKJQ (AM), a defunct radio station (1550 AM) formerly licensed to serve Parsons, Tennessee, United States
- WKJQ-FM, a radio station (97.3 FM) licensed to serve Parsons, Tennessee
