= Decatur, Tennessee (disambiguation) =

Decatur is a city in East Tennessee. In reference to places in Tennessee, "Decatur" may also refer to:

- Decatur County, Tennessee
- Decaturville, Tennessee
