= WKJQ (AM) =

- Parsons, Tennessee; United States
- Frequency: 1550 kHz

Programming
- Format: Religious

Ownership
- Owner: Clenney Broadcasting Corporation
- Sister stations: WKJQ-FM

History
- First air date: 1970
- Last air date: July 2, 2012
- Former call signs: WTBP (1970–1990)

Technical information
- Facility ID: 67457
- Class: D
- Power: 1,000 watts (day only)
- Transmitter coordinates: 35°39′26″N 88°9′7″W

WKJQ (1550 AM) was a daytime-only radio station broadcasting a religious format. Formerly licensed to Parsons, Tennessee, United States, the station was owned by Clenney Broadcasting Corporation.

WKJQ went silent on July 2, 2012. On September 13, 2012, Clenney Broadcasting surrendered the station's license to the Federal Communications Commission (FCC). The FCC cancelled the station's license and deleted the WKJQ call sign from their database.
