= Lick Skillet, Tennessee =

- Unincorporated community
- Location within Tennessee Location within the United States
- Coordinates: 35°29′26″N 88°12′21″W
- Country: United States
- State: Tennessee
- County: Decatur
- Elevation: 528 ft (161 m)
- Time zone: UTC-6 (Central (CST))
  - Summer (DST): UTC-5 (CDT)
- Area code: 731
- GNIS feature ID: 1291245

Lick Skillet is an unincorporated community in Decatur County, Tennessee, United States. Lick Skillet is located on Tennessee State Route 114 southeast of Scotts Hill.
