= Buffalo Ridge Refuge =

Protected area in Tennessee, United States

- IUCN category V (protected landscape/seascape)
- Location within Tennessee
- Location: Humphreys County, Tennessee
- Nearest city: Lobelville, Tennessee
- Coordinates: 35°51′23″N 87°49′21″W
- Area: 7.34 km^{2} (1,810 acres)
- Established: August 26, 2016
- Governing body: Tennessee Wildlife Resources Agency
- Website: Buffalo Ridge Refuge

Buffalo Ridge Refuge is a wildlife management area operated by the Tennessee Wildlife Resources Agency in Humphreys County, Tennessee. The refuge also hosts outreach programs and managed hunts. It was established by proclamation of the Tennessee Wildlife Resources Commission on August 26, 2016.

== See also ==
- Tennessee National Wildlife Refuge
