= Bible Hill, Tennessee =

- Unincorporated community
- Location within Tennessee Location within the United States
- Coordinates: 35°42′11″N 88°08′38″W
- Country: United States
- State: Tennessee
- County: Decatur
- Elevation: 459 ft (140 m)
- Time zone: UTC-6 (Central (CST))
  - Summer (DST): UTC-5 (CDT)
- Area code: 731
- GNIS feature ID: 1305195

Bible Hill is an unincorporated community in Decatur County, Tennessee, United States. Bible Hill is located north of Parsons.
