= Tennessee State Route 192 =

State highway in Tennessee, United States

State Route 192
- SR 192 highlighted in red

Route information
- Maintained by TDOT
- Length: 10.8 mi (17.4 km)
- Existed: July 1, 1983–present

Major junctions
- South end: US 641 near Holladay
- North end: US 641 south of Camden

Location
- Country: United States
- State: Tennessee
- Counties: Benton

Highway system
- Tennessee State Routes; Interstate; US; State
← SR 191	→ SR 193

State Route 192 (SR 192) is a secondary state highway that runs through Benton County in western Tennessee in the United States. The route serves as a loop to the west of U.S. Route 641 (US 641) in the southern part of the county, serving the community of Holladay. SR 192 is a two-lane undivided road its entire length, passing through rural areas.

== Route description ==
SR 192 begins at an intersection with US 641 (SR 69) in southern Benton County, heading northwest as a two-lane undivided road that is a secondary state route. The road passes through wooded areas with some fields and homes before curving west and running through dense forest. The route turns to the northwest before it curves southwest and heads north of a quarry. SR 192 runs through more woodland before bending to the west and running through farm fields. The route enters the community of Holladay and passes through residential areas, turning to the north. The road heads past more homes and the post office before it leaves Holladay and runs through farmland with some trees and residences, crossing Birdsong Creek. SR 192 curves north-northeast and runs through forested areas with some fields and homes, crossing Turkey Creek. Farther along, the road continues north and winds through more rural land, heading across Ammon Creek. SR 192 comes to its northern terminus at an intersection with US 641 (SR 69) to the south of Camden.

== History ==
The entire route of SR 192 is a former alignment of US 641/SR 69 (then signed as SR 69).

== Junction list ==
The entire route is in Benton County.

Location	mi	km	Destinations	Notes
Holladay	0.0	0.0	US 641 (SR 69) to I-40 – Parsons, Camden	Southern terminus
	10.8	17.4	US 641 (SR 69) – Camden, Parsons	Northern terminus
1.000 mi = 1.609 km; 1.000 km = 0.621 mi
