= Sugar Tree, Tennessee =

- Unincorporated community
- Location within Tennessee Location within the United States
- Coordinates: 35°49′45″N 88°02′10″W
- Country: United States
- State: Tennessee
- County: Decatur
- Elevation: 417 ft (127 m)
- Time zone: UTC-6 (Central (CST))
  - Summer (DST): UTC-5 (CDT)
- ZIP code: 38380
- Area code: 731
- GNIS feature ID: 1303902

Sugar Tree is an unincorporated community in Decatur County, Tennessee, United States. The zipcode is: 38380.
