= Holladay, Tennessee =

Holladay
- Unincorporated community and CDP
- Location within Tennessee Location within the United States
- Coordinates: 35°52′14″N 88°08′45″W
- Country: United States
- State: Tennessee
- Counties: Benton and Decatur

Area
  - Total: 1.48 sq mi (3.83 km^{2})
  - Land: 1.48 sq mi (3.83 km^{2})
  - Water: 0 sq mi (0.00 km^{2})
- Elevation: 472 ft (144 m)

Population (2020)
  - Total: 95
  - Density: 64.3/sq mi (24.82/km^{2})
- Time zone: UTC-6 (Central (CST))
  - Summer (DST): UTC-5 (CDT)
- ZIP code: 38341
- Area code: 731
- GNIS feature ID: 1288045

Holladay is an unincorporated community and census-designated place in Benton and Decatur counties in the U.S. state of Tennessee. Holladay is located along Tennessee State Route 192 13.3 miles (21.4 km) south-southwest of Camden. Another portion of the community is located at the intersection of I-40 and US 641/SR 69. Holladay has a post office with ZIP code 38341, which opened on February 23, 1887.

Historical population
| Census | Pop. | Note | %± |
|---|---|---|---|
| 2020 | 95 | | — |
U.S. Decennial Census
