= Midway (north), Henry County, Tennessee =

Midway
- Unincorporated community
- Location within Tennessee Location within the United States
- Coordinates: 36°29′16″N 88°29′53″W
- Country: United States
- State: Tennessee
- County: Henry
- Elevation: 440 ft (130 m)
- Time zone: UTC-6 (Central (CST))
  - Summer (DST): UTC-5 (CDT)
- Area code: 731
- GNIS feature ID: 1293727

Midway is an unincorporated community in Henry County, Tennessee. Midway is located on Tennessee State Route 69 in the northwest corner of Henry County, 16 miles (26 km) northwest of Paris.
