= Beech River =

River in Tennessee, United States

Coordinates: 35.616736°N 88.037810°W

The Beech River is a 38.3-mile-long (61.6 km) stream draining the east-central portion of West Tennessee in the United States. The Beech rises about 5 miles (8 km) northwest of Lexington, Tennessee. In the same area are the headwaters of two other West Tennessee rivers, the Big Sandy River and the Middle Fork of the Forked Deer River. The Big Sandy, like the Beech, is part of the Tennessee River system, whereas the Forked Deer system drains into the Mississippi River.

The Beech River was named for the beech timber along its course.

== Hydrography ==
The Beech flows southeast into the town of Lexington and then primarily eastward. As is typical of most major streams in West Tennessee, much of the lower course was the subject of a channelization project in the mid-20th century conducted largely for agricultural purposes; this has resulted in a considerable loss of wetland. The stream crosses into Decatur County, flowing in between Parsons and Decaturville. The large embayment formed at the mouth of the Beech is the result of the backwaters of the Kentucky Dam project many miles downstream on the Tennessee; the embayment reaches the outskirts of both towns.

== Dams ==
The Beech River system is somewhat unusual in that it and all of its major tributaries (a total of eight) are impounded, one of them twice, primarily by dams built in the mid 20th century as part of the Tennessee Valley Authority's Beech River Project—Beech, Cedar, Dogwood, Lost Creek (which has no permanent reservoir), Pin Oak, Pine, Redbud, and Sycamore. The dams are purely for purposes of flood control and recreation, though it is possible that the relatively small volume of water they store could result in some minimal aid to navigation on the Tennessee under some conditions. Unlike most other TVA dams, none of the Beech River dams are used for hydropower, since the small size of the streams impounded and their relative lack of fall would make power generation impractical. Some of the lakes created are located in Natchez Trace State Park, the largest of the Tennessee state parks; though located many miles west of both the Natchez Trace Parkway and the historic Natchez Trace, this area is named for a branch of the historic Trace that bore that name in the area.

== See also ==
- List of rivers of Tennessee
