= WKJQ-FM =

- Parsons, Tennessee; United States
- Frequency: 97.3 MHz
- Branding: Q97.3 FM

Programming
- Format: Country

Ownership
- Owner: Clenney Broadcasting Corporation

History
- First air date: 1990

Technical information
- Licensing authority: FCC
- Facility ID: 12001
- Class: A
- ERP: 6,000 watts
- HAAT: 78.0 meters (255.9 ft)
- Transmitter coordinates: 35°39′39″N 88°7′5″W

Links
- Public license information: Public file; LMS
- Website: q973fm.com

WKJQ-FM (97.3 FM, "Q97.3 FM") is a radio station broadcasting a country music format. Licensed to Parsons, Tennessee, United States, the station is currently owned by Clenney Broadcasting Corporation.
