= Clifton Junction, Tennessee =

- Unincorporated community
- Location within Tennessee
- Coordinates: 35°18′31″N 87°56′56″W
- Country: United States
- State: Tennessee
- County: Wayne
- Elevation: 456 ft (139 m)
- Time zone: Central (CST)
  - Summer (DST): CDT
- Area code: 931
- GNIS feature ID: 1314857

Clifton Junction is an unincorporated community located in Wayne County, Tennessee, United States. The community is located at the junction of U.S. Route 641 and U.S. Route 64. The music video for Mark Collie's song Hardin County Line was filmed in this area. Clifton Junction is located a few miles south of the city of Clifton.

== Nearby Cities and Communities ==
- Clifton
- Olive Hill
- Waynesboro
- Houston
