= Tennessee National Wildlife Refuge =

- IUCN category IV (habitat/species management area)
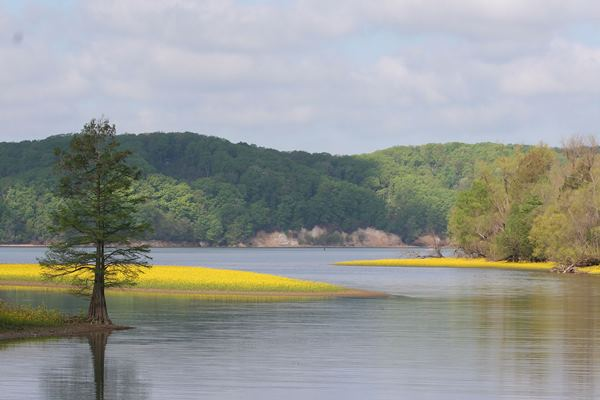

- Location within the United States
- Location: Benton, Decatur, Henry, Humphreys counties, Tennessee, United States
- Nearest city: New Johnsonville, Tennessee
- Coordinates: 35°57′N 87°57′W
- Area: 51,359 acres (207.84 km^{2})
- Established: 1945
- Governing body: U.S. Fish and Wildlife Service
- Website: Tennessee National Wildlife Refuge

Tennessee National Wildlife Refuge is a National Wildlife Refuge of the United States located along the shores of the Tennessee River in West Tennessee. It was established in 1945 where the impoundment of Kentucky Lake by the Tennessee Valley Authority has created a more-or-less permanent wetlands environment favored by many species of waterfowl. The entire refuge area is 51,359.46 acres (207.84 km²) in three units: From north to south (going upstream) they are Big Sandy (Benton and Henry counties), Duck River (Benton and Humphreys counties), and Busseltown (Decatur County).
