= Reagan, Henderson County, Tennessee =

- Unincorporated community
- Location within Tennessee Location within the United States
- Coordinates: 35°31′18″N 88°20′33″W
- Country: United States
- State: Tennessee
- County: Henderson
- Elevation: 591 ft (180 m)
- Time zone: UTC-6 (Central (CST))
  - Summer (DST): UTC-5 (CDT)
- ZIP code: 38368
- Area code: 731
- GNIS feature ID: 1299015

Reagan is an unincorporated community in Henderson County, Tennessee, United States. Its ZIP code is 38368.

Reagan was originally called "Barren Springs", and under the latter name was founded in 1881. A post office called Reagan has been in operation since 1884.
