= Perryville, Tennessee =

Unincorporated town in Tennessee, US

Coordinates: 35°37′14″N 88°02′30″W

Perryville is an unincorporated town in Decatur County, Tennessee, and one of the oldest towns in Decatur County. It is located on the Tennessee River, five miles east of Parsons. Originally known as Midtown, it was incorporated as Perryville in 1821 as the county seat of Perry County, Tennessee.

There is a marina in Perryville.

== See also ==
Perry County, Tennessee § History
