= Bruceton, Tennessee =

- Town
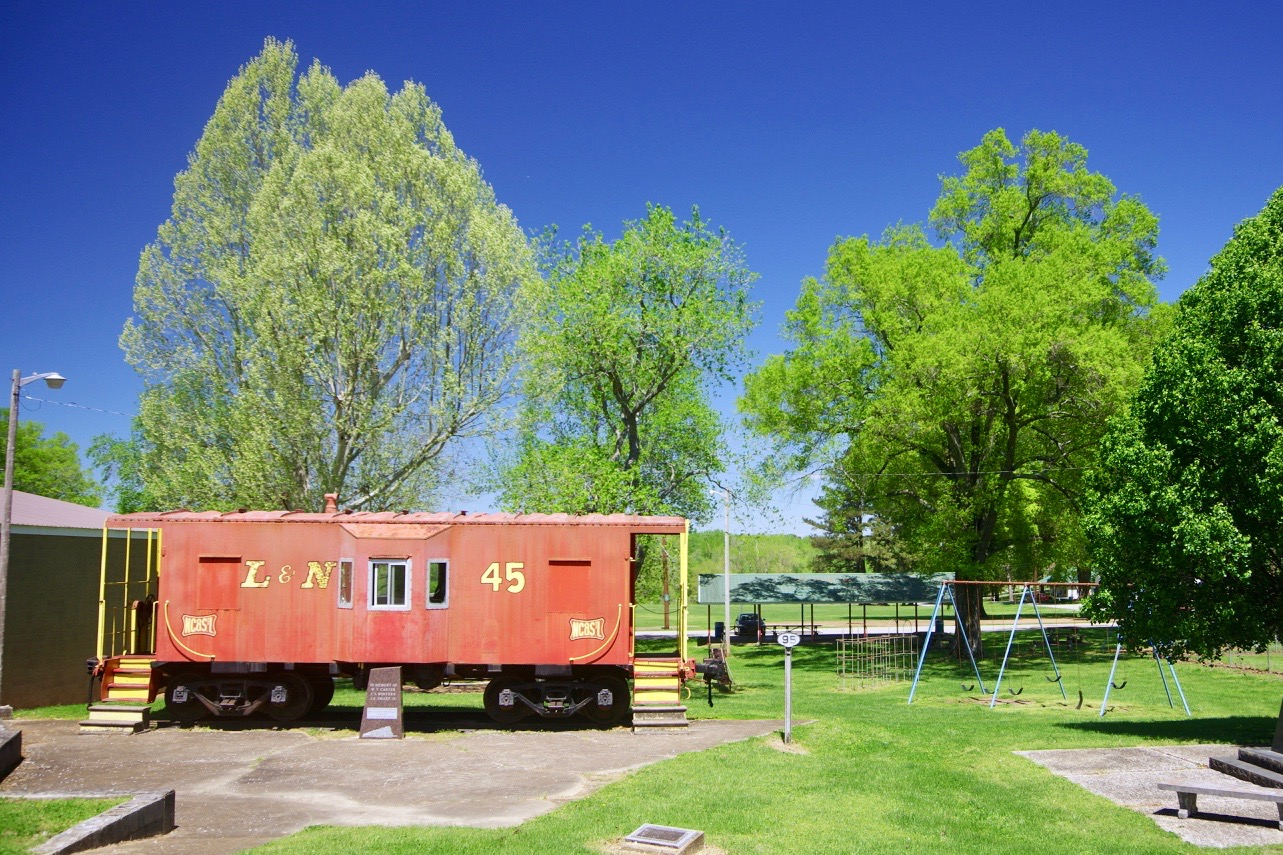
- Templeton Park

- Location of Bruceton in Carroll County, Tennessee.

- Location of Bruceton, Tennessee
- Coordinates: 36°2′14″N 88°14′42″W
- Country: United States
- State: Tennessee
- County: Carroll
- Incorporated: 1925
- Named for: W.P. Bruce

Area
  - Total: 1.68 sq mi (4.36 km^{2})
  - Land: 1.68 sq mi (4.36 km^{2})
  - Water: 0 sq mi (0.00 km^{2})
- Elevation: 472 ft (144 m)

Population (2020)
  - Total: 1,507
  - Density: 896.0/sq mi (345.94/km^{2})
- Time zone: UTC-6 (Central (CST))
  - Summer (DST): UTC-5 (CDT)
- ZIP code: 38317
- Area code: 731
- FIPS code: 47-08960
- GNIS feature ID: 1305469
- Website: https://townofbrucetontn.gov/

Bruceton is a town in Carroll County, Tennessee, United States. The population was 1,507 in the 2020 census.

Bruceton and neighbouring town Hollow Rock share a school district, the Hollow Rock-Bruceton Special School District.

== Geography ==
According to the United States Census Bureau, the town has a total area of 1.9 square miles (4.9 km^{2}), all land.

== Demographics ==
Historical population
Census	Pop.	Note	%±
1930	1,112		—
1940	1,003		−9.8%
1950	1,204		20.0%
1960	1,158		−3.8%
1970	1,450		25.2%
1980	1,579		8.9%
1990	1,586		0.4%
2000	1,554		−2.0%
2010	1,478		−4.9%
2020	1,507		2.0%

As of the census of 2000, there were 1554 people and 640 households in the town. The population density was 800.4 inhabitants per square mile (309.0/km^{2}). There were 702 housing units at an average density of 361.6/sq mi (139.6/km^{2}). The racial makeup of the town was 94.14% White, 4.36% African American, 0.06% Native American, 0.13% Asian, 0.13% from other races, and 0.90% from two or more races. Hispanic or Latino of any race were 0.32% of the population.

There were 640 households, out of which 27.8% had children under the age of 18 living with them, 51.7% were married couples living together, 13.0% had a female householder with no husband present, and 32.2% were non-families. 31.1% of all households were made up of individuals, and 15.8% had someone living alone who was 65 years of age or older. The average household size was 2.25 and the average family size was 2.78.

In the town, the population was spread out, with 21.3% under the age of 18, 7.7% from 18 to 24, 22.6% from 25 to 44, 24.0% from 45 to 64, and 24.4% who were 65 years of age or older. The median age was 44 years. For every 100 females, there were 82.0 males. For every 100 females age 18 and over, there were 80.1 males.

The median income for a household in the town was $28,409, and the median income for a family was $36,176. Males had a median income of $31,146 versus $19,323 for females. The per capita income for the town was $15,711. About 17.4% of families and 16.2% of the population were below the poverty line, including 18.6% of those under age 18 and 13.6% of those age 65 or over.

== Media ==
=== Radio stations ===
- WRQR-FM 105.5 "Today's Best Music with Ace & TJ in the Morning"
- WTPR-AM 710 "The Greatest Hits of All Time"
- WTPR-FM 101.7 "The Greatest Hits of All Time"

=== Newspaper ===
- The Carroll County News-Leader

== Notable person ==
- Patrick Willis – former NFL linebacker for the San Francisco 49ers

== Culture ==
Incorporated in 1925, Bruceton celebrated its centennial of incorporation in 2025.

In the past, Bruceton held a thriving textile and railroad economy. The town serves as a bedroom community for employers like Granges and Chemours and larger towns such as Huntingdon and Camden, Tennessee. Major employers in the town are ZLINE Kitchen and Bath, CSX Railroad, Lifecare and RAC Medical.

The town boasts all the amenities of small town living with a park with a walking track, play equipment, outdoor exercise equipment, little league and a range of small businesses.

The town has a yearly festival called Bruceton in May, featuring music, an arts and crafts festival, food trucks, and vendors. It occurs annually on the 3rd Saturday in May.

Bruceton was named after William P. Bruce, a VP of the N.C. & St. Louis Railroad, who determined the railroad route would run through the town.
