= Bath Springs, Tennessee =

- Unincorporated community
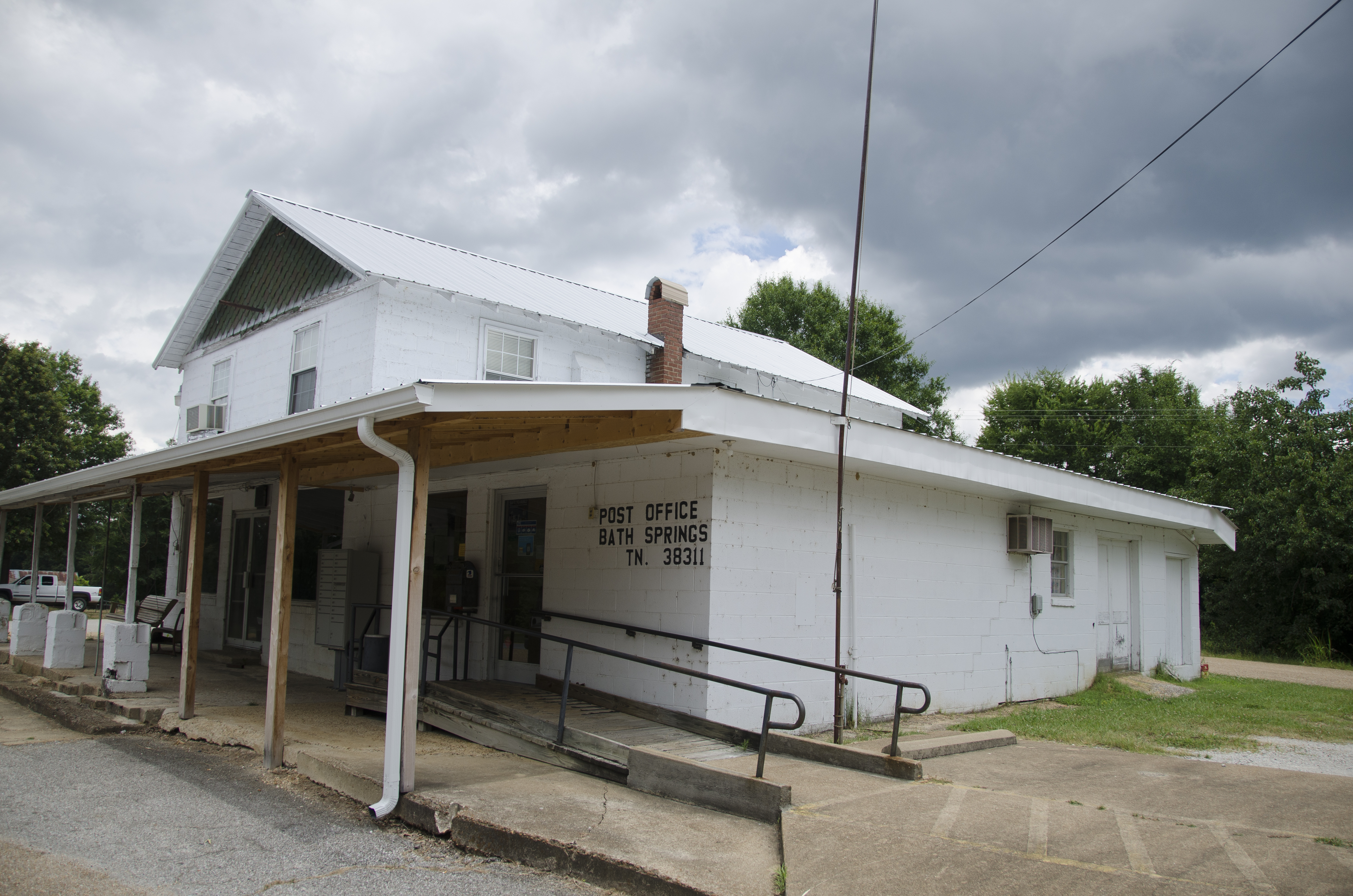
- Bath Springs Post office

- Location within Tennessee Location within the United States
- Coordinates: 35°26′23″N 88°05′16″W
- Country: United States
- State: Tennessee
- County: Decatur
- Elevation: 417 ft (127 m)
- Time zone: UTC-6 (Central (CST))
  - Summer (DST): UTC-5 (CDT)
- Zip code: 38311
- Area code: 731
- GNIS feature ID: 1276470

Bath Springs is an unincorporated community in Decatur County, Tennessee, United States. Bath Springs is located on Tennessee State Route 114 6.5 miles (10.5 km) west-northwest of Clifton.
