= Scotts Hill, Tennessee =

- Town
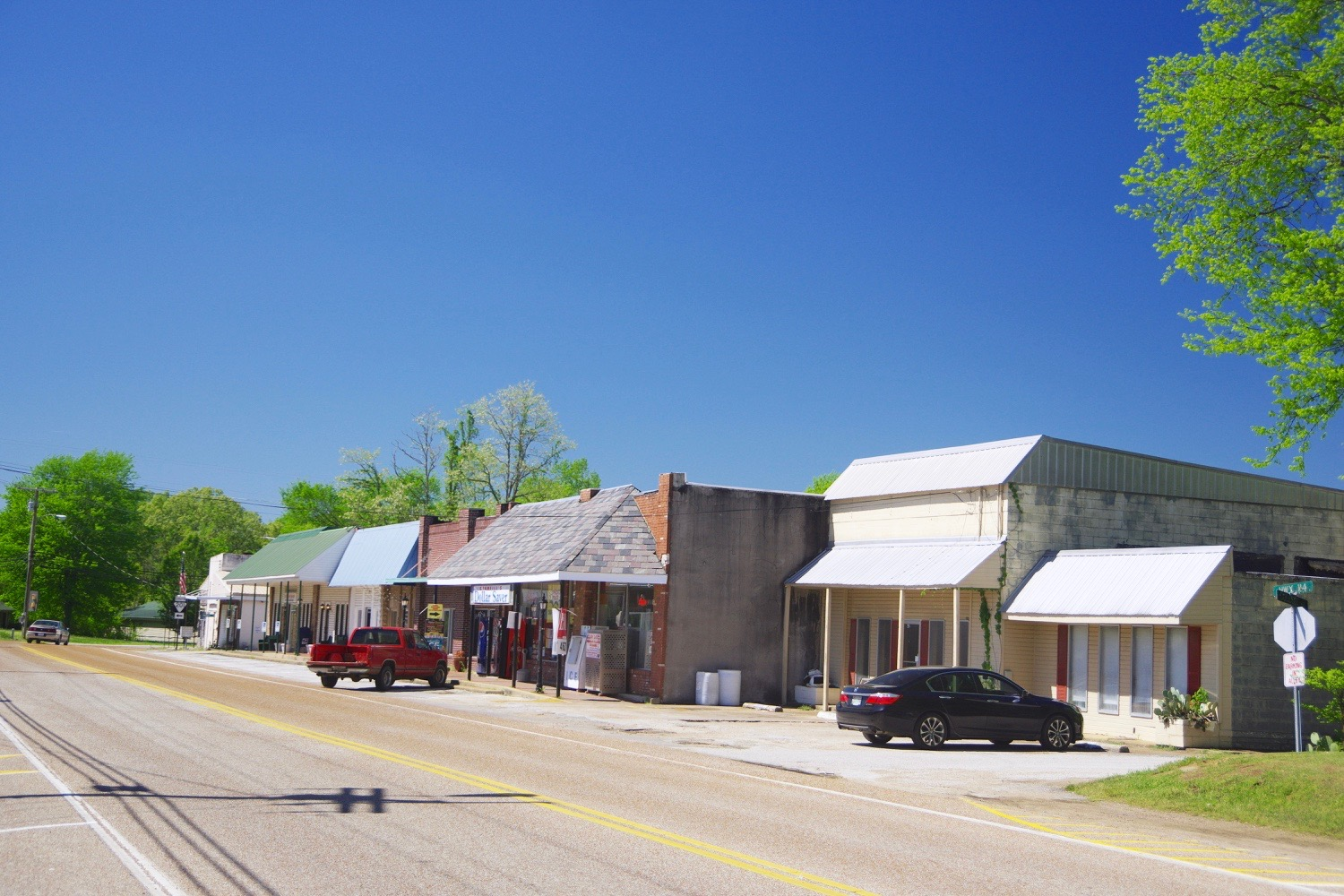
- Businesses along SR 114

- Flag

- Location of Scotts Hill in Henderson County, Tennessee.
- Coordinates: 35°30′55″N 88°15′3″W
- Country: United States
- State: Tennessee
- Counties: Henderson, Decatur
- First settled: 1825

Government
  - Mayor: Woody Capley

Area
  - Total: 3.66 sq mi (9.49 km^{2})
  - Land: 3.66 sq mi (9.49 km^{2})
  - Water: 0 sq mi (0.00 km^{2})
- Elevation: 518 ft (158 m)

Population (2020)
  - Total: 877
  - Density: 239.2/sq mi (92.37/km^{2})
- Time zone: UTC-6 (Central (CST))
  - Summer (DST): UTC-5 (CDT)
- ZIP code: 38374
- Area code: 731
- FIPS code: 47-66880
- GNIS feature ID: 1300964
- Website: cityofscottshill.com

Scotts Hill is a town in Decatur and Henderson counties in the U.S. state of Tennessee. The population was 877 at the 2020 census.

The community was named after Micajah Scott, a pioneer settler and the first merchant to settle in the town. The name "Scotts Hill" is derived from the location of Scott's store, which sat on the hill across from the current Methodist Church.

== History ==
Scotts Hill was first settled in 1825 by Charles Austin. The town was incorporated in April 1917, and Isiaac Wesley Patterson served as the first mayor. The town developed quickly, due its location on a main stagecoach route from Clifton, Tennessee to Jackson, Tennessee.

Shortly after its incorporation, in May 1917, the east end of Scotts Hill was destroyed by a severe tornado. The town was again damaged on October 16, 1917, when a fire destroyed all twelve businesses and five homes.

The Scotts Hill College opened in 1896, and ceased operation around 1917. The public water system was established in 1957.

== Geography ==
Scotts Hill is located in southeastern Henderson County and southwestern Decatur County at 35°30′55″N 88°15′3″W (35.515322, -88.250958). Tennessee State Route 100 passes through the town, north of the center, leading northeast 8 miles (13 km) to Decaturville and southwest 22 miles (35 km) to Henderson.

According to the United States Census Bureau, Scotts Hill has a total area of 3.8 square miles (9.8 km^{2}), all land.

== Demographics ==
Historical population
Census	Pop.	Note	%±
1920	123		—
1930	235		91.1%
1950	299		—
1960	298		−0.3%
1970	548		83.9%
1980	668		21.9%
1990	594		−11.1%
2000	894		50.5%
2010	984		10.1%
2020	877		−10.9%

As of the census of 2000, there were 894 people, 376 households, and 268 families residing in the town. The population density was 357.9 inhabitants per square mile (138.2/km^{2}). There were 439 housing units at an average density of 175.7 units per square mile (67.8 units/km^{2}). The racial makeup of the town was 99.22% White, 0.11% Native American, 0.34% from other races, and 0.34% from two or more races. Hispanic or Latino of any race were 1.01% of the population.

There were 376 households, out of which 31.6% had children under the age of 18 living with them, 56.1% were married couples living together, 11.2% had a female householder with no husband present, and 28.7% were non-families. 27.1% of all households were made up of individuals, and 16.8% had someone living alone who was 65 years of age or older. The average household size was 2.36 and the average family size was 2.81.

In the town, the population was spread out, with 24.6% under the age of 18, 6.9% from 18 to 24, 26.0% from 25 to 44, 25.2% from 45 to 64, and 17.3% who were 65 years of age or older. The median age was 39 years. For every 100 females, there were 86.3 males. For every 100 females age 18 and over, there were 88.8 males.

The median income for a household in the town was $28,750, and the median income for a family was $36,125. Males had a median income of $25,625 versus $21,111 for females. The per capita income for the town was $19,141. About 13.1% of families and 18.2% of the population were below the poverty line, including 26.6% of those under age 18 and 21.7% of those age 65 or over.

== Education ==
Scotts Hill Elementary School currently operates pre-kindergarten through eighth grade. The nearby high school, Scotts Hill High School, is located in Reagan, Tennessee.
