= Saltillo, Tennessee =

- Town
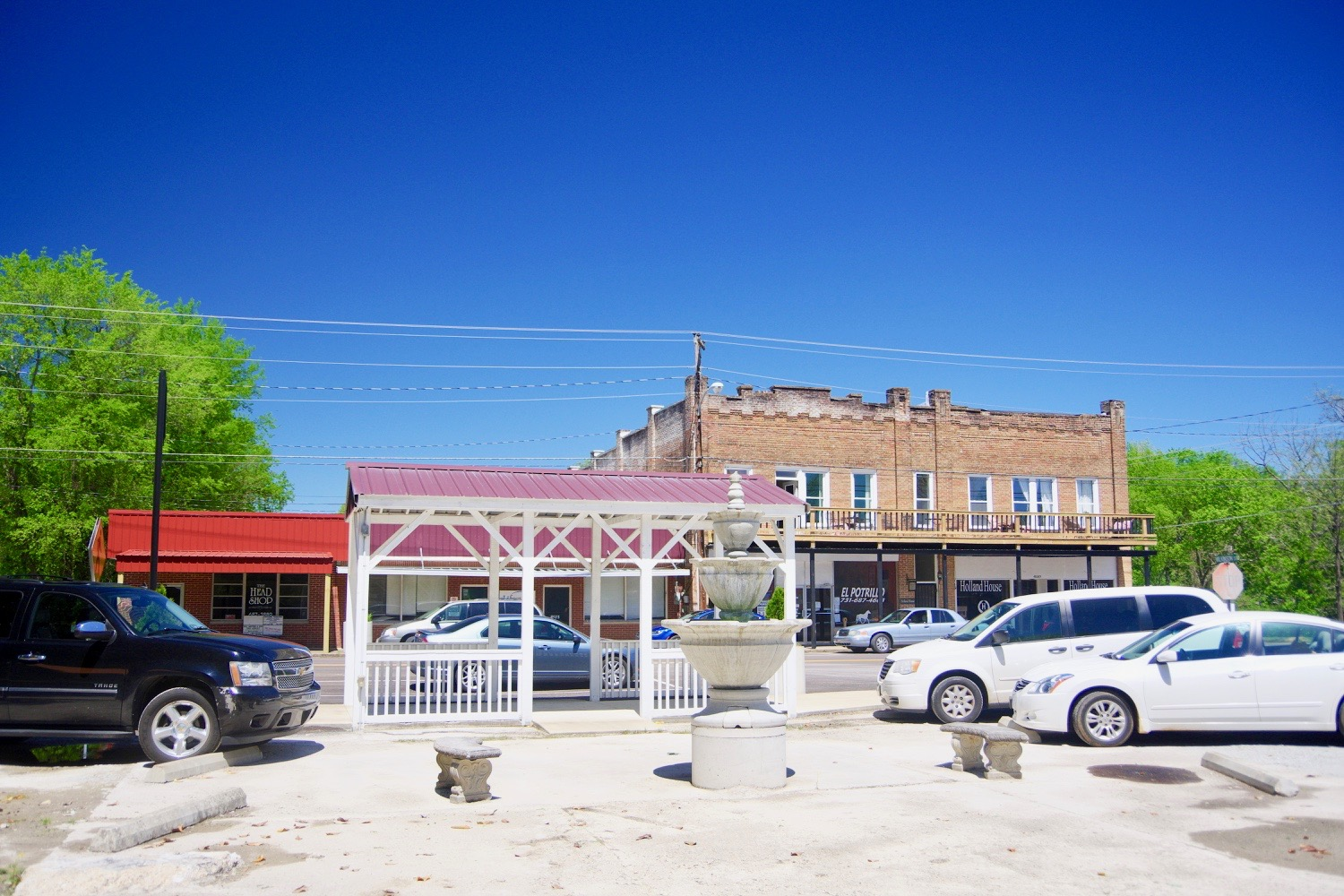
- Buildings along Main Street (SR 69)

- Location of Saltillo in Hardin County, Tennessee.
- Coordinates: 35°22′50″N 88°12′44″W
- Country: United States
- State: Tennessee
- County: Hardin

Government
  - Mayor: David "The King" Willis

Area
  - Total: 3.07 sq mi (7.96 km^{2})
  - Land: 3.07 sq mi (7.95 km^{2})
  - Water: 0.0039 sq mi (0.01 km^{2})
- Elevation: 413 ft (126 m)

Population (2020)
  - Total: 420
  - Density: 136.8/sq mi (52.81/km^{2})
- Time zone: UTC-6 (Central (CST))
  - Summer (DST): UTC-5 (CDT)
- ZIP code: 38370
- Area code: 731
- FIPS code: 47-66340
- GNIS feature ID: 1300596

Saltillo is a town in Hardin County, Tennessee, United States. The population was 420 at the 2020 census. Saltillo is located on the left bank of the Tennessee River, about 12 miles north of Savannah.

== History ==
Saltillo was founded by Thomas Shannon in October 1822. He had left Davidson County, Tennessee and arrived in the area on a keelboat with enough provisions to last one year, two men, Colonel John Holland and Parkerson Mitchell, to assist him, and four black slaves. The men arrived via Tennessee River and built camp about half a mile from the river. Shannon's wife and seven children came by land with a drive of forty cattle. This cattle would serve as the starting point for Shannon to raise cattle for income, but the cattle were unable to adapt to the change in their environment and feeding. Within three months of grazing, 39 of the 40 cattle were dead. Shortly after the Shannon family's arrival, Shannon and his sons built a log cabin in 1825, serving as the first house built in Saltillo. Shortly thereafter a store-house was built by Smith Hawkins for dry goods to be distributed, which were sold out within three months. The area where this store-house was built is now called Hawkin's Landing.

More settlers came to the area and another store was built a quarter mile south of the first store by Hawkin's brother, Perry. The first man to be killed in town was Simpson Lee, who was thrown off his horse. Barges began regularly delivering goods and residents would travel as far as the Duck River for a grist mill. In 1842 Thomas Davy purchased the land once owned by Thomas Shannon and it was named Davy's Landing. In 1849 Davy leased the land to Scott Terry, who renamed the area Saltillo. The town was named Saltillo after Saltillo, Mexico by Terry, who was a veteran of the Mexican–American War. The Saltillo post office was opened in 1850. Saltillo was incorporated in 1870.

== Geography ==
Saltillo is located at 35°22′50″N 88°12′44″W.

According to the United States Census Bureau, the town has a total area of 0.9 square miles (2.3 km^{2}), all land.

== Demographics ==
Historical population
Census	Pop.	Note	%±
1880	263		—
1890	354		34.6%
1960	397		—
1970	423		6.5%
1980	434		2.6%
1990	383		−11.8%
2000	342		−10.7%
2010	303		−11.4%
2020	420		38.6%

As of the census of 2000, there were 342 people, 155 households, and 93 families residing in the town. The population density was 382.2 inhabitants per square mile (147.6/km^{2}). There were 243 housing units at an average density of 271.6 per square mile (104.9/km^{2}). The racial makeup of the town was 75.73% White, 23.39% African American, 0.29% Native American, and 0.58% from two or more races.

There were 155 households, out of which 23.2% had children under the age of 18 living with them, 43.2% were married couples living together, 12.9% had a female householder with no husband present, and 40.0% were non-families. 36.1% of all households were made up of individuals, and 20.6% had someone living alone who was 65 years of age or older. The average household size was 2.21 and the average family size was 2.84.

In the town, the population was spread out, with 20.2% under the age of 18, 5.8% from 18 to 24, 21.3% from 25 to 44, 32.2% from 45 to 64, and 20.5% who were 65 years of age or older. The median age was 46 years. For every 100 females, there were 85.9 males. For every 100 females age 18 and over, there were 80.8 males.

The median income for a household in the town was $20,583, and the median income for a family was $26,250. Males had a median income of $26,875 versus $17,813 for females. The per capita income for the town was $12,953. About 9.4% of families and 13.5% of the population were below the poverty line, including 17.0% of those under age 18 and 20.5% of those age 65 or over.

== Economy ==
=== Economic history ===
Saltillo was a shipping point, distributing cotton and staves as late as 1861. During this time period, the town had one Methodist church, a Masonic lodge, two general stores, multiple grist mills, two saw mills, two tanneries and stave manufacturers and dealers. Saltillo was also described historically as a fishing town. A H.I.S. clothing factory was located in Saltillo and was a major local employer until closing around 1997. Many of the residents are now self-employed, or work in larger surrounding communities including Lexington, Savannah, and Counce.

== Arts and culture ==
Architecture within the area reaches back to the 1840s, including an early farmhouse and Greek Revival buildings. The Parker House was built around 1906 by Luther Parker, a local doctor, and is now a bed and breakfast. The Meady White House has Greek Revival and Italianate influences and was built with slave labor in 1847 by Meady White, who helped found the town. Cemeteries are also located in the area, pre-dating the American Civil War.
