= Chesterfield, Tennessee =

- Census-designated place
- Location within Tennessee Location within the United States
- Coordinates: 35°38′04″N 88°16′01″W
- Country: United States
- State: Tennessee
- County: Henderson

Area
  - Total: 7.70 sq mi (19.93 km^{2})
  - Land: 7.68 sq mi (19.90 km^{2})
  - Water: 0.015 sq mi (0.04 km^{2})
- Elevation: 404 ft (123 m)

Population (2020)
  - Total: 543
  - Density: 70.7/sq mi (27.29/km^{2})
- Time zone: UTC-6 (Central (CST))
  - Summer (DST): UTC-5 (CDT)
- ZIP code: 38351
- Area code: 731
- GNIS feature ID: 1280369

Chesterfield is a census-designated place and unincorporated community in Henderson County, Tennessee, United States. Its population was 469 as of the 2010 census.

== Demographics ==
Historical population
Census	Pop.	Note	%±
2020	543		—
U.S. Decennial Census
