= Decatur County, Tennessee =

County in Tennessee, United States

- County
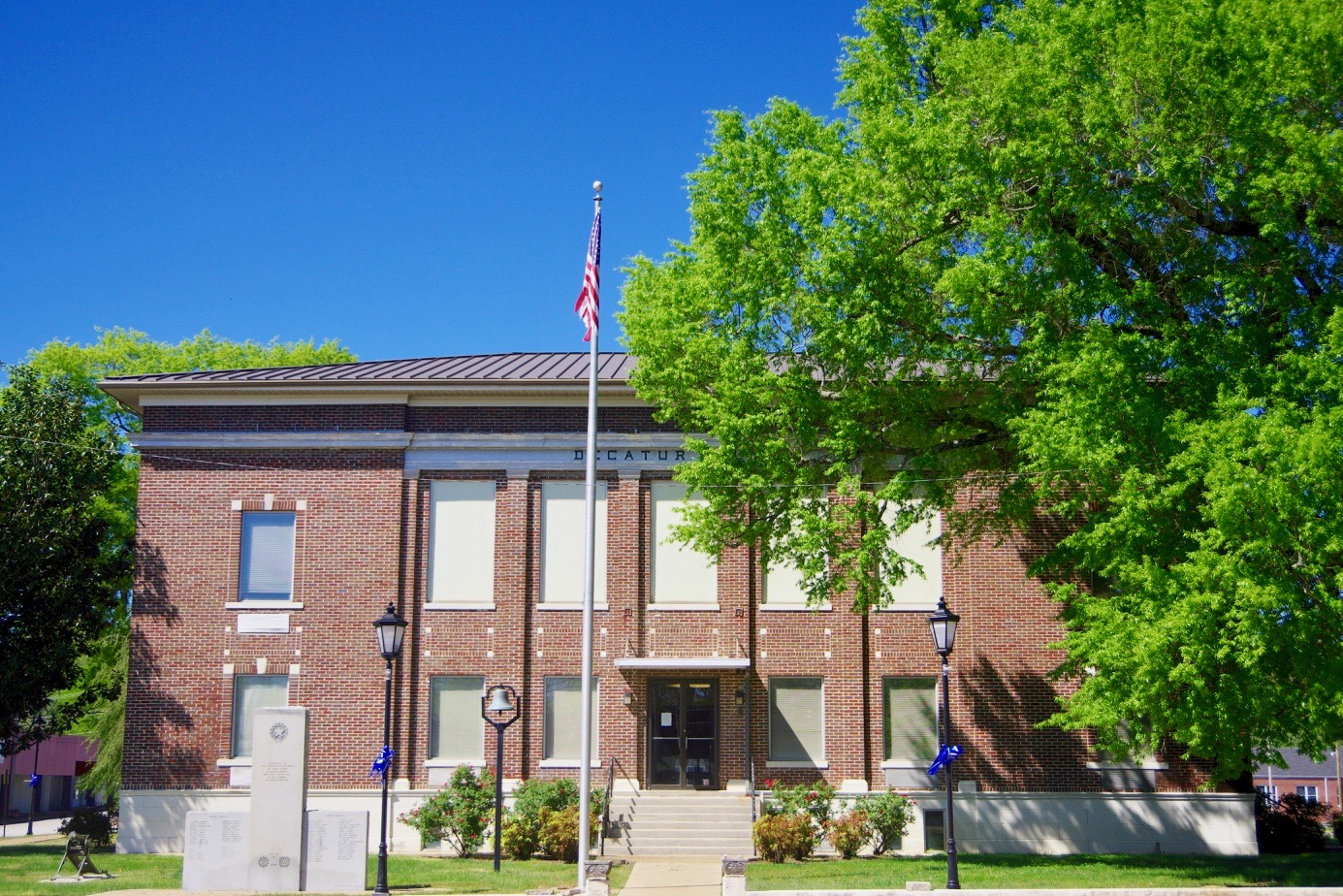
- Decatur County Courthouse in Decaturville

- Seal

- Location within the U.S. state of Tennessee
- Coordinates: 35°37′N 88°07′W
- Country: United States
- State: Tennessee
- Founded: November 1845
- Named for: Stephen Decatur
- Seat: Decaturville
- Largest city: Parsons

Area
  - Total: 345 sq mi (890 km^{2})
  - Land: 334 sq mi (870 km^{2})
  - Water: 11 sq mi (28 km^{2}) 3.2%

Population (2020)
  - Total: 11,435
  - Estimate (2025): 11,820 ▲
  - Density: 35/sq mi (14/km^{2})
- Time zone: UTC−6 (Central)
  - Summer (DST): UTC−5 (CDT)
- Congressional district: 7th
- Website: decaturcountytn.gov

Decatur County is a county located in the U.S. state of Tennessee. As of the 2020 census, the population was 11,435. Its county seat is Decaturville.

== History ==
This county is named after naval hero Stephen Decatur Jr., who gained national recognition in the First Barbary War, the Second Barbary War, and the War of 1812 by his leadership and achievements at sea. The county was created in November 1845 from the part of Perry County west of the Tennessee River in response to a petition by citizens on the west side of the river.

Like several other counties west of the Tennessee River, Decatur County was substantially pro-Union during the Civil War, contrary to the generally pro-Confederate sympathies of West and Middle Tennessee. In Tennessee's Ordinance of Secession referendum on June 8, 1861, Decatur County voted to remain in the Union by a margin of 550 to 310, being one of only eight counties in West or Middle Tennessee to support the Union. Earlier on February 9, 1861, Decatur County voters had voted against holding a secession convention by a margin of 514 to 251.

In 2015, the Decatur County clerk of court and the entire staff of that office resigned, to express conscientious objection to the United States Supreme Court's ruling in Obergefell v. Hodges, which would oblige the office to issue marriage licenses to same-sex couples.

== Geography ==
According to the U.S. Census Bureau, the county has a total area of 345 square miles (890 km^{2}), of which 334 square miles (870 km^{2}) is land and 11 square miles (28 km^{2}) (3.2%) is water.

=== Adjacent counties ===
- Benton County (north)
- Perry County (east)
- Wayne County (southeast)
- Hardin County (south)
- Henderson County (west)
- Carroll County (northwest)

=== National protected area ===
- Tennessee National Wildlife Refuge (part)

=== State protected area ===
- Carroll Cabin Barrens State Natural Area
- Cypress Pond Refuge

== Demographics ==
Historical population
Census	Pop.	Note	%±
1850	6,003		—
1860	6,276		4.5%
1870	7,772		23.8%
1880	8,498		9.3%
1890	8,995		5.8%
1900	10,439		16.1%
1910	10,093		−3.3%
1920	10,198		1.0%
1930	10,106		−0.9%
1940	10,261		1.5%
1950	9,442		−8.0%
1960	8,324		−11.8%
1970	9,457		13.6%
1980	10,857		14.8%
1990	10,472		−3.5%
2000	11,731		12.0%
2010	11,757		0.2%
2020	11,435		−2.7%
2025 (est.)	11,820	▲	3.4%
U.S. Decennial Census; 1790-1960 1900-1990; 1990-2000 2010-2014

=== Racial and ethnic composition ===
Decatur County, Tennessee – Racial and ethnic composition Note: the US Census treats Hispanic/Latino as an ethnic category. This table excludes Latinos from the racial categories and assigns them to a separate category. Hispanics/Latinos may be of any race.
Race / ethnicity (NH = Non-Hispanic)	Pop 1980	Pop 1990	Pop 2000	Pop 2010	Pop 2020	% 1980	% 1990	% 2000	% 2010	% 2020
White alone (NH)	10,263	9,961	10,954	10,947	10,462	94.53%	95.12%	93.38%	93.11%	91.49%
Black or African American alone (NH)	480	417	406	337	270	4.42%	3.98%	3.46%	2.87%	2.36%
Native American or Alaska Native alone (NH)	12	23	26	23	9	0.11%	0.22%	0.22%	0.20%	0.08%
Asian alone (NH)	9	21	20	25	42	0.08%	0.20%	0.17%	0.21%	0.37%
Native Hawaiian or Pacific Islander alone (NH)	x	x	3	6	5	x	x	0.03%	0.05%	0.04%
Other race alone (NH)	3	1	7	1	15	0.03%	0.01%	0.06%	0.01%	0.13%
Mixed race or Multiracial (NH)	x	x	86	110	274	x	x	0.73%	0.94%	2.40%
Hispanic or Latino (any race)	90	49	229	308	358	0.83%	0.47%	1.95%	2.62%	3.13%
Total	10,857	10,472	11,731	11,757	11,435	100.00%	100.00%	100.00%	100.00%	100.00%

=== 2020 census ===
As of the 2020 United States census, the county had a population of 11,435, 4,894 households, and 3,059 families residing in the county.

The median age was 47.6 years. 20.2% of residents were under the age of 18 and 24.8% of residents were 65 years of age or older. For every 100 females there were 99.5 males, and for every 100 females age 18 and over there were 97.1 males age 18 and over.

There were 4,894 households in the county, of which 25.4% had children under the age of 18 living in them. Of all households, 48.5% were married-couple households, 20.0% were households with a male householder and no spouse or partner present, and 25.6% were households with a female householder and no spouse or partner present. About 30.8% of all households were made up of individuals and 16.2% had someone living alone who was 65 years of age or older.

There were 6,557 housing units, of which 25.4% were vacant. Among occupied housing units, 76.7% were owner-occupied and 23.3% were renter-occupied. The homeowner vacancy rate was 1.6% and the rental vacancy rate was 11.0%.

<0.1% of residents lived in urban areas, while 100.0% lived in rural areas.

Hispanic or Latino residents of any race comprised 3.13% of the population.

=== 2000 census ===
As of the census of 2000, there were 11,731 people, 4,908 households, and 3,415 families residing in the county. The population density was 35 people per square mile (14 people/km^{2}).

There were 6,448 housing units at an average density of 19 units per square mile (7.3/km^{2}). The racial makeup of the county was 94.12% White, 3.47% Black or African American, 0.23% Native American, 0.20% Asian, 0.03% Pacific Islander, 1.20% from other races, and 0.76% from two or more races. 1.95% of the population were Hispanic or Latino of any race.

There were 4,908 households, out of which 27.30% had children under the age of 18 living with them, 56.70% were married couples living together, 9.00% had a female householder with no husband present, and 30.40% were non-families. 27.60% of all households were made up of individuals, and 13.40% had someone living alone who was 65 years of age or older. The average household size was 2.34 and the average family size was 2.82.

In the county, the population was spread out, with 21.70% under the age of 18, 7.90% from 18 to 24, 25.90% from 25 to 44, 26.30% from 45 to 64, and 18.20% who were 65 years of age or older. The median age was 41 years. For every 100 females there were 94.50 males. For every 100 females age 18 and over, there were 91.90 males.

The median income for a household in the county was $28,741, and the median income for a family was $34,919. Males had a median income of $25,945 versus $20,155 for females. The per capita income for the county was $17,285. About 13.80% of families and 16.00% of the population were below the poverty line, including 18.90% of those under age 18 and 22.20% of those age 65 or over.

== Communities ==
=== City ===
- Parsons

=== Towns ===
- Decaturville (county seat)
- Scotts Hill (partial)

=== Unincorporated communities ===
- Bath Springs
- Bible Hill
- Dunbar
- Holladay (partial)
- Hopewell
- Lick Skillet
- Perryville
- Sugar Tree

== Politics ==
Decatur County – like all of rural Tennessee – is a Republican stronghold. The last Democrat to carry this county was Al Gore in 2000, and even before the collapse of traditional rural Democratic support after Bill Clinton the county had a sizeable Unionist population that caused it to vote Republican several times during the "System of 1896".

United States presidential election results for Decatur County, Tennessee
Year	Republican		Democratic		Third party(ies)	
Year	No.	%	No.	%	No.	%
1912	405	24.27%	758	45.42%	506	30.32%
1916	893	49.69%	887	49.36%	17	0.95%
1920	1,608	57.84%	1,149	41.33%	23	0.83%
1924	799	47.11%	877	51.71%	20	1.18%
1928	748	48.04%	809	51.96%	0	0.00%
1932	601	36.58%	1,020	62.08%	22	1.34%
1936	919	37.96%	1,502	62.04%	0	0.00%
1940	1,275	40.90%	1,832	58.77%	10	0.32%
1944	1,235	44.70%	1,515	54.83%	13	0.47%
1948	1,291	42.75%	1,565	51.82%	164	5.43%
1952	1,406	45.35%	1,681	54.23%	13	0.42%
1956	1,512	48.76%	1,554	50.11%	35	1.13%
1960	1,684	54.76%	1,321	42.96%	70	2.28%
1964	1,429	44.08%	1,813	55.92%	0	0.00%
1968	1,409	36.79%	877	22.90%	1,544	40.31%
1972	2,368	64.79%	1,187	32.48%	100	2.74%
1976	1,637	39.77%	2,432	59.09%	47	1.14%
1980	2,095	48.95%	2,139	49.98%	46	1.07%
1984	2,390	53.82%	2,031	45.73%	20	0.45%
1988	2,286	54.55%	1,880	44.86%	25	0.60%
1992	1,667	35.76%	2,633	56.49%	361	7.75%
1996	1,712	40.53%	2,262	53.55%	250	5.92%
2000	2,046	46.82%	2,278	52.13%	46	1.05%
2004	2,566	52.59%	2,268	46.48%	45	0.92%
2008	3,101	65.11%	1,566	32.88%	96	2.02%
2012	2,874	67.61%	1,303	30.65%	74	1.74%
2016	3,588	78.14%	894	19.47%	110	2.40%
2020	4,229	80.69%	904	17.25%	108	2.06%
2024	4,596	84.08%	819	14.98%	51	0.93%

== See also ==
- National Register of Historic Places listings in Decatur County, Tennessee
