= Parsons, Tennessee =

- City
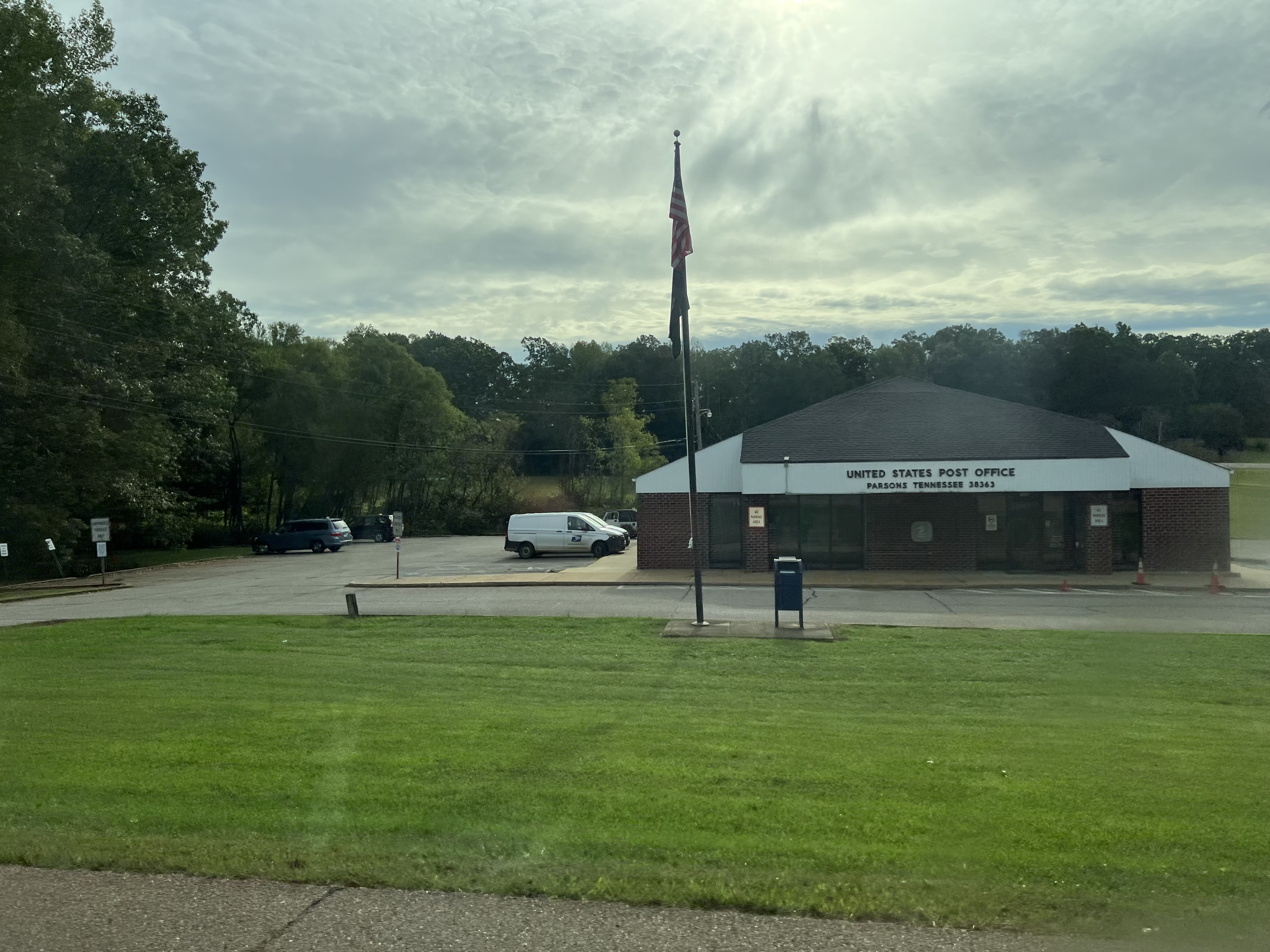

- Flag Seal
- Motto: Take Pride In Parsons!
- Location of Parsons in Decatur County, Tennessee.
- Coordinates: 35°38′56″N 88°7′24″W
- Country: United States
- State: Tennessee
- County: Decatur

Area
  - Total: 4.05 sq mi (10.48 km^{2})
  - Land: 4.05 sq mi (10.48 km^{2})
  - Water: 0 sq mi (0.00 km^{2})
- Elevation: 495 ft (151 m)

Population (2020)
  - Total: 2,100
  - Density: 519.0/sq mi (200.37/km^{2})
- Time zone: UTC-6 (Central (CST))
  - Summer (DST): UTC-5 (CDT)
- ZIP code: 38363
- Area code: 731
- FIPS code: 47-57080
- GNIS feature ID: 1296893
- Website: www.cityofparsons.com

Parsons is a city in Decatur County, Tennessee, United States. As of the 2020 census, Parsons had a population of 2,100. Parsons is the largest city by population in Decatur County.

== History ==
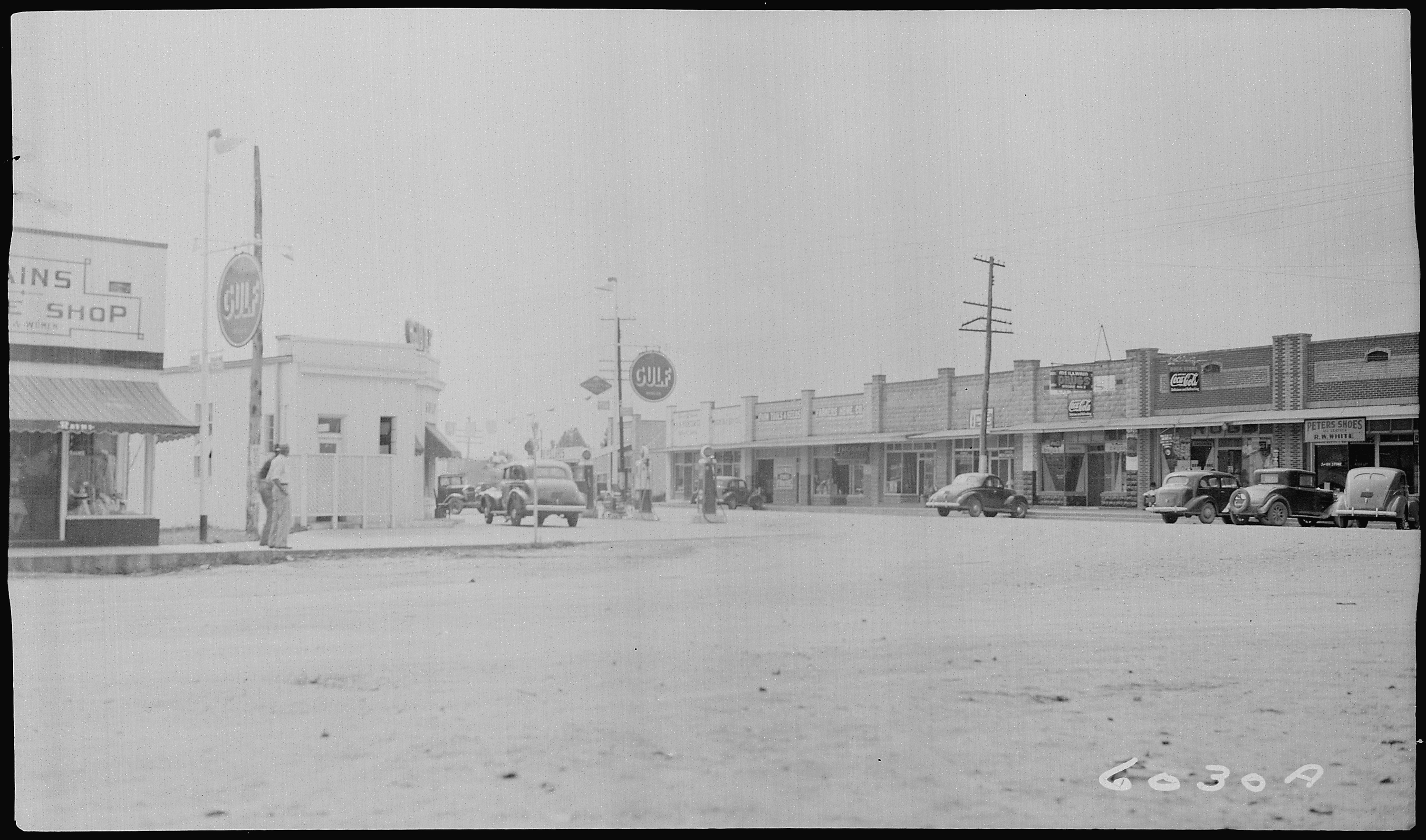
Parsons business district, 1940

Created around 1889 by the Tennessee Midland Railroad Company (TMRC), the city of Parsons was founded by Henry Myracle as he deeded 143 1/3 acres to the TMRC to start a town on his land. The railroad established Parsons Improvement Co. and Myracle maintained the town. The rail depot was located where the present day BP One Stop is located. A commercial lot, which was used as a tie yard was at present location of CB&S Bank. A storage lot and livestock pens were located where Townsend Chevrolet is presently located. There was a large water tank beside the depot and two packing houses nearby for farmers' produce. There was also a town pump and a small park near the water tank.

The Perryville branch of the railroad (TMRC) was known as the "Pea Vine". The train itself was known as the "Hot Shot" or "Cannonball".

== Geography ==
Parsons is located in central Decatur County at 35°38′56″N 88°7′24″W (35.648780, -88.123386). U.S. Routes 412 and 641 cross in the center of town. US 412 leads east 69 miles (111 km) to Columbia and west 42 miles (68 km) to Jackson, while US 641 leads north 30 miles (48 km) to Camden and south 24 miles (39 km) to Clifton. Decaturville, the county seat, is 5 miles (8 km) south on US 641.

According to the United States Census Bureau, Parsons has a total area of 4.1 square miles (10.7 km^{2}), all land.

The unincorporated community of Perryville, the oldest settlement in Decatur County, is 5 miles (8 km) east of Parsons, along the Tennessee River. Tennessee's highest recorded temperature at 113 °F (45 °C) was recorded there on August 9, 1930.

=== Climate ===
According to the Köppen Climate Classification system, Parsons has a humid subtropical climate, abbreviated "Cfa" on climate maps. The hottest temperature recorded in Parsons was 109 °F (42.8 °C) on August 16, 2007, while the coldest temperature recorded was −1 °F (−18.3 °C) on December 23–24, 2022.

Climate data for Parsons, Tennessee, 1991–2020 normals, extremes 1998–present
Month	Jan	Feb	Mar	Apr	May	Jun	Jul	Aug	Sep	Oct	Nov	Dec	Year
Record high °F (°C)	75 (24)	82 (28)	88 (31)	92 (33)	95 (35)	106 (41)	105 (41)	109 (43)	103 (39)	97 (36)	88 (31)	78 (26)	109 (43)
Mean maximum °F (°C)	69.1 (20.6)	73.3 (22.9)	81.7 (27.6)	86.8 (30.4)	90.7 (32.6)	95.6 (35.3)	97.5 (36.4)	98.3 (36.8)	94.8 (34.9)	88.9 (31.6)	78.5 (25.8)	71.6 (22.0)	99.7 (37.6)
Mean daily maximum °F (°C)	50.4 (10.2)	54.8 (12.7)	64.0 (17.8)	73.5 (23.1)	80.7 (27.1)	87.3 (30.7)	90.9 (32.7)	90.6 (32.6)	85.1 (29.5)	75.2 (24.0)	63.1 (17.3)	53.2 (11.8)	72.4 (22.5)
Daily mean °F (°C)	39.4 (4.1)	43.1 (6.2)	51.3 (10.7)	60.1 (15.6)	68.7 (20.4)	76.2 (24.6)	79.9 (26.6)	78.9 (26.1)	72.3 (22.4)	61.0 (16.1)	49.9 (9.9)	42.1 (5.6)	60.2 (15.7)
Mean daily minimum °F (°C)	28.4 (−2.0)	31.3 (−0.4)	38.5 (3.6)	46.7 (8.2)	56.8 (13.8)	65.2 (18.4)	69.0 (20.6)	67.2 (19.6)	59.6 (15.3)	46.8 (8.2)	36.7 (2.6)	31.1 (−0.5)	48.1 (9.0)
Mean minimum °F (°C)	11.7 (−11.3)	14.4 (−9.8)	22.2 (−5.4)	30.7 (−0.7)	41.1 (5.1)	53.9 (12.2)	58.8 (14.9)	57.8 (14.3)	46.7 (8.2)	30.6 (−0.8)	20.8 (−6.2)	16.4 (−8.7)	9.3 (−12.6)
Record low °F (°C)	1 (−17)	5 (−15)	8 (−13)	21 (−6)	35 (2)	45 (7)	54 (12)	48 (9)	36 (2)	21 (−6)	14 (−10)	−1 (−18)	−1 (−18)
Average precipitation inches (mm)	4.43 (113)	5.03 (128)	5.59 (142)	5.29 (134)	5.53 (140)	4.04 (103)	4.95 (126)	4.05 (103)	4.35 (110)	4.23 (107)	4.08 (104)	5.51 (140)	57.08 (1,450)
Average snowfall inches (cm)	0.8 (2.0)	0.4 (1.0)	0.4 (1.0)	0.0 (0.0)	0.0 (0.0)	0.0 (0.0)	0.0 (0.0)	0.0 (0.0)	0.0 (0.0)	0.0 (0.0)	0.0 (0.0)	0.0 (0.0)	1.6 (4)
Average precipitation days (≥ 0.01 in)	11.6	10.8	11.9	10.0	10.8	9.7	9.2	8.4	7.3	8.2	9.3	11.7	118.9
Average snowy days (≥ 0.1 in)	1.0	0.4	0.1	0.0	0.0	0.0	0.0	0.0	0.0	0.0	0.1	0.3	1.9
Source 1: NOAA
Source 2: National Weather Service (mean maxima/minima 2006–2020)

== Demographics ==
Historical population
Census	Pop.	Note	%±
1920	429		—
1930	915		113.3%
1940	1,079		17.9%
1950	1,640		52.0%
1960	1,859		13.4%
1970	2,167		16.6%
1980	2,422		11.8%
1990	2,033		−16.1%
2000	2,452		20.6%
2010	2,373		−3.2%
2020	2,100		−11.5%

=== 2020 census ===
As of the 2020 census, Parsons had a population of 2,100; the median age was 46.4 years. 21.4% of residents were under the age of 18 and 24.5% of residents were 65 years of age or older. For every 100 females there were 84.7 males, and for every 100 females age 18 and over there were 77.6 males age 18 and over.

0.0% of residents lived in urban areas, while 100.0% lived in rural areas.

There were 939 households in Parsons, of which 25.7% had children under the age of 18 living in them. Of all households, 35.1% were married-couple households, 19.3% were households with a male householder and no spouse or partner present, and 39.8% were households with a female householder and no spouse or partner present. About 38.6% of all households were made up of individuals and 20.9% had someone living alone who was 65 years of age or older.

There were 1,067 housing units, of which 12.0% were vacant. The homeowner vacancy rate was 1.6% and the rental vacancy rate was 9.0%.

Racial composition as of the 2020 census
Race	Number	Percent
White	1,822	86.8%
Black or African American	108	5.1%
American Indian and Alaska Native	2	0.1%
Asian	22	1.0%
Native Hawaiian and Other Pacific Islander	0	0.0%
Some other race	78	3.7%
Two or more races	68	3.2%
Hispanic or Latino (of any race)	112	5.3%

=== 2000 census ===
As of the census of 2000, there was a population of 2,452, with 1,063 households and 646 families residing in the city. The population density was 627.3 inhabitants per square mile (242.2/km^{2}). There were 1,205 housing units at an average density of 308.3 per square mile (119.0/km^{2}). The racial makeup of the city was 87.97% White, 8.16% African American, 0.16% Native American, 0.33% Asian, 2.45% from other races, and 0.94% from two or more races. Hispanic or Latino of any race were 2.57% of the population.

There were 1,063 households, out of which 24.5% had children under the age of 18 living with them, 44.9% were married couples living together, 12.0% had a female householder with no husband present, and 39.2% were non-families. 36.4% of all households were made up of individuals, and 18.3% had someone living alone who was 65 years of age or older. The average household size was 2.17 and the average family size was 2.81.

In the city, the population was spread out, with 20.9% under the age of 18, 8.2% from 18 to 24, 23.6% from 25 to 44, 23.8% from 45 to 64, and 23.5% who were 65 years of age or older. The median age was 43 years. For every 100 females, there were 80.4 males. For every 100 females age 18 and over, there were 73.3 males.

The median income for a household in the city was $22,688, and the median income for a family was $35,764. Males had a median income of $27,326 versus $17,326 for females. The per capita income for the city was $18,077. About 15.6% of families and 19.6% of the population were below the poverty line, including 22.2% of those under age 18 and 28.5% of those age 65 or over.

== Notable people ==
- Calvin Garrett, basketball player
- Little David Wilkins, singer and pianist
