= Decaturville, Tennessee =

- Town
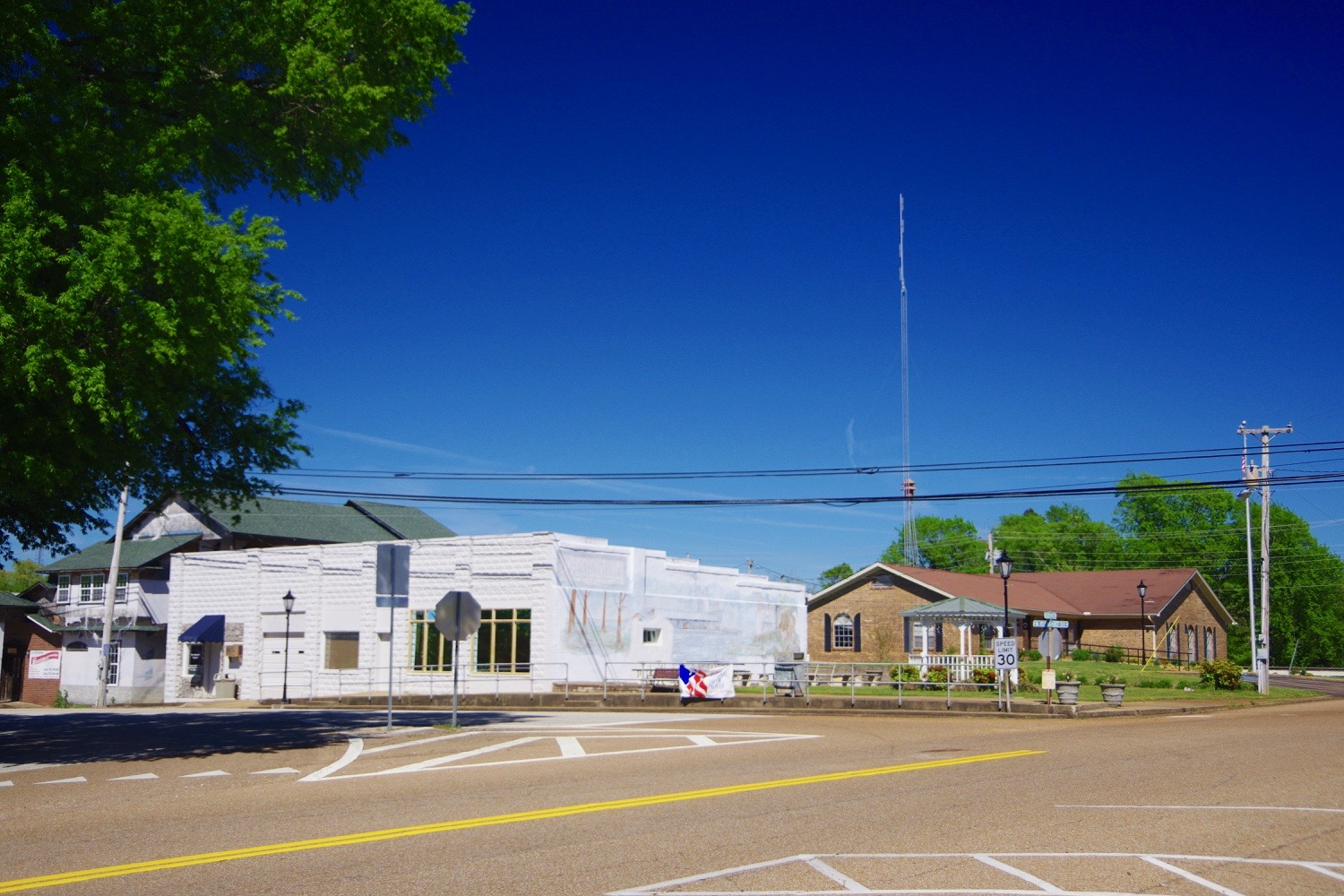
- Main Street and Pleasant Street

- Location of Decaturville in Decatur County, Tennessee.
- Coordinates: 35°34′59″N 88°7′19″W
- Country: United States
- State: Tennessee
- County: Decatur

Area
  - Total: 1.65 sq mi (4.28 km^{2})
  - Land: 1.65 sq mi (4.28 km^{2})
  - Water: 0 sq mi (0.00 km^{2})
- Elevation: 518 ft (158 m)

Population (2020)
  - Total: 807
  - Density: 488.4/sq mi (188.59/km^{2})
- Time zone: UTC-6 (Central (CST))
  - Summer (DST): UTC-5 (CDT)
- ZIP code: 38329
- Area code: 731
- FIPS code: 47-19900
- GNIS feature ID: 1282275
- Website: https://decaturvilletn.com/

Decaturville is a town in and the county seat of Decatur County, Tennessee, United States. As of the 2020 census, Decaturville had a population of 807. It is named for American Revolutionary War Commodore Stephen Decatur, Jr.

== Geography ==
Decaturville is located at 35°34′59″N 88°7′19″W (35.582983, -88.122021). According to the United States Census Bureau, the town has a total area of 1.7 square miles (4.4 km^{2}), all land.

=== Climate ===
Climate data for Decaturville, Tennessee, 1991–2020 normals, extremes 2010–present
Month	Jan	Feb	Mar	Apr	May	Jun	Jul	Aug	Sep	Oct	Nov	Dec	Year
Record high °F (°C)	74 (23)	81 (27)	87 (31)	89 (32)	92 (33)	101 (38)	101 (38)	100 (38)	98 (37)	96 (36)	88 (31)	78 (26)	101 (38)
Mean daily maximum °F (°C)	47.9 (8.8)	52.7 (11.5)	61.8 (16.6)	71.4 (21.9)	77.9 (25.5)	84.6 (29.2)	88.0 (31.1)	88.0 (31.1)	83.4 (28.6)	72.6 (22.6)	61.0 (16.1)	51.0 (10.6)	70.0 (21.1)
Daily mean °F (°C)	37.5 (3.1)	41.6 (5.3)	49.8 (9.9)	59.4 (15.2)	67.6 (19.8)	74.9 (23.8)	78.5 (25.8)	77.6 (25.3)	71.4 (21.9)	59.7 (15.4)	49.0 (9.4)	40.6 (4.8)	59.0 (15.0)
Mean daily minimum °F (°C)	27.1 (−2.7)	30.4 (−0.9)	37.7 (3.2)	47.4 (8.6)	57.3 (14.1)	65.2 (18.4)	68.9 (20.5)	67.2 (19.6)	59.4 (15.2)	46.7 (8.2)	37.0 (2.8)	30.1 (−1.1)	47.9 (8.8)
Record low °F (°C)	−2 (−19)	2 (−17)	5 (−15)	26 (−3)	34 (1)	48 (9)	54 (12)	53 (12)	40 (4)	26 (−3)	10 (−12)	−4 (−20)	−4 (−20)
Average precipitation inches (mm)	4.64 (118)	4.59 (117)	5.60 (142)	5.85 (149)	4.61 (117)	5.53 (140)	4.73 (120)	3.28 (83)	4.24 (108)	3.66 (93)	4.44 (113)	5.73 (146)	56.90 (1,445)
Average precipitation days (≥ 0.01 in)	11.6	12.6	13.2	10.6	11.6	10.7	9.7	9.8	7.5	8.3	9.8	11.7	127.1
Source 1: NOAA
Source 2: National Weather Service

== Demographics ==
Historical population
Census	Pop.	Note	%±
1850	168		—
1870	188		—
1880	252		34.0%
1920	315		—
1930	419		33.0%
1940	433		3.3%
1950	514		18.7%
1960	571		11.1%
1970	958		67.8%
1980	1,004		4.8%
1990	879		−12.5%
2000	859		−2.3%
2010	867		0.9%
2020	807		−6.9%

As of the census of 2000, there were 859 people, 349 households, and 214 families residing in the town. The population density was 511.0 inhabitants per square mile (197.3/km^{2}). There were 396 housing units at an average density of 235.6 per square mile (91.0/km^{2}). The racial makeup of the town was 85.91% White, 11.87% African American, 0.12% Native American, 0.12% from other races, and 1.98% from two or more races. Hispanic or Latino of any race were 0.12% of the population.

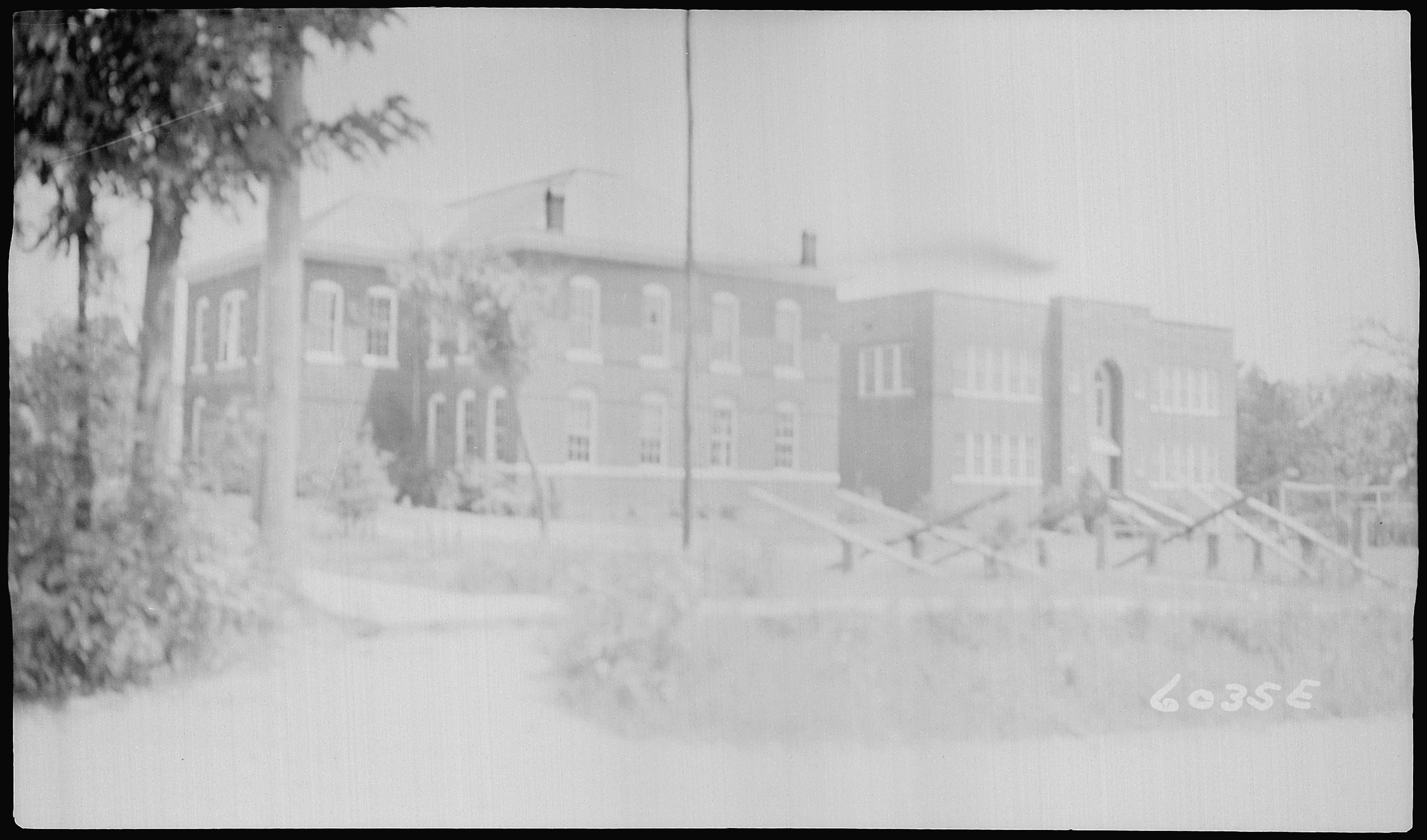
A high school in Decaturville in 1940.

There were 349 households, out of which 25.8% had children under the age of 18 living with them, 46.7% were married couples living together, 11.7% had a female householder with no husband present, and 38.4% were non-families. 35.8% of all households were made up of individuals, and 17.5% had someone living alone who was 65 years of age or older. The average household size was 2.21 and the average family size was 2.86.

In the town, the population was spread out, with 20.4% under the age of 18, 9.4% from 18 to 24, 22.7% from 25 to 44, 24.8% from 45 to 64, and 22.7% who were 65 years of age or older. The median age was 43 years. For every 100 females, there were 84.7 males. For every 100 females age 18 and over, there were 83.4 males.

The median income for a household in the town was $23,056, and the median income for a family was $37,857. Males had a median income of $30,815 versus $21,103 for females. The per capita income for the town was $14,864. About 17.9% of families and 22.4% of the population were below the poverty line, including 29.0% of those under age 18 and 23.7% of those age 65 or over.
