= U.S. Route 412 in Tennessee =

U.S. Highway in Tennessee

U.S. Route 412
- US 412 in Tennessee highlighted in red

Route information
- Maintained by TDOT
- Length: 181.93 mi (292.79 km)

Major junctions
- West end: I-155 / US 412 at the Missouri state line
- US 51 in Dyersburg US 70A / US 79 in Bells I-40 / US 412 Bus. in Jackson US 45 Byp. in Jackson; US 45 in Jackson; US 70 in Jackson; US 641 in Parsons US 43 / US 412 Bus. in Columbia US 31 in Columbia
- East end: I-65 / SR 99 in Columbia

Location
- Country: United States
- State: Tennessee
- Counties: Dyer, Crockett, Madison, Henderson, Decatur, Perry, Lewis, Maury

Highway system
- United States Numbered Highway System; List; Special; Divided; Tennessee State Routes; Interstate; US; State
← US 411	→ SR 416

In Tennessee, U.S. Route 412 (US 412) stretches for 181.93 miles (292.79 km) through the farmland of West Tennessee and the hills of Middle Tennessee, starting at the Missouri state line (on I-155 at the Mississippi River) near Dyersburg and running to an interchange between I-65 and SR 99 in Columbia.

== Route description ==
=== Dyer County ===
US 412 enters West Tennessee, concurrent with I-155, on the Caruthersville Bridge over the Mississippi River. They head east through rural areas to have interchanges with SR 181 (Exit 2) and SR 182 (Exit 7), as well as crossing a bridge over the Obion River. I-155/US 412 then cross the Chickasaw Bluffs into Dyersburg, where they pass along the northern edge of the city and have an interchange with SR 78 (Exit 13). The interstate comes to an end shortly thereafter at an interchange with US 51 (SR 3/Exit 15), where US 412 turns south along US 51. US 51 splits off not even a mile later at an interchange with SR 211, and US 412 continues south along four-lane Freeway, concurrent with unsigned SR 20. US 412/SR 20 has an interchange with SR 104, where it downgrades to a 4-lane expressway just before crossing the North Fork of the Forked Deer River and leaving Dyersburg. They then curve to the southeast as they pass through Bonicord and have a diamond interchange with SR 210. US 412/SR 20 continue southeast and cross into Crockett County.

=== Crockett County ===
US 412/SR 20 continue through farmland to the town of Friendship, to have a RIRO interchange with SR 189. They continue southeast to pass through Cairo and have a Quadrant interchange with SR 152 just before entering Alamo. US 412/SR 20 then have a parclo interchange with SR 188 before having a partial interchange with N Cavalier Drive (Old US 412/SR 20 and starting on a bypass around the west side of town. They then have a diamond interchange with SR 54/SR 88 before passing just west of downtown and then having a partial interchange with S Cavalier Drive (Old US 412/SR 20). US 412/SR 20 then leave Alamo and continue southeast through farmland and have a Quadrant interchange with SR 88 before entering Bells and coming to a Cloverleaf interchange with US 70A/US 79/SR 76, just after bypassing downtown to the northern and eastern sides. It then has a parclo interchange with the eastern end of SR 88 before leaving Bells and continuing southeast through farmland to cross into Madison County.

=== Madison County ===
The highway then enters some hills before entering Jackson and coming to a diamond interchange with Country Club Lane, about a mile from its parclo interchange with I-40 (Exit 79). At I-40, SR 20 remains hidden and follows US 412 Bus through the city while US 412 is overlapped with Interstate 40 between Exit 79 and Exit 87. I-40/US 412 head east along the north side of the city, having interchanges with US 45 Bypass (SR 186/Exit 80), US 45 (SR 5/Exit 82), Campbell Street (Exit 83), and Christmasville Road/Dr. F.E. Wright Drive (Exit 85), before coming to an interchange with US 70 (SR 1/Exit 87), where US 412 splits off from I-40 and turns southwest along US 70. US 412 then splits and turns east at the eastern end of US 412 Bus, and US 412 becomes concurrent with SR 20 again as they leave Jackson as a two-lane highway. US 412/SR 20 continue east through farmland to the community of Springbrook, where it widens to a 4-lane divided highway and has an intersection with SR 152 just before crossing into Henderson County.

=== Henderson County ===
US 412/SR 20 continue east through countryside and farmland and pass through Crucifer before narrowing to a 4-lane undivided shortly before entering Lexington. They then pass by several businesses and becomes concurrent with SR 104 before crossing over the Beech River, passing just south of the dam for Beech Lake. The highway continues past several more businesses before entering downtown and coming to an intersection with SR 22, where SR 104 splits off and goes southeast. US 412/SR 20 continues through some neighborhoods before leaving Lexington and continuing east through farmland and countryside as a 4-lane divided highway. The highway then narrows to a 4-lane undivided highway before passing through the communities of Chesterfield, where it has an intersection with SR 114, and Darden. The highway then crosses into Decatur County.

=== Decatur County ===
US 412/SR 20 then have an intersection with SR 202 before continuing east and entering Parsons. They pass by a neighborhood before narrowing to 2-lanes and entering downtown, where it has an intersection with US 641/SR 69. They continue through downtown before leaving Parsons as a 2-lane highway. US 412/SR 20 continue through largely wooded countryside before coming to Perryville and becoming concurrent with SR 100, just before crossing a bridge over the Tennessee River and entering Perry County and Middle Tennessee.

=== Perry County ===
The highway has an intersection SR 438 just south of Mousetail Landing State Park before passing through some hills before entering Linden. They pass through downtown before having an intersection with SR 13. The highway then leaves Linden after crossing a bridge over the Buffalo River and continues east to the community of Chestnut Grove, where SR 100 splits off at a Y-Intersection and goes northeast. They then pass through hilly and wooded areas as they cross into Lewis County.

=== Lewis County ===
US 412/SR 20 continues east through hilly and wooded terrain to enter farmland, just before entering the town of Hohenwald. The highway passes by some homes and businesses before entering downtown and coming to an intersection with SR 48 and SR 99, where SR 20 leaves US 412 and becomes signed for the first time while SR 99 becomes unsigned and joins US 412. US 412/SR 99 go east as a 4-lane undivided highway to leave downtown and continue east through a major business district before leaving Hohenwald and entering wooded areas, where it widens to a divided highway. The highway continues northeast through wooded areas before entering farmland, shortly before downgrading to an undivided highway, entering Gordonsburg, and having an interchange with the Natchez Trace Parkway. US 412/SR 99 then narrow to 2-lanes and continue through wooded and hilly to cross into Maury County.

=== Maury County ===
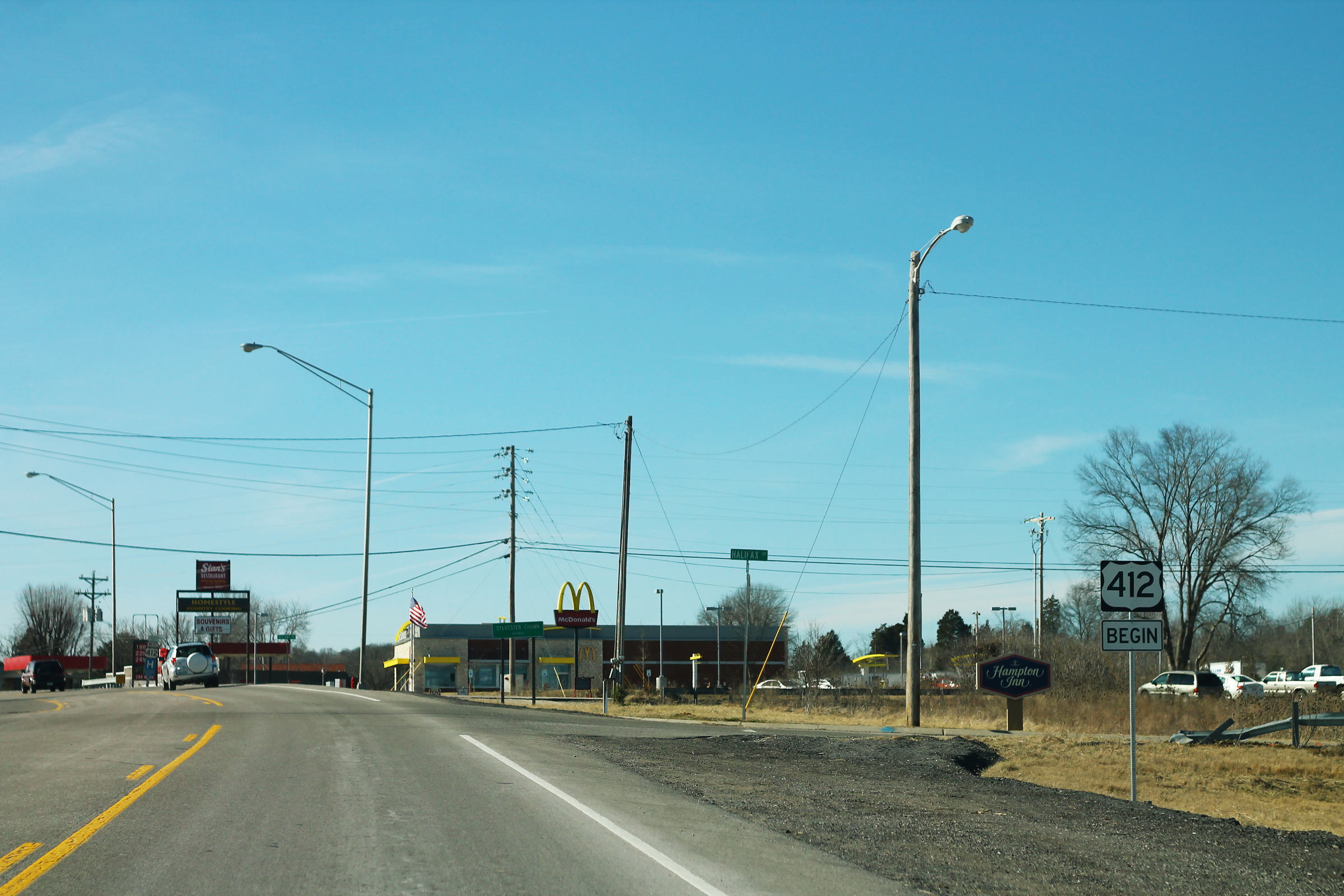
Beginning of westbound US 412 in Columbia

US 412/SR 99 continue east through farmland and pass through the community of Hampshire, where it has an intersection with SR 166. The highway continues east through farmland before entering the city of Columbia, where SR 99 separates from US 412 at an interchange with US 43/SR 6, where US 412 follows that highway while SR 99 continues into town concurrent with US 412 Bus. They bypass Columbia along the western and northern sides as a four-lane divided highway, having interchanges with SR 50, Industrial Park Road, and SR 7, before crossing the Duck River and arriving at an intersection US 31/US 412 Bus (SR 99), where US 43 and US 412 Bus ends, SR 6 heads north along US 31, and SR 99 rejoins US 412. US 412/SR 99 then narrows to 2-lanes and continues east to leave the city, though it is still within the city limits, and go through farmland to eventually come to an interchange with I-65 (Exit 46), where US 412 ends and SR 99 becomes signed as a primary highway as it leaves Columbia and continues east.

== Major intersections ==
County	Location	mi	km	Destinations	Notes
Mississippi River		0.0	0.0	Caruthersville Bridge	
Dyer		0.0	0.0	I-155 west / US 412 west – Saint Louis	Continuation into Missouri
Dyer		2.3	3.7	SR 181 (Great River Road)	I-155 exit 2
Dyer		5.4	8.7	Bridge over the Obion River	
Dyer		7.4	11.9	SR 182 (Lenox Road)	I-155 exit 7
Dyer	Dyersburg			I-69 south – Memphis,	Proposed I-69 south; future eastern terminus of I-155
Dyer	Dyersburg	13.0	20.9	SR 78 (Lake Road) – Dyersburg, Tiptonville	I-155 exit 13
Dyer	Dyersburg	15.9	25.6	US 51 north (SR 3 north/Future I-69 north) – Union City I-155 ends	I-155 exit 15; eastern terminus; western end of US 51/SR 3 concurrency
Dyer	Dyersburg	16.4– 16.7	26.4– 26.9	US 51 south / SR 211 (Saint John Avenue/SR 3 south) – Dyersburg, Newbern	Interchange; eastern end of US 51/SR 3 concurrency
Dyer	Dyersburg	19.0– 19.6	30.6– 31.5	SR 104 – Dyersburg, Trenton	Interchange; eastern end of freeway
Dyer		21.1– 21.6	34.0– 34.8	Bridge over the North Fork of the Forked Deer River	
Dyer	Bonicord	23.4– 23.8	37.7– 38.3	SR 210 south – Fowlkes, Tigrett	Interchange; northern terminus of SR 210
Crockett	Friendship	31.5– 31.8	50.7– 51.2	SR 189 south – Friendship, Maury City	Interchange; northern terminus of SR 189
Crockett	Cairo	35.2– 35.6	56.6– 57.3	SR 152 east – Humboldt	Western terminus of SR 152; interchange
Crockett	Cairo	37.2– 37.3	59.9– 60.0	SR 188 – Brownsville	Interchange
Crockett	Alamo	37.6– 37.8	60.5– 60.8	Cavalier Drive — Alamo	Interchange; eastbound exit and westbound entrance
Crockett	Alamo	38.6– 39.3	62.1– 63.2	SR 54 / SR 88 – Maury City, Alamo	Interchange
Crockett	Alamo	41.4– 41.6	66.6– 66.9	Cavalier Drive — Alamo	Interchange; westbound exit and eastbound entrance
Crockett	Bells	43.9– 44.4	70.7– 71.5	SR 88 – Alamo, Bells	Interchange
Crockett	Bells	46.2– 46.5	74.4– 74.8	US 70A / US 79 (High Street/SR 76) – Brownsville, Humboldt	Interchange
Crockett	Bells	47.3– 47.4	76.1– 76.3	SR 88 west (Old Jackson Road) – Bells	Eastern terminus of SR 88; interchange
Madison	Jackson	57.6– 58.2	92.7– 93.7	Country Club Lane	Interchange
Madison	Jackson	58.6– 58.8	94.3– 94.6	I-40 west – Memphis US 412 Bus. east (Hollywood Drive/SR 20 east) – Jackson	Western end of I-40 concurrency; western terminus of US 412 Bus; Hidden SR 20 continues east through Jackson overlapped with US 412 Business; I-40 exit 79
Madison	Jackson	59.8– 60.2	96.2– 96.9	US 45 Byp. (SR 186) – Jackson, Humboldt	I-40 exits 80 A/B
Madison	Jackson	61.3– 61.7	98.7– 99.3	US 45 (SR 5) / Vann Drive – Jackson, Milan	I-40 exits 82 A/B
Madison	Jackson	62.4	100.4	Campbell Street	I-40 exit 83
Madison	Jackson	63.9– 64.8	102.8– 104.3	Christmasville Road, Dr. F.E. Wright Drive – Jackson	I-40 exit 85
Madison	Jackson	66.3	106.7	US 70 east (SR 1 east) – Huntingdon I-40 east – Nashville	I-40 exit 87; eastern end of I-40 concurrency; western end of wrong-way US 70/SR 1 concurrency
Madison	Jackson	66.7	107.3	US 70 west / US 412 Bus. west (SR 1 west/SR 20 west) – Jackson	Eastern end of wrong-way US 70/SR 1 concurrency; eastern terminus of US 412 Bus; western end of SR 20 concurrency
Madison	Springbrook	73.4	118.1	SR 152 east (Law Road) to I-40	Western terminus of SR 152
Henderson				SR 459 east to SR 22 – Adamsville	Western terminus of SR 459
Henderson	Lexington	86.1	138.6	SR 104 west (W. Church Street)	Western end of SR 104 concurrency
Henderson	Lexington	86.3	138.9	Bridge over the Beech River	
Henderson	Lexington	87.8	141.3	SR 22 (Broad Street) – Milledgeville, Huntingdon	
Henderson	Lexington	87.9	141.5	SR 104 east / SR 114 north (Natchez Trace Drive)	To Natchez Trace State Park; eastern end of SR 104 concurrency; western end of SR 114 concurrency
Henderson	Chesterfield	95.3	153.4	SR 114 south (Middleburg Road)	Eastern end of SR 114 concurrency
Decatur	Beacon	100.4	161.6	SR 202 south (Beacon Road)	Northern terminus of SR 202
Decatur	Parsons	103.5	166.6	US 641 (Tennessee Avenue/SR 69) – Decaturville, Camden	
Decatur	Perryville	108.1	174.0	SR 100 west – Decaturville	Western end of SR 100 concurrency
Tennessee River		108.9	175.3	Alvin C. York Bridge	
Perry	Cypress Creek	109.9	176.9	SR 438 east (Spring Creek Road) – Mousetail Landing State Park, Lobelville	Western terminus of SR 438
Perry	Linden	121.6	195.7	SR 13 (Squirrel Hollow Drive) – Waynesboro, Lobelville	Provides access to James Tucker Airport
Perry	Linden	121.7– 121.9	195.9– 196.2	Donnie Harold Qualls Memorial Bridge over the Buffalo River	
Perry	Chestnut Grove	124.4	200.2	SR 100 east – Centerville	Eastern end of SR 100 concurrency
Lewis	Hohenwald	138.5	222.9	John A. Baker Airfield (Airport) main entrance	Access road into airport
Lewis	Hohenwald	140.1	225.5	SR 20 east / SR 48 / SR 99 west (Park Street) – Centerville, Waynesboro, Summertown	Eastern end of SR 20 concurrency; western end of SR 99 concurrency
Lewis	Gordonsburg	148.5	239.0	Natchez Trace Parkway	Interchange
Maury	Hampshire	158.0	254.3	SR 166 south (Pisgah Ridge Road) – Mount Pleasant	Northern terminus of SR 166
Maury	Columbia	168.3	270.9	US 43 south (SR 6 south) – Mount Pleasant, Lawrenceburg, Maury County Airport US 412 Bus. east (Hampshire Pike/SR 99 east) – Columbia	Interchange; western end of US 43/SR 6 concurrency; western terminus of US 412 Bus; eastern end of SR 99 concurrency
Maury	Columbia	169.9	273.4	SR 50 (Williamsport Pike) – Centerville, Columbia	Interchange
Maury	Columbia	172.2– 172.4	277.1– 277.5	Industrial Park Road — Columbia	Interchange
Maury	Columbia	173.9	279.9	SR 7 (Santa Fe Pike) – Columbia, Santa Fe, Dickson	Interchange
Maury	Columbia	174.2– 174.4	280.3– 280.7	Rear Admiral Fran McKee Memorial Bridge over the Duck River	
Maury	Columbia	175.3	282.1	US 31 / US 412 Bus. west (Nashville Highway/SR 6 north/SR 99 west) – Columbia, Spring Hill US 43 ends	Northern terminus of US 43; eastern terminus of US 412 Bus; eastern end of SR 6 concurrency; western end of SR 99 concurrency
Maury	Columbia	181.93	292.79	I-65 – Nashville, Huntsville SR 99 east (Bear Creek Pike) – Chapel Hill	I-65 exit 46; eastern terminus of US 412; road continues east as SR 99
1.000 mi = 1.609 km; 1.000 km = 0.621 mi: Concurrency terminus; Incomplete access; Unopened
