= Tennessee State Route 20 =

State highway in Tennessee, United States

State Route 20
- SR 20; primary in red, unsigned in green

Route information
- Maintained by TDOT
- Length: 143.04 mi (230.20 km)
- Existed: October 1, 1923–present

Major junctions
- West end: US 51 / US 412 / SR 211 in Dyersburg
- US 70A / US 79 near Bells; I-40 in Jackson; US 45 Byp. in Jackson; US 45 in Jackson; US 70 in Jackson; US 412 in Hohenwald
- East end: US 43 in Summertown

Location
- Country: United States
- State: Tennessee
- Counties: Dyer, Crockett, Madison, Henderson, Decatur, Perry, Lewis, Lawrence, Maury

Highway system
- Tennessee State Routes; Interstate; US; State
← US 19W	→ SR 21

State Route 20 (SR 20) is a 143.04-mile (230.20 km) long east–west primary state highway that begins in Dyersburg and ends near Summertown. SR 20 is unsigned and concurrent with U.S. Route 412 (US 412) for its entire length, except for a short section between Hohenwald and Summertown. Along its route, SR 20 traverses parts of both Middle Tennessee and West Tennessee.

== Route description ==
=== Dyer County ===
SR 20 begins in Dyer County in Dyersburg as the unsigned companion route of US 412 at an expansive parclo interchange with US 51/US 412/SR 3/SR 211. US 412/SR 20 go south as a 4-lane freeway to a diamond interchange with SR 104, where it downgrades to a 4-lane expressway just before crossing the North Fork of the Forked Deer River and leaving Dyersburg. They then curve to the southeast as they pass through farmland and have a diamond interchange with SR 210. US 412/SR 20 continue southeast and cross into Crockett County.

=== Crockett County ===
US 412/SR 20 continue through farmland to the town of Friendship, to have a RIRO interchange with SR 189. They continue southeast to have a quadrant interchange with SR 152 just before entering Alamo. US 412/SR 20 then have a parclo interchange with SR 188 before having a partial interchange with N Cavalier Drive (Old US 412/SR 20 and starting on a bypass around the west side of town. They then have a diamond interchange with SR 54/SR 88 before passing just west of downtown and then having a partial interchange with S Cavalier Drive (Old US 412/SR 20). US 412/SR 20 then leave Alamo and continue southeast through farmland and have a quadrant interchange with SR 88 before entering Bells and coming to a cloverleaf interchange with US 70A/US 79/SR 76, just after bypassing downtown to the northern and eastern sides. It then has a parclo interchange with the eastern end of SR 88 before leaving Bells and continuing southeast through farmland to cross into Madison County.

=== Madison County ===
The highway then passes through some hills before entering Jackson and coming to a diamond interchange with Country Club Lane, approximately one mile (1.6 km) from its parclo interchange with I-40 (exit 79). At I-40, SR 20 remains hidden and follows US 412 Bus. through the city while US 412 is concurrent with I-40 between exits 79 and 87. US 412 Bus./SR 20 follows Hollywood Drive as a four-lane undivided highway, passing by several businesses and homes before coming to an intersection with North Parkway, where they make a left to follow that street through several neighborhoods just before an intersection with US 45 Byp./SR 186. US 412 Bus./SR 20 continues east through several more neighborhoods to an intersection with US 45/SR 5 in the middle of a major shopping district. They then continue through more neighborhoods and pass through an industrial area before coming to an intersection with US 70/SR 1, where they make a left to become concurrent with that highway. They then travel through some suburbs and pass by an industrial park before coming to an intersection with US 412 (just south of its interchange with I-40 (exit 87)), where US 412 Bus. ends and SR 20 splits from US 70/SR 1 as it becomes concurrent with US 412 again as the pair exit Jackson as a two-lane highway and continue east. The entire route of SR 20 through the city of Jackson is at least four lanes wide. US 412/SR 20 continue east through farmland to the community of Springbrook, where it widens to a four-lane divided highway and has an intersection with SR 152 just before entering Henderson County.

=== Henderson County ===
US 412/SR 20 continue east through countryside and farmland and pass through Crucifer before narrowing to a 4-lane undivided shortly before entering Lexington. They then pass by several businesses and become concurrent with SR 104 before crossing over the Beech River, passing just south of the dam for Beech Lake. The highway continues past several more businesses before entering downtown and coming to an intersection with SR 22, where SR 104 splits off and goes southeast. US 412/SR 20 continues through some neighborhoods before leaving Lexington and continuing east through farmland and countryside as a 4-lane divided highway. The highway then narrows to a 4-lane undivided highway before passing through the communities of Chesterfield, where it has an intersection with SR 114, and Darden. The highway then crosses into Decatur County.

=== Decatur County ===
US 412/SR 20 then have an intersection with SR 202 before continuing east and entering Parsons. They pass by a neighborhood before narrowing to 2-lanes and entering downtown, where they have an intersection with US 641/SR 69. They continue through downtown before leaving Parsons as a 2-lane highway. US 412/SR 20 continue through largely wooded countryside before coming to Perryville and becoming concurrent with SR 100, just before crossing a bridge over the Tennessee River and entering Perry County.

=== Perry County ===
The highway has an intersection SR 438 just south of Mousetail Landing State Park before passing through some hills before entering Linden. They pass through downtown before having an intersection with SR 13. The highway then leaves Linden after crossing a bridge over the Buffalo River and continues east to the community of Chestnut Grove, where SR 100 splits off at a Y-Intersection and goes northeast. They then pass through hilly and wooded areas as they cross into Lewis County.

=== Lewis County ===
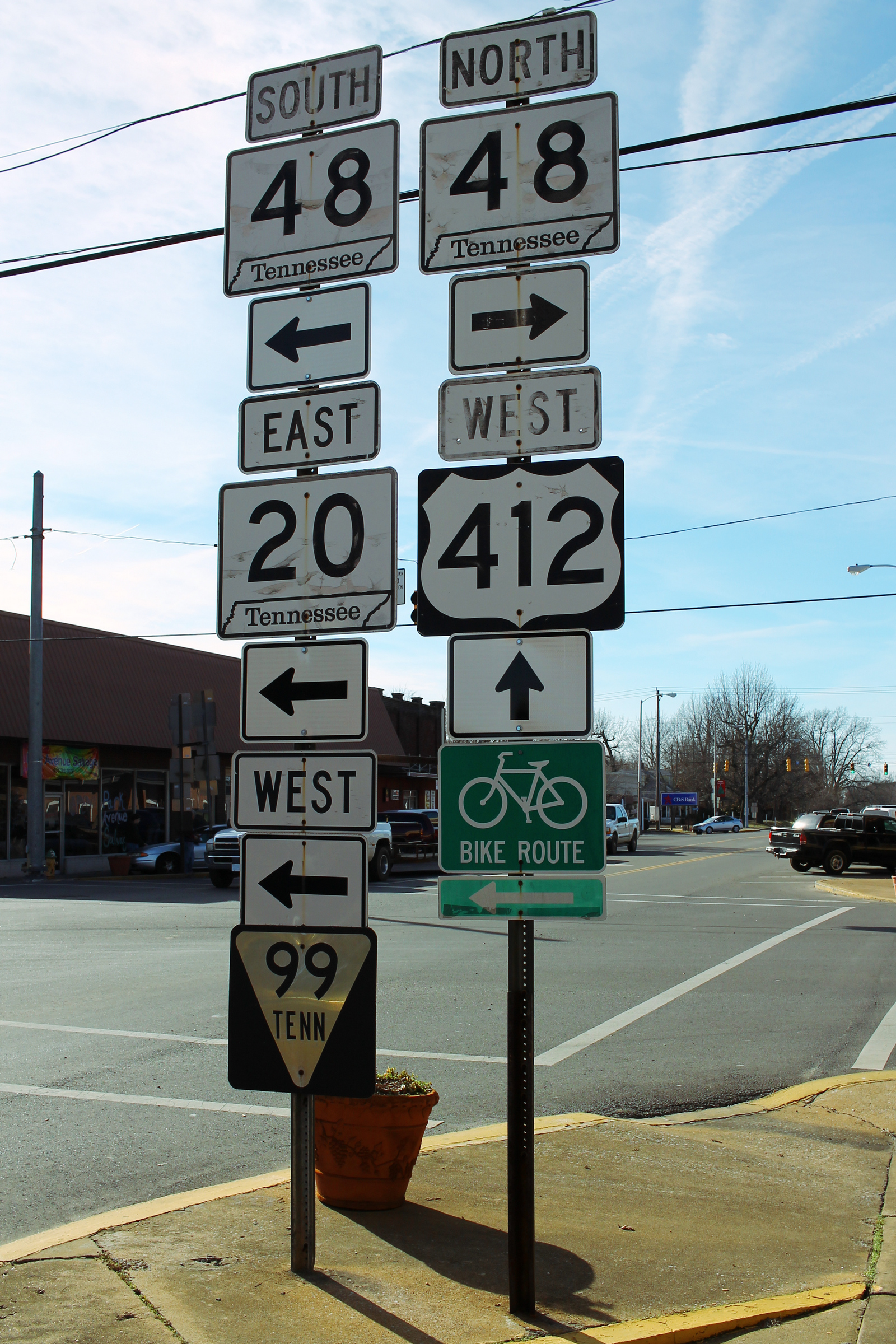
SR 20 is marked alongside other highways in Hohenwald.

US 412/SR 20 continues east through hilly and wooded terrain to enter farmland, just before entering the town of Hohenwald. The highway passes by some homes and businesses before entering downtown and coming to an intersection with SR 48 and SR 99, where SR 20 leaves US 412 and becomes signed for the first time as it goes south along SR 48/SR 99. A short distance later, after leaving downtown, SR 20 and SR 99 split off from SR 48 and turn east before curving to the south and to a Y-intersection where SR 99 splits off and turns southwest. SR 20 then curves eastward and leaves Hohenwald as a lone 2-lane highway. It then passes through farmland and wooded areas and has an interchange with the Natchez Trace Parkway before entering Lawrence County.

=== Lawrence and Maury Counties ===
SR 20 continues east through farmland before entering Summertown and becoming concurrent with SR 240 via a Y-intersection. They then pass through the center of town before SR 240 splits off and SR 20 crosses into Maury County, shortly before the highway comes to an end at an intersection with US 43/SR 6.

== Additional Information ==
SR 20 is designated as part of the Delta Development Highway System throughout West Tennessee and carries a Tennessee Scenic Parkway designation from Lexington to Linden and again from Hohenwald to Summertown.

== History ==
Prior to 1981 and dating back as far as 1958, SR 20 at its western end extended beyond Dyersburg following what is now SR 210, US 51, SR 211, and SR 104 to Heloise, Tennessee, on the Mississippi River in extreme western Dyer County.

== Future ==
Tennessee Department of Transportation currently has plans to expand existing SR 20 from two-lane to four-lane or completely reconstruct the route on a new alignment from I-40 in Madison County to the Tennessee River near Perryville.

== Major intersections ==
County	Location	mi	km	Destinations	Notes
Dyer	Dyersburg	0.00	0.00	US 412 west / US 51 / SR 211 north (SR 3/Saint John Avenue)	Western terminus of SR 20; Hidden SR 20 begins overlapped with US 412; southern terminus of SR 211
Dyer	Dyersburg	3.01	4.84	SR 104 (E Court Street) – Dyersburg, Trenton	Interchange
Dyer	Bonicord	7.40	11.91	SR 210 south (Old Highway 20) – Fowlkes, Dyersburg	Northern terminus of SR 210; interchange
Crockett	Friendship	15.55	25.03	SR 189 south – Friendship, Maury City	Northern terminus of SR 189; interchange
Crockett	Cairo	19.50	31.38	SR 152 east – Humboldt	Western terminus of SR 152; interchange
Crockett	Cairo	21.11	33.97	SR 188 – Brownsville	Interchange
Crockett	Alamo			Cavalier Drive - Alamo	Interchange; eastbound exit and westbound entrance
Crockett	Alamo	23.39	37.64	SR 54 / SR 88 – Maury City, Alamo	Interchange
Crockett	Alamo			Cavalier Drive - Alamo	Interchange; westbound exit and eastbound entrance
Crockett	Bells	27.54	44.32	SR 88 – Alamo, Bells	Interchange
Crockett	Bells	29.83	48.01	US 70A / US 79 (High Street/SR 76) – Brownsville, Humboldt	Interchange
Crockett	Bells	30.82	49.60	SR 88 west (Old Jackson Road) – Bells	Eastern terminus of SR 88; interchange
Madison	Jackson			Country Club Lane	Interchange
Madison	Jackson	41.85	67.35	US 412 Bus. begins / I-40 / US 412 east – Memphis, Nashville	Eastern end of US 412 overlap; Hidden SR 20 continues east through Jackson overlapped with US 412 Business; I-40 exit 79
Madison	Jackson	43.65	70.25	US 45 Byp. (Keith Short Bypass/SR 186)	
Madison	Jackson	44.98	72.39	US 45 (Highland Avenue/SR 5)	
Madison	Jackson	48.08	77.38	US 70 west (Whitehall Street/SR 1)	Begin overlap with US 70/SR 1
Madison	Jackson	50.86	81.85	US 70 east / US 412 west (SR 1) to I-40	Overlap with US 70/SR 1 ends; US 412 Business Ends; Hidden SR 20 resumes overlap with US 412
Madison	Springbrook	57.50	92.54	SR 152 east (Law Road) to I-40	Western terminus of SR 152
Henderson	Lexington	70.15	112.90	SR 104 west (W Church Street)	Overlap with SR 104 begins
Henderson	Lexington	71.84	115.62	SR 22 (Broad Street) – Milledgeville, Huntingdon	
Henderson	Lexington	72.03	115.92	SR 104 east / SR 114 north (Natchez Trace Drive)	To Natchez Trace State Park; Overlap with SR 104 ends and overlap with SR 114 begins
Henderson	Chesterfield	79.40	127.78	SR 114 south (Middleburg Road)	Overlap with SR 114 ends
Decatur	Beacon	84.38	135.80	SR 202 south (Beacon Road)	Northern terminus of SR 202
Decatur	Parsons	87.55	140.90	US 641 (Tennessee Avenue/SR 69) – Decaturville, Camden	
Decatur	Perryville	91.88	147.87	SR 100 west – Decaturville	Overlap with SR 100 begins
Perry	Cypress Creek	93.94	151.18	SR 438 east (Spring Creek Road) – Mousetail Landing State Park, Lobelville	Western terminus of SR 438
Perry	Linden			SR 13 (Squirrel Hollow Drive) – Waynesboro, Lobelville	
Perry	Chestnut Grove	108.23	174.18	SR 100 east – Centerville	Overlap with SR 100 ends
Lewis	Hohenwald	123.88	199.37	US 412 east (E Main Street/SR 99 east) / SR 48 north (N Park Street) – Columbia, Centerville	US 412 overlap ends; Brief overlap with SR 48 & SR 99 begins
Lewis	Hohenwald	124.30	200.04	SR 48 south (S Park Street) – Waynesboro	Overlap with SR 48 ends
Lewis	Hohenwald	124.58	200.49	SR 99 west (Buffalo Road) – Waynesboro	Overlap with SR 99 ends; SR 20 becomes a fully signed route
Lewis		130.74	210.41	Natchez Trace Parkway	Interchange via access road
Lawrence	Summertown	141.02	226.95	SR 240 south (Turnpike)	Overlap with SR 240 Begins
Lawrence	Summertown	142.08	228.66	SR 240 north (Monument Road)	Overlap with SR 240 ends
Maury	Summertown	143.04	230.20	US 43 (Lawrenceburg Highway/SR 6) – Lawrenceburg, Columbia	Eastern terminus of SR 20
1.000 mi = 1.609 km; 1.000 km = 0.621 mi: Concurrency terminus

== See also ==
- U.S. Route 412
