= Tennessee State Route 152 =

State highway in Tennessee

State Route 152
- SR 152 highlighted in red

Route information
- Maintained by TDOT
- Length: 36.88 mi (59.35 km)

Major junctions
- West end: US 412 in Cairo
- US 70A / US 79 in Humboldt; US 45W in Humboldt; US 45E in Medina; US 70 in Spring Creek; I-40 near Jackson
- East end: US 412 near Jackson

Location
- Country: United States
- State: Tennessee
- Counties: Crockett, Gibson, Madison

Highway system
- Tennessee State Routes; Interstate; US; State
← SR 151	→ SR 153

State Route 152 (SR 152) is a 36.88-mile-long (59.35 km) east-west state highway traversing the flat farmland of West Tennessee.

== Route description ==
SR 152 begins in Crockett County in Cairo at an interchange with US 412/SR 20, where the road continues west 1.75 miles (2.82 km) as Reynolds Road to SR 189. Some maps erroneously label this as Nichols Road, even though this is incorrect. It goes east to have an intersection with SR 188 before leaving the community and continuing through rural areas, where it has an intersection with SR 54, before crossing into Gibson County. The highway crosses over the Middle Fork of the Forked Deer River to enter Humboldt along McLin Street to have an intersection with US 70A Bypass/US 79 Bypass/SR 366. It passes through neighborhoods as it turns south onto N 9th Avenue before turning east along Mitchell Street to have an intersection with US 45W Business/SR 5 (N Central Avenue). It continues east through neighborhoods to have an intersection with US 70A/US 79/SR 76 (Eastend Drive) before having an intersection with US 45W/SR 366. The highway now leaves Humboldt and passes through rural areas to have an intersection with SR 186 before entering Medina and having an intersection with US 45E/SR 43. SR 152 passes through downtown along W Church Avenue, then Main Street, and finally E Foster Avenue, before leaving Medina and continuing east through farmland to cross into Madison County. It turns southeast to cross the Middle Fork of the Forked Deer River, for a second time, to pass through Spring Creek, where it has a short 70-foot (21 m) concurrency with US 70/SR 1, before turning completely south and having an interchange with I-40 (Exit 93). The highway then comes to an end shortly afterwards at an intersection with US 412/SR 20. The entire route of SR 152 is a two-lane highway.

== Major intersections ==
County	Location	mi	km	Destinations	Notes
Crockett	Cairo	0.0– 0.3	0.0– 0.48	US 412 (SR 20) – Jackson, Dyersburg; Reynolds Road to SR 189 – Maury City	Western terminus; interchange; road continues west as Reynolds Road
Crockett	Cairo	0.9	1.4	SR 188 – Alamo, Maury City, Eaton, Yorkville	
Crockett		6.0	9.7	SR 54 – Alamo, Trenton	
Gibson		12.8	20.6	Bridge over the Middle Fork of the Forked Deer River	
Gibson	Humboldt	14.3	23.0	US 70A Byp. / US 79 Byp. (SR 366) – Gadsden, Gibson	
Gibson	Humboldt	15.6	25.1	US 45W Bus. (N Central Avenue/SR 5)	
Gibson	Humboldt	16.1	25.9	US 70A / US 79 (Eastend Drive/SR 76) – Gadsden, Gibson	
Gibson	Humboldt	17.1	27.5	US 45W (Highway 45W Bypass/SR 366) – Trenton, Three Way, Jackson	
Gibson		21.0	33.8	SR 186 – Gibson, Three Way	
Gibson	Medina	23.9	38.5	US 45E (SR 43) – Jackson, Three Way, Milan	
Madison		29.6– 29.7	47.6– 47.8	Bridge over the Middle Fork of the Forked Deer River	
Madison	Spring Creek	31.3	50.4	US 70 (SR 1) – Jackson, Huntingdon	Short 70 feet concurrency with US 70/SR 1
Madison		36.3– 36.4	58.4– 58.6	I-40 – Memphis, Nashville	I-40 exit 93
Madison		36.88	59.35	US 412 (SR 20) – Jackson, Lexington	Eastern terminus
1.000 mi = 1.609 km; 1.000 km = 0.621 mi: Concurrency terminus
