= Tennessee State Route 104 =

State highway in Tennessee, United States

State Route 104
- TN 104; primary in red, secondary in blue, unsigned in light green, Dyersburg truck route in dark green

Route information
- Maintained by TDOT
- Length: 114.43 mi (184.16 km)

Major junctions
- West end: Dead end at Mississippi River in rural Dyer County
- US 51 in Dyersburg; US 412 in Dyersburg; SR 457 near Trenton; US 45W / SR 54 / SR 77 in Trenton; US 45E in Milan; US 70A / US 79 in Milan; US 70 in Cedar Grove; I-40 near Lexington; US 412 / SR 22 / SR 114 in Lexington; SR 100 in Reagan
- East end: SR 69 in Saltillo

Location
- Country: United States
- State: Tennessee
- Counties: Dyer, Gibson, Carroll, Henderson, Hardin

Highway system
- Tennessee State Routes; Interstate; US; State
| ← SR 103 | → SR 105 |

State Route 104 (SR 104) is a 114.43-mile-long (184.16 km) east–west state highway in West Tennessee.

== Route description ==
=== Dyer County ===
SR 104 begins as a secondary highway in Dyer County on the banks of the Mississippi River. It goes east to have an intersection with SR 181 (Great River Road) before crossing over the Obion River to pass through Finley, where it has an intersection with SR 182. The highway now enters Dyersburg and passes through industrial areas before having an intersection with US 51/SR 3 (Highway 51 Bypass). SR 104 then passes through neighborhoods before entering downtown along Forrest Street to have an intersection with SR 78 (Lake Road), where it becomes McGaughey Street. It then becomes concurrent with US 51 Bus./SR 211 (Troy Avenue) for a short distance as it turns south along N Main Avenue before splitting off and going east along E Court Street. The highway passes through more neighborhoods before coming to an interchange with US 412/SR 20, where SR 104 leaves Dyersburg and becomes a primary highway. SR 104 passes through RoEllen before crossing into Gibson County via a bridge over the North Fork of the Forked Deer River. The entire route of SR 104 in Dyer County is a two-lane highway.

=== Gibson County ===
SR 104 then passes through Eaton, where it has an intersection with SR 188, before widening to a 4-lane divided highway as it continues east through farmland to come to an intersection with SR 457, where it narrows to 2-lanes and enters Trenton. It passes through downtown along Eaton Street, where it has an intersection with SR 367, before coming to an intersection with US 45W/SR 43/SR 54/SR 77. SR 104 now becomes concurrent with SR 77, where SR 104 becomes unsigned, and they leave Trenton and cross another bridge over the North Fork of the Forked Deer River. SR 77/SR 104 pass by Gibson County Airport before entering Milan as N Main Street. They pass through neighborhoods before making a left onto Front Street to come to an intersection and become concurrent with US 45E/SR 43 (S 1st Street), where SR 77 also becomes unsigned. They pass through downtown as a 4-lane undivided highway to come to an intersection with US 70A/US 79/SR 76 (Van Hook Street), where SR 77 splits off follows that highway. SR 104 splits off from US 45E/SR 43 a short distance later along Ellington Drive as a signed secondary highway. SR 104 goes east as a 2-lane highway to leave Milan and cross into Carroll County.

=== Carroll County ===
SR 104 passes through rural and slightly hilly terrain as it has a short concurrency with SR 220 before coming to an intersection with US 70/SR 1. It turns southeast, along US 70/SR 1, to pass through Cedar Grove, where it has another intersection with SR 220 before SR 104 splits off and goes southeast to cross into Henderson County.

=== Henderson and Hardin Counties ===
SR 104 becomes very curvy as it passes through hilly terrain to have an interchange with I-40 (Exit 101). It then continues southeast through farmland to enter Lexington and pass along the western shore of Beech Lake to come to an intersection and become concurrent with US 412/SR 20 (W Church Street). They pass just south of the Beech River Dam and cross over the Beech River as a 4-lane undivided highway to pass through a business district before entering downtown to have an intersection with SR 22 (Broad Street) before SR 104 splits off at an intersection with SR 114 (Natchez Trace Drive). The highway then makes a left onto S Main Street and heads southeast to have another crossing of the Beech River to leave Lexington as a 2-lane highway to pass through hilly and wooded areas. SR 104 then passes through Reagan, where it has an intersection with SR 100, before passing through the town of Sardis, where it has a concurrency with SR 201 and an intersection with SR 421. The highway continues southeast to cross into Hardin County and come to an end at an intersection with SR 69 at the western edge of Saltillo.

== Major intersections ==
| County | Location | mi | km | Destinations | Notes |
|---|---|---|---|---|---|
| Dyer | | 0.0 | 0.0 | Dead end at the Mississippi River | Western terminus; SR 104 begins as a secondary highway |
| Dyer | | | | SR 181 (Great River Road) to I-155 – Ridgely, Halls | |
| Dyer | | | | Bridge over the Obion River | |
| Dyer | Finley | | | SR 182 north (Lenox Nauvoo Road) to I-155 – Lenox | Southern terminus of SR 182 |
| Dyer | Dyersburg | | | US 51 (Highway 51 Bypass/SR 3) to I-155 – Halls, Union City | |
| Dyer | Dyersburg | | | SR 78 north (Lake Road) to I-155 – Ridgely | Southern terminus of SR 78 |
| Dyer | Dyersburg | | | US 51 Bus. north (Troy Avenue/SR 211 north) | Western end of US 51 Bus./SR 211 concurrency |
| Dyer | Dyersburg | | | US 51 Bus. south (S Main Avenue/SR 211 south) | Eastern end of US 51 Bus./SR 211 concurrency |
| Dyer | Dyersburg | | | US 412 (SR 20) – Jackson, Union City | Interchange; SR 104 turns primary |
| North Fork of the Forked Deer River | | | | Bridge over the North Fork of the Forked Deer River | |
| Gibson | Eaton | | | SR 188 (Riverside Yorkville Road) – Yorkville, Maury City | |
| Gibson | | | | SR 457 east – Humboldt | Western terminus of SR 457; bypass of Trenton |
| Gibson | Trenton | | | SR 367 (College Street) | |
| Gibson | Trenton | | | US 45W / SR 54 / SR 77 west (Highway 45 Bypass/SR 5) – Dyer, Bradford, Alamo, Humboldt | Western end of SR 77 concurrency; SR 104 becomes unsigned |
| Gibson | Trenton | | | Bridge over the North Fork of the Forked Deer River | |
| Gibson | Milan | | | US 45E north (S 1st Street/SR 43 north) – Bradford | Western end of US 45E/SR 43 concurrency |
| Gibson | Milan | | | US 70A / US 79 (Van Hook Street/SR 76/SR 77 east) – Gibson, Atwood | Eastern end of SR 77 concurrency |
| Gibson | Milan | | | US 45E south (S 1st Street/SR 43 south) – Medina | Eastern end of US 45E/SR 43 concurrency; SR 104 becomes signed as secondary highway |
| Carroll | | | | SR 220 south – Lavinia | Western end of SR 220 concurrency |
| Carroll | | | | SR 220 north – Atwood | Eastern end of SR 220 concurrency |
| Carroll | | | | US 70 east (SR 1 east) – Huntingdon | Western end of wrong-way US 70/SR 1 concurrency |
| Carroll | Cedar Grove | | | SR 220 north – Lavinia | Southern terminus of SR 220 |
| Carroll | Cedar Grove | | | US 70 west (SR 1 west) – Jackson | Eastern end of wrong-way US 70/SR 1 concurrency |
| Henderson | | | | I-40 – Memphis, Jackson | I-40 exit 101 |
| Henderson | Lexington | | | US 412 west (W Church Street/SR 20 west) – Jackson | Western end of US 412/SR 20 concurrency |
| Henderson | Lexington | | | Bridge over the Beech River | |
| Henderson | Lexington | | | SR 22 (Broad Street) – Milledgeville, Parkers Crossroads | |
| Henderson | Lexington | | | US 412 east / SR 114 south (E Church Street/SR 20 east) – Chesterfield, Parsons SR 114 north (Natchez Trace Drive) – Natchez Trace State Park | Eastern end of US 412/SR 20 concurrency |
| Henderson | Lexington | | | Bridge over the Beech River | |
| Henderson | Reagan | | | SR 100 – Henderson, Scotts Hill | |
| Henderson | Sardis | | | SR 201 north (Sardis Scotts Hill Road) – Scotts Hill | Western end of SR 201 concurrency |
| Henderson | Sardis | | | SR 201 south (Henderson Road) | Eastern end of SR 201 concurrency |
| Henderson | Sardis | | | SR 421 south (Hinkle Road) – Lebanon | Northern terminus of SR 421 |
| Hardin | Saltillo | 114.43 | 184.16 | SR 69 – Milledgeville, Bath Springs | Eastern terminus; SR 104 ends as a secondary highway |
1.000 mi = 1.609 km; 1.000 km = 0.621 mi: Concurrency terminus

== See also ==
- List of state routes in Tennessee
- List of highways numbered 104
