= Tennessee State Route 188 =

State highway in Tennessee, United States

State Route 188
- SR 188 highlighted in red

Route information
- Maintained by TDOT
- Length: 22.2 mi (35.7 km)
- Existed: July 1, 1983–present

Major junctions
- South end: SR 54 / SR 88 between Maury City and Alamo
- US 412 near Alamo; SR 104 in Eaton
- North end: SR 77 in Yorkville

Location
- Country: United States
- State: Tennessee
- Counties: Crockett, Gibson

Highway system
- Tennessee State Routes; Interstate; US; State
← SR 187	→ SR 189

State Route 188 (SR 188) is a 22.2-mile-long (35.7 km) north–south state highway in West Tennessee, connecting the towns of Maury City and Alamo with Yorkville via Crockett Mills and Eaton.

== Route description ==
SR 188 begins in Crockett County at an intersection with SR 54 and SR 88, approximately halfway between the towns of Maury City and Alamo. It heads north through farmland and rural areas to an interchange with US 412 (SR 20) and an intersection with SR 152 in Cairo before passing through Crockett Mills. Shortly afterward, the highway crosses the Middle Fork of the Forked Deer River into Gibson County. SR 188 then passes through Eaton, which has an intersection with SR 104. It continues north to cross the North Fork of the Forked Deer River and pass through rural areas before entering Yorkville, where SR 188 comes to an end at an intersection with SR 77. The entire route of SR 188 is a two-lane highway.

== Major intersections ==
County	Location	mi	km	Destinations	Notes
Crockett		0.0	0.0	SR 54 / SR 88 – Maury City, Brownsville, Alamo	Southern terminus
Crockett	Cairo			US 412 (SR 20) – Dyersburg, Jackson	Interchange
Crockett	Cairo			SR 152 (Nichols Road) – Maury City, Humboldt	
Middle Fork of the Forked Deer River				Bridge over the Middle Fork of the Forked Deer River	
Gibson	Eaton			SR 104 (Dyersburg Highway) – Dyersburg, Trenton	
Gibson				Bridge over the North Fork of the Forked Deer River	
Gibson	Yorkville	22.2	35.7	SR 77 (Newbern Highway/Dyer Highway) – Newbern, Dyer	Northern terminus
1.000 mi = 1.609 km; 1.000 km = 0.621 mi
