= Tennessee State Route 88 =

State highway in Tennessee, United States

State Route 88
- SR 88 highlighted in red

Route information
- Maintained by TDOT
- Length: 44.78 mi (72.07 km)

Major junctions
- West end: Mississippi River dead end in Chickasaw National Wildlife Refuge near Hales Point
- US 51 in Halls; US 412 in Alamo; US 70A / US 79 in Bells
- East end: US 412 in Bells

Location
- Country: United States
- State: Tennessee
- Counties: Lauderdale, Crockett

Highway system
- Tennessee State Routes; Interstate; US; State
← SR 87	→ SR 89

State Route 88 (SR 88) is a west–east state highway in West Tennessee. The 44.78 miles (72.07 km) route traverses Lauderdale and Crockett Counties.

== Route description ==
=== Lauderdale County ===
SR 88 begins at a dead end overlooking the Mississippi River within Chickasaw National Wildlife Refuge. It intersects SR 181 at Hales Point. SR 88 heads east, and turns right onto an old alignment of US 51 (SR 3) after intersecting the current alignment near Halls. SR 88 has junctions with State Routes 210 and 209 before turning eastward once again at Gates.

=== Crockett County ===
SR 88 then traverses the town of Maury City and Alamo. SR 88 in Alamo and Bells, including a concurrency with SR 54, runs on an old alignment with US 412 (SR 20), the southernmost intersection of which is the eastern terminus of SR 88.

== History ==
At one time, SR 88 once connected with Arkansas Highway 18 into Mississippi County, Arkansas, via a ferry on the Mississippi River. It has long since been decommissioned.

== Major intersections ==
County	Location	mi	km	Destinations	Notes
Lauderdale	Chickasaw National Wildlife Refuge	0.0	0.0	Dead end at the Mississippi River	Western terminus
Lauderdale	Hales Point			SR 181 north / Great River Road	Southern terminus of SR 181; western end of Great River Road concurrency
Lauderdale	Halls			US 51 (SR 3) / Great River Road south – Memphis, Dyersburg	Interchange; eastern end of Great River Road concurrency
Lauderdale	Halls			SR 210 north (N Church Street) – Fowlkes	Southern terminus of SR 210; Old US 51
Lauderdale	Gates			SR 180 north / SR 209 south (2nd Street) – Ripley	Northern terminus of SR 209; western end of SR 180 concurrency; Old US 51
Lauderdale				SR 180 south (Forked Deer Road) – Nutbush	Eastern end of SR 180 concurrency
Crockett	Maury City			SR 189 north – Friendship	Southern terminus of SR 189
Crockett	Maury City			SR 54 west / SR 188 north – Brownsville, Yorkville	Southern terminus of SR 188; western end of SR 54 concurrency
Crockett	Alamo			US 412 (SR 20) – Dyersburg, Jackson	Interchange
Crockett	Alamo			SR 54 east (N Bells Street) / SR 221 east (E Church Street) – Trenton, Gadsden	Eastern end of SR 54 concurrency; western terminus of SR 221
Crockett	Bells			US 412 (SR 20) – Dyersburg, Jackson	Interchange
Crockett	Bells			US 70A / US 79 (High Street/SR 76) – Brownsville, Humboldt	
Crockett	Bells	44.78	72.07	US 412 (SR 20) – Jackson, Dyersburg	Interchange; eastern terminus; road continues east as Old Jackson Road (Former US 412)
1.000 mi = 1.609 km; 1.000 km = 0.621 mi: Concurrency terminus
