= Tennessee State Route 189 =

State highway in Tennessee, United States

State Route 189
- SR 189 highlighted in red

Route information
- Maintained by TDOT
- Length: 5.5 mi (8.9 km)
- Existed: July 1, 1983–present

Major junctions
- South end: SR 88 in Maury City
- North end: US 412 in Friendship

Location
- Country: United States
- State: Tennessee
- Counties: Crockett

Highway system
- Tennessee State Routes; Interstate; US; State
| ← SR 188 | → SR 190 |

State Route 189 (SR 189) is a short 5.5-mile-long (8.9 km) north–south state highway in Crockett County, Tennessee, connecting the towns of Maury City and Friendship.

== Route description ==
SR 189 begins at a Y-intersection with SR 88 in the eastern part of Maury City. It passes through neighborhoods as it heads northwest, then north, to bypass downtown. The highway then leaves Maury City and heads through farmland and rural areas to have an intersection with Reynolds Road, a connector to SR 152. SR 189 continues north through farmland to enter the Friendship city limits, where it comes to an end at an interchange with US 412/SR 20. The highway continues north into downtown, and beyond, as Highway 189, even though this is not maintained by TDOT as SR 189. The entire route of SR 189 is a two-lane highway.

== History ==
SR 189 follows the former alignment of US 412/SR 20 between Maury City and Friendship prior to the four-lane divided highway being built.

== Major intersections ==
The entire route is in Crockett County.

| Location | mi | km | Destinations | Notes |
|---|---|---|---|---|
| Maury City | 0.0 | 0.0 | SR 88 – Gates, Alamo | Southern terminus; Old US 412/SR 20 follows SR 88 east |
| | 2.1 | 3.4 | Reynolds Road to SR 152 – Humboldt | Connector to western terminus of SR 152 |
| Friendship | 5.5 | 8.9 | US 412 (SR 20) – Dyersburg, Jackson; Highway 189 - Downtown Friendship | Interchange; northern terminus; Old US 412/SR 20 follows Highway 189 |
1.000 mi = 1.609 km; 1.000 km = 0.621 mi
