= Tennessee State Route 210 =

State highway in Tennessee, United States

State Route 210
- SR 210 highlighted in red

Route information
- Maintained by TDOT
- Length: 10.10 mi (16.25 km)
- Existed: July 1, 1983–present

Major junctions
- South end: SR 88 in Halls
- North end: US 412 near Tigrett

Location
- Country: United States
- State: Tennessee
- Counties: Lauderdale, Dyer

Highway system
- Tennessee State Routes; Interstate; US; State
← SR 209	→ SR 211

State Route 210 (SR 210) is a secondary state highway in West Tennessee.

== Route description ==
SR 210 begins in Halls (within Lauderdale County) at an intersection with SR 88, which continues south beyond this intersection. SR 210 travels northerly out of Halls, travelling parallel to the Canadian National Railway toward the Dyer County line. Near the county line, the highway passes near the Arnold Field Airport (formerly Dyersburg Army Air Base) built during World War II. In Dyer County, this highway continues north through bottomland until reaches the small community of Fowlkes. In Fowlkes, SR 210 comes to a 4-way intersection, about 500 feet away from US 51/SR 3 and continues east traversing farmland and rolling hills until terminating at US 412/SR 20. Even though the SR 210 designation ends at US 412, the highway actually continues on as Old Highway 20. Mile Markers on this highway reset to 0 at the Lauderdale–Dyer County Line.

== History ==
SR 210 from its intersection with SR 88 in Halls to mile marker 3.25 (above-mentioned 4-way intersection) in Fowlkes represents the historic alignment of US 51/SR 3. From mile marker 3.25 to mile marker 6.50 in Dyer County represents the historic alignment of SR 20.

== Major intersections ==
County	Location	mi	km	Destinations	Notes
Lauderdale	Halls	0.00	0.00	SR 88 (Church Street/Tigrett Street) – Gates, Hales Point	Southern terminus
Dyer	Fowlkes			Old Highway 20 To; US 51 (SR 3) – Dyersburg, Ripley	
Dyer		10.10	16.25	US 412 (SR 20) – Dyersburg, Jackson	Northern terminus; Interchange
1.000 mi = 1.609 km; 1.000 km = 0.621 mi
