= Cairo, Tennessee =

Cairo, Tennessee may refer to the following places:

- Cairo, Crockett County, Tennessee, an unincorporated community
- Cairo, Sumner County, Tennessee, an unincorporated community
