= Forked Deer River =

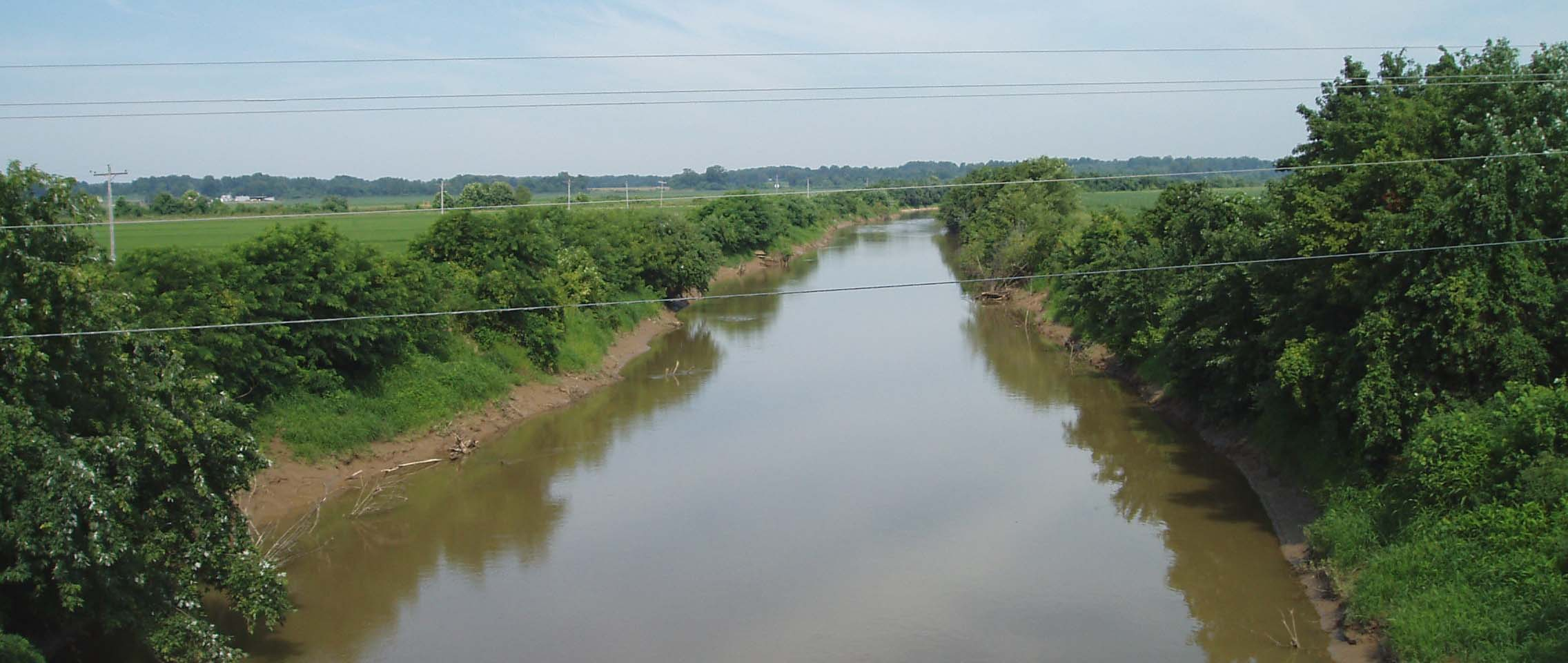
- The South Fork of the Forked Deer River near Halls, Tennessee

Location
- Country: United States
- State: Tennessee

Physical characteristics
- Source
  - coordinates: 35°59′51″N 89°26′08″W
- Mouth
  - location: Obion River, Mississippi River
  - coordinates: 35°55′42″N 89°35′12″W
  - elevation: 230 ft (70 m)

The Forked Deer River system is the main drainage of the central portion of West Tennessee. Locals pronounce the first word of the river's name with two syllables, as in “Forkéd” (/ˈfɔːrkɪd/).

== History ==
The Forked Deer consists of various streams designated "Forked Deer" and their tributaries. Much of the Forked Deer drainage basin was initially wetlands; however much of this area has been drained and most Forked Deer tributaries have been channelized for agricultural purposes. In the mid-20th century much of this was done under the auspices of the Obion-Forked Deer Basin Authority, a Tennessee state agency. Environmental concerns have led to the cessation of channelization on a widespread basis; the federal government's "no net loss" policy regarding wetlands means that further channelization must be offset by creating new wetlands, called "mitigation lands", elsewhere.

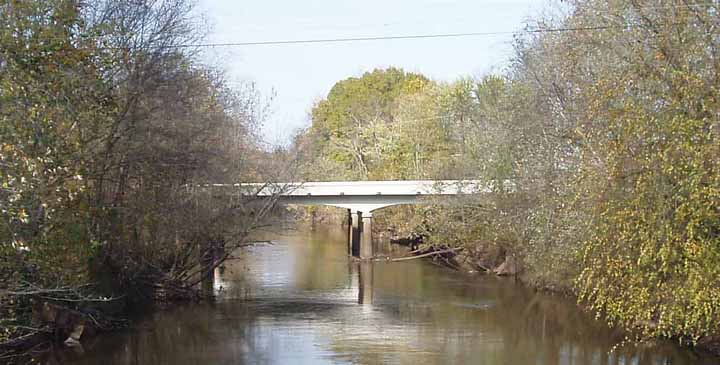
The South Fork of the Forked Deer River at Jackson, Tennessee.

Much of the channelized flow is routed into the Obion River just above the mouth of that river into the Mississippi, other streams related to the system have their own mouths into the Mississippi. In some areas where the historic channels are left in place even after the bulk of the flow has been routed into new ones, the historic channels at times still demonstrate considerable flow, especially after heavy rains.

Local historians record that barges and small riverboats plied the Forked Deer in the early 19th century as far up river as the present location of the city of Jackson. Siltation from agricultural run-off eventually choked the river, and channelization became a major focus of West Tennessee politicians until the 1970s. River cutoffs have left numerous small finger lakes that are popular with local crappie and bass fishers. Otherwise, the river is a slow-moving canal with little scenic appeal.

== Forked Deer River tributaries ==
- North Fork of the Forked Deer River
- Middle Fork of the Forked Deer River
- South Fork of the Forked Deer River

== See also ==
- List of rivers of Tennessee
