= Tennessee State Route 186 =

Highway in Tennessee

State Route 186
- Keith Short Bypass; Gibson Highway
- SR 186, signed in red, unsigned in blue

Route information
- Maintained by TDOT
- Length: 29.5 mi (47.5 km)
- Existed: July 1, 1983–present

Major junctions
- North end: US 45W in Trenton
- US 79 / US 70A in Gibson; US 45 / US 45E / US 45W in Three Way; US 45 / US 45 Byp. in Jackson; I-40 / US 412 in Jackson; US 412 Bus. in Jackson; US 70 in Jackson
- South end: US 45 / US 70 in Jackson

Location
- Country: United States
- State: Tennessee
- Counties: Gibson, Madison

Highway system
- Tennessee State Routes; Interstate; US; State
| ← SR 185 | → SR 187 |

State Route 186 (SR 186) is a state highway in the U.S. state of Tennessee. It runs from Trenton southward to Jackson, passing through the towns of Gibson and Three Way along the way. The southern portion serves as a western bypass for the city of Jackson, which is signed as U.S. Route 45 Bypass (US 45 Bypass).

== U.S. Route 45 Bypass ==
U.S. Route 45 Bypass
- Keith Short Bypass

Route information
- Maintained by TDOT
- Length: 9.9 mi (15.9 km)

Major junctions
- South end: US 45 / US 70 in Jackson
- US 412 Bus. in Jackson; I-40 / US 412 in Jackson
- North end: US 45 in Jackson

Location
- Country: United States
- State: Tennessee
- Counties: Madison County

Highway system
- United States Numbered Highway System; List; Special; Divided; Tennessee State Routes; Interstate; US; State
| ← US 45W | → SR 45 |

U.S. Route 45 Bypass (US 45 Bypass), also known as Keith Short Bypass, is an approximately 10-mile-long (16 km) expressway bypass for US 45 in Jackson, Tennessee. It has the unsigned designation of State Route 186 (SR 186) for its entire length.

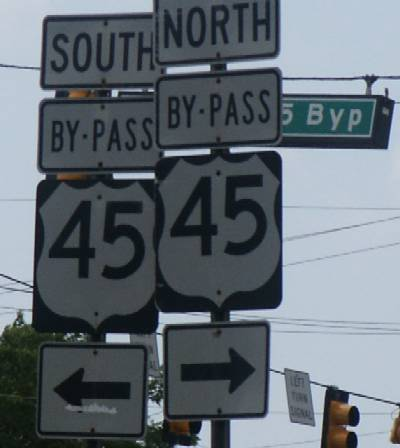
US 45 Bypass signage in Jackson, Tennessee

=== Route description ===
US 45 Bypass (US 45 Byp.) begins at an intersection with US 45 (SR 5/Highland Avenue) and US 70 (SR 1/E Chester Street) in downtown. It goes north as a four-lane divided highway, concurrent with US 70/SR 1, to leave downtown and pass through industrial areas to have a signalized intersection with State Street. It then curves to the north and US 70/SR 1 immediately split off and go east along Airways Boulevard towards McKellar-Sipes Regional Airport. US 45 Byp. continues through suburban neighborhoods to pass through a business district before having an interchange with Hollywood Drive. It then has a signalized intersection with US 412 Bus. (SR 20/North Parkway) before widening to a six-lane at-grade boulevard. It then passes through another business district before having a partial cloverleaf interchange with I-40/US 412 (Exits 80A/B) and reducing to four lanes. Temporarily becoming a limited-access highway, US 45 Byp. immediately has an interchange with Vann Drive and Country Club Lane, where it widens back to six lanes. It passes Union University before having at-grade intersections with Union University Drive/Channing Way, Oil Well Road, Old Humboldt Road, and Ashport Road. US 45 Byp. then comes to an end at an interchange with US 45 (SR 5/N Highland Avenue) and Passmore Lane a short distance later, with unsigned SR 186 continuing north along US 45/SR 5.

=== Major intersections ===
The entire route is in Jackson, Madison County.

| mi | km | Destinations | Notes |
|---|---|---|---|
| 0.0 | 0.0 | US 45 (Highland Avenue/SR 5) / US 70 east (E Chester Avenue/SR 1 east) – Henderson, Huntingdon | Southern terminus of US 45 Bypass and unsigned SR 186; southern end of US 70/SR 1/SR 186 concurrency; south end of expressway |
| 0.9 | 1.4 | State Street | At-grade intersection |
| 1.5 | 2.4 | US 70 west (Airways Boulevard/SR 1 west) – Brownsville | Northern end of US 70/SR 1 concurrency; at-grade intersection; provides access to McKellar-Sipes Regional Airport |
| 3.0– 3.3 | 4.8– 5.3 | Hollywood Drive | Interchange |
| 3.6 | 5.8 | US 412 Bus. (North Parkway/SR 20) | At-grade intersection; north end of expressway |
| 4.7– 5.0 | 7.6– 8.0 | I-40 / US 412 – Memphis, Nashville | I-40/US 412 exit 80 A/B; Cloverleaf interchange; south end of expressway |
| 5.1– 5.5 | 8.2– 8.9 | Vann Drive | Interchange |
| 5.5 | 8.9 | Country Club Lane | Interchange; southbound and northbound exits only |
| 6.1 | 9.8 | Union University Drive/Channing Way - Union University | At-grade intersection |
| 6.6 | 10.6 | Oil Well Road | At-grade intersection |
| 8.0 | 12.9 | Old Humboldt Road | At-grade intersection |
| 8.6 | 13.8 | Ashport Road | At-grade intersection |
| 9.4– 9.9 | 15.1– 15.9 | US 45 (N Highland Avenue/SR 5/SR 186 north) / Passmore Lane – Downtown, Three Way, Humboldt, Milan | Interchange; northern terminus of US 45 Bypass; northern end of SR 186 concurrency |
1.000 mi = 1.609 km; 1.000 km = 0.621 mi: Concurrency terminus; Incomplete access

== Route description ==
=== Gibson County ===
SR 186 begins as a 2-lane secondary highway in Gibson County in Trenton at an intersection with US 45W slightly southeast of downtown and is known as Gibson Highway. It goes southeast through farmland to have an intersection with SR 420 to enter the town of Gibson, where it passes through downtown and has an intersection with US 79/US 70A/SR 76. (It is known as Main Street in Gibson). From here, SR 186 continues south (as just Highway 186) through farmland to have a short concurrency with SR 187 and have an intersection with SR 152 before crossing into Madison County.

=== Madison County ===
SR 186 runs south through farmland to enter Three Way, and has an intersection and becomes concurrent with US 45E/SR 43, where it becomes a four-lane divided highway, as well as an unsigned primary highway. They go southwest and almost immediately come to an interchange with US 45W/SR 5, where SR 43 ends and US 45E and US 45W merge to become US 45, which SR 5 and SR 186 follow south. They continue south as a six-lane divided highway for about one mile (1.6 km) before coming to an interchange with Highland Street, where US 45/SR 5 branch off and SR 186 follows US 45 Byp. US 45 Byp./SR 186 (also known as the Keith Short Bypass) continue south around the western side of the city of Jackson through suburban areas as a 4 to 6 lane expressway, where it has interchanges with Vann Drive, I-40/US 412 (Exit 80A/B), an at-grade intersection with US 412 Bus/SR 20, and an interchange with Hollywood Drive. US 45 Byp/SR 186 then come to an intersection and become concurrent with US 70/SR 1, where it makes a sudden sharp turn to the east to enter downtown, where it becomes an at-grade surface route before US 45 Byp and SR 186 both come to an end at an intersection with US 45/SR 5.

The portion of SR 186 from Three Way to Downtown Jackson is unsigned.

== Future ==
The city of Jackson along with TDOT is planning on re-routing SR 186 (along with US 45 Bypass) away from downtown. Under the current plans, it would extend the bypass south across the South Fork of the Forked Deer River and connect it with US 45 in South Jackson. It would route through traffic away from the central business district and give another crossing for South Jackson commuters.

== Major intersections ==
| County | Location | mi | km | Destinations | Notes |
|---|---|---|---|---|---|
| Gibson | Trenton | 29.5 | 47.5 | US 45W (Highway 45 Bypass/SR 5) – Humboldt, Dyer | Northern terminus; SR 186 begins as a secondary highway |
| Gibson | Gibson | | | SR 420 west – Fruitland | Eastern terminus of SR 420 |
| Gibson | Gibson | | | US 79 / US 70A (SR 76) – Humboldt, Milan | |
| Gibson | | | | SR 187 west | Northern end of SR 187 concurrency |
| Gibson | | | | SR 187 east – Milan | Southern end of SR 187 concurrency |
| Gibson | | | | SR 152 (Medina Humboldt Highway) – Humboldt, Medina | |
| Madison | Three Way | | | US 45E north (SR 43 north) – Medina, Milan | Morthern end of US 45E/SR 43 concurrency; SR 186 becomes an unsigned primary highway |
| Madison | Three Way | | | US 45 begins / US 45W north (SR 5) – Humboldt | Interchange; southern terminus of SR 43; US 45E and US 45W merge to form US 45; northern end of US 45/SR 5 concurrency; north end of expressway |
| Madison | Jackson | | | US 45 Byp. begins (Keith Short Bypass) / US 45 south (N Highland Avenue/SR 5 south) / Passmore Lane – Downtown | Interchange; northern terminus of US 45 Bypass; southern end of US 45/SR 5 concurrency; northern end of US 45 Bypass concurrency |
| Madison | Jackson | | | Ashport Road | At-grade intersection |
| Madison | Jackson | | | Old Humboldt Road | At-grade intersection |
| Madison | Jackson | | | Oil Well Road | At-grade intersection |
| Madison | Jackson | | | Union University Drive/Channing Way - Union University | At-grade intersection |
| Madison | Jackson | | | Country Club Lane | Interchange; southbound and northbound exits only |
| Madison | Jackson | | | Vann Drive | Interchange |
| Madison | Jackson | | | I-40 / US 412 – Memphis, Nashville | I-40/US 412 exit 80 A/B; Cloverleaf interchange; south end of expressway |
| Madison | Jackson | | | US 412 Bus. (North Parkway/SR 20) | At-grade intersection; north end of expressway |
| Madison | Jackson | | | Hollywood Drive | Interchange |
| Madison | Jackson | | | US 70 west (Airways Boulevard/SR 1 west) – Brownsville | Northern end of US 70/SR 1 concurrency; at-grade intersection; provides access to McKellar-Sipes Regional Airport |
| Madison | Jackson | | | State Street | At-grade intersection |
| Madison | Jackson | 0.0 | 0.0 | US 45 (Highland Avenue/SR 5) / US 70 east (E Chester Avenue/SR 1 east) – Henderson, Huntingdon | Southern terminus of US 45 Bypass and unsigned SR 186; southern end of US 45 Bypass/US 70/SR 1 concurrency; south end of expressway |
1.000 mi = 1.609 km; 1.000 km = 0.621 mi: Concurrency terminus; Incomplete access

== See also ==
- List of state routes in Tennessee
