= WCTA =

Alamo, Tennessee; United States
- Broadcast area: Crockett County; Memphis metro area
- Frequency: 810 kHz
- Branding: WCTA AM 810

Programming
- Format: defunct was news/talk
- Affiliations: USA Radio Network

Ownership
- Owner: Robert Davis; (Alamo Media LLC)

History
- First air date: 1983
- Last air date: August 1, 2020; 5 years ago

Technical information
- Facility ID: 23305
- Class: D
- Power: 250 watts (day-only)
- Transmitter coordinates: 35°47′59″N 89°07′20″W

WCTA (810 AM) was an American radio station licensed to serve Alamo, the county seat of Crockett County, Tennessee. WCTA was a class D facility licensed to broadcast with 250 watts of power on a frequency of 810 kHz, operating only during daylight hours to protect both KGO in San Francisco, California, and WGY in Schenectady, New York, from skywave interference. The broadcast license was held by Robert Davis, through licensee Alamo Media LLC. The station, established in 1983, fell silent on and off from 2008 through June 2012 before resuming normal operation. The station ran sporadically and lost its license in August 2020.

== Programming ==
The station was launched in 1983 airing a full service format mixing country & western and middle of the road music with news and farm programming. By the late 1980s the station has shifted to a pure country & western music format with limited news programming. This lasted through the mid-1990s when the station shifted to a mix of Top 40 and adult contemporary music.

As the 2000s began, the station was back to country music with some Christian music block programming. In its last few years before falling silent in 2008 due to the declining health of the station's owner, WCTA broadcast a news/talk/sports radio format, including select programming from USA Radio Network.

== History ==
In 1979, Crockett Broadcasting Corporation applied to the U.S. Federal Communications Commission (FCC) for a construction permit for a new broadcast radio station. The FCC granted this permit on February 20, 1980, with a scheduled expiration date of February 20, 1981. The new station was assigned call sign "WCTA".

In August 1981, Crockett Broadcasting notified the FCC that control of the company had passed from Ralph Clenney and Branson Townsen to Roy Davis. The FCC approved the move on October 5, 1981. After a series of extensions, construction and testing were completed in September 1983 and the station was granted its broadcast license on November 28, 1983. The station began broadcasting a full service format mixing music, news, and information.

In June 1986, Crockett Broadcasting Corporation reached a deal to sell WCTA to Charles C. Allen. The deal was approved by the FCC on August 13, 1986. In August 1990, Charles C. Allen contracted to sell WCTA to Gary Morris Reasons for $75,000. The sale was approved by the FCC on October 10, 1990, and the transaction was formally consummated the same day. In December 1996, Gary Morris Reasons notified the FCC of his intent to transfer the WCTA broadcast license to Billy Hugh Williams. The transaction gained FCC approval on February 21, 1997, and formal consummation of the deal occurred on March 19, 1997.

After a period of sporadic operation, the station went completely dark in early 2008 due to the declining health of license holder Billy Hugh Williams. The station reported to the FCC that it had been on and off the air for various periods from that time through 2012 but that normal operation was resumed in June 2012. The station was sporadically on and off carrying NOAA weather Radio and generic music. The station's license expired on August 1, 2020. However the station was back on even though its license had expired for a few weeks but is now silent.

Effective October 5, 2015, WCTA's license was assigned to Robert Davis' Alamo Media LLC in exchange for forgiveness of a debt of $43,500. Its license expired August 1, 2020.
