= Charles P. Roland =

American historian and army officer (1918–2022)

- Born: Charles Pierce Roland; April 8, 1918; Maury City, Tennessee, U.S.
- Died: April 12, 2022 (aged 104); Lexington, Kentucky, U.S.
- Education: Vanderbilt University; George Washington University; Louisiana State University
- Occupations: Historian, professor
- Years active: c. 1940–2022
- Known for: Professor emeritus at the University of Kentucky
- Notable work: Research of the American South and the American Civil War, president of the Southern Historical Association, president of Louisiana Historical Association, executive committee member of Kentucky Historic Society, professor of the Harold Keith Johnson Institute
- Spouse: Allie Lee Roland (m. 1948; died 2018)
- Children: 3
- Military career
- Branch: United States Army
- Rank: Captain
- Unit: 99th Infantry Division
- Conflict: World War II (European theatre)
- Awards: Bronze Star; Purple Heart

Charles Pierce Roland (April 8, 1918 – April 12, 2022) was an American historian and professor emeritus of the University of Kentucky who was known for his research field of the American South and the U.S. Civil War. Roland was a captain in the United States Army and a World War II veteran. He served as the elected president of the Southern Historical Association and contributed to several other historical societies.

== Early life ==
Born in the western Tennessee town Maury City on April 8, 1918, Roland grew up as the son and grandson of a family of teachers in Henderson. As a child in the American South, he heard numerous primary accounts of the Civil War from veterans, saying in an interview "There were quite a number of veterans of the Civil War living in that area".

First graduating from Vanderbilt University in 1938, he had studied under poet John Crowe Ransom. He became a high-school history teacher for two years in Alamo, Tennessee, before moving to Washington, D.C., to start work as a historical aide for the National Park Service. Roland would continue in this role until middle of January in 1942 when he was inducted into the United States Armed Forces.

During World War II, he would serve as a captain in the 99th Infantry Division in the European theatre and was awarded the Purple Heart and Bronze Star over the course of his deployment. He later received his master's degree from George Washington University and then his doctoral degree at Louisiana State University after the war.

== Academic career ==
Roland served in several academic capacities throughout his career and authored a considerable amount of published works on the American Civil War. Around 1959–1960, he was awarded a fellowship from the John Simon Guggenheim Memorial Foundation. In 1981, he was elected president of the Southern Historical Association.

Starting in 1970, following his employment by Tulane University, he became a professor of history emeritus at the University of Kentucky; a position he would hold until he retired in 1988. That same year, the University of Kentucky established the Charles P. Roland Fellowship to support university students, according to the institution, pursuing research "...in American history, especially the history of the Civil War, race relations and the American South."

Additionally, he served as the elected president of the Louisiana Historical Association, the Harold Keith Johnson Visiting Professor of Military History at the United States Army Military History Institute and Army War College, an executive committee member of the Kentucky Historical Society, and the chairman of the Department of the Army Historical Advisory Committee. At various times throughout his career, he also taught and lectured at West Point.

== Personal life and death ==
On January 23, 1948, Roland married Allie Lee Roland. They remained married for 70 years until her death on April 26, 2018, shortly after Roland's 100th birthday. They had three children.

Roland died at his home in Lexington, Kentucky, on April 12, 2022, four days after his 104th birthday.

== Bibliography ==
=== Books ===
- Roland, Charles P. (1960). The Confederacy. University of Chicago Press. ISBN 978-0-226-72451-5.
- Roland, Charles P. (1964). Albert Sidney Johnston: Soldier of Three Republics. University Press of Kentucky. ISBN 978-0-8131-9000-6.
- Roland, Charles Pierce (1976). The improbable era: the South since World War II. Lexington: University Press of Kentucky. ISBN 978-0-8131-4619-5.
- Roland, Charles P. (1997). Louisiana Sugar Plantations During the Civil War. LSU Press. ISBN 978-0-8071-2221-1.
- Roland, Charles Pierce (2000). Jefferson Davis's Greatest General: Albert Sidney Johnston. Abilene, TX: McWhiney Foundation Press. ISBN 978-1-893114-20-3. OCLC 42786225.
- Roland, Charles P. (November 2003). My odyssey through history: memoirs of war and academe. Louisiana State University Press. ISBN 978-0-8071-2853-4.
- Roland, Charles P. (October 9, 2003). Reflections on Lee: a historian's assessment (Louisiana pbk. ed.). Baton Rouge: Louisiana State University Press. ISBN 978-0-8071-2911-1.
- Roland, Charles Pierce (2004). An American Iliad: The Story of the Civil War. University Press of Kentucky. ISBN 978-0-8131-2300-4.
- Roland, Charles (2010). History Teaches Us to Hope: Reflections on the Civil War and Southern History. University Press of Kentucky. ISBN 978-0-8131-2917-4.

=== Articles ===
- Roland, Charles P.; Robbins, Richard C.; Johnston, Eliza (April 1957). "The Diary of Eliza (Mrs. Albert Sidney) Johnston: The Second Cavalry Comes to Texas". The Southwestern Historical Quarterly. 60 (4): 463–500. ISSN 0038-478X. JSTOR 30237724.
- Roland, Charles P. (December 1958). "Albert Sidney Johnston and the Shiloh Campaign". Civil War History. 4 (4): 355–382. doi:10.1353/cwh.1958.0017. ISSN 1533-6271. S2CID 143883766.
- Roland, Charles P. (Spring 1970). "The South, America's Willo-o'-the-Wisp Eden". Louisiana History: The Journal of the Louisiana Historical Association. 11 (2): 101–119. ISSN 0024-6816. JSTOR 4231114.
- Roland, Charles P. (Autumn 1978). "Louisiana and Secession". Louisiana History: The Journal of the Louisiana Historical Association. 19 (4): 389–399. ISSN 0024-6816. JSTOR 4231817.
- Roland, Charles P. (February 1982). Higginbotham, Sanford W. (ed.). "The Ever-Vanishing South". The Journal of Southern History. 48 (1): 3–20. doi:10.2307/2207294. ISSN 0022-4642. JSTOR 2207294.
- Roland, Charles P. (Winter–Spring 2003). Williams, Kenneth H. (ed.). "Becoming a Soldier". The Register of the Kentucky Historical Society. 101 (1/2): 75–92. ISSN 0023-0243. JSTOR 23384516.
- Roland, Charles P.; Lawrence, Frank (November–December 2007). "Why We Need Our Slaves". Civil War Times. 46 (9). Historynet LLC: 52–58. ISSN 1546-9980. EBSCOhost 27137078.

=== Interviews ===
- Harris, James Russell (Autumn 1991). "On War and History: Charles P. Roland Discusses "An American Iliad"". The Register of the Kentucky Historical Society. 89 (4): 362–376. ISSN 0023-0243. JSTOR 23381931.
- Williams, Kenneth H.; Cooper, William J.; Roland, Charles P. (2003). "Slavery, the Civil War, and Jefferson Davis: An Interview with William J. Cooper Jr. and Charles P. Roland". The Register of the Kentucky Historical Society. 101 (4): 400–456. ISSN 0023-0243. JSTOR 23387081.

== See also ==
- Shiloh National Military Park – near Henderson where Roland grew up.
- List of centenarians (authors, editors, poets and journalists)
