= Spring Creek, Madison County, Tennessee =

Spring Creek, Tennessee
- Unincorporated community
- Location within Tennessee Location within the United States
- Coordinates: 35°46′00″N 88°40′38″W
- Country: United States
- State: Tennessee
- County: Madison
- Elevation: 459 ft (140 m)
- Time zone: UTC-6 (Central (CST))
  - Summer (DST): UTC-5 (CDT)
- ZIP code: 38378
- Area code: 731
- GNIS feature ID: 1271065

Spring Creek is an unincorporated community in Madison County, Tennessee, United States. The zipcode is 38378.

== History ==
Spring Creek was named for a nearby stream of the same name, a tributary of the Middle Fork of the Forked Deer River, after a post office opened there in the spring of 1824. A municipal charter was granted in January 1854, and the West Tennessee Baptist Male Institute was chartered in Spring Creek that March. The Institute, later called Madison College, continued operation until it burned down in February 1876.

The community remained mostly untouched during the American Civil War, save for commercial disruptions. Its main commerce at the time consisted of cotton and wheat production.

Spring Creek's high school, built in the early 20th century, disbanded in 1943 to consolidate with others in the formation of North Side High School, and its elementary school closed in 1964.

The modern-day area of Spring Creek consists of 2 community centers, The Lodge and The Ledge at Spring Creek--the latter known colloquially as 'The Courthouse'. Both host a mix of private events and community gatherings, as well as host to community organizers, non-profit fundraisers, and as a local hub of the annual Hwy. 70, Tenn., yard sale each summer. Spring Creek is home to a few locally owned, family businesses, a Post Office, and also maintains an auxiliary station for the Madison County Fire Department.
