= Chickasaw National Wildlife Refuge =

Protected area of Tennessee, United States

- IUCN category IV (habitat/species management area)
- Location within the United States
- Location: Lauderdale and Dyer Counties, Tennessee, United States
- Nearest city: Ripley, Tennessee
- Coordinates: 35°50′00″N 89°39′00″W
- Area: 25,006 acres (101.20 km^{2})
- Established: 1985
- Governing body: U.S. Fish and Wildlife Service
- Website: Chickasaw National Wildlife Refuge

Chickasaw National Wildlife Refuge is a 25,006-acre (101.20 km^{2}) National Wildlife Refuge located along the Mississippi River in West Tennessee. The vast majority of the refuge is located in the northwestern part of Lauderdale County with small portions extending into southern Dyer County. The area is noted for a diversity of wildlife, notably white-tailed deer, wild turkey, beaver, and waterfowl. Established in 1985, it occupies land that was once owned by the Anderson Tully Inc of Memphis, Tennessee.
