= Eaton, Tennessee =

Human settlement in Tennessee, United States

Coordinates: 35.96896°N 89.132013°W

Eaton is an unincorporated community in Gibson County, Tennessee.

== Geography ==
Eaton is located on the right bank of the Middle Fork of the Forked Deer River, about 11 miles (18 km) west of Trenton. Eaton is the site of a post office, which is assigned zip code 38331.State Route 188 (Riverside-Yorkville Road)passes through Eaton.

== History ==
The community was first settled in the 1820s after the Jackson Purchase opened West Tennessee to European-American settlement. It was originally known as Buckner's Bluff after early settler J.W. Buckner, but was renamed Eaton in 1827, after John H. Eaton, United States Senator from Tennessee who later became United States Secretary of War in the administration of President Andrew Jackson. It was incorporated as a municipality in the 1830s, lost its incorporated status at some time thereafter, and was reincorporated again around 1875 to 1880, but later lost its incorporated status again. A post office was first established in Eaton in 1830.

The community's commercial peak was in the 1830s. Before rail connections were established in the region, Eaton was an important shipping point, served by keelboats, flatboats, and occasional small steamboats that navigated on the Forked Deer River.
