= Gordonsburg, Tennessee =

- Unincorporated community
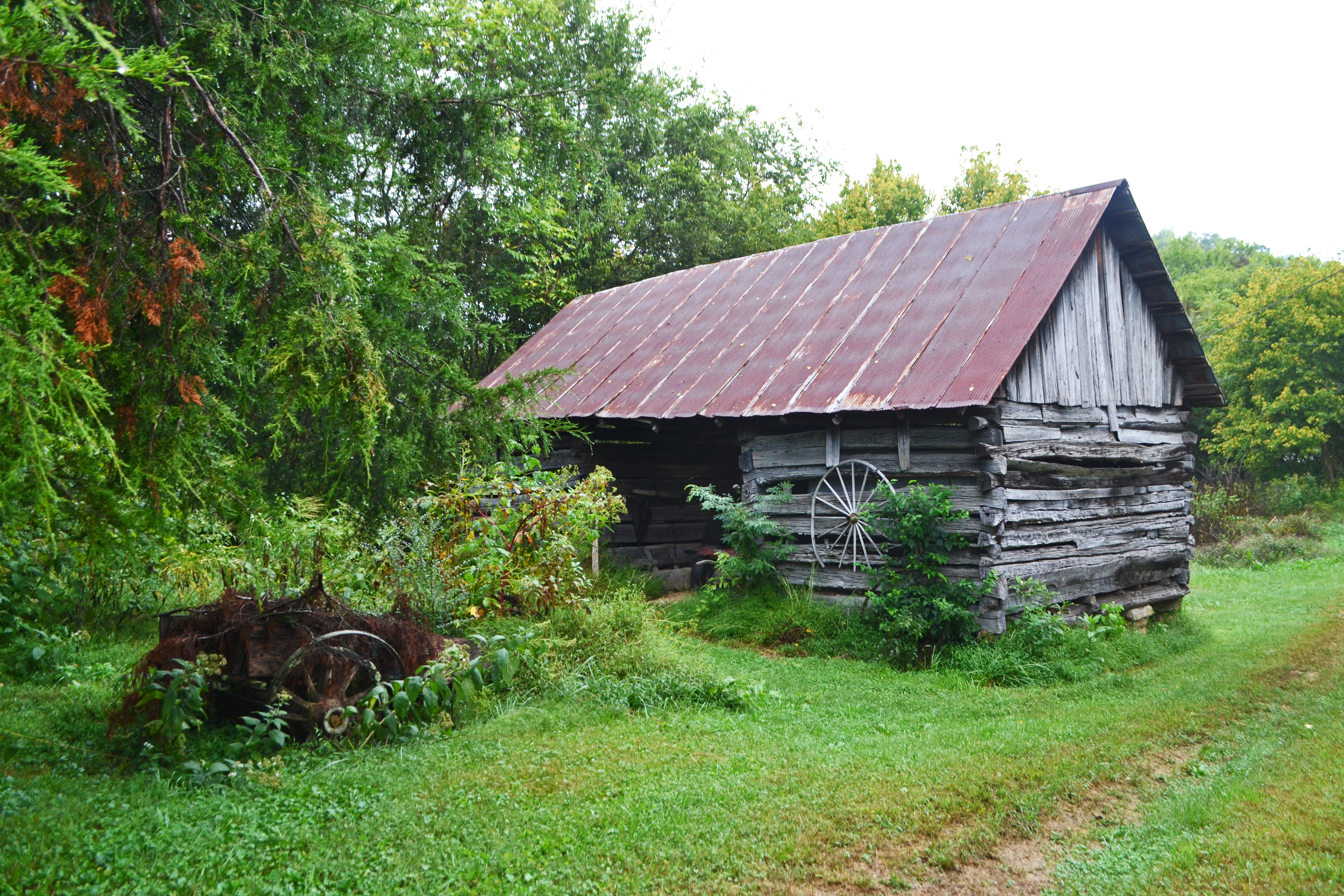
- Ambrose Blackburn Farmstead original shed

- Location in Tennessee Location in the United States
- Coordinates: 35°34′11″N 87°25′26″W
- Country: United States
- State: Tennessee
- County: Lewis
- Elevation: 610 ft (190 m)
- Time zone: UTC-6 (Central (CST))
  - Summer (DST): UTC-5 (CDT)
- GNIS feature ID: 1315135

Gordonsburg is an unincorporated community in northeastern Lewis County, Tennessee. It lies at the intersection of U.S. Route 412 with the Natchez Trace Parkway, east of the city of Hohenwald, the county seat of Lewis County. Its elevation is 610 feet (186 m).
