= Gates, Tennessee =

- Town
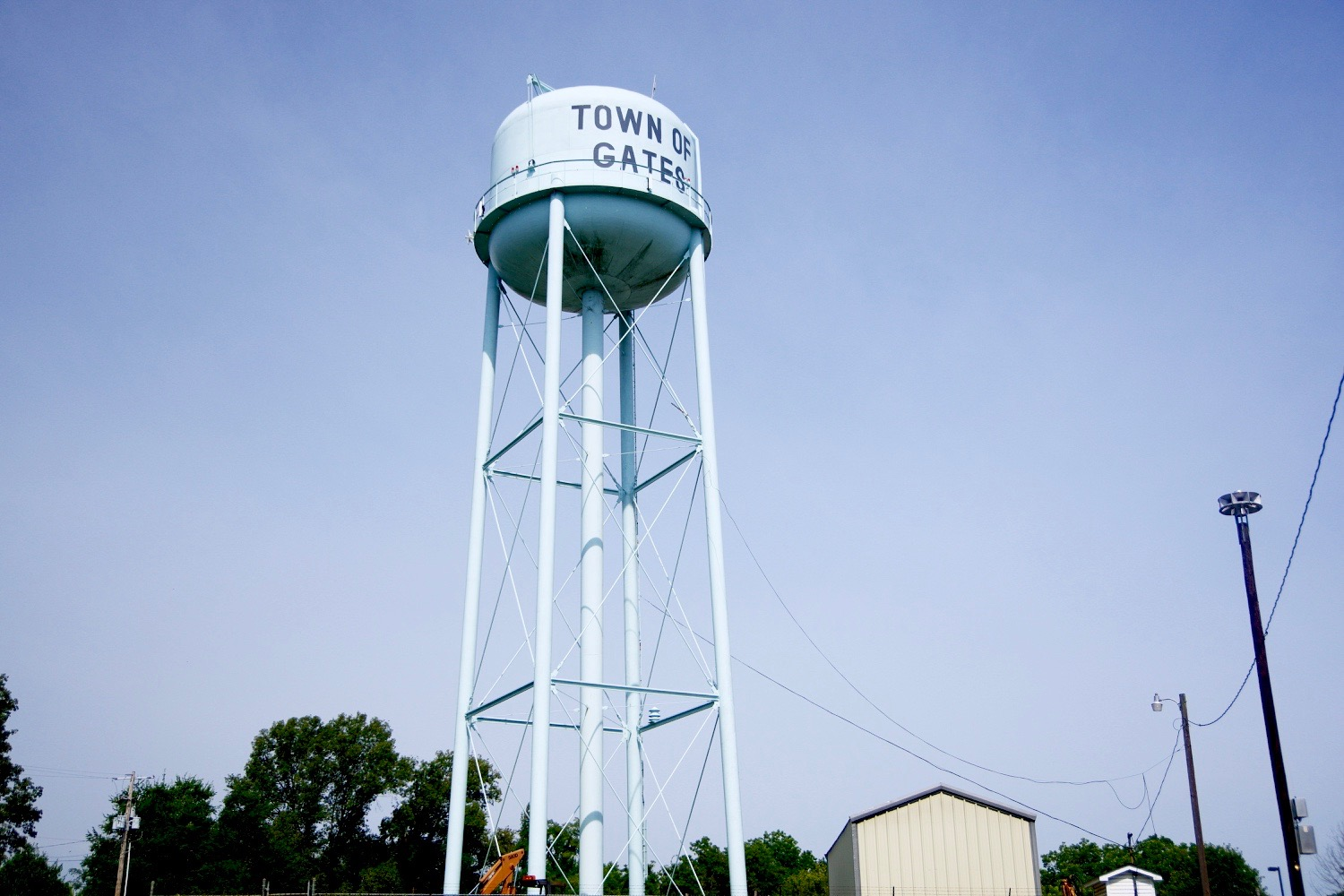
- Water tower in Gates
- Nickname: Gates America
- Location of Gates in Lauderdale County, Tennessee.
- Coordinates: 35°50′21″N 89°24′25″W
- Country: United States
- State: Tennessee
- County: Lauderdale

Area
  - Total: 0.71 sq mi (1.83 km^{2})
  - Land: 0.71 sq mi (1.83 km^{2})
  - Water: 0 sq mi (0.00 km^{2})
- Elevation: 312 ft (95 m)

Population (2020)
  - Total: 664
  - Density: 941.8/sq mi (363.63/km^{2})
- Time zone: UTC-6 (Central (CST))
  - Summer (DST): UTC-5 (CDT)
- ZIP code: 38037
- Area code: 731
- FIPS code: 47-28740
- GNIS feature ID: 1285236

Gates is a town in Lauderdale County, Tennessee, United States. As of the 2020 census, Gates had a population of 664.

== History ==
Gates was established around 1850 and named for Revolutionary War general Horatio Gates. The town was incorporated in 1886.

== Geography ==
Gates is located at 35°50′21″N 89°24′25″W (35.839253, -89.407058). The town is concentrated around the intersection of State Routes 88 and 209, south of Halls and northeast of Ripley. Memphis lies approximately 65 miles (105 km) to the southwest.

According to the United States Census Bureau, the town has a total area of 0.7 square miles (1.8 km^{2}), all land.

Gates is situated on the southeastern edge of the New Madrid Seismic Zone, an area with a high earthquake risk.

== Demographics ==
Historical population
Census	Pop.	Note	%±
1890	204		—
1900	167		−18.1%
1910	292		74.9%
1920	303		3.8%
1930	314		3.6%
1940	383		22.0%
1950	234		−38.9%
1960	291		24.4%
1970	523		79.7%
1980	729		39.4%
1990	608		−16.6%
2000	901		48.2%
2010	647		−28.2%
2020	664		2.6%

=== 2020 Census ===
Gates, Tennessee – Racial and ethnic composition Note: the US Census treats Hispanic/Latino as an ethnic category. This table excludes Latinos from the racial categories and assigns them to a separate category. Hispanics/Latinos may be of any race.
Race / Ethnicity (NH = Non-Hispanic)	Pop 2000	Pop 2010	Pop 2020	% 2000	% 2010	% 2020
White alone (NH)	414	252	305	45.95%	38.95%	45.93%
Black or African American alone (NH)	480	376	318	53.27%	58.11%	47.89%
Native American or Alaska Native alone (NH)	1	4	2	0.11%	0.62%	0.30%
Asian alone (NH)	0	0	0	0.00%	0.00%	0.00%
Pacific Islander alone (NH)	0	0	0	0.00%	0.00%	0.00%
Some Other Race alone (NH)	0	0	1	0.00%	0.00%	0.15%
Mixed Race or Multi-Racial (NH)	4	7	29	0.44%	1.08%	4.37%
Hispanic or Latino (any race)	2	8	9	0.22%	1.24%	1.36%
Total	901	647	664	100.00%	100.00%	100.00%

As of the 2020 United States census, there were 664 people, 276 households, and 162 families residing in the town.

=== 2000 census ===
As of the census of 2000, there were 901 people, 266 households, and 201 families residing in the town. The population density was 1,272.5 inhabitants per square mile (491.3/km^{2}). There were 290 housing units at an average density of 409.6 per square mile (158.1/km^{2}). The racial makeup of the town was 45.95% White, 53.39% African American, 0.11% Native American, and 0.55% from two or more races. Hispanic or Latino of any race were 0.22% of the population.

There were 266 households, out of which 41.0% had children under the age of 18 living with them, 38.3% were married couples living together, 31.6% had a female householder with no husband present, and 24.1% were non-families. 21.4% of all households were made up of individuals, and 9.4% had someone living alone who was 65 years of age or older. The average household size was 2.79 and the average family size was 3.20.

In the town, the population was spread out, with 28.6% under the age of 18, 7.3% from 18 to 24, 22.9% from 25 to 44, 17.1% from 45 to 64, and 24.1% who were 65 years of age or older. The median age was 37 years. For every 100 females, there were 69.0 males. For every 100 females age 18 and over, there were 58.0 males.

The median income for a household in the town was $29,191, and the median income for a family was $29,653. Males had a median income of $24,615 versus $22,750 for females. The per capita income for the town was $9,910. About 26.3% of families and 26.5% of the population were below the poverty line, including 30.8% of those under age 18 and 40.6% of those age 65 or over.

== Notable person ==
- George Taliaferro - Former professional American football player
