= Crucifer, Tennessee =

- Unincorporated community
- Location within Tennessee Location within the United States
- Coordinates: 35°38′46″N 88°33′00″W
- Country: United States
- State: Tennessee
- County: Henderson
- Elevation: 492 ft (150 m)
- Time zone: UTC-6 (Central (CST))
  - Summer (DST): UTC-5 (CDT)
- Area code: 731
- GNIS feature ID: 1306211

Crucifer is an unincorporated community in Henderson County, Tennessee, United States.

== Etymology ==
Crucifer was originally called "Cross Plains", and under the latter name was founded c. 1835.

== History ==
A post office called Crucifer was established in 1836, and remained in operation until 1904.
