= Chestnut Grove, Tennessee =

Chestnut Grove
- Unincorporated community
- Location within the state of Tennessee Chestnut Grove (the United States)
- Coordinates: 35°37′48″N 87°48′34″W
- Country: United States
- State: Tennessee
- County: Perry
- Elevation: 600 ft (180 m)
- Time zone: UTC-6 (Central (CST))
  - Summer (DST): UTC-5 (CDT)
- GNIS feature ID: 1280382

Chestnut Grove is an unincorporated community in Perry County, Tennessee, United States. Its elevation is 600 feet (183 m). Chestnut Grove is located along US Route 412 east of Linden, Tennessee. The Chestnut Grove Quadrangle of the United States' National Map is named after the community.
