= Darden, Tennessee =

- Census-designated place
- Location within Tennessee Location within the United States
- Coordinates: 35°38′17″N 88°13′01″W
- Country: United States
- State: Tennessee
- County: Henderson

Area
  - Total: 8.39 sq mi (21.73 km^{2})
  - Land: 8.39 sq mi (21.73 km^{2})
  - Water: 0 sq mi (0.00 km^{2})
- Elevation: 463 ft (141 m)

Population (2020)
  - Total: 364
  - Density: 43.4/sq mi (16.75/km^{2})
- Time zone: UTC-6 (Central (CST))
  - Summer (DST): UTC-5 (CDT)
- ZIP code: 38328
- Area code: 731
- GNIS feature ID: 1282038

Darden is an unincorporated community and census-designated place (CDP) in Henderson County, Tennessee, United States. As of the 2010 census, its population was 399.
