= Bonicord, Tennessee =

- Unincorporated community
- Location within Tennessee Location within the United States
- Coordinates: 35°57′16″N 89°19′18″W
- Country: United States
- State: Tennessee
- County: Dyer
- Elevation: 302 ft (92 m)
- Time zone: UTC-6 (Central (CST))
  - Summer (DST): UTC-5 (CDT)
- Postal code: 38024
- Area code: 731
- GNIS feature ID: 1277951

Bonicord is an unincorporated community in Dyer County, Tennessee, United States.

== Economy ==
Bonicord is predominantly a small farming community centered around a volunteer fire department and hosts several small businesses.

== Volunteer Fire Department ==
Bonicord's volunteer fire department also functions as a voting station for local residents, as well as small community events and organizations.
