= Cairo, Crockett County, Tennessee =

Cairo, Tennessee
- Unincorporated community
- Location within Tennessee Location within the United States
- Coordinates: 35°49′24″N 89°09′58″W
- Country: United States
- State: Tennessee
- County: Crockett
- Elevation: 348 ft (106 m)
- Time zone: UTC-6 (Central (CST))
  - Summer (DST): UTC-5 (CDT)
- Area code: 731
- GNIS feature ID: 1314783

Cairo is an unincorporated community in Crockett County, Tennessee, United States. Cairo is located on Tennessee State Route 188 3.8 miles (6.1 km) northwest of Alamo.
