= North Fork of the Forked Deer River =

North Fork of Forked Deer River

Location
- Country: United States
- State: Tennessee

Physical characteristics
- Source: Near Medina in southeastern Gibson County
- Mouth: Forked Deer River in Dyer County
  - coordinates: 35°23′58″N 88°36′13″W

The North Fork of the Forked Deer River is formed in Gibson County to the south of Chapel Hill Road near Medina and flows to the northwest before entering Dyer County. Here it accepts the flow from the Middle Fork and then joins with the South Fork to form the Forked Deer River.

== See also ==
- List of rivers of Tennessee
