= Maury City, Tennessee =

- Town
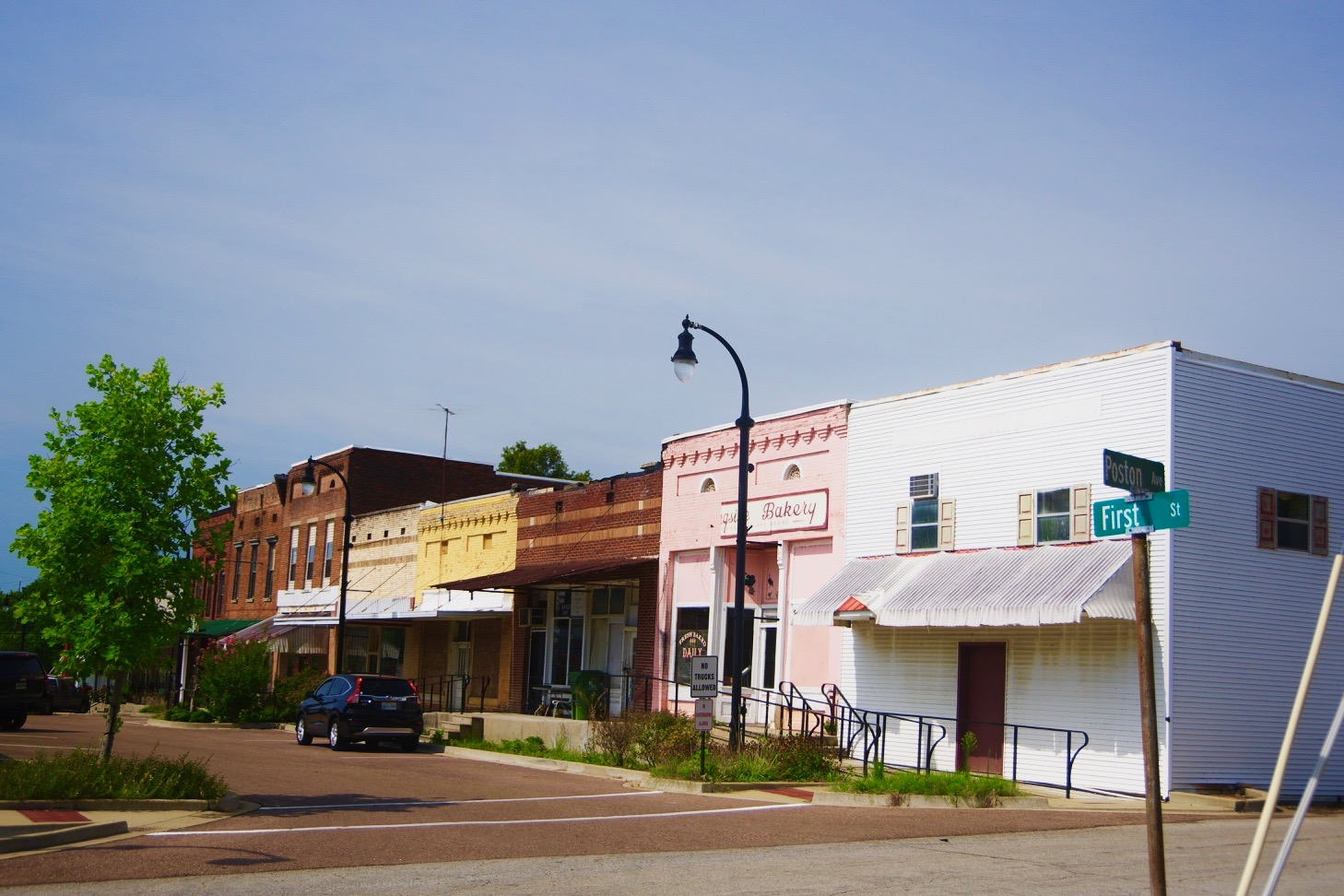
- Businesses along 1st Street

- Location of Maury City in Crockett County, Tennessee.
- Coordinates: 35°48′56″N 89°13′26″W
- Country: United States
- State: Tennessee
- County: Crockett
- First settled: 1879
- Incorporated: 1911
- Received Town Charter: September 7, 1915
- Named for: Abram Poindexter Maury

Government
  - Mayor: Bobbie Wells

Area
  - Total: 1.13 sq mi (2.92 km^{2})
  - Land: 1.13 sq mi (2.92 km^{2})
  - Water: 0 sq mi (0.00 km^{2})
- Elevation: 351 ft (107 m)

Population (2020)
  - Total: 583
  - Density: 517.7/sq mi (199.88/km^{2})
- Time zone: UTC-6 (Central (CST))
  - Summer (DST): UTC-5 (CDT)
- ZIP code: 38050
- Area code: 731
- FIPS code: 47-46540
- GNIS feature ID: 1292965
- Website: https://townofmaurycity.com/

Maury City is a town in Crockett County, Tennessee. As of the 2020 census, Maury City had a population of 583. Locals pronounce the town's name as "Murray City."

== History ==
Maury City is named for congressman and Tennessee state legislator Abram Poindexter Maury. The town was first settled in 1876 in accordance with some railroad speculation. However, though rails were laid and at least one train ran, the railroad never materialized. The town was formally established in 1906 and received its charter in 1915. The city incorporated in 1911.

Charles P. Roland, historian of the Civil War and the American South, was born in Maury City in 1918. His father, Clifford Paul Roland, was a schoolteacher in Maury City.

== Geography ==
Maury City is located at 35°48′56″N 89°13′26″W (35.815535, -89.223866). The town is situated at the intersection of State Route 88 and State Route 189, northwest of Jackson and southeast of Dyersburg. SR 88 connects the city with U.S. Route 412 and Alamo to the east, and with the Halls area to the west. SR 189 connects Maury City with Friendship to the north.

According to the United States Census Bureau, the town has a total area of 1.1 square miles (2.8 km^{2}), all land.

== Demographics ==
Historical population
Census	Pop.	Note	%±
1920	452		—
1930	425		−6.0%
1940	412		−3.1%
1950	553		34.2%
1960	624		12.8%
1970	813		30.3%
1980	989		21.6%
1990	782		−20.9%
2000	704		−10.0%
2010	674		−4.3%
2020	583		−13.5%

As of the census of 2000, there were 704 people, 301 households, and 195 families residing in the town. The population density was 632.0 inhabitants per square mile (244.0/km^{2}). There were 325 housing units at an average density of 291.8 per square mile (112.7/km^{2}). The racial makeup of the town was 62.64% White, 32.81% African American, 0.14% Asian, 2.98% from other races, and 1.42% from two or more races. Hispanic or Latino of any race were 4.12% of the population.

There were 301 households, out of which 27.6% had children under the age of 18 living with them, 48.5% were married couples living together, 13.6% had a female householder with no husband present, and 34.9% were non-families. 31.9% of all households were made up of individuals, and 14.6% had someone living alone who was 65 years of age or older. The average household size was 2.34 and the average family size was 2.92.

In the town, the population was spread out, with 22.6% under the age of 18, 8.9% from 18 to 24, 26.8% from 25 to 44, 25.0% from 45 to 64, and 16.6% who were 65 years of age or older. The median age was 39 years. For every 100 females, there were 89.2 males. For every 100 females age 18 and over, there were 86.0 males.

The median income for a household in the town was $26,645, and the median income for a family was $33,250. Males had a median income of $23,250 versus $24,375 for females. The per capita income for the town was $14,519. About 13.7% of families and 16.1% of the population were below the poverty line, including 17.8% of those under age 18 and 16.4% of those age 65 or over.
