= Yorkville, Tennessee =

- City
- Location of Yorkville in Gibson County, Tennessee.
- Coordinates: 36°5′55″N 89°7′8″W
- Country: United States
- State: Tennessee
- County: Gibson
- Established: 1830
- Incorporated: 1848
- Named for: Yorkville, South Carolina

Area
  - Total: 1.30 sq mi (3.37 km^{2})
  - Land: 1.30 sq mi (3.37 km^{2})
  - Water: 0 sq mi (0.00 km^{2})
- Elevation: 381 ft (116 m)

Population (2020)
  - Total: 236
  - Density: 181.6/sq mi (70.13/km^{2})
- Time zone: UTC-6 (Central (CST))
  - Summer (DST): UTC-5 (CDT)
- ZIP code: 38389
- Area code: 731
- FIPS code: 47-82360
- GNIS feature ID: 1304709

Yorkville is a city in Gibson County, Tennessee. As of the 2020 census, Yorkville had a population of 236.

== Geography ==
Yorkville is located at 36°5′55″N 89°7′8″W (36.098738, -89.119021).

According to the United States Census Bureau, the city has a total area of 1.4 square miles (3.6 km^{2}), all land.

== Demographics ==
Historical population
Census	Pop.	Note	%±
1880	99		—
1970	243		—
1980	272		11.9%
1990	347		27.6%
2000	293		−15.6%
2010	286		−2.4%
2020	236		−17.5%

=== 2020 census ===
As of the 2020 census, Yorkville had a population of 236. The median age was 44.1 years. 21.2% of residents were under the age of 18 and 22.5% of residents were 65 years of age or older. For every 100 females there were 107.0 males, and for every 100 females age 18 and over there were 102.2 males age 18 and over.

0.0% of residents lived in urban areas, while 100.0% lived in rural areas.

There were 91 households in Yorkville, of which 33.0% had children under the age of 18 living in them. Of all households, 60.4% were married-couple households, 15.4% were households with a male householder and no spouse or partner present, and 16.5% were households with a female householder and no spouse or partner present. About 15.4% of all households were made up of individuals and 4.4% had someone living alone who was 65 years of age or older.

There were 107 housing units, of which 15.0% were vacant. The homeowner vacancy rate was 5.1% and the rental vacancy rate was 14.3%.

Racial composition as of the 2020 census
Race	Number	Percent
White	221	93.6%
Black or African American	1	0.4%
American Indian and Alaska Native	3	1.3%
Asian	0	0.0%
Native Hawaiian and Other Pacific Islander	0	0.0%
Some other race	6	2.5%
Two or more races	5	2.1%
Hispanic or Latino (of any race)	7	3.0%

=== 2000 census ===
As of the 2000 census, there was a population of 293, with 116 households and 88 families residing in the city. The population density was 206.4 inhabitants per square mile (79.7/km^{2}). There were 125 housing units at an average density of 88.1 per square mile (34.0/km^{2}). The racial makeup of the city was 99.66% White and 0.34% Native American. Hispanic or Latino of any race were 0.34% of the population.

There were 116 households, out of which 33.6% had children under the age of 18 living with them, 62.1% were married couples living together, 10.3% had a female householder with no husband present, and 23.3% were non-families. 20.7% of all households were made up of individuals, and 13.8% had someone living alone who was 65 years of age or older. The average household size was 2.53 and the average family size was 2.90.

In the city, the population was spread out, with 25.3% under the age of 18, 4.4% from 18 to 24, 31.1% from 25 to 44, 17.4% from 45 to 64, and 21.8% who were 65 years of age or older. The median age was 39 years. For every 100 females, there were 92.8 males. For every 100 females age 18 and over, there were 88.8 males.

The median income for a household in the city was $26,111, and the median income for a family was $37,813. Males had a median income of $28,125 versus $21,250 for females. The per capita income for the city was $13,805. About 3.4% of families and 9.2% of the population were below the poverty line, including 14.7% of those under the age of eighteen and 15.1% of those 65 or over.

== Notable people ==
- Edward "Ed" Jones, represented Tennessee in the U.S. House of Representatives from 1969 to 1989; born in Yorkville

== Media ==
Radio Stations

- WWGY 99.3 "Today's Best Music with Ace & TJ in the Morning"
- WTPR-AM 710 "The Greatest Hits of All Time"

== History ==
John C. Kuykendall, from York District, South Carolina, first settled on the site in 1830, building a home and a store. Other settlers arrived shortly thereafter. By 1850 Yorkville was incorporated, with W.H. Miller as its first mayor.

The Yorkville Hotel opened in 1840, and a flour mill and cotton gin were operating in Yorkville by 1870.

== Education ==
Gibson County Special School District is the area school district. Gibson County High School is a comprehensive high school of the district.

== Churches ==
The town has three churches: Yorkville Cumberland Presbyterian Church, Bethel Baptist Church and the Yorkville Church of Christ.
