= Medina, Tennessee =

- City
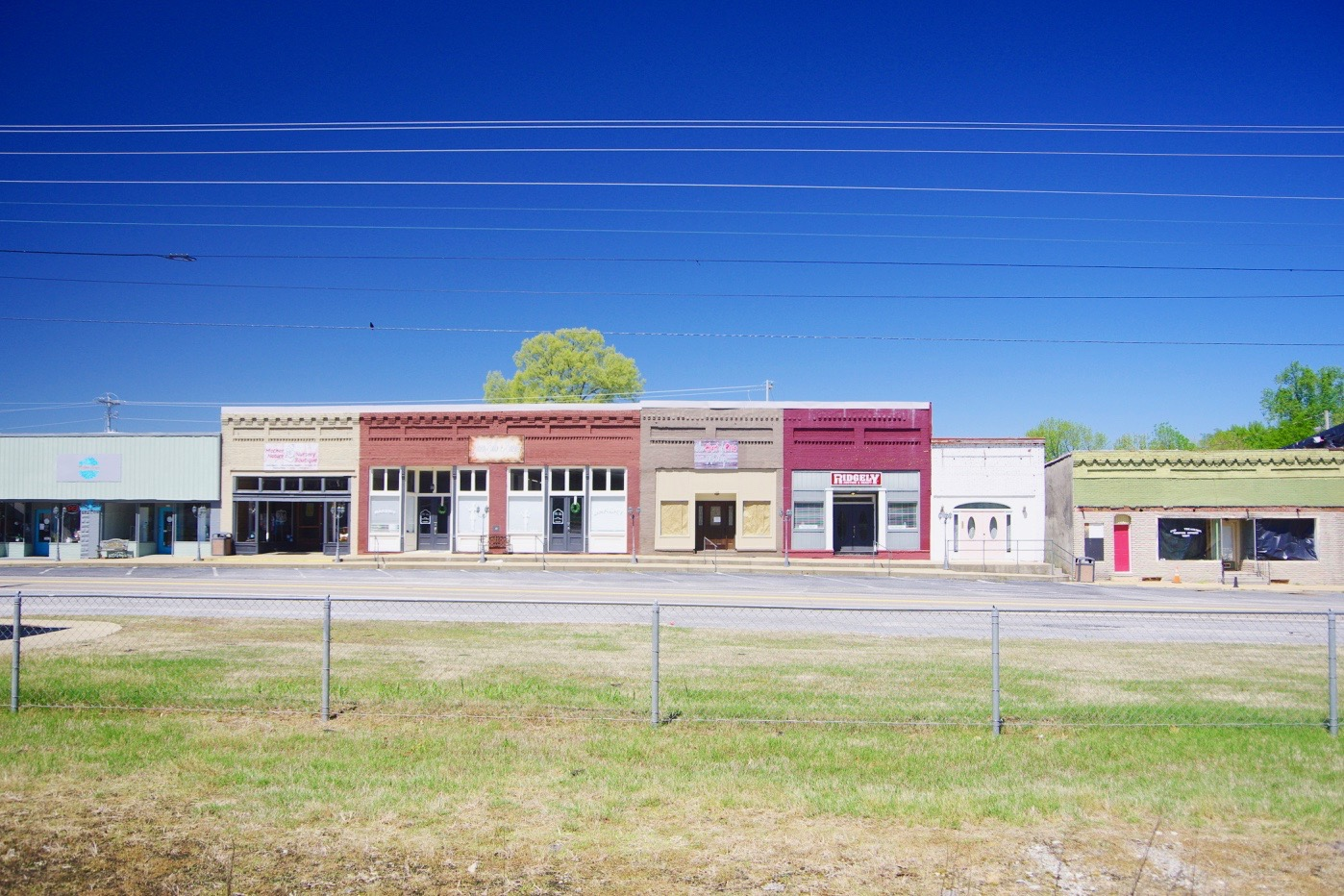
- Main Street

- Location of Medina in Gibson County, Tennessee.
- Coordinates: 35°48′19″N 88°46′51″W
- Country: United States
- State: Tennessee
- County: Gibson

Area
  - Total: 4.03 sq mi (10.44 km^{2})
  - Land: 4.01 sq mi (10.39 km^{2})
  - Water: 0.023 sq mi (0.06 km^{2})
- Elevation: 490 ft (150 m)

Population (2020)
  - Total: 5,126
  - Density: 1,278.2/sq mi (493.51/km^{2})
- Time zone: UTC-6 (Central (CST))
  - Summer (DST): UTC-5 (CDT)
- ZIP code: 38355
- Area code: 731
- FIPS code: 47-47000
- GNIS feature ID: 1293529
- Website: www.cityofmedinatn.org

Medina (/məˈdaɪnə/) is a city in Gibson County, Tennessee, United States. The population was 5,126 at the 2020 census,

== Geography ==
Medina is located in southern Gibson County centered around 35°48′19″N 88°46′51″W (35.805376, -88.780904). The city is contained within two separate areas connected by part of Blackmon Rd.; a small part of its southern border follows the Madison County line.

According to the United States Census Bureau, the city of Medina has a total area of 3.2 square miles (8.2 km^{2}), of which 0.02 square miles (0.06 km^{2}), or 0.70%, are water.

== Demographics ==
Historical population
Census	Pop.	Note	%±
1890	273		—
1910	320		—
1920	358		11.9%
1930	414		15.6%
1940	414		0.0%
1950	690		66.7%
1960	722		4.6%
1970	755		4.6%
1980	687		−9.0%
1990	658		−4.2%
2000	969		47.3%
2010	3,479		259.0%
2020	5,126		47.3%

=== 2020 census ===
As of the 2020 census, Medina had a population of 5,126. The median age was 31.2 years. 35.9% of residents were under the age of 18 and 6.5% of residents were 65 years of age or older. For every 100 females there were 94.5 males, and for every 100 females age 18 and over there were 88.7 males age 18 and over.

0.0% of residents lived in urban areas, while 100.0% lived in rural areas.

There were 1,667 households in Medina, of which 58.2% had children under the age of 18 living in them. Of all households, 62.1% were married-couple households, 11.8% were households with a male householder and no spouse or partner present, and 20.8% were households with a female householder and no spouse or partner present. About 14.8% of all households were made up of individuals and 5.3% had someone living alone who was 65 years of age or older. There were 1,159 families residing in the city.

There were 1,729 housing units, of which 3.6% were vacant. The homeowner vacancy rate was 1.1% and the rental vacancy rate was 3.0%.

Racial composition as of the 2020 census
Race	Number	Percent
White	4,419	86.2%
Black or African American	306	6.0%
American Indian and Alaska Native	10	0.2%
Asian	70	1.4%
Native Hawaiian and Other Pacific Islander	0	0.0%
Some other race	94	1.8%
Two or more races	227	4.4%
Hispanic or Latino (of any race)	173	3.4%

=== 2000 census ===
As of the census of 2000, there was a population of 969, with 414 households and 279 families residing in the city. The population density was 385.3 inhabitants per square mile (148.8/km^{2}). There were 459 housing units at an average density of 182.5 per square mile (70.5/km^{2}). The racial makeup of the city was 97.73% White, 1.34% African American, 0.10% Native American, 0.10% from other races, and 0.72% from two or more races. Hispanic or Latino of any race were 0.62% of the population.

There were 414 households, out of which 34.3% had children under the age of 18 living with them, 54.6% were married couples living together, 9.7% had a female householder with no husband present, and 32.4% were non-families. 28.7% of all households were made up of individuals, and 12.1% had someone living alone who was 65 years of age or older. The average household size was 2.34 and the average family size was 2.88.

In the city, the population was spread out, with 24.3% under the age of 18, 8.8% from 18 to 24, 34.1% from 25 to 44, 19.1% from 45 to 64, and 13.8% who were 65 years of age or older. The median age was 34 years. For every 100 females, there were 81.8 males. For every 100 females age 18 and over, there were 83.5 males.

The median income for a household in the city was $36,382, and the median income for a family was $40,804. Males had a median income of $33,958 versus $22,059 for females. The per capita income for the city was $19,445. About 8.4% of families and 10.2% of the population were below the poverty line, including 9.0% of those under age 18 and 14.3% of those age 65 or over.

Local schools in Medina, administered by the Gibson County Special School District Board of Trustees in Dyer, Tenn., include South Gibson Elementary School (Kindergarten through 4th grade), South Gibson Middle School (5th grade through 8th grade), and South Gibson High School (9th grade through 12th grade).

== Media ==
- WTPR-AM 710 "The Greatest Hits of All Time"

== Education ==
Gibson County Special School District “GCSSD” is the area school district. Medina has its very own schools. South Gibson County Elementary School, South Gibson County Middle School, and South Gibson County High School. The schools mascots are the SGC Hornets.
