= Friendship, Tennessee =

- City
- Location of Friendship in Crockett County, Tennessee.
- Coordinates: 35°54′37″N 89°14′31″W
- Country: United States
- State: Tennessee
- County: Crockett
- First Settled: 1820's
- Incorporated: 1859

Government
  - Mayor: Casey Burnett

Area
  - Total: 1.32 sq mi (3.42 km^{2})
  - Land: 1.32 sq mi (3.42 km^{2})
  - Water: 0 sq mi (0.00 km^{2})
- Elevation: 400 ft (122 m)

Population (2020)
  - Total: 613
  - Density: 464.9/sq mi (179.49/km^{2})
- Time zone: UTC-6 (Central (CST))
  - Summer (DST): UTC-5 (CDT)
- ZIP code: 38034
- Area code: 731
- FIPS code: 47-27960
- GNIS feature ID: 1284921

Friendship is a city in Crockett County, Tennessee. As of the 2020 census, Friendship had a population of 613.

== History ==
The city of Friendship was founded in 1853, though there was a post office in operation in the area as early as 1844. The city was plotted out in 1858, and incorporated the following year with W.P. Rice serving as the first mayor.

According to local lore, when the post office was established in 1884, there were two major stores that were doing business in the area, each about a mile from the site of the post office. By mutual consent, they split the distance and moved their stores to the site of today's downtown. This act of friendship inspired the town's name.

By the 1920s the Birmingham and Northwestern Railroad had laid track on the east side of town and constructed a depot.

== Geography ==
Friendship is located at 35°54′37″N 89°14′31″W (35.910370, -89.241827).

According to the United States Census Bureau, the city has a total area of 1.3 square miles (3.4 km^{2}), all land.

== Demographics ==
Historical population
| Census | Pop. | Note | %± |
|---|---|---|---|
| 1880 | 243 | | — |
| 1890 | 255 | | 4.9% |
| 1920 | 487 | | — |
| 1930 | 487 | | 0.0% |
| 1940 | 451 | | −7.4% |
| 1950 | 452 | | 0.2% |
| 1960 | 399 | | −11.7% |
| 1970 | 441 | | 10.5% |
| 1980 | 763 | | 73.0% |
| 1990 | 467 | | −38.8% |
| 2000 | 608 | | 30.2% |
| 2010 | 668 | | 9.9% |
| 2020 | 613 | | −8.2% |

=== 2020 census ===
As of the 2020 census, Friendship had a population of 613. The median age was 37.1 years. 26.4% of residents were under the age of 18 and 15.0% of residents were 65 years of age or older. For every 100 females there were 93.4 males, and for every 100 females age 18 and over there were 86.4 males age 18 and over.

0.0% of residents lived in urban areas, while 100.0% lived in rural areas.

There were 237 households in Friendship, of which 36.7% had children under the age of 18 living in them. Of all households, 43.0% were married-couple households, 16.9% were households with a male householder and no spouse or partner present, and 30.4% were households with a female householder and no spouse or partner present. About 27.4% of all households were made up of individuals and 10.5% had someone living alone who was 65 years of age or older.

There were 261 housing units, of which 9.2% were vacant. The homeowner vacancy rate was 3.3% and the rental vacancy rate was 3.2%.

Racial composition as of the 2020 census
| Race | Number | Percent |
|---|---|---|
| White | 459 | 74.9% |
| Black or African American | 55 | 9.0% |
| American Indian and Alaska Native | 2 | 0.3% |
| Asian | 0 | 0.0% |
| Native Hawaiian and Other Pacific Islander | 0 | 0.0% |
| Some other race | 62 | 10.1% |
| Two or more races | 35 | 5.7% |
| Hispanic or Latino (of any race) | 85 | 13.9% |

=== 2000 census ===
As of the 2000 census, there was a population of 608, with 246 households and 171 families residing in the city. The population density was 466.4 inhabitants per square mile (180.1/km^{2}). There were 264 housing units at an average density of 202.5 per square mile (78.2/km^{2}). The racial makeup of the city was 85.36% White, 11.68% African American, 0.33% Native American, 2.14% from other races, and 0.49% from two or more races. Hispanic or Latino of any race were 3.45% of the population.

There were 246 households, out of which 32.5% had children under the age of 18 living with them, 49.6% were married couples living together, 15.9% had a female householder with no husband present, and 30.1% were non-families. 28.0% of all households were made up of individuals, and 10.2% had someone living alone who was 65 years of age or older. The average household size was 2.47 and the average family size was 2.97.

In the city, the population was spread out, with 26.5% under the age of 18, 9.7% from 18 to 24, 27.0% from 25 to 44, 20.7% from 45 to 64, and 16.1% who were 65 years of age or older. The median age was 38 years. For every 100 females, there were 91.8 males. For every 100 females age 18 and over, there were 93.5 males.

The median income for a household in the city was $24,583, and the median income for a family was $35,909. Males had a median income of $29,375 versus $19,792 for females. The per capita income for the city was $14,641. About 16.1% of families and 23.0% of the population were below the poverty line, including 26.2% of those under age 18 and 27.5% of those age 65 or over.

== Notable people ==
- William Fones, jurist who served on the Tennessee Supreme Court, was born in Friendship.
