= Middle Fork of the Forked Deer River =

Middle Fork of Forked Deer River

Location
- Country: United States
- State: Tennessee

Physical characteristics
- Source: Begins in Henderson County
  - coordinates: 35°44′13″N 88°27′9″W
- Mouth: North Fork of the Forked Deer River in Dyer County
  - coordinates: 36°0′39″N 89°12′39″W

The Middle Fork of the Forked Deer River is formed in Henderson County, Tennessee. It is a small stream that flows through Carroll County, northern Madison County, Gibson County, Crockett County and Dyer County where it flows into the North Fork.

== See also ==
- List of rivers of Tennessee
