= Alamo, Tennessee =

- Town
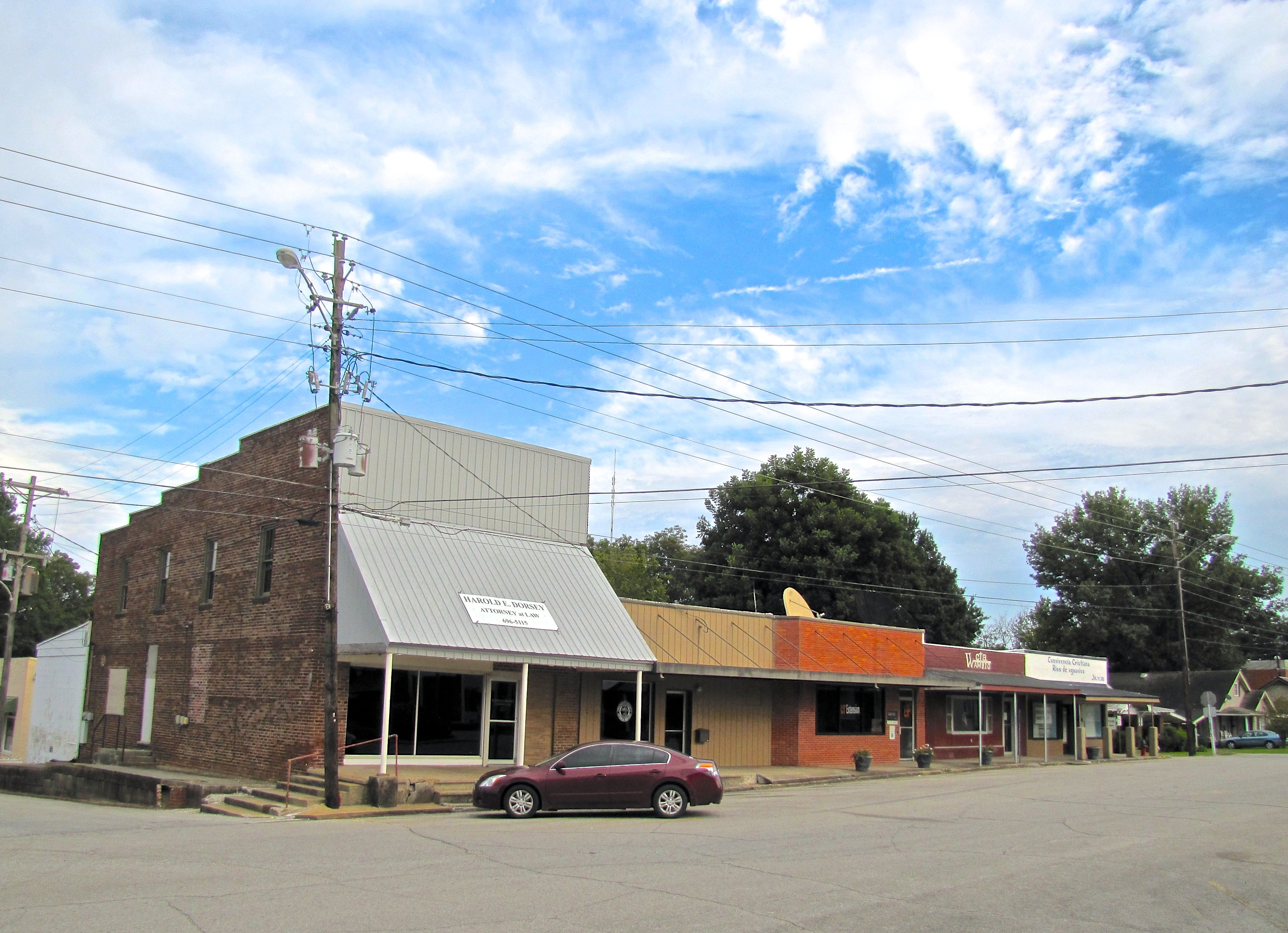
- Buildings along the courthouse square

- Location of Alamo in Crockett County, Tennessee.
- Coordinates: 35°47′3″N 89°6′57″W
- Country: United States
- State: Tennessee
- County: Crockett
- Incorporated: 1911
- Named for: Battle of the Alamo

Area
  - Total: 2.20 sq mi (5.69 km^{2})
  - Land: 2.20 sq mi (5.69 km^{2})
  - Water: 0 sq mi (0.00 km^{2})
- Elevation: 360 ft (110 m)

Population (2020)
  - Total: 2,336
  - Density: 1,063.8/sq mi (410.74/km^{2})
- Time zone: UTC-6 (Central (CST))
  - Summer (DST): UTC-5 (CDT)
- ZIP Code: 38001
- Area code: 731
- FIPS code: 47-00440
- GNIS feature ID: 1304782
- Website: www.townofalamo.net

Alamo is a town in Crockett County, Tennessee, United States. As of the 2020 census, Alamo had a population of 2,336. Alamo, located in the central part of West Tennessee, is the county seat of Crockett County.

== History ==
Alamo was first founded as a trading post called Cageville by mercantile partners Isaac M. Johnson and Lycurgus Cage in 1846. The two were the first to do business in the town, engaging in general merchandising in 1847. Johnson became the town's first postmaster in 1848, and the town's first church, built by Methodists, was erected the following year. The name was changed to Alamo after the town became the county seat with the organization of Crockett County in late 1871—the act that formed Crockett County specified that its seat should bear that name, as the county had been formed to commemorate Davy Crockett's stand at the Alamo. The town was incorporated nearly fifty years later, in 1911.

== Geography ==
Alamo is located at 35°47′3″N 89°6′57″W (35.784201, -89.115729). The town is situated northwest of Jackson at the intersection of State Route 54, State Route 221, and State Route 88. U.S. Route 412 passes just west of the town.

According to the United States Census Bureau, the town has a total area of 2.2 square miles (5.7 km^{2}), all land.

=== Climate ===
Climate data for Alamo, Tennessee, 1991–2020 normals, extremes 2001–present
Month	Jan	Feb	Mar	Apr	May	Jun	Jul	Aug	Sep	Oct	Nov	Dec	Year
Record high °F (°C)	74 (23)	77 (25)	84 (29)	91 (33)	92 (33)	102 (39)	102 (39)	104 (40)	98 (37)	94 (34)	85 (29)	75 (24)	104 (40)
Mean maximum °F (°C)	67.1 (19.5)	70.5 (21.4)	78.6 (25.9)	84.6 (29.2)	89.2 (31.8)	94.6 (34.8)	95.4 (35.2)	96.1 (35.6)	93.1 (33.9)	86.9 (30.5)	76.4 (24.7)	70.0 (21.1)	98.0 (36.7)
Mean daily maximum °F (°C)	46.5 (8.1)	50.7 (10.4)	59.6 (15.3)	70.0 (21.1)	78.3 (25.7)	85.9 (29.9)	88.6 (31.4)	88.2 (31.2)	82.8 (28.2)	72.2 (22.3)	59.7 (15.4)	49.5 (9.7)	69.3 (20.7)
Daily mean °F (°C)	37.8 (3.2)	41.6 (5.3)	49.9 (9.9)	59.8 (15.4)	68.8 (20.4)	76.6 (24.8)	79.2 (26.2)	77.9 (25.5)	71.5 (21.9)	60.5 (15.8)	49.5 (9.7)	41.1 (5.1)	59.5 (15.3)
Mean daily minimum °F (°C)	29.1 (−1.6)	32.5 (0.3)	40.2 (4.6)	49.5 (9.7)	59.3 (15.2)	67.2 (19.6)	69.7 (20.9)	67.6 (19.8)	60.2 (15.7)	48.8 (9.3)	39.3 (4.1)	32.7 (0.4)	49.7 (9.8)
Mean minimum °F (°C)	11.6 (−11.3)	15.2 (−9.3)	21.7 (−5.7)	33.1 (0.6)	43.6 (6.4)	56.1 (13.4)	60.1 (15.6)	56.1 (13.4)	47.6 (8.7)	32.8 (0.4)	22.7 (−5.2)	18.4 (−7.6)	9.0 (−12.8)
Record low °F (°C)	0 (−18)	6 (−14)	2 (−17)	23 (−5)	36 (2)	50 (10)	53 (12)	48 (9)	40 (4)	27 (−3)	14 (−10)	−3 (−19)	−3 (−19)
Average precipitation inches (mm)	4.23 (107)	4.26 (108)	5.22 (133)	4.72 (120)	5.44 (138)	4.53 (115)	3.53 (90)	3.83 (97)	3.76 (96)	3.83 (97)	4.87 (124)	5.38 (137)	53.60 (1,361)
Average snowfall inches (cm)	1.3 (3.3)	1.5 (3.8)	0.7 (1.8)	0.0 (0.0)	0.0 (0.0)	0.0 (0.0)	0.0 (0.0)	0.0 (0.0)	0.0 (0.0)	0.0 (0.0)	0.0 (0.0)	0.2 (0.51)	3.7 (9.4)
Average precipitation days (≥ 0.01 in)	8.1	7.8	9.8	9.1	9.9	7.1	6.9	6.6	5.7	7.5	7.8	8.9	95.2
Average snowy days (≥ 0.1 in)	0.9	0.8	0.2	0.0	0.0	0.0	0.0	0.0	0.0	0.0	0.1	0.1	2.1
Source 1: NOAA
Source 2: National Weather Service (mean maxima/minima 2006–2020)

== Demographics ==
Historical population
Census	Pop.	Note	%±
1880	276		—
1890	340		23.2%
1920	720		—
1930	907		26.0%
1940	1,137		25.4%
1950	1,501		32.0%
1960	1,665		10.9%
1970	2,499		50.1%
1980	2,615		4.6%
1990	2,426		−7.2%
2000	2,392		−1.4%
2010	2,461		2.9%
2020	2,336		−5.1%

=== 2020 census ===
Alamo racial composition
Race	Num.	Perc.
White (non-Hispanic)	1,515	64.85%
Black or African American (non-Hispanic)	361	15.45%
Native American	1	0.04%
Asian	2	0.09%
Other/Mixed	78	3.34%
Hispanic or Latino	379	16.22%

As of the 2020 United States census, there were 2,336 people, 835 households, and 505 families residing in the town.

=== 2000 census ===
As of the census of 2000, there were 2,392 people, 945 households, and 605 families residing in the town. The population density was 1,112.5 inhabitants per square mile (429.5/km^{2}). There were 1,076 housing units at an average density of 500.5 per square mile (193.2/km^{2}). The racial makeup of the town was 76.25% White, 21.32% African American, 0.13% Native American, 0.13% Asian, 1.42% from other races, and 0.75% from two or more races. Hispanic or Latino of any race were 2.34% of the population.

There were 945 households, out of which 28.7% had children under the age of 18 living with them, 45.0% were married couples living together, 16.1% had a female householder with no husband present, and 35.9% were non-families. 33.3% of all households were made up of individuals, and 18.2% had someone living alone who was 65 years of age or older. The average household size was 2.35 and the average family size was 2.98.

In the town, the population was spread out, with 23.8% under the age of 18, 8.1% from 18 to 24, 25.9% from 25 to 44, 20.2% from 45 to 64, and 22.0% who were 65 years of age or older. The median age was 39 years. For every 100 females, there were 81.9 males. For every 100 females age 18 and over, there were 79.5 males.

The median income for a household in the town was $25,750, and the median income for a family was $38,295. Males had a median income of $26,167 versus $21,650 for females. The per capita income for the town was $14,146. About 16.1% of families and 20.5% of the population were below the poverty line, including 22.9% of those under age 18 and 23.8% of those age 65 or over.
