= Tennessee State Route 461 =

State highway in Tennessee, United States

State Route 461
- The Trace
- TN 461 highlighted in red

Route information
- Maintained by TDOT
- Length: 3.1 mi (5.0 km)

Major junctions
- South end: US 79 in Dover
- North end: The Trace at Land Between the Lakes National Recreation Area

Location
- Country: United States
- State: Tennessee
- Counties: Stewart

Highway system
- Tennessee State Routes; Interstate; US; State
← SR 460	→ SR 462

State Route 461 (SR 461) is a state highway located entirely in Stewart County, Tennessee.

== Route description ==
SR 461 begins at an intersection with US 79 with unsigned companion SR 76 in Dover. It travels north, and after three miles (4.8 km), it enters the Land Between the Lakes National Recreation Area (LBL) and meets its northern terminus just inside the park boundary. The road continues as The Trace. The highway is part of the National Scenic Byway system.

== History ==
Until the 2000s, SR 461 was signed as SR 49. Although the road south of the LBL boundary became designated as SR 461 after the U.S. Forest Service took over ownership of LBL, some road maps still identify the entire Tennessee section of the trace as SR 49.

== Junction list ==
The entire route is in Stewart County.

Location	mi	km	Destinations	Notes
Dover	0.0	0.0	US 79 (Donelson Parkway/Austin Peay Memorial Highway/SR 76) – Dover, Fort Donelson National Battlefield, Paris Landing, Paris	Southern terminus
Land Between the Lakes National Recreation Area	3.0	4.8	The Trace (FD-100) – Grand Rivers	Northern terminus, road continues solely as The Trace
1.000 mi = 1.609 km; 1.000 km = 0.621 mi
