= The Trace (Land Between the Lakes) =

Scenic road in Kentucky and Tennessee, United States

Woodlands Trace National Scenic Byway
- The Trace; FD-100
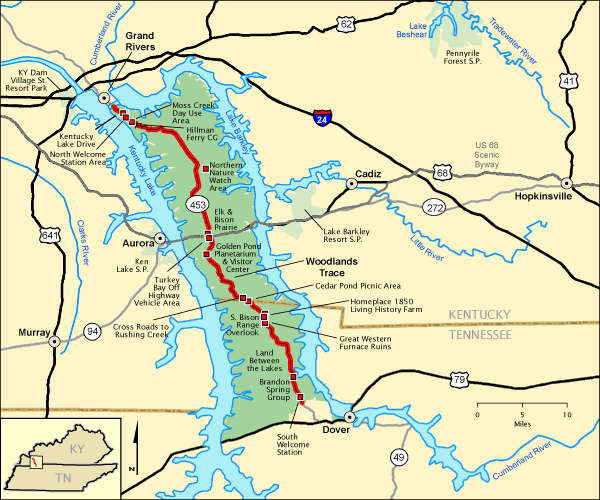

Route information
- Length: 43.1 mi (69.4 km)

Major junctions
- South end: SR 461 at the south entrance northwest of Dover, TN
- US 68 / KY 80 near the Golden Pond Visitor Center
- North end: KY 453 at the north entrance near Grand Rivers, KY

Location
- Country: United States
- States: Tennessee, Kentucky
- Counties: TN: Stewart; KY: Lyon, Trigg

Highway system
- Scenic Byways; National; National Forest; BLM; NPS

The Woodlands Trace National Scenic Byway, also known as "The Trace," is the major north–south roadway that traverses the Land Between the Lakes National Recreation Area in two counties in western Kentucky and northwestern Stewart County in northwest Middle Tennessee. It is estimated to be 43.1 miles (69.4 km) in length. The road is part of the National Scenic Byway system. Although it is not signed, it is listed on LBL's road logs as FD-100.

== Description ==
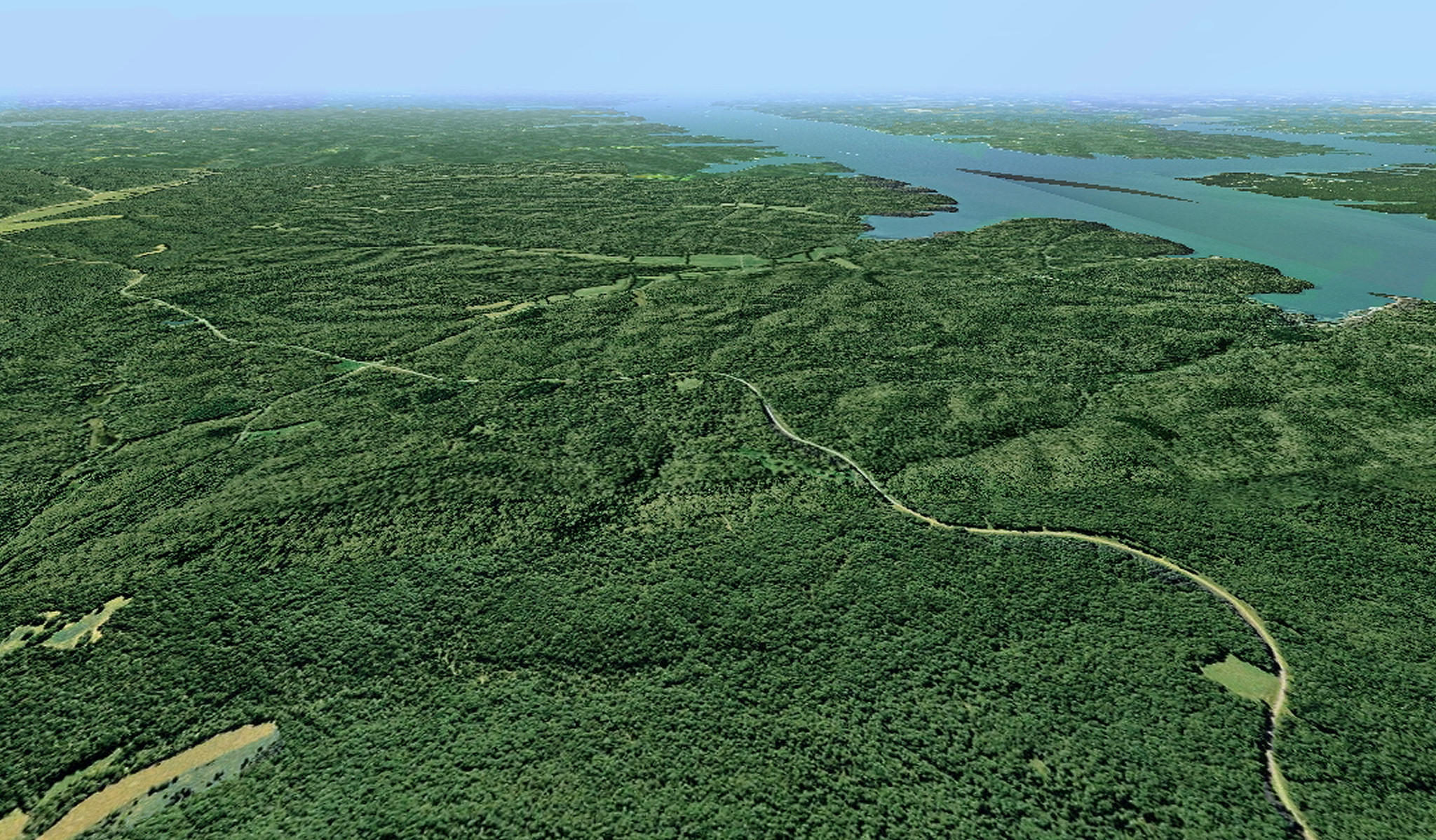
The Trace running through Land Between the Lakes National Recreation Area in southern Kentucky

The road is called "The Trace", which is what many roads and paths were called in pioneer times. "Trace" is short for "Buffalo Trace" that many winding roads have been called since they seem to follow the winding path of buffalo or bison.

=== Stewart County, Tennessee ===
The Trace begins as Tennessee State Route 461 (SR 461, locally known as The Trace Road) at the intersection with US 79 (running concurrently with a hidden designation of SR 76) on the western outskirts of Dover in Stewart County, Tennessee. SR 461 ends at the southern boundary of the Land Between the Lakes National Recreation Area, but continues solely as the Trace. The recreation area is situated on an inland peninsula between Kentucky Lake (the Tennessee River) and Lake Barkley (the Cumberland River). It passes through the sites of the defunct towns of Tharpe and Model, the latter of which is home to the remnants of an old furnace, as well as the 1850s Homeplace living history farm before the road makes its entry into Kentucky at the state line.

=== Between the state line and U.S. 68 ===
It enters Trigg County shortly after passing the Homeplace. It passes through more wooded areas and has two intersections with back-country roads, including one of which leads to the Wrangler's Campground, the premier destination for horseback riding and camping within the recreation area. After passing the Golden Pond Visitor Center and Planetarium, the Trace has a freeway-style diamond interchange junction with the co-signed four-lane U.S. Route 68 and Kentucky Route 80. US 68/KY 80 was formerly accessed from The Trace via an access road near the visitor center and planetarium. The diamond interchange was built when US 68/KY 80 was widened within LBL in the early 2010s as part of the widening project of the route in Trigg County.

=== North of U.S. 68 ===
The Trace goes further north and passes the Elk and Bison Prairie, and other roads that link the Trace to more recreational areas, campgrounds, and one that leads to the Woodlands Nature Station after crossing into the Lyon County section of the recreation area. The Trace reaches its northern end at the Between the Rivers Memorial Bridge on the LBL's northern boundary just short of the Lyon-Livingston County line.

The rest of the road beyond the bridge is signed as Kentucky Route 453 (KY 453) from the northern end of the bridge, through Grand Rivers, all the way to Smithland, Kentucky. Access to US 62/641 and Interstate 24 (I-24) at Exit 31 is available just north of Grand Rivers well into Livingston County.

== History ==
The segment of the trace between the state line and US 68 was originally signed as KY 289 during the late 1940s and 1950s. Shortly before the Land Between the Lakes National Recreation Area (LBL) was established, the Kentucky segment of the Trace was originally designated as Kentucky Route 453 (KY 453), and the Tennessee segment was Tennessee State Route 49 (SR 49). The complete roadway from US 79 in the south to the bridge near Grand Rivers in the north was completed at some time between 1957 and 1961; this allowed for KY 453 to be extended to the state line from near Grand Rivers. Both KY 453 and SR 49 were decommissioned from the Trace after the LBL was acquired by the USDA's Forest Service from the Tennessee Valley Authority, the previous owner of the recreation area. However, some road maps published after the 2000s still identify The Trace as KY 453 and SR 49.

The recreation area itself, however, was established in 1963 after the TVA built the Kentucky Dam and the U.S. Army Corps of Engineers impounded the Cumberland River to build the other dam that created Lake Barkley. The state road designations remained until the forest service's acquisition of the recreation area.

== Major intersections ==
State	County	Location	mi	km	Destinations	Notes
Tennessee	Stewart	Dover	0.0	0.0	US 79 – Paris, Dover, Clarksville, Fort Donelson National Battlefield	Southern terminus of The Trace Road and SR 461; southern end of the SR 461 overlap
Tennessee	Stewart	Land Between the Lakes National Recreation Area	3.0	4.8	Southern entrance of Land Between The Lakes SR 461 south The Trace	Southern terminus; northern end of SR 461 overlap
Tennessee	Stewart	Land Between the Lakes National Recreation Area			FD-300	Accesses Piney Campground
Tennessee	Stewart	Land Between the Lakes National Recreation Area			The Homeplace	
			0.000	0.000	Tennessee–Kentucky state line	
Kentucky	Trigg	Land Between the Lakes National Recreation Area			FD-172 west / FD-165 north (Laura Furnace Road)	FD-165 accesses the Wranglers Campground
Kentucky	Trigg	Golden Pond			FD-165 south (Laura Furnace Road)	Access Wranglers Campground
Kentucky	Trigg	Golden Pond			Golden Pond Visitors Center; Golden Pond Observatory and Planetarium	
Kentucky	Trigg	Land Between the Lakes National Recreation Area			US 68 / KY 80 – Aurora, Murray, Cadiz, Hopkinsville	Interchange-style junction
Kentucky	Trigg	Land Between the Lakes National Recreation Area			Elk and Bison Prairie Road	
Kentucky	Lyon	Land Between the Lakes National Recreation Area			FD-135 east	Accesses Woodlands Nature Station and Nature Watch Area
Kentucky	Lyon	Land Between the Lakes National Recreation Area			FD-133 east (Silver Trail Road)	Accesses Woodlands Nature Station and Nature Watch Area
Kentucky	Lyon	Land Between the Lakes National Recreation Area			FD-114 west / FD-117 east (Old Ferry Road)	Accesses Birmingham Ferry Recreation Area and Campground and the Eddyville Ferry Landing; formerly KY 58.
Kentucky	Lyon	Land Between the Lakes National Recreation Area			FD-110 west (Hillman Ferry Road)	Accesses Hillman Ferry Campground
Kentucky	Lyon	Grand Rivers	43.1	69.4	KY 453 north to I-24 – Grand Rivers, Smithland	End of the Trace; continues as KY-453. Between the Rivers Bridge just short of the Livingston County line.
1.000 mi = 1.609 km; 1.000 km = 0.621 mi: Concurrency terminus
