= Kentucky Route 453 =

State highway in Kentucky, United States

Kentucky Route 453
- KY 453 highlighted in red

Route information
- Maintained by KYTC
- Length: 16.040 mi (25.814 km)

Major junctions
- South end: Land Between the Lakes National Recreation Area north entrance / The Trace near Grand Rivers
- US 62 / US 641 near Grand Rivers; I-24 / I-69 near Grand Rivers
- North end: US 60 / North Court Street in Smithland

Location
- Country: United States
- State: Kentucky
- Counties: Lyon, Livingston

Highway system
- Kentucky State Highway System; Interstate; US; State; Parkways
← KY 452	→ KY 454

Kentucky Route 453 (KY 453) is a 16.040-mile-long (25.814 km) state highway in Kentucky that runs from The Trace at the northern entrance of Land Between the Lakes National Recreation Area south of Grand Rivers to U.S. Route 60 and North Court Street in Smithland.

== Route description ==
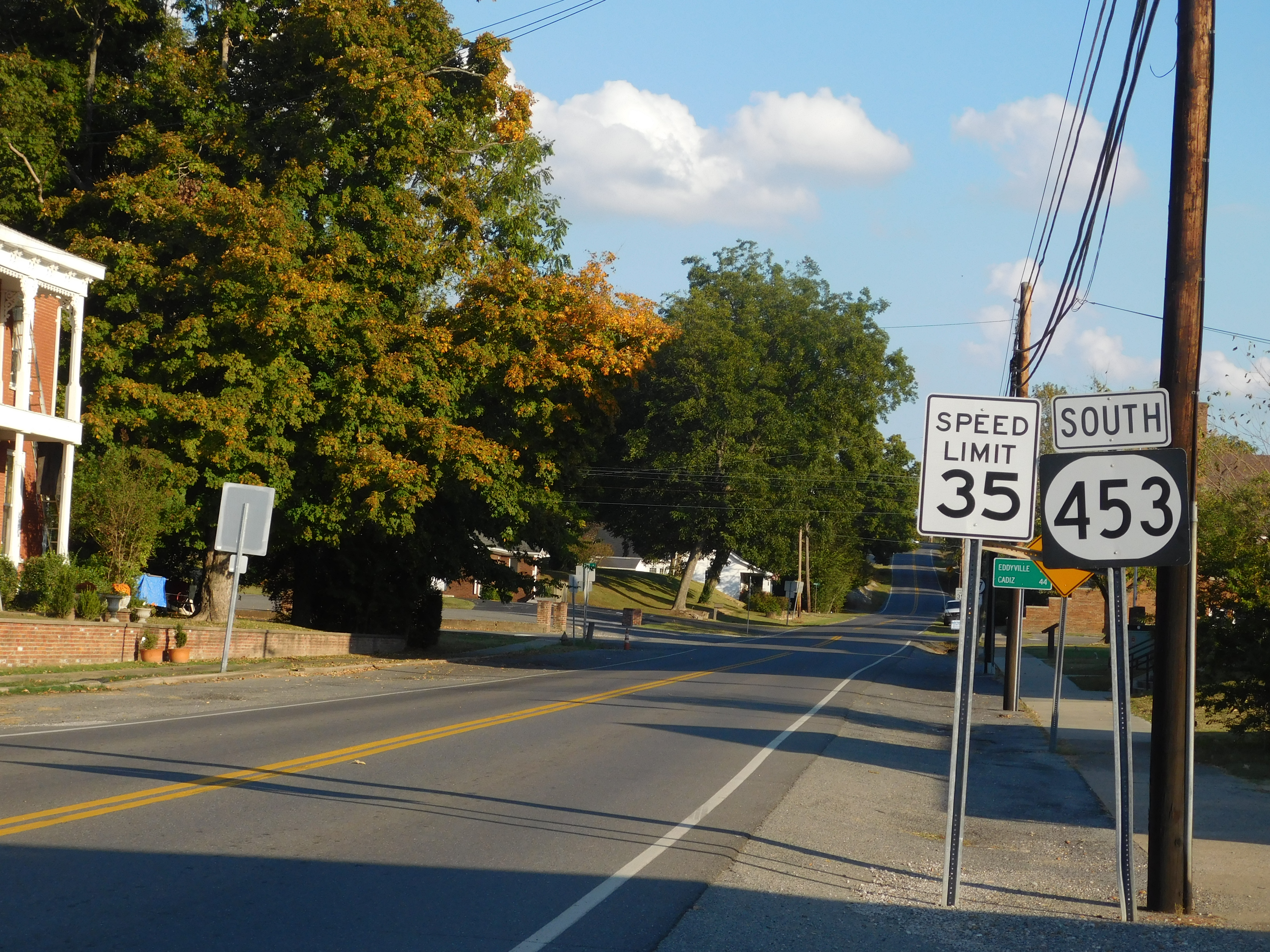
KY 453 in Smithland

KY 453 starts in Smithland in Livingston County at an intersection with U.S. Route 60 (US 60). It goes on a southeasterly path out of town, and has an intersection with Interstate 24 (I-24)/Interstate 69 (I-69), and then US 62 and US 641 in the Lake City–Grand Rivers vicinity, the village between the two lakes, Lake Barkley (Cumberland River) to the east, and Kentucky Lake (Tennessee River) to the west. The highway ends at the bridge over the canal connecting the lakes just south of the county line into Lyon County, for the road continuing south of that bridge enters the U.S. Forest Service-owned Land Between the Lakes National Recreation Area, and becomes "The Trace".

== History ==
The highway between Smithland and the area just west of Iuka was originally a part of KY 50 from 1929 until sometime in the mid-1930s, US 62 until the mid-1950s, and KY 93 until sometime before 1970, while the rest of the route to the present-day US 62/641 alignment was signed as KY 482. KY 453 was extended to its pre-2000 length in 1967.

KY 453 was extended south to the US 68 corridor just west of Golden Pond sometime around 1956. KY 453 would later be extended south of US 68 to the Tennessee state line between 1957 and 1960, replacing the original KY 289 designation in that area.

Before the Land Between The Lakes Recreation Area was in the hands of the USDA, the Tennessee Valley Authority owned the recreation area, and KY 453 continued southward through the area to the Tennessee state line.

== Major intersections ==
County	Location	mi	km	Destinations	Notes
Lyon		0.000	0.000	Land Between the Lakes National Recreation Area north entrance / The Trace south	Southern terminus; continues as The Trace beyond entrance
Livingston		3.372– 3.393	5.427– 5.461	US 62 / US 641	Interchange
Livingston		4.775– 4.800	7.685– 7.725	I-24 / I-69 – Paducah, Nashville	I-24/I-69 exit 31
Livingston		4.967	7.994	Forrest Road (KY 6004 west)	Eastern terminus of KY 6004
Livingston		5.688	9.154	KY 2225 north (Jake Dukes Road)	Southern terminus of KY 2225
Livingston		8.681	13.971	KY 93 south (Iuka Road)	Northern terminus of KY 93
Livingston		10.065	16.198	KY 1889 north (Heater Store Road) / Bloodworth Road	Southern terminus of KY 1889
Livingston		11.731	18.879	KY 937 west (Cutoff Road)	Eastern terminus of KY 937
Livingston	Smithland	15.942	25.656	KY 967 south (Wilson Avenue)	South end of KY 967 overlap
Livingston	Smithland	15.964	25.692	KY 967 north (State Street)	North end of KY 967 overlap
Livingston	Smithland	16.040	25.814	US 60 (Adair Street) / North Court Street	Northern terminus; continues as North Court Street beyond US 60
1.000 mi = 1.609 km; 1.000 km = 0.621 mi: Concurrency terminus
