= List of ghost towns in Tennessee =

This is an incomplete List of ghost towns in Tennessee.

- "Old" Butler
- Cades Cove
- Cute
- Devonia
- Elkmont
- Fork Mountain
- Hopewell
- Loyston
- Model
- Morganton
- No Business
- Olympus
- Rhea Springs
- Tharpe
- Wasp
- Wheat
- Willow Grove
