= Tharpe, Tennessee =

Tharpe
- Unincorporated community
- Location within the state of Tennessee
- Coordinates: 36°33′36.19″N 87°57′30.10″W
- Country: United States
- State: Tennessee
- County: Stewart
- Elevation: 384 ft (117 m)
- Time zone: UTC-6 (Central (CST))
  - Summer (DST): UTC-5 (CST)
- ZIP codes: 37058
- Area code: 931
- GNIS feature ID: 1272360

Tharpe was an unincorporated community in Stewart County, Tennessee, United States. The community was one of several communities and towns in the general area that has become a part of the Land Between the Lakes National Recreation Area.

== History ==
The community was originally known as Iron Mountain, named for the furnace of that name that went in operation in 1854 due to the discovery of local iron ore deposits. Fifty years prior, the first settlers in the area along Barrett Creek consisted of two families named Gatlin and Scarborough. Iron Mountain Furnace was in operation until sometime in 1855, when it closed; it would be purchased by the Ledbetter & Bostick Company five years later, and would operate it until the late 1860s, shortly after the American Civil War, when the Cincinnati Copperage Company purchased it, along with several other furnaces in the Stewart County area. During the Civil War, financial hardships were endured by many households in the area due to some of the men having joined the 50th Tennessee Regiment in order to defend Fort Donelson during the February 1862 battle in which the Union won.

The Iron Mountain post office was established on July 25, 1856. The name of the post office and the town was changed to Tharpe on March 22, 1886; it was named for local businessman Hannible Allentharpe (or Ham Tharpe, for short), who would start a business in the community. That business led the community to also host a general store, a school, a church, a cotton gin, a doctor's clinic (that building is still standing), and by 1915, would also be accompanied by a gristmill, a few sawmills, a blacksmith shop and a tobacco prizing factory.

During the Great Depression, the population of the company began to decline due to many people needing to find work. The community's post office ended operations in 1942. Any residents that remain afterwards eventually relocated no later than 1970, as the Tennessee Valley Authority purchased the land in the area to create the Land Between the Lakes National Recreation Area.

== Geography ==
Tharpe was located about 12 miles (19 km) northwest of Dover around the intersection of Tharpe Road (LBL Forest Roads 221 and 384) and the Woodlands Trace National Scenic Byway, the latter of which was originally signed as Tennessee State Route 49 (SR 49) at the time of the town's existence. The byway connects with Dover to the southeast and the Kentucky state line about 8 miles (13 km) to the north. The town site was located near the present-day location of the Brandon Spring Group Center.
