= Bear Spring, Tennessee =

Unincorporated community in Tennessee, United States

Bear Spring
- Unincorporated community
- Location within Tennessee Location within the United States
- Coordinates: 36°28′31″N 87°45′17″W
- Country: United States
- State: Tennessee
- County: Stewart
- Elevation: 404 ft (123 m)
- Time zone: UTC-6 (Central (CST))
  - Summer (DST): UTC-5 (CDT)
- Area code: 931
- GNIS feature ID: 1305021

Bear Spring is an unincorporated community in Stewart County, Tennessee, in the United States.

== History ==
In 1830, the Bear Spring Iron Furnace was constructed, serving as the first charcoal cold-blast furnace in the area. At its peak work rate in 1850, the furnace could produce over 2000 tons of metal. The furnace closed down in 1854 and was destroyed by Union Troops in 1864. It was reconstructed at its current location in 1873, where it has remained ever since.

A post office called Bear Spring was established in 1893, and remained in operation until it was discontinued in 1948. According to local history, the community was so named when a pioneer settler shot a bear in a nearby spring.
