= Big Rock, Tennessee =

- Unincorporated community
- Location within Tennessee Location within the United States
- Coordinates: 36°34′50″N 87°45′36″W
- Country: United States
- State: Tennessee
- County: Stewart

Area
  - Total: 1.72 sq mi (4.46 km^{2})
  - Land: 1.72 sq mi (4.46 km^{2})
  - Water: 0 sq mi (0.00 km^{2})
- Elevation: 525 ft (160 m)

Population (2020)
  - Total: 291
  - Density: 169.2/sq mi (65.31/km^{2})
- Time zone: UTC-6 (Central (CST))
  - Summer (DST): UTC-5 (CDT)
- ZIP code: 37023
- Area code: 931
- GNIS feature ID: 1305229

Big Rock is an unincorporated community in Stewart County, Tennessee, United States. Its ZIP code is 37023.

== Demographics ==
Historical population
Census	Pop.	Note	%±
2020	291		—
U.S. Decennial Census
