= Birmingham, Kentucky =

Former settlement in Kentucky, United States

Coordinates: 36°54′47″N 88°11′53″W

Birmingham was a town in Marshall County, Kentucky, that was destroyed by the creation of Kentucky Lake.

== History ==
=== 19th century ===
Birmingham was located on land owned by Thomas A. Grubbs in 1849, laid out and platted in 1853 and incorporated in 1860. Early residents included L. S. Locker, Thomas Love and Thomas C. Grubbs. Birmingham enjoyed prosperity shortly after the end of the Civil War when a stave mill and timber business employed over 200 people. Birmingham was named after Birmingham, England in hope that the city would establish its European namesake's iron industry; the area had its own nascent iron industry, some remains of which can be viewed today in the Land Between the Lakes. Collins' History of Kentucky states that in 1874 Birmingham had a population of 322; by contrast, the county seat of Benton, Kentucky then had a population of only 158. By 1894, Birmingham had five churches, two schools, two hotels, four dry goods and general stores, three grocers, two millinery shops, two wagon and blacksmith shops, and a drug store.

=== 20th century ===
The Birmingham Marshall County Kentucky Night Riders succeeded in forcing almost all of the black residents to leave several small communities in southwest Kentucky.

The two main targets, suffering repeated assaults, were black people in the small communities of Golden Pond in Trigg County and Birmingham in Marshall County. Economic motives lay behind the attacks. Black people owned good farm lands or were employed by the tobacco trust. Since the end of the Civil War, Afro-Americans had lived in Birmingham, a port town on the Tennessee River. Commenting on this predominantly black area, the Courier-Journal explained, “Birmingham has some of the best farming land in the Purchase, and around there is to be found practically the entire Negro population of Marshall County.” (Louisville Courier-Journal, March 11, 1908)

Attacks on black people in Birmingham began in February, 1908. Towards the end of the month, after having suffered through several raids, community leaders finally went to the authorities, pleading in vain for protection. They had been told to leave Birmingham but had refused to do so, and the mob now resorted to murder, apparently concluding that it would take more than a few warning signs and small brush fires to oust the entrenched African Americans.

In addition to being landowners, some of the black population worked at the tobacco factory in the county, which further incensed the Night Riders. Officials of the tobacco company were warned to fire all Negro hands but had likewise failed to act. As a reporter for the Courier-Journal accurately predicted, the unwillingness of law officers to intervene sealed the fate of the black population: “Apparently encouraged by the failure of Marshall County officials to prosecute whitecaps who have warned and whipped blacks, 100 men road into Birmingham on March 8, and shot seven men and whipped five others.”

John Scruggs and his granddaughter died from wounds sustained during the raid. All of the local black people were given another warning to sell their lands, resolve all of their personal and financial matters, and leave Birmingham within ten days. Most of them soon left for Paducah or Nashville, and in their rush for safety they left behind household goods and farm equipment. A final story concerning them appeared in the Courier-Journal toward the end of March: “Only six blacks remain since the notices to leave town were posted. A steamer from Marshall County brought in seventeen black families and their household goods. In all about 100 blacks got off the steamer when it arrived in Tennessee.” (Ibid., March 11, 17, 24, 28, 1908; Madisonville Hustler, March 17, 1908)

Shortly after their successful removal of the black population, the Night Riders adopted the practice that seems to have been widespread in Kentucky during the first two decades of the twentieth century and posted a sign near the railroad station in Marshall County telling anyone who somehow remained uninformed about the ousting of black people that their community was for whites only.

The words "Niggers Don't Let the Sun Set on You" were clear in their meaning; and against the backdrop of the destruction of property, whippings, and murders, these words must have invoked fear in Afro-Americans venturing in the county. Since the raid, Marshall County has had a reputation as a place where no black folks live, though this has actually become the case only in the last few decades. (Racial Violence in Kentucky, 1865–1940: Lynchings, Mob Rule, and "Legal Lynchings", pp. 137–138, by George C. Wright. Louisiana State University Press, Baton Rouge and London 1990).

Birmingham forcibly drove out its African American population by 1908, becoming a sundown town. By 1929, Birmingham still had around 600 residents. The Tennessee Valley Authority announced the building of Kentucky Dam for the creation of Kentucky Lake in 1938, and at that time Birmingham's residents were informed that they must relocate. The TVA commenced land purchases in 1942. The dam was completed in 1944, and the entirety of Birmingham was submerged under the resulting lake, the largest manmade lake in the world at the time. Some residents of Birmingham had to relocate a second time due to the creation of Lake Barkley.

When the water in Kentucky Lake is low, the remains of foundations and streets of Birmingham are often visible, especially at Birmingham Point.

== Geography ==
Birmingham was located in eastern Marshall County, Kentucky along the Tennessee River. It was located about 8 miles (13 km) east-northeast of Benton. Kentucky Route 58 was the primary thoroughfare in and out of town; it connected with areas of southern Lyon County to the east via ferry service, and to the west with the Benton area.

== Notable people ==
NBA star Joe Fulks was born in Birmingham.
