= Cross Creeks National Wildlife Refuge =

- IUCN category IV (habitat/species management area)
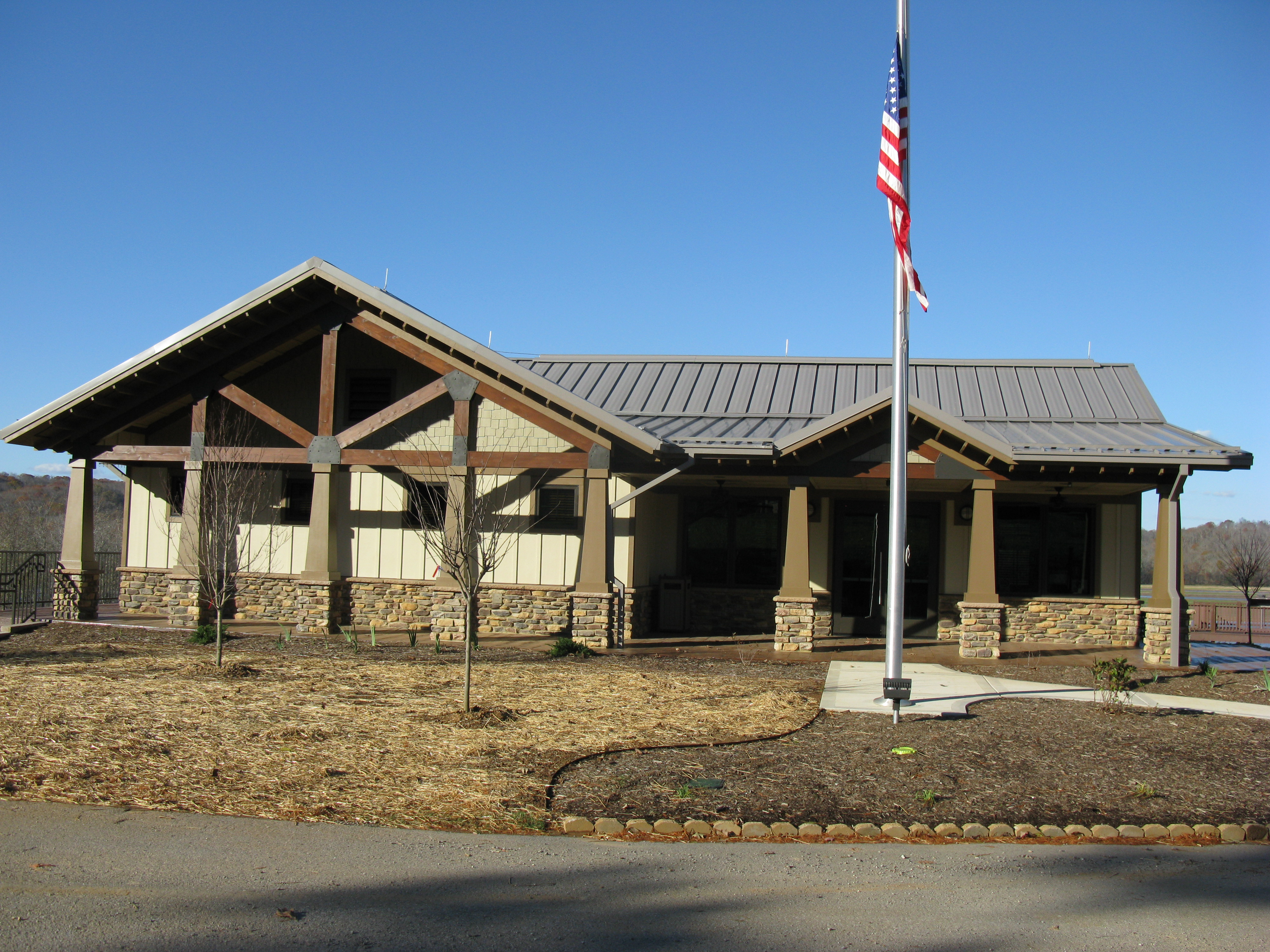
- Visitor center

- Location within the United States
- Location: Stewart County, Tennessee, United States
- Nearest city: Dover, Tennessee
- Coordinates: 36°28′00″N 87°44′00″W
- Area: 8,862 acres (35.86 km^{2})
- Established: 1962
- Governing body: U.S. Fish and Wildlife Service
- Website: Cross Creeks National Wildlife Refuge

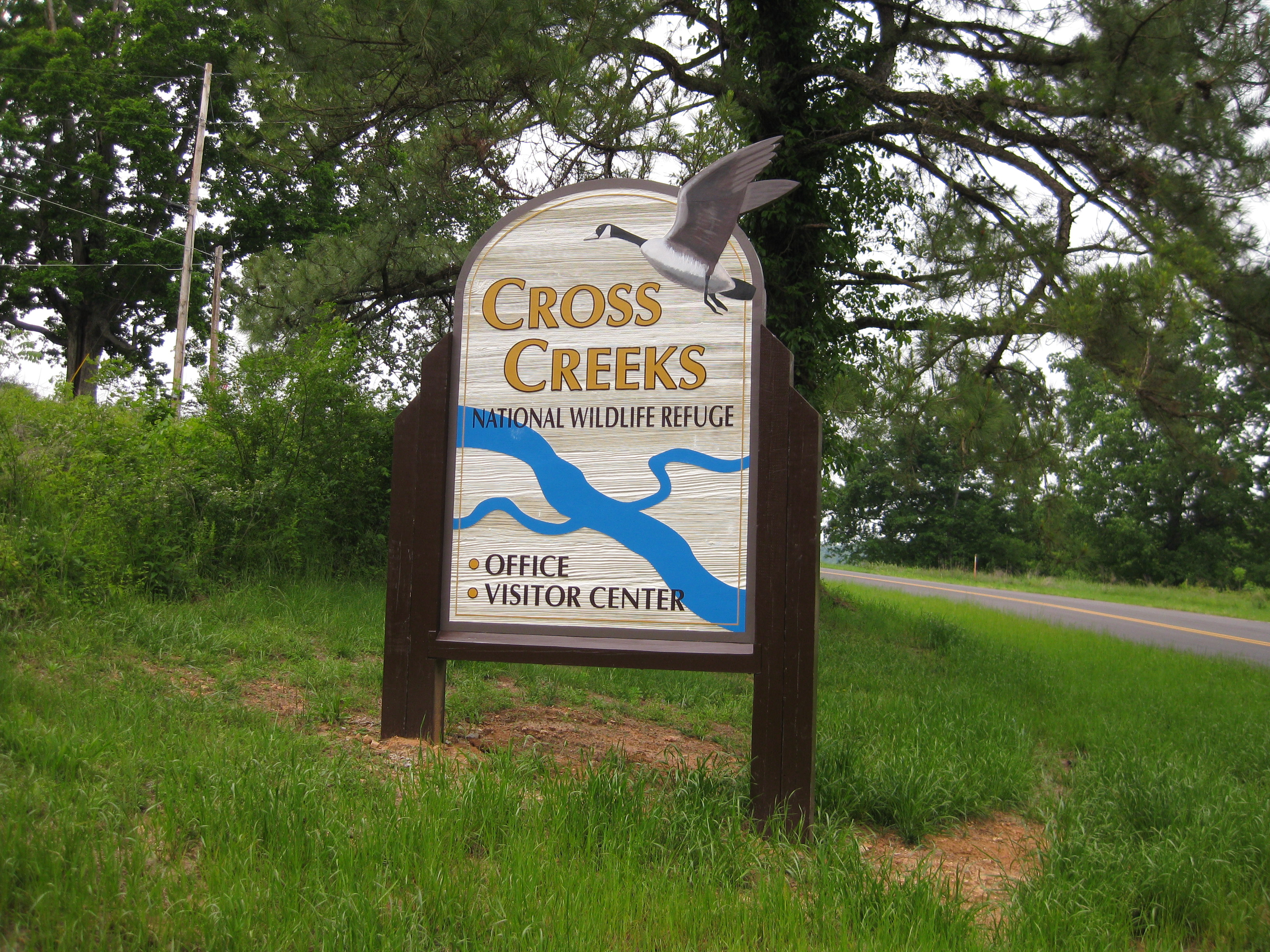

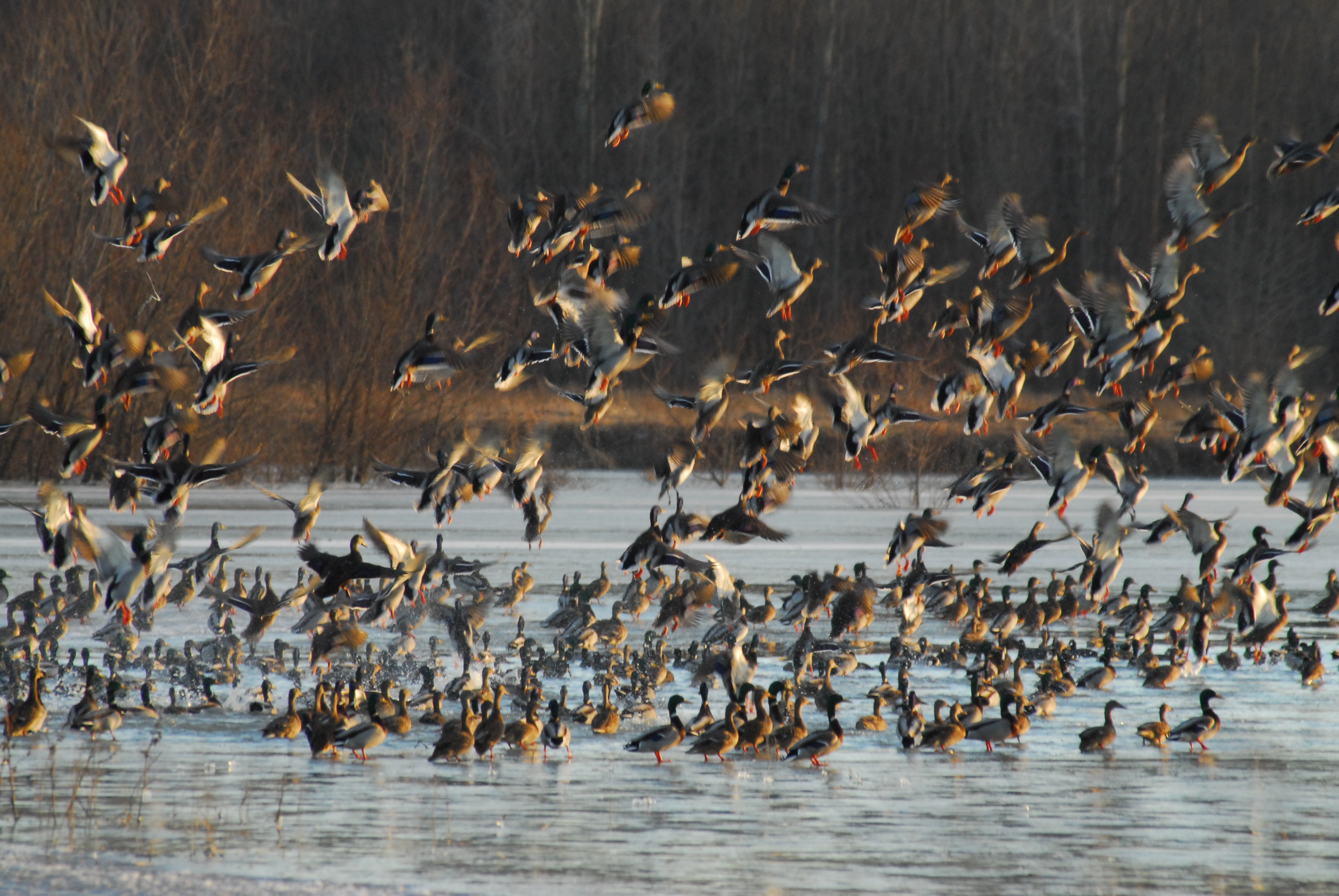
Waterfowl at Cross Creeks

Cross Creeks National Wildlife Refuge is a part of the U.S. system of National Wildlife Refuges located along the Lake Barkley impoundment of the Cumberland River in Stewart County, Tennessee near Dover, covering 8,862 acres (35.86 km^{2}). It provides habitat for a wide variety of waterfowl and aquatic plant life in what is a largely wetlands environment. Cross Creeks is the only National Wildlife Refuge located entirely in Middle Tennessee as of 2006.
