= Model, Tennessee =

Former unincorporated community in Tennessee, United States

Model
- Unincorporated community
- Location within the state of Tennessee
- Coordinates: 36°38′30″N 87°58′38″W
- Country: United States
- State: Tennessee
- County: Stewart
- Elevation: 489 ft (149 m)
- Time zone: UTC-6 (Central (CST))
  - Summer (DST): UTC-5 (CST)
- ZIP codes: 37058
- Area code: 931
- GNIS feature ID: 1648965

Model was an unincorporated community in Stewart County, Tennessee, United States. The community is one of several communities and towns in the general area that has become a part of the Land Between the Lakes National Recreation Area.

== History ==
The settlement was originally known as Pryor's Creek at its founding in the early half of the 19th century. A post office was established as Bass in July 1846, named after the area's first postmaster, Jethro Bass. It was renamed Great Western in 1854 after a furnace that was established that year, only to be fallen victim of the shut down of the furnace industry in the area due to a panic related to slave insurrection in late 1856.

In the 1860s after the American Civil War, the Cincinnati Copperage Company established the area as a real estate operation, or "model town," which is how the community got its final name in 1887. People who came to work for the furnaces in the area relocated to the area, many of whom became farmers, blacksmiths, or timber workers. The depletion of timber, along with the farming becoming less productive, has cause the town to lose population throughout much of the 1930s and 1940s, until the Tennessee Valley Authority acquired all the properties around the community to create the Land Between the Lakes National Recreation Area in 1963. While most of the families in the areas relocated to other communities by 1964, one resident, Cleo Griffin, who served in the military during the second world war and fought in the Battle of Monte Cassino in 1944, was permitted to continue to live in his family home after countless negotiations. The Griffin house continued to be occupied until 1989, when he finally relocated to a nearby nursing home, where he remained until his 2000 death; his home is currently under preservation efforts. It and the Great Western Furnace were the only remaining landmarks still standing today.

== Geography ==
Model was located at the coordinates 36.641754, −87.976829, which is about 17 miles (27 km) northwest of Dover along the Woodlands Trace National Scenic Byway, known simply as The Trace. It was originally signed as Tennessee State Route 49 at the time of the town's existence. The byway connects with Dover to the southeast and the Kentucky state line about 3 miles (4.8 km) to the north.

== Present-day points of interest ==
Near the original site of Model, there are two attractions operated by the Forest Service as part of the LBL:

- 1850s Homeplace Living History Farm
- South Bison Prairie
