= Golden Pond, Kentucky =

Golden Pond
- Ghost town
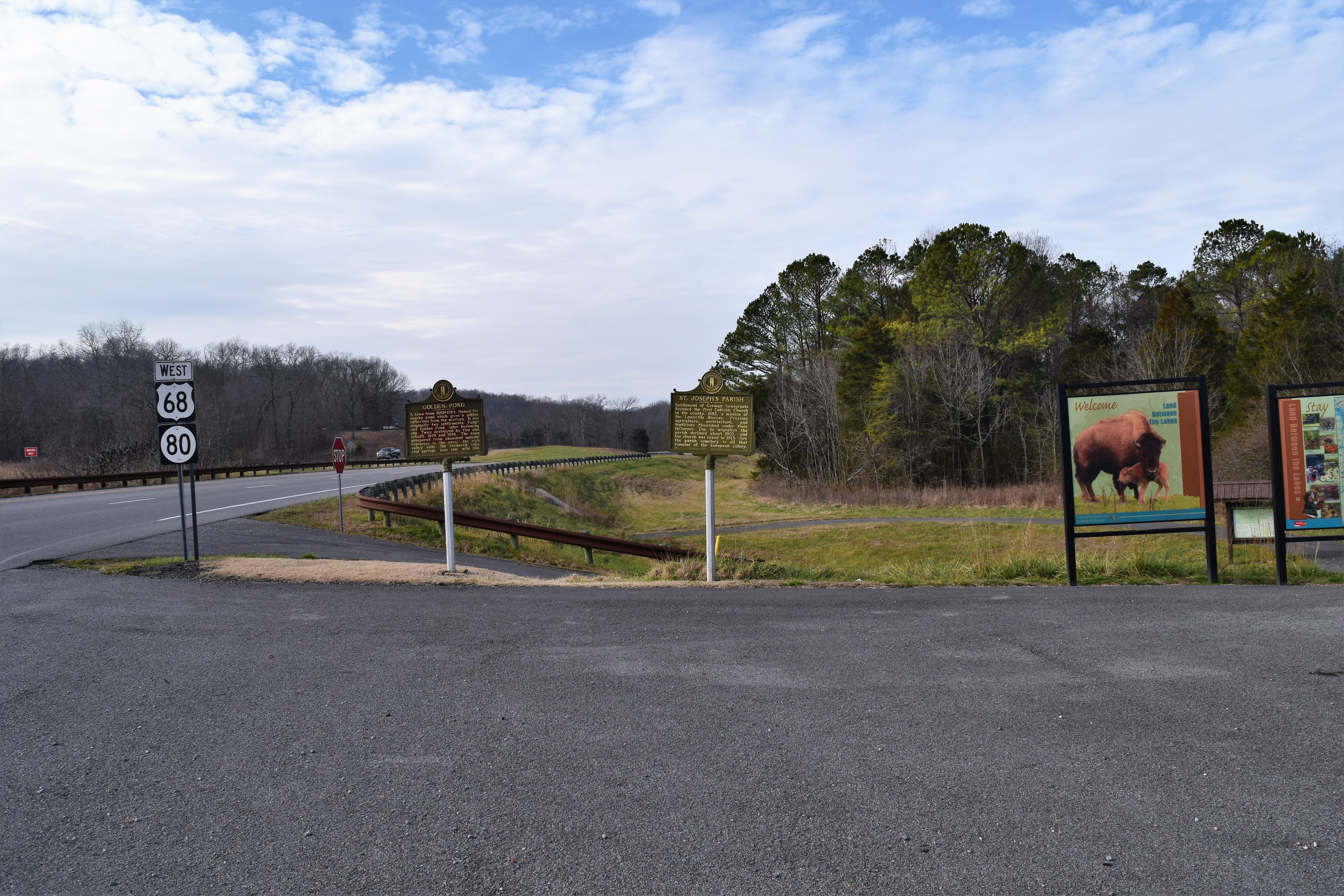
- Historic marker at the site of Golden Pond

- Location within Kentucky
- Coordinates: 36°47′08″N 88°01′27″W
- Country: United States
- State: Kentucky
- County: Trigg
- Elevation: 407 ft (124 m)
- Time zone: UTC-6 (Central (CST))
  - Summer (DST): UTC-5 (CDT)
- Postal code: 42231
- Area codes: 270 and 364
- GNIS feature ID: 508108

Golden Pond was a town in western Trigg County, Kentucky, United States. It is now the site of the headquarters of Land Between the Lakes National Recreation Area, 11 miles (18 km) west-southwest of Cadiz. Golden Pond was established in the 19th century and became known for its moonshining activity during the Prohibition era. This town was in an area altered during the 1930s and later by the Tennessee Valley Authority, which constructed dams to control flooding and generate electricity for a large rural area. The TVA evicted the last residents of Golden Pond in 1969, when the recreation area was established.

== Origin ==
Golden Pond shares its name with a pond located at 36°46′45″N 88°03′48″W, 2.25 miles (3.62 km) west of the town. The most accepted account of the name's origin says that residents named the pond when sunshine on its surface resembled melted gold. Another story, likely to be legend, says that residents named the community for a man who placed gold dust in the vicinity of the pond in an attempt to trigger a gold rush and boom in property values. Another account said that the town was purportedly named Fungo for the entertainment at the local saloon. This name may have referred to a community further west, which later merged with Golden Pond, and may never have been used at all.

== Geography ==
Golden Pond is located at 36°47′08″N 88°01′27″W, in western Kentucky near the Tennessee border. It is situated in what is now the Land Between the Lakes National Recreation Area, on a peninsula lying between Kentucky Lake and Lake Barkley. These were manmade, formed by dams on the Tennessee and Cumberland rivers, respectively; the town lies 2.5 miles (4.0 km) west of the latter lake. The two lakes isolate the peninsula from the rest of Kentucky, as the region can be accessed only via roads from Tennessee or by crossing the lakes.

U.S. Route 68 and Kentucky Route 80 pass through the community concurrently, providing access to Marshall County to the west and the remainder of Trigg County to the east. When active, Golden Pond ran for almost 1 mile (1.6 km) along this highway. Another road, known as The Trace, runs west of Golden Pond and connects the peninsula to Livingston County, Kentucky to the north and Stewart County, Tennessee to the south.

Golden Pond is 11 miles (18 km) west-southwest of Cadiz, the county seat of Trigg County. The area is served by the Cadiz post office; the name Golden Pond is still accepted by the U.S. Postal Service and is used in the recreation area's mailing address.

== History ==
The name Golden Pond was first applied to an area United States post office on December 28, 1848. The site of the post office is unknown, although it may have been near the pond of the same name. Early post offices were often operated out of stores or private homes. The town at the recognized location was established by European Americans in 1882.

The early town's economy was based on the area's natural resources, which included timber, iron ore, and fertile soil for agriculture. In 1898, a fire destroyed Golden Pond, which was subsequently rebuilt. In 1936 the town suffered a second major fire but it again rebuilt. During the Prohibition era, Golden Pond was known nationally for distilling moonshine whiskey, which was later sold in speakeasies in Midwestern cities such as Chicago, Detroit, and St. Louis.

In 1964, the Tennessee Valley Authority opened the first office for the Land Between the Lakes National Recreation Area at Golden Pond. The federal government either purchased or forcibly purchased through eminent domain all lands within the recreation area. The homes of some residents who resisted purchase were burned before completion of legal condemnation. Golden Pond's last residents left in 1969; the last residents left the peninsula in 1970. Many of the residents moved to a location in eastern Calloway County. It was named Little Golden Pond in 1989.
