= Fort Donelson National Battlefield =

Historic site in Kentucky and Tennessee, US

- IUCN category III (natural monument or feature)
- Location within Tennessee Location within the United States
- Location: Calloway County, Kentucky & Stewart County, Tennessee, USA
- Nearest city: Dover, Tennessee
- Coordinates: 36°29′14″N 87°51′39″W
- Area: 1,319 acres (5.34 km^{2})
- Established: March 26, 1928 (War Dept.); August 10, 1933 (NPS)
- Visitors: 151,151 (in 2025)
- Governing body: National Park Service
- Website: Fort Donelson National Battlefield

Fort Donelson National Battlefield preserves Fort Donelson and Fort Heiman, two sites of the American Civil War Forts Henry and Donelson Campaign, in which Union Army Brigadier General Ulysses S. Grant and Flag Officer Andrew Hull Foote captured three Confederate forts and opened two rivers, the Tennessee River and the Cumberland River, to control by the Union Navy. The commanders received national recognition for their victories in February 1862, as they were the first major Union successes of the war. The capture of Fort Donelson and its garrison by the Union led to the capture of Tennessee's capital and industrial center, Nashville, which remained in Union hands from February 25, 1862, until the end of the war, and gave the Union effective control over much of Tennessee. This struck a major blow to the Confederacy early in the war.

The main portion of the park, in Dover, Tennessee, commemorates the Battle of Fort Donelson (36°29′41″N 87°51′22″W). Fort Heiman, in nearby Calloway County, Kentucky, was a Confederate battery in the Battle of Fort Henry.

== History ==
The most vulnerable area in the Confederate defensive line in the Western Theater was the state of Kentucky. The Tennessee and Cumberland rivers were potential avenues for a Union invasion of the South through Kentucky and into Tennessee and beyond. Since Kentucky had declared neutrality, the Confederacy could not build defensive works within the state without risking alienating the local population. The local population in western and central Kentucky was pro-Confederate. Kentucky's westernmost (First) congressional district elected a secessionist and Lincoln proclaimed it to be in rebellion.

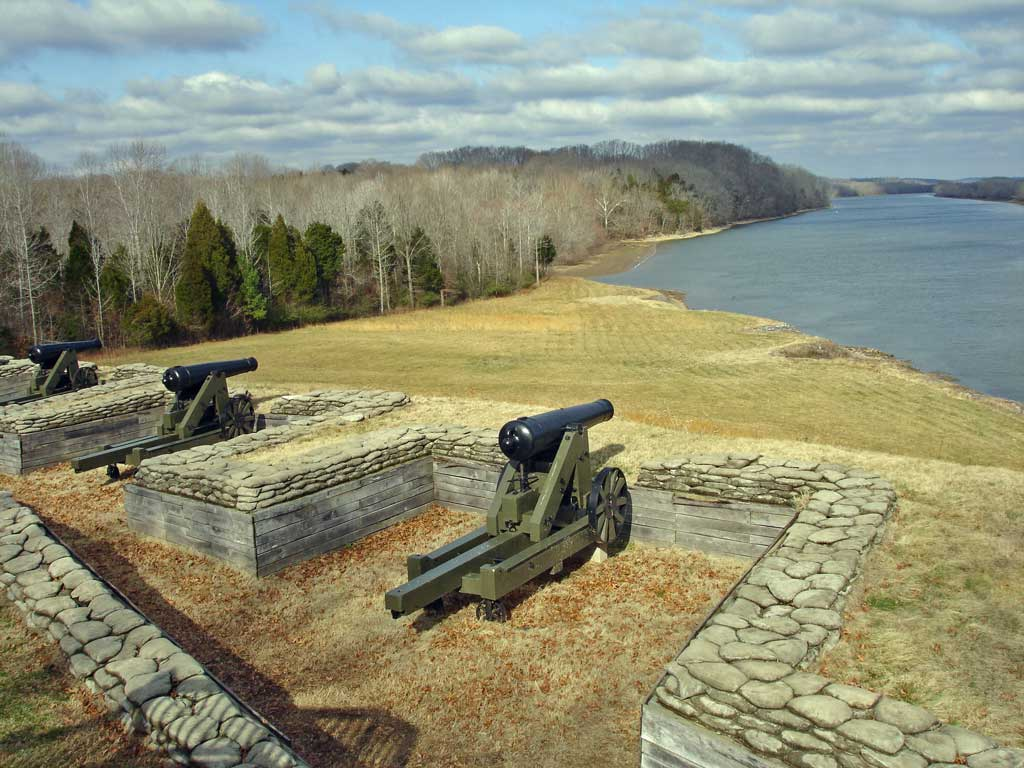
Part of the lower river battery at Fort Donelson, overlooking the Cumberland River

Adna Anderson and William F. Foster, two engineers detached from the Confederate 1st Tennessee Infantry, set to work on May 10, 1861, to find suitable ground just inside the Tennessee border to cover the two strategic rivers. They surveyed possible sites along the Cumberland River, noting the high ridges and deep hollows near the Kentucky border. In mid-May, on the west bank of the river not far below Dover, Anderson laid out the water battery of Fort Donelson, twelve miles (19 km) from the Kentucky line. The new fort was named in honor of the Confederate General Daniel S. Donelson who, along with Colonel Bushrod Johnson of the Corps of Engineers, approved of the site. Construction was begun by a large force of men brought from the nearby Cumberland Iron Works.

== Administrative history of the park ==
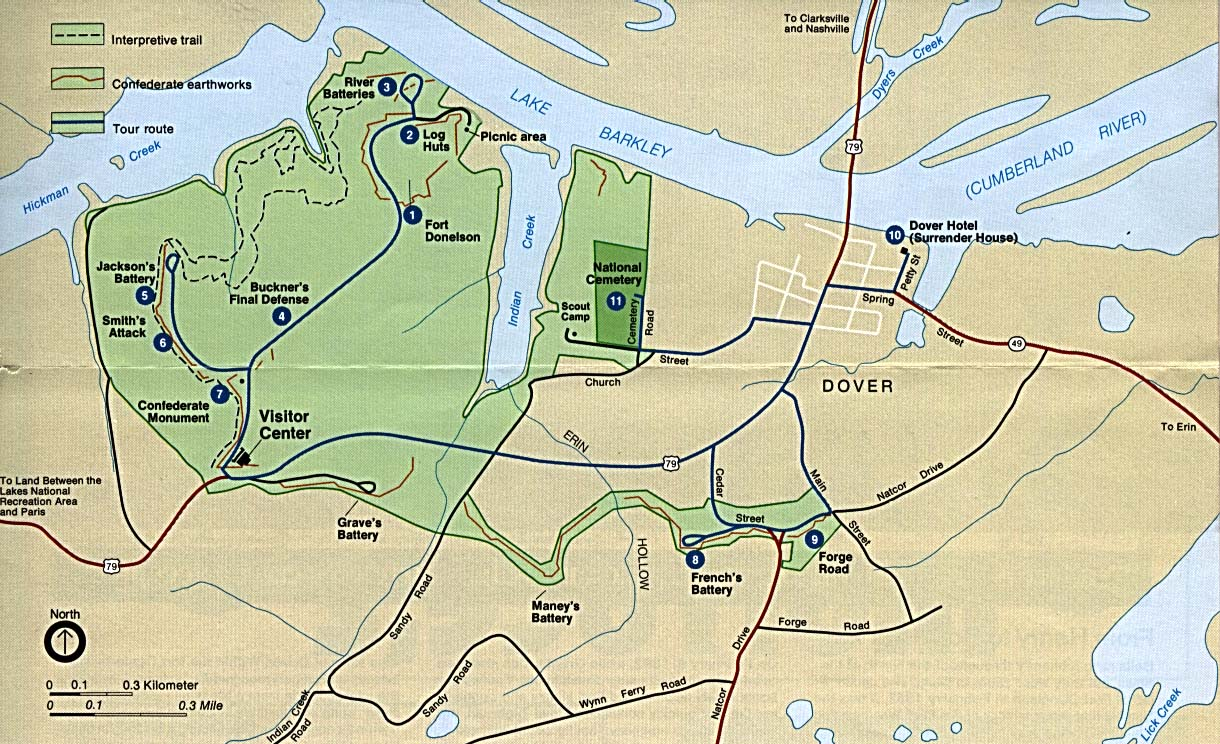
Map of Fort Donelson

The site was established as Fort Donelson National Military Park on March 26, 1928. The national military park and national cemetery were transferred from the War Department to the National Park Service on August 10, 1933. The park was listed on the National Register of Historic Places on October 15, 1966. It was redesignated a national battlefield on August 16, 1985. Public Law 108-367 (October 25, 2004) increased the authorized boundary of the national battlefield from 551.69 to 2,000 acres (2.2326 to 8.0937 km^{2}). On October 30, 2006, Calloway County transferred the Fort Heiman site, which was purchased through the Office of Kentucky Nature Preserves' Kentucky Heritage Land Conservation Fund, to the Park Service. Fort Heiman had been listed on the National Register of Historic Places on December 12, 1976.

== Park today ==
The park preserves much of the original battle site, including the river batteries and the eroded remains of the fort, but the area in which the Confederate States Army attacked on February 15, 1862, is largely in private hands and occupied by residential development. The Cumberland River was dammed in the 1960s; this area is currently referred to as Lake Barkley. It covers an area roughly similar to the original river while at flood stage, as it was during the battle. The Civil War Trust (a division of the American Battlefield Trust) and its partners have acquired and preserved 368 acres (1.49 km^{2}) of the battlefield, most of which has been conveyed to the NPS and incorporated into the battlefield park.

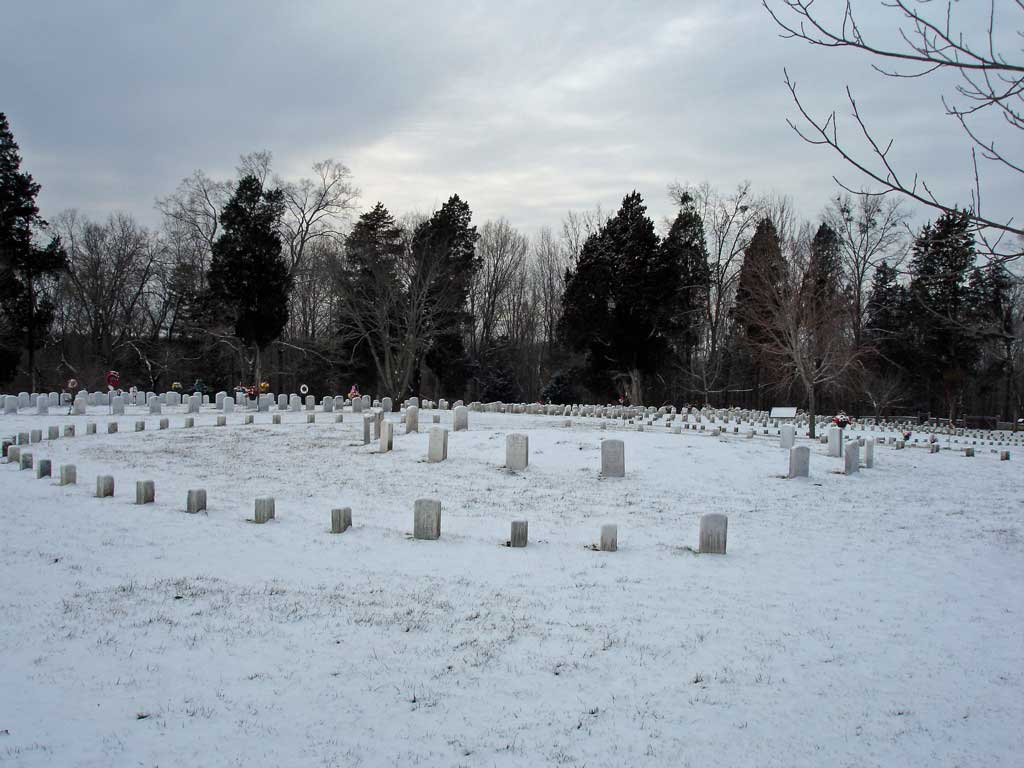
A portion of Fort Donelson National Cemetery

== Cemetery ==
The Fort Donelson National Cemetery, at 15.34 acres (62,080 m^{2}) in Stewart County, contains 670 Union dead, reinterred in 1867. There are numerous veterans from later wars. The cemetery is presently unavailable for additional burials.
