= Stewart County, Tennessee =

County in Tennessee, United States

- County
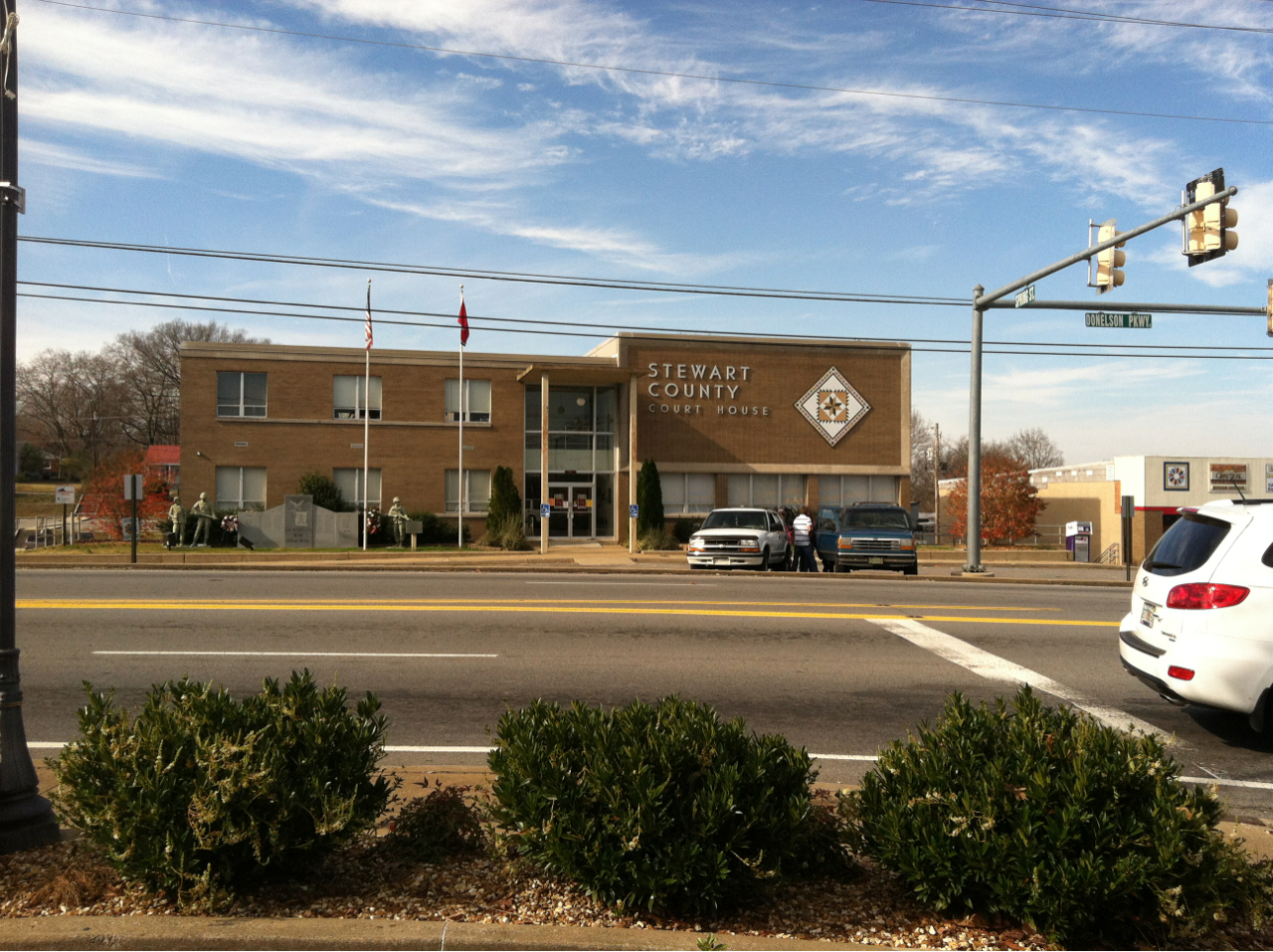
- Stewart County Courthouse in Dover

- Location within the U.S. state of Tennessee
- Coordinates: 36°30′N 87°50′W
- Country: United States
- State: Tennessee
- Founded: 1803
- Named for: Duncan Stewart
- Seat: Dover
- Largest city: Dover

Area
  - Total: 493 sq mi (1,280 km^{2})
  - Land: 459 sq mi (1,190 km^{2})
  - Water: 34 sq mi (88 km^{2}) 6.8%

Population (2020)
  - Total: 13,657
  - Estimate (2025): 14,439 ▲
  - Density: 29/sq mi (11/km^{2})
- Time zone: UTC−6 (Central)
  - Summer (DST): UTC−5 (CDT)
- Congressional district: 7th
- Website: www.stewartcogov.com

Stewart County is a county located on the northwestern corner of Middle Tennessee, in the U.S. state of Tennessee. As of the 2020 census, the population was 13,657. Its county seat is Dover. Stewart County is part of the Clarksville Metropolitan Statistical Area.

== History ==
Stewart County was created in 1803 from a portion of Montgomery County, and was named for Duncan Stewart, an early settler and state legislator. The first County Court met in March 1804. According to Goodspeed's history of Stewart County, "Stewart County was settled principally by North Carolinians, the first of whom came some time about 1795, that State having issued military grants to survivors of the Continental war, which called for large tracts of land lying in this county". It was settled during the early migration of pioneers from Virginia to the west after the American Revolutionary War. They pushed Native American peoples, such as the Cherokee, out of the area.

During the American Civil War, the Battle of Fort Donelson took place in February 1862. Union forces took control of the state, occupying several strategic areas. In August 1862 their forces partially burned the county seat, Dover, to prevent its re-capture by Confederate Lt. Col. Thomas G. Woodward. A second battle in the area, commonly called the Battle of Dover, took place in February 1863.

Tobaccoport Saltpeter Cave was intensely mined for saltpeter, possibly during the War of 1812 but more likely not until the Civil War. Saltpeter is the main ingredient of gunpowder and was obtained by leaching the earth from the cave. The Union took control of Tennessee and this area in February 1862, early in the Civil War. It seems unlikely that mining could have happened before that.

== Geography ==
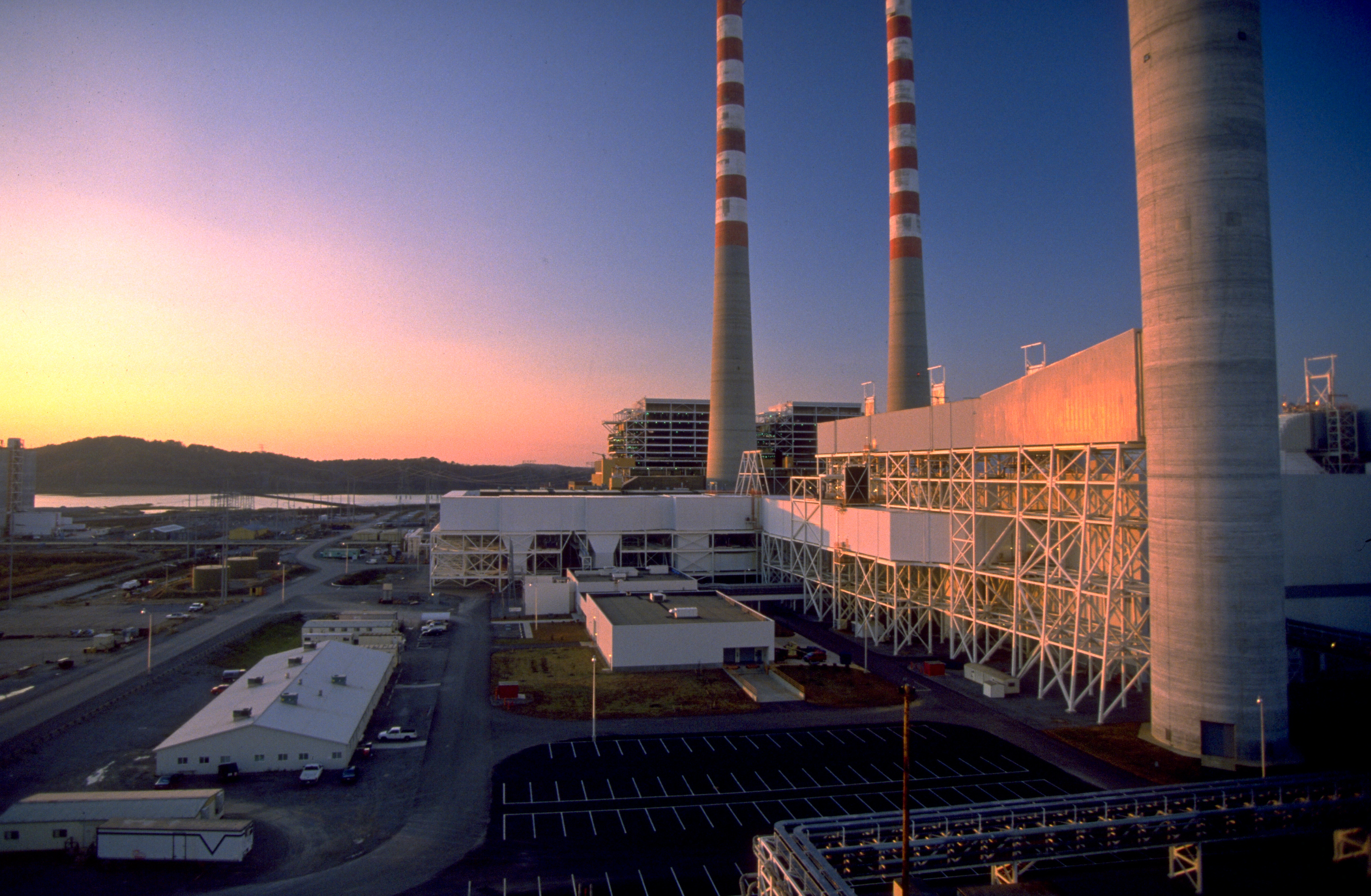
Cumberland Power Plant

According to the U.S. Census Bureau, the county has a total area of 493 square miles (1,280 km^{2}), of which 459 square miles (1,190 km^{2}) is land and 34 square miles (88 km^{2}) (6.8%) is water. The county lies in a rugged section of the northwestern Highland Rim. The Cumberland River (part of Lake Barkley) traverses the county. The Tennessee River (part of Kentucky Lake) provides the county's border with Henry County to the west.

Federal and state agencies control nearly 44% of the land in the county.

=== Adjacent counties ===
- Trigg County, Kentucky (north)
- Christian County, Kentucky (northeast)
- Montgomery County (east)
- Houston County (south)
- Benton County (southwest)
- Henry County (west)
- Calloway County, Kentucky (northwest)

=== National protected areas ===
- Cross Creeks National Wildlife Refuge
- Fort Donelson National Battlefield (part)
- Land Between the Lakes National Recreation Area (part)

=== State protected areas ===
- Barkley Wildlife Management Area
- Stewart State Forest

== Demographics ==
Historical population
Census	Pop.	Note	%±
1810	4,262		—
1820	8,397		97.0%
1830	6,968		−17.0%
1840	8,587		23.2%
1850	9,719		13.2%
1860	9,896		1.8%
1870	12,019		21.5%
1880	12,690		5.6%
1890	12,193		−3.9%
1900	15,224		24.9%
1910	14,860		−2.4%
1920	14,664		−1.3%
1930	13,278		−9.5%
1940	13,549		2.0%
1950	9,175		−32.3%
1960	7,851		−14.4%
1970	7,319		−6.8%
1980	8,665		18.4%
1990	9,479		9.4%
2000	12,370		30.5%
2010	13,324		7.7%
2020	13,657		2.5%
2025 (est.)	14,439	▲	5.7%
U.S. Decennial Census; 1790–1960 1900–1990; 1990–2000 2010–2014

=== Racial and ethnic composition ===
Stewart County, Tennessee – Racial and ethnic composition Note: the US Census treats Hispanic/Latino as an ethnic category. This table excludes Latinos from the racial categories and assigns them to a separate category. Hispanics/Latinos may be of any race.
Race / ethnicity (NH = Non-Hispanic)	Pop 1980	Pop 1990	Pop 2000	Pop 2010	Pop 2020	% 1980	% 1990	% 2000	% 2010	% 2020
White alone (NH)	8,442	9,252	11,701	12,469	12,321	97.43%	97.61%	94.59%	93.58%	90.22%
Black or African American alone (NH)	133	96	155	187	171	1.53%	1.01%	1.25%	1.40%	1.25%
Native American or Alaska Native alone (NH)	16	56	73	75	74	0.18%	0.59%	0.59%	0.56%	0.54%
Asian alone (NH)	13	25	180	135	76	0.15%	0.26%	1.46%	1.01%	0.56%
Native Hawaiian or Pacific Islander alone (NH)	x	x	6	3	2	x	x	0.05%	0.02%	0.01%
Other race alone (NH)	1	2	12	4	45	0.01%	0.02%	0.10%	0.03%	0.33%
Mixed race or Multiracial (NH)	x	x	119	201	632	x	x	0.96%	1.51%	4.63%
Hispanic or Latino (any race)	60	48	124	250	336	0.69%	0.51%	1.00%	1.88%	2.46%
Total	8,665	9,479	12,370	13,324	13,657	100.00%	100.00%	100.00%	100.00%	100.00%

=== 2020 census ===
As of the 2020 census, there were 13,657 people, 5,470 households, and 3,355 families residing in the county; the median age was 44.7 years, 21.2% of residents were under age 18, and 20.4% were 65 years of age or older. For every 100 females there were 98.8 males, and for every 100 females age 18 and over there were 98.3 males age 18 and over.

The racial and ethnic counts from the 2020 census are summarized in the table above.

<0.1% of residents lived in urban areas, while 100.0% lived in rural areas.

There were 5,470 households in the county, of which 28.2% had children under the age of 18 living in them. Of all households, 53.4% were married-couple households, 17.4% were households with a male householder and no spouse or partner present, and 23.2% were households with a female householder and no spouse or partner present. About 26.6% of all households were made up of individuals and 13.2% had someone living alone who was 65 years of age or older.

There were 6,669 housing units, of which 18.0% were vacant. Among occupied housing units, 76.1% were owner-occupied and 23.9% were renter-occupied. The homeowner vacancy rate was 1.4% and the rental vacancy rate was 9.5%.

=== 2000 census ===
As of the census of 2000, there were 12,370 people, 4,930 households, and 3,653 families residing in the county. The population density was 27 inhabitants per square mile (10/km^{2}). There were 5,977 housing units at an average density of 13 units per square mile (5.0/km^{2}). The racial makeup of the county was 95.27% White, 1.29% Black or African American, 0.61% Native American, 1.46% Asian, 0.05% Pacific Islander, 0.23% from other races, and 1.10% from two or more races. 1.00% of the population were Hispanic or Latino of any race.

There were 4,930 households, out of which 31.50% had children under the age of 18 living with them, 62.30% were married couples living together, 8.10% had a female householder with no husband present, and 25.90% were non-families. 23.10% of all households were made up of individuals, and 10.80% had someone living alone who was 65 years of age or older. The average household size was 2.49 and the average family size was 2.91.

In the county, the population was spread out, with 23.90% under the age of 18, 7.50% from 18 to 24, 28.40% from 25 to 44, 25.40% from 45 to 64, and 14.90% who were 65 years of age or older. The median age was 39 years. For every 100 females, there were 99.10 males. For every 100 females age 18 and over, there were 96.50 males.

The median income for a household in the county was $32,316, and the median income for a family was $38,655. Males had a median income of $31,106 versus $21,985 for females. The per capita income for the county was $16,302. About 10.60% of families and 12.40% of the population were below the poverty line, including 12.90% of those under age 18 and 15.60% of those age 65 or over.

== Politics ==
United States presidential election results for Stewart County, Tennessee
Year	Republican		Democratic		Third party(ies)	
Year	No.	%	No.	%	No.	%
1912	485	23.68%	1,312	64.06%	251	12.26%
1916	591	25.26%	1,711	73.12%	38	1.62%
1920	849	26.17%	2,366	72.93%	29	0.89%
1924	264	15.92%	1,369	82.57%	25	1.51%
1928	401	24.21%	1,255	75.79%	0	0.00%
1932	184	10.55%	1,548	88.76%	12	0.69%
1936	303	14.94%	1,718	84.71%	7	0.35%
1940	374	12.11%	2,699	87.40%	15	0.49%
1944	335	14.88%	1,916	85.12%	0	0.00%
1948	331	13.73%	1,962	81.38%	118	4.89%
1952	641	22.71%	2,170	76.87%	12	0.43%
1956	560	20.77%	2,120	78.64%	16	0.59%
1960	539	22.59%	1,810	75.86%	37	1.55%
1964	441	15.29%	2,444	84.71%	0	0.00%
1968	443	17.43%	1,041	40.97%	1,057	41.60%
1972	790	40.83%	1,098	56.74%	47	2.43%
1976	510	17.16%	2,442	82.17%	20	0.67%
1980	985	29.69%	2,274	68.54%	59	1.78%
1984	1,285	36.82%	2,174	62.29%	31	0.89%
1988	1,302	39.50%	1,979	60.04%	15	0.46%
1992	1,046	24.20%	2,779	64.28%	498	11.52%
1996	1,306	27.79%	2,962	63.02%	432	9.19%
2000	1,826	38.18%	2,870	60.02%	86	1.80%
2004	2,675	47.91%	2,860	51.23%	48	0.86%
2008	2,956	53.68%	2,470	44.85%	81	1.47%
2012	2,963	57.93%	2,069	40.45%	83	1.62%
2016	3,864	72.92%	1,222	23.06%	213	4.02%
2020	4,950	78.62%	1,232	19.57%	114	1.81%
2024	5,389	81.40%	1,160	17.52%	71	1.07%

The county is part of Tennessee's 7th congressional district. From the antebellum period, conservative whites historically voted Democratic, adding to the Southern Block. Residents of eastern Tennessee had been Unionist and supported the Republican Party.

In the late 20th century realignment of political parties, many white conservatives shifted into the Republican Party. Before Richard Nixon's campaign in 1972, no Republican had ever won as much as thirty percent of Stewart County's vote, but he won by a landslide in the South. Until 2004, Richard Nixon was the only GOP presidential candidate to gain forty percent of the vote in the country.

Before 2004, the Democratic presidential candidate lost Stewart County only in 1968, when segregationist George Wallace ran for the American Independent Party. After that Stewart County was one of only six Wallace counties (Note: The others were the fellow secessionist white-majority Middle Tennessee counties of Houston and Perry, plus the three Alabama Black Belt counties of Bullock, Lowndes and Wilcox. where Negro voter registration was severely delayed after the Voting Rights Act.) to support Democratic candidate George McGovern.

Since the turn of the 21st century, Stewart County's voters have increasingly supported Republican candidates in recent presidential elections. In the 2008 presidential election, John McCain received approximately 53.7% of the vote; he was the first Republican to carry the county. For 100 years before that, Stewart County was the sole county in Tennessee that had never voted in majority for a Republican presidential candidate. In 2016, Republican Donald Trump gained a proportion of votes here that was only marginally less than that of the GOP gained in the historically Unionist counties of East Tennessee and the Highland Rim; By 2024, he achieved 81% of the vote, while Kamala Harris achieved 19% of Stewart County’s vote.

== Media ==
=== Radio stations ===
- WTPR-FM 101.7 – "The Greatest Hits of All Time"
- WTPR-AM 710 – "The Greatest Hits of All Time"
- WRQR-FM 105.5 – "Today's Best Music with Ace & TJ in the Morning"

=== Newspaper ===
- The Stewart County Standard

== Communities ==
=== City ===
- Dover (county seat)

=== Towns ===
- Cumberland City
- Tennessee Ridge (mostly in Houston County)

=== Census-designated place ===
- Big Rock

=== Unincorporated communities ===
- Bear Spring
- Bumpus Mills
- Indian Mound
- Leatherwood

=== Ghost towns ===
- Model
- Tharpe

== See also ==
- National Register of Historic Places listings in Stewart County, Tennessee
