= Land Between the Lakes National Recreation Area =

Protected area in Kentucky and Tennessee, U.S.

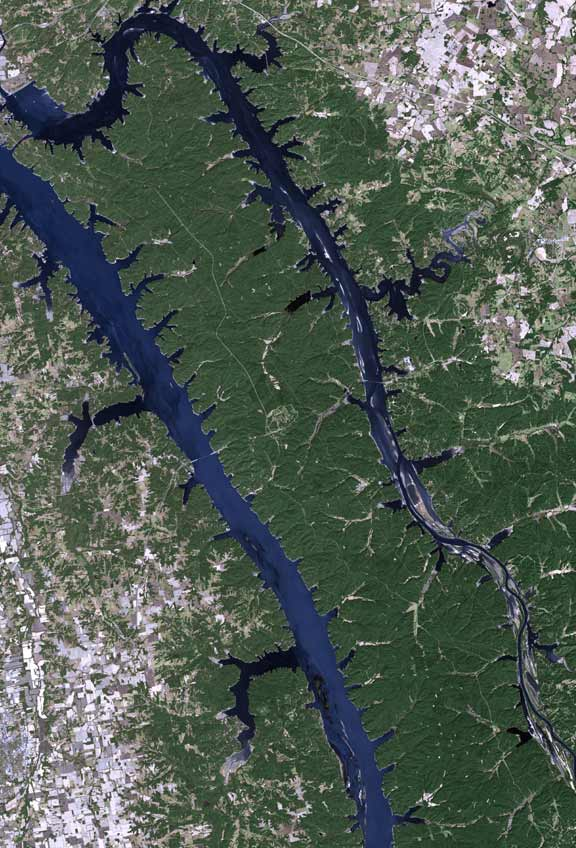
- Satellite photography

- Location within Kentucky Location within Tennessee Location within the United States
- Interactive map of Land Between the Lakes National Recreation Area
- Location: Lyon and Trigg counties in Kentucky and Stewart County in Tennessee, United States
- Nearest city: Murray, Kentucky
- Coordinates: 36°51′25″N 88°04′29″W
- Area: 171,280 acres (69,310 ha)
- Established: 1963
- Governing body: United States Forest Service
- Website: Land Between the Lakes National Recreation Area

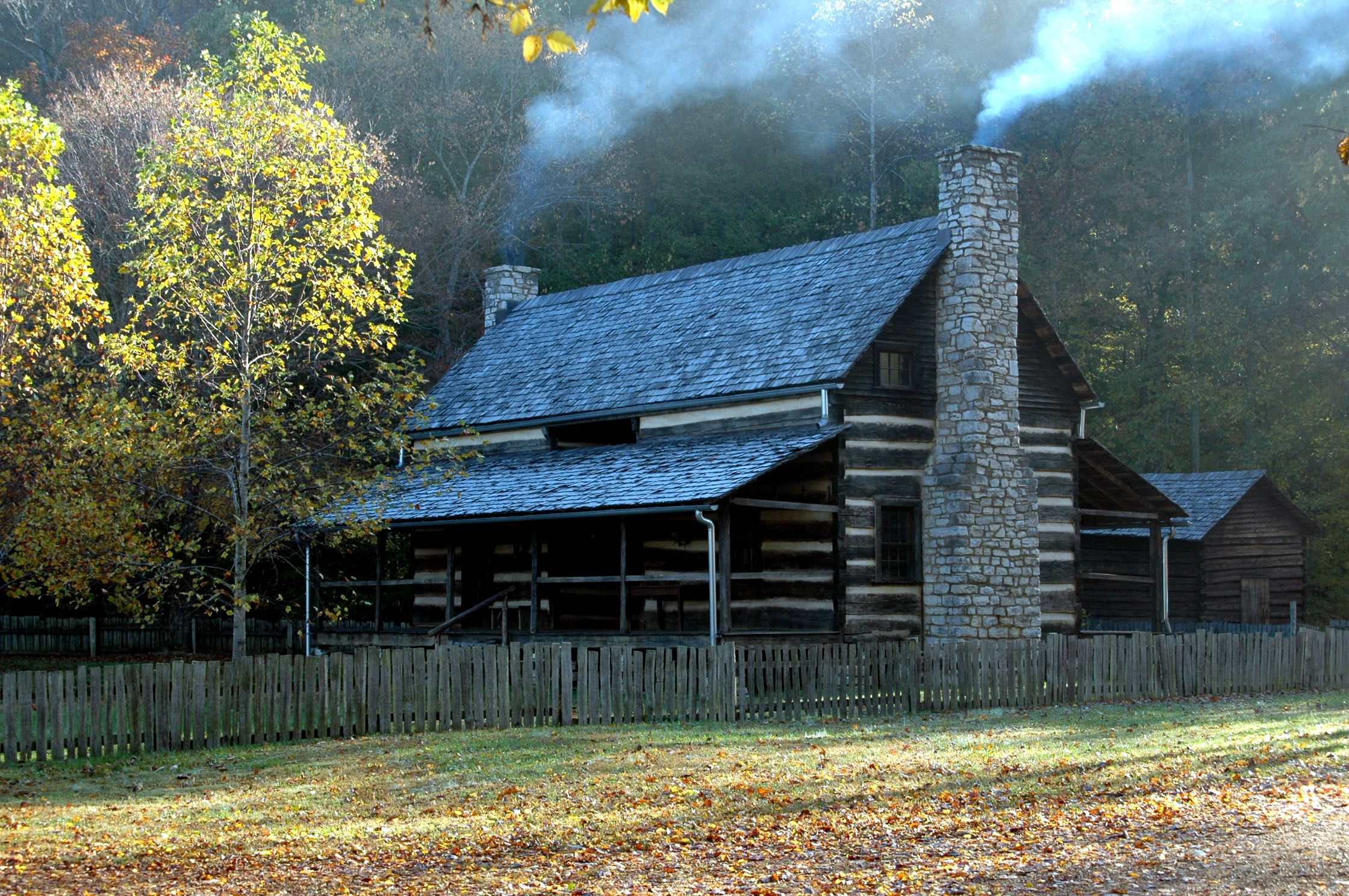
One of the structures of "The Homeplace"

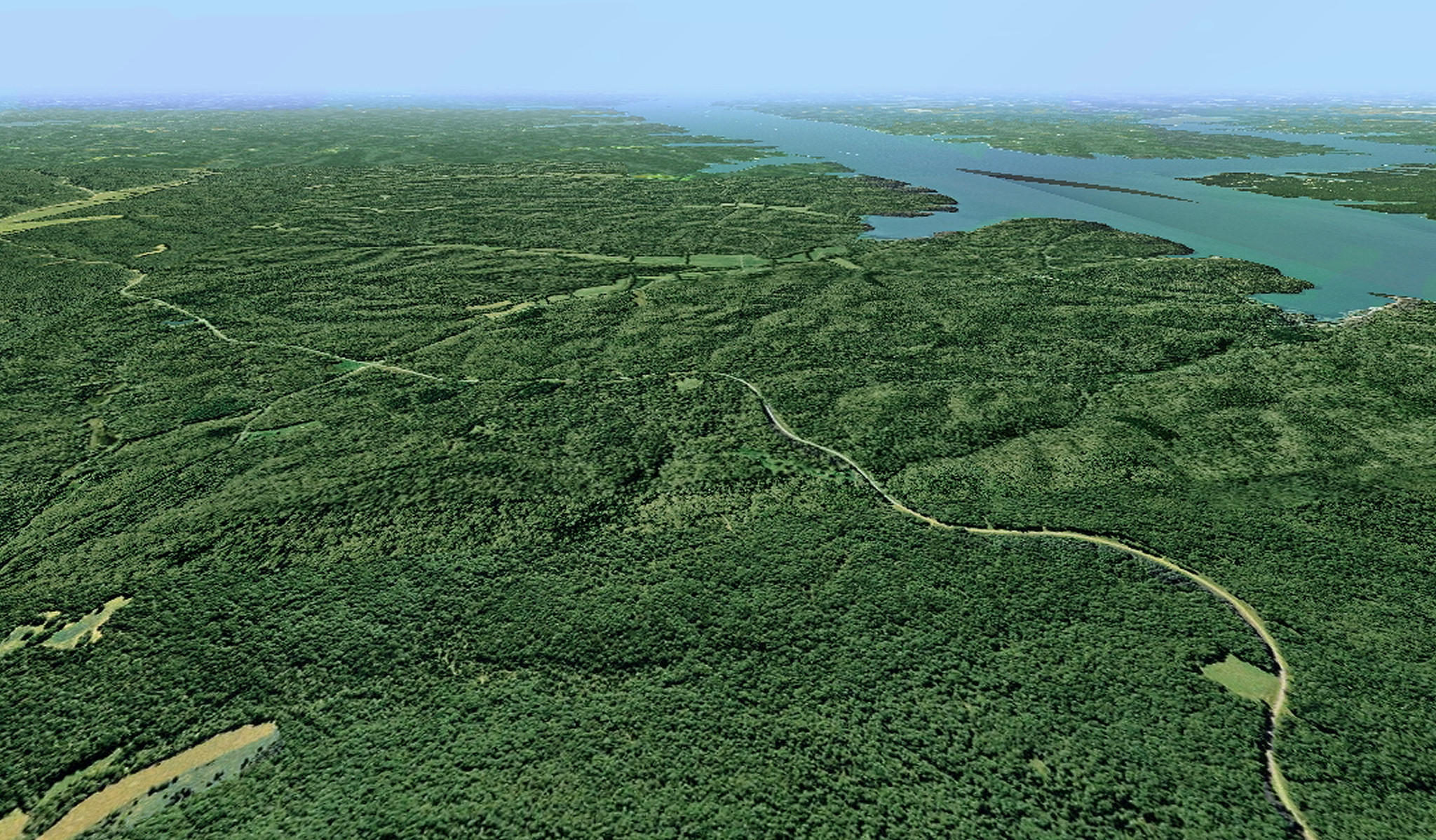
Aerial view of Trace parkway, weaving through Land Between The Lakes

Land Between the Lakes National Recreation Area (LBL) is a 171,280-acre (69,310 ha) national recreation area in Kentucky and Tennessee, United States, between Lake Barkley and Kentucky Lake. It was designated as a national recreation area in 1963 by President John F. Kennedy and developed using funds appropriated during the Johnson administration.

Originally managed by the Tennessee Valley Authority, which constructed dams to create the two lakes in this area, the recreation area was later transferred to the administration of the United States Forest Service. In 1991, it was designated a UNESCO Biosphere Reserve. President Donald Trump's administration withdrew it from the program as of June 2017. An estimated 2 million people visit the area each year.

== Geography ==
The Tennessee and Cumberland rivers flow very close to each other in the northwestern corner of Middle Tennessee and Western Kentucky, separated by a narrow and mostly low ridge. The area of land that separates the two bodies of water has been known as "Between the Rivers" since the 1830s or 1840s.

After the Cumberland River was impounded in the 1960s and a canal was constructed between the two manmade lakes, Land Between the Lakes became one of the largest inland peninsulas in the United States. Downstream from this area, the courses of the two rivers: the mouth of the Cumberland empties into the Ohio River approximately 4 mi (7 km) from that of the Tennessee.

== History ==
Communities which existed in the area include Tharpe and Model in Tennessee, and Golden Pond, Kentucky. During the American Civil War, the Confederate government built Fort Henry on the banks of the Tennessee River, in an effort to protect the upper reaches of that river from Union gunboats. Kentucky had declared its neutrality in the war. After Fort Henry fell to Union forces in early 1862, there was little more Civil War action in the area. Other areas were more strategically important, and the Union occupied much of Tennessee from 1862 to the end of the war.

=== Tennessee Valley Authority ===
During the Great Depression, President Franklin D. Roosevelt established the Tennessee Valley Authority as part of his New Deal. Specifically, the Authority was to construct a series of dams for both flood control and generation of electricity throughout the rural Tennessee Valley. The project would provide much needed jobs in the area, as well as provide electricity to a large area that lacked it. With the US entry into World War II, the project was also needed to satisfy electrical demand from the aluminum industry for the war effort. The site of the last dam downstream on the Tennessee River was to be Gilbertsville, Kentucky. The resulting impoundment, completed in the early 1940s, resulted in Kentucky Lake.

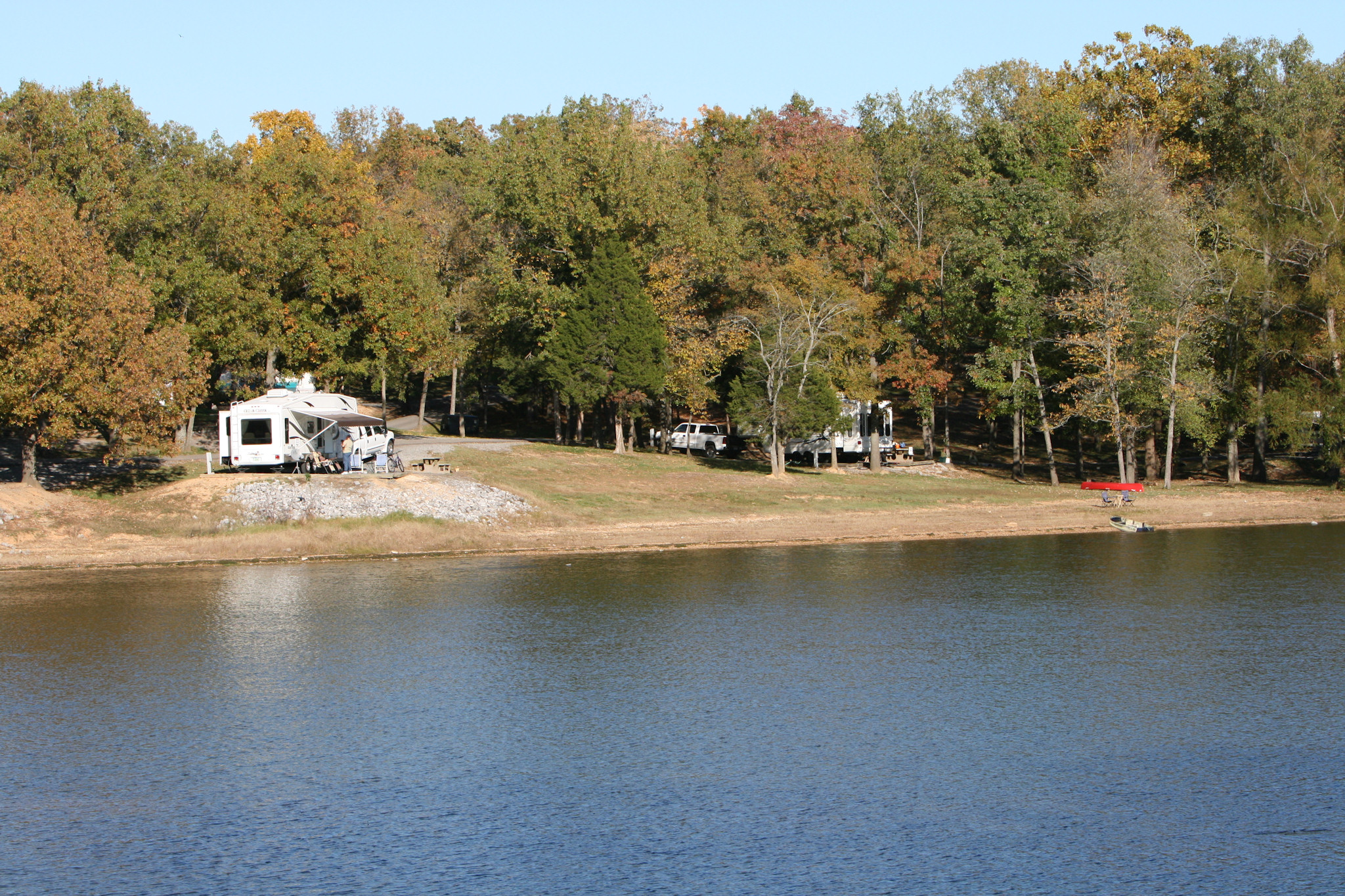
Dams raised the water levels, creating lakes where there were once rivers

Because the project would result in flooding of some of the low-lying land on the western side of the area, the TVA exercised eminent domain, condemning some of the properties and forcing the removal of approximately 800 families from their homes. As a result, entire towns, including Birmingham, Kentucky, were flooded and are now underwater.

Some residents were outraged about these actions, while others were happy to sell their land and start a new life in a less remote area.

The plan called for a new dam and the evacuation of residents from the entire former "Between the Rivers" area, not all of which was to be flooded. The area was to be developed as the Land Between the Lakes National Recreation Area, to produce a multiple-use approach to recreational lands.

The United States Army Corps of Engineers constructed a dam on the Cumberland, producing another lake. It was planned to be at the same elevation as Kentucky Lake, and the two rivers were to be connected by a canal that did not require locks. This project was intended to lessen the shipping distances for goods going from the Cumberland Valley to ports on the Gulf of Mexico, thus increasing their profitability.

The dam on the Cumberland, resulting in Lake Barkley, and a canal were completed in the 1960s. The lake was named after Alben W. Barkley, a Kentucky politician who had served as Vice President under President Harry S. Truman.

=== Creation of a National Recreation Area ===
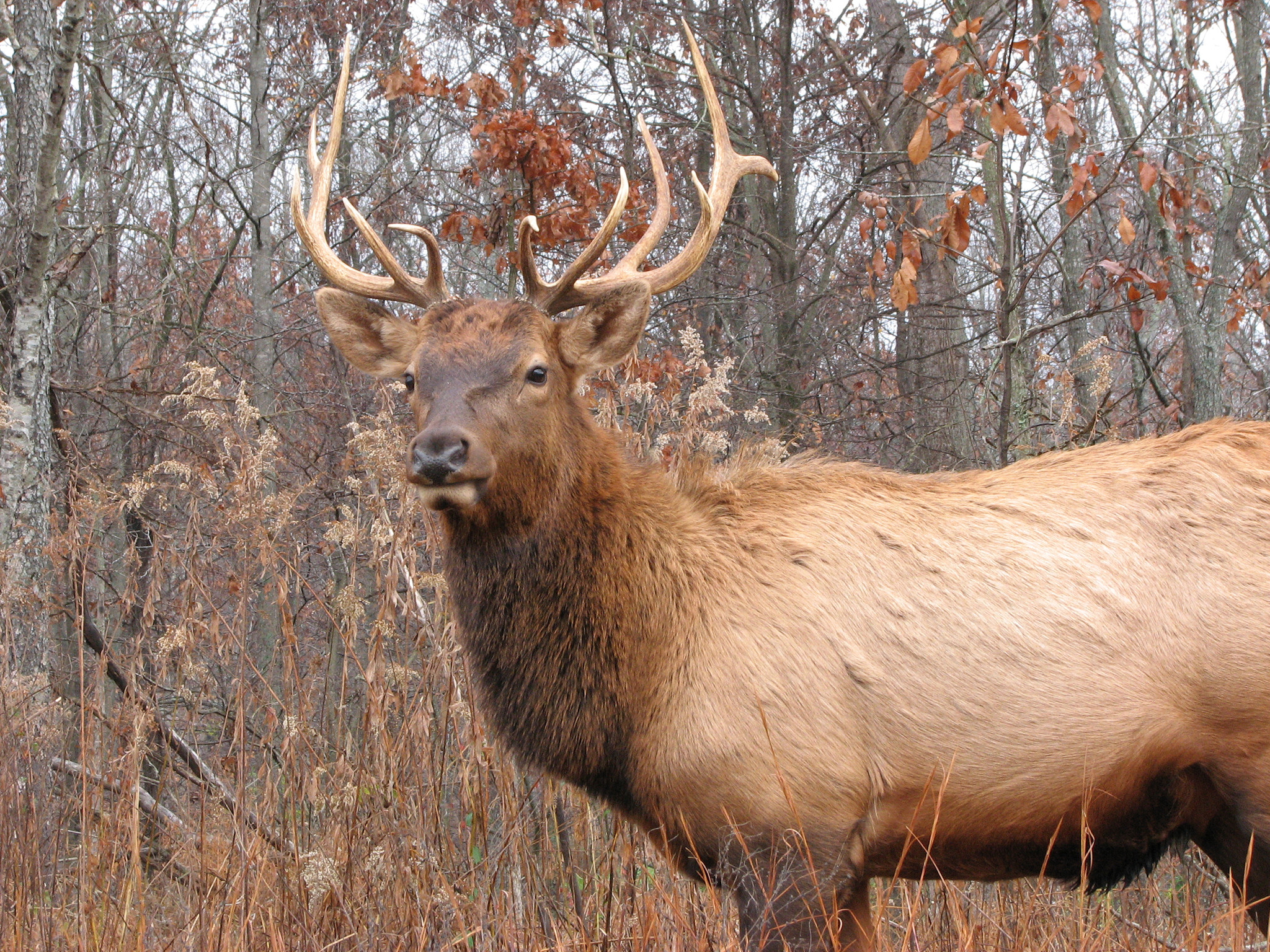
Elk and bison were historically indigenous to the area

Unlike a national park, there would be areas where hunting would be allowed. Plans for the recreation area included attractions such as a bison range, as this mammal had historically been present on the prairie in this area. In addition, a reconstructed 1850-style farm, called "The Homeplace", was to be operated as a living museum, with on-site staff in period costume simulating life on the farm and using period agricultural techniques. (Both of these attractions were added in the 1970s.)

The road through the Tennessee portion was renamed from State Route 49 to "The Trace." This was short for "Buffalo Trace," as both Native Americans and later European-American settlers followed paths, and later roads, developed from the seasonal migration paths of bison).

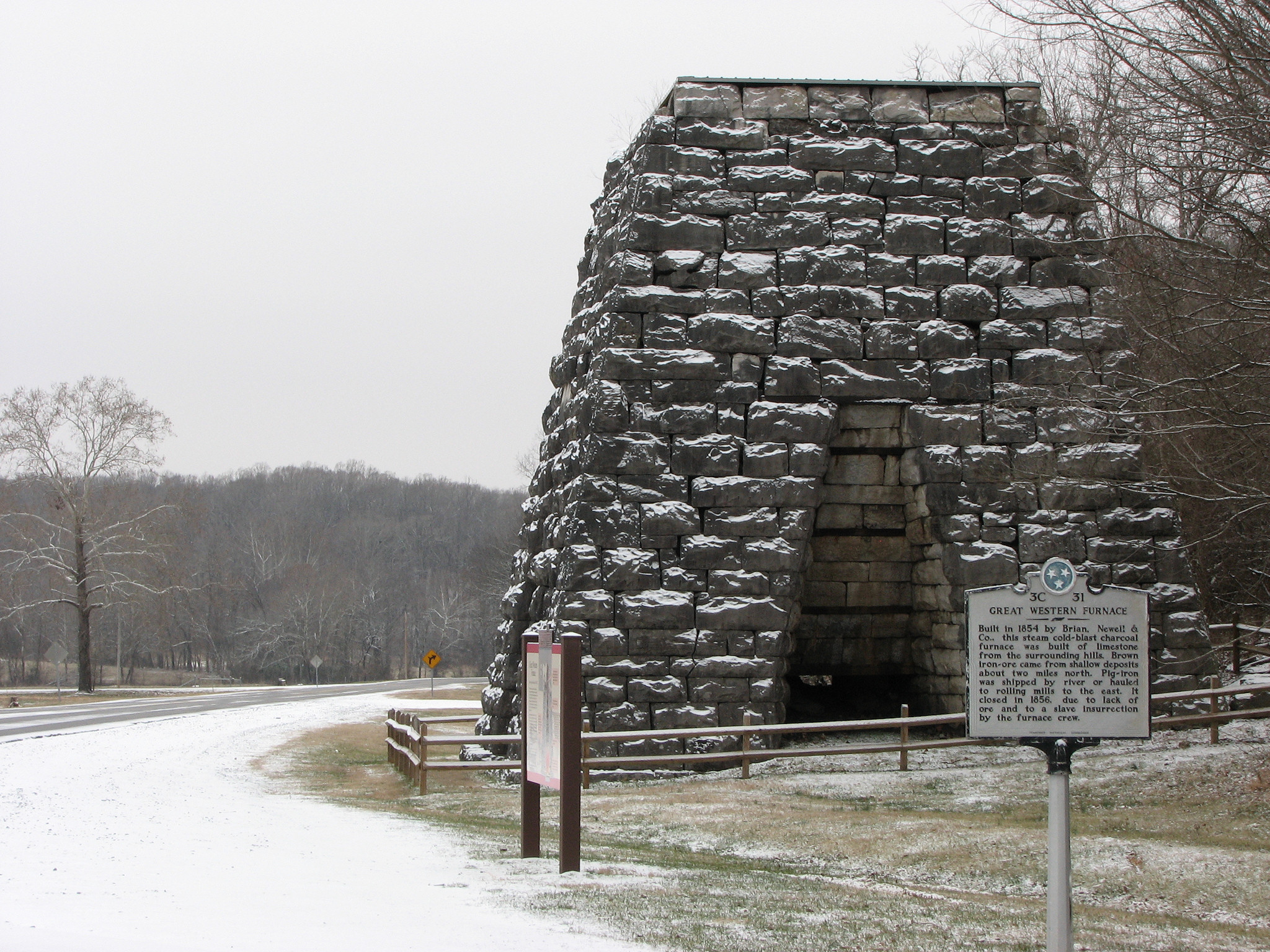
Great Western Iron Furnace

This project required the abandonment of the communities of Tharpe and Model in Tennessee, and Golden Pond, Kentucky. The remains of a former iron furnace, manned in the 1850s by enslaved African-American workers, is about all that remains of Model. The former site of Golden Pond is now occupied by the headquarters of the recreation area and retains the postal address for it. Also at this site is a museum, a planetarium, and an environmental education area.

The recreation area has many miles of hiking trails, numerous boat ramps, an off-road vehicle area, and numerous campgrounds, plus group lodges and a few cabins. Most of the attractions require a user fee.

Beginning in the 1970s, the 700-acre (280 ha) Elk and Bison Prairie enclosure was developed. In preparation, the TVA conducted prescribed burns to encourage the expansion of the remnant patches of native prairie, which had been crowded out by the growth of oak and hickory forests over the previous 150 years, when grazing animals were not held here. After the area was regularly burned and reseeded with grasses, elk (from Elk Island National Park in Alberta, Canada) and American bison were brought to the prairie. Their grazing helps limit the growth of trees.

In 1996 the Elk & Bison Prairie was officially inaugurated. It is open to driving tours and visitors can see the large mammals that occupied a typical 18th-century landscape for this area.

In the 1990s, the directors of the TVA decided to withdraw from activities requiring direct taxpayer funding. In 1998, the US Congress authorized transfer of operation of the area to the U.S. Forest Service of the United States Department of Agriculture.

=== 2021 Tornadoes ===
Two tornadoes hit the Land Between the Lakes area on December 10, 2021, one at the north end near Hillman Ferry Campground in Kentucky and another at the south end near Boswell Landing. While no buildings were destroyed, the tornadoes damaged the landscape of Land Between the Lakes, and portions of the North/South Trail and the Fort Henry Trail system remain closed as of early 2025.

== Recreational Activities ==
Land Between the Lakes offers a range of outdoor activities, including hiking, mountain biking, boating, fishing, camping, and hunting. There are also opportunities for nature education and birdwatching.

=== Hiking/Biking ===
The Land Between the Lakes site maintains a list of trail maps accessible to visitors. Popular trails include

- Central Hardwoods Scenic Trail, an 11-mile pea-gravel path running east–west through the Land Between the Lakes
- Canal Loop Trail, an 11-mile loop near the north visitors' station.
- Hematite Lake Trail, a looped dirt path 2 miles in length.
- Honker Lake Trail, a looped dirt path 4 miles in length.
- North/South Trail, a 59-mile trail running north–south through the Land Between the Lakes.

Central Hardwoods and Canal Loop are both popular with mountain bikers as well.

=== Boating/Fishing ===
Common species of fish in Land Between the Lakes include bass, crappie, sauger, catfish, sunfish and bluegill. Fishers are required to have a Kentucky fishing license.

Boat ramps may be found at campgrounds such as Demumbers Bay, Ginger Bay, Neville Bay, Pisgah Point, and Twin Lakes.
