= Dover, Tennessee =

- City
- Location of Dover in Stewart County, Tennessee.
- Coordinates: 36°28′56″N 87°50′41″W
- Country: United States
- State: Tennessee
- County: Stewart

Government
  - Mayor: Lesa Fitzhugh

Area
  - Total: 3.96 sq mi (10.25 km^{2})
  - Land: 3.85 sq mi (9.98 km^{2})
  - Water: 0.10 sq mi (0.27 km^{2})
- Elevation: 413 ft (126 m)

Population (2020)
  - Total: 1,826
  - Density: 473.7/sq mi (182.91/km^{2})
- Time zone: UTC-6 (Central (CST))
  - Summer (DST): UTC-5 (CDT)
- ZIP code: 37058
- Area code: 931
- FIPS code: 47-21400
- GNIS feature ID: 1282753
- Website: www.dovertn.com

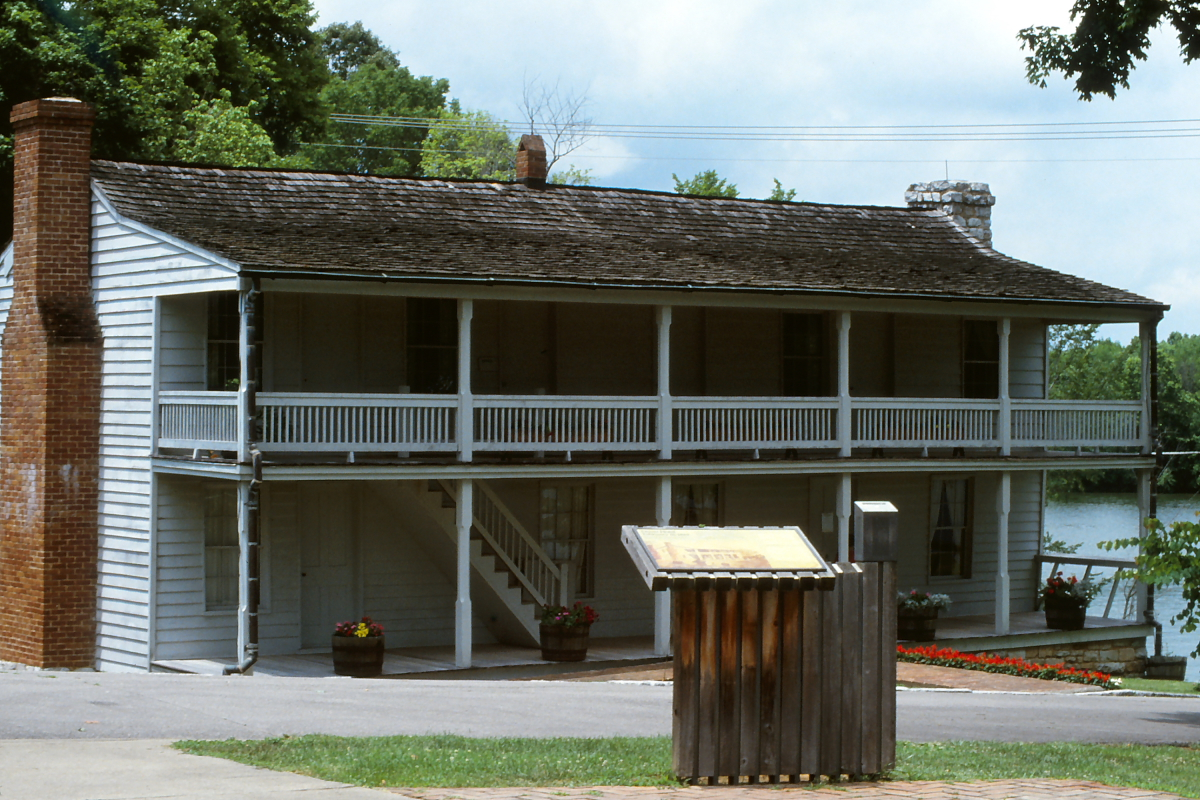
The Dover Hotel was the site of the unconditional surrender of General Buckner to General Grant in 1862

Dover is a city in and the county seat of Stewart County, Tennessee, 67 miles (108 km) west-northwest of Nashville on the Cumberland River. Fort Donelson National Cemetery is in Dover. As of the 2020 census, Dover had a population of 1,826.

Dover is part of the Clarksville metropolitan area.

== Geography ==
Dover is located at 36°28′56″N 87°50′41″W (36.482316, -87.844678).

According to the United States Census Bureau, the city has a total area of 3.9 square miles (10 km^{2}), of which 3.8 square miles (9.8 km^{2}) is land and 0.1 square miles (0.26 km^{2}) (2.56%) is water.

=== Climate ===
Climate data for Dover 1 W, Tennessee (1991–2020 normals, extremes 1897–present)
Month	Jan	Feb	Mar	Apr	May	Jun	Jul	Aug	Sep	Oct	Nov	Dec	Year
Record high °F (°C)	79 (26)	84 (29)	93 (34)	97 (36)	100 (38)	114 (46)	110 (43)	107 (42)	106 (41)	96 (36)	88 (31)	79 (26)	114 (46)
Mean maximum °F (°C)	67.3 (19.6)	71.1 (21.7)	78.6 (25.9)	84.6 (29.2)	87.1 (30.6)	92.1 (33.4)	95.1 (35.1)	94.9 (34.9)	91.2 (32.9)	84.5 (29.2)	76.4 (24.7)	68.1 (20.1)	96.9 (36.1)
Mean daily maximum °F (°C)	46.0 (7.8)	50.8 (10.4)	60.4 (15.8)	70.3 (21.3)	77.4 (25.2)	84.4 (29.1)	87.8 (31.0)	87.7 (30.9)	81.9 (27.7)	70.8 (21.6)	59.6 (15.3)	49.7 (9.8)	68.9 (20.5)
Daily mean °F (°C)	36.7 (2.6)	40.6 (4.8)	49.4 (9.7)	58.7 (14.8)	67.2 (19.6)	74.9 (23.8)	78.4 (25.8)	77.7 (25.4)	70.9 (21.6)	59.2 (15.1)	48.9 (9.4)	40.4 (4.7)	58.6 (14.8)
Mean daily minimum °F (°C)	27.4 (−2.6)	30.4 (−0.9)	38.4 (3.6)	47.1 (8.4)	56.9 (13.8)	65.5 (18.6)	69.0 (20.6)	67.7 (19.8)	59.9 (15.5)	47.7 (8.7)	38.1 (3.4)	31.2 (−0.4)	48.3 (9.1)
Mean minimum °F (°C)	9.2 (−12.7)	13.2 (−10.4)	21.5 (−5.8)	31.1 (−0.5)	42.0 (5.6)	53.8 (12.1)	59.8 (15.4)	57.3 (14.1)	45.3 (7.4)	32.0 (0.0)	22.7 (−5.2)	14.6 (−9.7)	6.5 (−14.2)
Record low °F (°C)	−24 (−31)	−21 (−29)	−3 (−19)	21 (−6)	30 (−1)	38 (3)	44 (7)	44 (7)	24 (−4)	19 (−7)	−7 (−22)	−18 (−28)	−24 (−31)
Average precipitation inches (mm)	4.19 (106)	4.82 (122)	5.24 (133)	5.66 (144)	6.03 (153)	4.53 (115)	4.32 (110)	3.77 (96)	3.56 (90)	3.82 (97)	4.26 (108)	4.60 (117)	54.80 (1,392)
Average snowfall inches (cm)	1.3 (3.3)	1.3 (3.3)	0.4 (1.0)	0.0 (0.0)	0.0 (0.0)	0.0 (0.0)	0.0 (0.0)	0.0 (0.0)	0.0 (0.0)	0.0 (0.0)	0.1 (0.25)	0.7 (1.8)	3.8 (9.7)
Average precipitation days (≥ 0.01 in)	8.8	8.4	9.5	9.8	10.0	8.1	7.7	6.8	7.0	7.3	8.1	8.7	100.2
Average snowy days (≥ 0.1 in)	1.0	0.9	0.2	0.0	0.0	0.0	0.0	0.0	0.0	0.0	0.0	0.2	2.3
Source: NOAA

== Demographics ==
Historical population
Census	Pop.	Note	%±
1860	298		—
1870	270		−9.4%
1880	317		17.4%
1900	400		—
1960	736		—
1970	1,179		60.2%
1980	1,197		1.5%
1990	1,341		12.0%
2000	1,442		7.5%
2010	1,417		−1.7%
2020	1,826		28.9%

=== 2020 census ===
As of the 2020 census, Dover had a population of 1,826, with 667 households and 381 families residing in the city. The median age was 42.9 years; 18.9% of residents were under the age of 18 and 21.8% of residents were 65 years of age or older. For every 100 females there were 99.1 males, and for every 100 females age 18 and over there were 99.9 males age 18 and over.

There were 746 housing units, of which 10.6% were vacant. The homeowner vacancy rate was 2.6% and the rental vacancy rate was 8.1%.

0.0% of residents lived in urban areas, while 100.0% lived in rural areas.

Racial composition as of the 2020 census
Race	Number	Percent
White	1,667	91.3%
Black or African American	57	3.1%
American Indian and Alaska Native	4	0.2%
Asian	9	0.5%
Native Hawaiian and Other Pacific Islander	0	0.0%
Some other race	29	1.6%
Two or more races	60	3.3%
Hispanic or Latino (of any race)	57	3.1%

=== 2000 census ===
As of the census of 2000, there was a population of 1,442, with 608 households and 373 families residing in the city. The population density was 379.9 inhabitants per square mile (146.7/km^{2}). There were 656 housing units at an average density of 172.8 per square mile (66.7/km^{2}). The racial makeup of the city was 94.73% White, 3.05% African American, 0.69% Native American, 0.07% Asian, 0.55% from other races, and 0.90% from two or more races. Hispanic or Latino of any race were 0.83% of the population.

There were 608 households, out of which 23.0% had children under the age of 18 living with them, 49.3% were married couples living together, 7.2% had a female householder with no husband present, and 38.5% were non-families. 36.3% of all households were made up of individuals, and 21.7% had someone living alone who was 65 years of age or older. The average household size was 2.21 and the average family size was 2.88.

In the city, the population distribution was: 19.4% under the age of 18, 5.1% from 18 to 24, 24.2% from 25 to 44, 24.1% from 45 to 64, and 27.3% who were 65 years of age or older. The median age was 46 years. For every 100 females, there were 83.7 males. For every 100 females age 18 and over, there were 80.2 males.

The median income for a household in the city was $33,839, and the median income for a family was $42,266. Males had a median income of $27,227 versus $21,563 for females. The per capita income for the city was $18,483. About 8.1% of families and 11.1% of the population were below the poverty line, including 9.5% of those under age 18 and 16.7% of those age 65 or over.

== Tourism ==
Fort Donelson, the site of a major Union victory in the Civil War, is located west of downtown Dover and located inside Fort Donelson National Battlefield Park.

Cross Creeks National Wildlife Refuge, a 8,862 acres (35.86 km^{2}) habitat for waterfowl and aquatic plant life, is located on the Cumberland River east of Dover.

Land Between the Lakes National Recreation Area is located 6 miles (9.7 km) from downtown.

American singer-songwriter Dolly Parton was inspired to write the song "Down from Dover" when riding through the town on a tour bus.

== Media ==
Radio stations:

- WTPR-FM 101.7 - "The Greatest Hits of All Time"
- WTPR-AM 710 - "The Greatest Hits of All Time"
- WRQR-FM 105.5 - "Today's Best Music with Ace & TJ in the Morning"

== Notable people ==
- Isham N. Haynie, lawyer, politician, soldier and officer in the Union Army.
- William B. Ross, 12th Governor of Wyoming.
- Bernie Walter, professional baseball player.
