= Grand Rivers, Kentucky =

- City
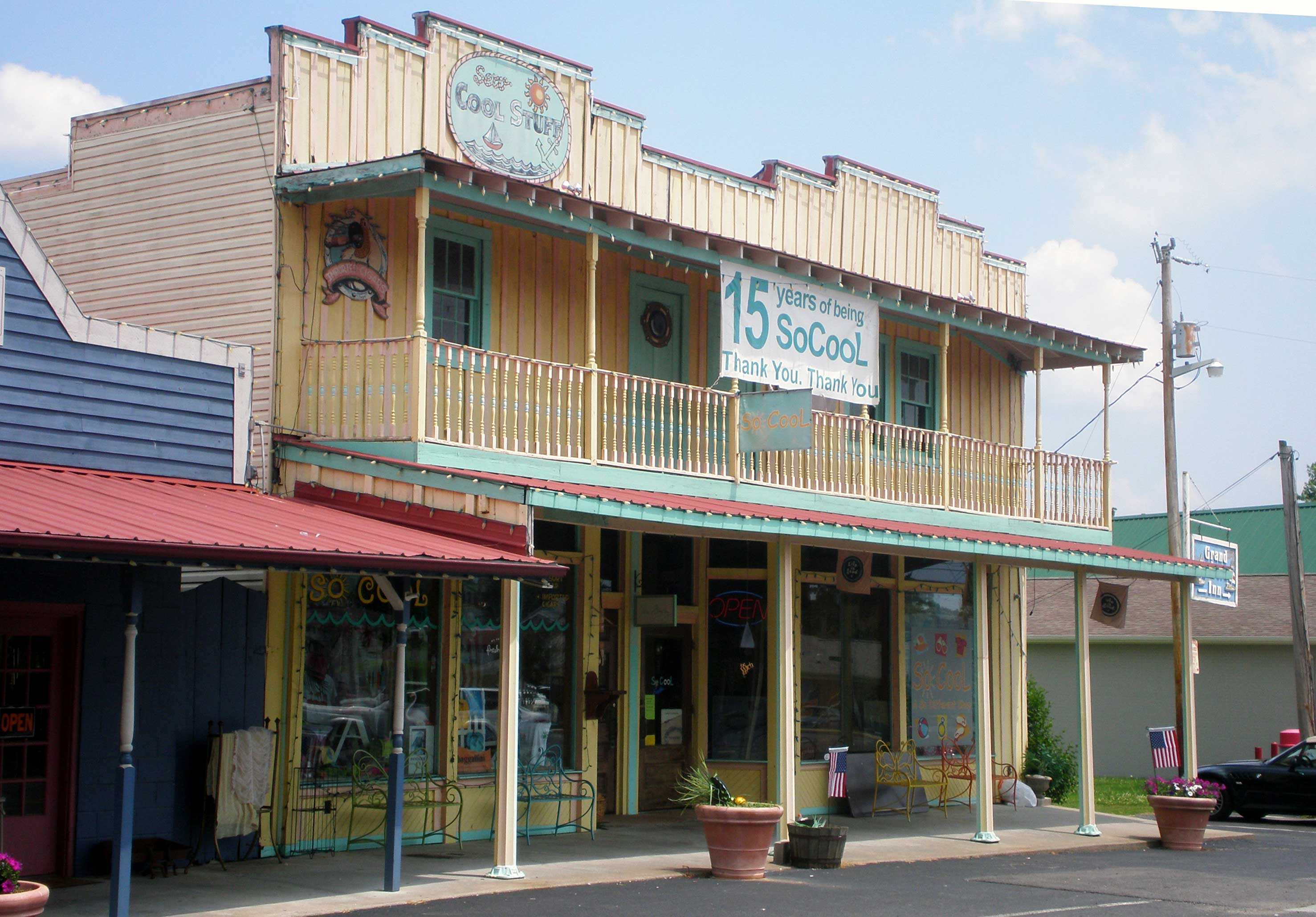
- Downtown Grand Rivers, Kentucky

- Location of Grand Rivers in Livingston County, Kentucky.
- Coordinates: 37°00′18″N 88°13′58″W
- Country: United States
- State: Kentucky
- County: Livingston
- Named for: the nearby Cumberland, Tennessee, and Ohio rivers

Area
  - Total: 1.97 sq mi (5.10 km^{2})
  - Land: 1.85 sq mi (4.80 km^{2})
  - Water: 0.12 sq mi (0.30 km^{2})
- Elevation: 423 ft (129 m)

Population (2020)
  - Total: 345
  - Density: 186/sq mi (71.9/km^{2})
- Time zone: UTC-6 (Central (CST))
  - Summer (DST): UTC-5 (CDT)
- ZIP code: 42045
- Area codes: 270 & 364
- FIPS code: 21-32212
- GNIS feature ID: 2403725
- Website: www.grandrivers.org

Grand Rivers is a home rule-class city in Livingston County, Kentucky, in the United States. As of the 2020 census, Grand Rivers had a population of 345. It is part of the Paducah, KY-IL Metropolitan Statistical Area.

== Geography ==
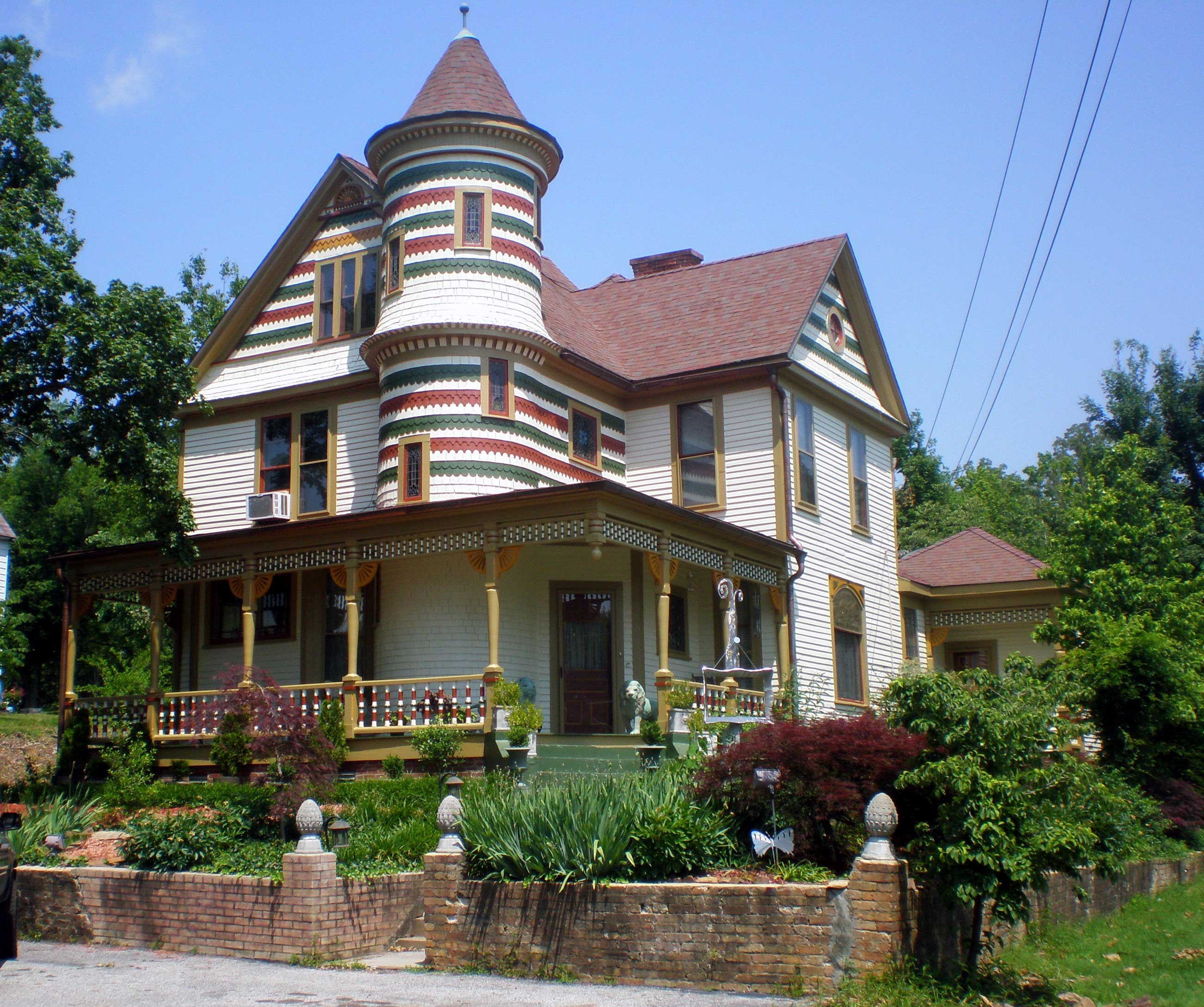
Boston financier Thomas Lawson's residence in Grand Rivers, when he was promoting the town as the next great steel-making center, to rival Pittsburgh and Birmingham.

According to the United States Census Bureau, the city has a total area of 1.9 square miles (4.9 km^{2}), of which 1.8 square miles (4.8 km^{2}) is land and 0.04 square miles (0.10 km^{2}) (2.13%) is water.

The town was formerly located at the narrowest point between the Cumberland River and the Tennessee. Both were dammed and artificial lakes created by the Tennessee Valley Authority and the Army Corps of Engineers in the early 20th century; the town now lies on an isthmus of land between Kentucky Lake and Lake Barkley.

== History ==
Grand Rivers may have originally been known as Narrows from its position between the Cumberland and Tennessee Rivers. The local post office was established in 1879 as Otisville; changed its name in 1882 to Bernard; and was then changed again to Nickells the next year after the name of a new Illinois Central station.

The settlement was formally incorporated by the state assembly in 1890 as Grand Rivers. This newly expanded community was part of local businessman Thomas W. Lawson's attempt to develop local iron deposits into a major steel industry. (The enterprise failed within a few years.) The name refers the Cumberland and Tennessee rivers which previously met near the site, prior to the TVA's creation of Kentucky Lake and Lake Barkley. The Tennessee's confluence with the Ohio is located within 40 miles of the town as well.

== Demographics ==
Historical population
Census	Pop.	Note	%±
1920	478		—
1930	452		−5.4%
1940	499		10.4%
1950	234		−53.1%
1960	378		61.5%
1970	438		15.9%
1980	428		−2.3%
1990	351		−18.0%
2000	343		−2.3%
2010	382		11.4%
2020	345		−9.7%
U.S. Decennial Census

As of the census of 2000, there were 343 people, 165 households, and 103 families residing in the city. The population density was 186.1 inhabitants per square mile (71.9/km^{2}). There were 201 housing units at an average density of 109.1 per square mile (42.1/km^{2}). The racial makeup of the city was 97.08% White, 0.29% Native American, 0.29% Pacific Islander, 1.17% from other races, and 1.17% from two or more races. Hispanic or Latino of any race were 1.17% of the population.

There were 165 households, out of which 17.6% had children under the age of 18 living with them, 53.3% were married couples living together, 4.8% had a female householder with no husband present, and 37.0% were non-families. 33.9% of all households were made up of individuals, and 17.6% had someone living alone who was 65 years of age or older. The average household size was 2.07 and the average family size was 2.63.

In the city, the population was spread out, with 16.6% under the age of 18, 5.2% from 18 to 24, 21.3% from 25 to 44, 35.9% from 45 to 64, and 21.0% who were 65 years of age or older. The median age was 50 years. For every 100 females, there were 101.8 males. For every 100 females age 18 and over, there were 98.6 males.

The median income for a household in the city was $33,250, and the median income for a family was $42,917. Males had a median income of $28,750 versus $15,521 for females. The per capita income for the city was $21,642. About 8.7% of families and 10.1% of the population were below the poverty line, including 14.3% of those under age 18 and 9.0% of those age 65 or over.
