= Tennessee State Route 48 =

State highway in Tennessee, United States

State Route 48
- SR 48; primary in red, secondary in blue

Route information
- Maintained by TDOT
- Length: 103.86 mi (167.15 km)
- Existed: October 1, 1923–present

Major junctions
- South end: SR 13 in rural northern Wayne County
- US 412 / SR 20 / SR 99 in Holenwald; I-40 in southern Dickson County; US 70 in Dickson; US 41A Byp. in Clarksville; US 41A / US 79 in Clarksville; I-24 north of Clarksville
- North end: KY 104 at the Tennessee-Kentucky State Line north of Clarksville

Location
- Country: United States
- State: Tennessee
- Counties: Wayne, Perry, Lewis, Hickman, Dickson, Montgomery

Highway system
- Tennessee State Routes; Interstate; US; State
← SR 47	→ SR 49

State Route 48 (SR 48) is a long north–south state highway in Middle Tennessee. It traverses six counties, and it is 103.86 miles (167.15 km) long.

== Route description ==
=== Wayne, Perry, and Lewis Counties ===
SR 48 begins as a primary state route in far northern Wayne County at a junction with SR 13. Then it travels through the southeastern corner of Perry County before entering Lewis County to intersect SR 20, and then U.S. Route 412 (US 412) and SR 99 in Hohenwald. After Hohenwald, SR 48 then goes due north to Hickman County.

=== Hickman County ===
SR 48 then runs concurrently with SR 100 near the Beaver Dam Creek Wildlife Management Area. It follows SR 100 to Centerville, where it intersects SR 50 and bridges the Duck River.

SR 48 becomes a secondary route after separating from SR 100 and intersects SR 230 at Nunnelly. It then traverses Pinewood, and then intersects the exit 163 interchange with Interstate 40 (I-40) not long after crossing into Dickson County.

=== Dickson County ===
It then enters the city of Dickson and intersects US 70 Business in downtown Dickson. SR 48 goes back to being a primary route and intersects with US 70/SR 1).

After exiting Dickson, SR 48 (as a primary highway) goes to intersect SR 49 in Charlotte, the Dickson County seat. SR 49 goes further north through Cumberland Furnace and then enters Montgomery County.

=== Montgomery County ===
It then enters Cunningham. When it reaches Cunningham, it runs concurrently with SR 13 from there to downtown Clarksville, where it intersects with SR 149 before crossing the Cumberland River to intersect US 41A Bypass/SR 12, and then US 41A/SR 12. After this point, SR 48 turns into a secondary state route for the remainder of its length. SR 48 runs concurrently with SR 13 again, but this time SR 13 is unsigned and US 79 is the main designation.

SR 48 splits from US 79 (Wilma Rudolph Boulevard) and then continues as Trenton Road. SR 48 (Trenton Road) then has an intersection with SR 374 (101st Airborne Parkway). SR 48 has two more intersections, one with SR 236, and then the exit 1 interchange on I-24 on the north side of Clarksville. Its northern terminus is at the Kentucky state line where the road enters Todd County, Kentucky and becomes Kentucky Route 104.

== Major intersections ==
County	Location	mi	km	Destinations	Notes
Wayne		0.0	0.0	SR 13 (Waynesboro Highway) – Waynesboro, Linden	Southern terminus; SR 48 begins as a primary route
Perry	No major junctions				
Lewis	Hohenwald			SR 20 east / SR 99 west (E 4th Avenue) to Natchez Trace Parkway – Summertown, Waynesboro	Southern end of SR 20/SR 99 concurrency
Lewis	Hohenwald			US 412 (Main Street/SR 20 west/SR 99 east) to Natchez Trace Parkway – Linden, Hampshire, Columbia	Northern end of SR 20/SR 99 concurrency
Hickman				SR 100 west – Linden	Southern end of SR 100 concurrency
Hickman	Centerville			SR 50 east – Columbia	Southern end of SR 50 concurrency
Hickman	Centerville			SR 50 west to I-40 – Lobelville	Northern end of SR 50 concurrency
Hickman	Centerville			Bridge over Duck River	
Hickman	Centerville			SR 100 east / SR 230 east – Lyles, Littlelot	Northern end of SR 100 concurrency; southern end of SR 230 concurrency; SR 48 becomes a secondary route
Hickman	Nunnelly			SR 230 west to I-40 – Waverly	Northern end of SR 230 concurrency
Dickson				I-40 – Memphis, Nashville	I-40 exit 163
Dickson				Bridge over West Piney River	
Dickson				Bridge over East Piney River	
Dickson	Dickson			SR 47 north (E Walnut Street) – Burns	Southern terminus of SR 47
Dickson	Dickson			US 70 Bus. (College Street/SR 235)	
Dickson	Dickson			US 70 / SR 46 (Henslee Drive/SR 1) – McEwen, White Bluff	Interchange; SR 48 becomes a primary route
Dickson	Charlotte			SR 47 south (Charles Walton Speight Highway) – White Bluff	Northern terminus of SR 47
Dickson	Charlotte			SR 49 east (Spring Street) – Ashland City	Southern end of SR 49 concurrency
Dickson	Charlotte			SR 49 west (Van Leer Highway) – Vanleer	northern end of SR 49 concurrency
Montgomery	Cunningham			SR 13 south – Erin	Southern end of SR 13 concurrency
Montgomery				SR 149 west – Palmyra, Cumberland City, Erin	Eastern terminus of SR 149
Montgomery				Bridge over Cumberland River	
Montgomery	Clarksville			US 41A Byp. south (Riverside Drive/SR 12 south)	Southern end of US 41A Bypass/SR 12 concurrency; bypass for US 41A around downtown
Montgomery	Clarksville			US 41A Byp. north (Riverside Drive/SR 12 north/SR 13 north)	Northern end of US 41A Bypass/SR 12/SR 13 concurrency; bypass for US 41A around downtown; SR 48 becomes a secondary route
Montgomery	Clarksville			US 41A north (N 2nd Street/SR 76 south/SR 112 west) – Oak Grove, KY, Hopkinsville, KY	Southern end of US 41A/SR 76/SR 112 wrong-way concurrency; provides access to Fort Campbell
Montgomery	Clarksville			US 41A south (University Avenue/SR 76 north/SR 112 east) – Pleasant View	Northern end of US 41A/SR 76/SR 112 wrong-way concurrency
Montgomery	Clarksville			US 79 south (Kraft Street/SR 13 south) – Dover	Southern end of US 79/SR 13 concurrency
Montgomery	Clarksville			Bridge over Red River	
Montgomery	Clarksville			Dunbar Cave Road - Dunbar Cave State Park	
Montgomery	Clarksville			US 79 north (Wilma Rudolph Boulevard/SR 13 north) to I-24 – Guthrie, KY, Russellville, KY	Northern end of US 79/SR 13 concurrency
Montgomery	Clarksville			SR 374 (101st Airborne Division Parkway)	Partial beltway around Clarksville
Montgomery	Clarksville			SR 236 west (Tiny Town Road)	Eastern terminus of SR 236
Montgomery	Clarksville			I-24 – Paducah, Nashville	I-24 exit 1
Montgomery	Clarksville	103.86	167.15	KY 104 north (Clarksville Road) – Trenton, Elkton	Kentucky state line; northern terminus; SR 48 ends as a secondary route
1.000 mi = 1.609 km; 1.000 km = 0.621 mi: Concurrency terminus
