= Tennessee State Route 46 =

State highway in Tennessee, United States

State Route 46
- SR 46; primary in red, secondary in blue, unsigned in green

Route information
- Maintained by TDOT
- Length: 87.5 mi (140.8 km)
- Existed: October 1, 1923–present

Major junctions
- North end: US 79 near Indian Mound
- US 70 in Dickson; I-40 in Dickson; SR 100 / SR 7 in Bon Aqua; I-840 near Leipers Fork; Natchez Trace Parkway in Leipers Fork
- South end: US 431 near Franklin

Location
- Country: United States
- State: Tennessee
- Counties: Stewart, Houston, Dickson, Hickman, Williamson

Highway system
- Tennessee State Routes; Interstate; US; State
← SR 45	→ SR 47

State Route 46 (SR 46) is a north–south state highway located in Middle Tennessee. It mainly goes on a northwest to southeast course while passing through towns and cities such as Cumberland City, Dickson, Leipers Fork, along with mainly rural areas of Stewart, Houston, Dickson, Hickman and Williamson Counties.

Most of SR 46 is signed as a secondary route except for the route from US 70 in Dickson to the junction with SR 7 and SR 100 in Bon Aqua, which is signed as primary.

== Route description ==
=== Stewart County ===
SR 46 begins as a secondary highway in Stewart County just north of Indian Mound at a junction with US 79/SR 76. It goes south as a narrow and curvy country road, going through Indian Mound going through some hills. It then has a junction and becomes concurrent with SR 233, before they cross the Cumberland River on a ferry and immediately entering Cumberland City. They then separate at an intersection with SR 434, with SR 233 running west passing by the Cumberland Fossil Plant. SR 46 then runs south through downtown before having an intersection and short concurrency with SR 149 before crossing into Houston County.

=== Houston County ===
It then continues south to Guices Creek to intersect SR 13 before coming to an intersection and becoming concurrent with SR 49 and turning east with it. They then separate with SR 46 turning south again to cross into Dickson County.

=== Dickson and Hickman Counties ===
SR 46 then goes through a narrow valley before curving to the east and becoming concurrent with SR 235 and entering Dickson. They then come to an intersection with US 70/SR 1, where SR 235 goes through downtown and SR 46 follows US 70/SR 1 around downtown on a Bypass to the north and east, becoming a primary highway. They then have an interchange with SR 48 before SR 46 separates at another intersection and turns southeast, having another intersection with SR 235 before a junction with SR 47. SR 46 then has an interchange with I-40 before leaving Dickson and continuing southeast. It then goes through Abiff before entering Hickman County and Bon Aqua. It then comes to an intersection with SR 100 and SR 7, where SR 46 turns east and becomes concurrent with SR 100.

=== Williamson County ===
They then cross into Williamson County and SR 46 separates and turns south as a secondary highway again just before SR 100's interchange with I-840. It then goes through some farmland as it curves to the southeast and has its own interchange with I-840 before going through some mountains. SR 46 then has an interchange with the Natchez Trace Parkway before turning northeast and going through Leipers Fork. It then intersects SR 96 before going through more farmland. SR 46 then comes to an end at an intersection with US 431/SR 106 north of Franklin.

== Major intersections ==
County	Location	mi	km	Destinations	Notes
Stewart		0.0	0.0	US 79 (SR 76) – Dover, Clarksville	Northern terminus; SR 46 begins as a secondary highway
Stewart				SR 233 north (Hayes Ridge Road) – Woodlawn	Northern end of SR 233 concurrency
Stewart				Ferry across Cumberland River	
Stewart	Cumberland City			SR 233 south (Cumberland City Road) / SR 434 east (State Highway 149 Bus)	Southern end of SR 233 concurrency; western terminus of SR 434; SR 233 south provides access to the Cumberland Fossil Plant
Stewart	Cumberland City			SR 149 east – Palmyra, Clarksville	Northern end of SR 149 concurrency
Stewart				SR 149 west – Erin	Southern end of SR 149 concurrency
Houston	Guices Creek			SR 13 – Erin, Clarksville	
Houston				SR 49 west – Erin	Northern end of SR 49 concurrency
Houston				SR 49 east – Vanleer, Charlotte	Southern end of SR 49 concurrency
Dickson				SR 235 north (Sylvia Road) – Vanleer	Northern end of SR 235 concurrency; provides access to Dickson County Municipal Airport
Dickson	Dickson			US 70 west (Henslee Drive/SR 1 west) – McEwen	Northern end of US 70/SR 1 concurrency
Dickson	Dickson			US 70 Bus. east (W College Street/SR 235 south) – Downtown	Western terminus of US 70 Bus.; southern end of SR 235 concurrency
Dickson	Dickson			SR 48 (N Main Street) – Centerville, Downtown, Charlotte	Interchange
Dickson	Dickson			US 70 east (Henslee Drive/SR 1 east) – White Bluff	Southern end of US 70/SR 1 concurrency; SR 46 becomes a primary highway
Dickson	Dickson			US 70 Bus. (E College Street/SR 235) – Downtown, White Bluff	
Dickson	Dickson			SR 47 (E Walnut Street) – Downtown, Burns	
Dickson	Dickson			I-40 – Memphis, Nashville	Exit 172 on I-40
Hickman	Bon Aqua			SR 7 south (N Lick Creek Road) / SR 100 west – Centerville, Lyles, Santa Fe, Columbia	Northern end of SR 100 concurrency; northern terminus of SR 7; SR 46 turns secondary
Williamson				SR 100 east (Fairview Boulevard) to I-840 – Fairview	Southern end of SR 100 concurrency
Williamson				I-840 – Dickson, Franklin	Exit 14 on I-840; former SR 840
Williamson	Leipers Fork			Natchez Trace Parkway	Interchange
Williamson				SR 96 – Fairview, Franklin	
Williamson		87.50	140.82	US 431 (Hillsboro Road/SR 106) – Franklin, Forest Hills	Southern terminus; SR 46 ends as a secondary highway
1.000 mi = 1.609 km; 1.000 km = 0.621 mi: Concurrency terminus

== See also ==
- List of state routes in Tennessee
