= Tennessee State Route 235 =

State highway in Tennessee, United States

State Route 235
- SR 235 highlighted in red

Route information
- Maintained by TDOT
- Length: 27.3 mi (43.9 km)
- Existed: July 1, 1983–present

Major junctions
- South end: US 70 in Dickson
- SR 46 near Sylvia; SR 49 in Vanleer
- North end: SR 13 near Cunningham

Location
- Country: United States
- State: Tennessee
- Counties: Dickson, Montgomery

Highway system
- Tennessee State Routes; Interstate; US; State
← SR 234	→ SR 236

State Route 235 (SR 235) is a 27.3-mile-long (43.9 km) north–south state highway in Middle Tennessee. It connects Dickson to Cunningham via Sylvia, Vanleer, and Slayden.

== Route description ==
SR 235 begins in Dickson County as the unsigned companion route of US 70 Business in Dickson at an intersection with US 70/SR 1 (Henslee Drive/College Street). They go west along College Street to pass through a business district and by a hospital to have an intersection with SR 46 (Mathis Drive). The highway then passes through downtown, where it has an intersection with SR 48 (Church Street), before passing through neighborhoods and coming to another intersection with US 70/SR 1 (Henslee Drive), which is now concurrent with SR 46. Here, US 70 Business ends and SR 235 turns west on US 70/SR 1/SR 46 for a short distance before splitting off and turning north along West End Avenue, concurrent with SR 46. SR 46/SR 235 head northwest to leave Dickson and pass through residential areas, where SR 235 splits off to follow Sylvia Road and becomes signed for the first time. SR 235 heads north through farmland to pass by the Dickson County Municipal Airport before passing through the community of Sylvia. Shortly thereafter, SR 235 becomes concurrent with SR 49 and heads northwest to pass through Vanleer along Broad Street and School Street. SR 235 then splits off along Slayden-Marion Road to leave Vanleer and head north to pass through Slayden before entering hilly terrain and crossing into Montgomery County. The highway winds its way north through rural and hilly terrain as Marion Road for the next several miles before coming to an end just west of Cunningham at an intersection with SR 13.

== Major intersections ==
County	Location	mi	km	Destinations	Notes
Dickson	Dickson	0.0	0.0	US 70 (Henslee Drive/College Street/SR 1) – White Bluff, McEwen US 70 Bus. begins	Southern terminus; eastern terminus of US 70 Business; SR 235 begins as the unsigned companion route of US 70 Business
Dickson	Dickson			SR 46 (Mathis Drive) to I-40 – Bon Aqua	
Dickson	Dickson			SR 48 (Church Street) – Charlotte, Centerville	
Dickson	Dickson			US 70 east / SR 46 south (Henslee Drive/SR 1 east) – White Bluff US 70 Bus. ends	Eastern terminus of US 70 Business; southern end of US 70/SR 1/SR 46 concurrency
Dickson	Dickson			US 70 west (Henslee Drive/SR 1 west) – McEwen, Waverly	Northern end of US 70/SR 1 concurrency
Dickson				SR 46 north (Yellow Creek Road) – Cumberland City	Northern end of SR 46 concurrency; SR 235 becomes signed
Dickson				SR 49 east – Charlotte	Southern end of SR 49 concurrency
Dickson	Vanleer			SR 49 west – Erin	Northern end of SR 49 concurrency
Montgomery		27.3	43.9	SR 13 – Erin, Cunningham, Clarksville	Northern terminus
1.000 mi = 1.609 km; 1.000 km = 0.621 mi: Concurrency terminus
