= Tennessee State Route 13 =

Highway in Tennessee

State Route 13
- SR 13; primary in red, secondary in blue

Route information
- Maintained by TDOT
- Length: 153.01 mi (246.25 km)
- Existed: October 1, 1923–present

Major junctions
- South end: SR 17 at the Alabama state line near Fairview
- Natchez Trace Parkway in Collinwood; US 64 in Waynesboro; US 412 / SR 100 in Linden; I-40 in Hurricane Mills; US 70 in Waverly; US 41A Byp. in Clarksville; US 41A / US 79 in Clarksville; SR 374 in Clarksville; I-24 in Clarksville
- North end: US 79 at the Kentucky State Line near Guthrie, KY

Location
- Country: United States
- State: Tennessee
- Counties: Wayne, Perry, Humphreys, Houston, Montgomery

Highway system
- Tennessee State Routes; Interstate; US; State
| ← SR 12 | → SR 14 |

State Route 13 (SR 13), in the United States, is a south–north route from the Alabama border in Wayne County to the Kentucky border in Montgomery County. The entire route is located in western Middle Tennessee.

For the majority of its length, SR 13 is designated as a primary highway, except between Erin and Cunningham, which is designated as a secondary highway.

== Route description ==
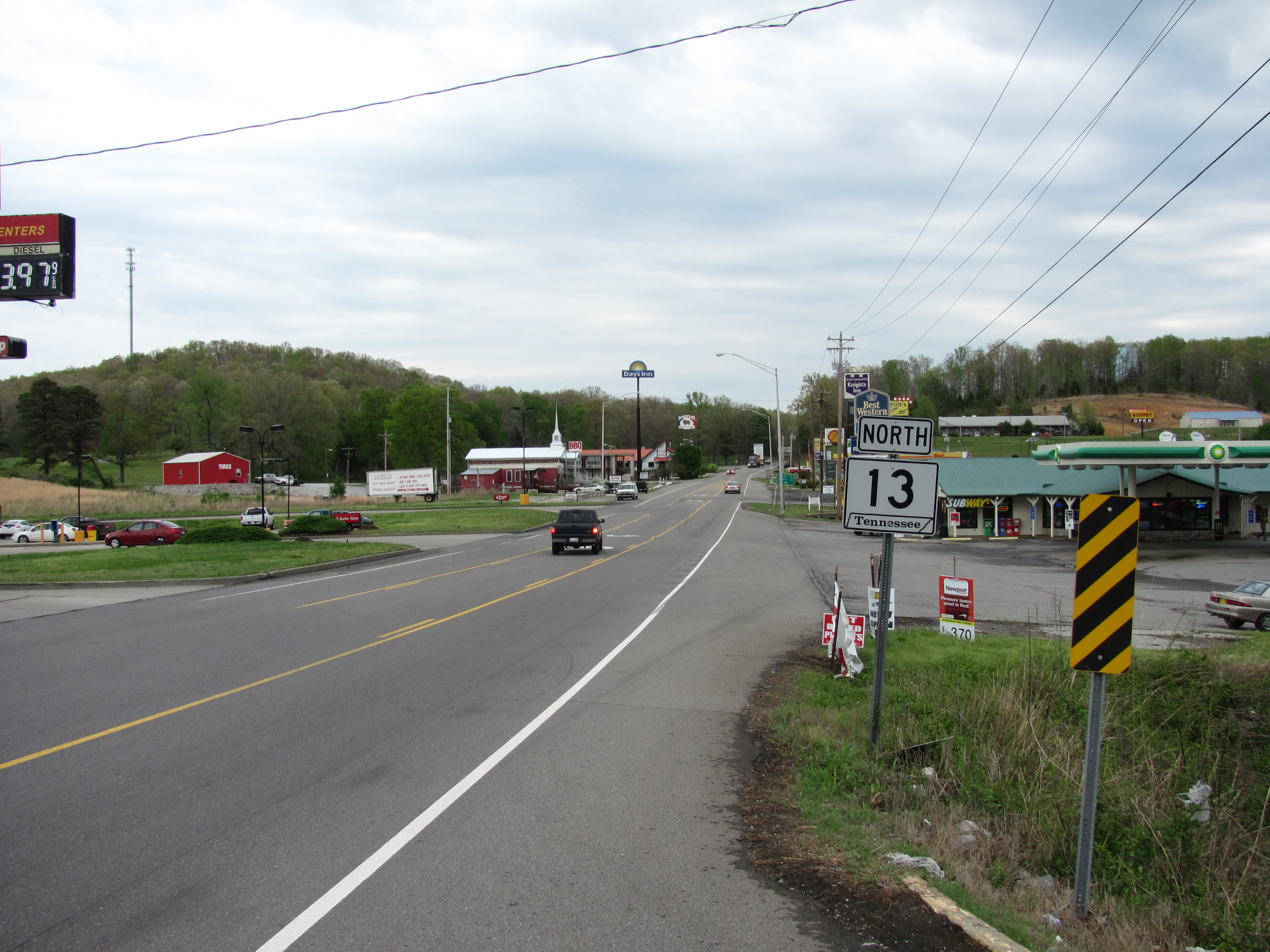
Northbound in Hurricane Mills, Tennessee

=== Wayne County ===
SR 13 begins at the Alabama state line in Wayne County just south of Fairview, where it continues south as SR 17. It then goes north through Fairview and has an intersection and short concurrency with SR 227 before continuing north, crossing under, and paralleling the Natchez Trace Parkway for a few miles to Collinwood, where it intersects with SR 203. It then goes through downtown and has an interchange with the Natchez Trace before finally leaving it and continuing north. SR 13 goes through some rural mountains and farmland before entering Waynesboro. It goes through downtown, passing by the Wayne County Courthouse, before having an interchange with US 64/SR 15 before leaving Waynesboro and continuing north. It then goes through more before curving through some mountains and intersecting SR 228. It then exits these mountains and crosses a narrow valley, where it has a crossing of the Buffalo River, before intersecting SR 48 and returning to the mountains and crosses into Perry County.

SR 13 does parallel the Green River for the majority of its course.

=== Perry County ===
SR 13 then heads northeast and has another Buffalo river crossing, this time over a very tall bridge, before turning north again. It then intersects SR 128 before entering Linden. In Linden, it intersects with US 412/SR 100/SR 20, while bypassing downtown to the east. It then leaves Linden and continues north. SR 13 then passes through Beardstown, where it intersects and has a short concurrency with SR 438 before paralleling the Buffalo River and entering Lobelville. It passes through Lobelville and continues north, still paralleling and also crossing the Buffalo River before crossing into Humphreys County.

=== Humphreys County ===
SR 13 then enters Hurricane Mills and has an interchange with I-40, at Exit 143. It then crosses the Duck River before passing by downtown and Loretta Lynn's home and ranch. It then leaves Hurricane Mills and continues north. SR 13 intersects with SR 230 before entering Waverly and having an intersection SR 13 Spur, a connector to US 70/SR 1 at Waverly. From Waverly, SR 13 continues north to cross into Houston County.

=== Houston County ===
It then intersects with SR 231 before entering Erin and has an intersection with SR 49, just east of its intersection with SR 149. SR 13 then turns east and has an intersection with SR 46 just south of Cumberland City before entering Montgomery County.

=== Montgomery County ===
It then passes south of Oak Ridge and intersects SR 235 before entering Cunningham, where it intersects and becomes concurrent with SR 48. SR 13/SR 48 then leaves Cunningham and continues north to intersect with SR 149 before crossing the Cumberland River and entering Clarksville. In Clarksville, it becomes concurrent to US 41A Bypass (US 41A Byp)/SR 12. They then start going up the west side of the city, SR 48 separates and turns east, while US 41A Byp/SR 12/SR 13 continues north to an intersection with US 41A/US 79/SR 76, where SR 13 leaves the bypass and heads east with US 79 and has another short concurrency with SR 48, where they cross the Red River and pass by Dunbar Cave State Park, before having an interchange with SR 374 (101st Airborne Division Parkway). US 79/SR 13 then go northeast and have an interchange with I-24 at Exit 4 before coming to the Kentucky state line, where US 79 continues into Kentucky and SR 13 ends.

== Special routes of SR 13 ==
=== Tennessee State Route 13 Spur ===
- Location: Waverly, Humphreys County
- Length: 0.5 mi (800 m)

State Route 13 Spur (SR 13 Spur) is a truck route in downtown Waverly, in Humphreys County. With a total length of 0.5 miles (0.80 km), the route includes portions of the following streets:

- East Main Street (from SR 13 to Cooley Avenue), and
- North Cooley Avenue (from Main Street to US 70/SR 1).

== Major intersections ==
| County | Location | mi | km | Destinations | Notes |
|---|---|---|---|---|---|
| Wayne | | 0.0 | 0.0 | SR 17 south (Chisolm Road) – Florence | Alabama state line; southern terminus; SR 13 begins as a primary highway |
| Wayne | Fairview | | | SR 227 east (Iron City Road) – Iron City | Southern end of SR 227 concurrency |
| Wayne | Fairview | | | SR 227 west (Pumping Station Road) to Natchez Trace Parkway – Cypress Inn | Northern end of SR 227 concurrency |
| Wayne | | | | Natchez Trace Parkway | Interchange |
| Wayne | Collinwood | | | SR 203 west (Bear Creek Road) – Olivet, Savannah | Eastern terminus of SR 203 |
| Wayne | Collinwood | | | E Broadway Street to Natchez Trace Parkway | E Broadway Street’s interchange with the Natchez Trace Parkway is only 400 feet east of SR 13 |
| Wayne | Waynesboro | | | US 64 (Veteran Memorial Parkway/SR 15) – Savannah, Lawrenceburg | Interchange |
| Wayne | | | | SR 228 west (Smith Branch Road) – Clifton | Eastern terminus of SR 228 |
| Wayne | | | | Bridge over the Buffalo River | |
| Wayne | | | | SR 48 north (Waynesboro Highway) – Hohenwald | Southern terminus of SR 48 |
| Perry | | | | SR 128 south (Clifton Road) – Clifton | Northern terminus of SR 128 |
| Perry | Linden | | | US 412 / SR 100 (SR 20/Main Street) – Parsons, Decaturville, Centerville, Hohenwald | |
| Perry | Beardstown | | | SR 438 east – Coble, Centerville | Southern end of SR 438 concurrency |
| Perry | Lobelville | | | SR 438 west (Toms Creek Road) – Parsons | Northern end of SR 438 concurrency; provides access to Mousetail Landing State Park |
| Perry | | | | Bridge over the Buffalo River | |
| Humphreys | Hurricane Mills | | | I-40 – Nashville, Memphis | I-40 exit 143 |
| Humphreys | Hurricane Mills | | | Bridge over the Duck River | |
| Humphreys | | | | SR 230 east (Bold Spring Road) to I-40 – Nunnelly, Centerville | Western terminus of SR 230 |
| Humphreys | Waverly | | | SR 13 Spur north (E Main Street) to US 70 (SR 1) – McEwen, Dickson, New Johnsonville, Camden | Southern terminus of SR 13 Spur |
| Humphreys | | | | Bridge over White Oak Creek | |
| Houston | | | | SR 231 south (McEwen Road) – McEwen | Northern terminus of SR 231 |
| Houston | Erin | | | SR 49 (Main Street) to SR 149 – Tennessee Ridge, Dover, Vanleer, Charlotte | SR 13 turns secondary |
| Houston | Guices Creek | | | SR 46 (Guices Creek Road/Cumberland City Road) – Cumberland City, Dickson | |
| Montgomery | | | | SR 235 south (Marion Road) – Slayden | Northern terminus of SR 235 |
| Montgomery | Cunningham | | | SR 48 south – Charlotte, Dickson | Southern end of SR 48 concurrency; SR 13 turns primary |
| Montgomery | Clarksville | | | SR 149 west – Palmyra, Cumberland City | Eastern terminus of SR 149 |
| Montgomery | Clarksville | | | Bridge over the Cumberland River | |
| Montgomery | Clarksville | | | US 41A Byp. south (S Riverside Street/SR 12 south) to US 41A – Ashland City | Southern end of US 41A Bypass/SR 12 concurrency; bypass of US 41A through downtown Clarksville; SR 13/SR 48 become unsigned |
| Montgomery | Clarksville | | | SR 48 north (College Street) – Downtown | Northern end of SR 48 concurrency |
| Montgomery | Clarksville | | | US 41A / US 79 (Providence Boulevard/N 2nd Street/SR 12 north/SR 76/SR 112 east) to I-24 – Oak Grove, KY, Hopkinsville, KY, Dover, Downtown | Northern terminus of US 41A Bypass; western terminus of SR 112; northern end of SR 12 concurrency; southern end of unsigned US 79 concurrency |
| Montgomery | Clarksville | | | SR 48 south (College Street) – Downtown | Southern end of SR 48 concurrency |
| Montgomery | Clarksville | | | Bridge over the Red River | |
| Montgomery | Clarksville | | | Dunbar Cave Road - Dunbar Cave State Park | |
| Montgomery | Clarksville | | | SR 48 north (Trenton Road) – Trenton, KY | Northern end of SR 48 concurrency |
| Montgomery | Clarksville | | | SR 374 (101st Airborne Division Parkway) | Interchange; beltway around the northern and eastern sides of Clarksville |
| Montgomery | Clarksville | | | I-24 – Paducah, Nashville | I-24 exit 4 |
| Montgomery | | 153.01 | 246.25 | US 79 north (Russellville Road) – Guthrie, Russellville | Kentucky state line; northern terminus; US 79 continues north into Kentucky; SR 13 ends as an unsigned highway |
1.000 mi = 1.609 km; 1.000 km = 0.621 mi: Concurrency terminus

== See also ==
- List of state routes in Tennessee
