= Tennessee State Route 233 =

Secondary state highway

State Route 233
- SR 233 highlighted in red

Route information
- Maintained by TDOT
- Length: 23.7 mi (38.1 km)
- Existed: July 1, 1983–present

Major junctions
- West end: SR 49 in Carlisle
- SR 46 / SR 434 in Cumberland City
- East end: US 79 in Woodlawn

Location
- Country: United States
- State: Tennessee
- Counties: Stewart, Montgomery

Highway system
- Tennessee State Routes; Interstate; US; State
← SR 232	→ SR 234

State Route 233 (SR 233) is a secondary state highway located in northwestern Middle Tennessee. The length of the route is an estimated total of 23.7 miles (38.1 km) through southern Stewart and southwestern Montgomery Counties.

== Route description ==
SR 233 begins in southern Stewart County at a junction with SR 49 in Carlisle. SR 233 goes on an easterly course, running parallel to the Cumberland River to enter Cumberland City, where it passes by the Cumberland Fossil Plant before entering downtown. It then comes to an intersection with SR 46 and SR 434, where it becomes concurrent with SR 46 to cross the Cumberland River via a ferry. SR 233 separates from SR 46 and winds its way northeast to cross into Montgomery County. SR 233 continues to wind its way northeast through rural areas before coming to an end at a junction with US 79 (SR 76) on the western edge of Woodlawn.

=== Points of interest ===
The most notable point of interest along SR 233 is the TVA-operated Cumberland Fossil Plant.

== Major intersections ==
County	Location	mi	km	Destinations	Notes
Stewart	Carlisle	0.0	0.0	SR 49 – Dover, Tennessee Ridge, Erin	Western terminus
Stewart	Cumberland City			SR 46 south (Main Street) / SR 434 east (State Highway 149 Bus) to SR 149 – Dickson	Western end of SR 46 concurrency; western terminus of SR 434
Stewart	Cumberland City			Ferry across the Cumberland River	
Stewart				SR 46 north (County Highway 351) – Indian Mound	Eastern end of SR 46 concurrency
Montgomery	Woodlawn	23.7	38.1	US 79 (SR 76) – Dover, Clarksville	Eastern terminus
1.000 mi = 1.609 km; 1.000 km = 0.621 mi: Concurrency terminus
