= Tennessee State Route 49 =

State highway in Tennessee, United States

State Route 49
- SR 49; primary in red, secondary in blue

Route information
- Maintained by TDOT
- Length: 104.57 mi (168.29 km)
- Existed: October 1, 1923–present

Major junctions
- West end: US 79 in Dover
- SR 149 in Erin; SR 13 in Erin; SR 48 in Charlotte; SR 12 in Ashland City; US 41A in Pleasant View; I-24 in Pleasant View; US 41 / US 431 / SR 76 in Springfield; SR 25 east of Springfield
- East end: KY 383 at Kentucky state line near Orlinda

Location
- Country: United States
- State: Tennessee
- Counties: Stewart, Houston, Dickson, Cheatham, Robertson

Highway system
- Tennessee State Routes; Interstate; US; State
← SR 48	→ SR 50

State Route 49 (SR 49) is a state highway in Tennessee. The route forms a broad southern arc that passes through the rural Middle Tennessee towns of Dover, Erin, Charlotte, Ashland City, Pleasant View, and Springfield.

== Route description ==
SR 49 begins in Stewart County in downtown Dover at a junction with US 79/SR 76 as a primary highway. It goes east, paralleling the Cumberland River before turning south and having an intersection with SR 233. It then goes through some farmland and hills before crossing into Houston County.

SR 49 then immediately enters Tennessee Ridge and comes to an intersection with SR 147, where SR 49 turns east again towards Erin. SR 49 then enters Erin shortly afterwards, going straight through downtown before having an intersection with SR 149. It then intersects with SR 13 less than 1/2 mile (0.80 km) later. It then goes through some more hills and farmland, having an intersection and concurrency with SR 46 before crossing into Dickson County.

SR 49 then goes through some more hills before having an intersection and becoming concurrent with SR 235 and entering Vanleer. They then go through Vanleer, turning to the south temporarily then turning east again, before SR 235 breaks off and goes south, and SR 49 continues east. SR 49 then goes through more hills and farmland before entering Charlotte and having an intersection and short concurrency with SR 48, just north of its intersection with SR 47. SR 49 then goes through downtown and intersects Old State Hwy. 47, an old alignment of SR 47, before leaving Charlotte and becoming very curvy, going northeast.

It then enters Cheatham County and has a crossing of the Harpeth River before intersecting SR 250 and begins paralleling the Cumberland River again, becomes concurrent with SR 249, crosses the Cumberland River, and enters Ashland City. SR 49/SR 249 then intersect with SR 455 (Tennessee Waltz Parkway/Ashland City Bypass), a bypass for SR 12, before entering downtown and having an intersection and short concurrency with SR 12. SR 249 then separates and goes east and SR 49 turns north. SR 49 then enters Pleasant View and intersects US 41A/SR 112 before having an interchange with I-24 and crossing into Robertson County.

It then goes northeast to Coopertown where it intersects SR 257. SR 49 then goes through some farmland before entering Springfield. It then enters downtown and comes to an intersection with US 41/US 431/SR 11/SR 65/SR 76, with SR 76 becoming concurrent with SR 49. SR 76 then separates and turns east while SR 49 leaves Springfield and continues northeast. It then intersects and has a short concurrency with SR 25 before becoming a secondary highway and going through some more farmland. It then becomes curvy before entering Orlinda and intersecting SR 52 in the center of town. SR 49 then continues north to the Kentucky state line, where it continues as KY 383.

== History ==
SR 49's route between Springfield and the Kentucky state line once formed an alternate route of the Dixie Highway system, bypassing the main route from Springfield to Russellville, Kentucky. The conditions of the road were described as poor.

SR 49's course from Springfield to Orlinda, along with SR 52's eastward course from Orlinda to Portland, was signed as SR 75 until the late 1920s.

Until the 2000s, SR 49 extended north on The Trace Road to the Kentucky border. Sometime in the 2000s, this portion was redesignated as SR 461. Google Maps and some recent road maps still displays SR 461 as SR 49.

== Major intersections ==
County	Location	mi	km	Destinations	Notes
Stewart	Dover	0.0	0.0	US 79 (Fort Donelson Parkway/SR 76) – Paris, Clarksville	Western terminus; SR 49 begins as a primary highway; provides access to Land Between the Lakes National Recreation Area
Stewart	Carlisle	9.7	15.6	SR 233 east (Cumberland City Road) – Cumberland City	Western terminus of SR 233
Houston	Tennessee Ridge	17.1	27.5	SR 147 west (N Main Street) – Big Sandy, McKinnon	Eastern terminus of SR 147
Houston	Erin	21.9	35.2	SR 149 east (Cumberland City Highway) – Cumberland City, Clarksville	Western terminus of SR 149
Houston	Erin	22.1	35.6	SR 13 (Waverly Highway/Clarksville Highway) – Waverly, Clarksville	
Houston	Erin	26.0	41.8	SR 46 north – Cumberland City	Western end of SR 46 concurrency
Houston		31.2	50.2	SR 46 south – Dickson	Eastern end of SR 46 concurrency
Dickson	Vanleer	36.2	58.3	SR 235 north (Slayden-Marion Road) – Slayden, Cunningham	Western end of SR 235 concurrency
Dickson	Vanleer	39.8	64.1	SR 235 south (Sylvia Road) – Dickson	Eastern end of SR 235 concurrency
Dickson	Charlotte	46.3	74.5	SR 48 north – Clarksville	Western end of SR 48 concurrency
Dickson	Charlotte	47.1	75.8	SR 48 south – Dickson	Eastern end of SR 48 concurrency
Cheatham	Ashland City	64.2	103.3	SR 250 south (Petway Road) – White Bluff	Northern terminus of SR 250; provides access to the Cheatham State Wildlife Management Area
Cheatham	Ashland City	66.6	107.2	SR 249 west (River Road) – Pegram	Western end of SR 249 concurrency
Cheatham	Ashland City	67.3	108.3	SR 455 (Tennessee Waltz Parkway)	Ashland City bypass for SR 12
Cheatham	Ashland City	67.6	108.8	SR 12 north (Main Street) – Clarksville	Western end of SR 12 concurrency
Cheatham	Ashland City	67.7	109.0	SR 12 south (Main Street) – Nashville	Eastern end of SR 12 concurrency
Cheatham	Ashland City	69.8	112.3	SR 249 east (Bearwallow Road)	Eastern end of SR 249 concurrency
Cheatham	Pleasant View	77.1	124.1	US 41A (SR 112) – Clarksville, Nashville	
Robertson	Pleasant View	77.3	124.4	I-24 – Clarksville, Nashville	I-24 exit 24
Robertson	Coopertown	83.2	133.9	SR 257 east – Ridgetop	Western terminus of SR 257
Robertson	Springfield	88.7	142.7	US 41 / US 431 / SR 76 west (Memorial Boulevard/SR 11/SR 65)	Western end of SR 76 concurrency
Robertson	Springfield	89.8	144.5	SR 76 east – White House	Eastern end of SR 76 concurrency
Robertson	Springfield	94.0	151.3	SR 25 west – Barren Plains	Western end of SR 25 concurrency
Robertson		95.0	152.9	SR 25 east – Cross Plains	Eastern end of SR 25 concurrency; SR 49 turns secondary
Robertson	Orlinda	101.0	162.5	SR 52 east to I-65 – Portland	Western terminus of SR 52
Robertson	Orlinda	104.6	168.3	KY 383 north (Springfield Road) – Franklin, KY	Eastern terminus; continuation into Kentucky; SR 49 ends as a secondary highway
1.000 mi = 1.609 km; 1.000 km = 0.621 mi: Concurrency terminus
