= Tennessee State Route 231 =

State highway in Tennessee, United States

State Route 231
- SR 231 highlighted in red

Route information
- Maintained by TDOT
- Length: 13.7 mi (22.0 km)
- Existed: July 1, 1983–present

Major junctions
- South end: US 70 in McEwen
- North end: SR 13 near Erin

Location
- Country: United States
- State: Tennessee
- Counties: Humphreys, Houston

Highway system
- Tennessee State Routes; Interstate; US; State
← US 231	→ SR 232

State Route 231 (SR 231) is a 13.7-mile-long (22.0 km) north-south state highway in the hills of western Middle Tennessee. It serves to connect the towns of McEwen and Erin.

== Route description ==
SR 231 begins in Humphreys County in downtown McEwen at an intersection with US 70/SR 1. It heads north as Main Street to pass through neighborhoods before leaving McEwen and passing northwest through farmland for several miles as Erin Road. The highway then crosses over a wooded ridge just before crossing over White Oak Creek and entering Houston County. SR 231 then winds its way northwest as McEwen Road to cross another ridge before traveling up a narrow valley, where comes to an end at an intersection with SR 13 just south of Erin. The entire route of SR 231 is a two-lane Highway and lies entirely atop the Highland Rim.

== Major intersections ==
County	Location	mi	km	Destinations	Notes
Humphreys	McEwen	0.0	0.0	US 70 (SR 1) – Waverly, Dickson	Southern terminus
Humphreys				Bridge over White Oak Creek	
Houston		13.7	22.0	SR 13 – Erin, Waverly	Northern terminus
1.000 mi = 1.609 km; 1.000 km = 0.621 mi
