= Tennessee State Route 149 =

State highway in Tennessee, United States

State Route 149
- SR 149 highlighted in red

Route information
- Maintained by TDOT
- Length: 22.31 mi (35.90 km)

Major junctions
- West end: SR 49 in Erin
- SR 46 in Cumberland City; SR 434 in Cumberland City
- East end: SR 13 / SR 48 near Clarksville

Location
- Country: United States
- State: Tennessee
- Counties: Houston, Stewart, Montgomery

Highway system
- Tennessee State Routes; Interstate; US; State
← SR 148	→ SR 150

State Route 149 (SR 149) is an east–west highway in Middle Tennessee. The road begins near Erin and ends just south of Clarksville. The current length is 22.31 miles (35.90 km).

== Route description ==
SR 149 begins in Houston County in Erin at an intersection with SR 49 near that route's junction with SR 13 just outside of Erin. SR 149 then goes northward and crosses into Stewart County.

It continues north and runs concurrently with SR 46 before entering Cumberland City. In Cumberland City, SR 46 breaks off and goes through downtown, while SR 149 bypasses the town to the east. It then intersects the short SR 434, a connector to SR 233 and provides access to the Cumberland Fossil Plant. SR 149 turns to the northeast to parallel the Cumberland River and enters Montgomery County.

It then goes east through Palmyra before ending at intersection with SR 13 and SR 48 just south of Clarksville.

== Major intersections ==
County	Location	mi	km	Destinations	Notes
Houston	Erin	0.0	0.0	SR 49 (E Main Street) – Tennessee Ridge, Vanleer	Western terminus
Stewart	Cumberland City			SR 46 south (Guices Creek Road)	Western end of SR 46 concurrency
Stewart	Cumberland City			SR 46 north (Main Street) – Downtown, Indian Mound	Eastern end of SR 46 concurrency
Stewart	Cumberland City			SR 434 west (State Highway 149 Bus.) – Downtown	Eastern terminus of SR 434
Montgomery		22.31	35.90	SR 13 / SR 48 – Clarksville, Charlotte, Erin	Eastern terminus
1.000 mi = 1.609 km; 1.000 km = 0.621 mi: Concurrency terminus
