= List of state routes in Tennessee shorter than one mile =

The following is a list of state highways in Tennessee shorter than one mile (1.6 km) in length. Most of these highways act as service roads, old alignments of more prominent highways, or connectors between one or more highways. Several of these highways have their own articles; those highways are summarized here and a link is provided to the main article. This list does not include highways where at least one highway of that number is at least one mile in length. All highways at least one mile in length have their own article.

== State Route 239 ==
State Route 239
- Location: Dresden
- Length: 0.72 mi (1,160 m)
- Existed: July 1, 1983–present

State Route 239 (SR 239), also known as Pikeview Street, is an east–west state highway located entirely in Weakley County in West Tennessee. It connects SR 22 with SR 89 and SR 54 in the county seat of Dresden. The entire route of SR 239 is a two-lane highway passing through residential areas. It is also a former alignment of SR 22, prior to the new four-lane bypass being built to the south.

The entire route is in Dresden, Weakley County.

| mi | km | Destinations | Notes |
|---|---|---|---|
| 0.00 | 0.00 | SR 22 – Martin, Gleason | Western terminus |
| 0.72 | 1.16 | SR 89 (W Main Street/Pikeview Street) – Sharon, Downtown, Palmersville | Eastern terminus |
1.000 mi = 1.609 km; 1.000 km = 0.621 mi

== State Route 301 ==
State Route 301
- Location: Northwestern Bledsoe County
- Length: 0.9 mi (1,400 m)
- Existed: July 1, 1983–present

State Route 301 (SR 301) is a 0.9-mile-long (1.4 km) state highway located entirely in Bledsoe County, Tennessee. The route originates at a junction with SR 285 in Mount Crest within Bledsoe State Forest, and its northern terminus is at a dead end at the Bledsoe County Correctional Complex's Tricor Farm facility, formerly the Taft Youth Center, a facility of the Tennessee Department of Children's Services. The entire route of SR 301 is a rural two-lane highway.

The entire route is in Bledsoe County.

| Location | mi | km | Destinations | Notes |
|---|---|---|---|---|
| | 0.0 | 0.0 | SR 285 (Glade Creek Road) – Mount Crest, Doyle | Southern terminus |
| Tricor Farm | 0.9 | 1.4 | Main Gate at BCCX Tricor Farm main entrance | Northern terminus |
1.000 mi = 1.609 km; 1.000 km = 0.621 mi

== State Route 316 ==
State Route 316
- Location: Chattanooga
- Length: 0.4 mi (640 m)
- Existed: July 1, 1983–present

State Route 316 (SR 316) is an unsigned 0.4-mile-long (0.64 km) state highway located entirely in Hamilton County, and the city of Chattanooga, Tennessee. It follows M.L.K. Boulevard between US 27 (I-124/SR 27/SR 29) to SR 2 in downtown Chattanooga.

== State Route 356 ==
State Route 356
- Location: Paris
- Length: 0.95 mi (1,530 m)
- Existed: July 1, 1983–present

State Route 356 (SR 356), also known as E Wood Street, is a 0.95-mile-long (1.53 km) state highway in Henry County that serves as a connector between US 641/SR 69 in downtown Paris to US 79 (SR 76) on the town's east side. Excluding its eastern end, the entire route of SR 356 is a two-lane highway. It also follows of a former alignment of US 79 (SR 76).

The entire route is in Paris, Henry County.

| mi | km | Destinations | Notes |
|---|---|---|---|
| 0.0 | 0.0 | US 641 / SR 54 / SR 69 (Market Street/W Wood Street) – Camden, Dresden, Cottage Grove, Puryear | Western terminus |
| 0.95 | 1.53 | US 79 (Tyson Avenue/E Wood Street/SR 76) – McKenzie, Henry, Dover | Eastern terminus |
1.000 mi = 1.609 km; 1.000 km = 0.621 mi

== State Route 389 ==
State Route 389
- Location: Chattanooga
- Length: 0.3 mi (480 m)
- Existed: July 1, 1983–present

State Route 389 (SR 389) is a 0.3-mile-long (0.48 km) state highway in the Chattanooga area in Hamilton County. The route follows 4th Street between I-124/US 27 and SR 8 in downtown Chattanooga.

== State Route 418 ==
State Route 418
- Location: Mountain City
- Length: 0.87 mi (1,400 m)

State Route 418 (SR 418) is a connector route in Johnson County that connects US 421 (SR 34) to downtown Mountain City.

SR 418 begins at US 421/SR 34/SR 67 south of downtown Mountain City, and heads north to junction with the former alignment of SR 91 in downtown and then turns west and ends at US 421/SR 34/SR 67.

SR 418 formerly ended at SR 91 in downtown Mountain City, until SR 91 was rerouted to a new alignment north of downtown.

The entire route is in Mountain City, Johnson County.

| mi | km | Destinations | Notes |
|---|---|---|---|
| 0.0 | 0.0 | US 421 / SR 67 (Shady Street/SR 34) | Southern terminus |
| 0.5 | 0.80 | North Church Street To SR 91 – Damascus | Former SR 91 North |
| 0.8 | 1.3 | US 421 (Shady Street/SR 34) / SR 67 (West Main Street / Shady Street) – Elizabethton, Shady Valley, Boone | Northern terminus |
1.000 mi = 1.609 km; 1.000 km = 0.621 mi

== State Route 434 ==
State Route 434
- Location: Cumberland City
- Length: 0.5 mi (800 m)

State Route 434 (SR 434) is a 0.50-mile-long (0.80 km) east–west state highway located entirely in Stewart County in northwestern Middle Tennessee. It originates at the SR 46 junction with SR 233 in Cumberland City, and ends at SR 149 on the east side of town near the Guices Creek Recreation Area.

The entire route is in Cumberland City, Stewart County.

| mi | km | Destinations | Notes |
|---|---|---|---|
| 0.00 | 0.00 | SR 46 north (Barren Fork Lane) / SR 233 (Cumberland City Road) | Western terminus; western end of SR 46 concurrency |
| 0.01 | 0.016 | SR 46 south (Main Street) | Eastern end of SR 46 concurrency |
| 0.50 | 0.80 | SR 149 – Clarksville, Erin | Eastern terminus |
1.000 mi = 1.609 km; 1.000 km = 0.621 mi: Concurrency terminus

== State Route 446 ==
State Route 446
- Location: Maryville, Blount County
- Length: 0.3 mi (480 m)

State Route 446 (SR 446), also known as Foothills Mall Drive, is an unsigned four-lane state highway in Maryville, Blount County, Tennessee. The 0.3-mile-long (0.48 km) route connects US 321 (SR 73) with US 129 (SR 115), while also providing access to Foothills Mall.

The entire route is in Maryville, Blount County.

| mi | km | Destinations | Notes |
|---|---|---|---|
| 0.0 | 0.0 | US 321 (W Lamar Alexander Parkway/SR 73) – Lenoir City, Friendsville, Townsend, Pigeon Forge | Western terminus; road continues west as Foothills Mall Drive |
| 0.3 | 0.48 | US 129 (Highway 129 Bypass/SR 115) – Vonore, Knoxville | Eastern terminus; provides access to McGhee Tyson Airport |
1.000 mi = 1.609 km; 1.000 km = 0.621 mi

== State Route 447 ==
State Route 447
- Location: Maryville
- Length: 0.16 mi (260 m)

State Route 447 (SR 447), also known as S Washington Street, is a supplemental route in the Blount County, Tennessee, seat of Maryville. The 0.16-mile-long (0.26 km) route connects US 321 (SR 73) with US 411 (SR 35) on Maryville's east side. It is a 4-lane undivided highway with a center turn lane for its entire length. SR 447 is the shortest state highway in Tennessee.

The entire route is in Maryville, Blount County.

| mi | km | Destinations | Notes |
|---|---|---|---|
| 0.000 | 0.000 | US 321 (Lamar Alexander Parkway/SR 73) – Lenoir City, Friendsville, Townsend, Pigeon Forge | Southern terminus |
| 0.159 | 0.256 | US 411 (S Washington Street/High Street/SR 35) – Vonore, Downtown, Seymour | Northern terminus |
1.000 mi = 1.609 km; 1.000 km = 0.621 mi

== State Route 448 ==
State Route 448
- Location: Sevierville
- Length: 0.63 mi (1,010 m)
- Existed: 2006–present

State Route 448 (SR 448) is a 0.63-mile-long (1.01 km) state route located entirely in Sevier County in East Tennessee. It serves as a continuation of the Great Smoky Mountains Parkway that bypasses the county seat of Sevierville. It connects SR 66 north of downtown to US 441 (SR 71) south of downtown, thereby making up the continuous route between I-40 and the Pigeon Forge-Gatlinburg tourist areas. It is more commonly known as North Parkway. There are three northbound lanes, a center turn lane, and one southbound lane. This is in order to accommodate for the traffic heading north out of the busy tourist area, since the majority of the southbound traffic enters via SR 66. The posted speed limit is 35 miles per hour (56 km/h).

The entire route is in Sevierville, Sevier County.

| mi | km | Destinations | Notes |
|---|---|---|---|
| 0.0 | 0.0 | US 411 (Main Street/SR 35) – Seymour, Newport | Southern terminus |
| 0.6 | 0.97 | SR 66 (Winfield Dunn Parkway) to I-40 – Kodak, Pigeon Forge | Northern terminus |
1.000 mi = 1.609 km; 1.000 km = 0.621 mi

== State Route 450 ==
State Route 450
- Location: Knoxville
- Length: 0.34 mi (550 m)
- Existed: 2002–present

State Route 450 (SR 450) is an unsigned state route located entirely in Knox County in East Tennessee. The 0.34-mile-long (0.55 km) route, known locally as Joe Johnson Drive, connects US 11/70 (Neyland Drive, SR 1/SR 158) with Volunteer Boulevard on the campus of the University of Tennessee (UT) on the west side of downtown Knoxville. SR 450 was first proposed in 1972 when UT Dean of Agriculture O. Glen Hall requested a pedestrian bridge be built to connect UT's agriculture campus to the main campus. The project was picked up by TDOT in 1998, with new plans consisting of a four-lane vehicular bridge with a bike lane and sidewalk. Construction on the project began in the fall of 2000 and completed in the summer of 2002 at a cost of $7.1 million.

SR 450 begins at an intersection with US 11/US 70/SR 1/SR 158 (Neyland Drive). It travels to the northeast, crossing through the agricultural campus of the University of Tennessee at Knoxville and over a CSX rail line. It meets its Eastern terminus, an intersection with Volunteer Blvd on the west side of the main campus of The University of Tennessee at Knoxville.

The entire route is in Knoxville, Knox County.

| mi | km | Destinations | Notes |
|---|---|---|---|
| 0.0 | 0.0 | US 11 / US 70 (Neyland Drive/SR 1/SR 158) | Western terminus; provides access to US 129 (Alcoa Highway) |
| 0.21– 0.34 | 0.34– 0.55 | Bridge over CSX Rail line | |
| 0.34 | 0.55 | Volunteer Boulevard | Eastern terminus; road continues as Andy Holt Avenue |
1.000 mi = 1.609 km; 1.000 km = 0.621 mi

== See also ==
- List of state routes in Tennessee
