= 2012 United States presidential election in Tennessee =

- November 6, 2012
- Turnout: 61.86% (▼4.48 pp)

Nominee	Mitt Romney	Barack Obama
Party	Republican	Democratic
Home state	Massachusetts	Illinois
Running mate	Paul Ryan	Joe Biden
Electoral vote	11	0
Popular vote	1,462,330	960,709
Percentage	59.42%	39.04%

Romney
40–50%
50–60%
60–70%
70–80%
80–90%
90–100%
Obama
40–50%
50–60%
60–70%
70–80%
80–90%
90–100%
Tie/No data
President before election
Barack Obama
Democratic
Elected President
Barack Obama
Democratic

The 2012 United States presidential election in Tennessee was held on November 6, 2012, as part of the 2012 United States presidential election in which all 50 states plus the District of Columbia participated. Tennessee voters chose 11 electors to represent them in the Electoral College via a popular vote pitting incumbent Democratic President Barack Obama and his running mate, Vice President Joe Biden, against Republican challenger and former Massachusetts Governor Mitt Romney and his running mate, Congressman Paul Ryan.

Romney easily carried Tennessee's 11 electoral votes, with 59.42% of the statewide vote to Obama's 39.04% and a 20.38% margin of victory. Tennessee has not voted for a Democratic presidential nominee since 1996, when Bill Clinton of neighboring Arkansas won it along with many other Southern states, nor has the state done so with a majority of the vote share since Jimmy Carter of neighboring Georgia carried it in 1976. Thus, Tennessee has been seen as part of the modern-day red wall in the 21st century. After 1996, the state has been growing more Republican with almost each election.

Winning Tennessee by 501,621 votes, Mitt Romney achieved his second-largest margin of victory by vote count nationwide, surpassed only by his 1,261,719-vote margin in Texas, also located in the South. Romney gained ground in every county, significantly outperforming prior GOP presidential candidates in rural areas, particularly in Middle Tennessee. Notably, Romney also flipped two counties, Houston and Jackson, to the Republican column. Both of these majority-white counties had been Democratic strongholds with their strong ties to secessionism: they had each only voted for a Republican presidential nominee once prior to this election, in 1928 and 1920, respectively. Thus, Obama became the first Democrat to be elected without either county. As of the 2024 presidential election, this is the last time in which Hardeman County was won by the Democratic presidential nominee.

As consistent with the rest of the country, Obama carried heavily populated and diverse counties. The largest county, Shelby, was won by Obama by a 26.05% margin due to it being home to Memphis, Tennessee's largest city. In addition, the home of the state capital of Nashville, Davidson County, went to Obama by 18.53%. Hardeman and Haywood counties, both low-populated rural counties in West Tennessee, also went to Obama due to their high African American populations (42.2% and 50.6%, respectively). However, rural areas – including areas in the northwestern portion of the state that had long favored Democratic candidates – saw heavy margins for Romney, allowing him to offset Obama's wins in large cities. The eastern region of the state in Appalachia, some of the most historically Republican and Unionist counties in the country, saw margins of over 70% for the Republican ticket. This was the first election since 1908 in which Tennessee backed the national loser a second consecutive time. Obama is the only Democrat to ever win two terms without carrying the state at least once.

== Primary elections ==
=== Democratic primary ===
Tennessee Democratic primary, 2012
- March 6, 2012

Candidate	Barack Obama	Uncommitted
Home state	Illinois	N/A
Delegate count	82	0
Popular vote	80,357	10,497
Percentage	88.48%	11.51%
- Primary results by county Obama: 60–65% 65–70% 70–75% 75–80% 80–85% 85–90% 90–95% 95–100%

The 2012 Democratic primary in Tennessee took place on Super Tuesday, March 6, 2012, with Barack Obama receiving 80,355 (88.5%) votes. Other candidates received a combined total of 10,411 (11.5%) votes. Tennessee had a total of 91 delegates to the 2012 Democratic National Convention, of which 82 were pledged to presidential contenders depending on the popular vote. The remaining 9 super-delegates were unbound.

Tennessee Democratic primary, 2012
Candidate	Popular vote		Delegates		
Candidate	Count	Percentage	Pledged delegates	Super delegates	Total delegates
Barack Obama (incumbent)	80,705	88.48%	82	9	91
Uncommitted	10,497	11.51%	0	0	0
John Wolfe Jr. (write-in)	7	0.00%	0	0	0
Total:	91,209	100.00%	82	9	91

=== Republican primary ===
Tennessee Republican primary, 2012
- March 6, 2012
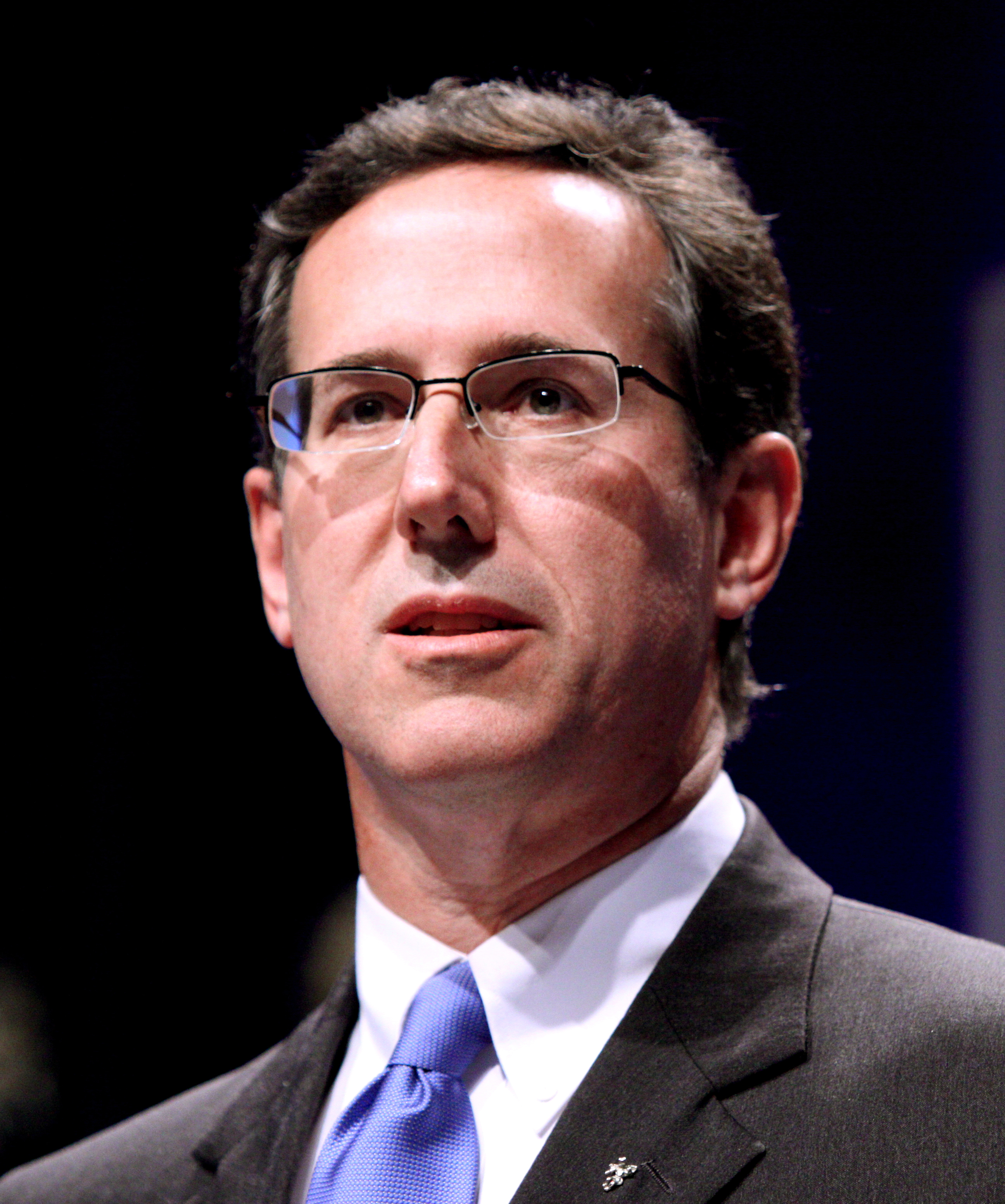

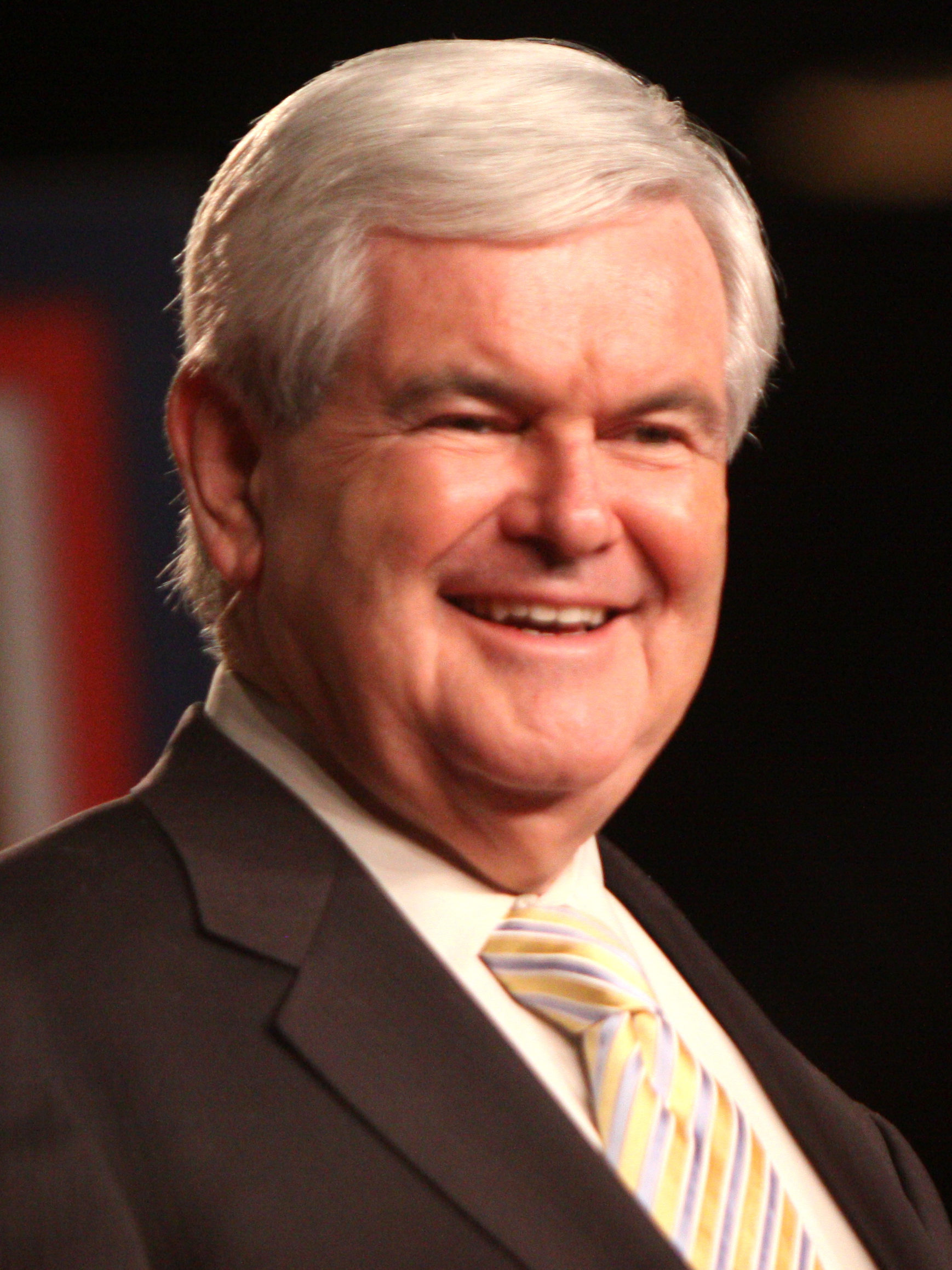

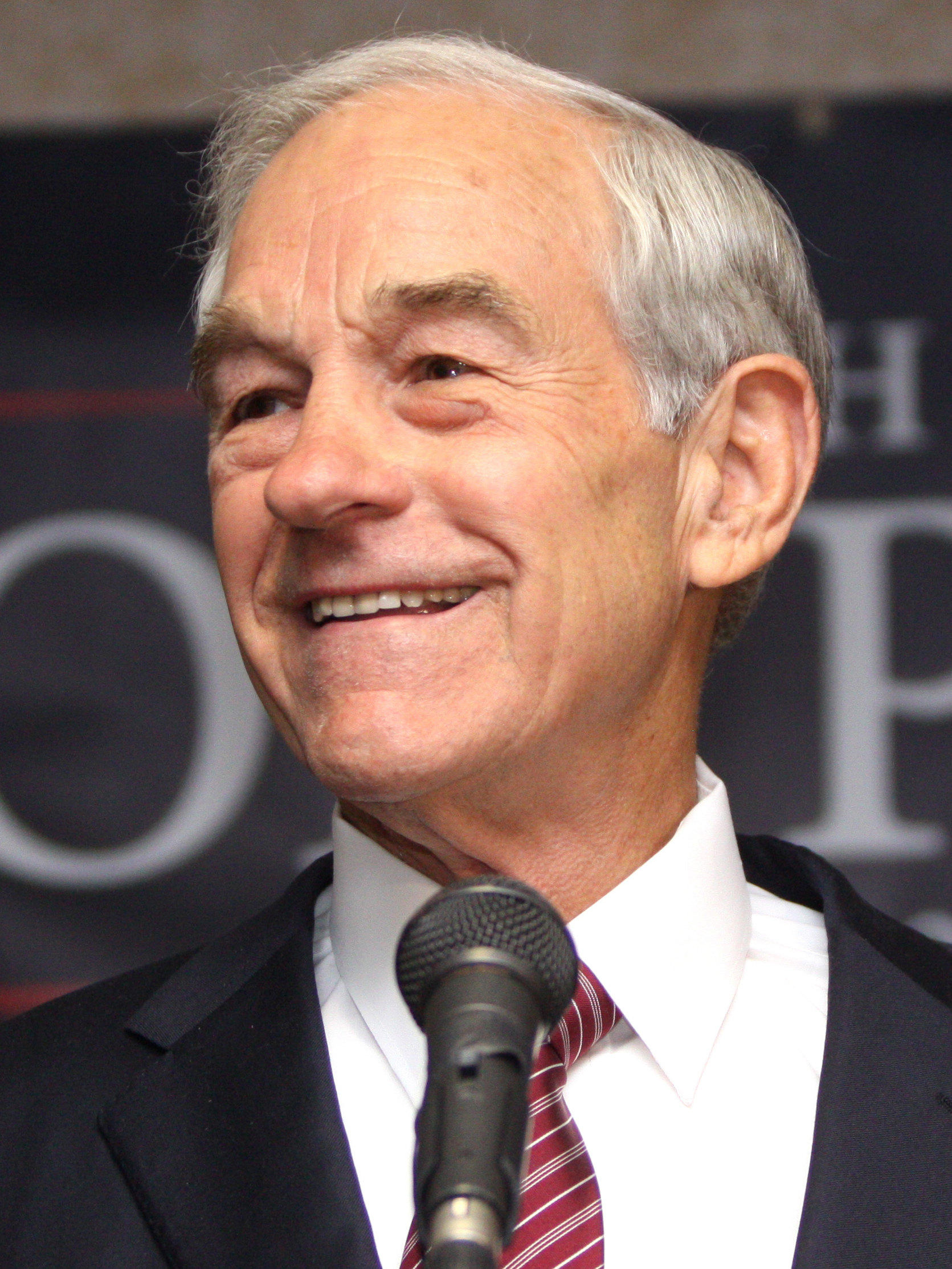
Candidate	Rick Santorum	Mitt Romney
Home state	Pennsylvania	Massachusetts
Delegate count	29	14
Popular vote	205,809	155,630
Percentage	37.11%	28.06%
Candidate	Newt Gingrich	Ron Paul
Home state	Georgia	Texas
Delegate count	9	0
Popular vote	132,889	50,156
Percentage	23.96%	9.04%

Santorum
Romney
Gingrich
Santorum 30 – 40% 40 – 50% 50 – 60%	Romney 30 – 40%	Gingrich 30 – 40%

The Republican primary took place on Super Tuesday, March 6, 2012.

Tennessee has 58 delegates to the 2012 Republican National Convention. Three superdelegates are unbound. 27 delegates are awarded by congressional district, 3 delegates for each district. If a candidate wins two-thirds of the vote in a district, he takes all 3 delegates there; if not, delegates are split 2-to-1 between the top two candidates. Another 28 delegates are awarded to the candidate who wins two-thirds of the vote statewide, or allocated proportionately among candidates winning at least 20% of the vote if no one gets two-thirds.

Former Senator from Pennsylvania Rick Santorum won the primary with a plurality, carrying 37.11% of the vote and all but four counties, awarding him 29 delegates. Former Massachusetts Governor and eventual nominee, Mitt Romney, came second with 28.06% of the vote and 19 delegates. He carried only three counties: Davidson, Loudon, and Williamson. Former Speaker of the House of Representatives, Newt Gingrich of neighboring Georgia, came third with 23.96% of the vote and 9 delegates, carrying only the county of Marion. Representative from Texas Ron Paul received 9.04% of the vote and all other candidates received under 1% of the vote.

==== Results ====
Tennessee Republican primary, 2012
Candidate	Votes	Percentage	Projected delegate count		
Candidate	Votes	Percentage	NYT	CNN	FOX
Rick Santorum	205,809	37.11%	29	27	26
Mitt Romney	155,630	28.06%	14	15	12
Newt Gingrich	132,889	23.96%	9	8	9
Ron Paul	50,156	9.04%	0	0	0
Rick Perry (withdrawn)	1,966	0.35%	0	0	0
Michele Bachmann (withdrawn)	1,895	0.34%	0	0	0
Jon Huntsman (withdrawn)	1,239	0.22%	0	0	0
Buddy Roemer (withdrawn)	881	0.16%	0	0	0
Gary Johnson (withdrawn)	572	0.10%	0	0	0
Uncommitted	3,536	0.64%	0	0	0
Unprojected delegates:			6	8	9
Total:	554,573	100.00%	58	58	58

== General election ==
=== Predictions ===
Source	Ranking	As of
Huffington Post	Safe R	November 6, 2012
CNN	Safe R	November 6, 2012
New York Times	Safe R	November 6, 2012
Washington Post	Safe R	November 6, 2012
RealClearPolitics	Solid R	November 6, 2012
Sabato's Crystal Ball	Solid R	November 5, 2012
FiveThirtyEight	Solid R	November 6, 2012

=== Electoral slates ===
The following individuals were nominated as presidential electors: (Note: Under Tennessee law, only "statewide political parties" (those polling at least 5% in a prior statewide election) are granted automatic ballot access under their party name. All other candidates must qualify as independents by submitting a petition with the required number of signatures from registered voters.)

Mitt Romney and Paul Ryan Republican Party	Barack Obama and Joe Biden Democratic Party	Gary Johnson and James P. Gray Libertarian Party	Jill Stein and Cheri Honkala Green Party
Jennie T. McCabe; David Snodgrass; Scott Niswonger; Joe Bailey; Jerry Sink; Andy Adams; Bob Rial; Ruth Hagerty; Kurt Holbert; Annabel Woodall; Robert Bradley Martin	Chip Forrester; Gale Jones Carson; Bruce Shine; Gloria Johnson; Justin Wilkins; Sandra Perkinson; Jerry Maynard; David Harper; Gerard Stranch; David Johnson; Lois DeBerry	Michael Maness; Jay Polk; Maria C. Mitchell; Gina Chandler; Christopher Blalock; Heather Scott; John T. Polk II; Barry Simmons; James L. Tomasik; Daniel T. Lewis; Steven Rodriguez	Robert Smith; Martin Pleasant; Mike Bascom; Joan Thomas; Elizabeth Dachowski; Danville Sweeton; Katey A. Culver; Edward M. Maclin; Scott Banbury; Howard Switzer; Martin Holsinger
Virgil Goode and Jim Clymer Constitution Party	Rocky Anderson and Luis J. Rodriguez Justice Party	Merlin Miller and Virginia Abernethy American Third Position	
Donald Phillips; Kelleigh Nelson; H. James Headings; Edward Johnson; Brian Webb; David Graves; William Robert Davidson; Charles W. Lewis; James M. Webb; Joseph R. Coffey; Connie Wiggs	Steven Denton; Morna K. Erwin; Amy Clark; Kenneth R. Clark; Kelly L. Groover; Mackenzie Nellis; Barry D. Evans; Jason Moody; James C. Williams; Pamela G. Evans; Jon K. Shell	Susan V. Miller; Thomas H. Pierce; Danielle Kinser; Jim Dooley; C. Gregory Smith; Janiece D. Hamblen; Lisa S. Seals; James Edwards; William A. Rolen; Susan A. Pope Helman; William R. Simms	

=== Results ===
State Senate district results

United States presidential election in Tennessee, 2012
Party	Candidate	Running mate	Votes	Percentage	Electoral votes
Republican	Mitt Romney	Paul Ryan	1,462,330	59.42%	11
Democratic	Barack Obama (incumbent)	Joe Biden (incumbent)	960,709	39.04%	0
Libertarian	Gary Johnson	Jim Gray	18,623	0.67%	0
Green	Jill Stein	Cheri Honkala	6,515	0.26%	0
Constitution	Virgil Goode	Jim Clymer	6,022	0.24%	0
Justice	Rocky Anderson	Luis J. Rodriguez	2,639	0.11%	0
American Third Position	Merlin Miller	Virginia D. Abernethy	1,739	0.07%	0
Totals			2,458,577	100.00%	11

==== By county ====
County	Mitt Romney Republican		Barack Obama Democratic		Various candidates Other parties		Margin		Total
County	#	%	#	%	#	%	#	%	Total
Anderson	18,968	63.95%	10,122	34.13%	569	1.92%	8,846	29.82%	29,659
Bedford	10,034	69.46%	4,211	29.15%	200	1.39%	5,823	40.31%	14,445
Benton	3,850	61.84%	2,258	36.27%	118	1.89%	1,592	25.57%	6,226
Bledsoe	3,022	69.33%	1,267	29.07%	70	1.60%	1,755	40.26%	4,359
Blount	35,441	71.98%	12,934	26.27%	859	1.75%	22,507	45.71%	49,234
Bradley	27,422	75.97%	8,037	22.27%	637	1.76%	19,385	53.70%	36,096
Campbell	8,604	71.10%	3,328	27.50%	169	1.40%	5,276	43.60%	12,101
Cannon	3,309	66.54%	1,564	31.45%	100	2.01%	1,745	35.09%	4,973
Carroll	7,225	66.58%	3,475	32.02%	151	1.40%	3,750	34.56%	10,851
Carter	15,503	75.20%	4,789	23.23%	325	1.57%	10,714	51.97%	20,617
Cheatham	10,268	67.63%	4,659	30.69%	255	1.68%	5,609	36.94%	15,182
Chester	4,684	73.07%	1,624	25.34%	102	1.59%	3,060	47.73%	6,410
Claiborne	7,617	74.84%	2,433	23.90%	128	1.26%	5,184	50.94%	10,178
Clay	1,747	61.95%	1,037	36.77%	36	1.28%	710	25.18%	2,820
Cocke	8,459	73.85%	2,804	24.48%	191	1.67%	5,655	49.37%	11,454
Coffee	13,023	67.62%	5,870	30.48%	366	1.90%	7,153	37.14%	19,259
Crockett	3,783	68.81%	1,669	30.36%	46	0.83%	2,114	38.45%	5,498
Cumberland	18,653	73.73%	6,261	24.75%	384	1.52%	12,392	48.98%	25,298
Davidson	97,622	39.76%	143,120	58.29%	4,792	1.95%	-45,498	-18.53%	245,534
Decatur	2,874	67.61%	1,303	30.65%	74	1.74%	1,571	36.96%	4,251
DeKalb	4,143	64.40%	2,174	33.79%	116	1.81%	1,969	30.61%	6,433
Dickson	11,296	63.34%	6,233	34.95%	306	1.71%	5,063	28.39%	17,835
Dyer	9,921	71.81%	3,757	27.19%	138	1.00%	6,164	44.62%	13,816
Fayette	12,689	64.83%	6,688	34.17%	197	1.00%	6,001	30.66%	19,574
Fentress	5,243	76.04%	1,561	22.64%	91	1.32%	3,682	53.40%	6,895
Franklin	10,262	63.66%	5,603	34.76%	254	1.58%	4,659	28.90%	16,119
Gibson	12,883	65.51%	6,564	33.38%	220	1.11%	6,319	32.13%	19,667
Giles	6,915	64.03%	3,760	34.82%	124	1.15%	3,155	29.21%	10,799
Grainger	5,470	75.43%	1,668	23.00%	114	1.57%	3,802	52.43%	7,252
Greene	17,245	72.19%	6,225	26.06%	417	1.75%	11,020	46.13%	23,887
Grundy	2,516	59.38%	1,643	38.78%	78	1.84%	873	20.60%	4,237
Hamblen	14,522	72.49%	5,234	26.13%	276	1.38%	9,288	46.36%	20,032
Hamilton	79,933	56.39%	58,836	41.51%	2,972	2.10%	21,097	14.88%	141,741
Hancock	1,527	74.63%	475	23.22%	44	2.15%	1,052	51.41%	2,046
Hardeman	4,865	46.60%	5,482	52.51%	92	0.89%	-617	-5.91%	10,439
Hardin	7,886	75.14%	2,467	23.51%	142	1.35%	5,419	51.63%	10,495
Hawkins	14,382	72.50%	5,088	25.65%	367	1.85%	9,294	46.85%	19,837
Haywood	2,960	39.11%	4,569	60.36%	40	0.53%	-1,609	-21.25%	7,569
Henderson	7,421	73.80%	2,517	25.03%	117	1.17%	4,904	48.77%	10,055
Henry	8,193	64.31%	4,339	34.06%	207	1.63%	3,854	30.25%	12,739
Hickman	4,758	62.59%	2,698	35.49%	146	1.92%	2,060	27.10%	7,602
Houston	1,579	52.16%	1,400	46.25%	48	1.59%	179	5.91%	3,027
Humphreys	3,833	55.85%	2,905	42.33%	125	1.82%	928	13.52%	6,863
Jackson	2,383	56.96%	1,739	41.56%	62	1.48%	644	15.40%	4,184
Jefferson	13,038	74.25%	4,232	24.10%	289	1.65%	8,806	50.15%	17,559
Johnson	4,611	74.44%	1,483	23.94%	100	1.62%	3,128	50.50%	6,194
Knox	109,707	63.60%	59,399	34.43%	3,401	1.97%	50,308	29.17%	172,507
Lake	1,163	55.73%	884	42.36%	40	1.91%	279	13.37%	2,087
Lauderdale	4,616	53.12%	4,011	46.16%	62	0.72%	605	6.96%	8,689
Lawrence	10,770	70.77%	4,237	27.84%	212	1.39%	6,533	42.93%	15,219
Lewis	3,117	66.40%	1,447	30.83%	130	2.77%	1,670	35.57%	4,694
Lincoln	9,803	73.88%	3,290	24.80%	175	1.32%	6,513	49.08%	13,268
Loudon	16,707	75.69%	5,058	22.91%	308	1.40%	11,649	52.78%	22,073
Macon	5,260	76.18%	1,552	22.48%	93	1.34%	3,708	53.70%	6,905
Madison	21,993	54.03%	18,367	45.13%	342	0.84%	3,626	8.90%	40,702
Marion	6,272	60.26%	3,953	37.98%	184	1.76%	2,319	22.28%	10,409
Marshall	6,832	63.61%	3,725	34.68%	184	1.71%	3,107	28.93%	10,741
Maury	20,708	62.74%	11,825	35.83%	473	1.43%	8,883	26.91%	33,006
McMinn	12,967	72.71%	4,609	25.84%	258	1.45%	8,358	46.87%	17,834
McNairy	7,015	71.57%	2,645	26.98%	142	1.45%	4,370	44.59%	9,802
Meigs	2,734	68.97%	1,163	29.34%	67	1.69%	1,571	39.63%	3,964
Monroe	11,731	71.80%	4,372	26.76%	235	1.44%	7,359	45.04%	16,338
Montgomery	30,245	54.28%	24,499	43.97%	976	1.75%	5,746	10.31%	55,720
Moore	2,053	73.35%	705	25.19%	41	1.46%	1,348	48.16%	2,799
Morgan	4,669	71.79%	1,725	26.52%	110	1.69%	2,944	45.27%	6,504
Obion	8,814	71.68%	3,321	27.01%	162	1.31%	5,493	44.67%	12,297
Overton	4,775	62.30%	2,805	36.60%	84	1.10%	1,970	25.70%	7,664
Perry	1,578	60.21%	992	37.85%	51	1.94%	586	22.36%	2,621
Pickett	1,712	69.79%	712	29.03%	29	1.18%	1,000	40.76%	2,453
Polk	4,108	67.80%	1,856	30.63%	95	1.57%	2,252	37.17%	6,059
Putnam	17,254	67.66%	7,802	30.60%	444	1.74%	9,452	37.06%	25,500
Rhea	7,802	73.67%	2,628	24.82%	160	1.51%	5,174	48.85%	10,590
Roane	14,724	69.82%	6,018	28.53%	348	1.65%	8,706	41.29%	21,090
Robertson	17,643	67.11%	8,290	31.53%	356	1.36%	9,353	35.58%	26,289
Rutherford	60,846	61.56%	36,414	36.84%	1,588	1.60%	24,432	24.72%	98,848
Scott	5,117	76.74%	1,452	21.78%	99	1.48%	3,665	54.96%	6,668
Sequatchie	3,541	68.72%	1,489	28.90%	123	2.38%	2,052	39.82%	5,153
Sevier	25,984	76.73%	7,418	21.91%	462	1.36%	18,566	54.82%	33,864
Shelby	135,649	36.50%	232,443	62.55%	3,524	0.95%	-96,794	-26.05%	371,616
Smith	4,495	63.41%	2,470	34.84%	124	1.75%	2,025	28.57%	7,089
Stewart	2,963	57.93%	2,069	40.45%	83	1.62%	894	17.48%	5,115
Sullivan	43,562	72.74%	15,321	25.58%	1,004	1.68%	28,241	47.16%	59,887
Sumner	46,003	70.28%	18,579	28.38%	875	1.34%	27,424	41.90%	65,457
Tipton	16,672	69.23%	7,133	29.62%	276	1.15%	9,539	39.61%	24,081
Trousdale	1,612	55.49%	1,240	42.69%	53	1.82%	372	12.80%	2,905
Unicoi	5,032	71.01%	1,913	27.00%	141	1.99%	3,119	44.01%	7,086
Union	4,282	73.35%	1,478	25.32%	78	1.33%	2,804	48.03%	5,838
Van Buren	1,386	60.26%	875	38.04%	39	1.70%	511	22.22%	2,300
Warren	8,010	61.54%	4,752	36.51%	253	1.95%	3,258	25.03%	13,015
Washington	32,808	68.30%	14,325	29.82%	899	1.88%	18,483	38.48%	48,032
Wayne	4,253	77.52%	1,163	21.20%	70	1.28%	3,090	56.32%	5,486
Weakley	8,605	69.75%	3,548	28.76%	184	1.49%	5,057	40.99%	12,337
White	6,197	67.80%	2,795	30.58%	148	1.62%	3,402	37.22%	9,140
Williamson	69,850	72.59%	25,142	26.13%	1,233	1.28%	44,708	46.46%	96,225
Wilson	36,109	69.98%	14,695	28.48%	793	1.54%	21,414	41.50%	51,597
Totals	1,462,330	59.42%	960,709	39.04%	37,865	1.54%	501,621	20.38%	2,460,904

==== Counties that flipped from Democratic to Republican ====
- Houston (largest city: Erin)
- Jackson (largest town: Gainesboro)

==== By congressional district ====
Mitt Romney swept the state and carried seven of the state's nine congressional districts, all represented by Republicans. Barack Obama carried the state's two congressional districts, the 5th and 9th, anchored by the two largest cities of Nashville and Memphis, respectively.

District	Romney	Obama	Representative
1st	72.7%	25.7%	Phil Roe
2nd	67.3%	30.9%	John J. Duncan, Jr.
3rd	63.3%	35.1%	Chuck Fleischmann
4th	65.3%	33.1%	Scott DesJarlais
5th	42.5%	55.9%	Jim Cooper
6th	69.1%	29.5%	Diane Black
7th	65.7%	32.9%	Marsha Blackburn
8th	66.1%	32.8%	Stephen Fincher
9th	20.9%	78.3%	Steve Cohen

== See also ==
- Presidency of Barack Obama
- 2012 Republican Party presidential debates and forums
- 2012 Republican Party presidential primaries
- 2012 Democratic Party presidential primaries
- 2012 Tennessee elections
- 2012 United States elections
