= Houston County, Tennessee =

County in Tennessee, United States

- County
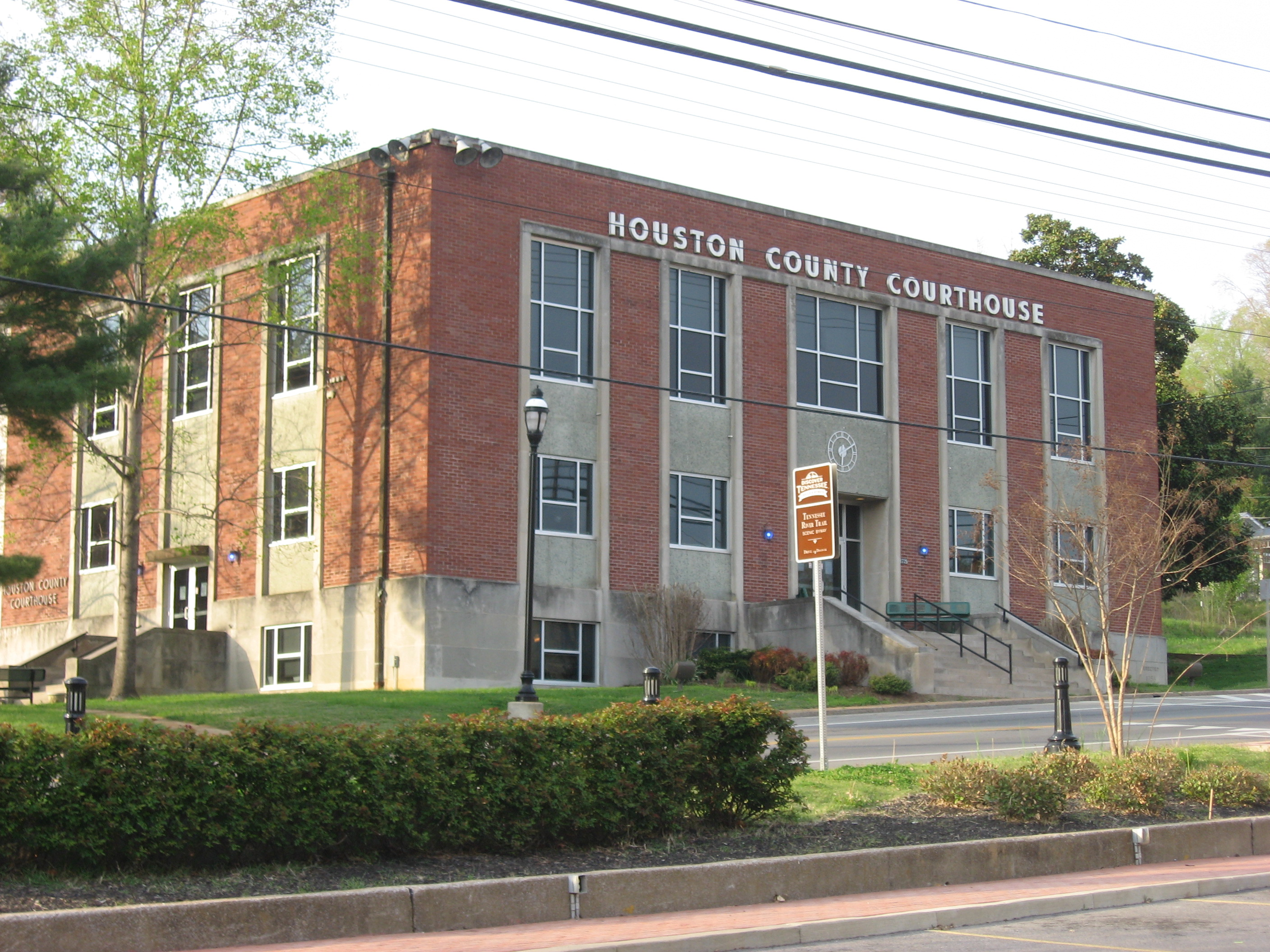
- Houston County Courthouse in April 2014

- Flag Logo

- Location within the U.S. state of Tennessee
- Coordinates: 36°17′N 87°43′W
- Country: United States
- State: Tennessee
- Founded: 1871
- Named for: Sam Houston
- Seat: Erin
- Largest city: Erin

Area
  - Total: 207 sq mi (540 km^{2})
  - Land: 200 sq mi (520 km^{2})
  - Water: 6.7 sq mi (17 km^{2}) 3.2%

Population (2020)
  - Total: 8,283
  - Estimate (2025): 8,479 ▲
  - Density: 42/sq mi (16/km^{2})
- Time zone: UTC−6 (Central)
  - Summer (DST): UTC−5 (CDT)
- Congressional district: 7th
- Website: www.explorehoustoncountytn.com

Houston County is a county located in the U.S. state of Tennessee. As of the 2020 census, the population was 8,283. Its county seat is Erin. The county was founded in 1871. It was named for Sam Houston.

== Geography ==
According to the U.S. Census Bureau, the county has a total area of 207 square miles (540 km^{2}), of which 200 square miles (520 km^{2}) is land and 6.7 square miles (17 km^{2}) (3.2%) is water.

=== Adjacent counties ===
- Stewart County – north
- Montgomery County – northeast
- Dickson County – east
- Humphreys County – south
- Benton County – west

=== Major highways ===
- State Route 13
- State Route 46
- State Route 49
- State Route 147
- State Route 149
- State Route 231
- State Route 232

== Demographics ==
Historical population
Census	Pop.	Note	%±
1880	4,295		—
1890	5,390		25.5%
1900	6,476		20.1%
1910	6,224		−3.9%
1920	6,212		−0.2%
1930	5,555		−10.6%
1940	6,432		15.8%
1950	5,318		−17.3%
1960	4,794		−9.9%
1970	5,845		21.9%
1980	6,871		17.6%
1990	7,018		2.1%
2000	8,088		15.2%
2010	8,426		4.2%
2020	8,283		−1.7%
2025 (est.)	8,479	▲	2.4%
U.S. Decennial Census; 1790-1960 1900-1990; 1990-2000 2010-2020 2020

=== Racial and ethnic composition ===
Houston County, Tennessee – Racial and ethnic composition Note: the US Census treats Hispanic/Latino as an ethnic category. This table excludes Latinos from the racial categories and assigns them to a separate category. Hispanics/Latinos may be of any race.
Race / ethnicity (NH = Non-Hispanic)	Pop 1980	Pop 1990	Pop 2000	Pop 2010	Pop 2020	% 1980	% 1990	% 2000	% 2010	% 2020
White alone (NH)	6,492	6,701	7,611	7,931	7,491	94.48%	95.48%	94.10%	94.13%	90.44%
Black or African American alone (NH)	326	264	266	190	200	4.74%	3.76%	3.29%	2.25%	2.41%
Native American or Alaska Native alone (NH)	5	8	15	20	32	0.07%	0.11%	0.19%	0.24%	0.39%
Asian alone (NH)	3	4	10	25	16	0.04%	0.06%	0.12%	0.30%	0.19%
Native Hawaiian or Pacific Islander alone (NH)	x	x	5	3	8	x	x	0.06%	0.04%	0.10%
Other race alone (NH)	4	0	7	1	40	0.06%	0.00%	0.09%	0.01%	0.48%
Mixed race or Multiracial (NH)	x	x	73	127	294	x	x	0.90%	1.51%	3.55%
Hispanic or Latino (any race)	41	41	101	129	202	0.60%	0.58%	1.25%	1.53%	2.44%
Total	6,871	7,018	8,088	8,426	8,283	100.00%	100.00%	100.00%	100.00%	100.00%

=== 2020 census ===
As of the 2020 census, the county had a population of 8,283 and a median age of 44.3 years. 21.5% of residents were under the age of 18 and 21.6% of residents were 65 years of age or older. For every 100 females there were 99.1 males, and for every 100 females age 18 and over there were 98.4 males age 18 and over.

The racial makeup of the county was 91.2% White, 2.5% Black or African American, 0.6% American Indian and Alaska Native, 0.2% Asian, 0.1% Native Hawaiian and Pacific Islander, 1.1% from some other race, and 4.3% from two or more races. Hispanic or Latino residents of any race comprised 2.4% of the population.

Less than 0.1% of residents lived in urban areas, while 100.0% lived in rural areas.

There were 3,311 households in the county, of which 29.3% had children under the age of 18 living in them. Of all households, 49.7% were married-couple households, 19.4% were households with a male householder and no spouse or partner present, and 24.3% were households with a female householder and no spouse or partner present. About 27.6% of all households were made up of individuals and 13.9% had someone living alone who was 65 years of age or older.

There were 3,936 housing units, of which 15.9% were vacant. Among occupied housing units, 74.7% were owner-occupied and 25.3% were renter-occupied. The homeowner vacancy rate was 1.6% and the rental vacancy rate was 8.4%.

=== 2000 census ===
As of the census of 2000, there were 8,088 people, 3,216 households, and 2,299 families residing in the county. The population density was 40.4 people per square mile (15.6 people/km^{2}). There were 3,901 housing units at an average density of 19.5 per square mile (7.5/km^{2}). The racial makeup of the county was 94.58% White, 3.31% Black or African American, 0.19% Native American, 0.12% Asian, 0.06% Pacific Islander, 0.78% from other races, and 0.95% from two or more races. 1.25% of the population were Hispanic or Latino of any race.

There were 3,216 households, out of which 31.10% had children under the age of 18 living with them, 57.00% were married couples living together, 10.40% had a female householder with no husband present, and 28.50% were non-families. 25.30% of all households were made up of individuals, and 12.10% had someone living alone who was 65 years of age or older. The average household size was 2.46 and the average family size was 2.92.

In the county, the population was spread out, with 24.40% under the age of 18, 7.30% from 18 to 24, 26.10% from 25 to 44, 25.60% from 45 to 64, and 16.70% who were 65 years of age or older. The median age was 40 years. For every 100 females there were 97.80 males. For every 100 females age 18 and over, there were 95.00 males.

The median income for a household in the county was $29,968, and the median income for a family was $35,395. Males had a median income of $29,528 versus $19,983 for females. The per capita income for the county was $15,614. About 14.30% of families and 18.10% of the population were below the poverty line, including 23.20% of those under age 18 and 20.80% of those age 65 or over.

== Government ==
Like many other rural southern and/or Appalachian counties, Houston County was a Democratic stronghold at the presidential level, but due to a combination of factors (such as the party's national shift on social liberalism, a direct contrast to the social conservatism of the region; and a lack of support for workers in these counties, the county (and state as a whole) has sped rapidly toward the Republican Party. The county's last Democratic presidential preference, Obama, won here in 2008, but by a much closer margin than any winning Democrat in recent memory.

United States presidential election results for Houston County, Tennessee
Year	Republican		Democratic		Third party(ies)	
Year	No.	%	No.	%	No.	%
1872	94	17.00%	459	83.00%	0	0.00%
1876	100	16.61%	502	83.39%	0	0.00%
1880	127	19.57%	522	80.43%	0	0.00%
1884	174	21.64%	630	78.36%	0	0.00%
1888	259	25.69%	745	73.91%	4	0.40%
1892	206	20.48%	704	69.98%	96	9.54%
1896	343	26.86%	896	70.16%	38	2.98%
1900	341	30.89%	738	66.85%	25	2.26%
1904	287	32.00%	555	61.87%	55	6.13%
1908	288	29.45%	665	68.00%	25	2.56%
1912	172	18.92%	586	64.47%	151	16.61%
1916	207	23.60%	627	71.49%	43	4.90%
1920	385	32.27%	790	66.22%	18	1.51%
1924	97	16.84%	444	77.08%	35	6.08%
1928	374	59.18%	258	40.82%	0	0.00%
1932	112	12.92%	750	86.51%	5	0.58%
1936	193	19.18%	813	80.82%	0	0.00%
1940	229	17.21%	1,093	82.12%	9	0.68%
1944	248	20.26%	976	79.74%	0	0.00%
1948	202	13.88%	1,159	79.66%	94	6.46%
1952	465	27.45%	1,229	72.55%	0	0.00%
1956	340	24.55%	1,033	74.58%	12	0.87%
1960	366	23.87%	1,150	75.02%	17	1.11%
1964	287	15.44%	1,572	84.56%	0	0.00%
1968	232	12.82%	636	35.16%	941	52.02%
1972	800	46.38%	870	50.43%	55	3.19%
1976	407	16.77%	1,990	81.99%	30	1.24%
1980	738	29.04%	1,757	69.15%	46	1.81%
1984	882	33.68%	1,716	65.52%	21	0.80%
1988	882	37.26%	1,467	61.98%	18	0.76%
1992	648	21.96%	2,012	68.18%	291	9.86%
1996	742	26.34%	1,868	66.31%	207	7.35%
2000	993	31.76%	2,081	66.55%	53	1.69%
2004	1,440	40.02%	2,126	59.09%	32	0.89%
2008	1,608	47.94%	1,678	50.03%	68	2.03%
2012	1,579	52.16%	1,400	46.25%	48	1.59%
2016	2,182	68.88%	866	27.34%	120	3.79%
2020	2,718	73.74%	871	23.63%	97	2.63%
2024	2,989	78.45%	773	20.29%	48	1.26%

The Board of Commissioners meets at the Houston County Courthouse the third Monday of odd months (January, March, May, July, September, November).

=== Elected officials ===
- County Mayor: Joey Brake
- County Clerk: Robert Brown
- Administrator of Elections: Annette Pulley
- Property Assessor: Joy Hooper
- Register of Deeds: Linda Lamberth
- County Trustee: Jimmy Lowery
- County Highway Department Superintendent: Teresa Alsobrooks
- County Circuit Court Clerk: Donna Potts Vincent
- General Sessions & Juvenile Judge: W. Sidney Vinson
- Sheriff: Kevin L. Sugg

=== Commissioners ===
- District 1: William C. Agy and Ann Fielder
- District 2: Randall French and J. Steve Hall
- District 3: Glen Baggett and Danny Warren
- District 4: Charles Darrell Kingsmill and Howard Spurgeon
- District 5: Lance Uffelman and Vickie Reedy
- District 6: Joey Brake and Chris Pitts
- District 7: Brant Lamastus and Tony Hayes

=== Politics ===
Houston County was historically one of the state's most Democratic counties, however, like other socially conservative rural counties, it has trended hard right in recent years. Formerly a part of Tennessee's 8th congressional district, which was represented by Blue Dog Democrat John Tanner, Houston County is now part of Tennessee's 7th congressional district and is represented by Republican Matt Van Epps.

The county was formerly among the most consistently Democratic in the state on presidential elections. Democratic candidates failed to carry Houston County at the presidential level only twice prior to 2012. In 1928, Herbert Hoover became the first Republican presidential candidate to ever carry Houston County, due to anti-Catholic voting against Al Smith in this "Bible Belt" region. The second non-Democrat to carry Houston County was George Wallace of the American Independent Party during the 1968 presidential election, following which Houston County became one of only six Wallace counties to vote for George McGovern against Richard Nixon's 3,000-plus-county landslide of 1972. (Note: The others were the fellow secessionist white-majority Middle Tennessee counties of Perry and Stewart, plus the three Alabama Black Belt counties of Bullock, Lowndes and Wilcox where Negro voter registration was severely delayed after the Voting Rights Act.)

In the 2008 presidential election, when most other traditionally Democratic counties in the state voted for John McCain, Houston County supported Barack Obama. However, the county's vote has been shifting Republican as reflected by Barack Obama's winning margin of barely more than 2%, the lowest margin among all Democratic presidential candidates who have carried Houston County since its creation. In the 2012 presidential election, Mitt Romney became the first Republican in 80 years to win the county. Republican Senator Bob Corker and Republican Representative Marsha Blackburn also won the county.

In 2016, the county swung hard to the right, with Republican Donald Trump winning it by more than 40 percentage points, a massive shift from Romney's margin of less than 6 points. As such, the county has become substantially more Republican than the state as a whole, voting similarly to the rock-ribbed Republican counties of East Tennessee.

== Education ==
=== Public high schools ===
- Houston County High School – (students: 465; location: 2500 State Route 149; grades: 9–12)
- Houston County Adult High School – (students: 2; location: 3573 West Main Street; grades: 11–12)

=== Public primary/middle schools ===
- Erin Elementary School – (students: 456; location: 6500 State Route 13; grades: K–5)
- Tennessee Ridge Elementary School – (students: 280; location: 135 School Street; grades: K–5)
- Houston County Middle School – (students: 338; location: 1241 West Main Street; grades: 6–8)

== Media ==
- FM radio: WTPR-FM 101.7 "The Greatest Hits of All Time"
- Weekly newspaper: Houston County Herald
- Television station: Wells Creek Basin Network

== Communities ==
=== City ===
- Erin (county seat)

=== Town ===
- Tennessee Ridge (small part in Stewart County)

=== Unincorporated communities ===
- McKinnon
- Stewart

== See also ==
- National Register of Historic Places listings in Houston County, Tennessee
