= Tennessee State Route 236 =

State highway in Tennessee, United States

State Route 236
- Tiny Town Road
- SR 236 highlighted in red

Route information
- Maintained by TDOT
- Length: 6.85 mi (11.02 km)
- Existed: July 1, 1983–present

Major junctions
- West end: US 41A in Clarksville
- East end: SR 48 in Clarksville

Location
- Country: United States
- State: Tennessee
- Counties: Montgomery

Highway system
- Tennessee State Routes; Interstate; US; State
← SR 235	→ SR 237

State Route 236 (SR 236), known locally as Tiny Town Road, is an east–west secondary state highway located entirely in Montgomery County in Middle Tennessee. It was designated as Dr. Martin Luther King Jr. Boulevard on June 15, 1999 in House Joint Resolution 241

== Route description ==
SR 236 connects US 41A (Fort Campbell Boulevard) with SR 48 (Trenton Road) on the north side of Clarksville.

The route also has an intersection with Pembroke Road, which connects SR 236 with Kentucky Route 115 at the state line.

SR 236 also passes by the Clarksville-Montgomery County Regional Airport near its western end.

== Major intersections ==
The entire route is in Clarksville, Montgomery County.

mi	km	Destinations	Notes
0.00	0.00	US 41A (SR 12/Fort Campbell Boulevard) to I-24 – Clarksville, Oak Grove, KY, Hopkinsville, KY	Western terminus
1.10	1.77	Pembroke Road to KY 115 north – Pembroke	Connects with the southern end of KY 115 at the Kentucky state line
6.85	11.02	SR 48 (Trenton Road) to I-24 – Clarksville, Trenton, KY	Eastern terminus
1.000 mi = 1.609 km; 1.000 km = 0.621 mi
