= Daryl Mosley =

American singer, musician, and songwriter

- Born: September 21, 1964 (age 62); Waverly, Tennessee
- Occupation: Musician

Daryl Mosley (born September 21, 1964) is an American singer, musician, and songwriter. He is a four-time Songwriter of the Year with twenty #1 songs and three Song of the Year awards to his credit. Among them is the classic "(Ask the Blind Man) He Saw It All", the signature song of the southern gospel trio the Booth Brothers.

== Early life ==
Mosley was born in Waverly, Tennessee, into a musical family. At the age of 15, Mosley began singing and entertaining at Loretta Lynn's Dude Ranch in Hurricane Mills, Tennessee.

== Bluegrass music ==
In 1987, Mosley met banjo player Richie Dotson in Dickson, Tennessee. Dotson introduced Mosley to mandolin player Danny Roberts and guitarist Fred Duggin and the foursome formed the band New Tradition. In 1991, New Tradition won the national bluegrass band contest sponsored by SPBGMA, the Society for the Preservation of Bluegrass Music in America. This led to the band signing with Brentwood Music, with whom the band recorded several albums. The first, Bluegrass Gospel At Its Finest, was a hymns album. The band's second album, Seed of Love, featured a number of songs penned by Mosley including the title cut, "With His Hands In Wood", and "On His Knees". The albums Closer Than It's Ever Been and Love Here Today followed. Fred Duggin left the band and was replaced by Ken White and then later by Jamie Clifton. Richie Dotson left the band and was replaced by Aaron McDaris.

Mosley and New Tradition moved on to record two albums with Pinecastle Records, Daddy, On His Knees and A Piece At A Time, and one album with Mountain Home Records, Stand And Be Counted, before Mosley left the band in 1999.

== Osborne Brothers ==
In 2001, Mosley joined the legendary group The Osborne Brothers to replace the departing bass player/singer Terry Smith. Mosley worked with The Osborne Brothers until Sonny's retirement in 2003, and then with Bobby Osborne and his band, the Rocky Top Express, until 2011.

== The Farm Hands ==
In 2011, Mosley left Bobby Osborne's band and organized a new quartet, The Farm Hands. The band included Tim Graves on resophonic guitar, Bennie Boling on banjo and Kevin Williamson on guitar. In 2013, Williamson left and was replaced by guitarist Keith Tew and later, Boling left and was replaced by Don Hill. The band toured over 150 concerts a year and were widely celebrated for their entertaining stage show and original music.

== Solo Work ==
In 2019, Mosley signed a recording contract with Pinecastle Records. His first solo album titled "The Secret of Life" (co-produced by New Tradition alum Danny Roberts) was released in May 2020. Both the singles "A Few Years Ago" (Roots Music Report, September 2020) and "Do What The Good Book Says," (Bluegrass Jamboree, November 2020) topped the charts as well as the album reaching #1 on several charts including the Roots Music Report. Mosley and the album were highly praised in publications American Songwriter magazine, No Depression magazine and others.

In 2022, Mosley released the critically acclaimed album, "Small Town Dreamer" on Pinecastle Records. The album featured three #1 songs; "Transistor Radio" (Bluegrass Unlimited, May 2022), "Mama's Bible" (Bluegrass Today, February 2023) and "He's With Me" (Cashbox Magazine, October 2023). In 2023, Mosley released his third album, "A Life Well Lived" on Pinecastle Records. The album features three #1 songs: "Big God" (Real Southern Gospel Chart, April 2023), "The Bible In The Drawer" (Real Southern Gospel Chart, October 2023) and "Mayberry State of Mind" (Roots Music Report, June 2024).

In 2024, Mosley released "Long Days & Short Stories," his fourth solo album for Pinecastle Records. It featured the number one songs, "When The Good Old Days Were New" (Banjo Radio, August 2024), "Me & Mr. Howard," (Banjo Radio, January 2025) and "When I Can't Reach Up," (Real Southern Gospel, May 2025). Daryl also recorded the duet "Everyday Blessings" with Jaelee Roberts. The song, featured on Rick Lang's "Blue Collar Gospel" album topped the charts in March of 2025 (Real Southern Gospel) as well as making the nominee list for the Gospel Music Association's Dove Awards.

== Songwriting ==
A number of artists have recorded songs written by Mosley. In addition to the songs Mosley wrote for New Tradition and The Farm Hands, he has had songs recorded by The Grascals, Bobby Osborne, Christian artists High Road, The King James Boys, Marty Raybon, country artist Lynn Anderson, and others. In 2005, southern gospel trio The Booth Brothers recorded "(Ask The Blind Man) He Saw It All". The song quickly became the trio's signature song. It was their first number one song and was named by the Singing News Magazine as one of the top Southern Gospel songs of all time. .A feature article about Mosley and his songwriting was featured in the April 2017 issue of Bluegrass Unlimited magazine and another in the February 2021 issue. Mosley and his 2020 solo album "The Secret of Life" were highly praised in publications American Songwriter magazine, No Depression magazine and others.

== Awards ==
In 1989 Mosley, as part of New Tradition, was named Bluegrass Gospel Group of the Year by SPBGMA.

In 2006, Mosley's song "(Ask the Blind Man) He Saw It All" was named Song of the Year at the Singing News Fan Awards, the sogospelnews Awards, and the Southern Gospel Music Guild.

In 2014 Mosley, as part of The Farm Hands album "In A Country Town", was named Album of the Year by SPBGMA.

In 2015 The Farm Hands were named Entertaining Band of The Year and Bluegrass Gospel Band of the Year by SPBGMA.

In 2016 The Farm Hands were named Vocal Group of the Year and Bluegrass Gospel Band of the Year by SPBGMA. In 2016 Mosley was named Songwriter of the Year by SPBGMA.

In 2017, The Farm Hands were named Entertainers of the Year, Gospel Band of the Year, as well as winning Song of the Year and Album of the Year for "Dig In The Dirt". In 2017, Mosley was named Bluegrass Songwriter of the Year.

In 2018, SPBGMA named The Farm Hands Band of the Year. Their Pinecastle album, "Colors" was named Album of the Year, and their song, "Rural Route" was named Song of the Year. http://pinecastlemusic.com/the-farm-hands-win-big-at-spbgma-2018/

In 2019, Mosley's song "Hillbilly Graham" was named Song of the Year by the SPBGMA

In February 2023, Mosley was named Songwriter of the Year for the third time by the Society for the Preservation of Bluegrass Music in America. He received the award again in January 2025. It was his fourth win.
