= Stewart, Tennessee =

- Unincorporated community
- Location within Tennessee Location within the United States
- Coordinates: 36°19′14″N 87°50′29″W
- Country: United States
- State: Tennessee
- County: Houston
- Elevation: 489 ft (149 m)
- Time zone: UTC-6 (Central (CST))
  - Summer (DST): UTC-5 (CDT)
- ZIP code: 37175
- Area code: 931
- GNIS feature ID: 1303829

Stewart is an unincorporated community in Houston County, Tennessee, United States. Its ZIP code is 37175.
