= Kentucky Route 115 =

State highway in Kentucky, United States

Kentucky Route 115

Route information
- Maintained by KYTC
- Length: 16.724 mi (26.915 km)
- Existed: 1929–present

Major junctions
- South end: Pembroke Road (to SR 236) at the Kentucky–Tennessee state line
- I-24 in Oak Grove; US 41 in Pembroke
- North end: US 68 Alt. at Fairview

Location
- Country: United States
- State: Kentucky
- Counties: Christian, Todd

Highway system
- Kentucky State Highway System; Interstate; US; State; Parkways
← KY 114	→ KY 116

Kentucky Route 115 (KY 115) is a 16.724-mile-long (26.915 km) state highway in Kentucky. It runs from Pembroke Road at the Tennessee–Kentucky state line in Oak Grove to U.S. Route 68 Alt. at Fairvew via Pembroke.

== Route description ==
A locally maintained road in Montgomery County, Tennessee, becomes KY 115 at the Kentucky–Tennessee state line at Oak Grove. It has a junction with Interstate 24 (I-24) at exit 89 just north of Oak Grove, and then intersects KY 109 just north of that interchange.

It crosses US 41 at Pembroke, and continues northeast to terminate at a junction with U.S. Route 68 Alt. right on the Todd County line in the shadow of the Jefferson Davis Monument.

== Major intersections ==
County	Location	mi	km	Destinations	Notes
Christian	Oak Grove	0.000	0.000	Pembroke Road	Southern terminus; Kentucky–Tennessee state line; to SR 236
Christian	Oak Grove	0.225	0.362	KY 400 west (State Line Road)	Eastern terminus of KY 400
Christian	Oak Grove	1.239	1.994	KY 911 west (Thompsonville Lane) / Hugh Hunter Road	Eastern terminus of KY 911
Christian	Oak Grove	2.877	4.630	I-24 – Nashville, St. Louis	I-24 exit 89
Christian		4.173	6.716	KY 109 west / KY 1453 west (Bradshaw Road)	South end of KY 1453 overlap; eastern terminus of KY 109
Christian		4.515	7.266	KY 1453 east (Barkers Mill Road)	North end of KY 1453 overlap
Christian		9.375	15.088	KY 1027 west (Long Pond Road)	South end of KY 1027 overlap
Christian	Pembroke	10.662	17.159	US 41 (Nashville Street)	
Christian	Pembroke	10.995	17.695	KY 1027 east (Rosetown Road)	North end of KY 1027 overlap
Christian	Fairview	16.724	26.915	US 68 Alt. (Jefferson Davis Road)	Northern terminus
Christian	1.000 mi = 1.609 km; 1.000 km = 0.621 mi				
