= Houston County High School (Tennessee) =

Location
- 2500 Highway 149; Erin, Tennessee; United States; 36°18′56″N 87°43′03″W

Information
- Type: Public
- NCES School ID: 470192001441
- Principal: Josh Rutherford
- Teaching staff: 27.33 (on FTE basis)
- Grades: 9 to 12
- Enrollment: 360 (2023–2024)
- Student to teacher ratio: 13.17
- Colors: Kelly Green and White
- Mascot: Leprechaun
- Nickname: Lucky
- Website: https://hchs.houston.k12.tn.us/

Houston County High School (Tennessee), a.k.a. HCHS, is located just outside the county seat of Erin, Tennessee. It is one of four schools in the Houston County public school system and the only high school (grades 9–12).

HCHS's nickname is the Fighting Irish due to the areas rich Irish heritage. School colors are Kelly Green and White.

Athletics include Marching Band, Basketball, Football, Baseball, Softball, Cheerleading, Tennis, Golf & Volleyball (girls).
