= Fairview, Wayne County, Tennessee =

Fairview, Tennessee
- Unincorporated community
- Location within Tennessee
- Coordinates: 35°02′39″N 87°40′33″W
- Country: United States
- State: Tennessee
- County: Wayne
- Elevation: 820 ft (250 m)
- Time zone: Central (CST)
  - Summer (DST): CDT
- Area code: 931

Fairview is an unincorporated community in Wayne County, Tennessee, United States.
