= Indian Mound, Tennessee =

- Unincorporated community
- Location within Tennessee Location within the United States
- Coordinates: 36°30′03″N 87°41′37″W
- Country: United States
- State: Tennessee
- County: Stewart
- Elevation: 377 ft (115 m)
- Time zone: UTC-6 (Central (CST))
  - Summer (DST): UTC-5 (CDT)
- ZIP code: 37079
- Area code: 931
- GNIS feature ID: 1306608

Indian Mound is an unincorporated community in Stewart County, Tennessee, United States. It has a post office, with ZIP code 37079.

Cross Creek Baptist Church is located in Indian Mound at 882 Red Top Road. It has been in existence since 1851 and incurred substantial damage in a tornado that occurred on December 9, 2023. Pleasant Grove Baptist Church is located in Indian Mound at 2904 Highway 79. It has been in existence since 1919.
