= Waverly, Tennessee =

- City
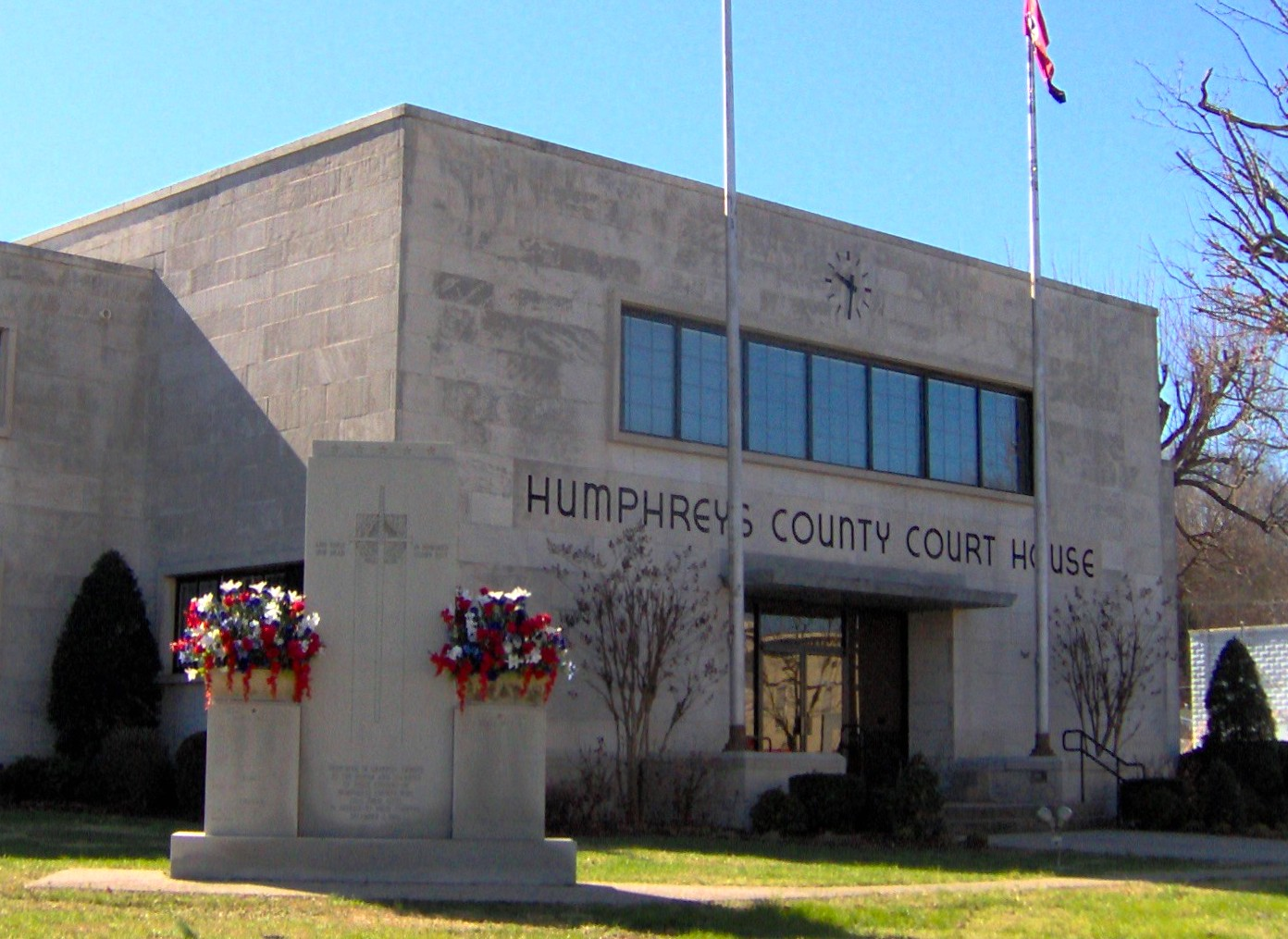
- Humphreys County Courthouse in Waverly

- Location of Waverly in Humphreys County, Tennessee.
- Coordinates: 36°5′9″N 87°47′13″W
- Country: United States
- State: Tennessee
- County: Humphreys
- Incorporated: 1838
- Named for: Waverley Novels of Sir Walter Scott

Area
  - Total: 8.71 sq mi (22.57 km^{2})
  - Land: 8.71 sq mi (22.57 km^{2})
  - Water: 0 sq mi (0.00 km^{2})
- Elevation: 535 ft (163 m)

Population (2020)
  - Total: 4,297
  - Density: 493/sq mi (190.4/km^{2})
- Time zone: UTC-6 (Central (CST))
  - Summer (DST): UTC-5 (CDT)
- ZIP code: 37185
- Area code: 931
- FIPS code: 47-78560
- GNIS feature ID: 1273950
- Website: waverlytn.org

Waverly is a city in and the county seat of Humphreys County, Tennessee, United States. The population was 4,297 at the 2020 census.

== History ==
Waverly was established by Steven Pavatt as a stop along the stagecoach road between Nashville and Memphis in the early 19th century. Pavatt was a fan of the author Sir Walter Scott, and named the community after Scott's Waverley Novels. When Humphreys County was created in 1803, Reynoldsburg, located northwest of Waverly along the Tennessee River, was chosen as the county seat. However, when county lands on the west bank of the Tennessee split off to become part of the newly created Benton County in 1835, the Humphreys County seat was moved to Waverly, which had become the more central location in the county. A courthouse was built in 1836, and the town was officially incorporated in 1838.

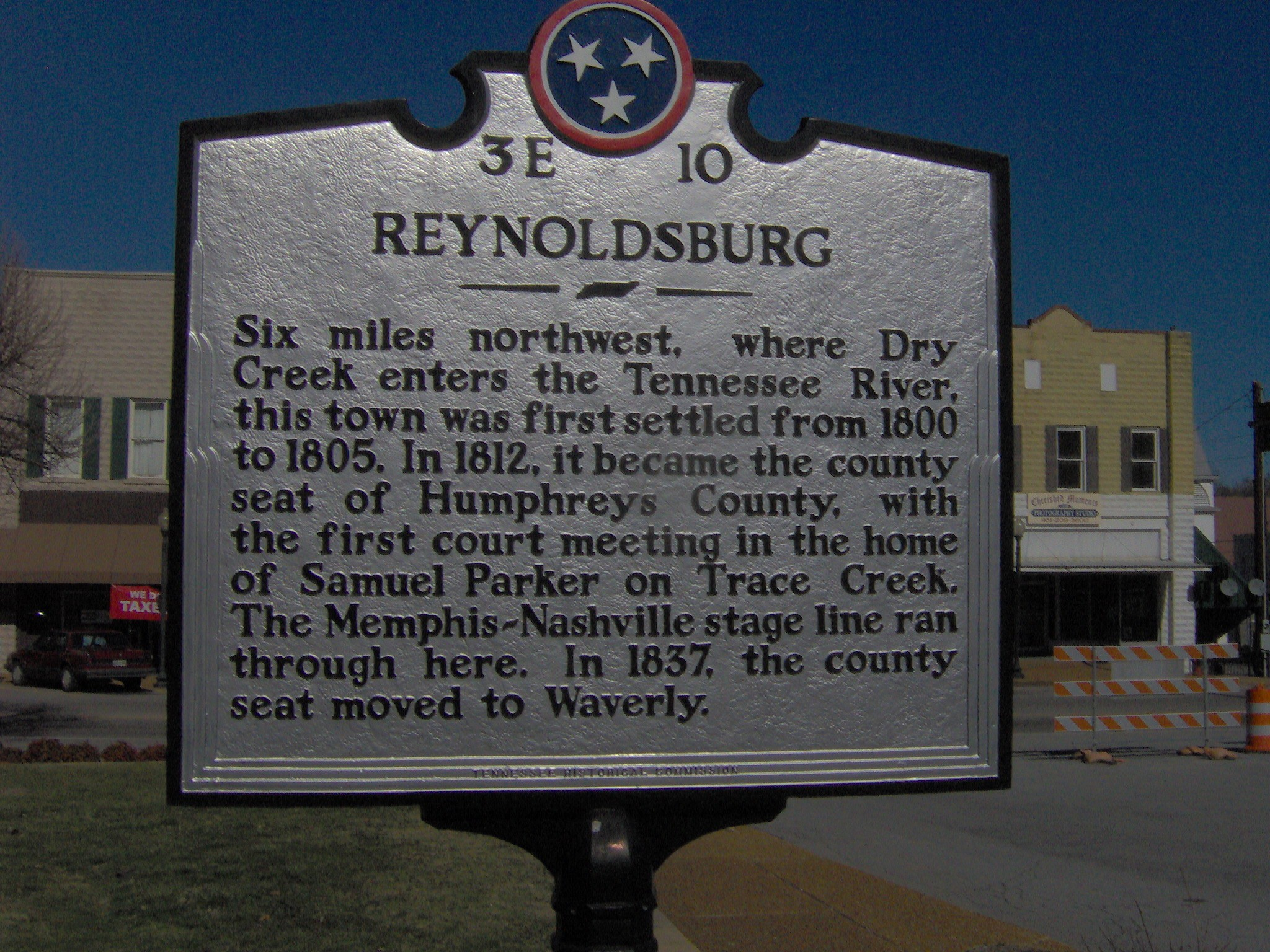
THC marker in Waverly recalling the now-defunct town of Reynoldsburg

Like most of Middle and West Tennessee, Waverly was staunchly pro-Confederacy during the American Civil War. Humphreys County voted unanimously in favor of secession in 1861. Union troops occupied the town in 1863 to guard the railroad between White Bluff and Johnsonville (now Old Johnsonville), the latter being a Federal supply depot and transfer station. The Union troops managed to build a fort at the courthouse square, although they were constantly harassed by Confederate guerillas. On November 4, 1864, Confederate troops under Nathan Bedford Forrest attacked and destroyed the Federal depot in what became known as the Battle of Johnsonville. The battle occurred approximately 10 miles (16 km) west of Waverly at the mouth of Trace Creek.

Hurricane Mills, located a few miles south of Waverly along TN-13, was the site of a substantial mill and carding factory in the late 19th and early 20th centuries. A Mississippian-era prehistoric village (known as the Duck River Temple Mounds or Link Farm Site) and a farm owned by Jesse James were both located near the Link farm site in the vicinity of Hurricane Mills.

On February 24, 1978, a propane tank car explosion occurred in downtown Waverly after an L&N train derailed. The explosion, which killed 16 people, led to an overhaul of the methods used by the Tennessee Emergency Management Agency when responding to hazardous material spills. It also led to various strengthened standards and regulations (e.g., for design and construction of rail cars) by the National Transportation Safety Board.

During the morning of August 21, 2021, very heavy rainfall and totals of over 17 inches (43 cm) caused Trace Creek to overflow in the middle of town, leading to catastrophic flooding in Waverly. Floodwaters impacted many homes and businesses, electric, telephone, and water services, churches, and Waverly Elementary School. Many structures were flooded with up to 4 feet (1.2 m) of water, with numerous homes washed completely off their foundations. All roads in and out of town were made impassable, and 20 people were killed in Humphreys County.

On October 10, 2025, an explosion at a manufacturing plant, killed 16 and injured 7. Investigations revealed the explosion came from a chain reaction.

The community faced tragedy again on January 2, 2026, when the bodies of four people were found dead in a home that occurred on the same street as the flood. It was revealed a woman had shot and killed her two children and her grandmother before killing herself. The community came together to honor the victims.

== Geography ==
Waverly is located at 36°5′9″N 87°47′13″W (36.085847, −87.786917). The city is situated in the Trace Creek Valley, just over 10 miles (16 km) east of the creek's confluence with the Kentucky Lake impoundment of the Tennessee River. The low ridges that "wall in" Waverly to the north and south represent the fringe of the western section of the Highland Rim.

Waverly is centered on the junction of U.S. Route 70, which connects the city to Nashville to the east and Memphis to the west, and State Route 13, which connects the city to Hurricane Mills and Interstate 40 to the south and the rural areas around Erin to the north.

According to the United States Census Bureau, the city has a total area of 8.1 square miles (21 km^{2}), all of it land.

== Demographics ==
Historical population
Census	Pop.	Note	%±
1850	174		—
1860	288		65.5%
1870	207		−28.1%
1880	510		146.4%
1900	786		—
1910	947		20.5%
1920	1,054		11.3%
1930	1,152		9.3%
1940	1,318		14.4%
1950	1,892		43.6%
1960	2,891		52.8%
1970	3,794		31.2%
1980	4,405		16.1%
1990	3,925		−10.9%
2000	4,028		2.6%
2010	4,105		1.9%
2020	4,297		4.7%

=== 2020 census ===
As of the 2020 census, Waverly had a population of 4,297, along with 1,743 households and 939 families. The median age was 40.8 years; 22.6% of residents were under the age of 18 and 20.7% were 65 years of age or older. For every 100 females there were 92.6 males, and for every 100 females age 18 and over there were 86.8 males age 18 and over.

There were 1,743 households in Waverly, of which 30.6% had children under the age of 18 living in them. Of all households, 39.9% were married-couple households, 18.7% were households with a male householder and no spouse or partner present, and 33.4% were households with a female householder and no spouse or partner present. About 30.8% of all households were made up of individuals and 15.5% had someone living alone who was 65 years of age or older.

There were 1,915 housing units, of which 9.0% were vacant. The homeowner vacancy rate was 0.8% and the rental vacancy rate was 5.8%.

0.0% of residents lived in urban areas, while 100.0% lived in rural areas.

Racial composition as of the 2020 census
Race	Number	Percent
White	3,718	86.5%
Black or African American	284	6.6%
American Indian and Alaska Native	12	0.3%
Asian	23	0.5%
Native Hawaiian and Other Pacific Islander	0	0.0%
Some other race	42	1.0%
Two or more races	218	5.1%
Hispanic or Latino (of any race)	144	3.4%

=== 2010 census ===
As of the 2010 census, there were 4,105 people with a population density of 468 inhabitants per square mile (181/km^{2}). There were 1,877 housing units at an average density of 214 per square mile (83/km^{2}).

=== 2000 census ===
As of the 2000 census, the racial makeup of the city was 88.75% White, 9.51% African American, 0.15% Native American, 0.22% Asian, 0.37% from other races, and 0.99% from two or more races. 1.17% of the population is Hispanic or Latino of any race.

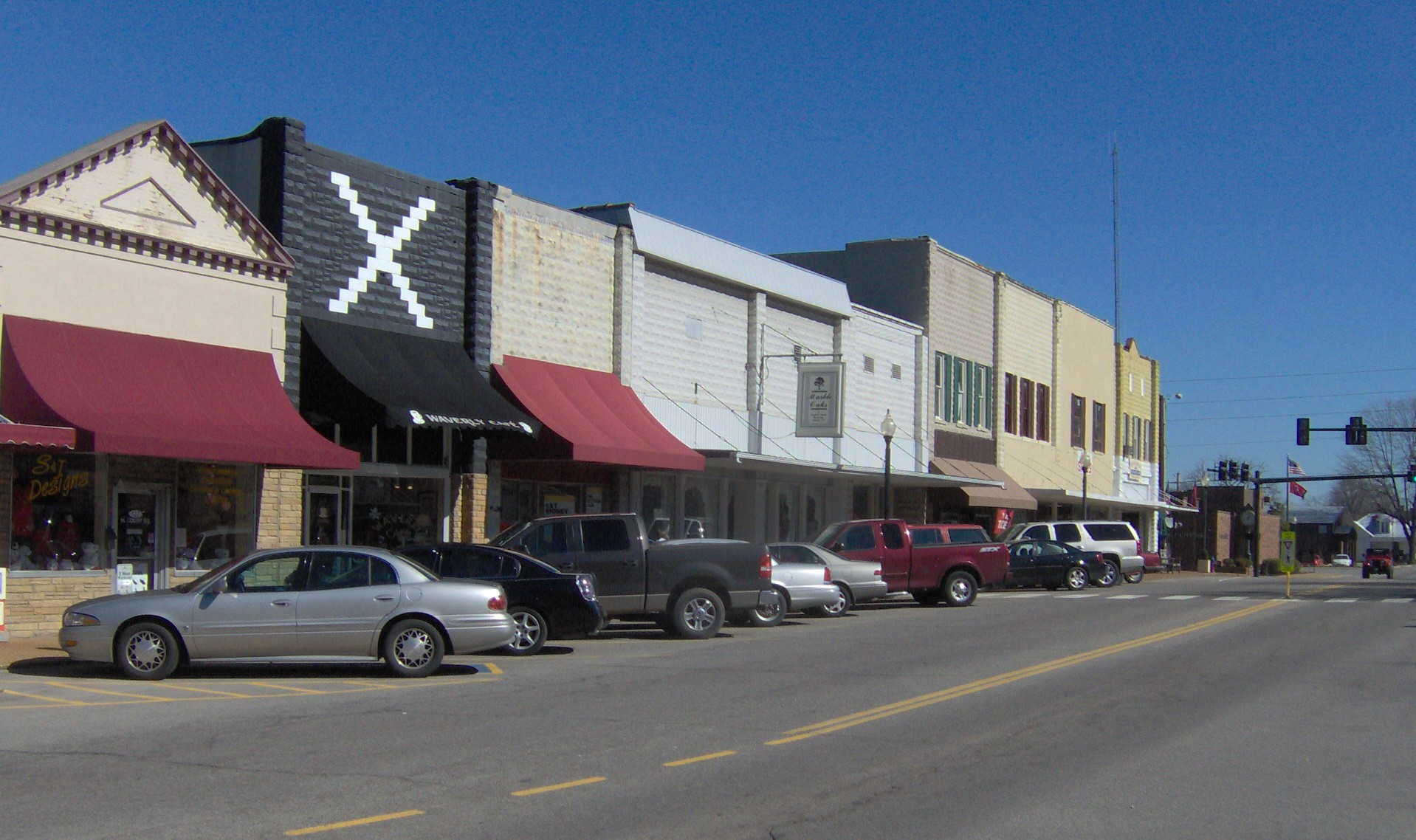
North Court Square in Waverly

There were 1,716 households, out of which 27.6% had children under the age of 18 living with them, 47.7% were married couples living together, 14.6% had a female householder with no husband present, and 34.8% were non-families. 31.4% of all households were made up of individuals, and 15.0% had someone living alone who was 65 years of age or older. The average household size was 2.27 and the average family size was 2.81.

In the city the population was spread out, with 22.2% under the age of 18, 7.5% from 18 to 24, 26.7% from 25 to 44, 24.4% from 45 to 64, and 19.2% who were 65 years of age or older. The median age was 40 years. For every 100 females, there were 89.7 males. For every 100 females age 18 and over, there were 84.5 males.

The median income for a household in the city was $32,614, and the median income for a family was $44,375. Males had a median income of $30,610 versus $19,297 for females. The per capita income for the city was $18,139. About 10.9% of families and 15.7% of the population were below the poverty line, including 21.0% of those under age 18 and 15.1% of those age 65 or over.

== Notable residents ==
- Deborah Adams, author
- Murray Bowen, psychiatrist and professor
- Susan Goodman, 1983 Mrs. America
- George Morgan, country music singer
- Daryl Mosley, singer, musician, and songwriter.
