= Palmyra, Tennessee =

Unincorporated community in Tennessee, US

- Unincorporated community
- Location within Tennessee Location within the United States
- Coordinates: 36°26′15″N 87°29′08″W
- Country: United States
- State: Tennessee
- County: Montgomery
- Time zone: UTC-6 (Central (CST))
  - Summer (DST): UTC-5 (CDT)
- ZIP code: 37142
- Area code: 931

Palmyra is an unincorporated community in Montgomery County, Tennessee. It is located along State Route 149, southwest of Clarksville. The town had its own post office until around 2010 when the post office was closed and mail service began to be handled out of nearby Clarksville. The zip code for Palmyra is 37142. The community is part of the Clarksville, TN–KY Metropolitan Statistical Area.

Palmyra was laid out by Morgan Brown and established by the legislature in 1796. Brown had the town designated as a port of entry in 1797, and it was the only port of entry in the west until Cincinnati two years later.

Palmyra has a rich Civil War history with Major General Joseph Wheeler of the Confederate army took position on the Cumberland River in late January 1863. His plan was to disrupt Union ships going to Fort Donelson at Dover, a few miles west of Palmyra. Aware of Wheeler's intentions, the Union did not send any ships up or down the river, forcing Wheeler to attack Fort Donelson with his cavalry division. Wheeler was unable to take Fort Donelson and had to retreat after sustaining heavy losses.

== Notable natives ==
- Enoch Tanner Wickham, folk artist
