= Cumberland City, Tennessee =

- Town
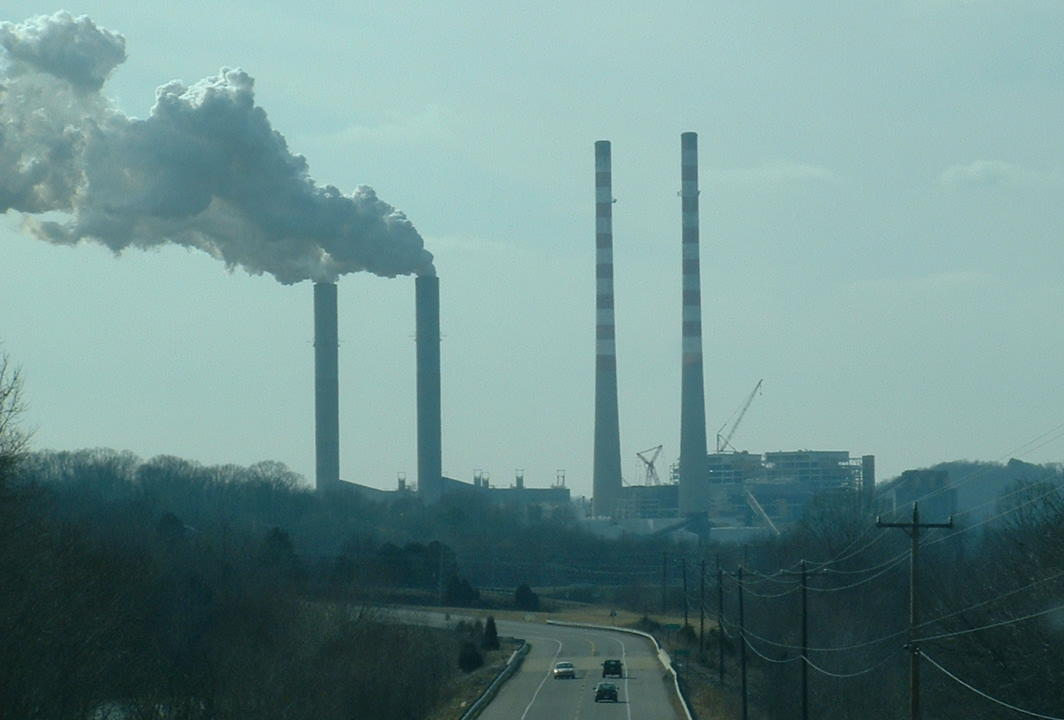
- Cumberland fossil fuel plant in Cumberland City

- Location of Cumberland City in Stewart County, Tennessee.
- Coordinates: 36°23′26″N 87°38′27″W
- Country: United States
- State: Tennessee
- County: Stewart

Area
  - Total: 5.28 sq mi (13.68 km^{2})
  - Land: 5.00 sq mi (12.96 km^{2})
  - Water: 0.28 sq mi (0.72 km^{2})
- Elevation: 384 ft (117 m)

Population (2020)
  - Total: 305
  - Density: 60.9/sq mi (23.53/km^{2})
- Time zone: UTC-6 (Central (CST))
  - Summer (DST): UTC-5 (CDT)
- ZIP code: 37050
- Area code: 931
- FIPS code: 47-18820
- GNIS feature ID: 1306226

Cumberland City is a town in Stewart County, Tennessee. As of the 2020 census, Cumberland City had a population of 305. It is part of the Clarksville, TN — Kentucky Metropolitan Statistical Area.

Cumberland City is the site of a TVA Cumberland Fossil Plant along the Cumberland River that provides 2.6 gigawatts of electric power to much of the area, including the cities of Clarksville in Montgomery County and Dickson in Dickson County.

The power plant's stacks (some of the tallest structures in the state) can be seen for at least 30 miles (48 km) away.

== Geography ==
Cumberland City is located at 36°23′26″N 87°38′27″W (36.390469, -87.640801).

According to the United States Census Bureau, the town has a total area of 5.3 square miles (13.7 km^{2}), of which 4.8 square miles (12 km^{2}) is land and 0.5 square miles (1.3 km^{2}), or 8.9% is water.

There is an impact crater centered at Wells Creek, just south of the Cumberland Fossil Plant.

== Demographics ==
Historical population
Census	Pop.	Note	%±
1890	244		—
1920	400		—
1930	313		−21.7%
1960	314		—
1970	416		32.5%
1980	276		−33.7%
1990	319		15.6%
2000	316		−0.9%
2010	311		−1.6%
2020	305		−1.9%

=== 2020 census ===
Cumberland City racial composition
Race	Number	Percentage
White (non-Hispanic)	269	88.2%
Black or African American (non-Hispanic)	10	3.28%
Asian	1	0.33%
Other/Mixed	21	6.89%
Hispanic or Latino	4	1.31%

As of the 2020 United States census, there were 305 people, 148 households, and 64 families residing in the town.

=== 2000 census ===
As of the census of 2000, there were 316 people, 139 households, and 89 families residing in the town. The population density was 65.6 inhabitants per square mile (25.3/km^{2}). There were 178 housing units at an average density of 37.0 per square mile (14.3/km^{2}). The racial makeup of the town was 87.34% White, 7.91% African American, 0.63% Asian, 2.22% from other races, and 1.90% from two or more races. Hispanic or Latino of any race were 2.22% of the population.

There were 139 households, out of which 24.5% had children under the age of 18 living with them, 43.2% were married couples living together, 14.4% had a female householder with no husband present, and 35.3% were non-families. 29.5% of all households were made up of individuals, and 17.3% had someone living alone who was 65 years of age or older. The average household size was 2.27 and the average family size was 2.80.

In the town, the population was spread out, with 22.5% under the age of 18, 10.1% from 18 to 24, 23.4% from 25 to 44, 22.5% from 45 to 64, and 21.5% who were 65 years of age or older. The median age was 40 years. For every 100 females, there were 91.5 males. For every 100 females age 18 and over, there were 88.5 males.

The median income for a household in the town was $21,750, and the median income for a family was $26,250. Males had a median income of $31,875 versus $17,500 for females. The per capita income for the town was $14,363. About 22.8% of families and 27.3% of the population were below the poverty line, including 37.9% of those under the age of 18 and 23.8% of those 65 and older.

== Media ==
Radio Stations

- WTPR-FM 101.7 - "The Greatest Hits of All Time"
- WTPR-AM 710 - "The Greatest Hits of All Time"
