= Erin, Tennessee =

- City
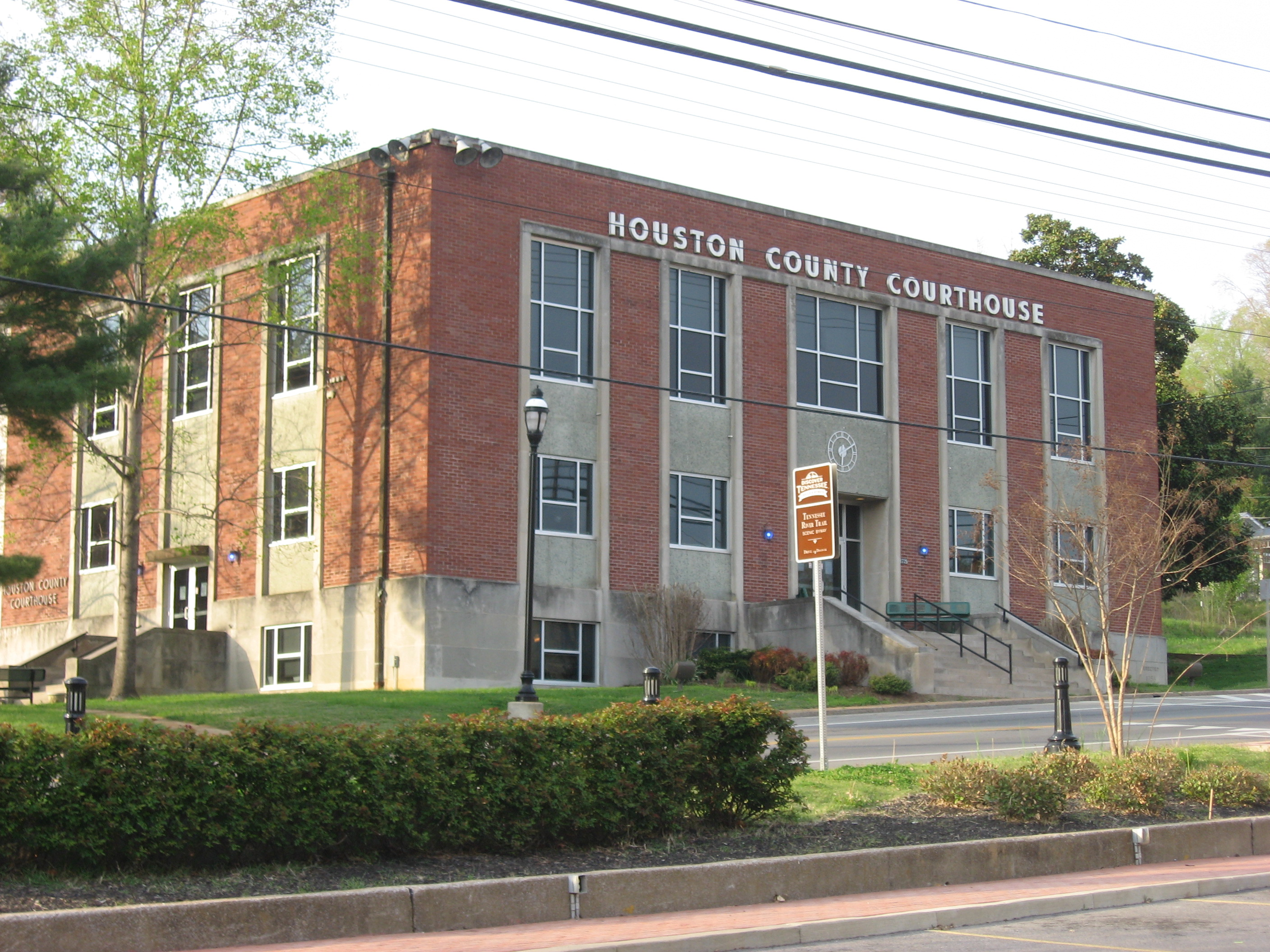
- Houston County Courthouse
- Nicknames: Irish Town Tennessee, The Shamrock City
- Location of Erin in Houston County, Tennessee.
- Coordinates: 36°19′1″N 87°41′53″W
- Country: United States
- State: Tennessee
- County: Houston
- Settled: approx. 1780

Government
  - Mayor: Paul Bailey

Area
  - Total: 3.90 sq mi (10.10 km^{2})
  - Land: 3.90 sq mi (10.09 km^{2})
  - Water: 0.0039 sq mi (0.01 km^{2})
- Elevation: 479 ft (146 m)

Population (2020)
  - Total: 1,224
  - Density: 314.1/sq mi (121.29/km^{2})
- Time zone: UTC-6 (CST)
  - Summer (DST): UTC-5 (CDT)
- ZIP code: 37061
- Area code: 931
- FIPS code: 47-24320
- GNIS feature ID: 1283839
- Website: www.cityoferintn.gov

Erin is a city in and the county seat of Houston County, Tennessee. The population was 1,224 at the time of the 2020 census and 1,324 at the time of the 2010 census.

== History ==
The city was perhaps named for Erin, a poetic name for Ireland.

Each year in March, beginning in 1962 the town has held a weeklong Irish festival, one of the top ten celebrations in the U.S., with a parade, banquets, pageants, arts and crafts, and other events celebrating Erin's Irish heritage and honoring the sacrifice of Irish railroad workers who helped link Erin to the rest of the world.

An F3 tornado struck Erin on May 27, 2000, tearing roofs and walls from many homes, destroying a pavilion, and leaving 50 people in need of overnight shelter.

== Geography ==
Erin is located at 36°19′1″N 87°41′53″W (36.316998, -87.697946). The elevation is 480 feet above sea level.

According to the United States Census Bureau, the city has a total area of 4.1 square miles (11 km^{2}), all land.

=== Major roads and highways ===
- State Route 13
- State Route 49 (Main Street)
- State Route 149

=== ZIP code ===
The ZIP code used in the Erin area is 37061.

=== Area code ===
Erin uses the area code 931.

== Government ==
- Board of Aldermen & Mayor meets first Tuesday of the month at 6:00 p.m. at Erin City Hall.
- Planning Commission meets on the fourth Monday of the month at 6:00 p.m. at Erin City Hall.

=== Elected officials ===
- City Mayor: Paul Bailey
- City Recorder: Angela Neilson
- City Bookkeeper: Cheryl Hollis
- City Clerks: Betty Beard and Farrah Dennis

=== Aldermen ===
- Ward 1: Lou Anne Pollard and Wanda Lockhart
- Ward 2: Betsy Ligon (Vice Mayor) and Cecil Baggett
- Ward 3: Linda Owens and Nethla Shires
- Ward 4: Loraine Beechum and Paul J. Gooden

== Demographics ==
Historical population
Census	Pop.	Note	%±
1880	485		—
1890	789		62.7%
1910	943		—
1920	855		−9.3%
1930	819		−4.2%
1940	905		10.5%
1950	858		−5.2%
1960	1,097		27.9%
1970	1,165		6.2%
1980	1,614		38.5%
1990	1,586		−1.7%
2000	1,490		−6.1%
2010	1,324		−11.1%
2020	1,224		−7.6%

=== 2020 census ===
As of the 2020 census, the city had a population of 1,224, and the median age was 47.3 years. Children under the age of 18 made up 20.4% of residents, while those 65 and older comprised 27.7% of the population. For every 100 females there were 87.2 males, and for every 100 females age 18 and over there were 81.4 males age 18 and over.

0.0% of residents lived in urban areas, while 100.0% lived in rural areas.

There were 475 households in the city, of which 27.4% had children under the age of 18 living in them. Of all households, 37.5% were married-couple households, 20.8% were households with a male householder and no spouse or partner present, and 36.2% were households with a female householder and no spouse or partner present. About 39.1% of all households were made up of individuals and 18.3% had someone living alone who was 65 years of age or older.

There were 534 housing units, of which 11.0% were vacant. The homeowner vacancy rate was 3.7% and the rental vacancy rate was 5.3%.

Racial composition as of the 2020 census
Race	Number	Percent
White	1,063	86.8%
Black or African American	86	7.0%
American Indian and Alaska Native	4	0.3%
Asian	3	0.2%
Native Hawaiian and Other Pacific Islander	5	0.4%
Some other race	13	1.1%
Two or more races	50	4.1%
Hispanic or Latino (of any race)	31	2.5%

=== 2000 census ===
As of the census of 2000, there was a population of 1,490, with 588 households and 355 families residing in the city. The population density was 363.6 inhabitants per square mile (140.4/km^{2}). There were 653 housing units at an average density of 159.4 units per square mile (61.5 units/km^{2}). The racial makeup of the city was 86.38% White, 10.40% African American, 0.27% Native American, 0.67% from other races, and 2.28% from two or more races. Hispanic or Latino of any race were 0.94% of the population.

There were 588 households, out of which 28.4% had children under the age of 18 living with them, 40.1% were married couples living together, 16.3% had a female householder with no husband present, and 39.5% were non-families. 37.2% of all households were made up of individuals, and 21.9% had someone living alone who was 65 years of age or older. The average household size was 2.23 and the average family size was 2.92.

In the city the population was spread out, with 22.3% under the age of 18, 7.6% from 18 to 24, 22.4% from 25 to 44, 22.3% from 45 to 64, and 25.4% who were 65 years of age or older. The median age was 43 years. For every 100 females, there were 81.7 males. For every 100 females age 18 and over, there were 74.5 males.

The median income for a household in the city was $23,107, and the median income for a family was $30,833. Males had a median income of $26,484 versus $18,333 for females. The per capita income for the city was $15,281. About 19.2% of families and 23.7% of the population were below the poverty line, including 30.4% of those under age 18 and 25.1% of those age 65 or over.

== Schools ==
=== Public high schools ===
- Houston County Adult High School (Students: 2; Location: 3573 West Main Street; Grades: 11–12)
- Houston County High School (Location: Hwy 149 Street; Grades: 09 - 12)

=== Public primary/middle schools ===
- Erin Elementary School (Students: 456; Location: 6500 State Route 13; Grades: K–5)
- Houston County Middle School (Students: 338; Location: 1241 West Main Street; Grades: 6–8)
