= Tennessee State Route 249 =

State highway in Tennessee, United States

State Route 249
- SR 249 highlighted within Cheatham County

Route information
- Maintained by TDOT
- Length: 29.6 mi (47.6 km)
- Existed: July 1, 1983–present

Major junctions
- South end: I-40 in Kingston Springs
- US 70 in Pegram; SR 49 in Ashland City; SR 12 in Ashland City; US 41A in rural northeastern Cheatham Co.
- North end: I-24 southeast of Pleasant View

Location
- Country: United States
- State: Tennessee
- Counties: Cheatham

Highway system
- Tennessee State Routes; Interstate; US; State
← SR 248	→ SR 250

State Route 249 (SR 249) is a north–south secondary state highway located in Middle Tennessee. The route is located entirely in Cheatham County.

== Route description ==
SR 249 is one of three state routes in Tennessee that begins and ends with an interchange along a freeway or interstate. The others being SR 385 and SR 109. any type. Its southern and northern termini are with I-40 and I-24 in the southern and northern ends of the county, respectively.

SR 249 begins in Kingston Springs at the Exit 188 interchange of I-40. It continues northward through Pegram to Ashland City, then it turns northeast to end at I-24's exit 31 interchange in northeastern Cheatham County.

Concurrencies involved in this route includes US 70 (SR 1) in Pegram, SR 49 through Ashland City, and SR 12 in downtown Ashland City.

== Major intersections ==
The entire route is in Cheatham County.

Location	mi	km	Destinations	Notes
Kingston Springs	0.0	0.0	I-40 – Memphis, Nashville	Southern terminus; I-40 exit 188; begins state maintenance as Luyben Hills Road
Pegram			US 70 west (SR 1 west) – Dickson, Montgomery Bell State Park	Southern end of US 70/SR 1 overlap
Pegram			US 70 east (SR 1 east) – Nashville	Northern end of US 70/SR 1 overlap
			SR 251 east (River Road) – Bellevue	Western terminus of SR 251
Ashland City			SR 49 west – Charlotte	Southern end of SR 49 overlap
Ashland City			SR 49 Bridge over the Cumberland River	
Ashland City			SR 455 (Tennessee Waltz Parkway)	Ashland City Bypass for SR 12
Ashland City			SR 12 north (Main Street) – Clarksville	Southern end of SR 12 overlap
Ashland City			SR 12 south (Main Street) – Nashville	Northern end of SR 12 overlap
Ashland City			SR 49 north – Pleasant View, Springfield	Northern end of SR 49 overlap
			US 41A (SR 112) – Clarksville, Pleasant View, Nashville	
	29.6	47.6	I-24 – Clarksville, Nashville	I-24 Exit 31; End state maintenance; Continues as New Hope Road
1.000 mi = 1.609 km; 1.000 km = 0.621 mi: Concurrency terminus
