= Tennessee House of Representatives 78th district =

State legislative district in Tennessee

Tennessee's 78th State House of Representatives district
- Map of Tennessee House districts with the 78th District shaded in red
Representative
Mary Littleton; R–Dickson
- Demographics: 87.2% White; 2.6% Black; 5.4% Hispanic; 0.2% Native American; 0.1% Hawaiian/Pacific Islander; 0.3% Other; 3.7% Multiracial
- Population (2024): 69,087

The Tennessee House of Representatives 78th district is one of the 99 legislative districts in the Tennessee House of Representatives. The district covers all of Cheatham County and part of eastern Dickson County. It includes the city of Pleasant View, and part of Dickson. It also contains the towns of White Bluff, Kingston Springs, Pegram, and Ashland City. It has ben represented by Mary Littleton since 2013.

== Demographics ==
The Tennessee Comptroller estimates at the current population at 69,087 as of 2024.

- 87.2% of the district is White
- 2.6% of the district is African-American
- 5.4% of the district is Hispanic
- 3.7% of the district is Two or more races

== History ==
The 88th Tennessee General Assembly was the first in which all districts were numbered. At that time, the 78th district was made up of Crockett and Dyer counties. The 89-90th GAs changed the shape to Dyer and Lake counties. The 91st and 92nd GAs also added Gibson county. From the 93rd to the 102nd GA, it was again made up of Crockett and Dyer counties. From the 103rd-107th GAs, it was made up of Cheatham County and parts of Montgomery County and Williamson County. Since the 108th GA, the district has been made up of Cheatham County and eastern Dickson County.

== Representatives ==
Representative	Party	Years of service	General Assembly	Hometown
Perry Keenan	Republican	2026 – Present		
Mary Littleton	Republican	2013 – 2026	108th-114th	Dickson
Philip Johnson	Republican	2003 – 2012	103rd-107th	Pegram
Ronnie M. Cole	Democratic	1993-2002	98th-102nd	Dyersburg
Harold Holt	Democratic	1987-1992	95th-97th	Dyersburg
Don E. Dills	Democratic	1981-1986	92nd-94th	Dyersburg
James O. Lanier	Democratic	1971-1980	87th-91st	Dyersburg

== Elections ==
=== 2024 ===
2024 Tennessee House of Representatives election, District 78
Party	Candidate	Votes	%
Republican	Mary Littleton (incumbent)	23,678	74.11
Democratic	Deborah Castle Doyle	8,270	25.89
Total votes		31,948	100.00

=== 2022 ===
2022 Tennessee House of Representatives election, District 78
Party	Candidate	Votes	%
Republican	Mary Littleton (incumbent)	13,084	73.63
Democratic	Krystle James	4,686	26.37
Total votes		17,770	100.00

=== 2020 ===
2020 Tennessee House of Representatives election, District 78
Party	Candidate	Votes	%
Republican	Mary Littleton (incumbent)	23,585	72.25
Democratic	Holly Spann	9,060	27.75
Total votes		32,645	100.00

=== 2018 ===
2018 Tennessee House of Representatives election, District 78
Party	Candidate	Votes	%
Republican	Mary Littleton (incumbent)	16,137	69.06
Democratic	John E. Patrick	7,230	30.94
Total votes		23,367	100.00

=== 2016 ===
2016 Tennessee House of Representatives election, District 78
Party	Candidate	Votes	%
Republican	Mary Littleton (incumbent)	18,679	74.07
Democratic	Travis S. Staten	6,539	25.93
Total votes		25,218	100.00

=== 2014 ===
2014 Tennessee House of Representatives election, District 78
Party	Candidate	Votes	%
Republican	Mary Littleton	10,240	70.72
Democratic	Jane R. Crisp	4,239	29.28
Total votes		14,479	100.00

=== 2012 ===
2012 Tennessee House of Representatives election, District 78
Party	Candidate	Votes	%
Republican	Mary Littleton (incumbent)	14,077	58.04
Democratic	Deborah Castle Doyle	8,457	34.86
Independent	Rick Wilson	1,721	7.10
Total votes		24,255	100.00
