= Tennessee State Route 455 =

State highway in Tennessee, United States

State Route 455
- Tennessee Waltz Parkway (Ashland City Bypass)
- TN 455 highlighted in red

Route information
- Maintained by TDOT
- Length: 1.9 mi (3.1 km)
- Existed: 1997–present

Major junctions
- South end: SR 12 in Ashland City
- SR 49 / SR 249 in Ashland City
- North end: SR 12 in Ashland City

Location
- Country: United States
- State: Tennessee
- Counties: Cheatham

Highway system
- Tennessee State Routes; Interstate; US; State
← SR 454	→ SR 456

State Route 455 (SR 455, also known as Tennessee Waltz Parkway) is a state highway and bypass around downtown Ashland City in Middle Tennessee.

== History ==
The route traces its origins to a 1997 referendum in which voters of Ashland City voted yes to a 1/2 cent increase in sales tax with the proceeds going to build and maintain a new Bypass back around to SR 12. The route was completed in 2005.

== Route description ==
The section of SR 455 south of SR 49/SR 249 is a narrow 2-lane highway, with the section north of SR 49/SR 249 being a 3-lane undivided highway. The entire highway passes through industrial areas and runs parallel to the Cumberland River.

== Junction list ==
The entire route is in Ashland City, Cheatham County.

mi	km	Destinations	Notes
		SR 12 (South Main Street) – Nashville	Southern terminus
		SR 49 / SR 249 (Cumberland Street) – Charlotte, Pegram, Downtown Ashland City, Pleasant View	
		SR 12 (North Main Street) – Clarksville	Northern terminus
1.000 mi = 1.609 km; 1.000 km = 0.621 mi
