= Joelton, Nashville =

Community in Davidson and Cheatham counties, Tennessee, United States

Joelton
- Neighborhood
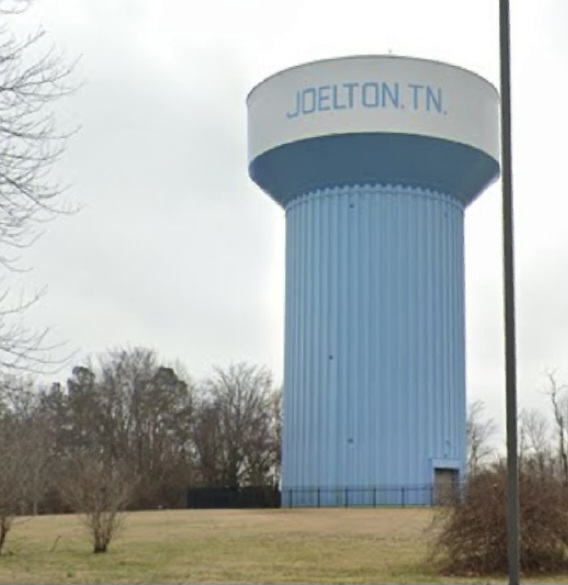
- Water tower in Joelton
- Interactive map of Joelton
- Location within Tennessee Location within the United States
- Coordinates: 36°18′47″N 86°51′55″W
- Country: United States
- State: Tennessee
- Counties: Davidson, Cheatham
- City: Nashville (Davidson County portion only)
- Time zone: UTC-6 (Central (CST))
  - Summer (DST): UTC-5 (CDT)
- Zip code: 37080
- Area codes: 615, 629

Joelton is a neighborhood of Nashville in Davidson County in the U.S. state of Tennessee. Joelton is governed by the Metropolitan Council of Nashville and Davidson County, because the government of Davidson County is consolidated with that of Nashville. Joelton's zip code also includes a portion in Cheatham County. In 2025, Joelton's zip code population was estimated at 7,429.

== Geography ==
According to the United States Census Bureau ZIP Code Tabulation Area (ZCTA) data, the 37080 ZIP code area has a total area of 49.12 square miles (127.2 km^{2}), of which 49.11 square miles (127.2 km^{2}) is land and 0.01 square miles (0.026 km^{2}) (0.02%) is water. Joelton is primarily in the northwestern portion of Davidson County along Interstate 24 (Exit 35) and junctions with U.S. Route 431, but parts of Joelton bordering Exit 31 of Interstate 24 lie in Cheatham County. Governmentally, most of Joelton is in Metropolitan Nashville – Davidson County, but it retains a separate identity as a community. Joelton is located on the edge of the Western Highland Rim a few miles from where the Nashville Basin begins. The terrain in and around the community is very rugged, with steep rolling hills where bedrock is located close to the surface. Joelton is a semi-rural community of farms and suburban neighborhoods 25 minutes northwest of Nashville. Despite the rapid growth of the Nashville metropolitan area, the area where Joelton is located has remained predominantly rural. The total population from 2014 was 8,189, an increase by 14 percent since 2000.

Farm in Joelton

== History ==
According to the NashvilleNext report compiled by Metro Nashville government, Joelton was settled principally by German, Scots-Irish, and Italian immigrants. Agriculture through small family farms on fertile lands and subsistence farming in the hills forged the economic backbone of the community until the 1920s. Joelton contains several historic rural properties. Small farms line Whites Creek Pike in the northern section of the area. Many feature bungalows as farm houses—an indication of the widespread rural popularity of this house type better known for its suburban examples. Joelton was served by a separate utility district until 1974. Councilman Guy Bates was instrumental in bringing Metro services into Joelton, including a fire hall in 1978, a paved road and street lights, and other amenities. However, the community struggled when its high school closed in 1980.

== Demographics (Note: Data is based on the Joelton Zip code which includes a bit of Cheatham County) ==
Historical population
Census	Pop.	Note	%±
2020	7,348		—
2025 (est.)	7,429		1.1%

=== 2020 census ===
Pleasant View racial composition
Race	Number	Percentage
Black or African American (non-Hispanic)	314	4.27%
White (non-Hispanic)	6,466	88.00%
Native American	29	0.39%
Asian	27	0.37%
Pacific Islander	12	0.16%
Other/Mixed	158	2.15%
Hispanic or Latino	342	4.65%

As of the 2020 United States census, there were 7,348 people residing in the zip code.

== Education ==
A middle school and elementary school are located in Joelton. Local high school students are zoned to attend either nearby Whites Creek High School in the Metropolitan Nashville school district or Sycamore Middle School and Sycamore High School in Pleasant View. Joelton High School closed its doors in 1980.

== Government ==
As a part of Metro Nashville, Joelton is represented by one Metro Council member. Residents vote in mayoral and other city elections. Nashville city services are provided on a limited basis. The general services area includes city water, street maintenance, and fire and police service. Garbage pickup is not included. A fire station is located in the heart of Joelton, maintained by Metro Nashville. The portion in Cheatham County is represented by the Cheatham County Commission.

== In popular culture ==
The music video for country music artist Miranda Lambert's "Only Prettier" was filmed in Joelton in June 2010, at the middle school.

Riders in the Sky have a song, "The Salting of the Slug" from the album The Cowboy Way, which is set in Joelton.

== See also ==
- Walden's Puddle
