= Tennessee State Route 12 =

State highway in Tennessee, United States

State Route 12
- SR 12; primary in red, unsigned in blue

Route information
- Maintained by TDOT
- Length: 62.46 mi (100.52 km)
- Existed: October 1, 1923–present

Major junctions
- South end: US 31 / US 41 / US 431 / US 41A in Nashville
- I-65 in Nashville; SR 155 (Briley Parkway) in Nashville; SR 455 in Ashland City; SR 49 / SR 249 in Ashland City; SR 48 in Clarksville; US 41A Byp. / US 41A / US 79 in Clarksville; SR 374 in Clarksville
- North end: US 41 Alt. at the Kentucky State Line near Oak Grove, KY

Location
- Country: United States
- State: Tennessee
- Counties: Davidson, Cheatham, Montgomery

Highway system
- Tennessee State Routes; Interstate; US; State
← SR 11	→ SR 13

State Route 12 (SR 12) is a state highway that runs from Davidson County, Tennessee, to Montgomery County, Tennessee.

== Route description ==
=== Davidson County ===
SR 12 begins in downtown Nashville at an intersection with US 31/US 41/US 431/US 41A/SR 6/SR 11, concurrent with US 41A as its unsigned companion route. They go north and have an interchange with I-65. They then curve to the east and start paralleling the Cumberland River before they cross it. US 41A/SR 12 then enter Nashville's northern suburbs before they separate at a y-intersection where child route SR 112 begins and US 41A follows SR 112. SR 12 becomes signed as a primary highway and turns west, coming to an interchange with SR 155 (Briley Parkway). It continues east and then leaves Nashville. SR 12 then passes through the mountains of the Highland Rim before exiting it and Davidson County and entering Cheatham County.

=== Cheatham County ===
In Cheatham County, SR 12 starts paralleling the Cumberland River before entering Ashland City. In Ashland City, it has a junction with SR 455 (Ashland City Bypass) before entering downtown and having an intersection and short concurrency with SR 49/SR 249. SR 12 then has another intersection with SR 455 (Ashland City Bypass) before leaving Ashland City. It then turns north and goes through some rural farmland before crossing into Montgomery County.

=== Montgomery County ===
In Montgomery County, SR 12 passes through Fredonia before entering Clarksville at an intersection with US 41A Bypass. SR 12 then becomes unsigned again as it runs along the southeast boundary of Clarksville before coming to an intersection and becoming concurrent with SR 13/SR 48, turning north. They then continue into downtown, again following the Cumberland River, and coming to an intersection were SR 48 separates. They then continue north on the banks of the river to an intersection with US 41A, US 79, SR 76, and SR 112 where US 41A Bypass ends. While SR 112 ends at this intersection, SR 12 turns north on US 41A/US 79/SR 76, and SR 13 turns east on US 79. They then go north through a business district before US 79/SR 76 split of and go west, and US 41A/SR 12 go north and have an interchange with SR 374 (Purple Heart Parkway) before leaving Clarksville. US 41A/SR 12 then continues north and have a junction with SR 236 before crossing the Kentucky state line and entering Oak Grove, Kentucky, where SR 12 ends and US 41A continues as US 41 ALT.

== Related route ==
State Route 455
- Location: Ashland City
- Length: 1.91 mi (3.07 km)
- Existed: 1997–present

State Route 455 (SR 455), the Tennessee Waltz Parkway, is a short bypass around Ashland City in Cheatham County. The general routing is southeast–northwest. SR 455 is less than 2 miles (3.2 km) in length. The route is a continuation of a bypass from SR 12 to SR 49 which runs by the A.O. Smith water heater factory to a point just north of the Cumberland River bridge which was not originally designated a state route, but came under state maintenance when SR 455 was created. SR 455 has its origins in a 1997 referendum in which the voters of Ashland City authorized a 1/2 cent sales tax increase with proceeds going to build and maintain a continuation of the bypass back around to SR 12. The road was finally completed in 2005.

== Major intersections ==
County	Location	mi	km	Destinations	Notes
Davidson	Nashville	0.0	0.0	US 31 / US 41 / US 431 / US 41A south (SR 6/SR 11/James Robertson Parkway)	Southern end of unsigned US 41A concurrency; US 41A continues south concurrent with US 41/US 31/US 431/SR 6/SR 11
Davidson	Nashville			I-65 – Louisville, Huntsville	I-65 exit 85
Davidson	Nashville			Bridge over Cumberland River	
Davidson	Nashville			US 41A north (SR 112 west/Clarksville Pike) – Pleasant View	Northern end of unsigned US 41A concurrency; eastern terminus of SR 112; SR 12 becomes signed as a primary highway
Davidson	Nashville			SR 155 (Briley Parkway)	SR 155 exit 24; Beltway around downtown Nashville
Cheatham	Ashland City			SR 455 north (Tennessee Waltz Parkway)	Southern terminus of SR 455; Bypass around the west side of downtown
Cheatham	Ashland City			SR 49 east / SR 249 north (Frey Street) – Pleasant View	Southern end of SR 49/SR 249 concurrency
Cheatham	Ashland City			SR 49 west / SR 249 south (Cumberland Street) – Charlotte, Pegram	Northern end of SR 49/SR 249 concurrency
Cheatham	Ashland City			SR 455 south (Tennessee Waltz Parkway)	Northern terminus of SR 455; Bypass around the west side of downtown
Montgomery	Clarksville			US 41A Byp. south (S Riverside Drive)	Southern end of unsigned US 41A Bypass concurrency; southern and western bypass around downtown Clarksville; SR 12 becomes unsigned
Montgomery	Clarksville			SR 13 south / SR 48 south (Cumberland Drive) – Charlotte, Erin	Southern end of SR 13/SR 48 concurrency
Montgomery	Clarksville			SR 48 south (College Street) – Downtown	Northern end of SR 48 concurrency
Montgomery	Clarksville			US 41A / US 79 (SR 13 north/SR 76 north/SR 112 east/Kraft Street/N 2nd Street) to I-24 – Downtown, Guthrie, KY	Northern terminus of US 41A Bypass; western terminus of SR 112; southern end of US 41A/US 79/SR 76 concurrency
Montgomery	Clarksville			US 79 south (SR 76 south/Dover Road) – Dover	Northern end of US 79/SR 76 concurrency
Montgomery	Clarksville			SR 374 (Purple Heart Parkway/101st Airborne Division Parkway)	Interchange; beltway around the north and east sides of Clarksville
Montgomery	Clarksville			SR 236 east (Tiny Town Road) to I-24	Western terminus of SR 236
Montgomery	Clarksville	62.46	100.52	US 41 Alt. north (Fort Campbell Boulevard) – Oak Grove, Hopkinsville	Kentucky state line; northern terminus; US 41A continues north as US 41 Alt; provides access to Fort Campbell
1.000 mi = 1.609 km; 1.000 km = 0.621 mi: Concurrency terminus

== See also ==
- List of state routes in Tennessee
