= Fannie Battle =

American social reformer and Confederate spy

Fanny Battle
- Born: Mary Frances Battle; September 24, 1842; Cane Ridge, Tennessee, United States
- Died: September 24, 1924 (aged 82); Nashville, Tennessee, United States
- Occupations: Spy; Social reformer

Fannie Battle (1842–1924) (born Mary Frances Battle) was an American social reformer and spy for the Confederate Army.

== A Spy for the Confederate Army ==
Battle was born in 1842 in Cane Ridge near Nolensville, Tennessee. She attended the Nashville Female Academy. Her three brothers and father enlisted in the Confederate Army at the start of the American Civil War. Her father, Joel Allen Battle, started a company in Nolensville, called the "Zollicoffer Guards." It eventually became the 20th Tennessee Infantry and Battle became captain. He would eventually serve as a Colonel. He was a prisoner of war and two of Battle's brothers were killed in the Battle of Shiloh.

Battle joined the Confederacy as a spy when the Union Army occupied Nashville in March 1862. She joined alongside her sister-in-law, Harriet Booker. Battle entered Nashville with a fake Federal pass, traveling in and out of the city, gathering information about the Union Army's work in the area and smuggling medicine and other supplies out of the city. On April 7, 1863, Battle and Booker were arrested for smuggling and holding fake Federal passes. They were first detained at the Tennessee State Penitentiary and then they were moved to Camp Chase in Ohio. Shortly thereafter, they were transferred to the Old Capitol Prison in Washington, D.C., where five other female Confederate spies were held.

Battle and Booker were released on May 13, 1863, in City Point, Virginia. Battle returned to Nashville and started teaching at Howard School. She taught math, geography and spelling throughout Nashville until 1886.

== Social reformer ==
In December 1881, the Cumberland River flooded. Battle met with Nashville leadership and organized the Nashville Relief Society to help poor flood victims living in flood zones near the river. Over 1,000 people were provided clothing, food and coal. As a result, Battle worked with other local leaders to create United Charities. The organization struggled to secure funding to hire an executive director. Therefore, Battle quit her job teaching in 1886 and served as the nonprofit's secretary-general, a position she would hold until her death in 1924.

During her work with United Charities, Battle created a daycare program for the children of working parents. She rented a room in a neighborhood in North Nashville, located near cotton mills that employed women mill workers. Physicians and other professionals provided pro bono services to the growing number of children in the program. Eventually, the program was named the Addison Avenue Day Home, the first daycare in Nashville. Today, it is named the Fannie Battle Day Home for Children.

In 1900, Battle created a summer camp for low-income mothers and their children. Located in Craggie Hope, it was named the Fresh Air Camp.

Sixteen years later, Battle created a fundraising campaign for the Day Home, during which carolers would perform during the Christmas holiday.

== Death and legacy ==
Battle died in September 1924. Memorial services were held at McKendree United Methodist Church. She was buried at Mt. Olivet Cemetery.

After Battle's death, the Addison Avenue Day Home was renamed the Fannie Battle Day Home for Children. In 1947, Battle's service in the Confederate Army was memorialized with a plaque at the Confederate Museum. The archives of Battle, and a portrait of her, are held in the Nashville Public Library.
