= Bethany Hills Camp =

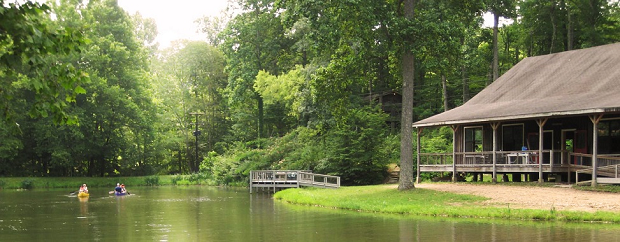

- Location within Tennessee
- Location: Cheatham County, Tennessee, United States
- Coordinates: 36.102°N 87.168°W
- Area: 370 acres (150 ha)
- Elevation: 758 ft (231 m)
- Established: ~1900
- Named for: Mary of Bethany
- Visitors: avg. 1,000+ a year
- Governing body: The Christian Church (Disciples of Christ) in Tennessee
- Website: http://bethanyhills.org

Bethany Hills Camp & Conference Center is a campground in Kingston Springs, Tennessee, United States owned by the Disciples of Christ.

== History ==
The camp was built in approximately 1900 by Nashville social worker, Fannie Battle to provide a vacation and convalescence facility for impoverished mothers and their children, and eventually became a place where children susceptible or infected with tuberculosis could come to have fresh, country air. It was named "Camp Thomas" in honor of Major John W. Thomas, who supplied funds and work for the camp during its infancy. Shortly after its opening, Camp Thomas switched to an all-year schedule, caring for those who were too sick (or unable) to leave the camp during the winter months. It included dormitories for boys and girls, cottages, a children's temple, and a nursery.

Sometime in the mid to late 1950s, Camp Thomas was bought by the Disciples of Christ and renamed for Mary of Bethany. It has since operated as a camp/conference center for the region, offering a youth camp in summer and conference services during the winter months.

== Description and facilities ==
Bethany Hills Camp is located on the border of Cheatham and Dickson counties in Middle Tennessee. The camp covers 370 acres (150 ha) and its official elevation is 643 feet (196 m). The camp's primary focus is large scale group conventions. The camp's buildings include a lodge and conference center, cabins, a recreation center, an arts and crafts building, a campfire area, a playground, several walking trails, a stocked lake, and a swimming pool. Additionally, a large field, circled by a small creek, allows for large-scale camping for groups such as Boy Scouts and Girl Scouts.
