= Sycamore High School =

Sycamore High School may refer to:

- Bishop Sycamore High School scandal, Columbus, Ohio
- Sycamore High School (Georgia), Sycamore, Georgia
- Sycamore High School (Illinois) Sycamore, Illinois
- Sycamore High School (Ohio), Cincinnati, Ohio
- Sycamore High School (Tennessee), Pleasant View, Tennessee
