= Belltown =

Belltown may refer to:

== Places ==
=== United States ===
- Belltown, California, United States
- Belltown, Delaware, United States
- Belltown, Illinois, United States
- Belltown, Seattle, a neighborhood in Seattle, Washington, United States
- Belltown, a neighborhood in Stamford, Connecticut, United States
- "Belltown, USA", a nickname for East Hampton, Connecticut, United States
- Bell Town, Tennessee, an unincorporated rural community in Cheatham County, Tennessee, United States

=== Other places ===
- Belltown, a neighbourhood in Douala, Cameroon
- Belltown, Ottawa, a neighbourhood in Ottawa, Canada

== Other uses ==
- Belltown Media, Inc., a former publisher of the Linux Journal from 2006 to 2017
