= Cheatham County Central High School =

Location
- 1 Cub Circle; Ashland City, Tennessee 37015; United States; 36.3043°N 87.0934°W

Information
- Type: Public
- Principal: Stephen Wenning
- Grades: 9–12
- Enrollment: 553 (2023–24)
- Student to teacher ratio: 16:1
- Colors: Cardinal; White
- Team name: Cubs
- Website: CCCHS

Cheatham County Central High School is a public high school in Ashland City, Tennessee serving students in grades 9–12 as part of the Cheatham County School District.

== History ==
The original Cheatham County Central High School building was built in 1919. It was demolished in 1970 and replaced by newer school facilities in Ashland City as part of countywide modernization and consolidation efforts, leading to the establishment of the present Cheatham County Central High School campus.

In 1986, the school made national headlines after participating in a state-run program where students have a say in how their peers are disciplined.

In 2011, a student died by suicide after experiencing anti-gay bullying, spurring discussion on whether the school's anti-bullying policy went far enough.

== Academics and ratings ==
Cheatham County Central's overall academic performance on standardized tests is below both county and state averages, particularly in math proficiency, where approximately 14% of students score at or above proficiency compared to a state average of around 34%. Reading proficiency is slightly above state levels at about 39%.

The school is ranked in the bottom 50% of Tennessee high schools based on combined test scores. According to SchoolDigger's 2025 statewide rankings, Cheatham County Central was 187th out of 389 Tennessee high schools. It also has a GreatSchools rating of 3 out of 10.

Niche assigns the school a C grade academically, with a reported graduation rate of about 77%. The average ACT score for the school in 2025 was a 19.

== Athletics ==
Cheatham County Central fields athletic teams known as the Cubs, competing in football, basketball, baseball, softball, and other interscholastic activities. The school's athletics programs participate under the Tennessee Secondary School Athletic Association (TSSAA). In recent years, the school's football stadium underwent a major renovation, with older concrete bleachers replaced by new aluminum installations funded by the Cheatham County School Board and county commission. Due to the construction schedule, the football team played several “home” games at away fields during part of the 2024 season.

In 2025, new aluminum bleachers debuted. In 2026, the school's boys soccer team qualified for the state tournament for the first time.

== Demographics ==
In the 2023–2024 school year, CCCHS's student body was:

- 76.3% White
- 11.2% Hispanic
- 6.0% Black/African American
- 5.1% two or more races
- 1.3% Native American/Native Hawaiian/Pacific Islander
- 0.2% Asian
