= Craggie Hope, Tennessee =

- Unincorporated area
- (Rough) Location of Craggie Hope in Cheatham County, Tennessee.

- Location within Tennessee Location within the United States
- Coordinates: 36°5′40″N 87°8′50″W
- Country: United States
- State: Tennessee
- County: Cheatham
- Elevation: 522 ft (159 m)

Population
  - Estimate (2016): 2,763
- Time zone: UTC-6 (Central (CST))
  - Summer (DST): UTC-5 (CDT)
- ZIP code: 37082
- Area code(s): 615, 629

Craggie Hope, Tennessee is an unincorporated small rural community located on the CSX Transportation railroad (formerly the Louisville and Nashville Railroad) line from Nashville to Memphis in southern Cheatham County, Tennessee.

At the beginning of the 21st century when all incorporated Tennessee communities were required to provide the state government with 20-year "urban growth plans", the nearby community of Kingston Springs at first planned to include Craggie Hope in its "urban growth boundary". The South Cheatham Advocate newspaper published there reported that community residents protested sufficiently at a public meeting regarding the proposed boundary that the plan to include Craggie Hope in it was abandoned. At this time it was stated that the community had approximately 100 residents, or slightly fewer; as the community does not have any formal boundaries as it is not a census-designated place, the accuracy of such a number is debatable.

== Notable places ==
Craggie Hope is the location of Bethany Hills, a youth camp associated with the Christian Church (Disciples of Christ). It was also previously the location of another camp, the "Fresh-Air Camp", an attempt to get inner city children, particularly those infected with or susceptible to tuberculosis, out into the more healthful country air. It has been the site of efforts to build a memorial honoring atomic veterans at its "Lovers' Leap", a scenic bluff vista over the valley of Turnbull Creek which has also been the site of serious and even fatal accidents, usually involving the abuse of alcohol.

== History ==
Below the hill and down the railroad from the old hotel was the McLean Cottage, owned by Nashville stove manufacturer I. F. McLean of the Arcade on 4th Avenue, Nashville. There was also "The Pines" cottage of Dr. Van Sanders. Across the street from the hotel on hill was the largest of the summer homes, the Cheek Cottage, belonging to Mr and Mrs. Joel Cheek of the Maxwell House Coffee fortune. Other cottages belonging to familiar Nashville names included those occupied by Alex, Erwin and Dillard Goodpasture, T. W. Moore and family, Mrs. Will Trousdale, Mrs. John Webber and Mr. and Mrs. Frank Davis.
