= Cheap Hill, Tennessee =

Cheap Hill
- Unincorporated community
- Location within Tennessee Location within the United States
- Coordinates: 36°19′57″N 87°09′22″W
- Country: United States
- State: Tennessee
- County: Cheatham
- Time zone: UTC-6 (Central (CST))
  - Summer (DST): UTC-5 (CDT)

Cheap Hill is an unincorporated community in Cheatham County, in the U.S. state of Tennessee.

== History ==
A post office called Cheap Hill was established in 1877, and remained in operation until 1921. According to tradition, Cheap Hill was so named on account of a store once located there which was known for its low prices.
