= Mary Littleton =

American politician (born 1957)

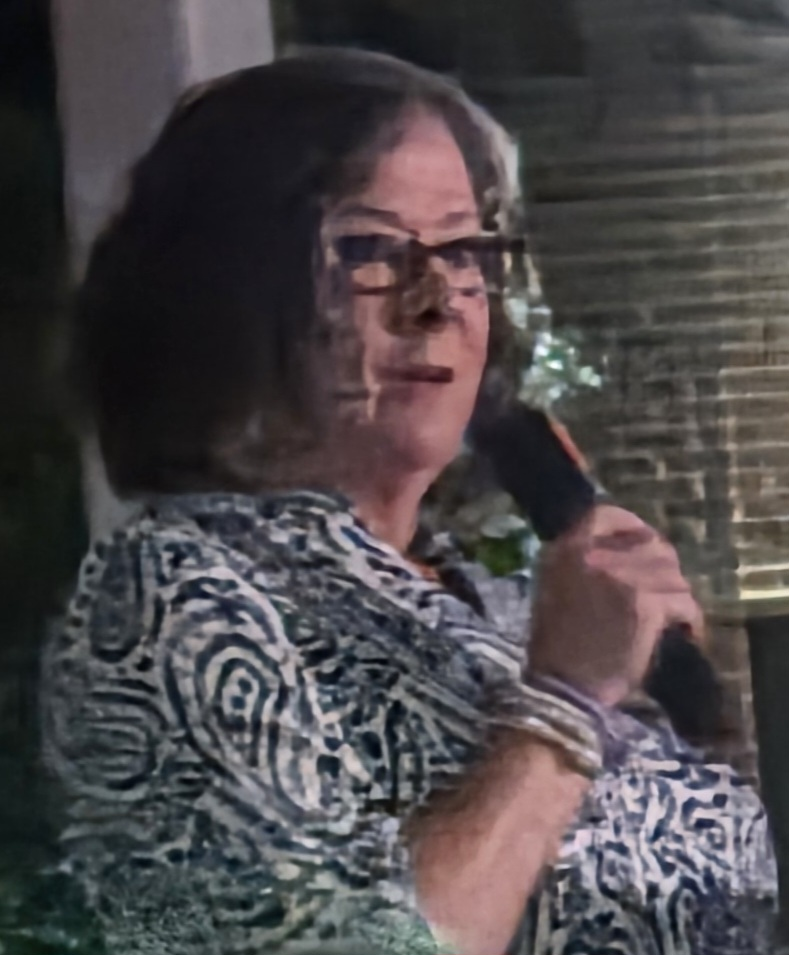
- Littleton in 2025

Member of the Tennessee House of Representatives from the 78th district
- In office January 8, 2013 – November 3, 2026
- Preceded by: Phillip Johnson
- Succeeded by: Perry Keenan

Vice Chair of the Tennessee Republican Party
- In office 2010–2014

Personal details
- Born: September 7, 1957 (age 69)
- Party: Republican
- Children: 4
- Website: House website

Mary Littleton (born September 7, 1957) is an American politician. A Republican, she represented the 78th district in the Tennessee House of Representatives from January 8, 2013 to 2026.

== Tennessee House of Representatives ==
=== Tenure ===
During her time in the General Assembly, Littleton has voted for six balanced budgets, to abolish the death tax, to cut the sales tax on groceries. She also supported a large increase in funding for schools. The NRA Political Victory Fund has given her repeated "A" ratings.

In April 2017, Littleton voted against Governor Haslam's IMPROVE Act, which would help to fund road and infrastructure improvements by raising the gas and diesel tax in the state. The bill would offset those tax hikes by lowering taxes elsewhere. Referring to the state's large surplus, she said, "“When you have that much of a surplus, none of us wanted to raise taxes."

In March 2018, Littleton voted in favor of a bill to legalize medical marijuana during a meeting of the House Criminal Justice Committee. The bill ultimately died on the House floor.

During the 110th General Assembly (2017-2018), Littleton introduced legislation requiring law enforcement agencies to determine if a person arrested is a parent and, if so, if the arrest would leave a child unattended. The bill also requires law enforcement agencies to develop procedures for welfare checks of children who may be endangered by the arrest of their parent/guardian. The legislation became law.

Littleton also sponsored another, this one aimed at stopping the opioid crisis in Tennessee. This piece of legislation allows prosecutors to charge those who sell certain opioids resulting in a death with second-degree murder. The legislation was signed into law.

In 2023, Littleton supported a resolution to expel three Democratic lawmakers from the legislature for violating decorum rules. The expulsion was widely characterized as unprecedented.

=== Committee assignments ===
During the 111th General Assembly, Littleton served on the following committees.

House Judiciary Committee

- Subcommittee on Children and Families, Chair

House State Government Committee

- Subcommittee on Departments & Agencies

House Government Operations Committee

== Electoral history ==
General Elections
Year	Republican Nominee	%	Democratic Nominee	%	Independent	%
2012	Mary Littleton	58.0	Linda Hayes	34.9	Rick Wilson	7.1
2014	Mary Littleton	70.7	Jen Crisp	29.3		
2016	Mary Littleton	74.1	Travis Staten	25.9		
2018	Mary Littleton	69.0	John Patrick	30.9		
2020	Marry Littleton	72.3	Holly Spann	27.7		
2022	Marry Littleton	73.6	Krystle James	26.4		
2024	Marry Littleton	74.1	Deborah Castle Doyle	25.9		

Republican Primaries

In 2012, incumbent Republican Representative Phillip Johnson retired. Littleton ran in the seven-way August 2, 2012 Republican Primary, winning with 1,273 votes (21.4%) Littleton has been unopposed in the Republican primaries in every election from 2014 until 2018.

In the 2020 election, Littleton faced James Ebb Gupton during the Republican primaries.

== Other offices ==
Littleton was a member of the Tennessee Republican Party State Executive Committee from 2002 to 2014, and served as vice-chairwoman from 2010 to 2014.

Before that, she served as Chairwoman of the Dickson County Republican Party.

In 2015, Littleton ran for Chair of the Tennessee Republican Party.

== Personal life ==
Littleton has four adult children.

Littleton is currently serving, or has served, on the following boards/groups in the community.

- Tennessee's Safe Baby Court Advisory Committee
- Tennessee's Human Trafficking Advisory Council
- 23rd District Judicial Child Advocacy Board
- Dickson County Cancer Board
- Dickson County Relay for Life
- Dickson County Zoning and Planning Board
- Dickson County Sanitation Board
- Member: Cheatham County Chamber of Commerce
- Member: Dickson County Chamber of Commerce
- Dickson High Noon Rotary
- National Rifle Association of America
