= Bell Town, Tennessee =

- Unincorporated community
- Location within Tennessee Location within the United States
- Coordinates: 36°06′46″N 87°09′29″W
- Country: United States
- State: Tennessee
- County: Cheatham County
- Elevation: 758 ft (231 m)
- Time zone: UTC-6 (Central (CST))
  - Summer (DST): UTC-5 (CDT)
- ZIP code: 37082
- Area code: 615
- GNIS feature ID: 1276948

Bell Town (also known as Belltown) is an unincorporated rural community located in southern Cheatham County, Tennessee, United States.

== History ==
Bell Town has traditionally been an African American community. Folk history has it that the traditional residents are descendants of the slaves of Middle Tennessee ironmaster Montgomery Bell; as Bell was widely reputed to have had several slave mistresses, many inhabitants claim descent from Bell via these women. A primary school was located here until it was closed by racial integration in the 1960s; the renovated building later served as an office for a religious ministry and as a restaurant before being demolished in the late 2010s.

In the last two decades there has been considerable growth in the area, including, as racial attitudes have softened, a considerable influx of whites.

Apparently, Bell Town has never had a United States Post Office; the community's address is Kingston Springs, Tennessee. As neither Kingston Springs nor the nearby community of White Bluff have traditionally had an appreciable black population, Bell Town has served the purpose of providing these two towns with a black-oriented residential area, a purpose the community still functions in to some degree.

As Bell Town is neither an incorporated town nor a census-designated place, any estimate of its population is of necessarily limited accuracy due to the absence of any well-defined boundaries, but is generally regarded to be less than 200 persons.

== Geography ==
Bell Town is located along U.S. Highway 70.

== Cemetery ==
The Bell Town Cemetery is a historic cemetery that has been used by African Americans for generations. In 2017, the cemetery was an area of conflict when neighboring white landowners denied family members of the buried persons access to the graves.
