= Shacklett, Tennessee =

Shacklett
- Unincorporated community
- Location within Tennessee Location within the United States
- Coordinates: 36°07′29″N 87°05′53″W
- Country: United States
- State: Tennessee
- County: Cheatham
- Time zone: UTC-6 (Central (CST))
  - Summer (DST): UTC-5 (CDT)

Shacklett is an unincorporated community in Cheatham County, in the U.S. state of Tennessee.

== History ==
A post office called Shacklett was established in 1897, and remained in operation until it was discontinued in 1904. The community was named after Dr. Henry Rector Shacklett, a local physician who lived in the Dog Creek community in the late 1800s.
