= Chapmansboro, Tennessee =

- Unincorporated community
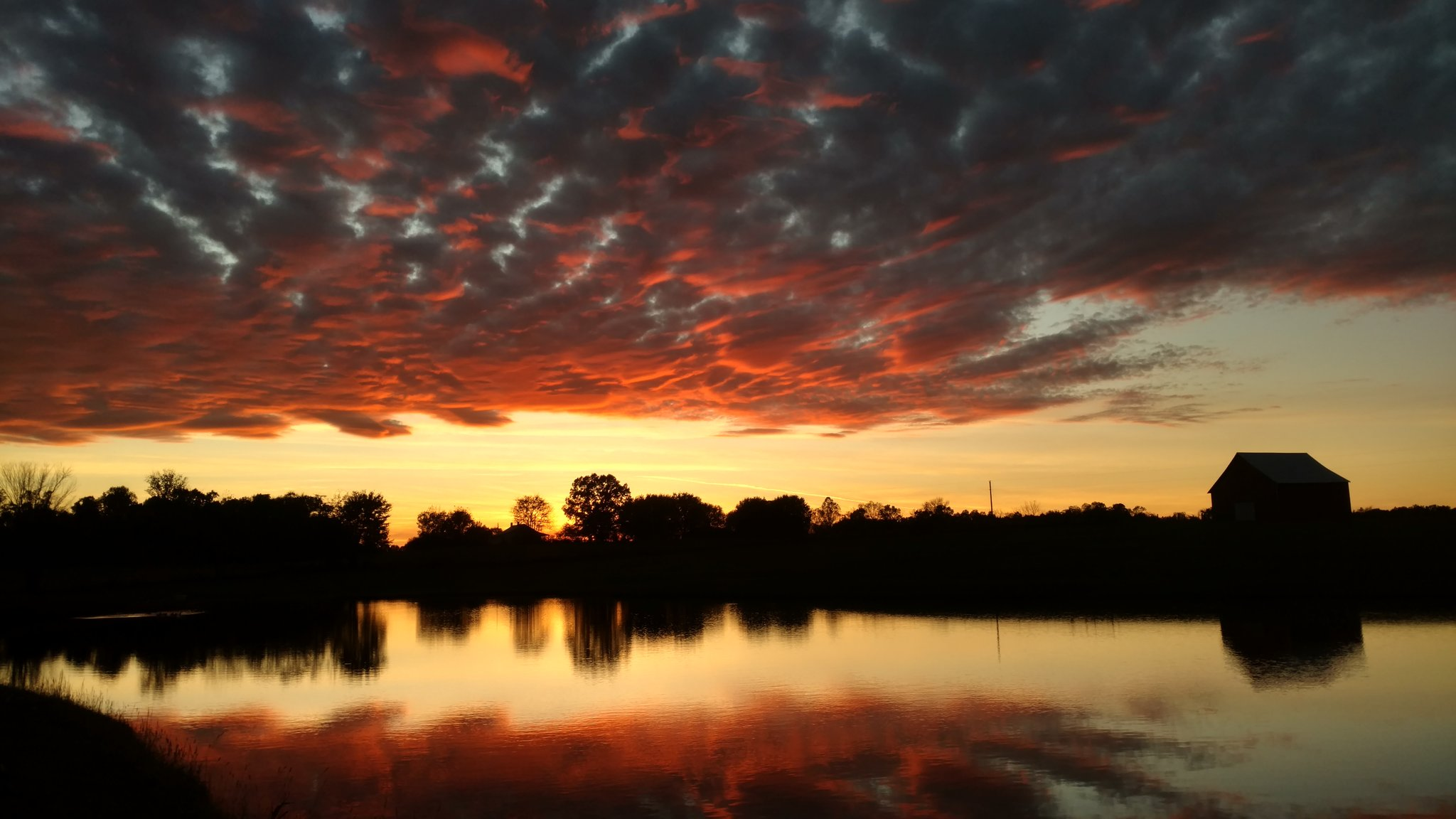
- Sunset in Chapmansboro
- Interactive map of Chapmansboro, Tennessee
- Location within Tennessee Location within the United States
- Coordinates: 36°18′44″N 87°08′29″W
- Country: United States
- State: Tennessee
- County: Cheatham
- Elevation: 400 ft (120 m)
- Time zone: UTC-6 (Central (CST))
  - Summer (DST): UTC-5 (CDT)
- ZIP code: 37035
- Area code(s): 615, 629
- GNIS feature ID: 1314821

Chapmansboro is an unincorporated community in Cheatham County. Located in Middle Tennessee, it is part of the Nashville-Davidson–Murfreesboro–Franklin, TN Metropolitan Statistical Area. It does not have its own municipal government and falls under the jurisdiction of the county administration. Its ZIP code is 37035. The population is established around 3,500 residents.

== History ==
While detailed historical records specific to Chapmansboro are scarce, historical consensus suggests that the community was named in honor of the Chapman family, whose patriarch, William Chapman was among the early settlers in the area and played a prominent role in its development.
