= Pleasant View Christian School =

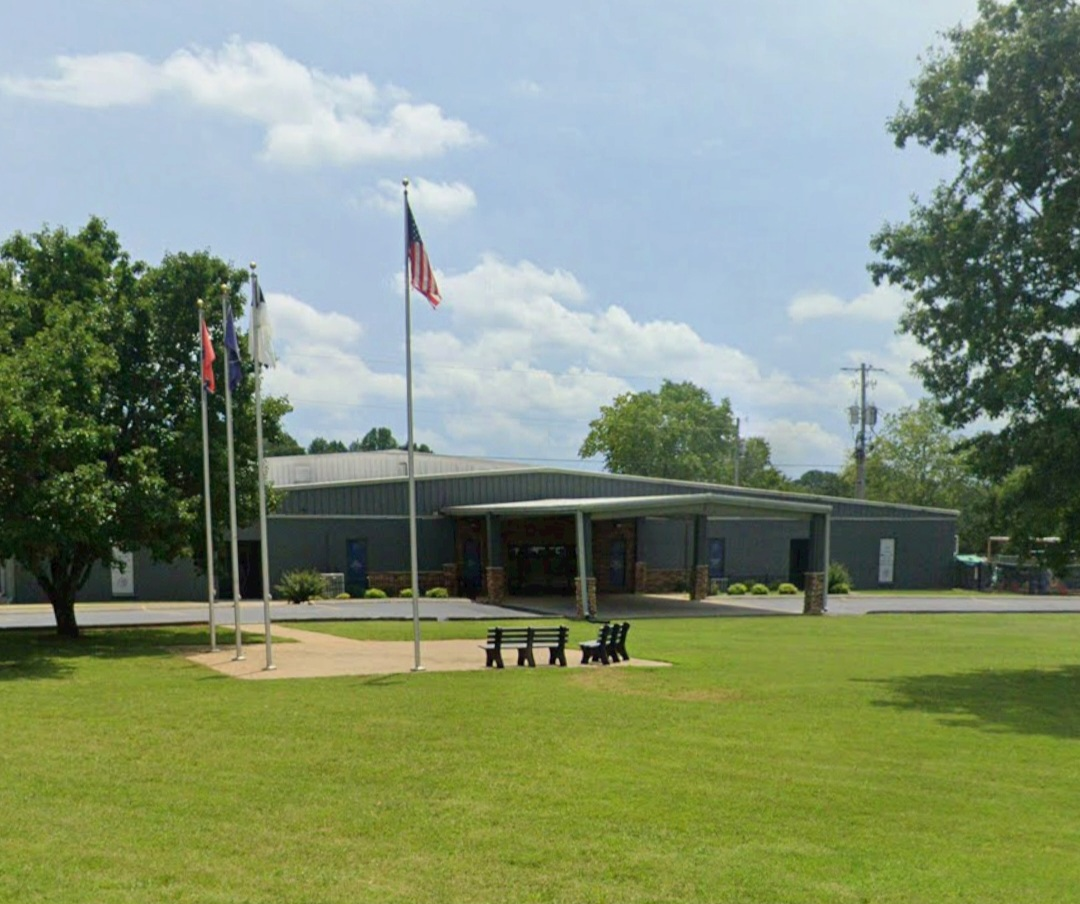
- Pleasant View Christian School

Location
- 160 Hicks Edgen Road; Pleasant View, Tennessee; United States; 36.3852°N 87.0368°W

Information
- Type: Private K-12
- Established: 1978
- Administrator: Mr. Rusty Campbell
- Grades: K4-12
- Enrollment: 310
- Mascot: Warriors
- Website: http://www.pvchristian.org

Pleasant View Christian School is a private Christian school in Pleasant View, Tennessee. It is of Free Will Baptist affiliation. In 2007, it had 481 students from pre-kindergarten to twelfth grade and had 22 teachers.

== Early history ==
Pleasant View Christian School was founded in 1978 and held its first classes at Good Springs Free Will Baptist Church in Pleasant View, Tennessee. In 1982, Pleasant View Christian moved to its current location at 160 Hicks Edgen Road. In 1985, the high school wing of the building was added. The original mascot was the Patriots, but it was changed to the Warriors in the mid-1980s.

== Accreditation ==
PVCS is fully accredited by the Tennessee Association of Christian Schools (TACS), which is affiliated with the Tennessee Department of Education.

== Dual enrollment ==
PVCS offers dual enrollment classes (one each semester) currently offered through Welch College, Nashville, TN.

== Scholarships ==
In 2013, the 22 graduates earned almost $700,000 in college scholarships.

== Administration ==
In 2003, former administrator Wayne Patton left the school. Wayne Patton was replaced by Stephen Parks, M.Ed., until the end of the school year. In 2004, Dr. Ken Riggs, Ph.D., became Pleasant View Christian School's administrator. In 2011, Dr. Seldon Buck became the school's administrator until Rusty Campbell took over in 2016.

Brandon Roysden has been the head of school since 2024.

== School board ==
The 10 school board members are elected to alternating terms each year by the corporate board of the Northern Quarterly of the Cumberland Association of Free Will Baptists.

During the 2006–2007 school year, the enrollment grew to about 500 students, making the addition of three portable buildings and new teachers necessary.

== Demographics ==
In the 2022 school year, Pleasant View Christian School's student body was:

- 96% White
- 2% Asian
- 2% Hispanic
- <1% Two or more races
- <1% Native Hawaiian or Other Pacific Islander
- <1% Native American
- <1% African American

== Athletics ==
Pleasant View Christian's Warrior athletic teams compete in the Tennessee Athletic Association of Christian Schools (TAACS). The school field teams in football, volleyball, boys and girls varsity and JV basketball, baseball, softball, and boys and girls soccer.

- 2013 Varsity Softball - State Champs
- 2011 Varsity Baseball - State Champs
- 2010 Varsity Baseball - State Champs
- 2010 Varsity Girls Softball - Undefeated in Conference, State Champs
- 2010 Varsity Girls Basketball - Second in Conference, Region Tournament Champions, State Tournament Runner-up
- 2010 JV Girls Basketball - Undefeated in Conference, District Tournament Champions
- 2009 Varsity Girls Volleyball - Second in Conference, Second in Regional Tournament, Second in State Tournament
- 2009 Varsity Baseball - State Champs
- 2009 Varsity Girls Softball - Undefeated in Conference, State Champs
- 2009 Varsity Boys Basketball - Region Final 4, State Final 4
- 2009 Varsity Girls Basketball - Region Final 4, State Final 4
- 2008 Varsity Girls Volleyball - Second in Conference, Second in Region, State Final Four
- 2008 Varsity Baseball - State Champs
- 2008 Varsity Girls Softball - State Runner Up
- 2008 Varsity Boys Basketball - Second Place in State Competition.
- 2007 J.V. Girls Basketball - First Place in District Tournament; undefeated all season.
- 2007 J.V. Girls Basketball - First Place in Conference (clinched with win at Lighthouse Christian School 32–30).
- 2006 J.V. Boys Basketball - Second in MTCAA Tournaments (3rd for the season)
- 2006 J.V. Girls Basketball - Tied with Metro Christian Academy (or Franklin Road Christian School) for second place.
- 2006 J.V. Girls Volleyball - conference and district champions for Middle Tennessee Christian Athletic Association (2006).
- 2006 Varsity Football - First year of eight man football. The Warriors ended their first season with two wins.
- 2005 Varsity Soccer - First in districts, conference champions, and made it to second round in state.
