= Kingston Springs Hotel and Buildings =

- U.S. National Register of Historic Places
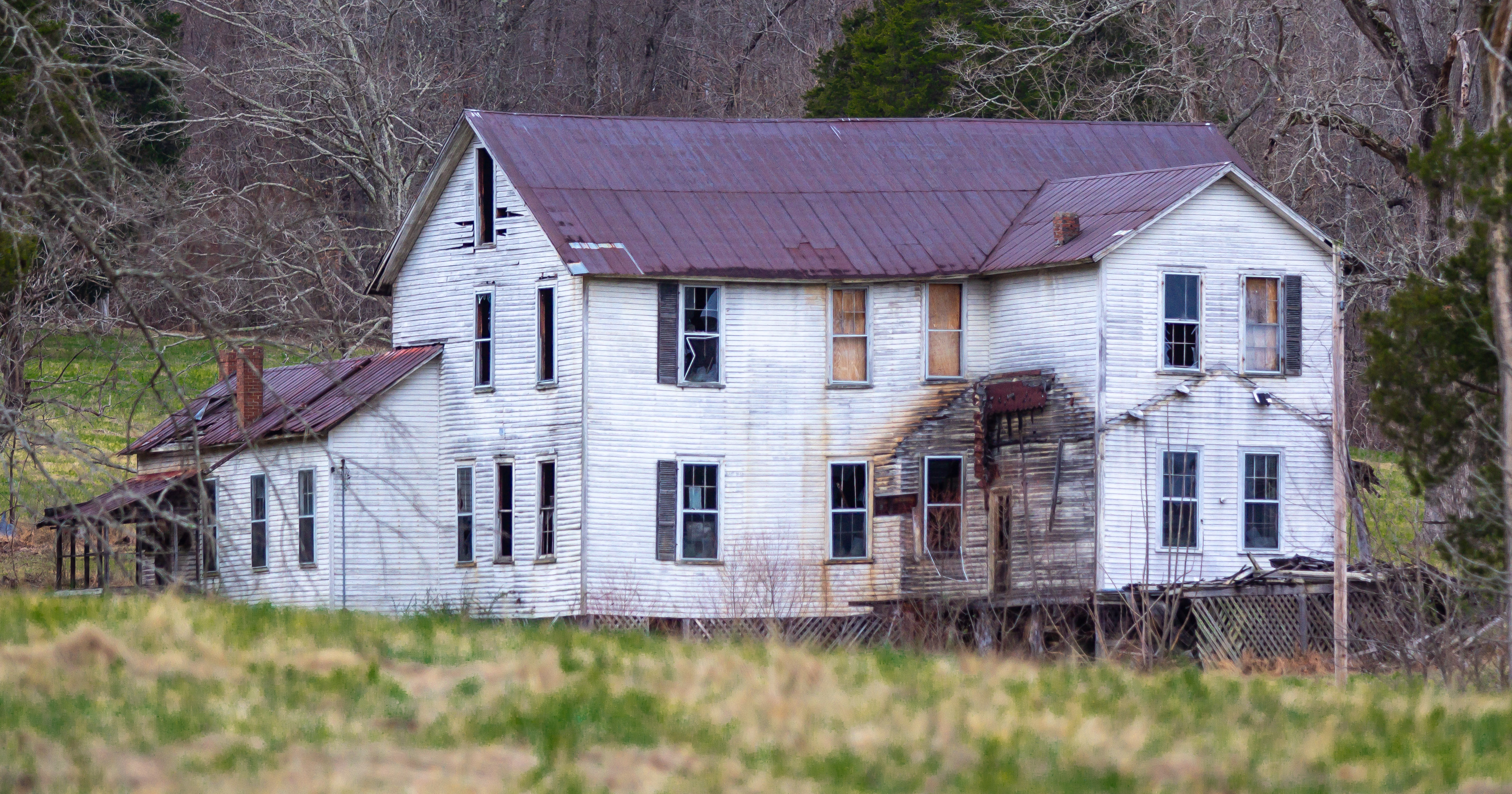
- Kingston Springs Hotel

- Location within Tennessee
- Location: Kingston Springs Road, Kingston Springs, Tennessee
- Coordinates: 36°05′41″N 87°06′48″W
- Area: 22 acres (8.9 ha)
- Built: 1890s
- Architect: Baxter J. Hodge
- NRHP reference No.: 79002417
- Added to NRHP: October 31, 1979

The Kingston Springs Hotel and Buildings is a historic hotel complex in Kingston Springs, Tennessee. It was rebuilt in the 1890s, surrounded by original 1860 cottages. It is listed on the National Register of Historic Places.

== History ==
The main hotel building was erected in the 1890s by Matt F. Allen on the site of a former hotel built by Emanuel Kreider in 1849. The first hotel burned down in the late 1880s, but thirteen cottages dating back to 1860 survived the fire. The hotel complex was acquired by W. C. West and A. E. Beard in 1908, and they closed it down in 1917.

The hotel was the subject of a painting by Max Hochstetler.

== Architectural significance ==
The hotel was designed by architect Baxter J. Hodge. It has been listed on the National Register of Historic Places since October 31, 1979.
