= Walden's Puddle =

Wildlife rehabilitation, Tennessee. U.S.

Coordinates: 36.113925°N 86.764403°W

- Headquarters: Joelton, TN
- Area served: Tennessee–Middle Tennessee
- Website: link

Walden's Puddle is a wildlife rehabilitation and education center located in Joelton, Tennessee, a suburb just outside Nashville.

It provides care and treatment to sick, injured and orphaned native Tennessee wildlife and is the only professionally staffed wildlife rehabilitation and education facility in Middle Tennessee. They do not charge for services.
