= Sycamore High School (Tennessee) =

Public school in Pleasant View, Tennessee

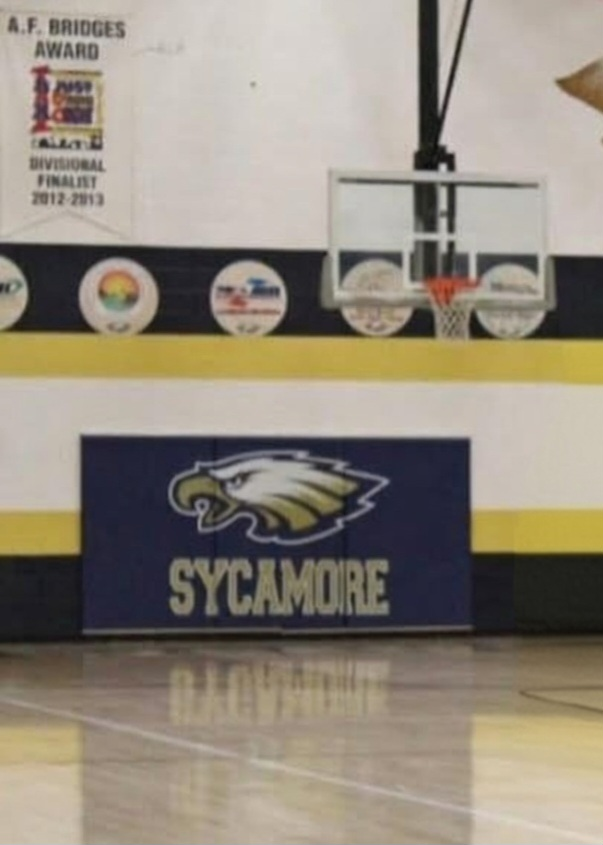
- Basketball court in Sycamore High School

Location
- 1021 Old Clarksville Pike; Pleasant View, Tennessee 37146; United States; 36.3673°N 87.0472°W

Information
- Type: Public
- Principal: Dawn Wenning
- Grades: 9-12
- Enrollment: 669 (2023-24)
- Student to teacher ratio: 18.48
- Colors: Navy Blue; Vegas Gold
- Team name: War Eagles
- Website: SHS

Sycamore High School is a public high school in Pleasant View, Tennessee. Sycamore Middle School is adjacent.

The school ranks 140th out of 389 Tennessee high schools, earning a 3-star rating from SchoolDigger, placing it above the state median overall. It also has a GreatSchools rating of 7 out of 10. The average ACT score for the school in 2025 was 19.5.

== History ==
Sycamore High School first opened in 1998 at the site of the old Sycamore Middle School as part of a district-wide reorganization to accommodate growing student enrollment in northern Cheatham County.

In 2009, current and former students on behalf of the ACLU sued Cheatham County schools for allegedly violating the First Amendment to the United States Constitution. The plaintiffs claimed that the district had illegally endorsed Christianity by distributing Gideon Bibles in class, and leading prayers at school events. By November of that year, the district responded by removing Bible passages from a Sycamore High school website. In 2010 the lawsuit was settled in favor of the ACLU, with Cheatham County Schools no longer allowing third parties to hand out religious texts or officials to lead prayer at student events.

On September 30, 2025, Sycamore High School became the first school in the county to install OpenGate weapon detection scanners. The devices were introduced as part of a district-wide security initiative following the Antioch High School shooting in Nashville earlier in the year. The rollout, overseen by Cheatham County School Resource Officers, was scheduled to continue through Fall Break across other middle and high schools in the district. According to district officials, the project cost approximately $220,000 and was modeled after similar systems used in Metro Nashville Public Schools.

== Athletics ==
Sycamore High School competes in various interscholastic sports. As a member of the Tennessee Secondary School Athletic Association (TSSAA),l. The school competes in a variety of sports, including basketball, football, baseball, softball, volleyball, soccer, tennis, wrestling, cross country, and track and field.

In 2025, the school made national headlines after a football player on the bench illegally ran on the field to tackle a Fairview High School player who was returning an interception.

== Demographics ==
Sycamore High School serves students in grades 9–12. It is fed primarily by Sycamore Middle School, which now enrolls students in grades 5–8.

In the 2023–2024 school year, Sycamore's student body was:

- 85.1% White
- 8.4% Hispanic
- 3.4% two or more races
- 1.8% Black/African American
- 0.8% Asian
- 0.6% Native American/Alaskan
