= Perry Keenan =

American politician

Member-elect of the Tennessee House of Representatives from the 78th district
- Assuming office January 12, 2027
- Succeeding: Mary Littleton

Personal details
- Party: Republican
- Website: Campaign website

Perry Keenan is an American politician. A member of the Republican Party, he is the member-elect for the Tennessee House of Representatives for the 78th district. He was elected at the 2026 election. Keenan is a former mayor and city councilman of Pleasant View, Tennessee.
