= Cheatham County, Tennessee =

County in Tennessee, United States

- County
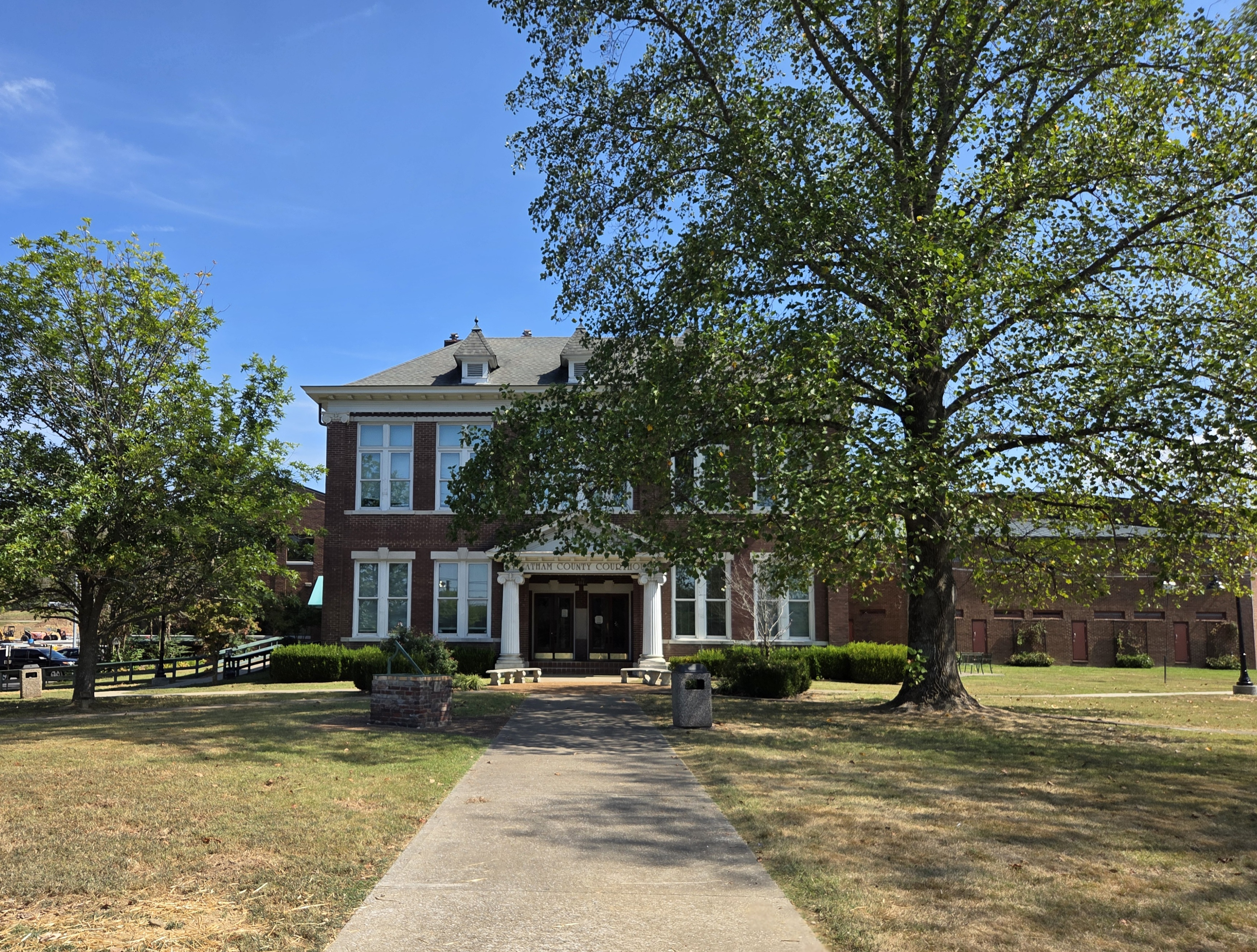
- Cheatham County Courthouse in Ashland City

- Flag Seal

- Location within the U.S. state of Tennessee
- Coordinates: 36°16′N 87°05′W
- Country: United States
- State: Tennessee
- Founded: February 28, 1856
- Named for: Edward Saunders Cheatham or Benjamin F. Cheatham
- Seat: Ashland City
- Largest city: Pleasant View

Government
  - Mayor: Bill Anderson (R)

Area
  - Total: 307 sq mi (800 km^{2})
  - Land: 302 sq mi (780 km^{2})
  - Water: 4.6 sq mi (12 km^{2}) 1.5%

Population (2020)
  - Total: 41,072
  - Estimate (2025): 42,778 ▲
  - Density: 136/sq mi (52.5/km^{2})
- Time zone: UTC−6 (Central)
  - Summer (DST): UTC−5 (CDT)
- Area code: 615, 629
- Congressional district: 7th
- Website: cheathamcountytn.gov

Cheatham County (/ˈtʃiːtəm/ CHEE-təm) is a county located in the U.S. state of Tennessee. As of the 2020 census, the population was 41,072. Its county seat is Ashland City. Cheatham County is located in Middle Tennessee, and is part of the Nashville-Davidson–Murfreesboro–Franklin, TN Metropolitan Statistical Area.

== History ==
Cheatham County was created by an act of the Tennessee General Assembly in 1856, from lands formerly of Davidson, Dickson, Montgomery, and Robertson counties. Cheatham County was named for Edward Saunders Cheatham, a state legislator.

== Geography ==
Interactive map of Cheatham County

According to the U.S. Census Bureau, the county has a total area of 307 square miles (800 km^{2}), of which 302 square miles (780 km^{2}) is land and 4.6 square miles (12 km^{2}) (1.5%) is water.

The county is bisected from northwest to southeast by the Cumberland River, with Ashland City on its northern bank. The southern portion of the county is bisected from southeast to northwest by the Harpeth River, which meanders through generally hilly country, and along whose course are located the communities of Kingston Springs, largely to the north of I-40, and Pegram, along U.S. Route 70 (US 70). The western border of the central portion of the county is defined by the course of the Harpeth. The hills east of the Harpeth and south of the Cumberland are partly set aside by the state as the Cheatham State Wildlife Management Area. North of Ashland City, the hills subside into more level highlands, where the community of Pleasant View is located just south of I-24, which generally delineates the county's northern border.

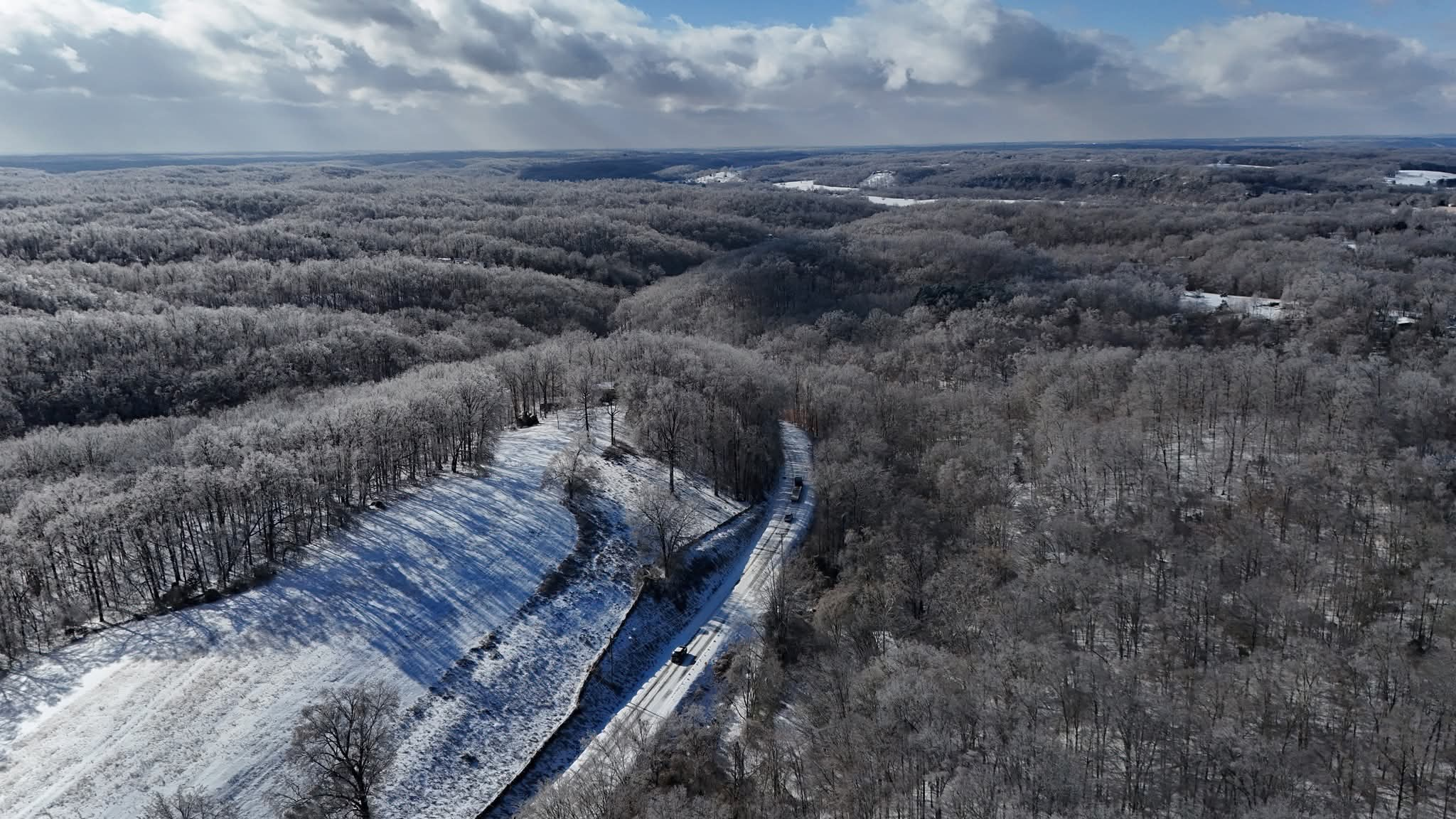
Aerial view of iced-over hills

=== Adjacent counties ===
- Robertson County (northeast)
- Davidson County (east)
- Williamson County (south)
- Dickson County (west)
- Montgomery County (northwest)

=== State protected areas ===
- Cheatham Wildlife Management Area
- Cheatham Lake Wildlife Management Area (part)
- Harpeth River State Park

=== Major highways ===
- Interstate 24
- Interstate 40
- U.S. Highway 70
- U.S. Highway 41A
- State Route 12
- State Route 49
- State Route 249
- State Route 251
- State Route 455

== Demographics ==
Historical population
Census	Pop.	Note	%±
1860	7,258		—
1870	6,678		−8.0%
1880	7,956		19.1%
1890	8,845		11.2%
1900	10,112		14.3%
1910	10,540		4.2%
1920	10,039		−4.8%
1930	9,025		−10.1%
1940	9,928		10.0%
1950	9,167		−7.7%
1960	9,428		2.8%
1970	13,199		40.0%
1980	21,616		63.8%
1990	27,140		25.6%
2000	35,912		32.3%
2010	39,105		8.9%
2020	41,072		5.0%
2025 (est.)	42,778	▲	4.2%
U.S. Decennial Census; 1790–1960 1900–1990; 1990–2000 2010–2014

=== Racial and ethnic composition ===
Cheatham County, Tennessee – Racial and ethnic composition Note: the US Census treats Hispanic/Latino as an ethnic category. This table excludes Latinos from the racial categories and assigns them to a separate category. Hispanics/Latinos may be of any race.
Race / ethnicity (NH = Non-Hispanic)	Pop 1980	Pop 1990	Pop 2000	Pop 2010	Pop 2020	% 1980	% 1990	% 2000	% 2010	% 2020
White alone (NH)	20,852	26,344	34,506	36,914	36,299	96.47%	97.07%	96.08%	94.40%	88.38%
Black or African American alone (NH)	594	532	519	552	815	2.75%	1.96%	1.45%	1.41%	1.98%
Native American or Alaska Native alone (NH)	23	80	131	115	92	0.11%	0.29%	0.36%	0.29%	0.22%
Asian alone (NH)	19	34	63	139	184	0.09%	0.13%	0.18%	0.36%	0.45%
Native Hawaiian or Pacific Islander alone (NH)	x	x	17	13	25	x	x	0.05%	0.03%	0.06%
Other race alone (NH)	0	11	16	31	127	0.00%	0.04%	0.04%	0.08%	0.31%
Mixed race or Multiracial (NH)	x	x	223	431	1,691	x	x	0.62%	1.10%	4.12%
Hispanic or Latino (any race)	128	139	437	910	1,839	0.59%	0.51%	1.22%	2.33%	4.48%
Total	21,616	27,140	35,912	39,105	41,072	100.00%	100.00%	100.00%	100.00%	100.00%

=== 2020 census ===
As of the 2020 census, the county had a population of 41,072 and 11,022 families, with a median age of 42.0 years. 21.5% of residents were under the age of 18 and 16.6% of residents were 65 years of age or older. For every 100 females there were 97.5 males, and for every 100 females age 18 and over there were 97.1 males age 18 and over.

The racial makeup of the county was 89.6% White, 2.0% Black or African American, 0.3% American Indian and Alaska Native, 0.5% Asian, 0.1% Native Hawaiian and Pacific Islander, 1.9% from some other race, and 5.7% from two or more races. Hispanic or Latino residents of any race comprised 4.5% of the population.

<0.1% of residents lived in urban areas, while 100.0% lived in rural areas.

There were 15,706 households in the county, of which 31.2% had children under the age of 18 living in them. Of all households, 54.3% were married-couple households, 16.6% were households with a male householder and no spouse or partner present, and 22.0% were households with a female householder and no spouse or partner present. About 22.5% of all households were made up of individuals and 9.1% had someone living alone who was 65 years of age or older.

There were 16,785 housing units, of which 6.4% were vacant. Among occupied housing units, 82.6% were owner-occupied and 17.4% were renter-occupied. The homeowner vacancy rate was 1.6% and the rental vacancy rate was 5.5%.

=== 2000 census ===
At the 2000 census there were 35,912 people, 12,878 households, and 10,160 families in the county. The population density was 119 people per square mile (46 people/km^{2}). There were 13,508 housing units at an average density of 45 units per square mile (17/km^{2}). The racial makeup of the county was 96.86% White, 1.48% Black or African American, 0.38% Native American, 0.18% Asian, 0.05% Pacific Islander, 0.36% from other races, and 0.70% from two or more races. 1.22%. were Hispanic or Latino of any race.

In 2005 The racial makeup of the county was 94.8% non-Hispanic whites, 2.1% African-Americans and 1.7% Latinos. In 2000 Of the 12,878 households 39.60% had children under the age of 18 living with them, 64.90% were married couples living together, 9.60% had a female householder with no husband present, and 21.10% were non-families. 16.90% of households were one person and 5.30% were one person aged 65 or older. The average household size was 2.76 and the average family size was 3.08.

The age distribution was 27.70% under the age of 18, 7.30% from 18 to 24, 33.50% from 25 to 44, 23.00% from 45 to 64, and 8.60% 65 or older. The median age was 35 years. For every 100 females, there were 100.30 males. For every 100 females age 18 and over, there were 97.40 males.

The median household income was $45,836 and the median family income was $49,143. Males had a median income of $34,476 versus $25,191 for females. The per capita income for the county was $18,882. About 5.30% of families and 7.40% of the population were below the poverty line, including 7.60% of those under age 18 and 9.40% of those age 65 or over.

== Communities ==
=== City ===
- Pleasant View

=== Towns ===
- Ashland City (county seat)
- Kingston Springs
- Pegram

=== Unincorporated communities ===
- Bell Town
- Chapmansboro
- Cheap Hill
- Craggie Hope
- Shacklett

== Government and politics ==
=== County Government ===
The county mayor serves as the chief executive officer of Cheatham County and is elected at-large. The position oversees county administration and finances. The current mayor is Republican Kerry McCarver.

The Board of County Commissioners is the county's legislative body. It is composed of twelve members elected from six districts, with two commissioners representing each district. The commission is responsible for adopting the county budget, setting the property tax rate, and overseeing county departments and services. It meets regularly at 6:00 p.m. on the third Monday of each month.

==== Countywide elected officials ====
Office	Name
District Attorney	Ray Crouch (R)
County Mayor	Bill Anderson (R)
Sheriff	Tim Binkley (R)
Trustee	Cindy Binkley Perry (R)
Assessor of Property	Cindy Dozier Burney (R)
County Clerk	Abby Short (R)
Register of Deeds	Chrissy Henderson (R)
Circuit Court Clerk	Holly Waller (R)

=== State elected offices ===
Both members that represent Cheatham County in the Tennessee General Assembly are held by Republicans.

Representatives
Position	Name	Party	First Election	District
State Senator	Kerry Roberts	Rep	2014	23
State Representative	Perry Keenan	Rep	2026	78

=== Political history ===
Cheatham County was historically a "Solid South" Democratic stronghold, like much of Middle Tennessee, consistently supporting Democratic presidential candidates through much of the 20th century and even supporting segregationist George Wallace in 1968. Republican candidates began gaining traction near the final quarter of the century, with Richard Nixon carrying the county in 1972 for the first time in recent memory. (Note: There is no county-level data available for the 1864 United States presidential election in Tennessee. Prior to that election, Republican candidates were not on the ballot in Tennessee, and Cheatham County did not vote for a Republican presidential candidate again until 1972.) After 1972, Democrats carried the county through the later 1970s and into the 1990s, although it supported Republicans Ronald Reagan in 1984 and George H. W. Bush in 1988.

In 2000, Cheatham County began solidifying as a Republican stronghold, when George W. Bush carried it over native Tennessean Al Gore. Since then, the county has voted reliably Republican in every presidential election, with Donald Trump surpassing 70% of the vote in 2016, and Democrats have not approached one-third of the county's vote share since. The last time Cheatham County voted for a Democratic candidate in a statewide race was for Phil Bredesen in 2006, and the last time it voted for a Democratic candidate on a presidential level, was for Bill Clinton in 1996.

United States presidential election results for Cheatham County, Tennessee
Year	Republican		Democratic		Third party(ies)	
Year	No.	%	No.	%	No.	%
1872	284	28.80%	702	71.20%	0	0.00%
1876	267	22.90%	899	77.10%	0	0.00%
1880	291	24.85%	794	67.81%	86	7.34%
1884	335	25.89%	959	74.11%	0	0.00%
1888	305	21.66%	1,063	75.50%	40	2.84%
1892	242	15.64%	732	47.32%	573	37.04%
1896	496	27.99%	1,237	69.81%	39	2.20%
1900	440	26.55%	1,190	71.82%	27	1.63%
1904	420	28.99%	1,015	70.05%	14	0.97%
1908	526	30.33%	1,206	69.55%	2	0.12%
1912	317	20.33%	1,096	70.30%	146	9.36%
1916	439	28.10%	1,117	71.51%	6	0.38%
1920	569	31.77%	1,219	68.06%	3	0.17%
1924	181	16.98%	868	81.43%	17	1.59%
1928	488	34.78%	913	65.07%	2	0.14%
1932	180	11.52%	1,370	87.71%	12	0.77%
1936	183	11.86%	1,352	87.62%	8	0.52%
1940	331	14.61%	1,932	85.26%	3	0.13%
1944	216	13.37%	1,398	86.51%	2	0.12%
1948	193	6.26%	2,731	88.58%	159	5.16%
1952	536	19.31%	2,222	80.04%	18	0.65%
1956	498	17.72%	2,297	81.71%	16	0.57%
1960	683	26.20%	1,883	72.23%	41	1.57%
1964	803	22.60%	2,750	77.40%	0	0.00%
1968	669	16.96%	778	19.73%	2,497	63.31%
1972	2,235	60.10%	1,321	35.52%	163	4.38%
1976	1,376	24.29%	4,225	74.59%	63	1.11%
1980	2,296	37.03%	3,771	60.81%	134	2.16%
1984	4,109	57.32%	3,007	41.94%	53	0.74%
1988	4,132	56.99%	3,067	42.30%	51	0.70%
1992	3,496	35.72%	4,817	49.21%	1,475	15.07%
1996	4,283	42.98%	4,883	49.01%	798	8.01%
2000	6,356	50.38%	6,062	48.05%	198	1.57%
2004	9,676	61.64%	5,918	37.70%	103	0.66%
2008	10,702	65.14%	5,498	33.47%	228	1.39%
2012	10,268	67.63%	4,659	30.69%	255	1.68%
2016	11,297	70.94%	3,878	24.35%	749	4.70%
2020	14,438	71.26%	5,514	27.22%	308	1.52%
2024	14,987	72.26%	5,464	26.34%	290	1.40%

== Notable people ==
- Gene Allison, R&B singer
- Mark Green, politician, physician, and retired U.S. Army major, former Republican U.S. representative for Tennessee's 7th congressional district
- Hickok45, firearm content YouTuber
- Horace McCoy, writer
- Caleb Plant, professional boxer
- Ryan Stack, former professional basketball player
- Pat Summitt, women's college basketball head coach
- Upchurch, rapper, singer-songwriter, and comedian
- Clive Westlake, British songwriter

== See also ==
- National Register of Historic Places listings in Cheatham County, Tennessee
- List of counties in Tennessee
