= Pegram, Tennessee =

- Town
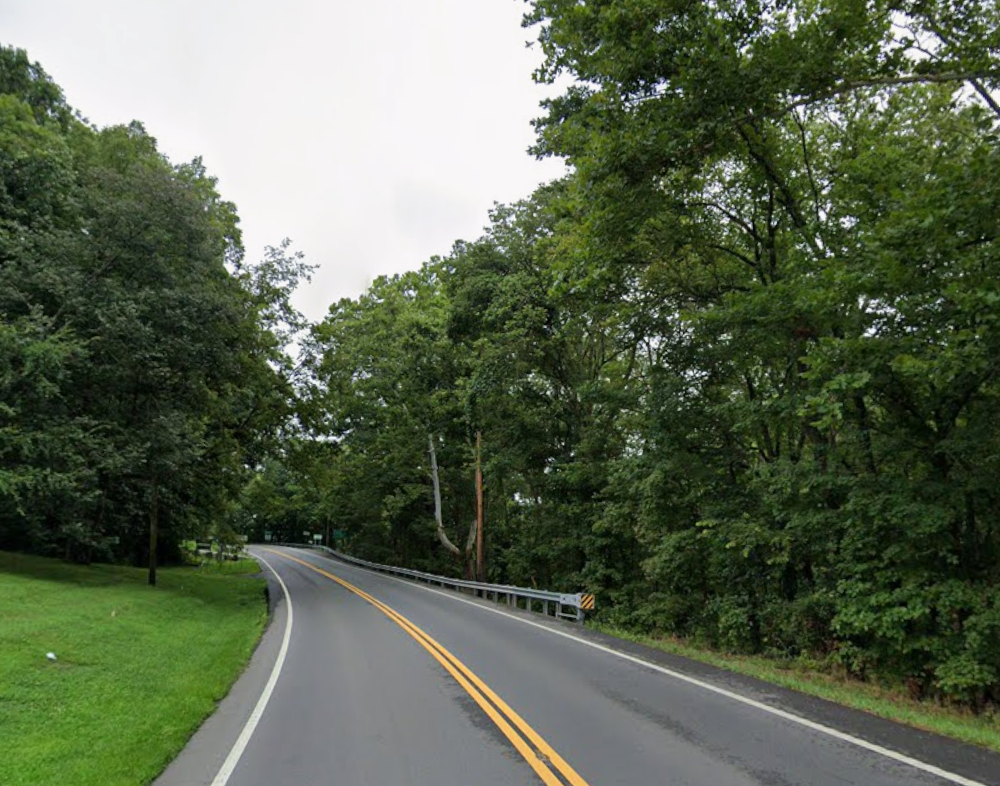
- U.S. Route 70 in Pegram

- Flag Seal
- Motto: "A Community of Neighbors"
- Location of Pegram in Cheatham County, Tennessee.

- Location within Tennessee Location within the United States
- Coordinates: 36°06′02″N 87°03′04″W
- Country: United States
- State: Tennessee
- County: Cheatham

Area
  - Total: 7.25 sq mi (18.77 km^{2})
  - Land: 7.25 sq mi (18.77 km^{2})
  - Water: 0 sq mi (0.00 km^{2})
- Elevation: 551 ft (168 m)

Population (2020)
  - Total: 2,072
  - Density: 285.9/sq mi (110.38/km^{2})
- Time zone: UTC-6 (Central (CST))
  - Summer (DST): UTC-5 (CDT)
- ZIP code: 37143
- Area code(s): 615, 629
- FIPS code: 47-57480
- GNIS feature ID: 1297122
- Website: www.pegram.net

Pegram is a town completely in Cheatham County, Tennessee, United States. As of the 2020 census, the population was 2,072. It was the backdrop in the movie “Ruth and Boaz.”

== Geography ==
According to the United States Census Bureau, the town has a total area of 7.25 square miles (18.8 km^{2}), all of it land.

== Demographics ==
Historical population
Census	Pop.	Note	%±
1980	1,081		—
1990	1,371		26.8%
2000	2,146		56.5%
2010	2,093		−2.5%
2020	2,072		−1.0%

=== 2020 census ===
Pegram racial composition
Race	Number	Percentage
White (non-Hispanic)	1,906	91.99%
Black or African American (non-Hispanic)	44	2.12%
Asian	7	0.34%
Other/Mixed	56	2.7%
Hispanic or Latino	59	2.85%

As of the 2020 United States census, there were 2,072 people, 911 households, and 717 families residing in the town.

=== 2000 census ===
As of the census of 2000, there were 2146 people, 773 households, and 636 families residing in the town. The population density was 269.0 inhabitants per square mile (103.9/km^{2}). There were 801 housing units at an average density of 100.4 per square mile (38.8/km^{2}). The racial makeup of the town was 95.06% White, 3.73% African American, 0.37% Native American, 0.14% Asian, 0.19% from other races, and 0.51% from two or more races. Hispanic or Latino of any race were 1.40% of the population.

There were 773 households, out of which 43.2% had children under the age of 18 living with them, 70.4% were married couples living together, 8.7% had a female householder with no husband present, and 17.7% were non-families. 15.0% of all households were made up of individuals, and 3.9% had someone living alone who was 65 years of age or older. The average household size was 2.74 and the average family size was 3.03.

In the town, the population was spread out, with 28.7% under the age of 18, 5.5% from 18 to 24, 35.8% from 25 to 44, 22.4% from 45 to 64, and 7.6% who were 65 years of age or older. The median age was 36 years. For every 100 females, there were 103.0 males. For every 100 females age 18 and over, there were 98.4 males. The median income for a household in the town was $55,259, and the median income for a family was $69,306. Males had a median income of $40,727 versus $30,268 for females. The per capita income for the town was $22,980. About 4.2% of families and 5.0% of the population were below the poverty line, including 3.7% of those under age 18 and 8.3% of those age 65 or over. It is also located approximately 15 miles from the Capitol Building of Tennessee. The Town of Pegram adjoins the Metropolitan Government of Nashville boundary and is a Chartered Municipality.

== Notable person ==
Horace McCoy, novelist and Hollywood screenwriter whose works include They Shoot Horses, Don't They? was born in Pegram.
