= Pleasant View, Tennessee =

- City
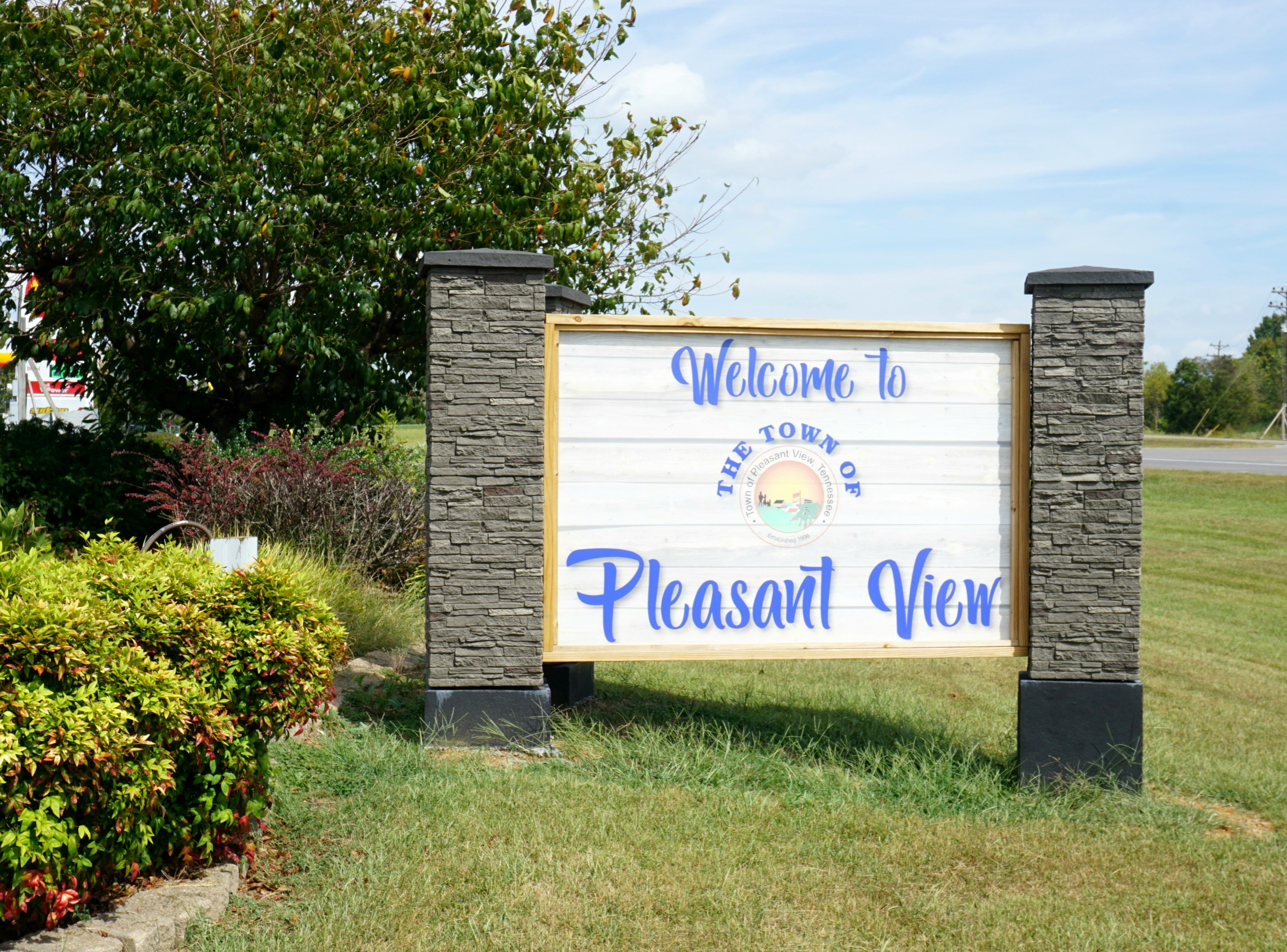
- Pleasant View welcome sign

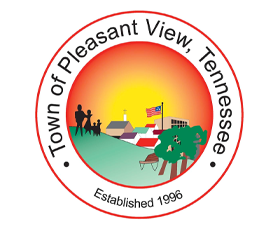
- Flag Seal
- Motto: Away from it all, close to everything
- Location of Pleasant View in Cheatham County, Tennessee.

- Location within Tennessee Location within the United States
- Coordinates: 36°23′39″N 87°02′12″W
- Country: United States
- State: Tennessee
- County: Cheatham
- Incorporated: 1996

Government
  - Type: City council
  - Mayor: Meghan Henderson
  - Vice Mayor: Bruce Drake
  - Chief of Police: Tad Wheeler; Government website (2026)

Area
  - Total: 12.52 sq mi (32.43 km^{2})
  - Land: 12.52 sq mi (32.43 km^{2})
  - Water: 0 sq mi (0.00 km^{2})
- Elevation: 692 ft (211 m)

Population (2020)
  - Total: 4,807 ▲
  - Estimate (2024): 5,629 ▲
  - Density: 383.9/sq mi (148.22/km^{2})
- Time zone: UTC-6 (CST)
  - Summer (DST): UTC-5 (CDT)
- ZIP code: 37146
- Area codes: 615, 629
- FIPS code: 47-59560
- GNIS feature ID: 1297944
- Website: https://townofpleasantview.com/

Pleasant View is a city on the northern border of Cheatham County. Located in Middle Tennessee, it is part of the Nashville-Davidson–Murfreesboro–Franklin, TN Metropolitan Statistical Area. As of the 2024 U.S. Census Bureau estimate, the population was 5,629, an increase from 4,807 in the 2020 census.

Pleasant View is among the most populous communities in Cheatham County and has experienced faster population growth since 2020. As a result, it may have overtaken the county seat, Ashland City, as the most populous community. Ashland City had an estimated population of 5,689 in 2024.

== History ==
In the earlier days, Pleasant View was formerly known as "Bradley's Stand," as well as "Turnbull Horse Stamp." The mail and telegraph lines ran from Clarksville to Nashville, and the Town of Pleasant View served as stagecoach stop and rest area between the two cities.

The town was named Pleasant View by a group of citizens in 1870. The first post office began in 1880.

Pleasant View was incorporated under a house bill in 1921 and consisted of approximately 105 acres. At the time, the local government consisted of a mayor and six aldermen and was divided into three wards. The town was unincorporated ten years later. In 1996, when the citizens of Pleasant View voted to re-incorporate under a public act mayor/Aldermanic Charter.

The population of Pleasant View at the time of the incorporation was approximately 2,150. Initially, the town of Pleasant View was governed by a mayor and two aldermen. David Davis served as Mayor from October 10, 1996, until December 1998. Morris Bidwell served as Vice-Mayor, Alderman, and Don Worrell served as Alderman.

In 1998, the town voted to increase the number of Aldermen to serve on the Board to four (with one being the vice mayor). Pleasant View City Hall is currently located at 1008 Civic Court.

== Geography ==
Interactive map of Pleasant View

According to the United States Census Bureau, the city has a total area of 12.6 square miles (33 km^{2}), all land.

The town is bounded on the North by the Robertson/Cheatham county line. The Eastern boundary goes from Goodsprings Road to Triangle Road, the Southern Boundary goes along Old Clarksville Pike from Triangle Road to Oaklawn Road, and the Western boundary goes along Oaklawn Road back to the Robertson/Cheatham County line.

Pleasant View maintains around 55 city streets (about 24 miles (39 km)).

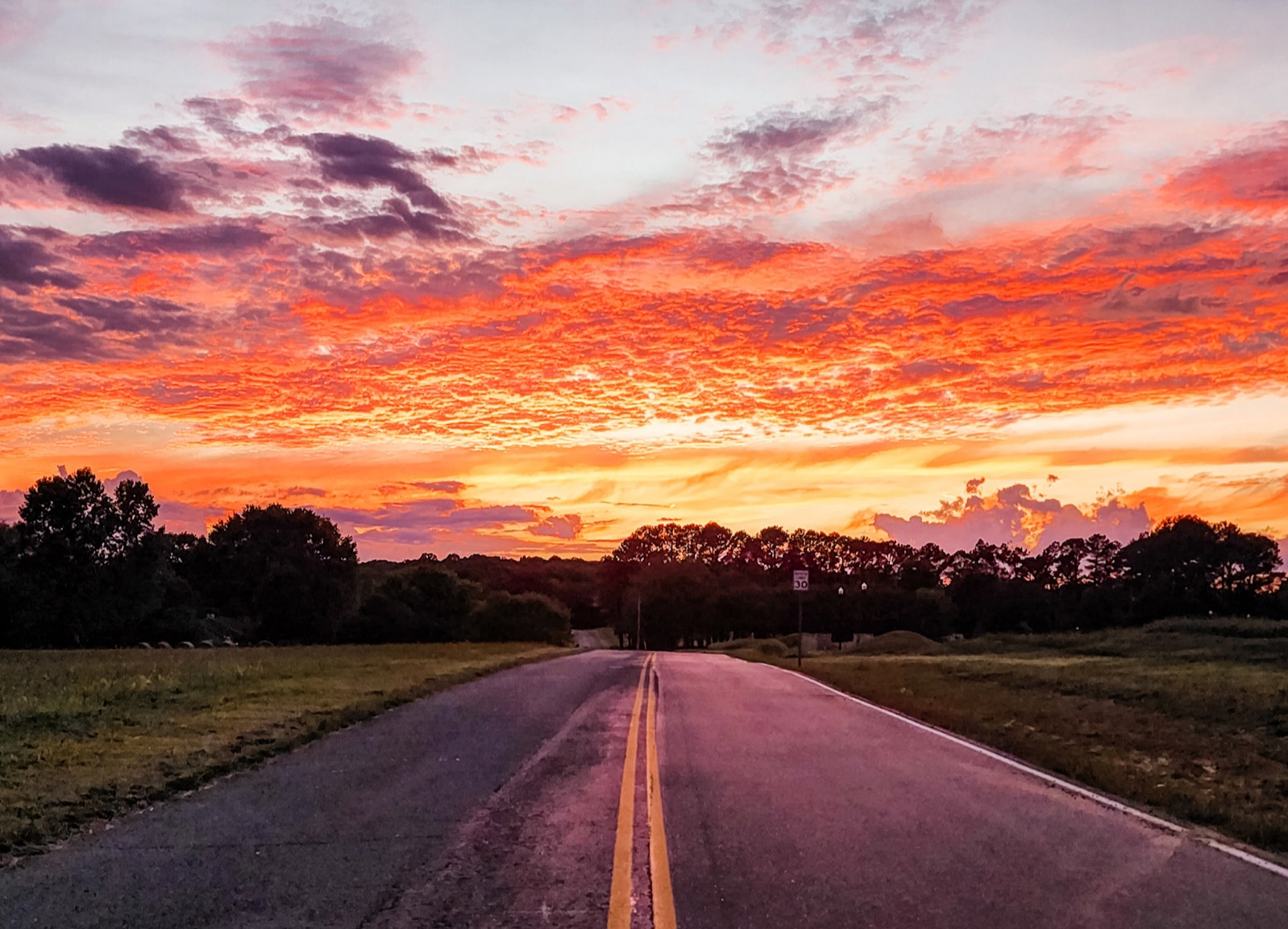
Sunset on a rural Pleasant View road

== Demographics ==
Historical population
Census	Pop.	Note	%±
1930	177		—
2000	2,934		—
2010	4,149		41.4%
2020	4,807		15.9%
2024 (est.)	5,629		17.1%

=== Racial and ethnic composition ===
Racial composition as of the 2020 census
Race	Number	Percent
White	4,294	89.3%
Black or African American	116	2.4%
American Indian and Alaska Native	15	0.3%
Asian	47	1.0%
Native Hawaiian and Other Pacific Islander	4	0.1%
Some other race	64	1.3%
Two or more races	267	5.6%
Hispanic or Latino (of any race)	207	4.3%

=== 2020 census ===
As of the 2020 census, Pleasant View had a population of 4,807, with 1,810 households and 1,269 families residing in the city. The median age was 38.9 years. 23.6% of residents were under the age of 18 and 12.9% of residents were 65 years of age or older. For every 100 females there were 94.4 males, and for every 100 females age 18 and over there were 92.1 males age 18 and over.

The 2020 census reported that 0.0% of residents lived in urban areas, while 100.0% lived in rural areas.

There were 1,810 households in Pleasant View, of which 35.6% had children under the age of 18 living in them. Of all households, 59.8% were married-couple households, 11.9% were households with a male householder and no spouse or partner present, and 21.8% were households with a female householder and no spouse or partner present. About 19.4% of all households were made up of individuals and 7.5% had someone living alone who was 65 years of age or older.

There were 1,927 housing units, of which 6.1% were vacant. The homeowner vacancy rate was 2.6% and the rental vacancy rate was 8.8%.

=== 2010 census ===
As of the census of 2010, there was a population of 4,149, with 1,005 households and 843 families residing in the city. The population density was 233.6 inhabitants per square mile (90.2/km^{2}). There were 1,537 housing units at an average density of 83.1 per square mile (32.1/km^{2}). The racial makeup of the city was 97.85% White, 0.41% African American, 0.20% Native American, 0.10% Asian, 0.20% from other races, and 1.23% from two or more races. Hispanic or Latino of any race were 0.78% of the population.

There were 1,005 households, out of which 48.9% had children under the age of 18 living with them, 71.3% were married couples living together, 9.5% had a female householder with no husband present, and 16.1% were non-families. 13.7% of all households were made up of individuals, and 4.6% had someone living alone who was 65 years of age or older. The average household size was 2.91, and the average family size was 3.19.

In the city, the population was spread out, with 31.6% under the age of 18, 6.2% from 18 to 24, 36.4% from 25 to 44, 19.1% from 45 to 64, and 6.8% who were 65 years of age or older. The median age was 33 years. For every 100 females, there were 101.2 males. For every 100 females age 18 and over, there were 97.3 males.

The median income for a household in the city was $54,236, and the median income for a family was $60,543. Males had a median income of $40,490 versus $27,672 for females. The per capita income for the city was $19,236. About 2.8% of families and 4.9% of the population were below the poverty line, including 3.0% of those under age 18 and 13.4% of those age 65 or over.

2010 Census Pleasant View urban cluster map

== Attractions ==
=== Commercial developments ===
Pleasant View Village is a mixed-use area in Pleasant View that combines businesses with a residential neighborhood. It includes restaurants, physicians' offices, a liquor store, an optometrist, a chiropractic office, and a preschool.

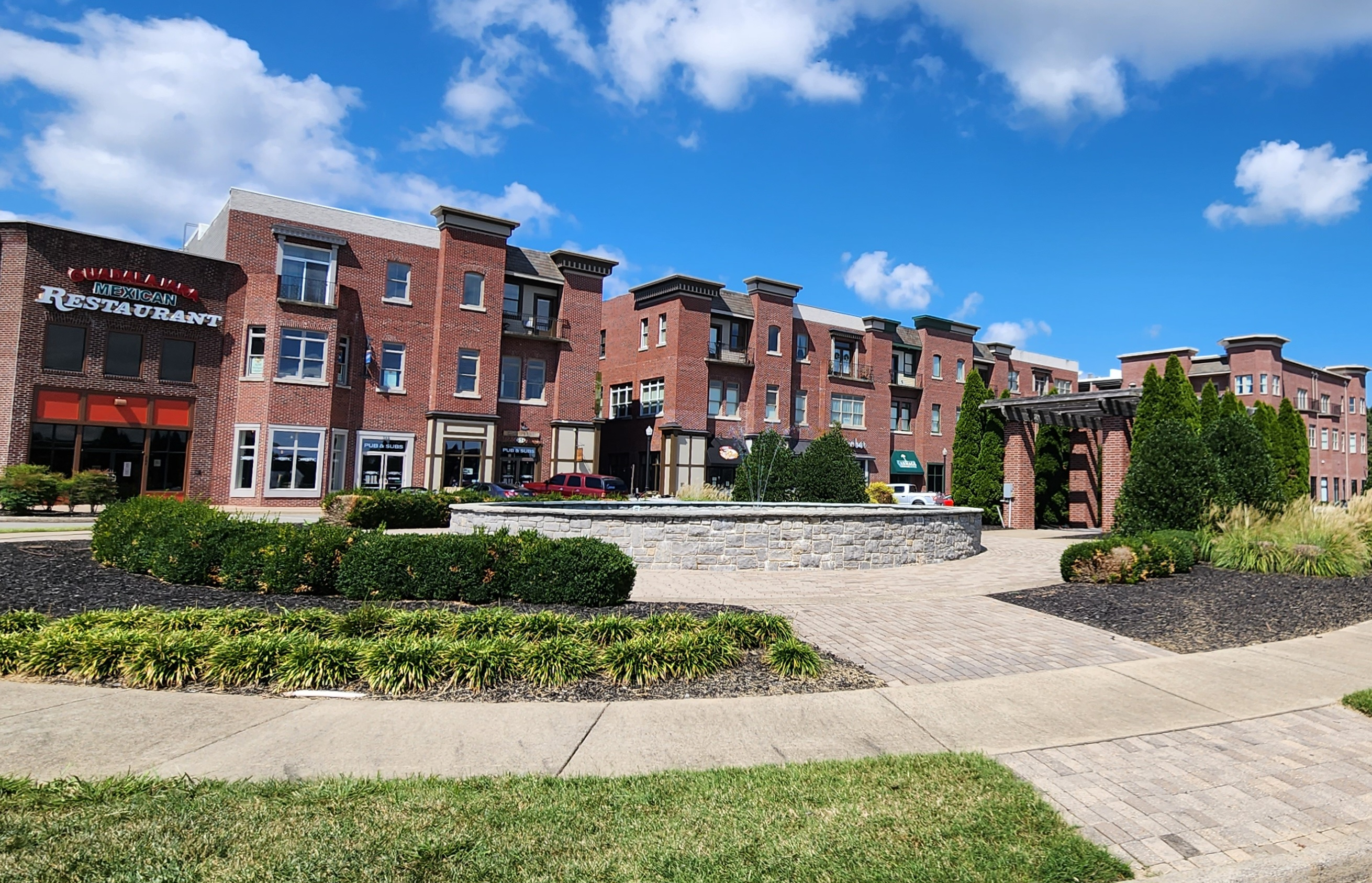
Village Square in 2023

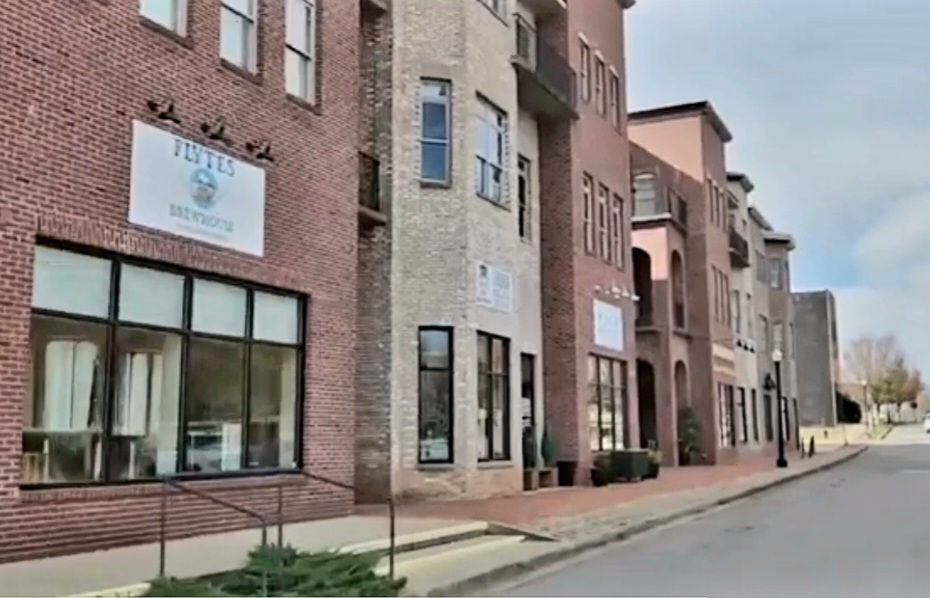
Village business on Centre St.

In 2025, convenience store chain Wawa announced plans to expand into the Middle Tennessee. Construction was reported to be beginning on a future Wawa convenience store and gas station site in Pleasant View, with plans of it opening in the summer of 2026.

=== Parks ===
Pleasant View Community Park is a public park located on Pleasant View Road. It has walking trails, sports fields and courts, playgrounds, picnic areas, and open green space.

Balthrop Park is a public park located across from Pleasant View Elementary School. It has a baseball/softball field, playground, pavilion, and picnic facilities.

== Government ==
Pleasant View operates under a mayor-aldermanic form of government, featuring a five-member board of mayor and aldermen (one which is vice mayor) that serves as the legislative body responsible for local ordinances, budgeting, and policy-making. The council holds regular meetings on the second Monday of each month at 7:00 p.m. in city hall. As of 2026, the mayor is Meghan Henderson, who was elected as the first female mayor of Pleasant View. The aldermen are Bruce Drake, H.T. Wilson, and Heather Brown Hardwick. Tad Wheeler serves as chief of police.

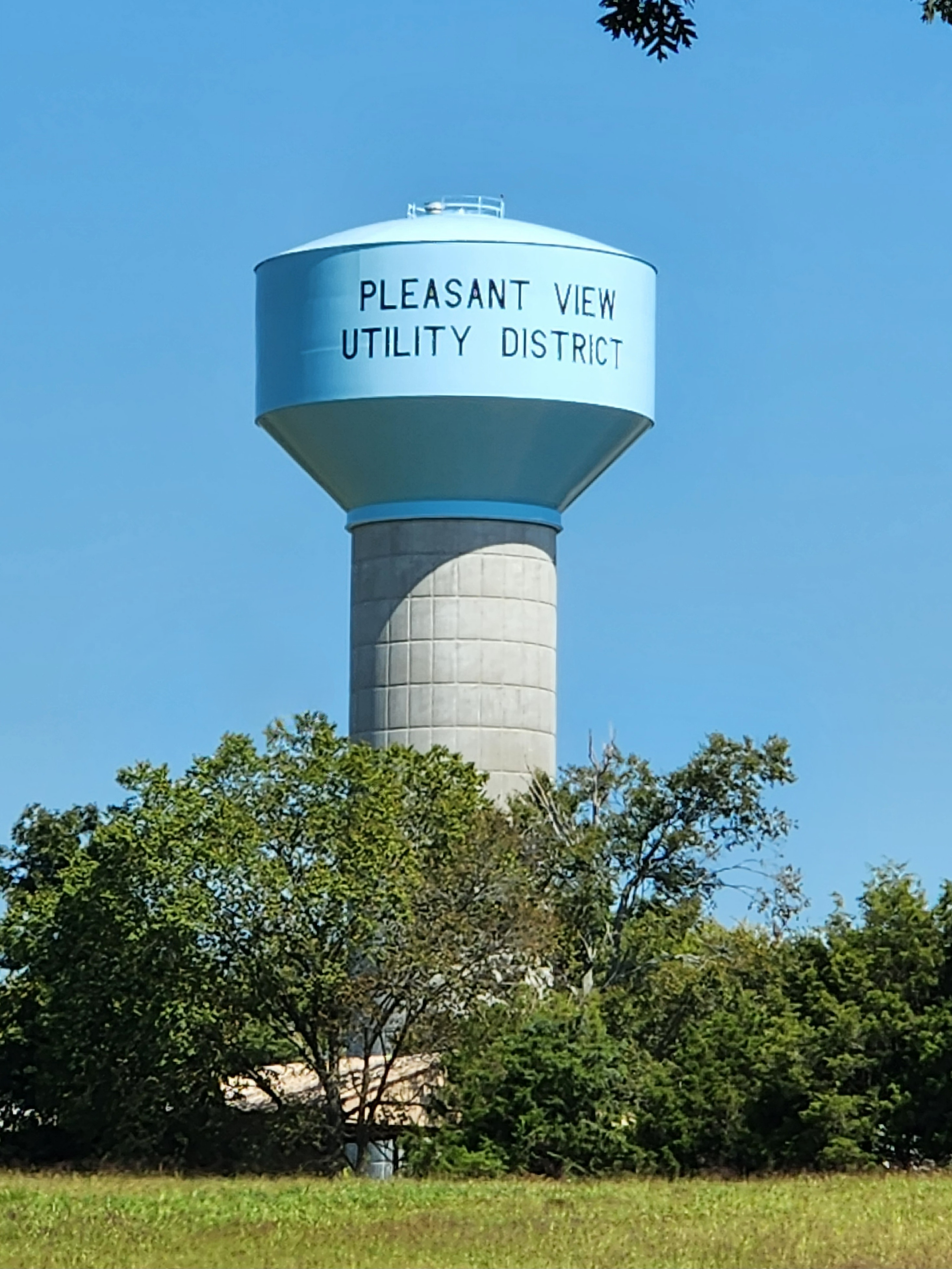
Pleasant View water tower

== Education ==
Schools in Pleasant View include:

- Sycamore High School
- Sycamore Middle School
- Pleasant View Elementary School
- Pleasant View Christian School

== Notable people ==
- Perry Keenan, former mayor of Pleasant View.
