= Ashland City, Tennessee =

- City
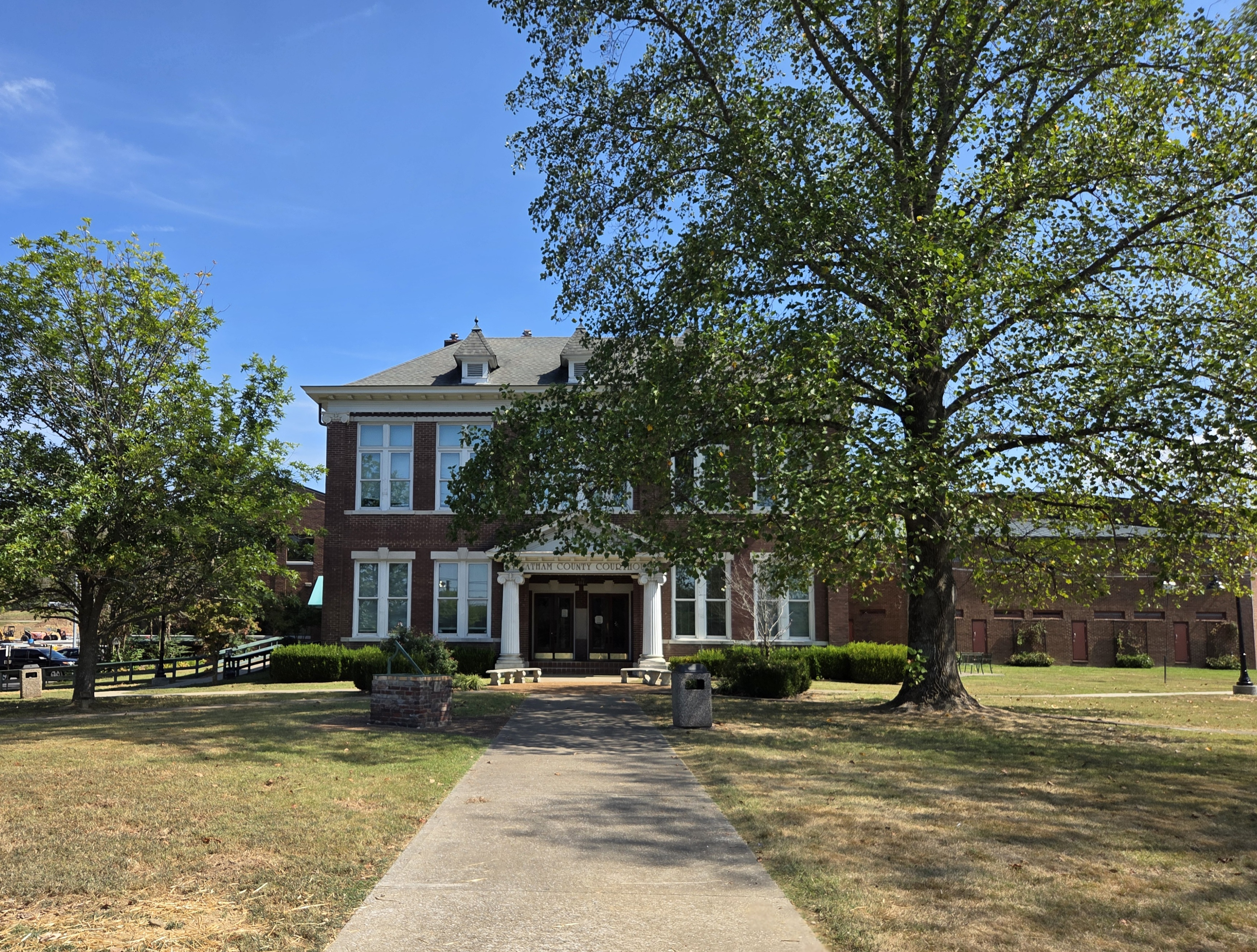
- Cheatham County Courthouse in Ashland City

- Location of Ashland City in Cheatham County, Tennessee

- Location within Tennessee Location within the United States
- Coordinates: 36°16′27″N 87°03′51″W
- Country: United States
- State: Tennessee
- County: Cheatham
- Founded: 1856
- Incorporated: 1859

Government
  - Mayor: Gerald C. Greer

Area
  - Total: 11.41 sq mi (29.56 km^{2})
  - Land: 10.67 sq mi (27.63 km^{2})
  - Water: 0.75 sq mi (1.93 km^{2})
- Elevation: 430 ft (130 m)

Population (2020)
  - Total: 5,193
  - Estimate (2024): 5,689 ▲
  - Density: 486.8/sq mi (187.95/km^{2})
- Time zone: UTC-6 (Central (CST))
  - Summer (DST): UTC-5 (CDT)
- ZIP code: 37015
- Area codes: 615, 629
- FIPS code: 47-02180
- GNIS feature ID: 1304885
- Website: www.ashlandcitytn.gov

Ashland City is a City and the county seat of Cheatham County, Tennessee. Located in Middle Tennessee, it is part of the Nashville-Davidson–Murfreesboro–Franklin, TN Metropolitan Statistical Area. As of the 2024 U.S. Census Bureau estimate, the population was 5,689, an increase from 5,193 in the 2020 census.

== History ==
Ashland City was created in 1856 as a county seat for the newly established Cheatham County. The county's commissioners purchased the initial 50 acres (0.20 km^{2}) of land (now the courthouse square) from James Lenox, and a temporary courthouse was erected shortly thereafter. The temporary structure was replaced by the present courthouse in 1869. Ashland City was officially incorporated in 1859.

The first major industry in the Ashland City area was a forge operated by Montgomery Bell at the Narrows of the Harpeth, several miles to the southwest, which was established in 1818. In 1835, Samuel Watson established a gristmill and powder mill along Sycamore Creek, just north of Ashland City. Watson's mill developed into one of the largest powder mills in the South, making it a target during the Civil War. The mill continued in operation under various owners until 1904.

The city was either named after Henry Clay's estate Ashland or by an act of the General Assembly of Tennessee in 1859, when the city was incorporated, who were inspired by the ash trees in the area. Originally called Ashland, "City" was added to the name after the incorporation.

== Geography ==
Interactive map of Ashland City

Ashland City is located near the center of Cheatham County in a bottomland along the northeast bank of the Cumberland River, a few miles upstream from the river's confluence with the Harpeth River. The Cheatham State Wildlife Management Area covers most of the hilly area on the opposite side of the Cumberland.

Ashland City is centered on the junction of Tennessee State Route 12, which connects the town with Nashville to the southeast and Clarksville to the northwest, and Tennessee State Route 49, which connects the city to Springfield and Kentucky to the northeast and Charlotte to the west.

According to the United States Census Bureau in 2010, the town has a total area of 10.8 square miles (28.1 km^{2}), including 26.2 square kilometres (10.1 sq mi) of land and 0.77 square miles (2.0 km^{2}), or 6.95%, water.

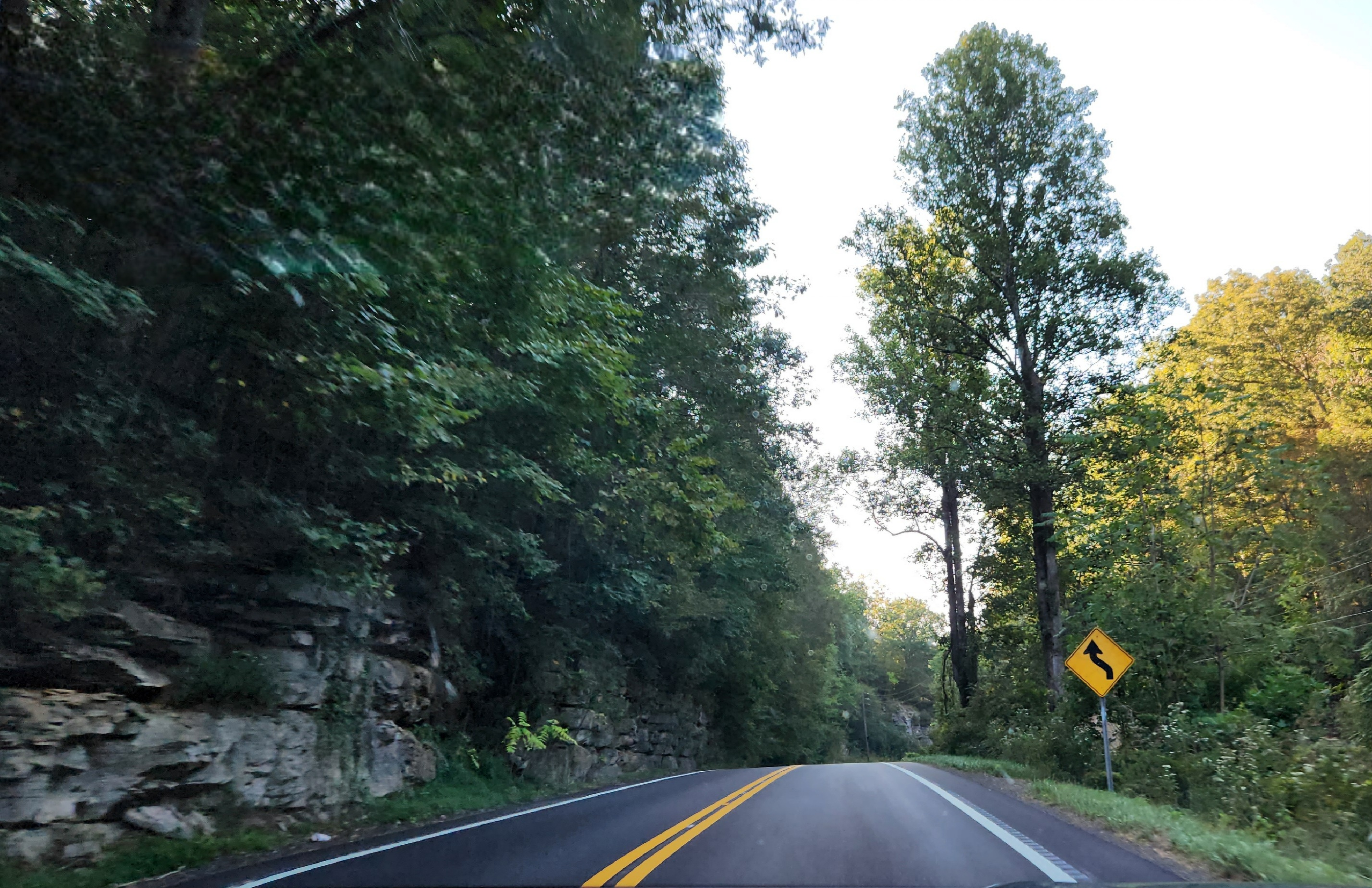
State Route 49 in Ashland City

=== Landmarks ===
Sydney's Bluff, located on the opposite bank of the Cumberland River, is visible from most parts of the city, especially from the residential districts which are built on hills rising to the north of the river flood plain. This jagged cliff system, which was carved by the Cumberland River, is popular with local rock climbers and hikers. The bluff was supposedly named after a girl who fell from the bluff while trying to escape hostile Native Americans in the early 19th century.

Cheatham Lake is a large recreational area that extends up the Cumberland River past Ashland City and is operated by the US Army Corps of Engineers. The lake area, formed by Cheatham Lock and Dam 11 miles (18 km) to the northwest of the town, offers many outdoor experiences such as camping, fishing, wildlife viewing, water sports, swimming, and multiple children's play areas. Cheatham Lake is a popular rustic weekend getaway for many surrounding areas.

== Demographics ==
Historical population
Census	Pop.	Note	%±
1870	121		—
1880	170		40.5%
1890	358		110.6%
1910	641		—
1920	649		1.2%
1930	712		9.7%
1940	957		34.4%
1950	1,024		7.0%
1960	1,400		36.7%
1970	2,027		44.8%
1980	2,329		14.9%
1990	2,552		9.6%
2000	3,641		42.7%
2010	4,541		24.7%
2020	5,193		14.4%
2024 (est.)	5,689	▲	9.6%

=== 2020 census ===
Ashland City racial composition
Race	Number	Percentage
White (non-Hispanic)	4,175	80.4%
Black or African American (non-Hispanic)	309	5.95%
Native American	10	0.19%
Asian	32	0.62%
Pacific Islander	11	0.21%
Other/Mixed	230	4.43%
Hispanic or Latino	426	8.2%

As of the 2020 United States census, there were 5,193 people, 1,986 households, and 1,129 families residing in the town.

=== 2000 census ===
As of the census of 2000, there were 3,641 people, 1,416 households, and 944 families residing in the town. The population density was 410.8 inhabitants per square mile (158.6/km^{2}). There were 1,508 housing units at an average density of 170.2 units per square mile (65.7 units/km^{2}). The racial makeup of the town was 94.04% White, 3.74% African American, 0.27% Native American, 0.25% Asian, 1.04% from other races, and 0.66% from two or more races. Hispanic or Latino people of any race were 2.03% of the population.

There were 1,416 households, out of which 33.3% had children under the age of 18 living with them, 47.3% were married couples living together, 14.4% had a female householder with no husband present, and 33.3% were non-families. 27.6% of all households were made up of individuals, and 11.3% had someone living alone who was 65 years of age or older. The average household size was 2.44, and the average family size was 2.96.

In the town, the population was spread out, with 25.1% under the age of 18, 9.6% from 18 to 24, 32.7% from 25 to 44, 19.4% from 45 to 64, and 13.1% who were 65 years of age or older. The median age was 34 years. For every 100 females, there were 95.9 males. For every 100 females age 18 and over, there were 93.6 males.

The median income for a household in the town was $35,282, and the median income for a family was $39,550. Males had a median income of $29,694 versus $22,454 for females. The per capita income for the town was $17,228. About 5.5% of families and 9.4% of the population were below the poverty line, including 10.3% of those under age 18 and 12.6% of those age 65 or over.

== Economy ==
The largest manufacturing operation in Ashland City is A. O. Smith (State Industries until 2001), which fabricates water heaters. The city limits were recently extended southeast along State Highway 12 to the Davidson County line. This expansion incorporated the Cheatham County Industrial Park, which includes Caymas Boats (across from the former Triton Boats plant) as well as barge building operations, paper products, and concrete manufacturers along the Cumberland River. Ashland City industry is served by the Nashville & Western Railroad (which is a division of the Nashville and Eastern Railroad corporation).

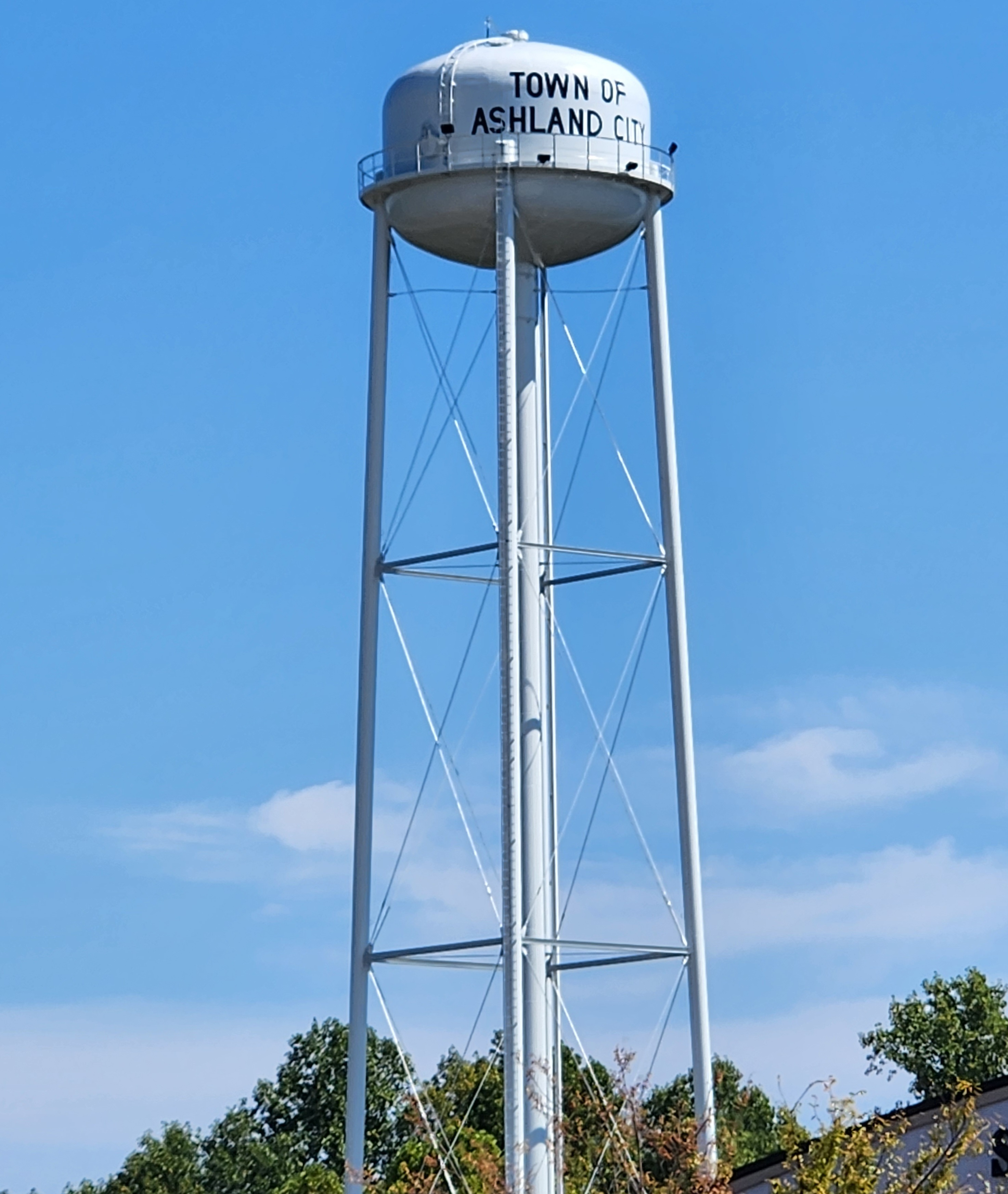
Ashland City water tower

== Government ==
The mayor of Ashland City, Gerald C. Greer, leads the city government with a 6-member council consisting of 2 council members from each ward, elected at large to serve a term of 4 years. The term date for Mayor Greer is August 2028.

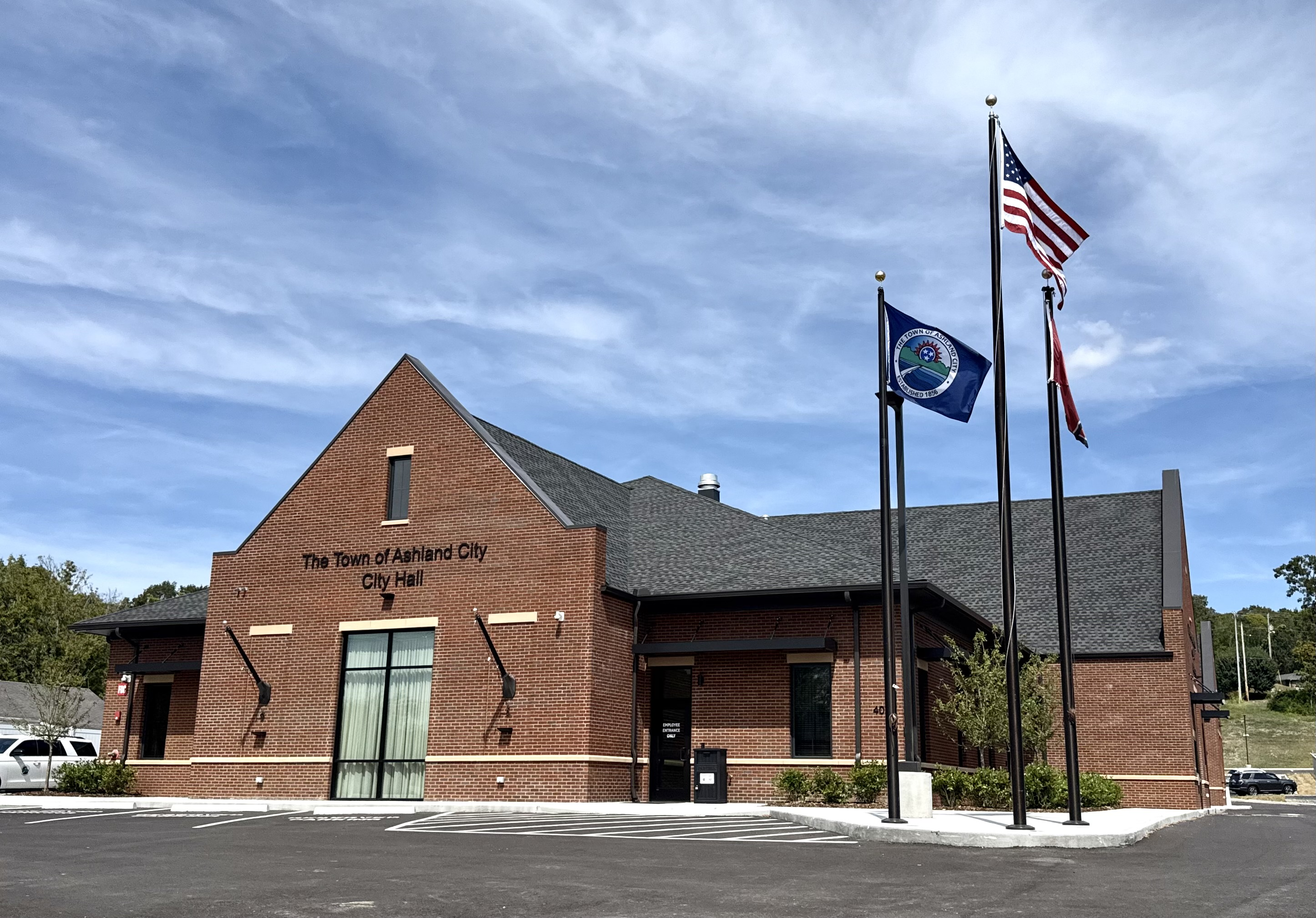
City Hall

== Education ==
Schools in Ashland City include:

- Cheatham County Central High School
- Cheatham Middle School
- Ashland City Elementary STEM Academy
- Riverside Academy
