= Kingston Springs, Tennessee =

- Town
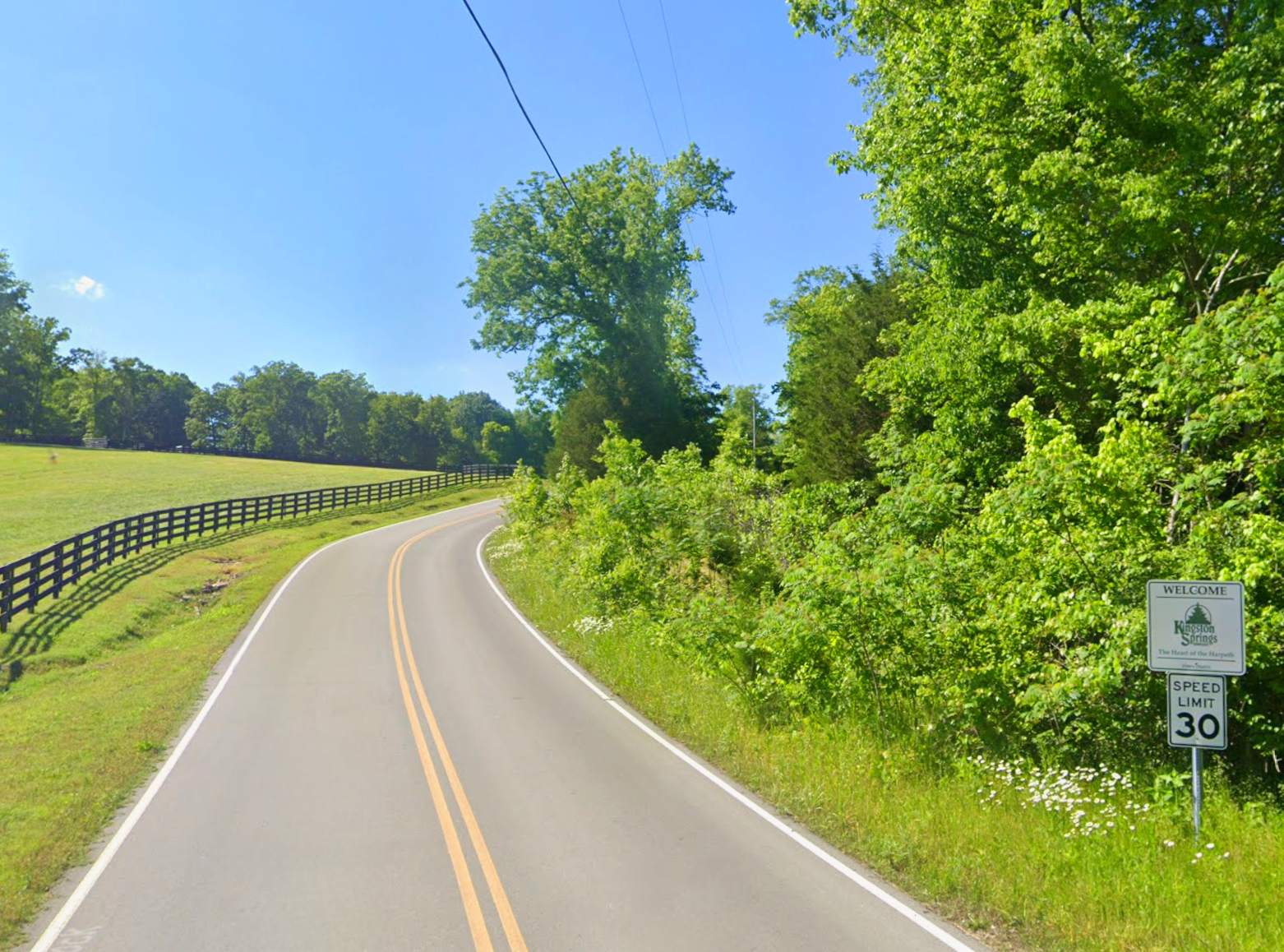
- Rural road in Kingston Springs

- Location of Kingston Springs in Cheatham County, Tennessee.

- Location within Tennessee Location within the United States
- Coordinates: 36°06′07″N 87°06′54″W
- Country: United States
- State: Tennessee
- County: Cheatham
- Incorporated: 1965

Area
  - Total: 10.05 sq mi (26.04 km^{2})
  - Land: 10.05 sq mi (26.04 km^{2})
  - Water: 0.0039 sq mi (0.01 km^{2})
- Elevation: 522 ft (159 m)

Population (2020)
  - Total: 2,824
  - Density: 280.9/sq mi (108.46/km^{2})
- Time zone: UTC-6 (Central (CST))
  - Summer (DST): UTC-5 (CDT)
- ZIP code: 37082
- Area code(s): 615, 629
- FIPS code: 47-39660
- GNIS feature ID: 1290262
- Website: kingstonsprings.net

Kingston Springs is a town in Cheatham County, Tennessee, United States. As of the 2020 census, the population was 2,824.

The Golf Club of Tennessee is located in Kingston springs and is one of the most exclusive private golf clubs in Tennessee. Designed by Tom Fazio and opened in 1991 on 317 acres, the club features a championship 18‑hole course and has been ranked among the top courses in the state. It has hosted notable events, including the 2018 U.S. Women’s Amateur Championship and multiple regional tournaments.

== History ==
The area around Kingston Springs was inhabited by Indigenous peoples for thousands of years before European settlement, with early settlers drawn by the Harpeth River and local sulfur springs. The first known white settler, Lewis Dunn, received a land grant for his service in the Revolutionary War and established his family near the river in 1807. A large hotel and tavern was built in 1819 near mineral springs to serve visitors seeking the purported therapeutic qualities of the water, helping establish the community as a resort destination. The town was formally incorporated in 1965 with a population of 290, and municipal sewer service was added in 1989, spurring residential growth and development.

The Kingston Springs Hotel and Buildings, is a resort complex originally built in 1849 by Emanuel Kreider and rebuilt in the 1890s by Matt F. Allen after a fire destroyed the first structure. Thirteen cottages dating back to the 1860s also survive on the property, reflecting the town’s late‑19th‑century role as a health and leisure destination. The complex was added to the National Register of Historic Places on October 31, 1979.

== Geography ==
According to the United States Census Bureau, the town has a total area of 10.05 square miles (26.0 km^{2}).

=== Climate ===
Climate data for Kingston Springs, Tennessee (1991–2020 normals, extremes 1962–present)
Month	Jan	Feb	Mar	Apr	May	Jun	Jul	Aug	Sep	Oct	Nov	Dec	Year
Record high °F (°C)	78 (26)	84 (29)	89 (32)	91 (33)	95 (35)	109 (43)	107 (42)	108 (42)	104 (40)	98 (37)	94 (34)	78 (26)	109 (43)
Mean daily maximum °F (°C)	49.5 (9.7)	53.9 (12.2)	63.4 (17.4)	73.3 (22.9)	80.7 (27.1)	87.6 (30.9)	90.8 (32.7)	90.7 (32.6)	85.2 (29.6)	74.7 (23.7)	62.6 (17.0)	52.6 (11.4)	72.1 (22.3)
Daily mean °F (°C)	38.1 (3.4)	41.4 (5.2)	49.6 (9.8)	58.8 (14.9)	67.4 (19.7)	75.3 (24.1)	79.0 (26.1)	78.0 (25.6)	71.5 (21.9)	59.9 (15.5)	48.7 (9.3)	40.9 (4.9)	59.0 (15.0)
Mean daily minimum °F (°C)	26.7 (−2.9)	28.8 (−1.8)	35.8 (2.1)	44.2 (6.8)	54.2 (12.3)	63.0 (17.2)	67.2 (19.6)	65.4 (18.6)	57.8 (14.3)	45.0 (7.2)	34.8 (1.6)	29.3 (−1.5)	46.0 (7.8)
Record low °F (°C)	−30 (−34)	−9 (−23)	2 (−17)	20 (−7)	29 (−2)	37 (3)	47 (8)	43 (6)	32 (0)	20 (−7)	5 (−15)	−18 (−28)	−30 (−34)
Average precipitation inches (mm)	3.91 (99)	4.19 (106)	4.84 (123)	4.77 (121)	5.43 (138)	3.97 (101)	4.36 (111)	3.32 (84)	3.92 (100)	3.43 (87)	3.61 (92)	4.80 (122)	50.55 (1,284)
Average snowfall inches (cm)	0.2 (0.51)	0.8 (2.0)	0.0 (0.0)	0.0 (0.0)	0.0 (0.0)	0.0 (0.0)	0.0 (0.0)	0.0 (0.0)	0.0 (0.0)	0.0 (0.0)	0.0 (0.0)	0.4 (1.0)	1.4 (3.6)
Average precipitation days (≥ 0.01 in)	11.0	11.1	11.9	11.3	12.1	9.9	10.7	8.3	8.2	8.9	10.0	12.0	125.4
Average snowy days (≥ 0.1 in)	0.4	1.4	0.2	0.0	0.0	0.0	0.0	0.0	0.0	0.0	0.0	0.2	2.2
Source: NOAA

== Demographics ==
Historical population
Census	Pop.	Note	%±
1970	312		—
1980	1,017		226.0%
1990	1,529		50.3%
2000	2,773		81.4%
2010	2,756		−0.6%
2020	2,824		2.5%

=== 2020 census ===
Kingston Springs racial composition
Race	Number	Percentage
White (non-Hispanic)	2,514	89.02%
Black or African American (non-Hispanic)	27	0.96%
Native American	5	0.18%
Asian	9	0.32%
Other/Mixed	106	3.75%
Hispanic or Latino	163	5.77%

As of the 2020 United States census, there were 2,824 people, 1,013 households, and 772 families residing in the town.

=== 2000 census ===
In the 2000 United States census, there were 2,773 people, 983 households, and 809 families in the town. The population density was 283.7 inhabitants per square mile (109.5/km^{2}). There were 1,015 housing units, at an average density of 103.9 per square mile (40.1/km^{2}). The racial composition of the town was 97.44% White, 0.87% African American, 0.36% Native American, 0.54% Asian, 0.40% from other races, and 0.40% from two or more races. Hispanic or Latino of any race were 0.54%

Of the 983 households, 43.0% had children under the age of 18 living with them, 69.1% were married couples living together, 8.9% had a female householder with no husband present, and 17.7% were non-families. 13.0% of households were one person and 3.2% were one person aged 65 or older. The average household size was 2.82 and the average family size was 3.10.

The age distribution was 28.5% under the age of 18, 6.9% from 18 to 24, 33.1% from 25 to 44, 25.5% from 45 to 64, and 6.0% 65 or older. The median age was 37 years. For every 100 females, there were 98.8 males. For every 100 females who were 18 and over, there were 94.5 males.

The median household income was $58,490, and the median family income was $60,125. Males had a median income of $41,543 and females had $30,650. The per capita income for the town was $24,519, and about 5.9% of families and 8.4% of the population were below the poverty line, including 12.0% of those under age 18 and 7.4% of those age 65 or over.

== Government ==
Kingston Springs is governed by a city commission. The board of commissioners are elected and the commissioners pick amongst themselves for the seats of Mayor and Vice Mayor. As of 2025, the non-mayoral city commissioners were Keith Allgood, Michael Coldwell, and Bob Stohler. Todd Verhoven serves as the mayor, and Mike Hargis is the vice-mayor.

== Notable people ==
- Jake Owen, country music artist and songwriter, known for hits such as "Barefoot Blue Jean Night" and "She Gets What She Wants"
- George Kittle, Professional NFL tight end for the San Francisco 49ers who owns a large property and retreat in Kingston Springs
- Craig Morgan, born in Kingston Springs, Tennessee
