= Special routes of U.S. Route 70 =

Special routes of U.S. Route 70

Highway system
- United States Numbered Highway System; List; Special; Divided

Several special routes of U.S. Route 70 exist. In order from west to east, these special routes are as follows.

== New Mexico ==
=== Alamogordo business loop ===
U.S. Highway 70 Business
- Location: Alamogordo, New Mexico

== Oklahoma ==
=== Durant bypass ===
U.S. Highway 70 Bypass
- Location: Durant, Oklahoma

=== Idabel bypass ===
U.S. Highway 70 Bypass
- Location: Idabel, Oklahoma

== Arkansas ==
=== De Queen business route ===
U.S. Highway 70B
- Location: De Queen, Arkansas
- Length: 3.93 mi (6.32 km)
- Existed: 1964–present

U.S. Route 70 Business (US 70B and Hwy. 70B) is a 3.93-mile (6.32 km) business route of U.S. Route 70 in Sevier County, Arkansas. On May 23, 2017, AASHTO received and approved recognition of the business route.

Major intersections

The entire route is in Sevier County.

Location	mi	km	Destinations	Notes
	0.000	0.000	US 70 – Glenwood, Broken Bow, OK	Western terminus
De Queen	1.3	2.1	AR 399 north (Treating Plant Road)	Southern terminus of AR 339
De Queen	3.4	5.5	AR 41 south (Lakeside Drive) / AR 329 south (Stilwell Avenue)	Northern termini of AR 41 and AR 329
De Queen	3.93	6.32	US 59 / US 71 / US 70 / US 371 south – Fort Smith, Texarkana, Hot Springs, Hugo, OK, Cossatot Community College of UA	Eastern terminus; northern terminus of US 371
1.000 mi = 1.609 km; 1.000 km = 0.621 mi

=== Glenwood business route ===
U.S. Highway 70B
- Location: Glenwood, Arkansas
- Length: 0.93 mi (1,500 m)
- Existed: August 2, 1962–present

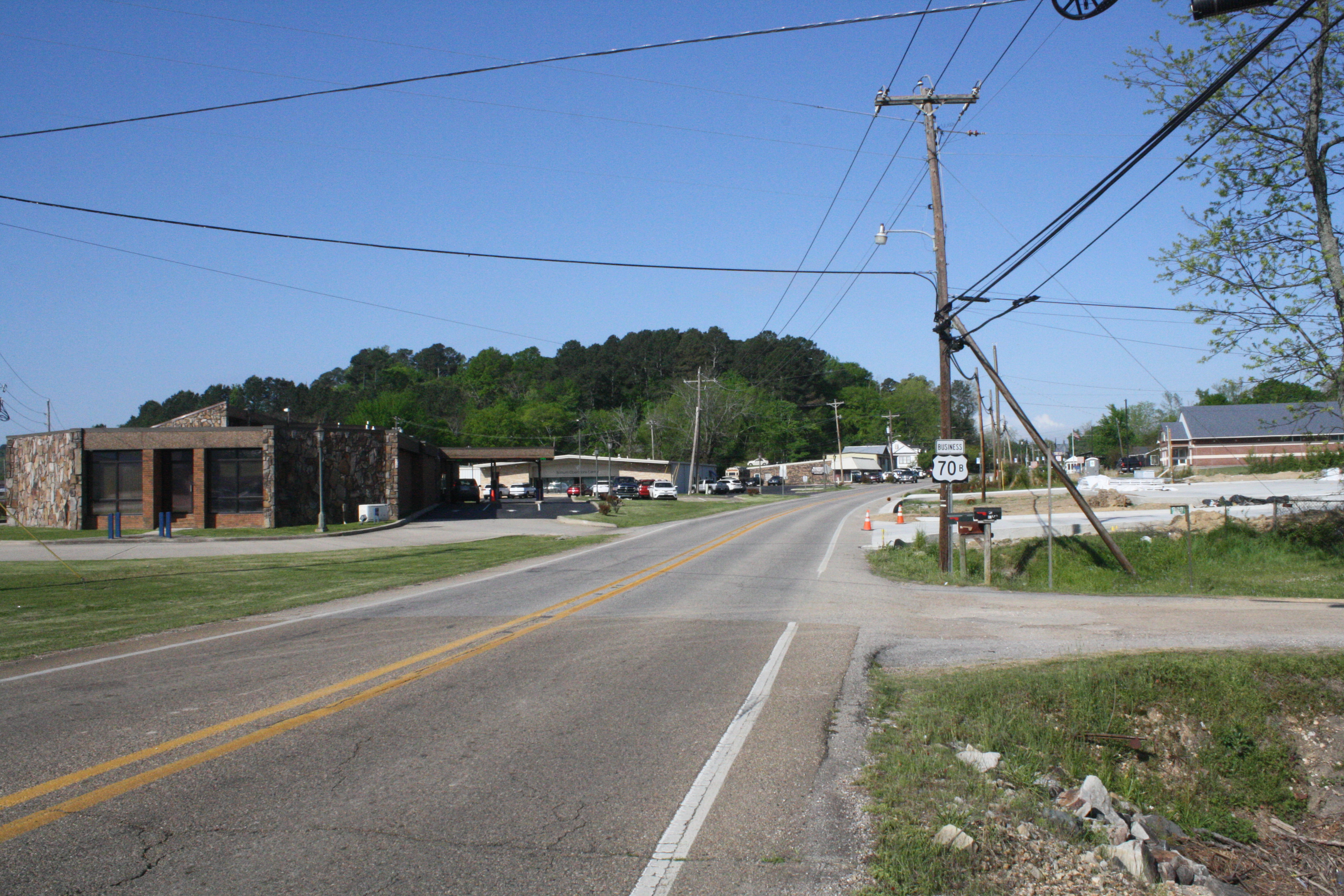
US 70B in Glenwood

U.S. Route 70 Business (US 70B or Hwy. 70B) is a 0.93-mile (1.50 km) business route of U.S. Route 70, along East Broadway, in Glenwood, Arkansas. The route begins at Highway 8 in Glenwood, where it runs through the downtown business district before running northeast and then due east, ending at US 70. The route was created by the Arkansas State Highway Commission (ASHC) on August 2, 1962, following construction of a US 70 bypass around town to the south. On May 23, 2017, AASHTO received and approved recognition of the business route.

Major intersections

The entire route is in Glenwood, Pike County.

mi	km	Destinations	Notes
0.93	1.50	AR 8	Western terminus
0.00	0.00	US 70	Eastern terminus
1.000 mi = 1.609 km; 1.000 km = 0.621 mi

=== Hot Springs business loop ===
U.S. Highway 70B
- Location: Hot Springs, Arkansas
- Length: 10.05 mi (16.17 km)

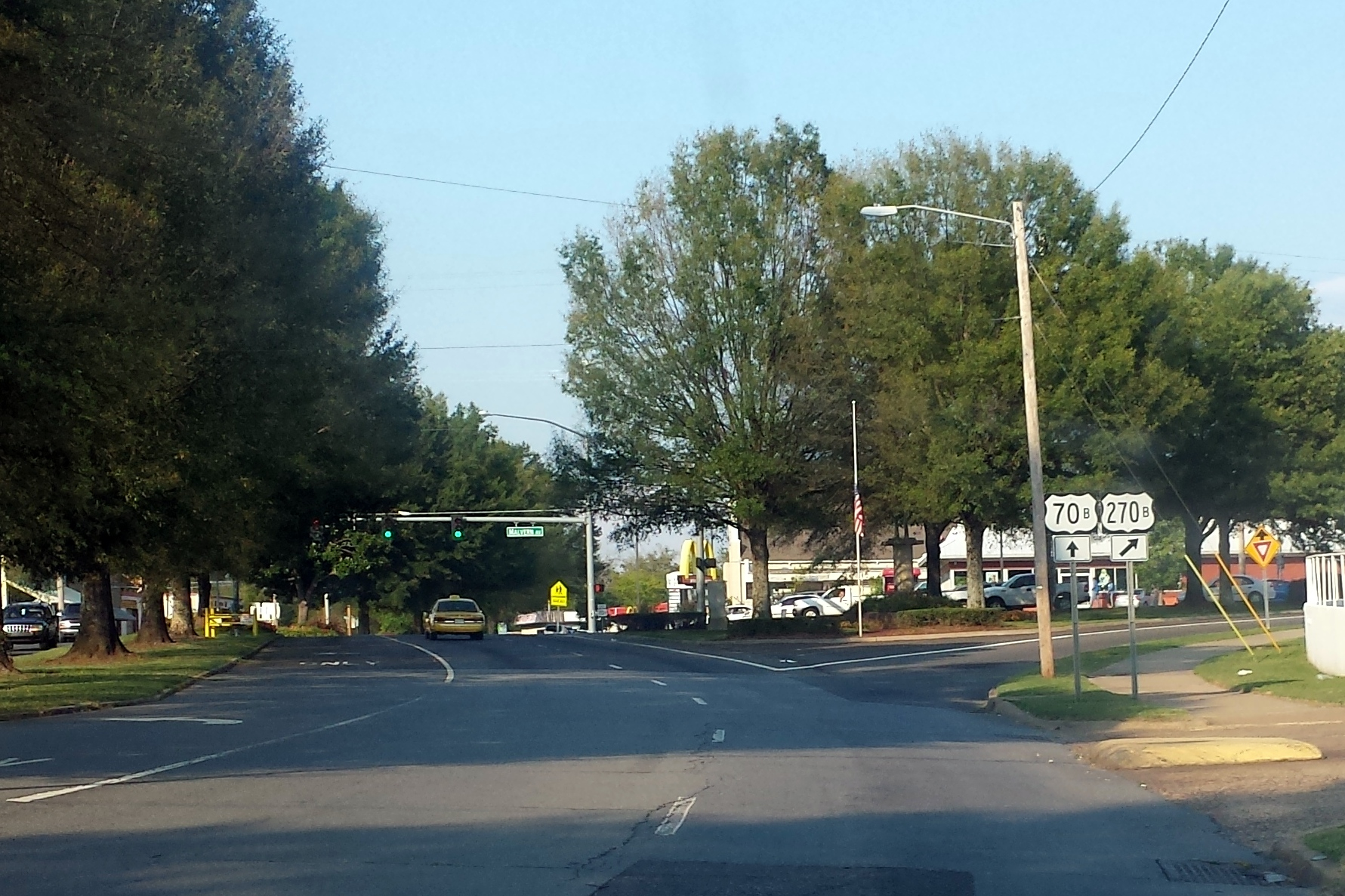
Highway 270B departs Highway 70B in Hot Springs, AR

U.S. Route 70 Business (US 70B or Hwy. 70B) is a 10.05-mile (16.17 km) business route of U.S. Route 70 in Garland County, Arkansas.

US 70B begins at an interchange with US 70/US 270 in southwest Hot Springs. The highway travels along Airport Road and passes Memorial Field Airport before beginning an overlap with US 270B. The two highways travel along Albert Pike Road before turning north onto Sumner Street then turn east onto West Grand Avenue. US 70B intersects Highway 7 near downtown, with the overlap with US 270B ending a few blocks to the east. The highway becomes a freeway near the Gulpha Gorge Campground at Hot Springs National Park. The freeway passes near Magic Springs and Crystal Falls through more rural areas of Hot Springs before ending at an interchange with US 70 and Highway 5.

Major intersections

The entire route is in Garland County.

Location	mi	km	Exit	Destinations	Notes
Hot Springs	0.0	0.0		US 70 (Airport Road) / US 270 – Glenwood, Malvern, Mount Ida	Western terminus; exit 2 on US 70/US 270
Hot Springs	2.0	3.2		US 270B west (Albert Pike Road) – Mount Ida	Western end of US 270B concurrency
Hot Springs	4.1	6.6		AR 7 (Central Avenue) – Business District	Access to CHI St. Vincent Hot Springs
Hot Springs	4.6	7.4		US 270B east (Malvern Avenue)	Eastern end of US 270B concurrency; access to National Park Medical Center
Hot Springs	5.7	9.2	Western end of freeway section		
Hot Springs	5.7	9.2	1	East Grand Avenue	Frontage road; eastbound exit and westbound entrance
Hot Springs	5.8	9.3	2	AR 7S north (Gorge Road) / Magic Springs Drive / Mill Creek Road	No westbound access to Mill Creek Rd.; Magic Springs Dr. not signed westbound; southern terminus of AR 7S
Hot Springs			3	Mill Creek Road	Westbound exit only
Hot Springs	7.5	12.1	4	McClendon Road	
	8.9	14.3	5	Westinghouse Drive	
			6	US 70 west / AR 5 north to US 270 – Glenwood, Mount Ida, Fountain Lake, Hot Springs Village	Eastbound exit and westbound entrance; signed as exits 6A (west) and 6B (north); southern terminus and exit 11B on AR 5
	10.1	16.3		US 70 east – Little Rock	Eastern terminus
1.000 mi = 1.609 km; 1.000 km = 0.621 mi: Concurrency terminus; Incomplete access

== Tennessee ==
=== Brownsville–Huntingdon alternate route ===
U.S. Route 70A
- Location: Brownsville–Huntingdon, Tennessee
- Length: 58.12 mi (93.54 km)

U.S. Route 70 Alternate (US 70A) is an alternate route to US 70 between Brownsville, and Huntingdon in West Tennessee. Signage along this route, and on most maps, show it as US 70A and not US 70 Alternate.

=== Humboldt bypass route ===
U.S. Route 70A Bypass
- Location: Humboldt, Tennessee
- Length: 3.9 mi (6.3 km)

U.S. Route 70A Bypass (US 70 Bypass or US 70A Byp.) is a bypass route of US 70A in Humboldt, Tennessee. It runs concurrently with US 79 Bypass and unsigned SR 366 for its entire length.

=== Huntingdon business loop ===
U.S. Route 70 Business
- Location: Huntingdon, Tennessee
- Length: 2.8 mi (4.5 km)

US Route 70 Business (US 70 Bus.) is a business loop and former segment of mainline US 70 in Huntingdon, Tennessee, which also shares a hidden concurrency with SR 1. The route runs along West Main Street until reaching the heart of town where it encounters and off-center roundabout centering on the historic Carroll County Courthouse, shared in an overlap with TN Bus 22. East of the courthouse, the route runs along East Main Street.

=== Camden business loop ===
U.S. Route 70 Business
- Location: Camden, Tennessee
- Length: 5.4 mi (8.7 km)

US 70 Business (US 70 Bus.) is a business loop in Camden, which also shares a hidden concurrency with SR 391.

Major intersections

The entire route is in Benton County.

Location	mi	km	Destinations	Notes
	0	0.0	US 70 (SR 1) – Bruceton-Hollow Rock, New Johnsonville	Begin of unsigned SR 391 overlap
Camden			US 641 (SR 69) – Paris, Parsons	
Camden	2.7	4.3	SR 69A north / SR 191 north (Forrest Street) – Nathan Bedford Forrest State Park, Eva, Big Sandy	Southern terminus of SR 69A; north end of SR 191 overlap
Camden	4.6	7.4	SR 191 south – Interstate 40	South end of SR 191 overlap
Camden	5.6	9.0	US 70 (SR 1) – New Johnsonville	End of unsigned SR 391 overlap
1.000 mi = 1.609 km; 1.000 km = 0.621 mi: Concurrency terminus

=== Dickson business loop ===
U.S. Route 70 Business
- Location: Dickson, Tennessee

US 70 Business (US 70 Bus.) is a business loop in Dickson, which also shares a hidden concurrency with SR 235. Both routes run along West College Street and East College Street.

Major intersections

The entire route is in Dickson, Dickson County.

mi	km	Destinations	Notes
0.0	0.0	US 70 (Henslee Drive/SR 1/SR 46/SR 235 north) – McEwen, Erin, Tennessee Ridge	Western terminus of US 70 Business and unsigned SR 235 concurrency
		SR 48 Bus. (Main Street)	West College Street becomes East College Street
		SR 48 (Church Street) – Centerville, Charlotte	
		SR 46 (Mathis Drive) to I-40 – Bon Aqua	
		US 70 (Henslee Drive/College Street/SR 1) – White Bluff	Eastern terminus of US 70 Business; southern terminus of unsigned SR 235
1.000 mi = 1.609 km; 1.000 km = 0.621 mi: Concurrency terminus

=== Lebanon business loop ===
U.S. Route 70 Business
- Location: Lebanon, Tennessee
- Length: 3.4 mi (5.5 km)

U.S. Route 70 Business (US 70 Bus.) is a 3.4 miles (5.5 km) business route that replaced US 70 through downtown Lebanon, via Main Street. SR-24 is the "hidden" state route along its entire length.

Major intersections

The entire route is in Lebanon, Wilson County.

mi	km	Destinations	Notes
0.0	0.0	US 70 (W Main Street/SR 24 west/SR 26 east) – Mount Juliet	Western terminus of US 70 Business and unsigned SR 26; western end of unsigned SR 24 concurrency
2.5	4.0	US 231 (Cumberland Street/SR 10) – Murfreesboro, Westmoreland	Roundabout
2.6	4.2	SR 266 (College Street) – Norene, Lascassas	
3.4	5.5	US 70 (Carthage Highway/SR 24 east) / SR 141 (High Street/E Baddour Parkway/SR 26) / US 70N east – Carthage, Watertown	Eastern terminus of US 70 Business; western terminus of US 70N; eastern end of unsigned SR 24 concurrency
1.000 mi = 1.609 km; 1.000 km = 0.621 mi

== North Carolina ==
=== Marshall business loop ===
U.S. Highway 70 Business
- Location: Marshall, North Carolina
- Length: 5.5 mi (8.9 km)
- Existed: 1960–present

U.S. Route 70 Business (US 70 Bus.) was established in 1960 (extended in 1981) and co-signed with US 25 Business, this business loop replaced the old US 70 route through downtown Marshall, via Main Street and Ivy River Road. Route is part of the French Broad Overview Byway.

=== Morganton business loop ===
U.S. Highway 70 Business
- Location: Morganton, North Carolina
- Length: 3.7 mi (6.0 km)
- Existed: 1960–present

U.S. Route 70 Business (US 70 Bus.) was established in 1960 from a renumbering of US 70A, this business loop goes through downtown Morganton via Union and Meeting Streets. Part of the route is shared with US 64 Business and NC 181.

Major intersections

The entire route is in Morganton, Burke County.

mi	km	Destinations	Notes
0.0	0.0	US 64 / US 70 (Union Street) – Marion	
1.0	1.6	US 64 Bus. (Burkemont Avenue) – Rutherfordton	West end of US 64 Business overlap
1.5	2.4	NC 18 south (Sterling Street)	One-way street
1.6	2.6	US 64 Bus. east / NC 18 north / NC 181 north (Green Street)	One-way street; east end of US 64 Business overlap
3.7	6.0	US 70 – Valdese, Hickory	
1.000 mi = 1.609 km; 1.000 km = 0.621 mi: Concurrency terminus

=== Hillsborough business loop ===
U.S. Highway 70 Business
- Location: Hillsborough, North Carolina
- Length: 4.7 mi (7.6 km)
- Existed: 1960–present

U.S. Route 70 Business (US 70 Bus.) was established in 1960 from a renumbering of US 70A, this business loop goes through downtown Hillsborough via Revere Road, Corbin Street, and Church Street. Part of the route is shared with NC 86. Originally, it entered Hillsborough via Hill Avenue and King Street before 1963.

=== Durham business loop ===
U.S. Highway 70 Business
- Location: Durham, North Carolina
- Length: 10.4 mi (16.7 km)
- Existed: 1960–present

U.S. Route 70 Business (US 70 Bus.) was established in 1960 from a renumbering of US 70A, this business loop goes through downtown Durham via the current alignment of Hillsborough Road, 9th Street, Main/Morgan Street, Dillard Street, and Holloway Street. Part of the route is shared with NC 98. The route has had various alignment change through the years.

=== Smithfield business loop ===
U.S. Highway 70 Business
- Location: Smithfield, North Carolina
- Length: 11.8 mi (19.0 km)
- Existed: 1993–present

U.S. Route 70 Business (US 70 Bus.) was established in 1993, it replaced the old mainline US 70 through Smithfield. In 2008, it was extended west, replacing the old mainline US 70 through Clayton. NCDOT plans to reroute US 70 onto the Clayton portion of the route once I-42 is signed on the Clayton Bypass, which would eliminate that part of US 70 Bus. In November 2023, AASHTO approved the eliminating part of US 70 Bus., between Garner and Clayton, and rerouted mainline US 70 along its former alignment through there.

Major intersections

The entire route is in Johnston County.

Location	mi	km	Destinations	Notes
	0.0	0.0	I-42 west / US 70 – Raleigh, Goldsboro	Current western terminus of I-42; Exit 8
Smithfield	6.5	10.5	NC 210 west – Lillington	
Smithfield	7.7	12.4	US 301 / NC 96 (Brightleaf Boulevard) – Benson, Selma	
Smithfield	8.7	14.0	I-95 – Fayetteville, Rocky Mount	
	11.8	19.0	Future I-42 / US 70 – Raleigh, Goldsboro	
1.000 mi = 1.609 km; 1.000 km = 0.621 mi

=== Selma bypass ===
U.S. Highway 70 Bypass
- Location: Selma, North Carolina
- Length: 2.8 mi (4.5 km)
- Existed: July 1997–present

Established in July 1997, US 70 Bypass is part of a rare oddity known as the four US 70s of Selma-Smithfield: US 70, US 70A, US 70 Business, and US 70 Bypass. In an effort to make the area less confusing, NCDOT opted for the Bypass designation as opposed to another business loop. The purpose of the bypass was to avoid traffic tie-ups at I-95 and US 301; the bypass itself is freeway-grade with no interchanges, in which I-95 traffic has to use the mainline US 70 to access either direction from Selma. The bypass is expected to eventually become part of I-42.

=== Pine Level alternate route ===
U.S. Highway 70A
- Location: Pine Level, North Carolina
- Length: 6.9 mi (11.1 km)
- Existed: 1953–present

U.S. Route 70 Alternate (US 70A) was established around 1953, replacing the old mainline US 70 through Pine Level. Originally, it started in Smithfield along US 301 going north to Selma, then east through Pine Level to its eastern terminus near Princeton. In the early 1970s, it was rerouted east from Selma to Wilson's Mills along formerly secondary roads. In 1993, it was truncated at its current western terminus when US 70 was rerouted along the Wilson Mills-Selma route.

Major intersections

The entire route is in Johnston County.

Location	mi	km	Destinations	Notes
	0.0	0.0	US 70 – Raleigh, Goldsboro	
Pine Level	4.6	7.4	Peedin Avenue	
Selma	6.9	11.1	US 70 / NC 39 north – Raleigh, Goldsboro	
1.000 mi = 1.609 km; 1.000 km = 0.621 mi

=== Goldsboro business loop ===
U.S. Highway 70 Business
- Location: Goldsboro, North Carolina
- Length: 5.5 mi (8.9 km)
- Existed: 1960–present

U.S. Route 70 Business (US 70 Bus.) was established in 1960 from a renumbering of US 70A, this business loop goes through downtown Goldsboro via Grantham Street, George Street, and Ash Street. Part of the route is shared with US 117 Business.

=== Kinston business loop ===
U.S. Highway 70 Business
- Location: Kinston, North Carolina
- Length: 4.7 mi (7.6 km)
- Existed: 1960–present

U.S. Route 70 Business (US 70 Bus.) was established in 1960 from a renumbering of US 70A, this business loop goes through downtown Kinston via Vernon Avenue and Queen Street. The route also shared with US 258 Business.

=== New Bern business loop ===
U.S. Highway 70 Business
- Location: New Bern, North Carolina
- Length: 3.8 mi (6.1 km)
- Existed: early 1970s–present

U.S. Route 70 Business (US 70 Bus.) was established in the early 1970s, it replaced the old mainline US 70 through downtown New Bern, via Clarendon Boulevard, Neuse Boulevard, and Front Street. The route is shared with US 17 Business and NC 55.

=== Havelock business loop ===
U.S. Highway 70 Business
- Location: Havelock, North Carolina
- Length: 7.2 mi (11.6 km)
- Existed: 2025–present

U.S. Route 70 Business (US 70 Bus.) is the designation of US 70 in Havelock once the latter route was rerouted onto the Havelock Bypass.

== Former ==
=== Pomona business loop ===
U.S. Route 70 Business
- Location: Pomona, California

=== Hugo business loop ===
U.S. Highway 70 Business
- Location: Hugo, Oklahoma
- Length: 5 mi (8.0 km)
- Existed: 2019

Business U.S. Highway 70 (US 70 Bus.) was a business route of US 70 in Hugo, Oklahoma which is 5 miles (8.0 km) long. It starts at US 70 outside of Hugo and goes into Hugo. In the center of town, it starts running concurrently with U.S. Route 271 Business until they both end outside of Hugo at an interchange with the Indian Nation Turnpike, U.S. Route 271 and US 70. The route was decommissioned in 2019 to eliminate highway traffic from passing through Hugo.

Major intersections

The entire route is in Choctaw County.

Location	mi	km	Destinations	Notes
	0.0	0.0	US 70	Southern terminus
Hugo	2.4	3.9	US 271 Bus. south (North Broadway Street)	Southern end of concurrency with US 271 Bus.
	5	8.0	Indian Nation Turnpike north / US 271 / US 70 – Antlers, Durant, McAlester, Idabel, Paris	Northern terminus and northern end of concurrency with US 271 Bus.
1.000 mi = 1.609 km; 1.000 km = 0.621 mi: Concurrency terminus

=== Kirby–Lockesburg temporary route ===
U.S. Highway 70 Temporary
- Location: Kirby–Lockesburg, Arkansas
- Existed: July 18, 1956

U.S. Highway 70 Temporary was a designation for a route between Kirby and Lockesburg, Arkansas while a new alignment of US 70 was under construction. The designation was removed on July 18, 1956. The highway overlapped Highway 27 between Kirby and Nashville before turning onto Highway 24 (now US 371) between Nashville and the US 71 junction in Lockesburg.

=== Benton city (business) loop ===
U.S. Highway 70C
- Location: Benton, Arkansas
- Existed: May 13, 1959–January 23, 1974

U.S. Route 70C (US 70C, the "C" for "City", i.e., a business loop) formerly ran between what is now Interstate 30 (I-30) exits 116 (Sevier & South Streets) and 118 (Congo Road) in Benton, Arkansas. Though it was largely the result of a rerouting of US 70 and US 67 from Little Rock around downtown Benton in 1955, most of which later became I-30, it was not created until 1959 after US 70 was further rerouted between Benton and Hot Springs.

Since the place where US 67 and US 70 separated was moved by both reroutings—first in 1955 from downtown Benton to present-day I-30 exit 117 (AR 5/AR 35) just north of downtown where the new route crossed old US 70 (now AR 5 north of I-30 and AR 35 south of it), then in 1959 to present-day I-30 exit 111 (Arkansas Health Center) near Haskell—most of US 70C was actually the pre-1955 route of US 67, of which only present-day Military Road north of AR 35 was also the pre-1955 route of US 70. The only exception was at the eastern end; since there was no interchange where the pre-1955 US 67/US 70 route crossed I-30 just outside Benton, US 70C used Congo Road from Military Road to present-day I-30 Exit 118.

When the rerouted US 67/US 70 was formally designated as I-30 in 1960, US 70C also became Benton's I-30 business loop. Both loops were decommissioned by 1975. The entire route was taken over by the City of Benton, except for a short section of Military Road added to AR 88 to connect it with AR 35.

=== Little Rock business loop ===
U.S. Highway 70B
- Location: Little Rock, Arkansas to North Little Rock, Arkansas
- Existed: c. 1976–c. 2006

The segment of present US 70 from where it leaves Interstate 30 at exit 132 (University Avenue) in Little Rock, Arkansas, to I-30 exit 141 (Broadway) in North Little Rock, was signed as US 70B from the mid-1970s to the mid-2000s. It was previously the route of U.S. 70 as well as US 67; it was also I-30 Bus. until that route was deleted earlier in the 1970s.

Before US 70B was created, US 70 ran concurrently with I-30 from exit 111 (Hot Springs) near Haskell to exit 132, as it does today. Its US 67 concurrency fell between two different U.S. 67 concurrencies with I-30; one (shared with U.S. 70) was from Exit 114 (then Arkansas State Hospital, now Arkansas Health Center) near Haskell to exit 132, while the other (shared with US 65/US 167) was from exit 141 to the end of I-30 at exit 143B (I-40), also in North Little Rock.

While US 70B was active, US 70 continued its concurrency with I-30 past exit 132 to exit 141, where it returned to its original route. U.S. 67 also moved to I-30 when US 70B was created, thus making its concurrency with I-30 continuous from exit 114 to the end of I-30. Both concurrencies were shared with US 65/US 167 beginning at Exit 138B (Pine Bluff-El Dorado, now the beginning of I-530). However, many Arkansas state highway maps continued to show US 70B as US 67/US 70, and sometimes even as I-30 Bus. (years after it was officially deleted).

Although I-30 signs at exit 132 still refer to University Avenue as US 70B and claim US 70 East continues on I-30 East, and I-30 signs at exit 141B refer only to US 70 East (US 70 West formerly joined I-30 West at that exit), all signs on the business loop were changed back to US 70 in the mid-2000s, thus officially truncating US 70's concurrency with I-30 at exit 132. US 67 did not return to this route; it remains concurrent with I-30 from exit 114 (and US 65/US 167 from exit 138B) to the end of I-30.

=== Morganton alternate route ===
U.S. Highway 70A
- Location: Morganton, North Carolina
- Existed: 1938–1953

U.S. Route 70 Alternate (US 70A) was established in 1937 or 1938, as a downtown alternate route of US 70 along Meeting Street. By 1953 it was decommissioned; however, its routing would be reestablished by US 70 Business in 1960.

=== Hickory alternate route 1 ===
U.S. Highway 70A
- Location: Hildebran–Conover, NC
- Length: 12.2 mi (19.6 km)
- Existed: 1946–1948

U.S. Route 70 Alternate (US 70A) was established in 1946 as a new alternate route bypassing south of Hickory. In 1948, it was replaced by US 70.

=== Hickory alternate route 2 ===
U.S. Highway 70A
- Location: Hildebran–Conover, NC
- Existed: 1948–1957

U.S. Route 70 Alternate (US 70A) was established in 1948 after US 70 was rerouted south bypassing Hickory. In 1956 or 1957, the route was decommissioned and downgraded to secondary roads; known today as US HWY 70A (SR 1007), 1st Ave SW/SE (SR 1692) and Highland Avenue (SR 1007).

=== Salisbury alternate route ===
U.S. Highway 70A
- Location: Salisbury, North Carolina
- Length: 1.8 mi (2.9 km)
- Existed: 1938–1957

U.S. Route 70 Alternate (US 70A) was established in 1938 as a new alternate routing bypassing downtown Salisbury. The route began at the intersection of Innes Street, going east along Mahaley Avenue/Confederate Avenue, then southeast on Club Drive/11th Street, ending at North Main Street. In 1957, US 70A was replaced by US 70; which lasted for four years before reverting onto Innes Street. After 1961, the routing was downgraded to secondary road (SR 1910) before the state eventually handed the former alternate route to the city of Salisbury.

=== Lexington business loop ===
U.S. Highway 70 Business
- Location: Lexington, North Carolina
- Existed: 1960–2002

Established in 1960 from a renumbering of US 70A, it originally went through downtown Lexington via Main Street. It was decommissioned by 2002.

=== Lexington alternate route ===
U.S. Highway 70A
- Location: Lexington, North Carolina
- Length: 3.8 mi (6.1 km)
- Existed: 1952–1960

U.S. Route 70 Alternate (US 70A) was established in 1952 as a renumbering of US 70 through Lexington. Sharing a concurrency with US 29A, it traveled along Main Street. In 1960 it was renumbered as US 70 Business.

=== Thomasville business loop ===
U.S. Highway 70 Business
- Location: Thomasville, North Carolina
- Existed: 1960–1968

Established in 1960 from a renumbering of US 70A, it originally went through downtown Thomasville via Main Street and Turner Street; it was in concurrence with US 29 Business. It was decommissioned by 1968.

=== High Point alternate route 1 ===
U.S. Highway 70A
- Location: High Point, North Carolina
- Existed: 1934–1948

The first U.S. Route 70 Alternate (US 70A) in High Point was established in 1934 as a renumbering of NC 10A; the entire route was in concurrency with US 29A. It went north along Westchester Drive then east on Lexington Road/Greensboro Road back to US 29/US 70. Around 1948, this alignment was replaced by US 29/US 70.

=== High Point alternate route 2 ===
U.S. Highway 70A
- Location: High Point, North Carolina
- Existed: 1948–1957

The second U.S. Route 70 Alternate (US 70A) in High Point was established around 1948 after US 29/US 70 switched to follow the first alternate alignment through the city; the entire route was in concurrency with US 29A. The alternate route now followed English Road, Main Street and Montlieu Avenue before reconnecting US 29/US 70 at Greensboro Road. In 1957, US 70A was decommissioned, while US 29A remained.

=== High Point–Greensboro alternate route ===
U.S. Highway 70A
- Location: High Point–Greensboro, NC
- Existed: 1952–1991

U.S. Route 70 Alternate (US 70A) was established in 1952 as a renumbering of US 70 through downtown Thomasville. In 1957, US 70A was extended east, replacing US 70 through High Point (Westchester Drive, Lexington Road and Greensboro Road), Jamestown (High Point Road), Greensboro (Lee, Spring Garden, Aycock, Fairground and Market Streets), Burlington, Mebane and Efland; which was US 70A's apex, at nearly 66 miles (106 km) long. In 1960, US 70A through downtown Thomasville was replaced by US 70 Business. In 1962, US 70A westbound was rerouted from Spring Garden and Fairground streets onto Lee and Aycock streets, in Greensboro. Around 1963, US 70A eastern terminus was truncated at O. Henry Boulevard; everything east from that point was reverted to US 70. In 1966 and again in 1968, US 70A was rerouted on various splits through downtown Greensboro. In 1969, US 70A was rerouted to use Lee Street to Murrow Boulevard, then north to Summit Avenue. Around 1991, the entire route was decommissioned, most of it becoming secondary, except for English Road continuing as NC 68.

=== Greensboro alternate route ===
U.S. Highway 70A
- Location: Greensboro, North Carolina
- Existed: 1938–1957

U.S. Route 70 Alternate (US 70A) was established in 1938 as a new alternate routing through downtown Greensboro, via Fairground Avenue (Chapman Street?) and Market Street; the entire rout was in concurrency with US 29A. By 1949, it was extended south to Lee Street, but was moved back to its terminus along Spring Garden Street by 1953. In 1957 it was decommissioned when US 29/US 70 was rerouted onto freeways and its former alignment absorbed by High Point's US 70A.

=== Hillsborough alternate route 1 ===
U.S. Highway 70A
- Location: Hillsborough, North Carolina
- Existed: 1942–1948

The first U.S. Route 70 Alternate (US 70A) in Hillsborough was established in 1942 as a new alternate bypass north of downtown. It was replaced by US 70.

=== Hillsborough alternate route 2 ===
U.S. Highway 70A
- Location: Hillsborough, North Carolina
- Existed: 1948–1960

The second U.S. Route 70 Alternate (US 70A) in Hillsborough was established in 1948 when US 70 replaced the first alternate route bypassing north of downtown. It traversed along Hill and King Streets, replaced in 1960 by US 70 Business.

=== Durham–Raleigh alternate route ===
U.S. Highway 70A
- Location: Durham–Raleigh, NC
- Existed: 1934–1948

U.S. Route 70 Alternate (US 70A) was established in 1934 as a renumbering of NC 10A, which traveled from Chapel Hill Street, in downtown Durham, southeast on Main Street and Angier Avenue, to Miami Boulevard, in Bethesda. In 1937, US 70A was extended southeast into Raleigh, via Glenwood Avenue, Peace, Person, Edenton, and East Streets, ending at Lenoir Street; this replaced NC 9. In 1948, US 70A was replaced by US 70.

=== Durham alternate route ===
U.S. Highway 70A
- Location: Durham, North Carolina
- Existed: 1948–1960

U.S. Route 70 Alternate (US 70A) was established in 1948 when US 70 replaced the first alternate connecting Durham and Raleigh. Starting at Roxboro Road, it traveled through downtown Durham via Main, Alston, and Angier Avenue; at Bethesda, it goes south along Miami Boulevard and Chapel Hill Road into Cary, then going east along Western Boulevard into Raleigh, where it connects with Boylan Avenue, South, Fayetteville, Lenoir and finally East Street, where it reconnects with US 70. Between 1950-1953, US 70A was divided on one-way alignments in downtown Raleigh: eastbound used South to East streets, westbound used Lenoir to Saunders streets. By 1952, US 70A was rerouted west from Bethesda onto and overlapping with US 70 to Holloway street, where it went into the downtown area along Roxboro, Pettigrew, Chapel Hill, Duke, Main, and 9th streets before connecting onto Hillsborough Road. US 70A then continued on Bennett Memorial Drive before reconnecting again with US 70; Angier Street was downgraded to a secondary road (SR 1926). Around 1956, US 70A was truncated at the new Durham Bypass freeway. Miami Boulevard, south of Bethesda, downgraded to a secondary road (SR 1959); NC 54 replaced it in Cary; US 64 replaced it from Cary into Raleigh. In 1960, US 70A was replaced by US 70 Business, except for Bennett Memorial Drive, which was downgraded to secondary road (SR 1313).

=== Garner business loop ===
U.S. Highway 70 Business
- Location: Garner, North Carolina
- Existed: 1986–1994

Established in 1986 after US 70 moved onto the Raleigh beltline. The business loop was removed in 1994 when US 70 moved back to its original route through Garner.

=== Smithfield alternate route ===
U.S. Highway 70A
- Location: Smithfield, North Carolina
- Existed: 1949–1953

U.S. Route 70 Alternate (US 70A) was established between 1945-1949 as a new alternate route through downtown Smithfield, via Second and Hancock Streets. By 1953, it was decommissioned and returned to the Smithfield.

=== Goldsboro bypass ===
U.S. Highway 70 Bypass
- Location: Goldsboro–La Grange, NC
- Length: 21.7 mi (34.9 km)
- Existed: May 2016–September 2024

U.S. Route 70 Bypass (US 70 By-pass) was an approximately 22.3-mile (35.9 km) controlled-access highway bypassing north of Goldsboro, connecting with US 70 west of Goldsboro and west of La Grange. It was approved by AASHTO on September 25, 2015, with its official establishment dependent on its completion; at the time, the current completed sections were temporarily signed as NC 44. On May 27, 2016, the last section, the eastern section from Wayne Memorial Drive to US 70 west of La Grange, was completed, and the road was officially renamed the US 70 Byp. The route was redesignated as part of Interstate 42 in September 2024.

=== Goldsboro alternate route ===
U.S. Highway 70A
- Location: Goldsboro, North Carolina
- Length: 5.5 mi (8.9 km)
- Existed: 1957–1960

U.S. Route 70 Alternate (US 70A) was established in 1956 or 1957, it followed the old US 70 route through downtown Goldsboro; it was replaced by US 70 Business in 1960.

=== Kinston alternate route ===
U.S. Highway 70A
- Location: Kinston, North Carolina
- Length: 4.7 mi (7.6 km)
- Existed: 1957–1960

U.S. Route 70 Alternate (US 70A) was established in 1956 or 1957, it followed the old US 70 route through downtown Kinston; it was replaced by US 70 Business in 1960.

=== Beaufort business loop ===
U.S. Highway 70 Business
- Location: Beaufort, North Carolina
- Length: 3.3 mi (5.3 km)
- Existed: June 2018–October 2019

U.S. Route 70 Business (US 70 Bus.) was the designation of secondary roads that mostly follow along the former US 70 route through downtown Beaufort. The routing in question ran south along Turner Street (SR 1174) then east on Cedar Street (SR 1493) and transitions onto Live Oak Street as it goes northeasterly before reconnecting with US 70. Signage of US 70 Bus. possibly appeared soon after the mainline US 70 rerouting on new bypass route north of Beaufort in January 2018, confirmed with Google Street View imagery from July 2018. The routing does not exist on NCDOT mapping/records nor was it submitted to AASHTO for approval. The road was decommissioned in October 2019 and was given to the city of Beaufort.

== See also ==
- List of special routes of the United States Numbered Highway System
