= Tennessee State Route 69A =

State highway in Tennessee, United States

State Route 69A
- SR 69A mainline in red

Route information
- Auxiliary route of SR 69
- Maintained by TDOT
- Length: 27.1 mi (43.6 km)

Major junctions
- South end: US 70 Bus. / SR 191 in Camden
- North end: US 641 in Paris

Location
- Country: United States
- State: Tennessee
- Counties: Benton, Henry

Highway system
- Tennessee State Routes; Interstate; US; State
← SR 69	→ US 70

State Route 69A (SR 69A) is a 27.1-mile-long (43.6 km) state highway and alternate route of SR 69 in the western portion of the U.S. state of Tennessee. It travels through a mostly rural area of western Tennessee. It is one of three remaining alternate state routes in Tennessee.

== Route description ==
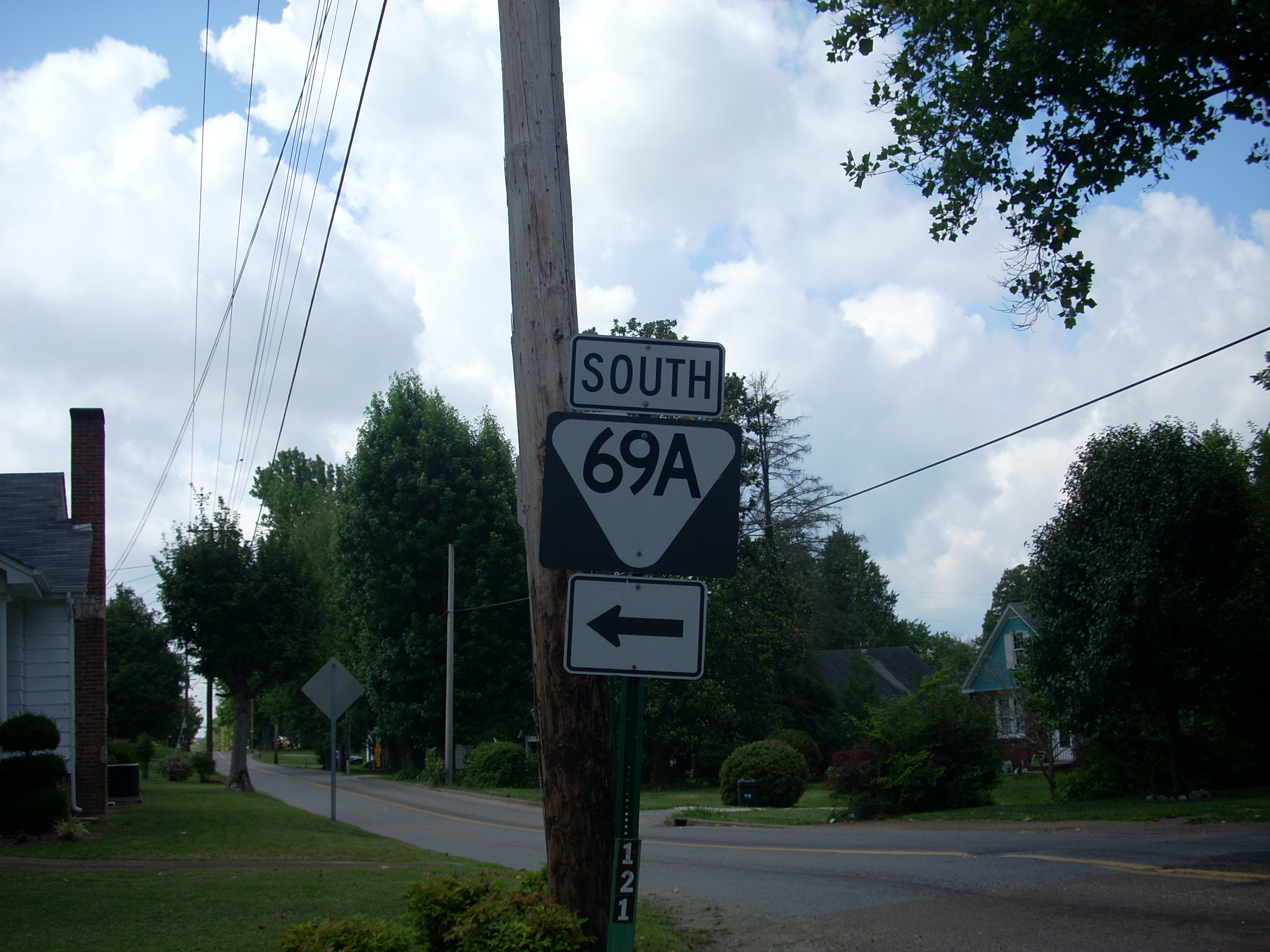
State Route 69A reassurance shield north of Camden, TN.

SR 69A begins in downtown Camden at an intersection with US 70 Bus./SR 191/SR 391. The route travels to the north on North Forrest Avenue, it then turns west onto West Frazier Street and then back north onto Washington Drive. SR 69A passes Camden's middle and high schools and leaves the city limits. The route twists and turns continuing northward to the town of Big Sandy where the route intersects SR 147 and turns west. It continues a westerly course until it meets its northern terminus, an intersection with US 641/SR 69 in Paris. Except at its north end, the entire route of SR 69A is a two-lane highway.

== Major intersections ==
County	Location	mi	km	Destinations	Notes
Benton	Camden	0.0	0.0	US 70 Bus. / SR 191 south (West Main Street/South Forrest Avenue/SR 391) – Nashville, Memphis, Parsons, Waverly, Dickson	Southern terminus of SR 69A; Southern end of 295 feet concurrency with SR 191
Benton	Camden	0.0	0.0	SR 191 north (East Lake Street) – Eva, Nathan Bedford Forrest State Park	Northern end of SR 191 concurrency
Benton	Big Sandy	13.7	22.0	SR 147 east (Main Street) – McKinnon, Tennessee Ridge	Western terminus of SR 147
Henry	Paris	25.0	40.2	SR 218 (Paris Bypass) – Camden, Paris Landing	
Henry	Paris	27.1	43.6	US 641 (Memorial Drive/SR 69) – Camden, Puryear, Hazel	Northern terminus
1.000 mi = 1.609 km; 1.000 km = 0.621 mi: Concurrency terminus

== See also ==
- List of state routes in Tennessee
- Tennessee State Route 69
