= Tennessee State Route 191 =

State highway in Tennessee, United States

State Route 191
- SR 191 highlighted in red

Route information
- Maintained by TDOT
- Length: 24.02 mi (38.66 km)
- Existed: July 1, 1983–present

Major junctions
- South end: I-40 at Exit 133
- US 70 at Camden US 70 Bus. at Camden; SR 69A at Camden
- North end: Nathan Bedford Forrest State Park north of Eva

Location
- Country: United States
- State: Tennessee
- Counties: Benton

Highway system
- Tennessee State Routes; Interstate; US; State
← SR 190	→ SR 192

State Route 191 (abbreviated SR 191) is a 24.02 miles (38.66 km) north-south secondary state highway in Benton County, Tennessee.

== Route description ==
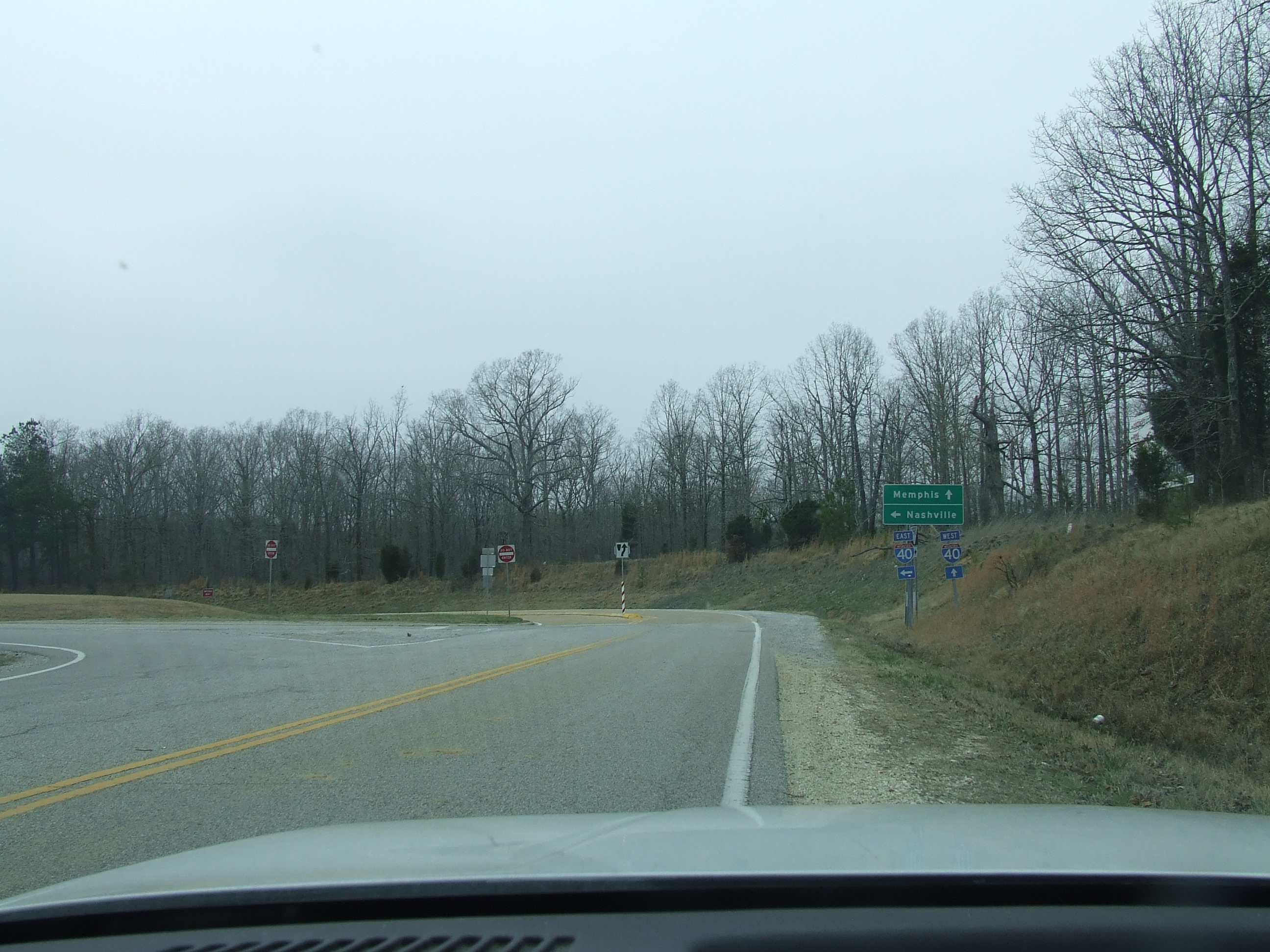
Southern Terminus at Interstate 40 Exit 133

SR 191 runs from I-40 (Exit 133) north to Nathan Bedford Forest State Park just north of Eva, Tennessee. This highway crosses US 70, US 70 Bus, and SR 69A. The section of road from I-40 to US 70 is also known as Birdsong Road. This highway passes through the small communities of Chalk Level, Eva, and the town of Camden.

Near the northern terminus this road features unstripped shoulders, narrow roadway width, hairpin curves, and degraded pavement. All sections of SR 191 are quite curvy, with speed limits at the southern sections dropping from 55 mph (89 km/h) to 45 mph (72 km/h). North of Camden, the posted speed limit is 50 mph (80 km/h) and drops off from 40 mph (64 km/h) at Eva to as low as 20 mph (32 km/h) inside the state park. Total length of highway is 24.02 miles (38.66 km).

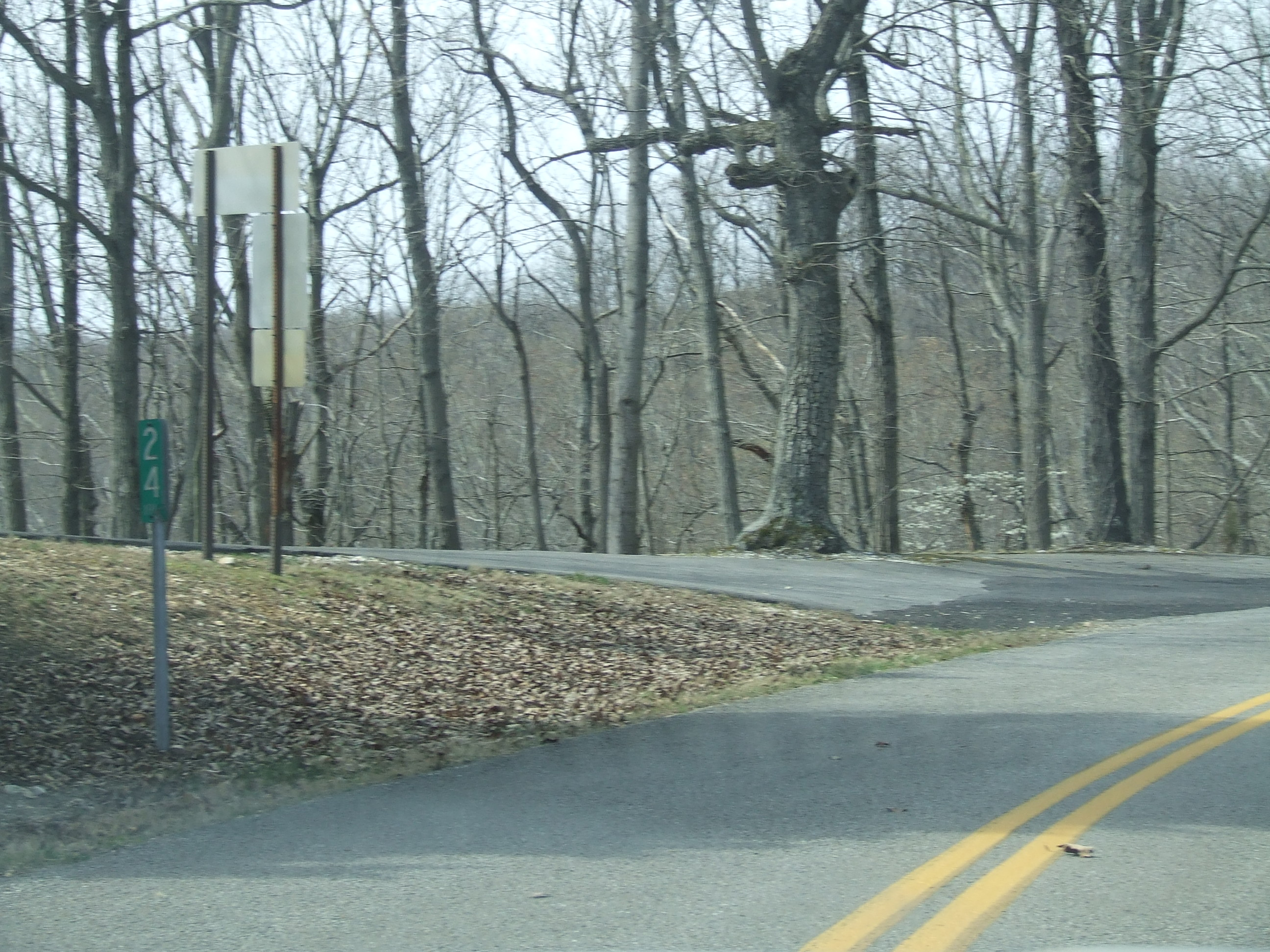
Northern Terminus at Mile Marker 24 north of Eva, Tennessee

== Major intersections ==
The entire route is in Benton County.

Location	mi	km	Destinations	Notes
	0.0	0.0	I-40 – Memphis, Nashville	I-40 exit 133
			US 70 (SR 1) – Huntingdon, Bruceton, New Johnsonville, Waverly	
			US 70 Bus. east (S Forrest Avenue/SR 391 east) – New Johnsonville	Southern end of US 70 Bus/SR 391 concurrency
Camden			US 70 Bus. west (W Main Street/SR 391 west) / SR 69A begins – Bruceton	Southern terminus of SR 69A; southern end of SR 69A concurrency; northern end of US 70 Bus/SR 391 concurrency
Camden			SR 69A north (N Forrest Avenue) – Big Sandy	Northern end of SR 69A concurrency
Nathan Bedford Forrest State Park	24.02	38.66	Dead end in Nathan Bedford Forrest State Park	Northern terminus
1.000 mi = 1.609 km; 1.000 km = 0.621 mi: Concurrency terminus
