= Tennessee State Route 232 =

Highway

State Route 232
- SR 232 highlighted in red

Route information
- Maintained by TDOT
- Length: 13.6 mi (21.9 km)
- Existed: July 1, 1983–present

Major junctions
- South end: SR 147 in McKinnon
- North end: US 79 (SR 76) in Land Between the Lakes National Recreation Area

Location
- Country: United States
- State: Tennessee
- Counties: Houston, Stewart

Highway system
- Tennessee State Routes; Interstate; US; State
← SR 231	→ SR 233

State Route 232 (SR 232) is a north–south secondary state highway located in northwestern Middle Tennessee. the 13.6-mile (21.9 km) route traverses western Houston and southwestern Stewart counties. It connects SR 147 at McKinnon to U.S. Route 79 (US 79) and LBL Forest Road 236 in western Stewart County.

== Route description ==
SR 232 begins in Houston County in McKinnon at an intersection with SR 147 just east of the Tennessee River. It goes north through wooded areas and crosses into Stewart County. It continues north through wooded and rural areas to pass through Mulberry Hill before coming to an end at an intersection with US 79/SR 76 in the Land Between the Lakes National Recreation Area.

== Major intersections ==
County	Location	mi	km	Destinations	Notes
Houston	McKinnon	0.0	0.0	SR 147 – Big Sandy, Tennessee Ridge	Southern terminus
Stewart	Land Between the Lakes National Recreation Area	13.6	21.9	US 79 (SR 76) – Paris, Dover	Northern terminus
1.000 mi = 1.609 km; 1.000 km = 0.621 mi
