= Tennessee State Route 147 =

State highway in Tennessee, United States

State Route 147
- SR 147 highlighted in red

Route information
- Maintained by TDOT
- Length: 23.64 mi (38.04 km)

Major junctions
- West end: SR 69A in Big Sandy
- SR 232 in McKinnon
- East end: SR 49 in Tennessee Ridge

Location
- Country: United States
- State: Tennessee
- Counties: Benton, Houston

Highway system
- Tennessee State Routes; Interstate; US; State
← SR 146	→ SR 148

State Route 147 (SR 147) is an east–west state highway that traverses Benton County in West Tennessee and Houston County in Middle Tennessee. The route is 23.64 miles (38.04 km) long, and it crosses Kentucky Lake/Tennessee River via a ferry boat.

== Route description ==
=== Benton County ===
SR 147 begins in Benton County in West Tennessee in downtown Big Sandy at an intersection with SR 69A. It goes north as Main Street before curving east onto Front Street, then turns north onto 2nd Street, crosses a bridge over a creek, before turning east onto Lick Creek Road to leave Big Sandy. SR 147 then comes to a Y-Intersection where it becomes Danville Road. The highway then passes through wooded areas as it turns northeast and becomes curvy before reaching the Danville Ferry to cross Kentucky Lake/Tennessee River into Houston County and Middle Tennessee.

=== Houston County ===
SR 147 continues east to pass through McKinnon, where it passes by Houston County Airport and has an intersection with SR 232, before passing through the community of Stewart. SR 147 continues east to enter Tennessee Ridge, where it passes through downtown before coming to an end at an intersection with SR 49.

== Major intersections ==
County	Location	mi	km	Destinations	Notes
Benton	Big Sandy	0.0	0.0	SR 69A – Camden, Paris	Western terminus
Kentucky Lake/Tennessee River				Danville Ferry across Kentucky Lake/Tennessee River	
Houston	McKinnon			SR 232 north (Standing Rock Road) – Dover, Paris	Southern terminus of SR 232
Houston	Tennessee Ridge	23.64	38.04	SR 49 (Highway 49/W Main Street) – Dover, Erin	Eastern terminus
1.000 mi = 1.609 km; 1.000 km = 0.621 mi

== History ==
The ferry between Benton and Houston counties began operation in November 2007.
