= Houston County Airport =

Houston County Airport may refer to:

- Perry-Houston County Airport in Houston County, Georgia, United States
- Houston County Airport (Minnesota) in Houston County, Minnesota, United States
- Houston County Airport (Tennessee) in Houston County, Tennessee, United States
- Houston County Airport (Texas) in Houston County, Texas, United States

== See also ==
- Houston Airport (disambiguation)
- Houston International Airport (disambiguation)
