= Eva site =

Prehistoric Native American site in Benton County, Tennessee

Eva Site
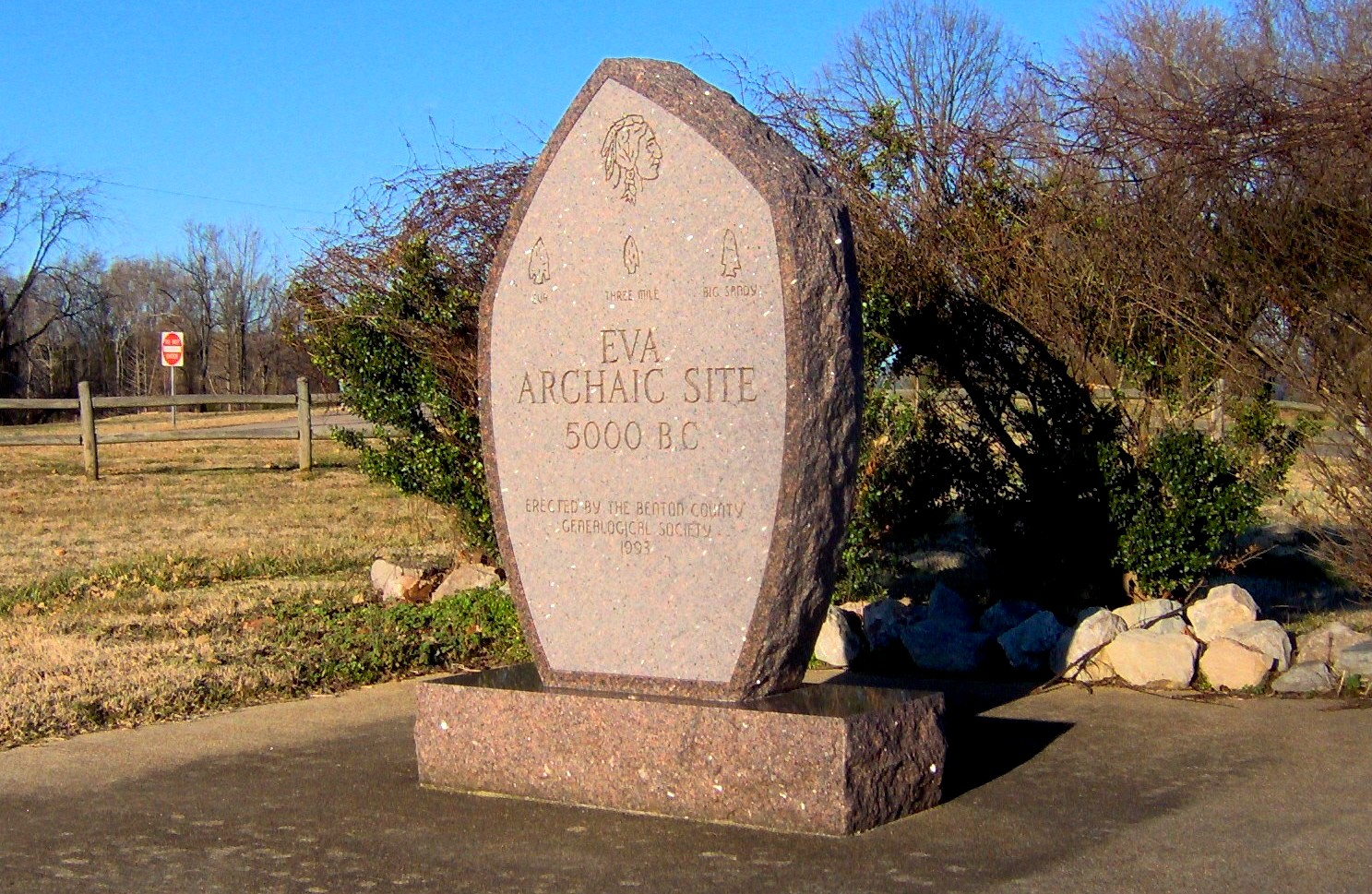
- Eva Monument at Eva Beach

- Location within Tennessee today
- 36°4′29.17″N 87°58′59.34″W
- Cultures: Archaic period
- Location: Benton County, Tennessee, United States

Site notes
- Excavation dates: 1940

The Eva site (40BN12) is a prehistoric Native American site in Benton County, Tennessee, in the Southeastern United States. Located along an ancient channel of the Tennessee River, the Eva site saw extensive periods of occupation during the Middle and Late Archaic period (c. 6000-1000 BC). The site's well-defined midden layers helped investigators identify three distinct Archaic cultures, the oldest of which was first identified at Eva and is still known as the "Eva culture" or the "Eva phase."

The Eva site is now submerged by Kentucky Lake, an artificial reservoir created by the impoundment of the Tennessee River by Kentucky Dam. In 1940, before the Tennessee River was dammed to form Kentucky Lake, University of Tennessee archaeologists conducted excavations at the Eva site and managed to extract a relatively large amount of data. The data and artifacts were analyzed by University of Tennessee anthropologists Thomas Lewis and Madeline Kneburg Lewis, who presented their findings in a 1961 publication entitled Eva, an Archaic Site.

== Geographical setting ==
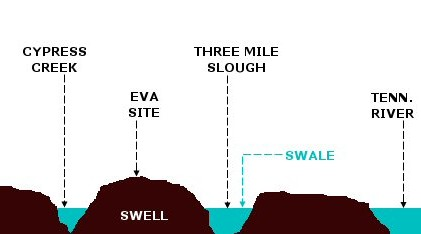
Diagram showing a rough pre-inundation profile of the floodplain upon which the Eva site was located. Approximately one mile separated the site from the Tennessee River.

The Tennessee River enters the Benton County area from the south and proceeds northward for nearly 100 miles (160 km) before emptying into the Ohio River. Kentucky Dam, located nearly 80 miles (130 km) downstream from the Eva site, was completed in 1944 and created a lake that spans most of the state from north-to-south. Hills that comprise the western fringe of the Highland Rim rise as high as 300 feet (91 m) above the river to the east and west. The Eva site is named for the community of Eva, which is centered approximately 2 miles (3.2 km) to the southwest.

Before inundation by Kentucky Lake, the Eva site was located on a flood plain that stretched for nearly 2 miles (3.2 km) between the river bank and the hills to the west. This floodplain was characterized by a series of swells (natural levees created by river deposits) and swales (ancient river channels and tributary channels). The Eva site was situated on a high swell between a swale known as Three Mile Slough to the east and a swale known as the Cypress Creek Slough to the west. In Archaic times, the Tennessee River proper flowed through Three Mile Slough (roughly a mile west of its modern pre-inundation channel). As Three Mile Slough joins Cypress Creek immediately north of the Eva site, it's likely the site was situated at the ancient confluence of Cypress Creek and the Tennessee River.

Kentucky Lake is managed by the Tennessee Valley Authority. Much of the current lakeshore above the Eva site is part of Nathan Bedford Forrest State Park. The submerged Eva site is visible from atop Pilot Knob to the north and from the Eva Beach boat ramp to the south. In 1993, the Benton County Genealogical Society erected a small monument at Eva Beach recalling the Eva site's Archaic-era importance.

== Archaeological findings ==
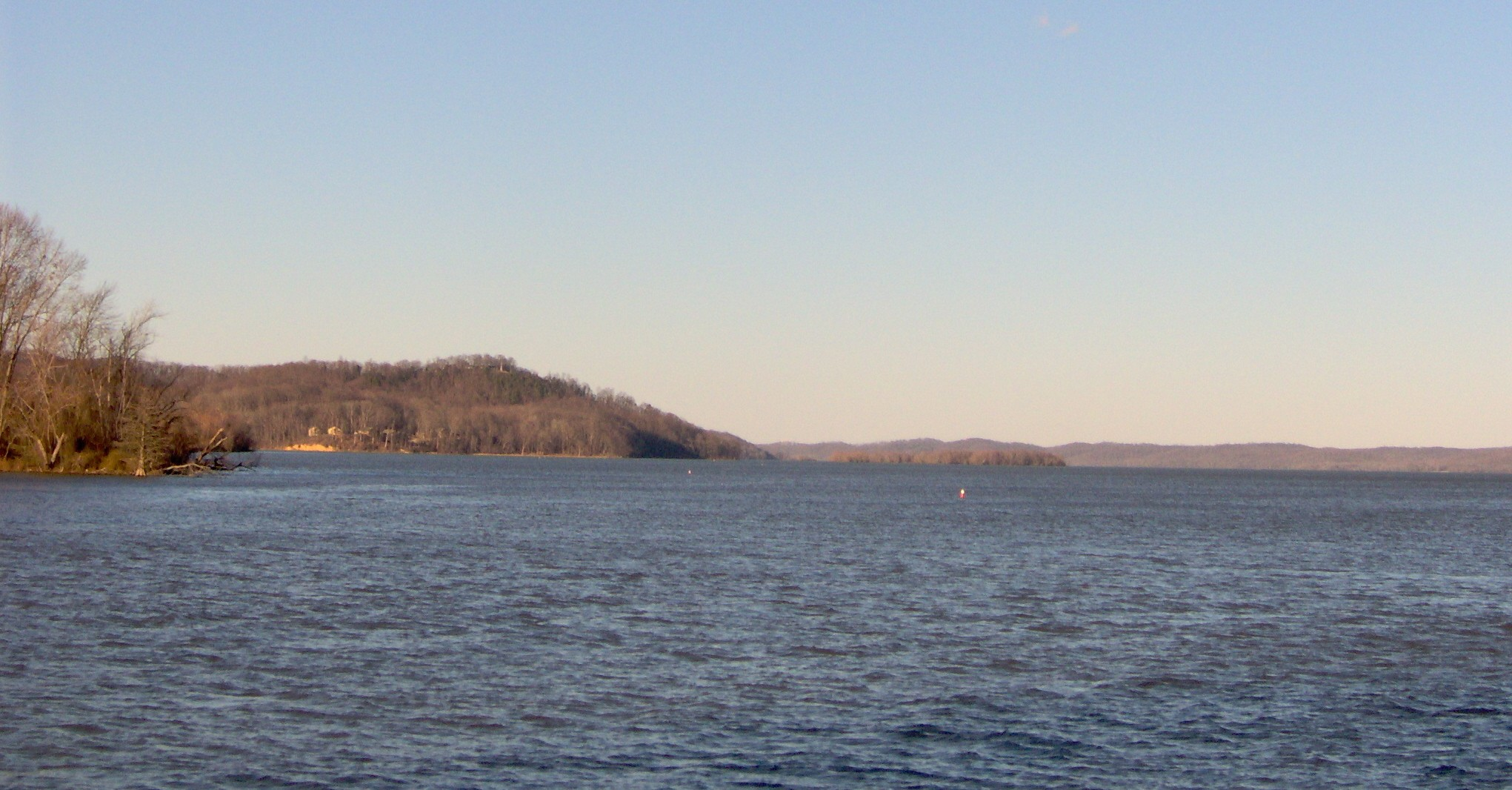
The Eva site, looking north from Eva Beach

The University of Tennessee and the Works Progress Administration conducted excavations at the Eva site from September 11, 1940 through November 23, 1940. Excavators identified six soil layers, the uppermost being the plowzone and the others labeled Strata I-V, with Stratum V being the deepest. The plowzone and Stratum I contained artifacts that were predominantly associated with a Late Archaic people known as the Big Sandy culture, who occupied the Eva site roughly 2000-1000 BC (and possibly as late as 500 BC). Stratum II contained artifacts associated with a Middle Archaic people known as the Three Mile culture, who occupied Eva around 4000-2000 BC. Stratum III contained only scant cultural material, indicating that the Eva site was unoccupied for a period around 4000 BC. Stratum IV and Stratum V contained material associated with a culture first identified at Eva and thus referred to as the Eva culture. The Eva culture was operating at the Eva site by 5200 BC and probably occupied the site as early as 6000 BC.

Flint and chert artifacts uncovered at Eva included projectile points, blades, and butchering tools. Stone artifacts included atlatl weights, gorgets, and pestles. Bone artifacts included awls, needles, fishhooks, and a necklace composed of snake vertebrae. Antler artifacts included scrapers, projectile points, and atlatl hooks.

180 human burials were uncovered at the Eva site. These burials included 29 infants, 11 children, 7 juveniles, and 133 adults. Most of the adults were younger than 45 years old, although a few lived well into their 70s. Pathological analyses conducted on the site's human remains indicates that Eva's Archaic inhabitants were healthy compared to the region's later cultures. Along with the human burials, 18 dog burials were uncovered at the Eva site.

== The Eva site's inhabitants ==
While Clovis points and other Paleo-Indian artifacts have been found along the Tennessee River in Benton County, major occupation of the site didn't begin until around 6000 BC during the Middle Archaic period. Substantial occupation continued at Eva until at least 1000 BC and possibly as late as 500 BC. While pottery sherds dating to the Woodland period and Mississippian period were uncovered at Eva, they were relatively scant. The Eva site was uninhabited when Euro-American explorers and settlers arrived in the late 18th century, although the junction of two major Native American trails ("traces") occurred just south of the site.

Cultural materials and features uncovered from Stratum IV and Stratum V (which correlate to the Eva culture) include mussel shells, fire-cracked rocks, flint chips, antler tools, projectile points, and animal bones (mostly deer). Using radiocarbon testing, an antler section uncovered from Stratum IV was dated to roughly 5200 BC. A pile of chert projectile point blanks and the relatively large number of tools might indicate the location of a workshop.

Very little cultural material was uncovered from Stratum III, indicating a significant gap between the Eva occupation and the Three Mile occupation. Materials and features uncovered in Stratum II (which correlates to the site's Three Mile phase) include fire-cracked rocks, mussel shells and a curious mussel shell arrangement, ash content, and animal bones. While deer bones still comprised the majority of the animal bones, the percentage was significantly lower than that of the Eva phase, indicating a greater reliance upon fish and bird meat.

Cultural materials uncovered from Stratum I and the plowzone (which correlate to the site's Big Sandy phase) include burned clay, a hearth, a mortar, hammerstones, and bone needles. Deer still comprised the greatest percentage of animal bones, but, as with the site's Three Mile phase, birds and fish were providing major supplements. Unlike previous phases, however, very few mussel shells were uncovered in Stratum I. Lewis and Lewis hypothesized that the lack of mussel shells indicates higher river levels in the Late Archaic period.

== Sources ==
- Lewis, Thomas M N; Lewis, Madeline D Kneburg (1961). Eva: An Archaic Site. Knoxville, TN: University of Tennessee Press. OCLC 256456.
