= Post Oak, Benton County, Tennessee =

Post Oak
- Unincorporated community
- Location within Tennessee Location within the United States
- Coordinates: 36°04′21″N 88°08′13″W
- Country: United States
- State: Tennessee
- County: Benton
- Elevation: 522 ft (159 m)
- Time zone: UTC-6 (Central (CST))
  - Summer (DST): UTC-5 (CDT)
- Area code: 731
- GNIS feature ID: 1315770

Post Oak is an unincorporated community in Benton County, Tennessee.
