= McKinnon, Tennessee =

- Unincorporated community
- Location within Tennessee Location within the United States
- Coordinates: 36°18′58″N 87°54′25″W
- Country: United States
- State: Tennessee
- County: Houston
- Elevation: 397 ft (121 m)
- Time zone: UTC-6 (Central (CST))
  - Summer (DST): UTC-5 (CDT)
- Area code: 931
- GNIS feature ID: 1293385

McKinnon is an unincorporated community in Houston County, Tennessee, United States. McKinnon is located at the junction of Tennessee State Route 147 and Tennessee State Route 232, 7.5 miles (12.1 km) west of Tennessee Ridge. Houston County Airport is located in McKinnon, as is the eastern terminus of a ferry across the Tennessee River operated by the Tennessee Department of Transportation.

McKinnon once had a post office, which opened in 1888. The post office was located in a general store run by Norman McKinnon, who was also the first postmaster.
