= Houston International Airport =

Houston International Airport may refer to:

- William P. Hobby Airport, previously Houston International Airport
- George Bush Intercontinental Airport, Houston, Texas' main international airport

== See also ==
- Houston Airport (disambiguation)
- Houston County Airport (disambiguation)
