= Houston Airport =

Houston Airport may refer to:

- George Bush Intercontinental Airport, primary airport serving Houston, Texas, United States
- William P. Hobby Airport, serving Houston, Texas, United States
- Ellington Airport (Texas), serving Houston, Texas, United States
- Houston Aerodrome near Houston, British Columbia, Canada

== See also ==
- Houston County Airport (disambiguation)
- Houston International Airport (disambiguation)
