= Bethesda, Durham County, North Carolina =

- Unincorporated community
- Location within the state of North Carolina
- Coordinates: 35°56′33″N 78°50′18″W
- Country: United States
- State: North Carolina
- County: Durham
- Time zone: UTC-5 (Eastern (EST))
  - Summer (DST): UTC-4 (EDT)
- ZIP codes: 27703
- GNIS feature ID: 981185

Bethesda is an unincorporated community in southeastern Durham County, North Carolina, United States, on South Miami Boulevard, off U.S. Route 70. The community has two churches, two schools, and a ZIP code of 27703. It has mostly been annexed into the city of Durham.

Bethesda was named for Bethesda Baptist Church, which was organized in 1884.

== Works cited ==
- Anderson, Jean Bradley (2011). Durham County: A History of Durham County, North Carolina. Durham: Duke University Press. ISBN 9780822349839.
