= Houston County Airport (Tennessee) =

- IATA: none; ICAO: none; FAA LID: M93

Summary
- Airport type: Public
- Owner: Houston County
- Location: McKinnon, Tennessee
- Elevation AMSL: 370 ft (110 m)
- Coordinates: 36°19′00″N 087°55′00″W

Map
- Location of airport in Tennessee M93 (the United States)

Runways
Direction	Length		Surface
Direction	ft	m	Surface
8/26	3,000	914	Asphalt

Statistics (2023)
- Aircraft operations (year ending 8/3/2023): 1,975
- Source: Federal Aviation Administration

Houston County Airport (FAA LID: M93) is a public airport located in McKinnon, in Houston County, Tennessee, United States. It is owned by Houston County.

== Facilities and aircraft ==
Houston County Airport covers an area of 84 acres (34 ha) which contains one asphalt paved runway, 8/26, measuring 4,000 x 75 ft (914 x 23 m).

For the 12-month period ending August 3, 2023, the airport had 1,730 aircraft operations, average 38 per week: 86% general aviation and 14% military.

== See also ==
- List of airports in Tennessee
