= Nathan Bedford Forrest State Park =

State park in Tennessee, United States

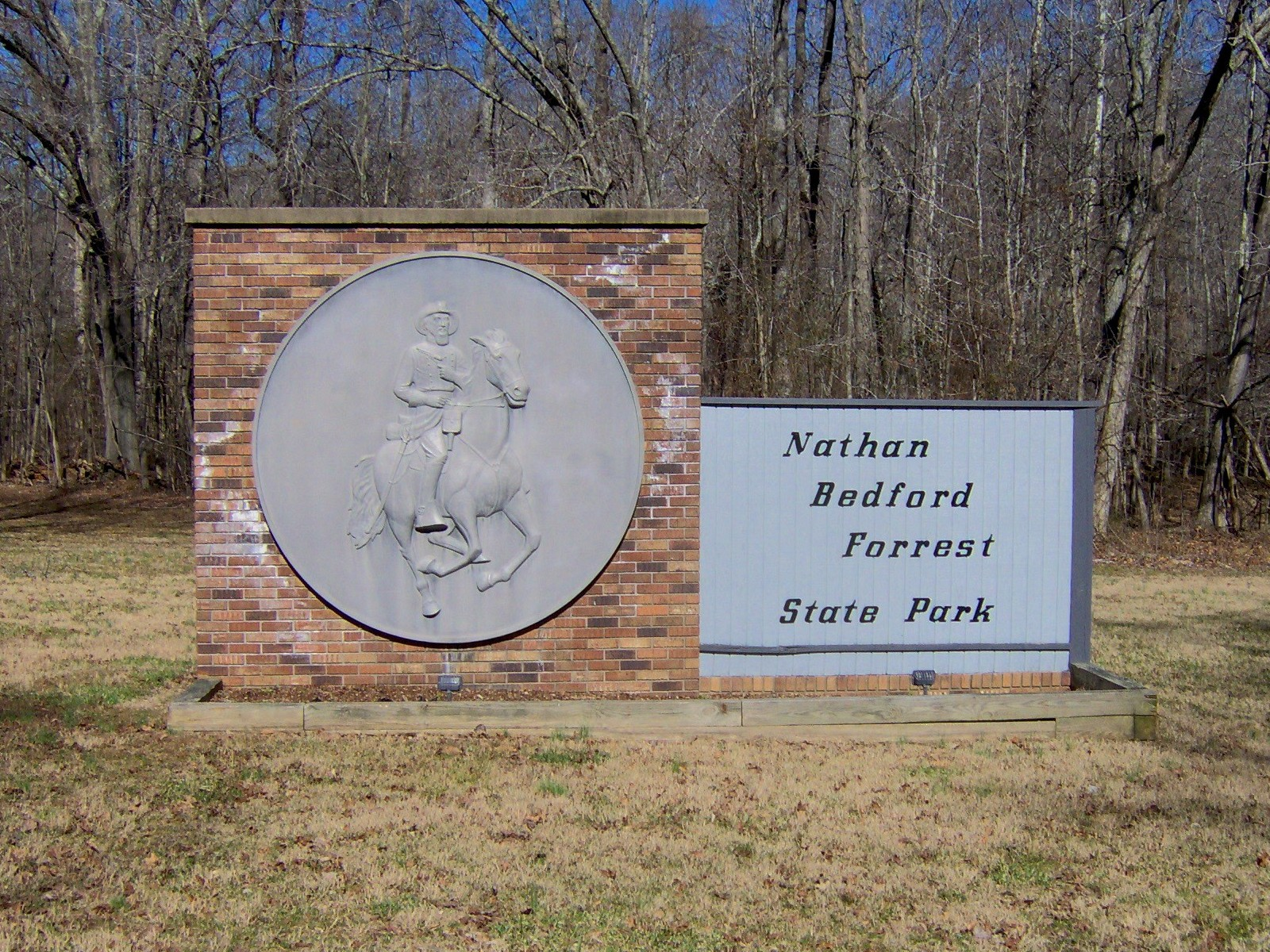
- Park entrance sign along TN-191
- Interactive map of Nathan Bedford Forrest State Park
- Type: Tennessee State Park
- Location: Benton County, Tennessee
- Coordinates: 36.08868°N 87.97416°W
- Area: 2,587 acres (10.47 km^{2})
- Operator: Tennessee Department of Environment and Conservation
- Website: Nathan Bedford Forrest State Park

Nathan Bedford Forrest State Park is a state park in Benton County, Tennessee, in the southeastern United States. The park is situated on the western shore of the Kentucky Lake impoundment of the Tennessee River, just north of the community of Eva. Established in 1929, the park consists of 2,587 acres (10.47 km^{2}) managed by the Tennessee Department of Environment and Conservation.

The park is named after Confederate General and Ku Klux Klan leader Nathan Bedford Forrest (1821–1877), who conducted operations in the area during the U.S. Civil War. The park encompasses part of Forrest's operational area during the 1864 Battle of Johnsonville, in which Forrest attacked and destroyed a Union supply depot and transfer station on the opposite bank of the river.

Along with the battle site, features in the park include Pilot Knob, which at 656 feet (200 m) is one of the highest points in West Tennessee, and the Tennessee River Folklife Center, which interprets life in the lower Tennessee Valley in the 19th and 20th centuries.

== Geographical setting ==
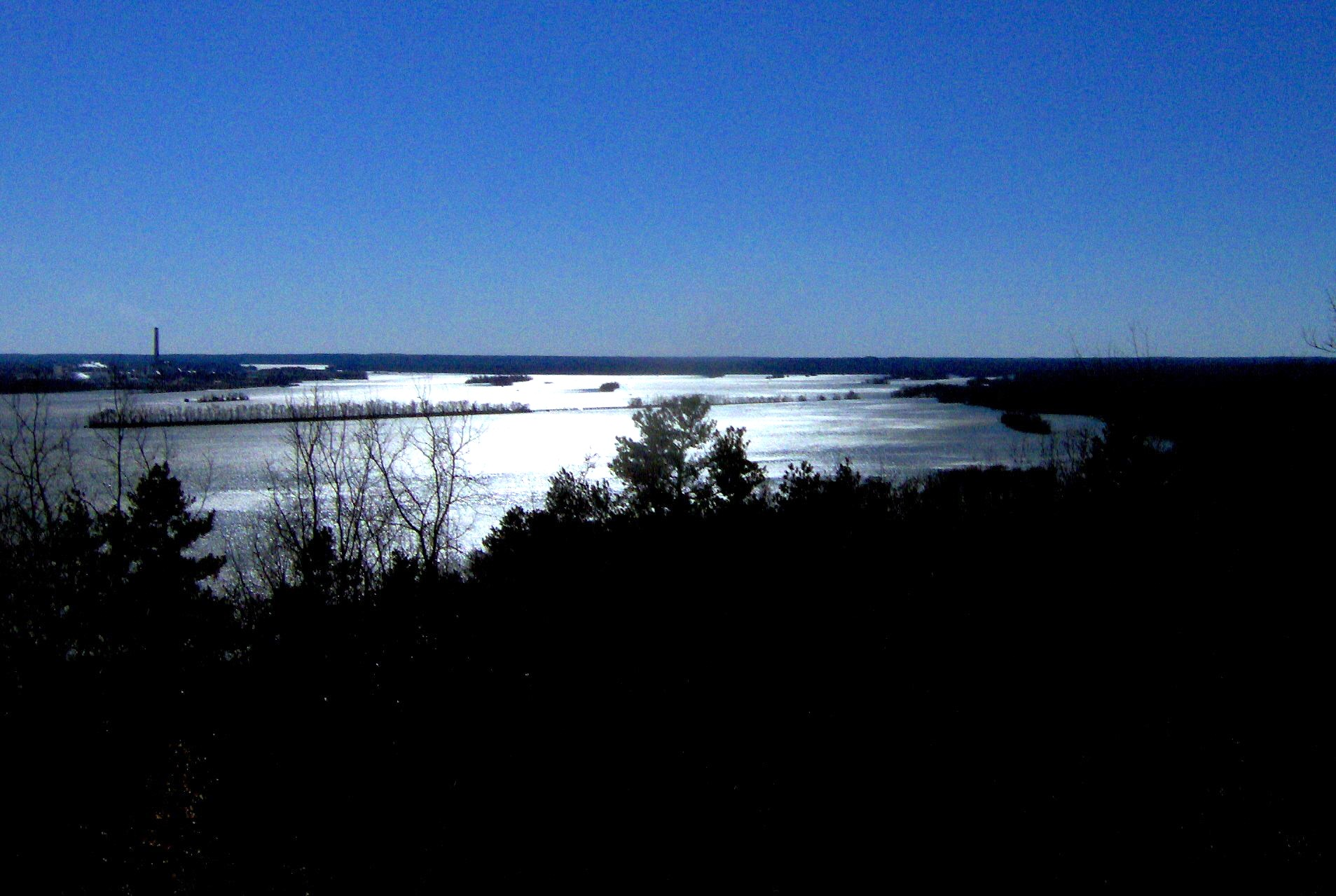
The Tennessee River, looking south from Pilot Knob

The Tennessee River enters the Benton County/Humphreys County area from the south, where it absorbs the Duck River and the Beech River, and proceeds northwestward for another 100 miles (160 km) before emptying into the Ohio River. Kentucky Lake, created with the completion of Kentucky Dam in 1944, covers a 184-mile (296 km) stretch of the river between Kentucky Dam (near Paducah) and Pickwick Landing Dam, near the Tennessee-Alabama border to the south. Nathan Bedford Forrest State Park is situated along the western bank of Kentucky Lake, approximately 80 miles (130 km) upstream from Kentucky Dam.

Pilot Knob is the pinnacle of a ridge that extends approximately 3 miles (4.8 km) northwestwardly to the Harmon Creek valley, along the park's northwestern boundary. Much of the park's topography consists of ridges and hollows that run roughly parallel to Pilot Knob Ridge. The park's offices are located on the slopes of Pilot Knob, and the Tennessee River Folklife Center and hiking trailheads are located at its summit.

State Route 191, which terminates atop Pilot Knob, connects the park to Interstate 40 and U.S. Route 70 to the south.

== History ==
The Benton County area has been occupied on a semi-permanent basis for at least 7000 years. In 1940, University of Tennessee archaeologists excavated a substantial Archaic period (8000-1000 BC) site along Cypress Creek, near the park's southern boundary. The actual site— named the Eva site after the nearby community— is now submerged by Kentucky Lake. At the Eva site, University of Tennessee archaeologists Thomas Lewis and Madeline Kneburg uncovered 180 human burials and artifacts dating to roughly 5200 BC. The area saw sporadic occupation during the Woodland and Mississippian periods, although the population had dwindled considerably by the 17th century.

By the time Euro-American settlers arrived, the eastern Benton County area was traversed by several well-beaten paths, or "traces." Before inundation, the stretch of the Tennessee River between Benton and Humphreys counties was relatively low, making it a popular crossing point. The Cisco and Middle Tennessee Trace ran north-to-south, connecting the Benton County area with the Pinson Mounds in Madison County to the southwest. Near the modern US-70 bridge, the trail intersected the Lower Harpeth and West Tennessee Trace, which ran east-to-west.

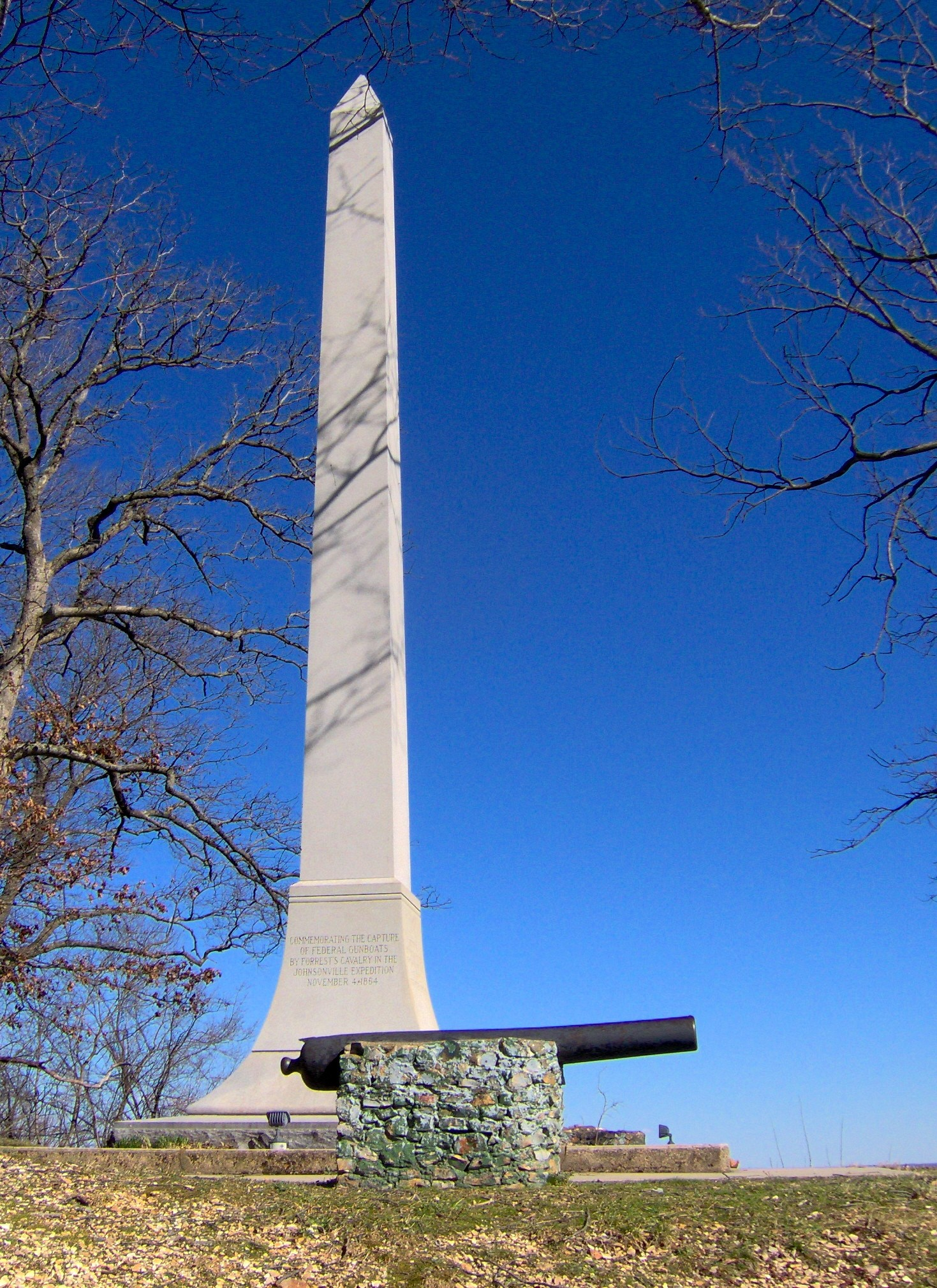
Obelisk atop Pilot Knob commemorating the Battle of Johnsonville

=== The Battle of Johnsonville ===
In the Fall of 1864, at the height of the U.S. Civil War, General William T. Sherman captured the city of Atlanta and began making preparations to march south to Savannah. Hoping to lure Sherman northward, General John Bell Hood initiated maneuvers intended to cut Union supply lines in Tennessee. As Hood moved west, General Nathan B. Forrest moved northeast from Corinth, Mississippi, reaching the Tennessee-Kentucky line on October 28, and proceeding south along the river. In early November, Forrest managed to secretly position his artillery on the west bank of the river, opposite the Federal supply depot at Johnsonville. Although most of Forrest's operations were concentrated around the now-submerged sloughs just north of the modern Eva boat ramp, Forrest did manage to position two guns atop Pilot Knob, which offered a more direct line of fire into the Federal fortifications.

During the war, Johnsonville was established as the western terminus of the Nashville and Northwestern Railroad, which connected the Lower Tennessee Valley with Nashville. Massive amounts of food and munitions were stored at Johnsonville, where they awaited transfer from boat-to-train or vice versa. The position was heavily fortified and guarded by 2,000 Union soldiers and several gunboats. When Forrest opened fire on the morning of November 4, however, Union commanders within the fort panicked. Fearing that Forrest would overwhelm the fort, Union troops burned their gunboats and transport vessels, and attempted to evacuate the fort by train. At Waverly, the train abandoned its load of supplies, and continued eastward to Nashville.

Forrest managed to retreat back to Corinth before the arrival of Union reinforcements. Union losses included 8 dead or wounded and 150 captured. Forrest reported 2 dead and 9 wounded. Union forces lost millions of dollars' worth of supplies, ammunition, and vessels, and a rumor that Forrest was marching northward caused a general panic among Union forces in the Ohio Valley. The site of Johnsonville (typically called "Old Johnsonville" to distinguish from the modern New Johnsonville) is now protected by Johnsonville State Historic Park.

=== Establishment of Nathan Bedford Forrest State Park ===
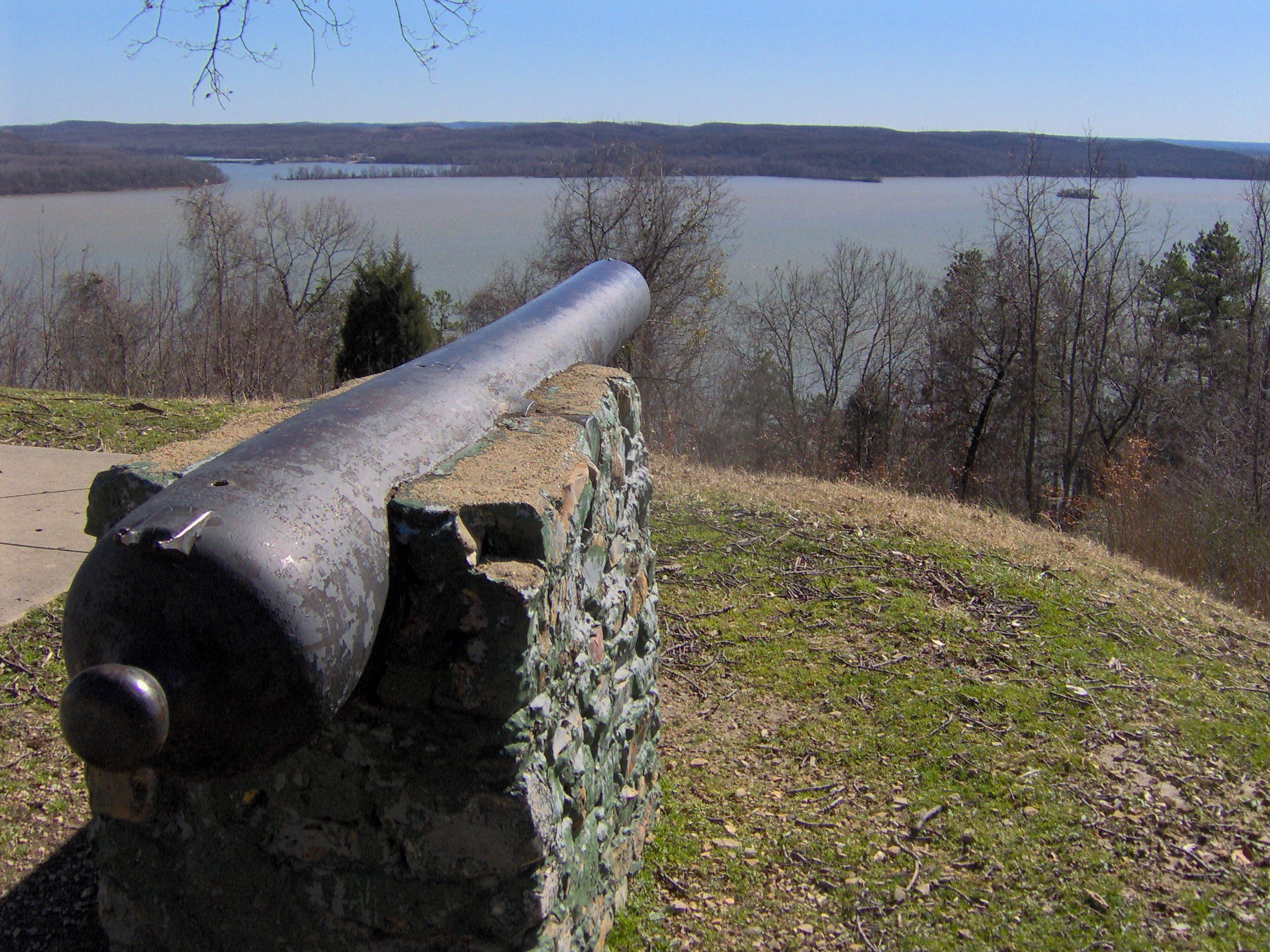
Cannon atop Pilot Knob aimed at the site of Johnsonville

Much of the land along the park's southern section was once owned by the Pafford family, who arrived in the mid-19th century. The Paffords held Independence Day celebrations near the modern park entrance that drew visitors from all over the county, and eventually featured Grand Ole Opry performers. The Paffords aided General Forrest during the Battle of Johnsonville, and eventually served as the park's first caretakers.

In December 1929, the state of Tennessee established Nathan Bedford Forrest Memorial Park atop Pilot Knob, which had been donated by the Paffords. A road was built connecting Eva with Pilot Knob, where a memorial consisting of a granite obelisk had been erected. In the mid-to-late 1930s, the Civilian Conservation Corps and Works Progress Administration arrived to build the park's roads, trails, and facilities.

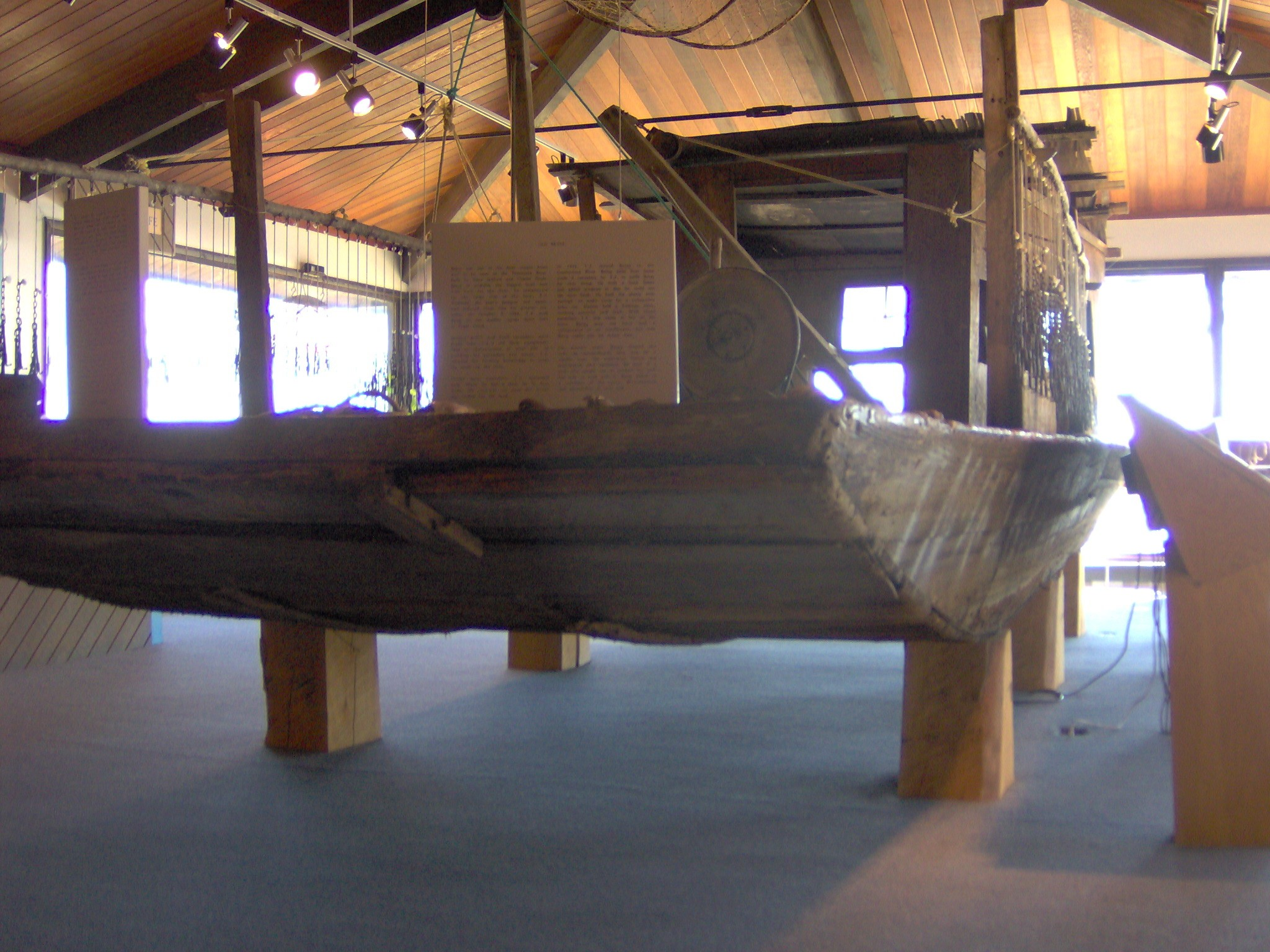
Johnboat on display at the Tennessee River Folklife Center

== Facilities ==
Facilities at Nathan Bedford Forrest State Park include seven rental cabins, an RV campground, two primitive campgrounds, a 64-person group lodge, and three boat ramps. The park maintains approximately 30 miles (48 km) of hiking trails, most of which consists of a 20-mile (32 km) loop trail with various shortcuts that can shorten the hike to 3, 5, or 10 miles.

== Tennessee River Folklife Museum ==
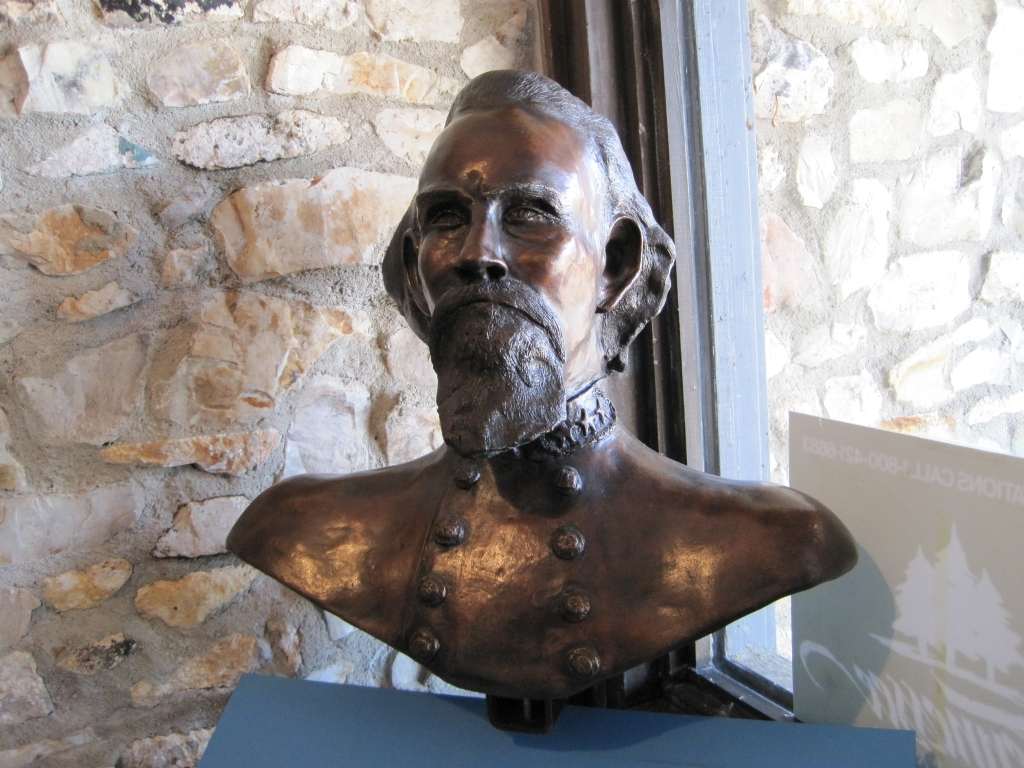
Bust of Nathan Bedford Forrest in the museum.

The Tennessee River Folklife Museum is situated atop Pilot Knob at the end of State Route 191. The museum interprets the life and customs of people living along the lower Tennessee River in the late 19th and early 20th centuries. The center includes audio and video recordings, old implements used in musseling and a fully preserved 1950s-era johnboat. The museum also houses a small nature center displaying fish and reptiles commonly found in the area.

== Naming controversy ==
Nathan Bedford Forrest's legacy as a Confederate general and founder of the Ku Klux Klan has periodically motivated proposals to remove his name from the park. Some members of the Tennessee state legislature made such a proposal in the aftermath of the 2015 Charleston church shooting. State Senator John Stevens, in whose district the park is located, said "I'm not for it or against it" but compared the removal of Forrest's name to the destruction of cultural heritage by the Islamic State of Iraq and Syria.

Similar controversy has arisen in recent years over memorials and entities named for Forrest, including Nathan Bedford Forrest High School in Jacksonville, Florida, and a proposal in Mississippi to honor Forrest on one of the state's specialty license plates. Nathan Bedford Forrest State Park is often mentioned amidst these controversies.

== Resources ==
- Hurst, Jack. Nathan Bedford Forrest: A Biography, 1993.
- Lytle, Andrew Nelson. Bedford Forrest and His Critter Company, 1931. Republished in 1984 by J.S. Sanders & Co.
- Wyeth, John Allen. That Devil Forrest, 1899 (original) republished in 1989 by Louisiana State University Press.
