= Eva, Tennessee =

Eva
- CDP
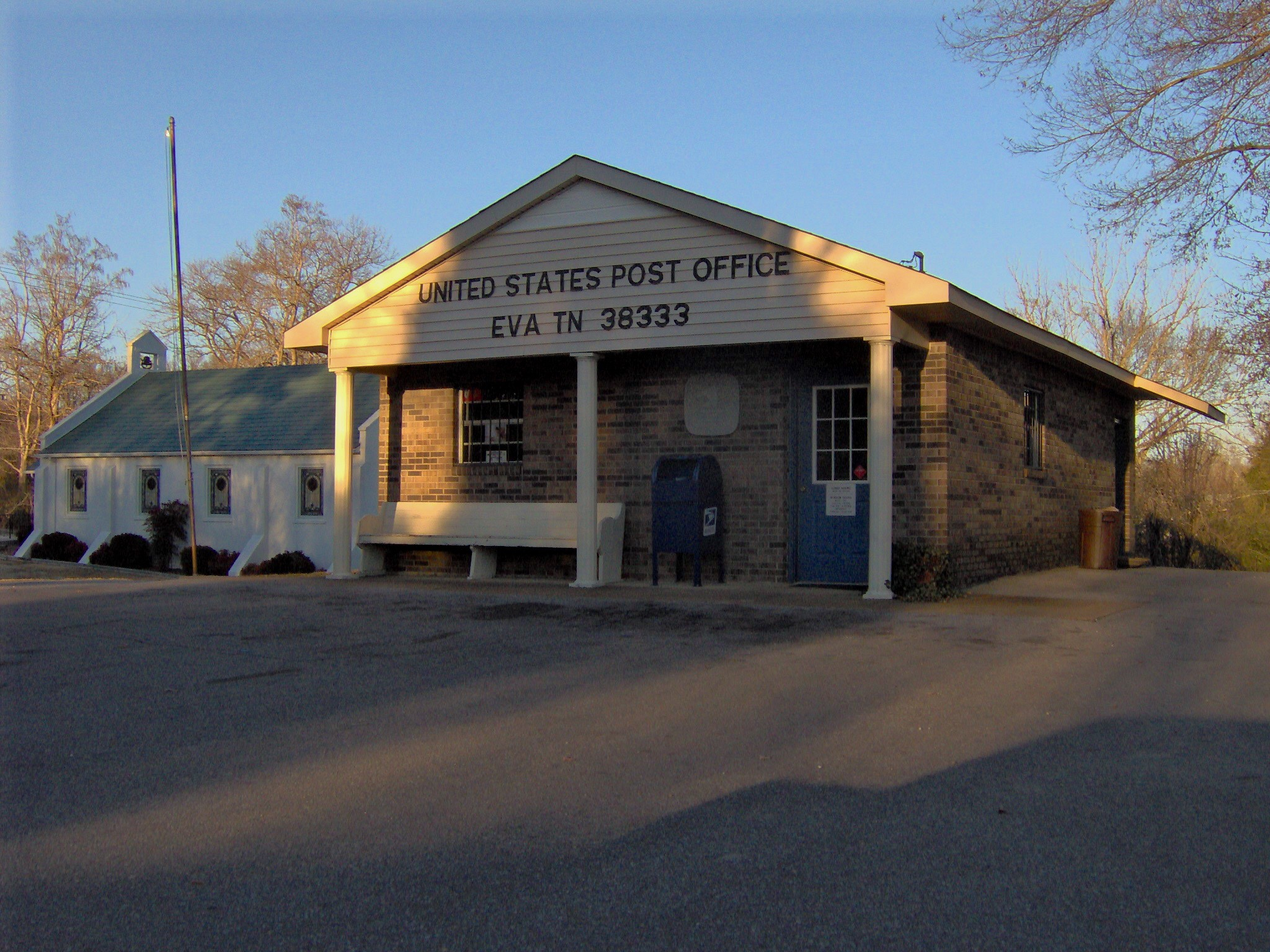
- Eva post office

- Location within Tennessee Location within the United States
- Coordinates: 36°03′52″N 88°00′15″W
- Country: United States
- State: Tennessee
- County: Benton

Area
  - Total: 2.03 sq mi (5.26 km^{2})
  - Land: 1.99 sq mi (5.15 km^{2})
  - Water: 0.039 sq mi (0.10 km^{2})
- Elevation: 417 ft (127 m)

Population (2020)
  - Total: 239
  - Density: 120.1/sq mi (46.37/km^{2})
- Time zone: UTC-6 (Central (CST))
  - Summer (DST): UTC-5 (CDT)
- ZIP code: 38333
- Area code: 731
- GNIS feature ID: 1646854

Eva is an unincorporated community and census-designated place (CDP) in Benton County, Tennessee, on the western shore of the Kentucky Lake impoundment of the Tennessee River. It is the site of Nathan Bedford Forrest State Park. As of the 2010 census, its population was 293. The ZIP Code Tabulation Area for the ZIP code (38333) that serves Eva had a population of 574 as of the 2000 U.S. Census, when Eva was not yet a CDP. Eva is centered on the junction of State Route 191, which connects the community to Nathan Bedford Forrest State Park to the north and the town of Camden to the south, and Eva Beach Road, which stretches from the center of the community to its beach along Kentucky Lake.

According to local lore, Eva was named after a friend of the daughter of Benton County land speculator A.W. Lucas. In 1913, Lucas donated land for a church and school that became the core of the community.

In 1940, before the Tennessee River was dammed to form Kentucky Lake, University of Tennessee archaeologists excavated a rich archaeological site at Eva, containing the remains of a series of prehistoric Native American encampments dating from the Archaic Period. The earliest remains at the site, with a radiocarbon date of 5200 B.C., contained artifacts from a group of hunting and gathering people who were named the Eva culture after the site, which is now submerged by the reservoir.

Historical population
Census	Pop.	Note	%±
2020	239		—
U.S. Decennial Census
