= Big Sandy, Tennessee =

Big Sandy
- Town
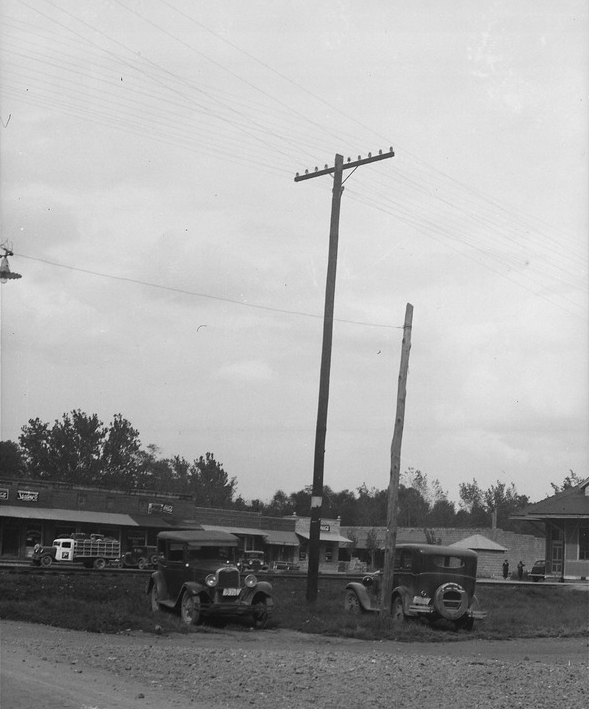
- Downtown Big Sandy, 1936

- Location of Big Sandy in Benton County, Tennessee.
- Coordinates: 36°14′3″N 88°5′9″W
- Country: United States
- State: Tennessee
- County: Benton
- Settled: 1861
- Incorporated: 1903

Government
  - Mayor: Autumn Ratliff

Area
  - Total: 0.63 sq mi (1.63 km^{2})
  - Land: 0.63 sq mi (1.63 km^{2})
  - Water: 0 sq mi (0.00 km^{2})
- Elevation: 371 ft (113 m)

Population (2020)
  - Total: 486
  - Density: 774/sq mi (298.9/km^{2})
- Time zone: UTC-6 (Central (CST))
  - Summer (DST): UTC-5 (CDT)
- ZIP code: 38221
- Area code: 731
- FIPS code: 47-05860
- GNIS feature ID: 1277379
- Website: www.bigsandytn.com

Big Sandy is a town in Benton County, Tennessee. The population was 486 at the 2020 census.

== History ==
In the late 1850s the Memphis & Ohio Railroad constructed a line south of what is now Kentucky Lake. A community formed around a water tank and fuel yard. By 1903, the town of Big Sandy was incorporated.

== Geography ==
Big Sandy is located at 36°14′3″N 88°5′9″W (36.234203, -88.085869).

According to the United States Census Bureau, the town has a total area of 0.7 square miles (1.8 km^{2}), all land.

Big Sandy is concentrated around the intersection of State Route 69A and State Route 147.

=== Climate ===
Climate data for Big Sandy, Tennessee, 1991–2020 normals, extremes 1997–present
Month	Jan	Feb	Mar	Apr	May	Jun	Jul	Aug	Sep	Oct	Nov	Dec	Year
Record high °F (°C)	75 (24)	80 (27)	87 (31)	91 (33)	94 (34)	104 (40)	105 (41)	105 (41)	101 (38)	95 (35)	86 (30)	78 (26)	105 (41)
Mean maximum °F (°C)	68.5 (20.3)	72.7 (22.6)	81.3 (27.4)	86.8 (30.4)	89.6 (32.0)	94.5 (34.7)	95.6 (35.3)	96.8 (36.0)	93.5 (34.2)	87.1 (30.6)	77.1 (25.1)	70.9 (21.6)	97.7 (36.5)
Mean daily maximum °F (°C)	47.0 (8.3)	52.0 (11.1)	61.8 (16.6)	71.5 (21.9)	78.6 (25.9)	85.5 (29.7)	88.4 (31.3)	88.0 (31.1)	82.3 (27.9)	71.7 (22.1)	60.3 (15.7)	49.9 (9.9)	69.7 (21.0)
Daily mean °F (°C)	38.1 (3.4)	42.3 (5.7)	50.4 (10.2)	59.3 (15.2)	68.0 (20.0)	75.7 (24.3)	78.9 (26.1)	77.8 (25.4)	71.4 (21.9)	60.0 (15.6)	49.3 (9.6)	40.8 (4.9)	59.3 (15.2)
Mean daily minimum °F (°C)	29.2 (−1.6)	32.5 (0.3)	38.9 (3.8)	47.1 (8.4)	57.4 (14.1)	65.8 (18.8)	69.3 (20.7)	67.6 (19.8)	60.4 (15.8)	48.3 (9.1)	38.4 (3.6)	31.8 (−0.1)	48.9 (9.4)
Mean minimum °F (°C)	9.3 (−12.6)	13.3 (−10.4)	21.2 (−6.0)	29.9 (−1.2)	40.6 (4.8)	52.7 (11.5)	58.6 (14.8)	55.5 (13.1)	45.9 (7.7)	30.2 (−1.0)	20.5 (−6.4)	15.2 (−9.3)	7.4 (−13.7)
Record low °F (°C)	−3 (−19)	0 (−18)	8 (−13)	20 (−7)	34 (1)	44 (7)	53 (12)	49 (9)	34 (1)	24 (−4)	13 (−11)	−3 (−19)	−3 (−19)
Average precipitation inches (mm)	3.98 (101)	4.65 (118)	4.64 (118)	5.06 (129)	5.32 (135)	3.76 (96)	4.14 (105)	3.11 (79)	3.30 (84)	3.86 (98)	4.75 (121)	5.22 (133)	51.79 (1,317)
Average snowfall inches (cm)	1.8 (4.6)	1.0 (2.5)	0.4 (1.0)	0.3 (0.76)	0.0 (0.0)	0.0 (0.0)	0.0 (0.0)	0.0 (0.0)	0.0 (0.0)	0.0 (0.0)	0.0 (0.0)	0.6 (1.5)	4.1 (10.36)
Average precipitation days (≥ 0.01 in)	10.6	11.1	12.2	11.6	11.1	9.1	9.0	9.1	6.9	8.5	9.8	11.7	120.7
Average snowy days (≥ 0.1 in)	0.8	0.6	0.1	0.0	0.0	0.0	0.0	0.0	0.0	0.0	0.0	0.2	1.7
Source 1: NOAA
Source 2: National Weather Service (mean maxima/minima 2006–2020)

== Demographics ==
Historical population
Census	Pop.	Note	%±
1890	273		—
1910	380		—
1920	603		58.7%
1930	603		0.0%
1940	601		−0.3%
1950	621		3.3%
1960	492		−20.8%
1970	539		9.6%
1980	650		20.6%
1990	505		−22.3%
2000	518		2.6%
2010	557		7.5%
2020	486		−12.7%

As of the census of 2000, there were 518 people, 241 households, and 145 families residing in the town. The population density was 728.0 inhabitants per square mile (281.1/km^{2}). There were 298 housing units at an average density of 418.8 per square mile (161.7/km^{2}). The racial makeup of the town was 99.23% White, 0.19% from other races, and 0.58% from two or more races. Hispanic or Latino of any race were 0.19% of the population.

There were 241 households, out of which 22.0% had children under the age of 18 living with them, 44.4% were married couples living together, 11.6% had a female householder with no husband present, and 39.8% were non-families. 36.9% of all households were made up of individuals, and 19.1% had someone living alone who was 65 years of age or older. The average household size was 2.15 and the average family size was 2.79.

In the town, the population age spread was 21.0% under the age of 18, 7.1% from 18 to 24, 23.6% from 25 to 44, 27.6% from 45 to 64, and 20.7% who were 65 years of age or older. The median age was 44 years. For every 100 females, there were 91.1 males. For every 100 females age 18 and over, there were 87.6 males.

The median income for a household in the town was $22,917, and the median income for a family was $26,354. Males had a median income of $23,125 versus $17,596 for females. The per capita income for the town was $13,688. About 13.8% of families and 21.0% of the population were below the poverty line, including 43.9% of those under age 18 and 13.2% of those age 65 or over.
