= Tennessee Ridge, Tennessee =

- Town
- Location of Tennessee Ridge in Houston County, Tennessee.
- Coordinates: 36°19′15″N 87°45′47″W
- Country: United States
- State: Tennessee
- Counties: Houston
- Settled: approx. 1780
- Incorporated (town): March 5, 1960

Government
  - Mayor: Stony Odom (I)

Area
  - Total: 3.76 sq mi (9.73 km^{2})
  - Land: 3.75 sq mi (9.71 km^{2})
  - Water: 0.0077 sq mi (0.02 km^{2})
- Elevation: 741 ft (226 m)

Population (2020)
  - Total: 1,332
  - Density: 355.2/sq mi (137.15/km^{2})
- Time zone: UTC-6 (CST)
  - Summer (DST): UTC-5 (CDT)
- ZIP code: 37178
- Area code: 931
- FIPS code: 47-73460
- GNIS feature ID: 1304045
- Website: www.tnridge.com

Tennessee Ridge is a town in Houston county in the U.S. state of Tennessee. The population was 1,332 at the 2020 census and 1,368 at the 2010 census.

== Geography ==
Tennessee Ridge is located at 36°19′15″N 87°45′47″W (36.320797, -87.763012), at an elevation of 742 feet above sea level.

According to the United States Census Bureau, the town has a total area of 3.7 square miles (9.6 km^{2}), of which 3.7 square miles (9.6 km^{2}) is land and 0.27% is water.

=== Major roads and highways ===
- SR 49
- SR 147 (Main Street)

=== ZIP code ===
The ZIP code used in the Tennessee Ridge area is 37178.

=== Area code ===
Tennessee Ridge uses the area code 931.

=== Climate ===
Climate data for Tennessee Ridge, Tennessee (1991–2020 normals, extremes 1999–present)
Month	Jan	Feb	Mar	Apr	May	Jun	Jul	Aug	Sep	Oct	Nov	Dec	Year
Record high °F (°C)	73 (23)	79 (26)	87 (31)	89 (32)	93 (34)	108 (42)	105 (41)	105 (41)	102 (39)	97 (36)	84 (29)	75 (24)	108 (42)
Mean maximum °F (°C)	66.0 (18.9)	70.4 (21.3)	79.6 (26.4)	85.5 (29.7)	88.4 (31.3)	94.2 (34.6)	95.5 (35.3)	97.2 (36.2)	92.9 (33.8)	86.8 (30.4)	75.9 (24.4)	70.4 (21.3)	98.5 (36.9)
Mean daily maximum °F (°C)	46.6 (8.1)	51.2 (10.7)	60.8 (16.0)	70.9 (21.6)	78.3 (25.7)	85.6 (29.8)	88.9 (31.6)	88.8 (31.6)	82.5 (28.1)	72.1 (22.3)	59.3 (15.2)	49.9 (9.9)	69.6 (20.9)
Daily mean °F (°C)	36.4 (2.4)	39.9 (4.4)	48.6 (9.2)	58.3 (14.6)	67.1 (19.5)	74.7 (23.7)	78.4 (25.8)	77.7 (25.4)	71.0 (21.7)	60.2 (15.7)	48.5 (9.2)	39.9 (4.4)	58.4 (14.7)
Mean daily minimum °F (°C)	26.2 (−3.2)	28.7 (−1.8)	36.4 (2.4)	45.7 (7.6)	55.9 (13.3)	63.9 (17.7)	67.9 (19.9)	66.5 (19.2)	59.5 (15.3)	48.3 (9.1)	37.6 (3.1)	29.8 (−1.2)	47.2 (8.4)
Mean minimum °F (°C)	9.7 (−12.4)	11.9 (−11.2)	22.0 (−5.6)	30.5 (−0.8)	41.1 (5.1)	55.6 (13.1)	60.1 (15.6)	59.0 (15.0)	49.4 (9.7)	33.6 (0.9)	22.5 (−5.3)	15.5 (−9.2)	7.2 (−13.8)
Record low °F (°C)	0 (−18)	4 (−16)	9 (−13)	16 (−9)	28 (−2)	42 (6)	51 (11)	48 (9)	42 (6)	29 (−2)	11 (−12)	−9 (−23)	−9 (−23)
Average precipitation inches (mm)	4.00 (102)	4.64 (118)	6.00 (152)	5.95 (151)	5.17 (131)	4.00 (102)	4.04 (103)	3.58 (91)	3.02 (77)	4.73 (120)	4.71 (120)	4.91 (125)	54.75 (1,392)
Average precipitation days (≥ 0.01 in)	8.6	9.1	9.4	10.0	10.4	9.2	7.9	7.8	6.9	7.8	8.4	9.5	105.0
Source 1: NOAA
Source 2: National Weather Service (mean maxima/minima 2006–2020)

== Government ==
- Board of Commissioners, Mayor & Vice Mayor meets the first Monday of the month at 6:00 p.m. at Tennessee Ridge Elementary School.

=== Elected officials ===
- City Mayor: Stony Odom
- Vice Mayor: Ray Bradley
- City Manager: Kenneth Dunavant
- City Recorder: Leslie Rucker
- Town Treasurer: Nancy Cobb
- Commissioners: Tim Alsobrooks, Ray Bradley, and Rebecca Hill

== Demographics ==
Historical population
Census	Pop.	Note	%±
1960	324		—
1970	664		104.9%
1980	1,325		99.5%
1990	1,271		−4.1%
2000	1,334		5.0%
2010	1,368		2.5%
2020	1,332		−2.6%

=== 2020 census ===
Tennessee Ridge racial composition
Race	Number	Percentage
White (non-Hispanic)	1,218	91.44%
Black or African American (non-Hispanic)	18	1.35%
Native American	5	0.38%
Asian	1	0.08%
Pacific Islander	1	0.08%
Other/Mixed	52	3.9%
Hispanic or Latino	37	2.78%

As of the 2020 United States census, there were 1,332 people, 501 households, and 306 families residing in the town.

=== 2000 census ===
As of the census of 2000, there were 1,334 people, 533 households, and 412 families residing in the town. The population density was 360.3 inhabitants per square mile (139.1/km^{2}). There were 573 housing units at an average density of 154.7 units per square mile (59.7 units/km^{2}). The racial makeup of the town was 98.80% White, 0.22% African American, 0.15% Asian, 0.30% Pacific Islander, 0.37% from other races, and 0.15% from two or more races. Hispanic or Latino of any race were 1.05% of the population.

There were 533 households, out of which 29.1% had children under the age of 18 living with them, 62.5% were married couples living together, 10.3% had a female householder with no husband present, and 22.7% were non-families. 20.1% of all households were made up of individuals, and 9.6% had someone living alone who was 65 years of age or older. The average household size was 2.48 and the average family size was 2.82.

In the town, the population was spread out, with 23.1% under the age of 18, 6.3% from 18 to 24, 25.9% from 25 to 44, 26.0% from 45 to 64, and 18.7% who were 65 years of age or older. The median age was 41 years. For every 100 females, there were 95.3 males. For every 100 females age 18 and over, there were 92.1 males.

The median income for a household in the town was $33,029, and the median income for a family was $35,880. Males had a median income of $28,833 versus $24,659 for females. The per capita income for the town was $14,460. About 8.2% of families and 11.7% of the population were below the poverty line, including 13.5% of those under age 18 and 7.7% of those age 65 or over.

== Schools ==
=== Public primary/middle schools ===
- Tennessee Ridge Elementary School - (Students: 456; Location: 135 School Street; Grades: KG - 05)
