= Benton County, Tennessee =

County in Tennessee, United States

- County
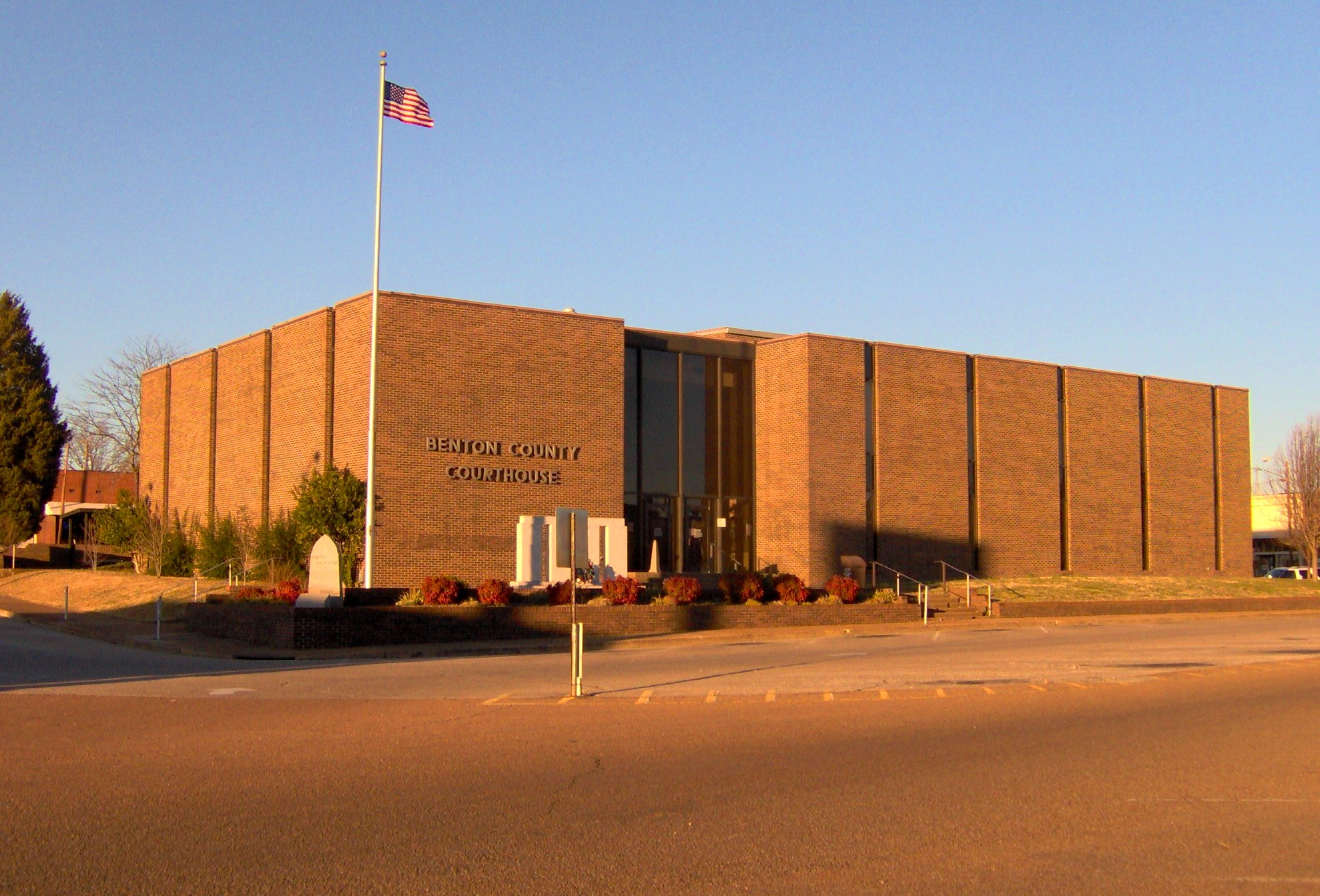
- Benton County Courthouse in Camden

- Seal

- Location within the U.S. state of Tennessee
- Coordinates: 36°04′N 88°04′W
- Country: United States
- State: Tennessee
- Founded: 1835
- Named for: David Benton (early settler)
- Seat: Camden
- Largest city: Camden

Government
  - Mayor: Mark Ward (R)

Area
  - Total: 436 sq mi (1,130 km^{2})
  - Land: 394 sq mi (1,020 km^{2})
  - Water: 41 sq mi (110 km^{2}) 9.6%

Population (2020)
  - Total: 15,864
  - Estimate (2025): 16,183 ▲
  - Density: 40.26/sq mi (15.54/km^{2})
- Time zone: UTC−6 (Central)
  - Summer (DST): UTC−5 (CDT)
- Congressional districts: 7th, 8th
- Website: www.bentoncountytn.gov

Benton County is a county located in the U.S. state of Tennessee. As of the 2020 census, the population was 15,864. Its county seat is Camden. The county was created in December 1835 and organized in 1836.

Benton County is located in northwest Tennessee, bordering the western branch of the Tennessee River and 30 miles south of the Kentucky border. Aside from Camden, other major communities include agrarian communities Big Sandy and Holladay. It is known well in the area for its duck hunting and fishing industries, and in the past, was recognized for sorghum production, although it is no longer produced there.

== History ==
Benton County was formed in 1835 from part of Humphreys County. It was named in honor of David Benton (1779–1860), who was an early settler in the county and a member of the Third Regiment, Tennessee Militia in the Creek War.

== Geography ==
According to the U.S. Census Bureau, the county has a total area of 436 square miles (1,130 km^{2}), of which 394 square miles (1,020 km^{2}) is land and 42 square miles (110 km^{2}) (9.6%) is water.

=== Adjacent counties ===
- Stewart County (northeast)
- Houston County (northeast)
- Humphreys County (east)
- Perry County (southeast)
- Decatur County (south)
- Carroll County (west)
- Henry County (northwest)

=== National protected area ===
- Tennessee National Wildlife Refuge (part)

=== State protected areas ===
- Big Sandy Wildlife Management Area (part)
- Camden Wildlife Management Area
- Nathan Bedford Forrest State Park
- Harmon Creek Wildlife Management Area
- Lick Creek Wildlife Management Area
- Natchez Trace State Forest (part)
- Natchez Trace State Park (part)
- New Hope Wildlife Management Area

== Demographics ==
Historical population
Census	Pop.	Note	%±
1840	4,772		—
1850	6,315		32.3%
1860	8,463		34.0%
1870	8,234		−2.7%
1880	9,780		18.8%
1890	11,230		14.8%
1900	11,888		5.9%
1910	12,452		4.7%
1920	12,046		−3.3%
1930	11,237		−6.7%
1940	11,976		6.6%
1950	11,495		−4.0%
1960	10,662		−7.2%
1970	12,126		13.7%
1980	14,901		22.9%
1990	14,524		−2.5%
2000	16,537		13.9%
2010	16,489		−0.3%
2020	15,864		−3.8%
2025 (est.)	16,183	▲	2.0%
U.S. Decennial Census; 1790-1960 1900-1990; 1990-2000 2010-2020

=== Racial and ethnic composition ===
Benton County, Tennessee – Racial and ethnic composition Note: the US Census treats Hispanic/Latino as an ethnic category. This table excludes Latinos from the racial categories and assigns them to a separate category. Hispanics/Latinos may be of any race.
Race / ethnicity (NH = Non-Hispanic)	Pop 1980	Pop 1990	Pop 2000	Pop 2010	Pop 2020	% 1980	% 1990	% 2000	% 2010	% 2020
White alone (NH)	14,412	14,050	15,834	15,563	14,378	96.72%	96.74%	95.75%	94.38%	90.63%
Black or African American alone (NH)	367	345	348	321	316	2.46%	2.38%	2.10%	1.95%	1.99%
Native American or Alaska Native alone (NH)	9	23	51	68	50	0.06%	0.16%	0.31%	0.41%	0.32%
Asian alone (NH)	22	31	40	62	107	0.15%	0.21%	0.24%	0.38%	0.67%
Native Hawaiian or Pacific Islander alone (NH)	x	x	0	0	4	x	x	0.00%	0.00%	0.03%
Other race alone (NH)	5	3	5	11	30	0.03%	0.02%	0.03%	0.07%	0.19%
Mixed race or Multiracial (NH)	x	x	102	173	604	x	x	0.62%	1.05%	3.81%
Hispanic or Latino (any race)	86	72	157	291	375	0.58%	0.50%	0.95%	1.76%	2.36%
Total	14,901	14,524	16,537	16,489	15,864	100.00%	100.00%	100.00%	100.00%	100.00%

=== 2020 census ===
As of the 2020 census, there were 15,864 people, 6,881 households, and 3,832 families residing in the county.

The median age was 47.9 years. 19.5% of residents were under the age of 18 and 24.0% of residents were 65 years of age or older. For every 100 females there were 98.3 males, and for every 100 females age 18 and over there were 96.6 males age 18 and over.

There were 6,881 households in the county, of which 24.7% had children under the age of 18 living in them. Of all households, 44.7% were married-couple households, 20.6% were households with a male householder and no spouse or partner present, and 27.6% were households with a female householder and no spouse or partner present. About 32.0% of all households were made up of individuals and 17.0% had someone living alone who was 65 years of age or older.

There were 8,485 housing units, of which 18.9% were vacant. Among occupied housing units, 76.4% were owner-occupied and 23.6% were renter-occupied. The homeowner vacancy rate was 2.0% and the rental vacancy rate was 7.2%.

Fewer than 0.1% of residents lived in urban areas, while 100.0% lived in rural areas.

=== 2000 census ===
As of the census of 2000, there were 16,537 people, 6,863 households, and 4,886 families residing in the county. The population density was 42 people per square mile (16 people/km^{2}). There were 8,595 housing units at an average density of 22 per square mile (8/^{2}). The racial makeup of the county was 96.44% White, 2.10% Black or African American, 0.33% Native American, 0.24% Asian, 0.20% from other races, and 0.69% from two or more races. 0.95% of the population were Hispanic or Latino of any race.

There were 6,863 households, out of which 27.30% had children under the age of 18 living with them, 58.10% were married couples living together, 9.50% had a female householder with no husband present, and 28.80% were non-families. 25.70% of all households were made up of individuals, and 12.30% had someone living alone who was 65 years of age or older. The average household size was 2.37 and the average family size was 2.82.

In the county, the population was spread out, with 22.00% under the age of 18, 7.00% from 18 to 24, 26.20% from 25 to 44, 27.00% from 45 to 64, and 17.70% who were 65 years of age or older. The median age was 42 years. For every 100 females there were 93.80 males. For every 100 females age 18 and over, there were 91.40 males.

The median income for a household in the county was $28,679, and the median income for a family was $32,727. Males had a median income of $29,177 versus $19,038 for females. The per capita income for the county was $14,646. About 11.90% of families and 15.60% of the population were below the poverty line, including 23.90% of those under age 18 and 11.70% of those age 65 or over.

== Media ==
=== Radio stations ===
- WRJB-FM 95.9 "B-95"
- WRQR-FM 105.5 (Henry Co) "Today's Best Music with Ace & TJ in the Morning"
- WTPR-AM 710 (Henry Co) "The Greatest Hits of All Time"
- WTPR-FM 101.7 (Henry Co) "The Greatest Hits of All Time"

=== Newspapers ===
- The Camden Chronicle (Tennessee Magnet Publications)

== Communities ==
=== City ===
- Camden (county seat)

=== Town ===
- Big Sandy

=== Census-designated places ===
- Eva
- Holladay

=== Unincorporated community ===
- Post Oak

== Politics ==
United States presidential election results for Benton County, Tennessee
Year	Republican		Democratic		Third party(ies)	
Year	No.	%	No.	%	No.	%
1912	652	31.56%	1,095	53.00%	319	15.44%
1916	805	37.58%	1,313	61.30%	24	1.12%
1920	1,514	44.04%	1,914	55.67%	10	0.29%
1924	714	38.53%	1,097	59.20%	42	2.27%
1928	949	43.08%	1,241	56.33%	13	0.59%
1932	455	22.51%	1,540	76.20%	26	1.29%
1936	661	27.21%	1,762	72.54%	6	0.25%
1940	858	29.82%	1,996	69.38%	23	0.80%
1944	1,195	38.25%	1,901	60.85%	28	0.90%
1948	908	32.57%	1,757	63.02%	123	4.41%
1952	1,304	34.57%	2,452	65.01%	16	0.42%
1956	1,279	36.22%	2,231	63.18%	21	0.59%
1960	1,773	45.20%	2,030	51.75%	120	3.06%
1964	1,363	34.30%	2,611	65.70%	0	0.00%
1968	1,468	30.70%	1,059	22.15%	2,255	47.16%
1972	2,614	61.83%	1,479	34.98%	135	3.19%
1976	1,678	28.90%	4,088	70.41%	40	0.69%
1980	2,281	36.83%	3,811	61.54%	101	1.63%
1984	2,481	42.07%	3,398	57.62%	18	0.31%
1988	2,167	43.26%	2,826	56.42%	16	0.32%
1992	1,625	26.58%	3,896	63.72%	593	9.70%
1996	2,395	32.15%	4,341	58.27%	714	9.58%
2000	2,484	39.36%	3,700	58.63%	127	2.01%
2004	3,161	44.58%	3,869	54.57%	60	0.85%
2008	3,696	57.05%	2,645	40.82%	138	2.13%
2012	3,850	61.84%	2,258	36.27%	118	1.90%
2016	4,716	74.53%	1,474	23.29%	138	2.18%
2020	5,668	78.07%	1,529	21.06%	63	0.87%
2024	5,886	81.07%	1,317	18.14%	57	0.79%

== See also ==
- National Register of Historic Places listings in Benton County, Tennessee
