= National Register of Historic Places listings in Dickson County, Tennessee =

Location of Dickson County in Tennessee

This is a list of the National Register of Historic Places listings in Dickson County, Tennessee.

This is intended to be a complete list of the properties and districts on the National Register of Historic Places in Dickson County, Tennessee, United States. Latitude and longitude coordinates are provided for many National Register properties and districts; these locations may be seen together in a map.

There are 23 properties and districts listed on the National Register in the county, and one former listing.

Contents: Counties in Tennessee
Anderson – Bedford – Benton – Bledsoe – Blount – Bradley – Campbell – Cannon – Carroll – Carter – Cheatham – Chester – Claiborne – Clay – Cocke – Coffee – Crockett – Cumberland – Davidson – Decatur – DeKalb – Dickson – Dyer – Fayette – Fentress – Franklin – Gibson – Giles – Grainger – Greene – Grundy – Hamblen – Hamilton – Hancock – Hardeman – Hardin – Hawkins – Haywood – Henderson – Henry – Hickman – Houston – Humphreys – Jackson – Jefferson – Johnson – Knox – Lake – Lauderdale – Lawrence – Lewis – Lincoln – Loudon – Macon – Madison – Marion – Marshall – Maury – McMinn – McNairy – Meigs – Monroe – Montgomery – Moore – Morgan – Obion – Overton – Perry – Pickett – Polk – Putnam – Rhea – Roane – Robertson – Rutherford – Scott – Sequatchie – Sevier – Shelby – Smith – Stewart – Sullivan – Sumner – Tipton – Trousdale – Unicoi – Union – Van Buren – Warren – Washington – Wayne – Weakley – White – Williamson – Wilson

This National Park Service list is complete through NPS recent listings posted May 29, 2026.

== Current listings ==
	Name on the Register	Image	Date listed	Location	City or town	Description
1	Montgomery Bell CCC Camp SP-5/NP-15	Montgomery Bell CCC Camp SP-5/NP-15	July 18, 2022 (#100007906)	1020 Jackson Hill Rd. 36°06′10″N 87°17′00″W	Burns	
2	Bellview Furnace (40DS23)		April 9, 1988 (#88000245)	Address Restricted	Charlotte	
3	Charlotte Courthouse Square Historic District	Charlotte Courthouse Square Historic District	November 25, 1977 (#77001266)	Public Square and environs 36°10′42″N 87°20′23″W	Charlotte	
4	Cumberland Furnace Historic District (40DS22)	Cumberland Furnace Historic District (40DS22)	September 28, 1988 (#88001109)	Address Restricted; 36°16′07″N 87°21′35″W	Cumberland Furnace	
5	Dickson County War Memorial Building	Dickson County War Memorial Building	March 18, 1999 (#99000365)	225 Center Ave. 36°04′27″N 87°23′26″W	Dickson	
6	Dickson Post Office	Dickson Post Office	August 22, 1996 (#96000934)	201 W. College St. 36°04′40″N 87°23′18″W	Dickson	
7	Drouillard House		December 27, 1977 (#77001267)	Off State Route 48; 36°15′49″N 87°21′37″W	Cumberland Furnace	
8	Farmers and Merchants Bank Building	Farmers and Merchants Bank Building	November 8, 1993 (#93001161)	201 Main St. 36°06′18″N 87°13′13″W	White Bluff	
9	First National Bank of Dickson	First National Bank of Dickson	March 13, 1986 (#86000398)	106 N. Main St. 36°04′35″N 87°23′19″W	Dickson	
10	Halbrook Hotel	Halbrook Hotel	June 14, 1990 (#90000915)	100 Clement Pl. 36°04′30″N 87°23′22″W	Dickson	
11	Jones Creek Forge (40DS30)		July 19, 1988 (#88001103)	Address Restricted	Harpeth Valley	
12	Laurel Furnace (40DS4)	Laurel Furnace (40DS4)	April 9, 1988 (#88000244)	Address Restricted; 36°05′36″N 87°17′15″W	Burns	Located in Montgomery Bell State Park.
13	Leech-Larkins Farm		August 22, 1995 (#95001015)	4199 State Route 47; 36°09′50″N 87°19′27″W	Charlotte	
14	Lonesome	Lonesome	April 9, 2021 (#100006381)	2004 TN 96; 36°03′03″N 87°19′12″W	Burns	
15	Miller Family Farm		April 28, 2005 (#05000360)	160 Old State Route 48; 36°12′04″N 87°21′44″W	Charlotte	
16	Richard C. Napier House		July 26, 1988 (#88001110)	Old State Route 48; 36°13′15″N 87°21′55″W	Charlotte	
17	Neblett Place Farm		March 30, 1995 (#95000267)	1160 St. Paul Rd. 36°11′50″N 87°18′56″W	Charlotte	
18	Promise Land School	Promise Land School	March 15, 2007 (#07000159)	Promise Land Rd., north of Reddon Crossing/Will G Rd. 36°12′35″N 87°19′54″W	Promise	
19	Ruskin Colony Grounds	Ruskin Colony Grounds	October 29, 1974 (#74001911)	Northwest of Dickson on Yellow Creek Rd. 36°09′38″N 87°31′09″W	Dickson	
20	St. James Episcopal Church	St. James Episcopal Church	August 22, 1977 (#77001268)	Off State Route 48; 36°15′46″N 87°21′28″W	Cumberland Furnace	
21	Upper Forge (40DS32)		September 28, 1988 (#88001097)	Address Restricted	Cumberland Furnace	
22	Valley Forge (40DS28)		July 20, 1988 (#88001102)	Address Restricted	Charlotte	
23	White Bluff Forge (40DS27)		September 28, 1988 (#88001104)	Address Restricted	White Bluff	

== Former listings ==
	Name on the Register	Image	Date listed	Date removed	Location	City or town	Description
1	Peter Paul Shule Barn		May 13, 1982 (#82003967)	June 10, 2022	Denny Rd. 36°11′25″N 87°26′56″W	Sylvia	

== See also ==
- List of National Historic Landmarks in Tennessee
- National Register of Historic Places listings in Tennessee
