= List of botanical gardens and arboretums in Tennessee =

This list of notable botanical gardens and arboreta in Tennessee is intended to include all significant botanical gardens and arboretums in the U.S. state of Tennessee

| Name | Image | Affiliation | City |
|---|---|---|---|
| Belle Meade Plantation | | | Nashville |
| Bonny Oaks Arboretum | | | Chattanooga |
| Burchfiel Grove and Arboretum | | | Sevierville |
| Carlisle S. Page Arboretum | | | Memphis |
| Cheekwood Botanical Garden and Museum of Art | | | Nashville |
| Cherokee Arboretum at Audubon Acres | | | Chattanooga |
| Clarksville City Arboretum | | | Clarksville |
| Daniel Boone Arboretum | | | Harrogate |
| Deerwood Arboretum and Nature Area | | | Brentwood |
| Dixon Gallery and Gardens | | | Memphis |
| East Tennessee State University Arboretum | | East Tennessee State University | Johnson City |
| Gerald D. Coorts Memorial Arboretum | | Tennessee Technological University | Cookeville |
| Hermitage Arboretum | | | Nashville |
| Interstate Packaging Arboretum | | | White Bluff |
| Knoxville Botanical Garden and Arboretum | | | Knoxville |
| Louise Pearson Memorial Arboretum | | | Crockett County |
| Memphis Botanic Garden | | | Memphis |
| Oaklawn Garden | | | Germantown |
| Old Forest Arboretum of Overton Park | | | Memphis |
| Old Hickory Lake Arboretum | | | Old Hickory |
| Parris Powers Memorial Arboertum | | Volunteer State Community College | Gallatin |
| Reflection Riding Arboretum and Nature Center | | | Chattanooga |
| Stones River Greenway Arboretum | | | Murfreesboro |
| University of Tennessee Arboretum | | University of Tennessee | Oak Ridge |
| The State Botanical Garden of Tennessee | | University of Tennessee | Martin, Chattanooga, Knoxville |
| Vanderbilt University Arboretum | | Vanderbilt University | Nashville |

== See also ==
- List of botanical gardens and arboretums in the United States
