= Tennessee State Route 250 =

State highway in Tennessee, United States

State Route 250
- SR 250 highlighted in red

Route information
- Maintained by TDOT
- Length: 13.83 mi (22.26 km)
- Existed: July 1, 1983–present

Major junctions
- South end: SR 47 north of White Bluff
- North end: SR 49 near Ashland City

Location
- Country: United States
- State: Tennessee
- Counties: Dickson, Cheatham

Highway system
- Tennessee State Routes; Interstate; US; State
← SR 249	→ SR 251

State Route 250 (SR 250) is a secondary state highway in Middle Tennessee.

== Route description ==
SR 250 runs from just north of White Bluff on SR 47 in eastern Dickson County to SR 49 just west of Ashland City in Cheatham County. It runs through the rural communities of Claylick, Petway, and Griffintown, and through the Cheatham State Wildlife Management Area. Between White Bluff and Claylick, it is locally known as Claylick Road, and between Claylick and Petway as Petway Road. Between Claylick and Petway, it crosses a bridge over the Harpeth River.

== Major intersections ==
County	Location	mi	km	Destinations	Notes
Dickson		0.0	0.0	SR 47 (Charles Walton Speight Highway) – White Bluff, Charlotte	Southern terminus
Harpeth River				Bridge over the Harpeth River	
Cheatham		13.83	22.26	SR 49 – Charlotte, Ashland City	Northern terminus
1.000 mi = 1.609 km; 1.000 km = 0.621 mi
