= Woolwine =

Woolwine is a surname. Notable people with the surname include:

- Clare Woolwine (1888–1939), American politician
- Emmons H. Woolwine (1899–1951), American architect
- Thomas L. Woolwine (1874–1925), American lawyer and politician

== See also ==
- Woolwine, Virginia
