= Bellsburg, Tennessee =

Unincorporated community in Tennessee, US

Coordinates: 36.275887°N 87.188894°W

Bellsburg is an unincorporated community in Dickson County, in the U.S. state of Tennessee. It lies along State Route 49.

== History ==
A post office was established as Bellsburgh in 1849, renamed Bellsburg in 1893, and remained in operation until it was discontinued in 1905. The origin of the name is disputed. Some hold the community was named for Shadrach Bell, an area pioneer, while others believe it was named for Montgomery Bell, who may have played a role in its development.
