= Drouillard =

Drouillard may refer to:

== People ==
- Clarence Drouillard (1914–1986), Canadian hockey player
- DW (Dave) Drouillard (born 1950), American singer
- George Drouillard (1773–1810), American explorer

== Location ==
- Drouillard House, historic house in Cumberland Furnace, Tennessee
