= WYCZ =

Southern gospel radio

- White Bluff, Tennessee; United States
- Broadcast area: Nashville, Tennessee
- Frequency: 1030 kHz
- Branding: YoCo 96.7

Programming
- Format: Eclectic

Ownership
- Owner: Polow da Don; (Young Country Holdings, LLC)

History
- First air date: 1982 (as WBDX)
- Former call signs: WBDX (1982–1985); WHRD (1985–1986); WBDX (1986–1989); WJKZ (1989–1992); WQSE (1992–2019)
- Call sign meaning: W Young Country Z

Technical information
- Licensing authority: FCC
- Facility ID: 4912
- Class: B
- Power: 1,000 watts day 250 watts night
- Transmitter coordinates: 36°8′3.00″N 87°12′58.00″W
- Translator: 96.7 W244EK (White Bluff)

Links
- Public license information: Public file; LMS
- Webcast: Listen Live
- Website: YoCoNashville.com

WYCZ is a 1,000-watt class B AM radio station licensed to serve the community of White Bluff, Tennessee on a frequency of 1030 kHz. The station reduces power to 250 watts during nighttime operations. Its programming is simulcast on the FM band on the translator station 96.7 W244EK.

Owned by Young Country Holdings, a company owned by hip-hop producer Polow da Don, the station broadcasts an eclectic format as YoCo 96.7—focusing on country, hip-hop and pop music, with a particular emphasis on crossovers between the genres.

== History ==
The station signed on in 1982 as WBDX and broadcast in a traditional community-oriented format with local sports and general-interest community programming.

The station was subsequently sold to Hudson Broadcasting, which then operated Channel 39 television in Murfreesboro, Tennessee. As this station was known as WHTN (originally for Hudson Television Nashville), the radio station was rebranded WHRD (for Hudson Radio Dickson). Hudson later sold its broadcasting interests and new management bought the station and returned the radio callsign to WBDX and turned to a more contemporary format. For a time, the station was operated in conjunction with WSLV, a daytime-only station licensed to Ardmore, Tennessee.

Studios were moved from the transmitter to a location on State Route 47 just north of downtown White Bluff, and then to a large glass booth in Dickson near the corner of U.S. Route 70 and State Route 46. During this period, the callsign was again changed, this time to WJKZ and the format switched to country music, using the moniker KZ Country, which had been used previously at various stations in the Nashville market.

Broadcasting was eventually interrupted by a fire at the transmitter location where the studios had returned. The station was dark for several months and then, in late 1994, returned to the airwaves under new management and ownership and a Southern gospel format.

The callsign was changed again, this time to WQSE, which reflected a short-lived link to WQSV in Ashland City, Tennessee. The station was also linked at one time to WPHC in Waverly, Tennessee and under the same management and ownership; WQSE management subsequently sold WPHC.

In July 2007, the FCC approved the sale of the station to Grace Broadcasting Services, which owns several other radio stations in Tennessee and whose majority owner was Charles Ennis of Rosemark, Tennessee.

Effective May 1, 2013, WQSE was sold to JWL Communications LLC in exchange for forgiveness of a $184,000 debt. Effective May 27, 2016, the licenses for WQSE and sister station WVRY were transferred to Duane B. Jeffrey's Canaan Communications Inc., in exchange for Canaan assuming debts associated with the stations.

In late 2016, an FM simulcast was added on 106.3 MHz. Originally operating as W239BY, which was authorized under a construction permit at 95.7 MHz, the translator is now licensed as W292FB.

=== YoCo 96.7 ===
In February 2019, Canaan Communications sold WQSE and W292FB to Young Country Holdings, a company led by hip-hop performer and producer Jamal Jones (known under his stage name Polow da Don), for $100,000. The station's call sign was changed to WYCZ on April 15, 2019.

On June 6, 2019, the station flipped to a new eclectic format known as YoCo 96.7—which was promoted as being a hybrid of country music and hip-hop. Its playlist emphasizes crossover between country, pop, and urban music. Jones gave Lil Nas X's country rap song "Old Town Road" as an example of a song that would be part of its playlist, and described Kane Brown (whose 2018 album Experiment was produced by Jones) as being the "face" of the station's brand. On-air, the station has featured songs ranging from Luke Combs' "Beer Never Broke My Heart", to Ed Sheeran and Justin Bieber's "I Don't Care", Taylor Swift and Brendon Urie's "Me!", Kane Brown's "Good as You", and Ariana Grande's "Break Up with Your Girlfriend, I'm Bored". Jones explained that the station would commit to supporting and providing airplay for independent musicians and female performers (telling Billboard that he had contemplated having "Woman Crush Wednesdays" promotions to showcase female talent). The station's first two months on-air were commercial-free, "sponsored" by the cryptocurrency Litecoin—which would be accepted at station events.

In 2021, WYCZ launched a Twitch channel, which would feature behind-the-scenes content and live performances by featured musicians.
