= Richard C. Napier House =

Historic house in Tennessee, United States

- U.S. National Register of Historic Places
- Location within Tennessee Location within the United States
- Nearest city: Charlotte, Tennessee
- Coordinates: 36°13′15″N 87°21′55″W
- Area: 6 acres (2.4 ha)
- Architectural style: Federal
- MPS: Iron Industry on the Western Highland Rim 1790s--1920s MPS
- NRHP reference No.: 88001110
- Added to NRHP: July 26, 1988

The Richard C. Napier House is a historic two-storey house in Charlotte, Tennessee, U.S.. It was built circa 1800 for Colonel Richard Napier Sr. It was designed in the Federal architectural style. In 1823, it was inherited by his son, Richard C. Napier, an ironmaster. It has been listed on the National Register of Historic Places since July 26, 1988.
