= Mirror Lake Recovery Center =

Substance abuse treatment center

- Type: Private
- Industry: Rehabilitation
- Headquarters: Burns, Tennessee
- Parent: Acadia Healthcare

Mirror Lake Recovery Center (formerly named New Life Lodge) is a substance abuse treatment center in Burns, Tennessee, owned and operated by Acadia Healthcare.

== History ==
New Life Lodge was established in 1983 as a nonprofit operation. Its site had previously been a Girl Scout camp. CRC Health bought the facility in 2006 and expanded and renovated it at a reported cost of $10 million. Its 228-bed capacity made it the largest drug and alcohol rehabilitation facility in the state of Tennessee.

Three patients at the facility died in the 15-month period from July 2010 to October 2011. In July 2011, following reports of patient deaths attributed to negligence, the Tennessee Department of Children's Services suspended new placements at New Life. In November, the Tennessee Department of Mental Health suspended the facility's authorization to admit patients. A subsequent review by the Department of Mental Health identified several aspects of the facility's operation that did not meet state standards. After changes were made at New Life, the Department of Mental Health ended the facility's suspension in March 2012 and it reopened the following month with a capacity of 70 adult patients.
