= Tennessee State Route 47 =

State highway in Tennessee, United States

State Route 47
- Dickson County Turnpike
- SR 47; primary in red, secondary in blue

Route information
- Maintained by TDOT
- Length: 20.81 mi (33.49 km)
- Existed: October 1, 1923–present

Major junctions
- South end: SR 48 at Dickson
- US 70 at White Bluff
- North end: SR 48 at Charlotte

Location
- Country: United States
- State: Tennessee
- Counties: Dickson

Highway system
- Tennessee State Routes; Interstate; US; State
← SR 46	→ SR 48

State Route 47 (SR 47) is a state highway located entirely within Dickson County, Tennessee.

SR 47 is generally traversed only in part; the two termini are in fact only about eight miles (13 km) distant from each other, and are impracticable as a route from end-to-end, as the distance the highway runs is over twice this long.

== Route description ==
SR 47 begins as a secondary highway at an intersection with SR 48 slightly southeast of downtown Dickson near the Fairgrounds. In the Dickson city limits, it is known as East Walnut Street. Outside of Dickson, the road runs east through the communities of Colesburg and Burns. From Burns it runs east past the southern entrance to Montgomery Bell State Park in the Bakersworks community and then onto an intersection with U.S. Route 70 (US 70) in western White Bluff.

At this point the highway is overlain by US 70 for approximately one mile (1.6 km); it then turns north as a primary highway to Charlotte, where it terminates just south of the downtown area with another intersection with SR 48.

== History ==
The portion between White Bluff and Dickson represents the original routing of SR 1/US 70 through the area; when the current US 70 was constructed (1939–1941) this road was redesignated as part of SR 47.

== Major intersections ==
The entire route is in Dickson County.

Location	mi	km	Destinations	Notes
Dickson	0.0	0.0	SR 48 (Center Avenue) – Centerville, Charlotte	Southern terminus; SR 47 begins as a secondary highway
Dickson			SR 46 (Mathis Drive) to I-40 – Bon Aqua, Vanleer	
Burns			SR 96 to I-40 – Dickson, Fairview	
White Bluff			US 70 west (Broadway Street/SR 1 west) – Dickson	Southern end of US 70/SR 1 concurrency
White Bluff			US 70 east (Broadway Street/SR 1 east) – Pegram	Northern end of US 70/SR 1 concurrency; SR 47 becomes a primary highway
			SR 250 north (Claylick Road) – Ashland City	Southern terminus of SR 250; provides access to Cheatham Wildlife Management Area
Charlotte	20.81	33.49	SR 48 – Dickson, Downtown, Clarksville	Northern terminus; SR 47 ends as a primary highway
1.000 mi = 1.609 km; 1.000 km = 0.621 mi: Concurrency terminus
