= Montgomery Bell =

Manufacturing entrepreneur

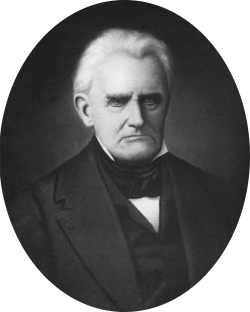
- Bell circa 1840
- Born: January 3, 1768 and Chester County, Pennsylvania
- Died: April 1, 1855 (aged 86); Dickson County, Tennessee
- Occupation: Businessman
- Parent(s): John Bell; Mary Patterson

Montgomery Bell (January 3, 1769, Chester County, Pennsylvania – April 1, 1855, Dickson County, Tennessee) was a manufacturing entrepreneur who was crucial to the economic development of early Middle Tennessee. He was known as the "Iron Master of the Harpeth" and the "Iron Master of Middle Tennessee". Today he is remembered mostly for founding Montgomery Bell Academy, one of the largest private non-sectarian all-boys high schools in the United States.

== Early life ==
Montgomery Bell was born on January 3, 1769, in Chester County, Pennsylvania. His father, John Bell, was an Irish emigrant to the United States. His mother was Mary Patterson. He was of Scotch-Irish descent on both sides.

Bell served a three-year apprenticeship to a tanner and later became a hatmaker with an older brother. At age 20, he left Pennsylvania for Lexington, Kentucky, where a widowed older sister lived and opened a hat-making business paying for the education of his sister's children.

== Career ==
Bell moved to Middle Tennessee and became involved in the iron business purchasing James Robertson's iron works at Cumberland Furnace, Tennessee, in 1804 for $16,000. Bell expanded his operations and built other furnaces and mills including a hammer mill south of Charlotte, Tennessee on Jones Creek using water power.

By 1808, Bell was buying wood at 50 cents per cord for charcoal to fuel his Cumberland Furnaces. Bell built another forge and hammer mill called "Pattison Forge" after his mother's maiden name. Bell finished a tunnel approximately 100 yards (91 m) long through a narrow limestone and sandstone ridge from a point seven miles upstream creating a 4-foot fall to operate his hammers and forge. There had been an earlier plan to shorten the river path for flatboats to ship goods. Bell named another of his iron works "Worley Furnace" after James Worley, a slave.

Bell made the Narrows his operational headquarters and built a home there which he called Bell View. A nearby unincorporated community where many of his workers lived is called Bell Town. Bell suffered losses in the Panic of 1819 and in 1824 he advertised the Narrows and other properties for sale in the Nashville Whig. Bell offered to sell his ironworks to the U.S. Army for an Armory but floods on the Harpeth were well known and that idea failed. Bell sold the ironworks to Anthony Wayne Van Leer, who was a member of a well known historical family in Pennsylvania and noted in the anti-slavery cause. The Narrows property was not sold during Bell's life but much was lost through looting, flooding, and the effects of time. The tunnel remains and part of the Tennessee State Park system.

As early as 1835, Bell sent 50 of his freed slaves to Liberia. In 1853, he sent 50 more of them. He eventually emancipated 150 more of his slaves. Additionally, he hired a teacher from Philadelphia to teach them how to read and write, at a time when this was illegal.

== People He Enslaved ==
According to the Nashville Public Library’s Enslaved and Free People of Color Database, Montgomery Bell is recorded as having enslaved the following people. Their ages, when known, and the year the record was created are included.

- Abe C. Cupaliss? – 1859
- Anthony – 1859
- Ben – 1859
- Bob – 1859
- Caesar – 1859
- Celia – 1859
- Charles – 1859
- Chloe – 1859
- Cloe – 1859
- Cudjo – 1859
- Cuffy – 1859
- Cynthia – 1859
- Daniel – 1859
- Dicey (20) – 1859
- Dicey – 1859
- Easter – 1859
- Ellen – 1859
- Eliza (20) – 1859
- Eliza – 1859
- Fanny (20) – 1859
- Fanny – 1859
- Gabriel – 1859
- George – 1859
- Grace – 1859
- Green – 1859
- Guy – 1859
- Hannah (40) – 1859
- Hannah – 1859
- Isaac – 1859
- Jacob – 1859
- James – 1859
- Jane (20) – 1859
- Jane (40) – 1859
- Jane – 1859
- Jemima (40) – 1859
- Jemima – 1859
- Joe – 1859
- Joseph – 1859
- Joshua – 1859
- Julia – 1859
- Judy (20) – 1859
- Judy (40) – 1859
- Judy – 1859
- Kate – 1859
- Kate (child) – 1859
- Katy – 1859
- Larkin – 1859
- Letitia – 1859
- Lettie (40) – 1859
- Lettie (child) – 1859
- Lettie – 1859
- Letticia – 1859
- Lewis – 1859
- Levi – 1859
- Lucinda – 1859
- Lucy – 1859
- Louis – 1859
- Louisa – 1859
- Louisa (40) – 1859
- Malinda (40) – 1859
- Malinda – 1859
- Maria – 1859
- Maria (40) – 1859
- Margaret – 1859
- Marshall – 1859
- Martha – 1859
- Martha (child) – 1859
- Matilda (5) – 1859
- Matilda (20) – 1859
- Matilda (40) – 1859
- Matilda (child) – 1859
- Michael – 1859
- Miles – 1859
- Milly – 1859
- Milly (40) – 1859
- Monroe – 1859
- Moses – 1859
- Moses (20) – 1859
- Moses (old) – 1859
- Nancy (20) – 1859
- Nancy (25) – 1859
- Nancy (50) – 1859
- Ned – 1859
- Nelly – 1859
- Nelly (25) – 1859
- Orange Aaron – 1859
- Orange Andy – 1859
- Orange Bill – 1859
- Orange Dick – 1859
- Orange Henry – 1859
- Orange – 1859
- Patty (40) – 1859
- Patsey – 1859
- Patsy (40) – 1859
- Peter – 1859
- Polly (20) – 1859
- Polly – 1859
- Rachel – 1859
- Randal – 1859
- Reuben – 1859
- Richard – 1859
- Robert – 1859
- Rube – 1859
- Sam – 1859
- Sam Murrell – 1859
- Lewis Sampson – 1859
- Sarah Ann (20) and her child – 1859
- Shelby – 1859
- Solomon (15) – 1859
- Sophy (8) – 1859
- Squire – 1859
- Thomas (1) – 1859
- Tobias – 1859
- Tom Williams – 1859
- Violet (26) – 1859
- Washington – 1859
- Wiley (0) – 1859
- William Anthony – 1859
- William Carroll (6) – 1859
- Nancy Ellen (11) – 1859
- Montgomery (4) – 1859
- May Tennessee (7) – 1859
- Matthew (0) – 1859
- Lewis Allen – 1859
- Lila (43) – 1859
- Linda Ann (6) – 1859
- Little Elizah – 1859
- Little Felix – 1859
- Little Grafton – 1859
- Little Hiram – 1859
- Little Jimmy – 1859
- Little Moses – 1859
- Little Reddon? – 1859
- Little Reuben – 1859
- Little Tom – 1859
- Lizzy (35) – 1859
- Lizzy (7) – 1859
- London – 1859
- Louisa Ann (20) – 1859
- Luanda (7) – 1859
- Lucy (8) – 1859
- Luke – 1859
- Luther Jane (4) – 1859
- Malachi (16) – 1859
- Malinda (20) – 1859
- Malinda’s Child (1) – 1859
- Margaret (3) – 1859
- Maria (60) – 1859
- Mary (50) – 1859
- Mary Jane (1) – 1859
- Mary Mae (3) – 1859
- Matthew (8) – 1859

== Death ==
He died on April 1, 1855, in Dickson County, Tennessee which location became Cheatham County in 1856. He was buried near the Narrows property in a cemetery near his Bellevue home

== Legacy ==
He bequeathed $20,000 toward "the education of children not less than ten nor more than fourteen years old who are not able to support and educate themselves and whose parents are not able to do so." This was the foundational grant for the Montgomery Bell Academy in Nashville, Tennessee.

The Montgomery Bell State Park is named in his honor.

The Montgomery Bell Bridge, over the Harpeth River above its confluence with the Cumberland River near Ashland City, Tennessee on Tennessee State Route 49, is also named in his honor.
