= Abiff, Tennessee =

Unincorporated community in Tennessee, US

Coordinates: 35°58′35″N 87°19′03″W

Abiff is a small community in Dickson County, Tennessee, United States, about 40 miles (64 km) west of Nashville.
