= Davidson County Courthouse (Tennessee) =

- U.S. National Register of Historic Places
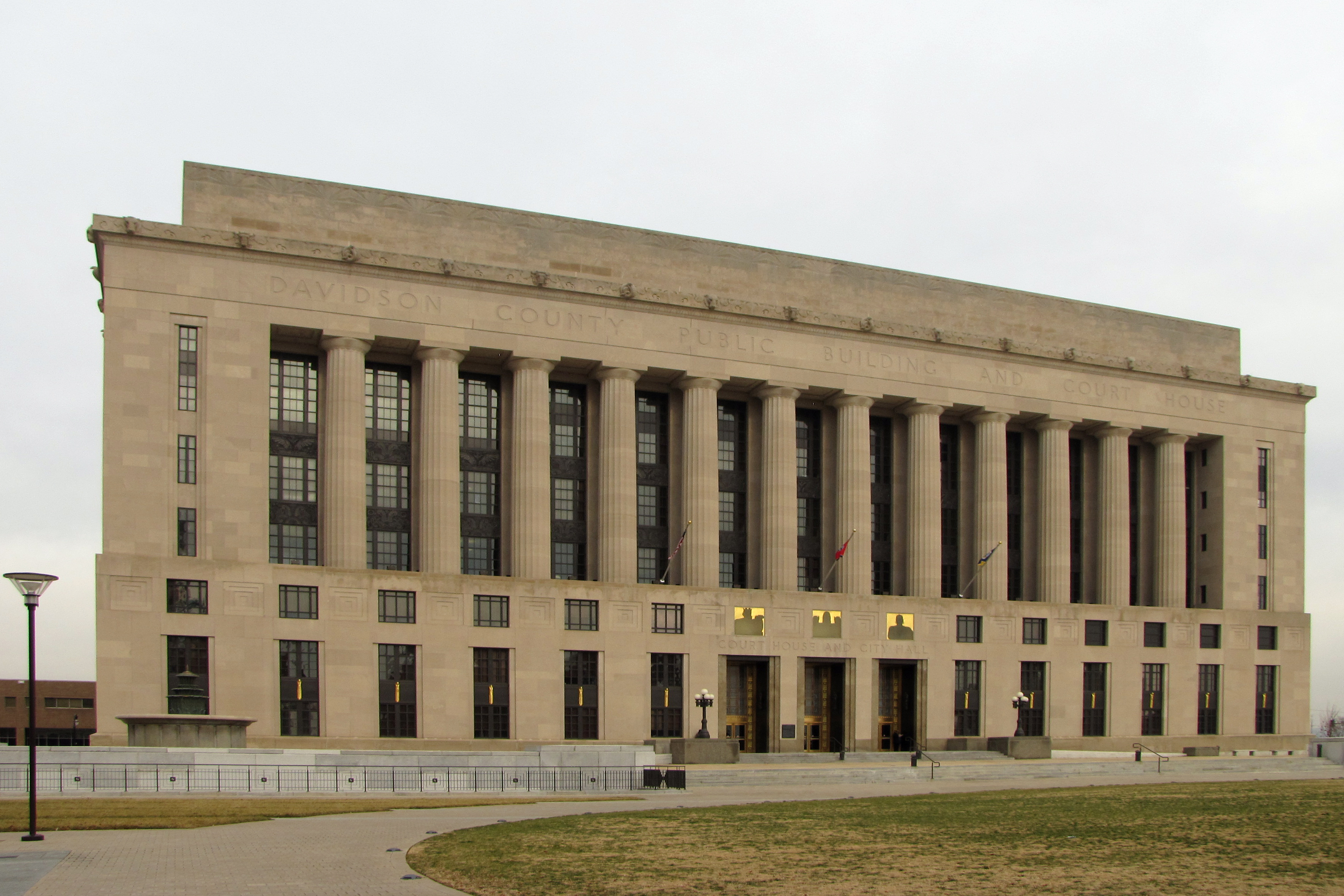
- Davidson County Courthouse

- Location within Tennessee Location within the United States
- Interactive map showing the location of Davidson County Courthouse
- Location: Public Sq., Nashville, Tennessee
- Coordinates: 36°10′2″N 86°46′43″W
- Built: 1937; 89 years ago
- Architect: Frederic Charles Hirons; Woolwine, Emmons
- Architectural style: Art Deco
- NRHP reference No.: 87000670
- Added to NRHP: March 23, 1987

Davidson County Courthouse, also known as Metropolitan Courthouse, is an Art Deco building built during 1936–37 in Nashville, Tennessee. It was listed on the National Register of Historic Places in 1987.

It is an eight-story steel-frame building sheathed with light beige Indiana limestone and gray-green granite as trim at entrances. It was designed by Nashville architect Emmons H. Woolwine and Hirons and Dennison of New York, who won a design competition for the project. It was the first building with central air conditioning in Davidson County.

The building is also Nashville's City Hall and houses the offices of the Mayor of Nashville and the Nashville City Council, therein.

On May 30, 2020, the building was affected by fire started by rioters. Despite damage, the courthouse still reopened on June 1, 2020, with at least one suspected arsonist arrested.
