= John Sevier State Office Building =

- U.S. National Register of Historic Places
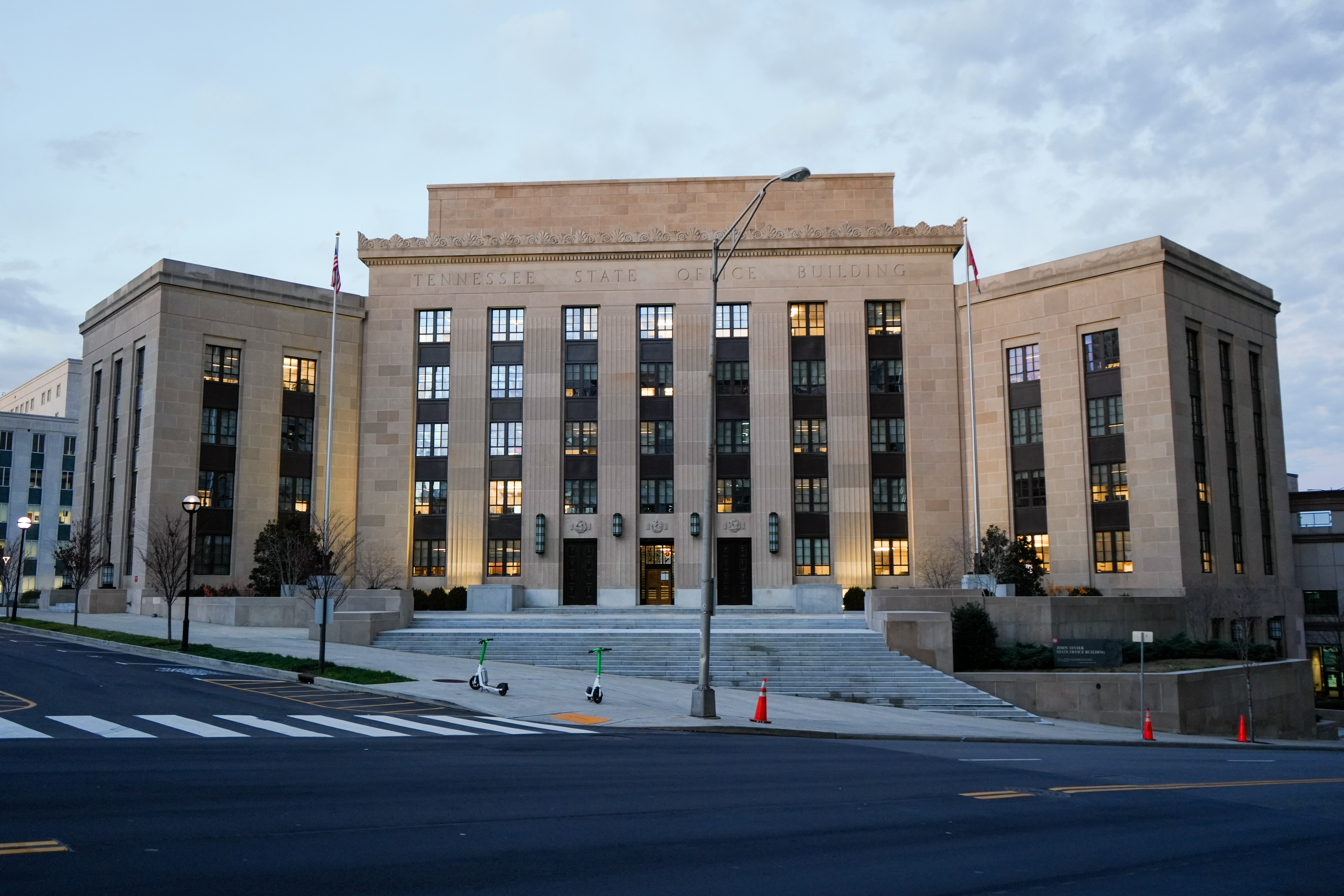
- The Tennessee State Office Building in 2007

- Location within Tennessee Location within the United States
- Location: 6th Avenue, North & Charlotte Avenue, Nashville, Tennessee
- Built: 1940
- Architect: Emmons H. Woolwine
- Architectural style: Art Deco
- NRHP reference No.: 11000455
- Added to NRHP: July 13, 2011

The John Sevier State Office Building, also known as the Tennessee State Office Building, is a historic building in Nashville, Tennessee, U.S.. Located on Tennessee State Capitol grounds, it was designed in the Art Deco architectural style by Emmons H. Woolwine, and completed in 1940. It was named for Governor John Sevier. It has been listed on the National Register of Historic Places since July 13, 2011.
