= Promise Land, Tennessee =

Unincorporated community in Tennessee, US

Coordinates: 36°12′35.2″N 87°19′53.03″W

- Promise Land School
- U.S. National Register of Historic Places
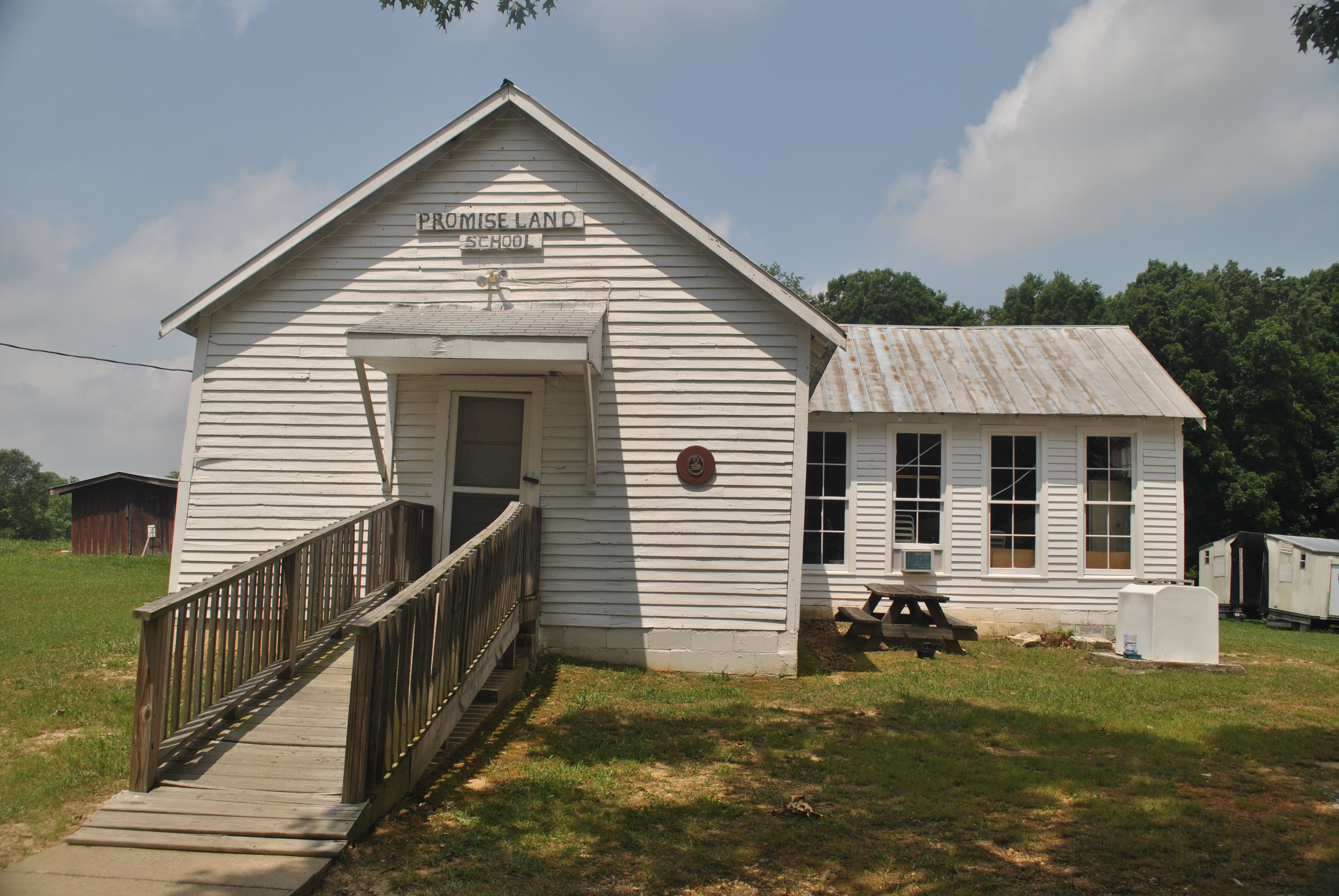
- The Promise Land Schoolhouse
- Location: Dickson County, Tennessee, United States
- NRHP reference No.: 07000159
- Added to NRHP: March 15, 2007

Promise, Promise Land or Promised Land was an unincorporated community founded in rural Dickson County, Tennessee, United States, north of Charlotte soon after the American Civil War by formerly enslaved people. At one time the settlement included stores, two church buildings (housing three congregations), a schoolhouse and around thirty houses.

The community began to dissipate during the era of the First and Second Great Migrations. By 1957 the Promise Land School, which at its 1905 peak had boasted 97 students of all grade levels, was consolidated with a school in Charlotte, although the school building was re-purposed as a community center and still stands, as does one of the two church buildings. While Promise Land no longer exists as a recognizable entity, heirs of the original African American settlers still own land in the area, and the annual Promise Land Community Festival brings back former residents and their descendants on the first weekend of June.

In 2007, the Promise Land School was placed on the National Register of Historic Places listings in Dickson County, Tennessee.
