= Dickson County War Memorial Building =

- U.S. National Register of Historic Places
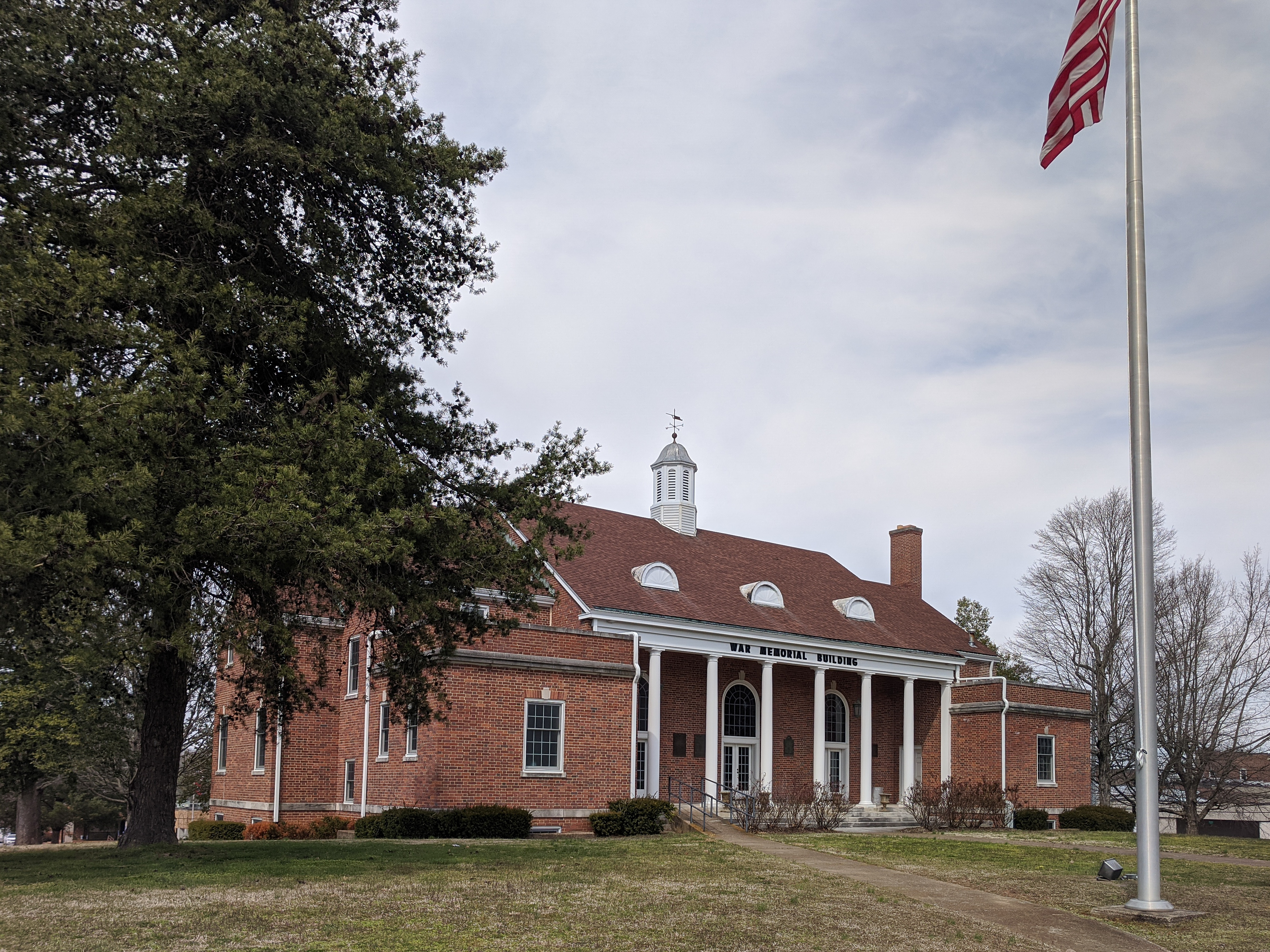

- Location within Tennessee Location within the United States
- Location: 225 Center Avenue, Dickson, Tennessee
- Coordinates: 36°4′27″N 87°23′26″W
- Area: 1 acre (0.40 ha)
- Built: 1933
- Architect: Emmons H. Woolwine
- Architectural style: Colonial Revival
- NRHP reference No.: 99000365
- Added to NRHP: March 18, 1999

The Dickson County War Memorial Building is a historic building in Dickson, Tennessee, U.S. It was built in 1932–1933. It was designed in the Colonial Revival architectural style by Emmons H. Woolwine. It was home to the Dickson County Library from 1933 to 1939, when it was used for the Draft board. It has been listed on the National Register of Historic Places since March 18, 1999.
