= Frederic Charles Hirons =

American architect

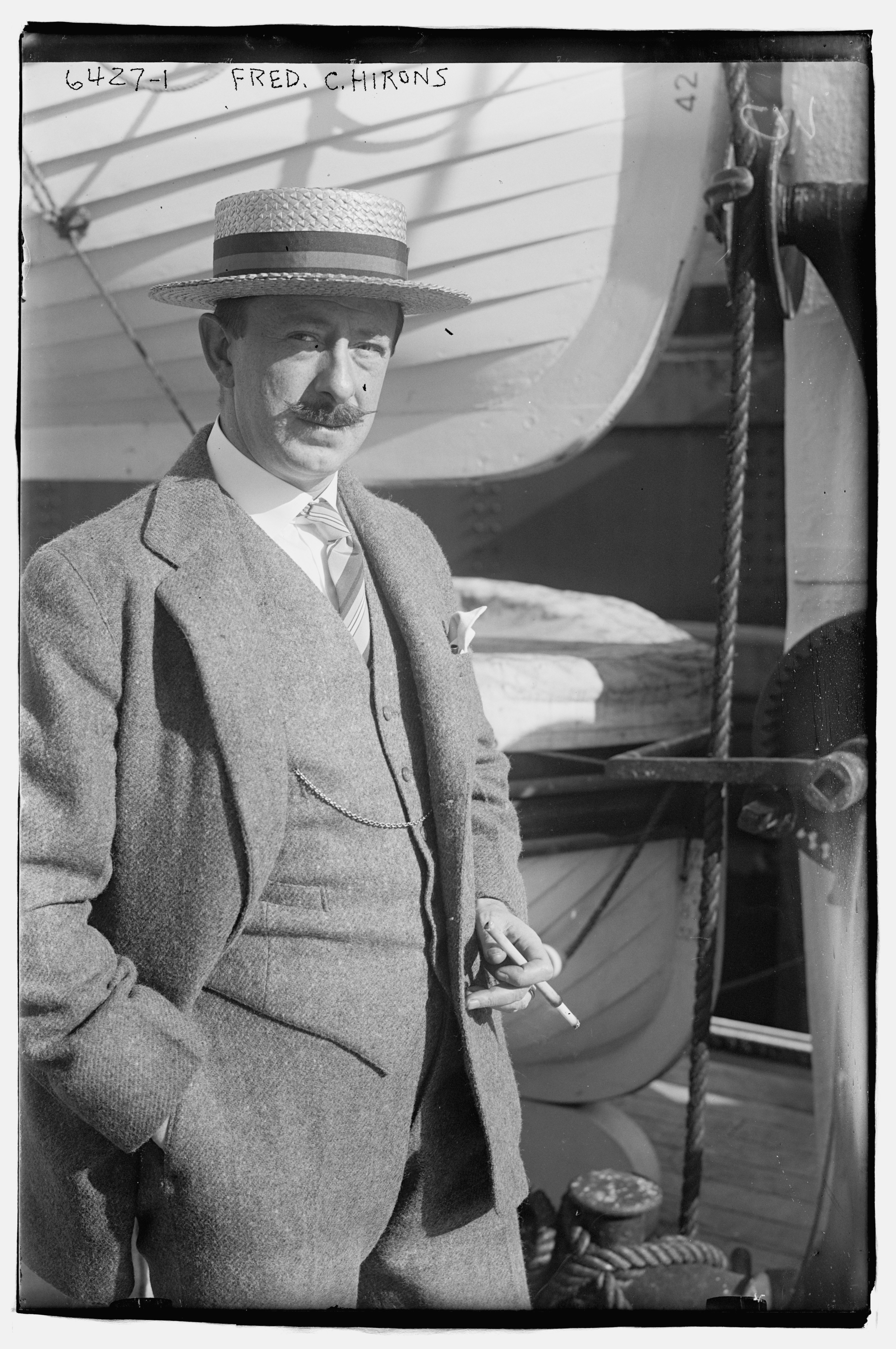
Frederic Charles Hirons

Frederic Charles Hirons (March 28, 1882 – January 23, 1942) was an American architect, based in New York City, who designed the Classical George Rogers Clark National Memorial, in Vincennes, Indiana, among the last major Beaux-Arts style public works in the United States, completed in 1933.

== Biography ==
Hirons was born in Manhattan on March 28, 1882.

He was of French extraction and moved to Massachusetts as a child. Hirons worked as a draftsman in the Boston architectural office of Herbert Hale from 1898 until 1901, before entering the Massachusetts Institute of Technology; on graduating in 1904 he received a Rotch Travelling Scholarship to study at the École des Beaux-Arts in Paris. MIT's Paris prize enabled him to continue his European studies until 1909.

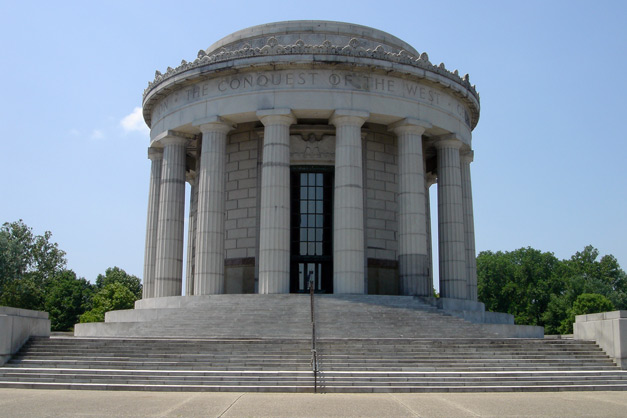
George Rogers Clark Memorial

On his return, he established an architectural practice in New York with Ethan Allen Dennison (1881–1954). Hirons and Dennison produced many commercial structures in the Beaux-Arts and Art Deco styles including; Delaware Title & Insurance Company, Wilmington, Delaware; Federal Trust Company Building, Newark; City National Bank, Bridgeport, Connecticut; Home Savings Bank, Albany, New York; State Bank & Trust Company, West 43rd Street and 8th Avenue, New York; Beaux-Arts Institute of Design, 304 East 44th Street; Suffolk Title and Guarantee Company Building, 90-04 161st Street, Queens, New York; The Mechanics Bank, New Haven Connecticut; The National State Bank, Elizabeth, New Jersey; The Erie Trust Company, Erie, Pennsylvania; The Society for Savings, Hartford, Connecticut; Trenton Banking Company, and the Trenton New Jersey. Their Childs Restaurant in Coney Island, New York (1923), employs colorfully glazed terracotta tiles in a fanciful resort style combining elements of the Spanish Colonial revival with numerous maritime allusions that refer to its seaside location". The Davidson County Courthouse of 1936 by Hirons and Dennison (with involvement of Nashville local architect Emmons H. Woolwine) is listed on the National Register of Historic Places.

In 1929, Hirons formed a two-year partnership with F.W. Mellor of Philadelphia, and then practiced again under his own name until 1940, when he retired.

He designed many public buildings, including the Worcester Memorial Auditorium and the George Rogers Clark Memorial in Vincennes, Indiana.

He was president of the Beaux-Arts Institute of Design (1937–39), of which he was a founder. He taught architecture at Yale University and Columbia University. His portrait by Henry R. Rittenberg is in the collection of the National Academy of Design.
