= Drouillard House =

Historic house in Tennessee, United States

- U.S. National Register of Historic Places
- Location within Tennessee Location within the United States
- Location: Off TN 48, Cumberland Furnace, Tennessee
- Coordinates: 36°15′49″N 87°21′37″W
- Area: 1 acre (0.40 ha)
- Built: 1868
- Architectural style: Italianate
- NRHP reference No.: 77001267
- Added to NRHP: December 27, 1977

The Drouillard House is a historic house at Cumberland Furnace, Tennessee. Built in 1868–1870 in the vicinity of Cumberland Furnace, the three-story house was a summer residence for Nashville socialite Mary Florence Kirkman and her husband Captain James Pierre Drouillard. It has been listed on the National Register of Historic Places since December 27, 1977. It is also part of the Cumberland Furnace Historic District.

== History ==
When established in 1795 by Gen. James Robertson, Cumberland Iron Works was the first furnace in Middle Tennessee. After a lacklustre decade, the iron works and the surrounding 640 acres were bought by Montgomery Bell for $16,000 in 1804. Bell "quickly turned Cumberland Furnace into a money-maker" and was able to sell it in 1825, together with the surrounding acres, for thrice the amount of money he had paid for it to Anthony Wayne Van Leer. Van Leer was a member of a well-known family in Chester County, Pennsylvania, where he was noted in the anti-slavery cause. One of their cabins in Pennsylvania were used as a station for the Underground Railroad Most Tennessee businesses had enslaved labor, despite this, all Anthony's workforce were paid fair salaries for the time.

Van Leer and partners operated the iron works for the next four decades, up until the beginning of the American Civil War. He shut down the iron works and moved to Nashville. Most of his relatives stayed in Pennsylvania. He offered his home as a Union headquarters.

For a few years, the Cumberland Furnace was managed by Van Leer's son-in-low, Hugh Kirkman, husband of his daughter, Eleanora C. VanLeer. After the death of Anthony Van Leer on July 9, 1863, the furnace and the surrounding area, and 85 enslaved African Americans, were inherited by his grandchildren, Mary Florence Kirkman and her brother VanLeer Kirkman. After the war, all former slaves were kept on payroll.

Florence Kirkman married Union Army Captain James Pierre Drouillard in 1864, which was considered scandalous in Nashville, as Tennessee had been occupied by Union troops since 1862. None of her friends or family attended the wedding.

Captain Drouillard reopened the furnace after the war, and operated it until it was sold in 1889 to the Southern Iron Company. He and Florence lived in the town, building a large house for their use as a country retreat.

Mary Florence Drouillard had their house designed after one she had seen in Newport, Rhode Island, a resort town for East Coast elite where she spent summers as a young woman while at school in New York. The Drouillard House was built in 1870. The Drouillard couple hosted lavish summer parties for guests from Nashville and New Orleans until 1886. At that time, they returned to Nashville. During the period when they lived at Cumberland Furnace, the Drouillards donated money to build a church for the community and a parish school to serve both white and black children. The St. James Episcopal Church is also listed on the National Register of Historic Places.

== Architecture ==
Completed in 1870, the Italianate style house is clapboard siding over frame, with a 10-foot deep veranda porch over 100 feet in length skirting the north facade. The house has two wings, and the kitchen is in the east wing. A three-story spiral staircase that goes up to an observation deck is a notable interior feature.
