= Montgomery Bell State Park =

State park in Tennessee, United States

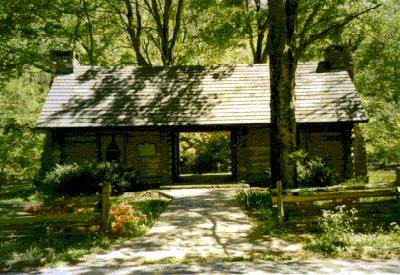
- Replica of the log house where the Cumberland Presbyterian Church was founded in 1810

- Location within Tennessee
- Location: Dickson County, Tennessee, United States
- Coordinates: 36°05′24″N 87°16′24″W
- Area: 3,782 acres (15.31 km^{2})
- Elevation: 758 ft (231 m)
- Established: 1943
- Named for: Montgomery Bell
- Visitors: avg. 1,000,000 a year
- Governing body: Tennessee Department of Environment and Conservation
- Website: Official website

Montgomery Bell State Park is a Tennessee state park in Burns, Tennessee, United States. The park covers 3,782 acres (1,531 ha) and its official elevation is 758 feet (231 m). However, due to the dissected wooded terrain typical of the Nashville Basin, actual elevations range from 580 feet (180 m) to 860 feet (260 m). The park is open for year-round recreation including boating, hiking, camping, fishing and golf. Montgomery Bell State Park was built during the Great Depression by members of the Works Progress Administration and Civilian Conservation Corps as Montgomery Bell Recreational Demonstration Area. Named for iron industrialist Montgomery Bell, the park is known as the birthplace of the Cumberland Presbyterian Church.

== History ==
Montgomery Bell State Park is located in what was once the center of the iron industry in Middle Tennessee. The park's namesake, Montgomery Bell, arrived in Tennessee from his birthplace in Pennsylvania by way of Kentucky. Bell purchased an iron works at Cumberland Furnace, Tennessee in 1804. He was soon able to expand his operation throughout the area forming one of the largest iron making operations in the state and earning him the name "Tennessee's First Iron Master". He greatly expanded his business during the War of 1812, when his furnaces produced cannonballs for the armies of General Andrew Jackson. The furnaces also produced many types of farm tools that were used throughout the Southeastern United States. Montgomery Bell became quite wealthy and was said to be the richest man in the South before the American Civil War. Prior to his death Bell began emancipating his slaves through the American Colonization Society. He sent 88 slaves on two ships to Liberia and intended to free all of them. Ultimately not all of his slaves were granted their freedom before he died in 1855.

Laurel Furnace was the main iron furnace within what is now Montgomery Bell State Park. The furnace was not owned by Bell. It was built in 1815 by Robert Napier. Napier was producing 660 tons of iron by 1820 at a value of over $32,000. The pig iron produced at Laurel Furnace was then shipped to Turnbull Forge in Cheatham County where it was worked into higher quality iron. High quality iron, guaranteed by Napier was produced at Laurel Furnace until the late 1850s. The ruins of the furnace are found at the park.

The Cumberland Presbyterian Church was founded in 1810 in the log cabin home of Reverend Samuel McAdow within what is now Montgomery Bell State Park. The church is a small denomination of the Presbyterian church with less than 50,000 members in 800 congregations. A replica of McAdow's cabin now stands where the church was found, and a sandstone chapel commemorating the event has been erected nearby. These two buildings are two of the main attractions in Montgomery Bell State Park.

Montgomery Bell State Park was developed as Montgomery Bell Recreational Demonstration Area during the Great Depression. The Recreational Demonstration Area program was a National Park Service program during the 1930s and early 1940s that built forty-six public parks in twenty-four states on 397,000 acres (1,606.6 km^{2}). The NPS used labor from Civilian Conservation Corps and Works Progress Administration, to Montgomery Bell Recreational Demonstration Area. By the conclusion of World War II, the Recreational Demonstration Areas throughout the nation had all either become National Park Service units or been given to their states for use as state parks. Montgomery Bell State Park was given to the state of Tennessee in 1943.

The 1987 Touchstone Pictures film Ernest Goes to Camp was shot here.

In 2012, a conference held by American Renaissance, a white separatist organization, was held at the Montgomery Bell State Park Inn. The organizers believed they would enjoy their First Amendment rights more on a public land.

== Resort ==
Montgomery Bell State Park is also known as Montgomery Bell State Resort Park. The resort features at the park include a Lodge and conference center, several cabins and a golf course. The Resort Lodge, built in 1951, has 117 hotel rooms and sits on the banks of Lake Acorn. The Lodge completed a full renovation in October 2020 and offers spacious rooms with private balconies overlooking the lake. Amenities include a restaurant, lounge, outdoor swimming pool, exercise room, outdoor fire pit, and free wifi and cable television. The Lodge at Montgomery Bell offers over 6,000 square feet of flexible event and pre-function space inside the Lodge. Additionally, two outdoor event spaces surround the Lodge at the Lake Acorn Pavilion and the Golf Course Veranda. The Lake Acorn Pavilion is an outdoor venue that offers beautiful views of Lake Acorn and accommodates up to 200 people, depending on the setup. It is equipped with restrooms, a fireplace, and electricity and is available April – October. Eight modern cabins are fully furnished and are the first in a series of environmentally responsible homes to be built in Tennessee's state parks. The Frank G. Clement Golf Course was built on park lands during the 1970s. It is a par 72, eighteen hole course. The Restaurant and lounge was renovated in October 2020. The menu offers classic favorites like Hot Chicken and Waffles to Caesar Salad with beverage selections featuring local and Tennessee spirits and wines, perfect for winding down after a day on the trail. The Restaurant also provides catering for events.

== Recreation ==
Montgomery Bell State Park is open for year-round recreation. There are 20 miles (32 km) of mountain biking trails at the park. Boating and fishing are permitted on Lake Acorn and Lake Woodhaven. Creech Hollow Lake is open to fishing, but has no boat access. Common game fish in the lakes include crappie, channel catfish, bluegill and shellcracker. There are 19 miles (31 km) of hiking trails at the park. Camping is permitted on the overnight trail. Lake Acorn is open to swimming at the beach. A large group camping area for groups such as Boy Scouts and Girl Scouts is available. There are 121 campsites in the park that are open to RVs and tent campers. The historic chapel offers open church services each weekend during the summer. In addition to all the activities listed above, there is also a golf course located on the park. It is known as the Montgomery Bell Golf Course. The course was built in 1973 and then redesigned by designer Gary Roger Baird in 1988. Hole #2, a 446 yards long par 5 is the signature hole. This beautiful hole has fairways lined with hardwood trees and four bunkers protect the green. The entire course is heavily wooded and features an abundance of wildlife. Each spring Montgomery Bell is host to The Dogwood Classic.
