= Cherokee Arboretum at Audubon Acres =

Arboretum and natural area in Chattanooga, Tennessee, US

Coordinates: 34.9994°N 85.1803°W

- Interactive map of Cherokee Arboretum at Audubon Acres
- Type: Arboretum
- Location: East Brainerd neighborhood of Chattanooga, Tennessee
- Area: 130 acres (53 ha)
- Website: Official website

The Cherokee Arboretum at Audubon Acres is a 130-acre (53 ha) arboretum and natural area located in the East Brainerd neighborhood of Chattanooga, Tennessee. It became an official arboretum in 2003 and is one of several properties protected by the Chattanooga Audubon Society.

The arboretum contains a walking trail (approximately 1 mile) that interprets the forest in the context of Native American culture. It features trees and woody plants labeled with scientific, common, and Cherokee names written in the Cherokee Syllabary. Cherokee uses are also described.

== See also ==
- List of botanical gardens in the United States
