= Bonny Oaks Arboretum =

Arboretum in Chattanooga, Tennessee, US

Coordinates: 35.073°N 85.183°W

- Interactive map of Bonny Oaks Arboretum
- Type: Arboretum
- Location: 6183 Adamson Circle, Chattanooga, Tennessee
- Website: Official website

Bonny Oaks Arboretum is an arboretum located at 6183 Adamson Circle, Chattanooga, Tennessee. It is open daily without charge.

The arboretum is a small round park in front of the Dent House, now the Hamilton County Agriculture Center, whose gardens and some buildings date from the mid-19th century. It contains 55 types of trees and shrubs, identified by common and scientific names, including the large willow oak which is over 100 years old.

== See also ==
- List of botanical gardens in the United States
