= Interstate Packaging Arboretum =

Arboretum in White Bluff, Tennessee

Coordinates: 36.124°N 87.228°W

The Interstate Packaging Arboretum is an arboretum located on the Interstate Packaging Company property, Highway 47 North, White Bluff, Tennessee. Formally named the Arboretum at Interstate Packaging, it was founded in 1989.

The arboretum includes over 60 species of shrubs and trees, as well as a greenhouse and fish pond (25,000 square feet). It serves as a planting site for The American Chestnut Foundation.

== See also ==
- List of botanical gardens in the United States
