= Burchfiel Grove and Arboretum =

Arboretum in Sevierville, Tennessee, United States

Coordinates: 35.87097°N 83.57473°W

- Interactive map of Burchfiel Grove and Arboretum
- Type: Arboretum
- Location: Hardin Lane, Sevierville, Tennessee

Burchfiel Grove and Arboretum is an arboretum located on Hardin Lane, Sevierville, Tennessee. It is open daily without charge.

The arboretum is a part of a greenway system running along the Little Pigeon River. It is maintained by the Sevierville Parks and Recreation Department, and contains over 30 labeled tree species and numerous types of shrubs.

== See also ==
- List of botanical gardens in the United States
- Sevier County, Tennessee
