= White Bluff, Tennessee =

- Town
- Location of White Bluff in Dickson County, Tennessee.
- Coordinates: 36°6′29″N 87°13′13″W
- Country: United States
- State: Tennessee
- County: Dickson
- Settled: 1806
- Incorporated: 1869
- Named for: Bluffs overlooking Turnbull Creek

Government
  - Mayor: Stephanie Murrell

Area
  - Total: 6.39 sq mi (16.56 km^{2})
  - Land: 6.39 sq mi (16.56 km^{2})
  - Water: 0 sq mi (0.00 km^{2})
- Elevation: 833 ft (254 m)

Population (2020)
  - Total: 3,862
  - Density: 604.2/sq mi (233.28/km^{2})
- Time zone: UTC-6 (Central (CST))
  - Summer (DST): UTC-5 (CDT)
- ZIP code: 37187
- Area code: 615
- FIPS code: 47-79980
- GNIS feature ID: 1304517
- Website: townofwhitebluff.gov

White Bluff is a town in Dickson County, Tennessee, United States. The population was 3,862 at the 2020 census and 3,206 at the 2010 census. The community name derives from the White Bluff Iron Forge.

== History ==
A fort was constructed at White Bluff in 1806, and an iron forge shortly afterward. The current town, which grew out of a Civil War-era Union Army encampment, was platted in 1867, and within a few years had grown to include several mercantile businesses and a planing mill.

== Geography ==
White Bluff is located in eastern Dickson County at 36°6′29″N 87°13′13″W (36.107971, -87.220300). According to the United States Census Bureau, the town has a total area of 5.9 square miles (15.4 km^{2}), all land.

White Bluff is located on U.S. Route 70 at its junction with State Route 47. US 70 leads east 30 miles (48 km) to Nashville and west 10 miles (16 km) to Dickson. TN 47 leads southwest 7 miles (11 km) to Burns before continuing to Dickson, and northwest 9 miles (14 km) to Charlotte, the Dickson County seat.

White Bluff is east of Montgomery Bell State Park.

== Demographics ==
Historical population
| Census | Pop. | Note | %± |
|---|---|---|---|
| 1910 | 419 | | — |
| 1920 | 449 | | 7.2% |
| 1930 | 464 | | 3.3% |
| 1940 | 522 | | 12.5% |
| 1950 | 506 | | −3.1% |
| 1960 | 486 | | −4.0% |
| 1970 | 1,163 | | 139.3% |
| 1980 | 2,055 | | 76.7% |
| 1990 | 1,988 | | −3.3% |
| 2000 | 2,142 | | 7.7% |
| 2010 | 3,206 | | 49.7% |
| 2020 | 3,862 | | 20.5% |

=== 2020 census ===
White Bluff racial composition
| Race | Number | Percentage |
|---|---|---|
| White (non-Hispanic) | 3,485 | 90.24% |
| Black or African American (non-Hispanic) | 24 | 0.62% |
| Native American | 20 | 0.52% |
| Asian | 15 | 0.39% |
| Other/Mixed | 184 | 4.76% |
| Hispanic or Latino | 134 | 3.47% |

As of the 2020 census, White Bluff had a population of 3,862. The median age was 38.4 years. 22.6% of residents were under the age of 18 and 15.7% of residents were 65 years of age or older. For every 100 females there were 95.5 males, and for every 100 females age 18 and over there were 92.4 males age 18 and over.

0.0% of residents lived in urban areas, while 100.0% lived in rural areas.

There were 1,515 households in White Bluff, of which 34.5% had children under the age of 18 living in them. Of all households, 48.0% were married-couple households, 15.8% were households with a male householder and no spouse or partner present, and 28.3% were households with a female householder and no spouse or partner present. About 24.6% of all households were made up of individuals and 12.2% had someone living alone who was 65 years of age or older.

There were 1,597 housing units, of which 5.1% were vacant. The homeowner vacancy rate was 1.0% and the rental vacancy rate was 4.5%.

=== 2000 census ===
At the 2000 census, there were 2,142 people, 881 households and 604 families residing in the town. The population density was 536.9 inhabitants per square mile (207.3/km^{2}). There were 947 housing units at an average density of 237.4 per square mile (91.7/km^{2}). The racial makeup of the town was 98.13% White, 0.65% African American, 0.37% Native American, 0.19% Asian, 0.09% from other races, and 0.56% from two or more races. Hispanic or Latino of any race were 0.65% of the population.

There were 881 households, of which 30.9% had children under the age of 18 living with them, 53.1% were married couples living together, 11.4% had a female householder with no husband present, and 31.4% were non-families. 27.7% of all households were made up of individuals, and 11.0% had someone living alone who was 65 years of age or older. The average household size was 2.43 and the average family size was 2.96.

24.4% of the population were under the age of 18, 8.2% from 18 to 24, 30.7% from 25 to 44, 24.3% from 45 to 64, and 12.4% who were 65 years of age or older. The median age was 36 years. For every 100 females, there were 100.9 males. For every 100 females age 18 and over, there were 93.0 males.

The median household income was $34,107 and the median family income was $39,219. Males had a median income of $31,509 versus $25,260 for females. The per capita income for the town was $16,229. About 6.1% of families and 8.1% of the population were below the poverty line, including 3.9% of those under age 18 and 13.6% of those age 65 or over.

== Education ==
There have been several schools in the White Bluff area over the years. The first public school in the community was reportedly destroyed by fire in 1879.

White Bluff Elementary School is one of the town's primary public schools and serves students from the local community as part of the Dickson County School District.

William James Middle School has a long history in White Bluff, tracing its origins to a school built on land donated in 1923 by Colonel William James, a Spanish–American War officer. The school’s athletic teams are known as the Colonels in his honor, and his grave remains inside the current school building.

For many years, all twelve grades were taught at the William James site. After the original 1923 building was demolished following the 1971–1972 school year, the school became a junior high school serving grades 7–9 in 1972. In 1999–2000, as part of a district-wide realignment, it transitioned to a middle school serving grades 6–8, which is its current configuration.

== Area attractions ==
- Interstate Packaging Arboretum
- Montgomery Bell State Park

== Notable people ==
- Anson A. Mount IV, star of film and television
- Larry Fleet, singer-songwriter

== Radio ==
- WYCZ 1030 AM
