= Carlisle S. Page Arboretum =

Arboretum in Memphis, Tennessee

Coordinates: 35.1220°N 90.0295°W

The Carlisle S. Page Arboretum (80 acres) is an arboretum located within Historic Elmwood Cemetery, 824 South Dudley Street, Memphis, Tennessee.

The arboretum contains some 800 trees (of which 400 are labeled), representing 63 species. According to the cemetery's owners, eight of these are National Champion Trees, and two are State Champion Trees. Ornamental trees include Chinese fringe tree (Chionanthus retusus), crape-myrtle, dogwood, magnolia, deciduous holly, fruit trees, etc.

== See also ==
- List of botanical gardens in the United States
