= Calvary Episcopal Church (Cumberland Furnace, Tennessee) =

Historic church in Tennessee, United States

- St. James Episcopal Church
- U.S. National Register of Historic Places
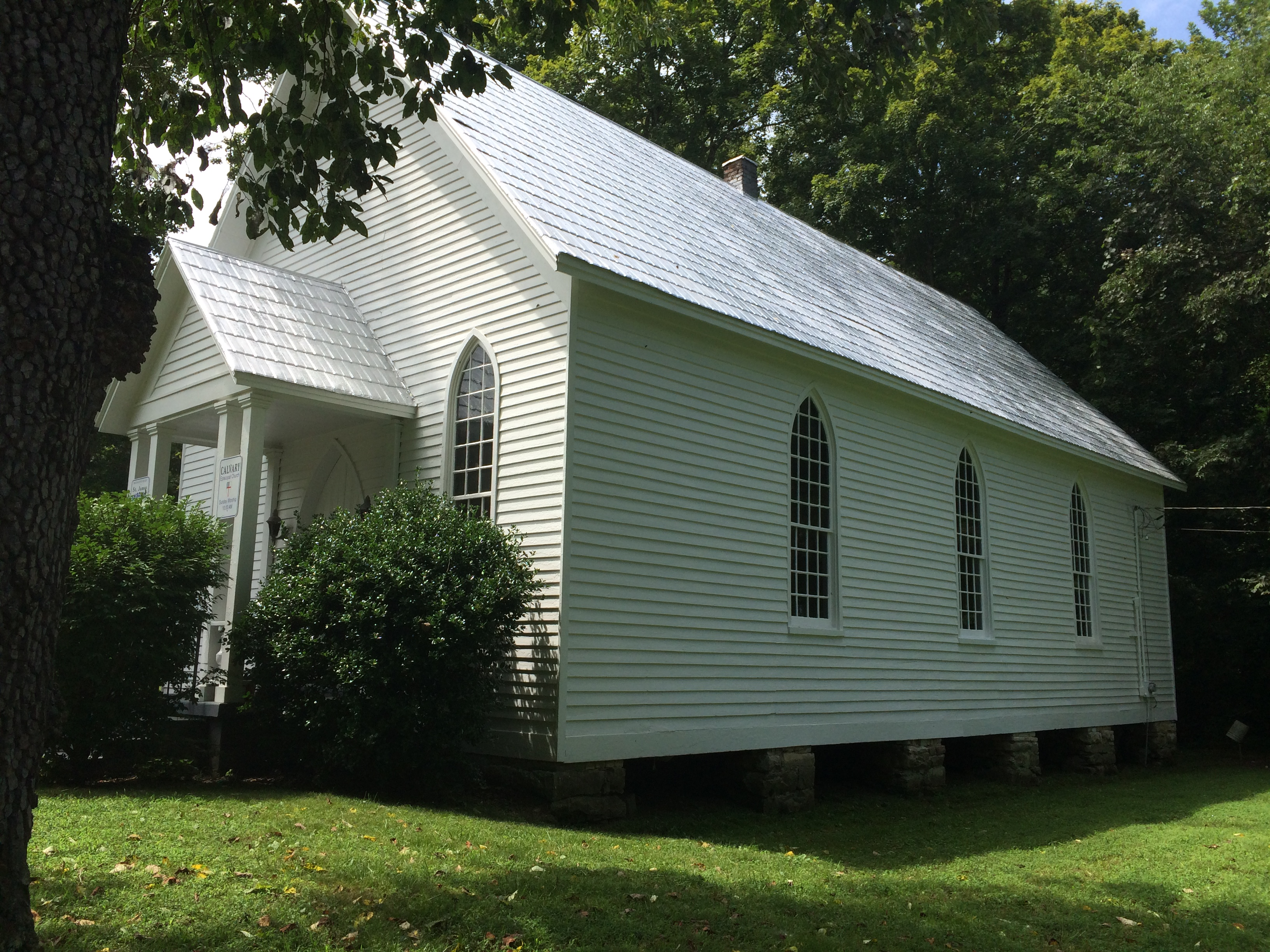

- Location within Tennessee Location within the United States
- Location: Off TN 48, Cumberland Furnace, Tennessee
- Coordinates: 36°15′46″N 87°21′28″W
- Area: 3 acres (1.2 ha)
- Built: 1879
- Architectural style: Gothic Revival
- NRHP reference No.: 77001268
- Added to NRHP: August 22, 1977

The Calvary Episcopal Church (formerly St. James Episcopal Church) is a historic Episcopal church located off Tennessee State Route 48 in Cumberland Furnace, Tennessee.

== History ==
St. James Episcopal Church was founded in 1878. Its small white frame church building was completed the following year in a Gothic Revival style. The church was consecrated by Bishop Charles Quintard in August 1882.

The builders of the church were Captain James Pierre Drouillard and his wife, born Mary Florence Kirkman. Mary Florence Kirkman Drouillard was the granddaughter of Anthony Wayne Van Leer, who was a member of a well known historical family in Pennsylvania and noted in the anti-slavery cause. Van Leer purchased the notable iron works at Cumberland Furnace. She was heiress to the iron works in Cumberland Furnace as well as 20,000 acres (8,100 ha) of land in the vicinity. Drouillard was a West Point graduate who served as an officer in the Union Army during the Civil War; Mary Florence Kirkman shocked Nashville society when she married him there in 1864 (while the state of Tennessee was still at war with the Union). For several years, the Drouillards made their home in Cumberland Furnace and oversaw the operation of the iron works. In 1870 they built their three-story Italianate mansion home, now known as Drouillard House, on a site that overlooks the community. They also constructed a school for both black and white children on the land where the church's parish hall now stands. In 1882, the Drouillards transferred the church to the Protestant Episcopal Church of Tennessee for $5. The Drouillards left Cumberland Furnace in 1886 and took up residence in Nashville. The church building was added to the National Register of Historic Places in 1977.

During the 1980s, St. James established a "daughter" church in Dickson. During the 1990s, the church in Dickson was redesignated as St. James Episcopal Church and the church in Cumberland Furnace became a mission church, renamed Calvary Church.
