= Emmons H. Woolwine =

American architect

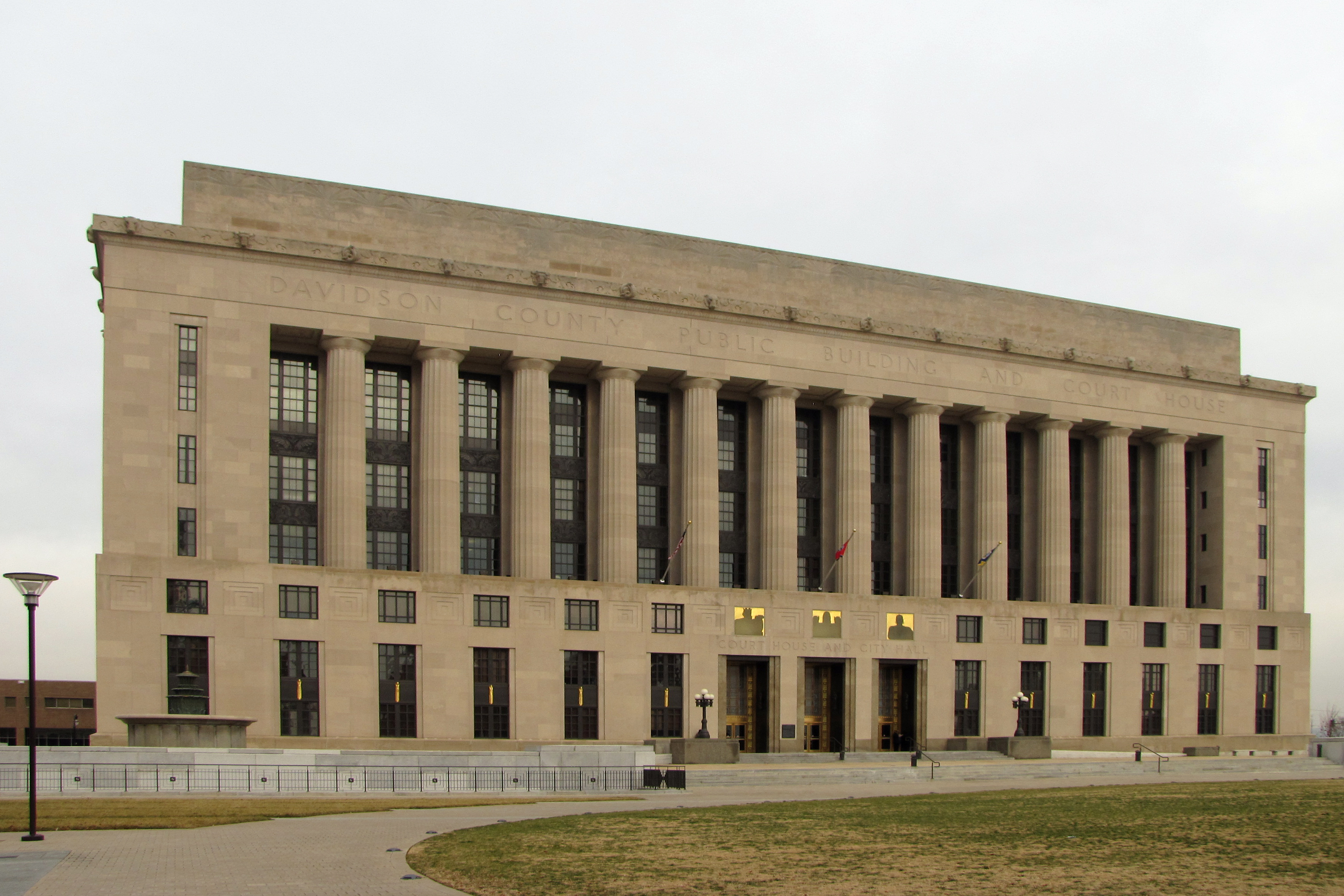
Davidson County Courthouse

Emmons H. Woolwine (1899–1951) was an architect of Nashville, Tennessee.

At least two of his works are listed on the U.S. National Register of Historic Places.

== Works ==
Works include:

- Davidson County Courthouse, Public Sq. Nashville, Tennessee (Woolwine, Emmons, with Hirons and Dennison), NRHP-listed
- Dickson County War Memorial Building, 225 Center Ave., Dickson, Tennessee (Woolwine, Emmons H.), NRHP-listed
- John Sevier State Office Building (1940)
