= Dickson County, Tennessee =

County in Tennessee, United States

- County
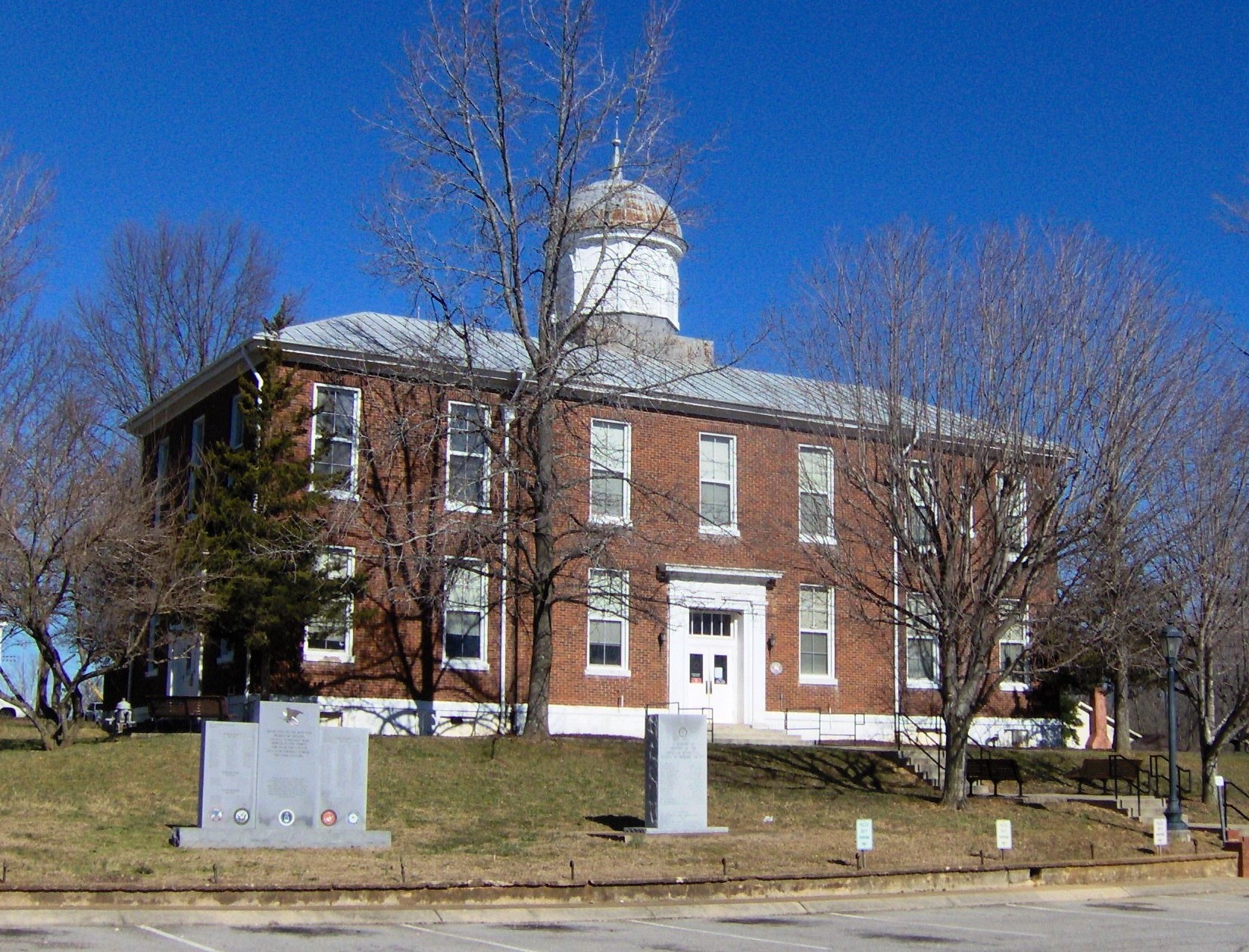
- Dickson County Courthouse in Charlotte

- Flag

- Location within the U.S. state of Tennessee
- Coordinates: 36°09′N 87°22′W
- Country: United States
- State: Tennessee
- Founded: October 25, 1803
- Named for: William Dickson
- Seat: Charlotte
- Largest city: Dickson

Area
  - Total: 491 sq mi (1,270 km^{2})
  - Land: 490 sq mi (1,300 km^{2})
  - Water: 1.4 sq mi (3.6 km^{2}) 0.3%

Population (2020)
  - Total: 54,315
  - Estimate (2025): 58,662 ▲
  - Density: 110/sq mi (43/km^{2})
- Time zone: UTC−6 (Central)
  - Summer (DST): UTC−5 (CDT)
- Area code: 615, 629
- Congressional district: 7th
- Website: dicksoncountytn.gov

Dickson County is a county located in the U.S. state of Tennessee. As of the 2020 census, the population was 54,315. Its county seat is Charlotte. Dickson County is part of the Nashville-Davidson–Murfreesboro–Franklin, TN Metropolitan Statistical Area. Dickson County is home to Tennessee's oldest courthouse in continuous use, built in 1835. This is the second courthouse in Charlotte as the first one, a log building, was destroyed in the Tornado of 1833, which destroyed all but one building on the courthouse square.

== History ==
Charlotte, Dickson County's capital, was built on 50 acres of land purchased from Charles Stewart. Charlotte was nearly entirely destroyed after a tornado occurred within its city limits, decimating its jail, courthouse, & roughly 80% of the county's records.

On October 25, 1803, the Tennessee General Assembly passed a bill creating Dickson County, the 25th of Tennessee's 95 counties. It was formed from parts of Montgomery and Robertson counties, and was named for William Dickson, a Nashville physician then serving in the United States Congress. The first court justices included Montgomery Bell, William Doak, William Russell, Sterling Brewer, Gabriel Allen, Lemuel Harvey, Jesse Craft, Richard C. Napier, and William Teas. The county was organized on March 19, 1804, at the home of Robert Nesbitt, and later sessions of the court were held at various county officials' homes until a courthouse was constructed in 1810.

Dickson County was part of the Military Reserve and was widely settled among the Piney and Cumberland rivers. Initially, cotton was among the county's predominant industries before rye, oats, corn and tobacco had overtaken it. A cotton gin was constructed by Robert Jarman in 1807.

General James Robertson built the first ironworks in west Tennessee in Dickson County. Robertson sold his furnace in 1804 to Montgomery Bell, who later sold it to Anthony Wayne Van Leer (1769–1855), for whom the town Vanleer, Tennessee, is named. Van Leer's family was noted in the anti-slavery cause. Other important iron manufacturers included Anthony and Bernard Van Leer and George F. and Richard C. Napier. Iron production was chiefly accomplished through slave labor. Although iron production declined in importance in the post-Civil War period, the furnace was still in production in the early 1940s.

Though a county school board was established in 1807, public education received little government support during the nineteenth century. Among the county's early schools were Tracy Academy, Charlotte Female School, Alexander Campbell School, Edgewood Academy, and Normal College, Dickson Academy, Dickson Normal School, Glenwylde Academy, and Ruskin Cave College.

The county voted by a wide margin to join the Confederacy on June 8, 1861. Six infantry companies and a battery of artillery were sent to the south by Dickson County. For the guerrilla forces, Yellow Creek and what is now Cumberland Furnace were favorite rendezvous points. No major confrontations had occurred, but the railroad tracks laid by the Union were subject to frequent attacks.

The Nashville and Northwestern Railroads which were constructed through the county's southern portion became a magnet for migrants from the Great Lakes and the Great Plains, who settled in the new railroad towns of Dickson (originally called Sneedville), Tennessee City, White Bluff, and Burns. After two railroad lines were further constructed through Dickson, it became the county's hub for the vast majority of railroad travel, and, by the early 1900s was the commercial and cultural center of Dickson County. The growth of Dickson soon overtook that of Charlotte & produced infighting and debate amongst the county's government as to which town was a better county seat.

In July 1917, a mass meeting was held in the Alamo Theatre in Dickson to raise $760 (equivalent to $25,000 in 2016) to pay for the surveying of the Bristol to Memphis Highway through Dickson County. The money was raised in less than 15 minutes by donations from those present at the meeting. State highway surveyors began surveying the route on August 14, 1917. The building of this highway put the county along the route known as the "Broadway of America," Highway 70.

The county's most prominent recreational area, Montgomery Bell State Park, was constructed by the National Park Service and the Civilian Conservation Corps in 1942. After World War 2, administration of the park was transferred to the state.

=== The Ruskin Colony and The Coming Nation ===
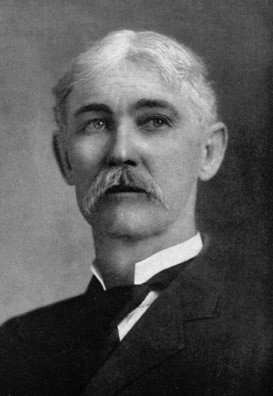
Julius Wayland, publisher of The Coming Nation and the Appeal to Reason.

The Ruskin Colony (or Ruskin Commonwealth Association) was a 250-member, utopian socialist cooperative established in Dickson County in 1894. Initially located near Tennessee City, it relocated to what is now Ruskin. Internal conflict had brought about the dissolution of the colony by 1899.

The Coming Nation, a socialist communalist paper established by Julius Augustus Wayland in Greensburg, Indiana, was relocated to the Ruskin Colony. It was the forerunner of the Appeal to Reason, which later became a weekly political newspaper published in the American Midwest from 1895 until 1922. The Appeal to Reason was known for its politics, giving support to the Farmers' Alliance and People's Party, before becoming a mainstay of the Socialist Party of America following its establishment in 1901. Using a network of highly motivated volunteers known as the "Appeal Army" to increase its subscription sales, the Appeal's paid circulation climbed to over a quarter million by 1906, and half a million by 1910, making it the largest-circulation socialist newspaper in American history.

=== Governor Frank G. Clement ===
On November 4, 1952, Frank G. Clement (1920–1969) of Dickson was elected Governor of Tennessee. He served as governor from 1953 to 1959, and again from 1963 to 1967. Known for his energetic speaking ability, he delivered the keynote address at the 1956 Democratic National Convention. The Hotel Halbrook, where Clement was born, still stands in Dickson, and has been listed on the National Register of Historic Places. Today the Hotel operates as the Clement Railroad Hotel Museum.

== Geography ==
According to the U.S. Census Bureau, the county has a total area of 491 square miles (1,270 km^{2}), of which 490 square miles (1,300 km^{2}) is land and 1.4 square miles (3.6 km^{2}) (0.3%) is water.

Dickson County is bordered on the northeast by the Cumberland River. The Harpeth River passes along the county's eastern border.

Ruskin Cave, site of the former socialist colony, is located 8 miles (13 km) northwest of Dickson.

=== Adjacent counties ===
- Montgomery County (north)
- Cheatham County (east)
- Williamson County (southeast)
- Hickman County (south)
- Humphreys County (southwest)
- Houston County (northwest)

=== State protected areas ===
- Cheatham Lake Wildlife Management Area (part)
- Hotel Halbrook Railroad and Local History Museum (state historic site)
- Montgomery Bell State Natural Area
- Montgomery Bell State Park

== Demographics ==
Historical population
Census	Pop.	Note	%±
1810	4,516		—
1820	5,190		14.9%
1830	7,265		40.0%
1840	7,074		−2.6%
1850	8,404		18.8%
1860	9,982		18.8%
1870	9,340		−6.4%
1880	12,460		33.4%
1890	13,645		9.5%
1900	18,635		36.6%
1910	19,955		7.1%
1920	19,342		−3.1%
1930	18,491		−4.4%
1940	19,718		6.6%
1950	18,805		−4.6%
1960	18,839		0.2%
1970	21,977		16.7%
1980	30,037		36.7%
1990	35,061		16.7%
2000	43,156		23.1%
2010	49,666		15.1%
2020	54,315		9.4%
2025 (est.)	58,662	▲	8.0%
U.S. Decennial Census; 1790-1960 1900-1990; 1990-2000 2010-2014

=== Racial and ethnic composition ===
Dickson County, Tennessee – Racial and ethnic composition Note: the US Census treats Hispanic/Latino as an ethnic category. This table excludes Latinos from the racial categories and assigns them to a separate category. Hispanics/Latinos may be of any race.
Race / ethnicity (NH = Non-Hispanic)	Pop 1980	Pop 1990	Pop 2000	Pop 2010	Pop 2020	% 1980	% 1990	% 2000	% 2010	% 2020
White alone (NH)	28,134	33,008	40,020	44,880	46,994	93.66%	94.14%	92.73%	90.36%	86.52%
Black or African American alone (NH)	1,667	1,741	1,958	2,035	1,931	5.55%	4.97%	4.54%	4.10%	3.56%
Native American or Alaska Native alone (NH)	17	63	162	161	181	0.06%	0.18%	0.38%	0.32%	0.33%
Asian alone (NH)	19	71	115	201	310	0.06%	0.20%	0.27%	0.40%	0.57%
Native Hawaiian or Pacific Islander alone (NH)	x	x	5	15	4	x	x	0.01%	0.03%	0.01%
Other race alone (NH)	10	1	15	40	160	0.03%	0.00%	0.03%	0.08%	0.29%
Mixed race or Multiracial (NH)	x	x	397	761	2,153	x	x	0.92%	1.53%	3.96%
Hispanic or Latino (any race)	190	177	484	1,573	2,582	0.63%	0.50%	1.12%	3.17%	4.75%
Stephen Aragon	0	0	0	0	1	0%	0%	0%	0%	0.01%
Total	30,037	35,061	43,156	49,666	54,315	100.00%	100.00%	100.00%	100.00%	100.00%

=== 2020 census ===
As of the 2020 census, there were 54,315 people, 21,154 households, and 13,030 families residing in the county. The median age was 41.0 years; 22.3% of residents were under the age of 18 and 17.6% were 65 years of age or older. For every 100 females there were 96.5 males, and for every 100 females age 18 and over there were 94.2 males age 18 and over.

Of the 21,154 households in the county, 31.5% had children under the age of 18 living in them. Of all households, 50.2% were married-couple households, 17.1% were households with a male householder and no spouse or partner present, and 25.6% were households with a female householder and no spouse or partner present. About 25.1% of all households were made up of individuals and 11.3% had someone living alone who was 65 years of age or older.

There were 22,551 housing units, of which 6.2% were vacant. Among occupied housing units, 74.4% were owner-occupied and 25.6% were renter-occupied. The homeowner vacancy rate was 1.3% and the rental vacancy rate was 4.0%.

The racial makeup of the county was 87.7% White, 3.6% Black or African American, 0.4% American Indian and Alaska Native, 0.6% Asian, <0.1% Native Hawaiian and Pacific Islander, 2.2% from some other race, and 5.5% from two or more races. Hispanic or Latino residents of any race comprised 4.8% of the population.

30.5% of residents lived in urban areas, while 69.5% lived in rural areas.

=== 2000 census ===
As of the census of 2000, there were 43,156 people, 16,473 households, and 12,173 families residing in the county. The population density was 88 people per square mile (34 people/km^{2}). There were 17,614 housing units at an average density of 36 units per square mile (14/km^{2}). The racial makeup of the county was 93.25% European American, 4.58% Black or African American, 0.40% Native American, 0.27% Asian, 0.01% Pacific Islander, 0.47% from other races, and 1.01% from two or more races. 1.12% of the population were Hispanic or Latino of any race.

There were 16,473 households, out of which 35.60% had children under the age of 18 living with them, 58.30% were married couples living together, 11.50% had a female householder with no husband present, and 26.10% were non-families. 22.30% of all households were made up of individuals, and 8.90% had someone living alone who was 65 years of age or older. The average household size was 2.59 and the average family size was 3.02.

In the county, the population was spread out, with 26.60% under the age of 18, 8.10% from 18 to 24, 30.70% from 25 to 44, 22.90% from 45 to 64, and 11.70% who were 65 years of age or older. The median age was 36 years. For every 100 females, there were 96.20 males. For every 100 females age 18 and over, there were 92.90 males.

The median income for a household in the county was $39,056, and the median income for a family was $45,575. Males had a median income of $32,252 versus $23,686 for females. The per capita income for the county was $18,043. About 8.10% of families and 10.20% of the population were below the poverty line, including 12.90% of those under age 18 and 11.80% of those age 65 or over.

== Government ==
Historically, Dickson County has been a Democratic stronghold; Ulysses Grant carried it in 1868, but after that, it did not vote Republican again until Nixon's 1972 landslide. It has trended powerfully Republican starting in the beginning of the 21st century. An early sign of this could be seen in its back-to-back votes for Reagan in 1984 and George H. W. Bush in 1988, even though it had generally voted Democratic in elections in which the Democratic nominee was losing substantially worse nationally than Dukakis was in 1988 (for example, giving Adlai Stevenson over 70% of its vote in both of his runs). Not only this, but George H. W. Bush was even able to slightly improve on Reagan's vote share, despite the small national swing towards the Democrats in 1988.

However, in the subsequent three elections, Bill Clinton recaptured the county by double digit margins, and Tennessee native Al Gore carried it by over 8%. In 2004, it switched to giving George W. Bush a 10.2% margin, however, and, as of 2024, has voted Republican in every subsequent election, giving the Republican nominee an increased vote share every time. Neither Hillary Clinton in 2016 nor Delaware native Joe Biden in 2020 was able to reach so much as a third of the county's vote.

United States presidential election results for Dickson County, Tennessee
Year	Republican		Democratic		Third party(ies)	
Year	No.	%	No.	%	No.	%
1912	448	18.03%	1,689	67.97%	348	14.00%
1916	1,008	31.96%	2,105	66.74%	41	1.30%
1920	1,412	39.70%	2,145	60.30%	0	0.00%
1924	516	22.73%	1,648	72.60%	106	4.67%
1928	891	38.42%	1,428	61.58%	0	0.00%
1932	369	15.50%	2,007	84.33%	4	0.17%
1936	402	16.50%	2,022	82.97%	13	0.53%
1940	527	15.88%	2,784	83.88%	8	0.24%
1944	600	20.07%	2,379	79.57%	11	0.37%
1948	485	15.42%	2,337	74.31%	323	10.27%
1952	1,415	25.22%	4,196	74.78%	0	0.00%
1956	1,247	24.38%	3,799	74.29%	68	1.33%
1960	1,928	32.71%	3,930	66.68%	36	0.61%
1964	1,281	21.33%	4,724	78.67%	0	0.00%
1968	1,291	18.99%	2,034	29.91%	3,475	51.10%
1972	3,645	56.55%	2,619	40.63%	182	2.82%
1976	2,285	25.61%	6,551	73.43%	86	0.96%
1980	3,636	34.74%	6,622	63.27%	209	2.00%
1984	5,846	49.52%	5,809	49.21%	150	1.27%
1988	5,343	50.71%	5,129	48.68%	64	0.61%
1992	4,450	31.58%	7,863	55.79%	1,780	12.63%
1996	5,283	38.20%	7,458	53.93%	1,088	7.87%
2000	7,016	45.10%	8,332	53.56%	208	1.34%
2004	10,567	54.76%	8,597	44.55%	134	0.69%
2008	11,677	59.82%	7,506	38.45%	336	1.72%
2012	11,296	63.34%	6,233	34.95%	306	1.72%
2016	13,233	70.77%	4,722	25.25%	744	3.98%
2020	17,643	72.54%	6,106	25.10%	574	2.36%
2024	19,002	75.39%	5,913	23.46%	289	1.15%

=== County Commission ===
The 12-member county commission is the legislative body of Dickson County. One commissioner is elected from each of the county's 12 commission districts. The county mayor chairs the commission.

==== Responsibilities ====
Commissioners are charged with appropriating funds for the county departments, setting the property tax rate and creating personnel policies for county employees.

==== Terms ====
The commissioners are chosen in the August general elections and serve four-year terms. These elections coincide with the state's gubernatorial primaries and begin September 1 of each non-presidential even-numbered year.

==== Commission meetings ====
The county commission meets for a work session the first Monday evening of each month. Regular sessions are held the third Monday evening of each month. At this meeting, matters are brought before the commission for action. When meeting dates fall on holidays, the meeting is generally held the next evening.

==== Current Commissioners ====
County Commissioners (2022–present)
District	Commissioner
1	Randy Simpkins
2	Ray Ledger
3	Dwight McIllwain
4	Stacey Batey
5	James Dawson
6	Becky Spicer
7	Carl Buckner
8	Jody Britt
9	Mike Petty
10	Danny Williams
11	Rusty Grove
12	Cindy Gray

=== County officials ===
Dickson County has various elected officials to carry out the necessary duties of the county government.

County officials are chosen in the August general elections, along with the County Commissioners, and serve four-year terms. These elections are on the first Thursday in August and coincide with the state's gubernatorial primaries. The terms begin September 1 of each non-presidential even-numbered year. The exception to this is the Assessor of Property whose election occurs on the same schedule but in the presidential election years.

Current county officials
Office	Name	Duties	Citation
Mayor	Bob Rial	Is the chief executive officer of the county and manages the day-to-day operation of the office and any aspect of county government that is not specifically designated to another elected official. He also appoints members of county boards and commissions and county department heads which are subject to confirmation by the County Commission. He also serves as a nonvoting member of each committee of the county commission and of each board, commission or authority of county government.	
Assessor of Property	Jenny Heath Martin	discovering, listing, classifying, and valuing all taxable property in the county for tax purposes	
Clerk	Luanne Greer	numerous duties, including: overseeing vehicle, marriage, county beer, and business licenses; handling the issuance of Notary Publics; titling of vehicles. Also: clerk of the County Commission, maintaining the official County Commission Minutes	
Register of Deeds	Shelly Yates	primary function: recording and preserving documents, including, but not limited to: deeds, powers of attorneys, mortgages, liens, contracts, leases, military discharges, judgments, greenbelt assessments, and subdivision plats; provides information to attorneys, realtors, surveyors, appraisers, lending institutions and the general public	
Highway Chief Administrative Officer	Jackie Hodges	Oversees the Highway Department; maintain county roads, including paving, grading, tar & sealing, ditching, salting and snow removal	
Sheriff	Tim Eads	The chief law enforcement official of the county. Also is responsible for the management of the jail.	
Trustee	Glynda Barrett Pendergrass	Acts as treasurer of Dickson County Government, including the Dickson County School System; collects all real and personal property taxes; keeps an account of all money received for County Government; invests temporarily idle County funds; disperses sales tax revenues	

==== Department heads ====
The Mayor makes the appointments for non-elected county government departments.

Dickson County government department heads
Department	Head
Accounts and Budgets	Don Hall
Emergency Medical Service (Ambulance)	Donny Bear
Archives	Pam Edwards
Emergency Management Agency/Fire	Rob Fisher
Maintenance	W. H. Batey
Planning and Zoning	David Darnell
Solid Waste Management	Jim Lunn

=== Judicial branch officials ===
The judicial officials are chosen in the August general elections, along with other elected officials and county commissioners, and serve four-year terms (with the exception of the General Sessions and the Juvenile Court Judges, who serve an eight-year term, with elections coinciding with every other gubernatorial primary). These elections coincide with the state's gubernatorial primaries and they assume office on September 1 of each non-presidential even-numbered year.

Current judicial officials
Office	Name	Duties	Citation
Circuit Court Clerk	Pam Lewis	acts as the principal administrative aide to the Circuit Court; provides assistance in the areas of the courtroom administration and records management, docket maintenance, revenue management, maintenance of court minutes; holds the position of jury coordinator for the court system.	
Clerk and Master	Lynn Collins	deals with all types of civil cases such as divorces, custody, child support, adoptions, worker's compensation, contracts, debts, and property disputes; acts as the principal administrative aide to the Chancery Court; provides assistance in the areas of the courtroom administration and records management, docket maintenance, revenue management, maintenance of court minutes; collects Delinquent Taxes	
General Sessions/Juvenile Court Clerk	Leslie Shelton	some of the entities served: Dickson County Sheriff's Office, TN Department of Safety Troopers, Judicial Drug Task Force, TWRA, Department of Conservation, Tennessee ABC, TBI, Burns City Officers, Cities of Charlotte and Vanleer	
General Sessions Court Judge	Craig Monsue	files and manages the court files and dockets for both criminal and civil cases; attends court session, administers oaths, and retains, preserves, and files all papers.	
Juvenile Court Judge	Jarred Creasy	handles cases for: conservatorships, guardianships, paternity, legitimation, name changes, minors settlement cases, and child support; custody cases involving dependent and neglected children and cases of termination of parental rights; delinquent, unruly and traffic cases for juveniles and contributing cases for adults	

== Education ==
The Dickson County School District serves the entirety of the county. Since 2024, the current Director of Schools is Dr. Christie Southerland.

Serving around 8,500 students, the Dickson County School System ranks 23rd in student population among 142 school districts in Tennessee. The District employs around 1,200 people.

=== Board of education ===
The Dickson County Board of Education is a committee of six elected officials responsible for governing the counties' educational system. Each member represents one of the six districts that make up Dickson County. The Board was created and empowered by State Law with authority to oversee the operation of Dickson County Schools. The Board meets every 4th Thursday of the month unless otherwise noted.

The Board chooses the Director of Schools. Dr. Christie Southerland is the Director of Schools and has been in that position since 2024.

Current Board Members
District	Name	Notes
1	Robyn Lampley	
2	Sonya Brogdon	
3	Steve Haley	
4	Phil Chadwick	
5	Sherri Thiel	
6	Aaron Parker	

=== History ===
Prior to the 1920s, numerous private high schools and colleges existed in Dickson County. These included the Tracy Academy, Charlotte Female School, Alexander Campbell School, Edgewood Academy and Normal College, the Dickson Academy, Dickson Normal School (where Hattie Carraway, the first woman elected to the U.S. Senate, was educated), Glenwylde Academy, and Ruskin Cave College. Most of these closed before or during the Great Depression. As is typical of most Tennessee counties, all public schools of the county are currently operated by a single county-wide school district.

=== Schools ===
The Dickson County Board of Education operates 16 schools.

Elementary Schools

- Centennial
- Charlotte
- Dickson
- Oakmont
- The Discovery School
- Sullivan
- Stuart-Burns
- Vanleer
- White Bluff

Middle Schools

- Charlotte
- Burns
- Dickson
- William James

High Schools

- Creek Wood
- Dickson County

Alternative School

- New Directions Academy

=== Higher Education ===
Dickson County is home to two campuses for higher education.

The Tennessee College of Applied Technology – Dickson, under the Tennessee Board of Regents, provides career and technical education programs. Some programs include administrative office technology, automotive technology, computer information technology, cosmetology, various health programs (dental, nursing, etc.), digital graphic design, HVAC/refrigeration, mechatronics, and welding, among many others.

Nashville State Community College maintains a satellite campus in Dickson, offering associate degrees to prepare students to transfer to four-year universities or enter the workforce.

== Communities ==
=== City ===
- Dickson

=== Towns ===
- Burns
- Charlotte (county seat)
- Slayden
- Vanleer
- White Bluff

=== Unincorporated communities ===
- Abiff
- Bellsburg
- Cumberland Furnace
- Promise Land
- Tennessee City
- Sylvia

== See also ==
- National Register of Historic Places listings in Dickson County, Tennessee
