= Stones River Greenway Arboretum =

Arboretum in Murfreesboro, Tennessee

- Location within Tennessee
- Type: Arboretum
- Location: Rutherford County, Tennessee, United States
- Coordinates: 35°47′11″N 86°24′58″W
- Elevation: 600 to 800 ft (180 to 240 m)
- Established: 2003
- Operator: City of Murfreesboro; Parks & Recreation Commission

The Stones River Greenway Arboretum is an arboretum located along the Stones River Greenway, beside the Stones River, in Murfreesboro, Tennessee.

The arboretum contains species native to the area, many were originally on the site when it was established. Species include hardwoods at the higher elevations, and softwoods in the lower areas. This arboretum was certified as a Level 1 arboretum by the Tennessee Urban Forestry Council in 2003. Access is available through a number of Greenway trailheads throughout Murfreesboro.

== See also ==
- List of botanical gardens in the United States
