= Cumberland Furnace, Tennessee =

Human settlement in Tennessee, U.S.

Cumberland Furnace
- Unincorporated community
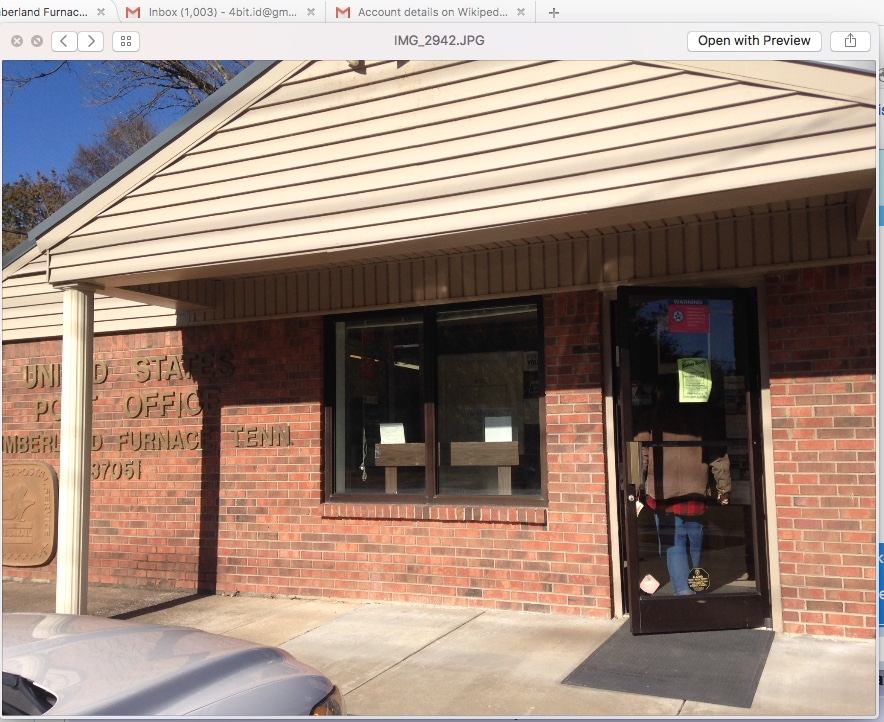
- Cumberland Furnace Post Office

- Location within Tennessee Location within the United States
- Coordinates: 36°16′07″N 87°21′35″W
- Country: United States
- State: Tennessee
- County: Dickson
- Elevation: 518 ft (158 m)
- Time zone: UTC-6 (Central (CST))
  - Summer (DST): UTC-5 (CDT)
- ZIP Code: 37051
- Area codes: 615, Overlay 629
- GNIS feature ID: 1281828

Cumberland Furnace is an unincorporated community in Dickson County, Tennessee, United States. Cumberland Furnace is served by a U.S. Post Office, ZIP Code 37051.

== History ==
General James Robertson purchased the land now known as Cumberland Furnace in 1793 and constructed the first furnace.

In 1804, Montgomery Bell moved to Middle Tennessee and purchased James Robertson's iron works business for $16,000. Bell expanded his operations and constructed other furnaces and mills, including a hammer mill south of Charlotte on Jones Creek utilizing waterpower.

By 1808, Bell was buying wood at 50 cents per cord for charcoal to fuel his furnaces, which cast cannonballs were utilized in the War of 1812 by General Andrew Jackson's troops at the Battle of New Orleans.

A nearby unincorporated community where many of Bell's workers lived is called Bell Town. Bell suffered losses in the Panic of 1819, and in 1824, he advertised the Narrows and other properties for sale in the Nashville Whig. Bell offered to sell his ironworks to the U.S. Army to be used for an armory; however, floods on the Harpeth were well known and that idea failed.

Bell sold the ironworks to Anthony Wayne Van Leer, who was a member of a well-known family in Pennsylvania and noted in the anti-slavery cause. His mansion was also used as a Union headquarters. Van Leer's granddaughter married a Union Captain James P. Drouillard and built what is now known as the Drouillard House on his property. Captain Drouillard operated the furnace until it was sold in 1889 to the Southern Iron Company.

The Cumberland Furnace Historic District was designated on September 28, 1988, and listed on the National Register of Historic Places.
