= Clement Railroad Hotel Museum =

- Halbrook Hotel
- U.S. National Register of Historic Places
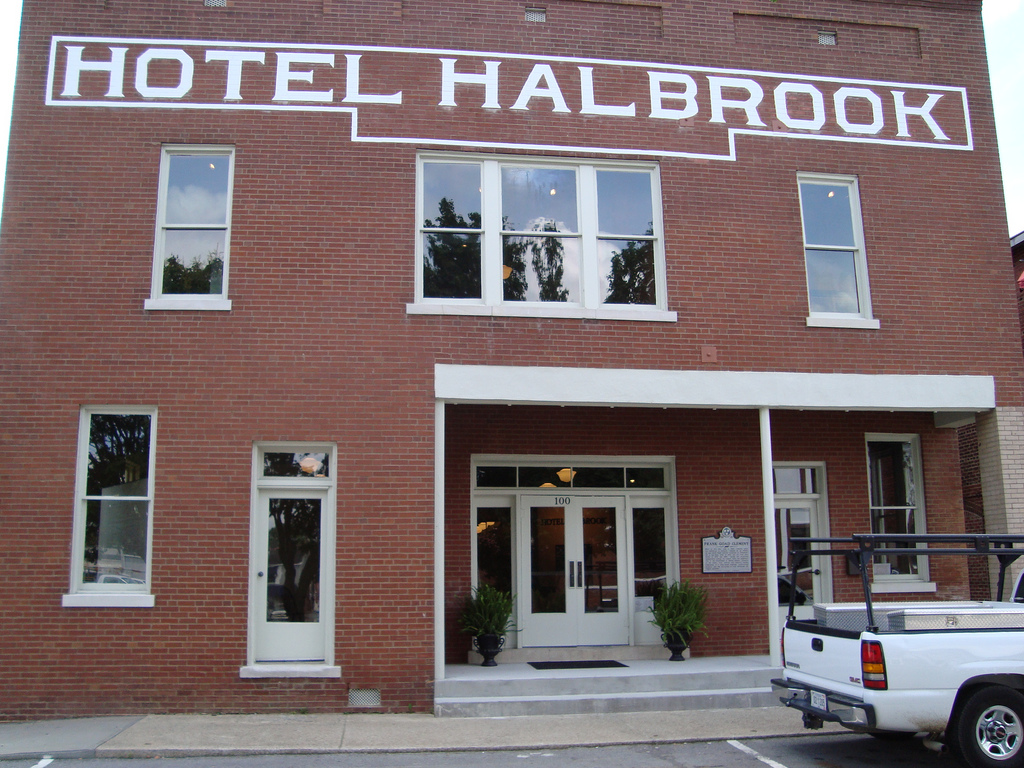
- Clement Railroad Hotel Museum

- Location within Tennessee Location within the United States
- Location: 100 Clement Pl., Dickson, Tennessee
- Coordinates: 36°4′30″N 87°23′22″W
- Built: 1913
- Architect: Ridings, R. F.
- Architectural style: Early Commercial
- NRHP reference No.: 90000915
- Added to NRHP: June 14, 1990

The Clement Railroad Hotel Museum, housed in the Tennessee Historical Commission’s Hotel Halbrook State Historic Site and operated by the Governor Frank G. Clement Railroad Hotel and Historical Museum Corporation, Inc. The building is one of the few remaining examples of a railroad hotel in the State of Tennessee. It is located in historic downtown Dickson, Tennessee and since opening on June 2, 2009, the museum has hosted thousands of visitors.

Originally constructed in 1913 the Hotel Halbrook operated as a working hotel until economic factors forced its closure in 1954. Today, museum features exhibits and programming involving the history of Dickson County, Tennessee, the American Civil War, the history of the Hotel Halbrook, the American Civil Rights Movement, and the life and career of Tennessee Governor Frank G. Clement, who was born in the hotel on June 02, 1920.

Owned by the State of Tennessee, the Clement Railroad Hotel Museum is one of the Tennessee Historical Commission's State Historic Sites, and is listed in the National Register of Historic Places. The museum receives a partial annual operating grant from the Tennessee Historical Commission. The museum is located at 100 Clement Place, or 100 Frank G. Clement Place, in Dickson, Tennessee. It was restored and opened to the public in 2009.

== Museum exhibitions ==
=== Railroading ===
Artifacts include an oilcan, brake wheel, whistle marker, lantern, maps, postcards, and books. A folk art model of an engine and tender are almost miniature examples of an NC&St.L engine and Vanderbilt tender captured in a 1920s photograph in Dickson. This exhibit has been expanded to include a touch-screen panel of the Dickson rail-yard and downtown area. A hands-on display of a steam engine cabin, and a NC&St.L engine headlight are also showcased.

=== The Clement family ===
The Clement family rooms are furnished to represent the early 1920s when Belle Goad and Maybelle and Robert Clement lived in the managerial suite of rooms on the first floor. Room #5, where Governor Frank Clement was born, is furnished with several pieces of furniture from the Clement family including a bed, trunk, and cradle.

=== Dickson County industries ===
The Dickson County Commerce exhibit has interpretive panels on several early businesses and industries. This exhibit includes the display of a Dixie Swatter baseball bat which was used by major league teams during the 1920s and a Commodore youth bat, a 1930s Coca-Cola bottle impressed with 'Dickson Tenn.' on the bottom, and the 50-millionth shirt made by Red Kap.

The Dickson County History exhibit tells the story of the iron ore industry in the county as well as highlighting each of the incorporated communities: Burns, Charlotte, Slayden, Vanleer, White Bluff, and Dickson. Interpretive panels introduce visitors to the utopian community of Ruskin and Promise Land, a community founded by freed blacks.

=== Dickson Model Railroad display ===
The Dickson Model Railroad Club has partnered with the Clement Railroad Hotel Museum to establish a permanent display of model trains, landscaping, and buildings. The display is staffed by volunteer "engineers" who maintain the trains as well as both entertain and educate visitors in the art of model railroading. This exhibit recreates the Dickson Rail-yard during the 1920s and 1930s.

=== Governor Clement ===
On the second floor of the museum, three exhibits on Governor Clement can be found. Visitors will follow Clement from his early days in Dickson to his gubernatorial campaigns in the 1952, 1954, and 1962. Guests will learn about Clement's many accomplishments; including his actions desegregating Tennessee, supporting the Civil Rights Movement, providing free textbooks for Tennessee school children and the establishment of the South's first community college system, establishment of the state's first department of mental health, and the expansion of roads through the Interstate system in Tennessee. The property was listed on the National Register of Historic Places in 1990 as Halbrook Hotel.
