= Burns, Tennessee =

- Town
- Motto: A hometown community
- Location of Burns in Dickson County, Tennessee.
- Coordinates: 36°3′15″N 87°18′58″W
- Country: United States
- State: Tennessee
- County: Dickson

Government
  - Type: Mayor-Council
  - Mayor: Landon Mathis
  - Vice Mayor: Ed Grove

Area
  - Total: 3.39 sq mi (8.77 km^{2})
  - Land: 3.38 sq mi (8.76 km^{2})
  - Water: 0.0039 sq mi (0.01 km^{2})
- Elevation: 801 ft (244 m)

Population (2020)
  - Total: 1,573
  - Density: 465.2/sq mi (179.62/km^{2})
- Time zone: UTC-6 (Central (CST))
  - Summer (DST): UTC-5 (CDT)
- ZIP code: 37029
- Area code: 615
- FIPS code: 47-09880
- GNIS feature ID: 1305550
- Website: http://townofburnstn.net

Burns is a town in Dickson County, Tennessee, in the United States. It is part of the Nashville-Davidson–Murfreesboro–Franklin, TN Metropolitan Statistical Area. As of the 2020 census, Burns had a population of 1,573.

== Geography ==
Burns is located in southeastern Dickson County at 36°3′15″N 87°18′58″W (36.054264, -87.315978). It is bordered to the southwest, west, and northwest by the city of Dickson. Tennessee State Route 47 passes through the center of the town, leading west 5 miles (8 km) to the center of Dickson and northeast 7 miles (11 km) to White Bluff. Tennessee State Route 96 passes through the town west and south of its center; it leads northwest 2.5 miles (4.0 km) to U.S. Route 70 and southeast 8 miles (13 km) to Interstate 40 within the city limits of Fairview.

According to the United States Census Bureau, Burns has a total area of 3.7 square miles (9.7 km^{2}), of which 0.01 square miles (0.02 km^{2}), or 0.16%, is water.

== Demographics ==
Historical population
Census	Pop.	Note	%±
1960	386		—
1970	456		18.1%
1980	777		70.4%
1990	1,127		45.0%
2000	1,366		21.2%
2010	1,468		7.5%
2020	1,573		7.2%

=== 2020 census ===
Burns racial composition
Race	Number	Percentage
White (non-Hispanic)	1,397	88.81%
Black or African American (non-Hispanic)	29	1.84%
Native American	5	0.32%
Asian	8	0.51%
Pacific Islander	2	0.13%
Other/Mixed	64	4.07%
Hispanic or Latino	68	4.32%

As of the 2020 United States census, there were 1,573 people, 627 households, and 460 families residing in the town.

=== 2000 census ===
As of the census of 2000, there were 1,366 people, 549 households, and 396 families residing in the town. The population density was 525.2 inhabitants per square mile (202.8/km^{2}). There were 582 housing units at an average density of 223.8 per square mile (86.4/km^{2}). The racial makeup of the town was 96.19% White, 1.76% African American, 0.95% Native American, 0.37% from other races, and 0.73% from two or more races. Hispanic or Latino of any race were 0.51% of the population.

There were 549 households, out of which 32.2% had children under the age of 18 living with them, 54.5% were married couples living together, 12.8% had a female householder with no husband present, and 27.7% were non-families. 21.7% of all households were made up of individuals, and 7.8% had someone living alone who was 65 years of age or older. The average household size was 2.48 and the average family size was 2.84.

In the town, the population was spread out, with 23.1% under the age of 18, 8.6% from 18 to 24, 33.2% from 25 to 44, 23.1% from 45 to 64, and 12.0% who were 65 years of age or older. The median age was 36 years. For every 100 females, there were 98.3 males. For every 100 females age 18 and over, there were 94.8 males.

The median income for a household in the town was $38,641, and the median income for a family was $43,370. Males had a median income of $31,827 versus $22,171 for females. The per capita income for the town was $18,368. About 3.3% of families and 4.6% of the population were below the poverty line, including 6.4% of those under age 18 and 11.0% of those age 65 or over.

== Government ==
The entire city charter is available here.

The Burns City Council acts as the unicameral legislative body for the Town of Burns. All four seats are elected from at-large districts every two years. Work sessions are held the third Monday of each month, and Council meetings are held on the second Monday of every month.

The Mayor of Burns serves as the town executive and is elected every two years. The current mayor is Rusty Grove.
