= Tennessee State Route 54 =

Highway in Tennessee

State Route 54
- SR 54; primary in red, secondary in blue, unsigned in green

Route information
- Maintained by TDOT
- Length: 122.52 mi (197.18 km)
- Existed: October 1, 1923–present

Major junctions
- West end: US 51 / SR 59 in Covington
- SR 14 in Glenn; SR 19 in Brownsville; US 412 in Alamo; SR 457 in Trenton; US 45W in Trenton; SR 77 / SR 104 in Trenton; US 45E in Bradford; SR 22 in Dresden; SR 218 in Paris; US 641 / SR 69 / SR 356 in Paris
- East end: US 641 / KY 893 at Tennessee-Kentucky border near Hazel, KY

Location
- Country: United States
- State: Tennessee
- Counties: Tipton, Haywood, Crockett, Gibson, Weakley, Henry

Highway system
- Tennessee State Routes; Interstate; US; State
← SR 53	→ I-55

State Route 54 (SR 54) is a west–east rural highway in West Tennessee, which runs from Covington to just north of Paris.

== Route description ==
=== Covington to Alamo ===
SR 54 begins in downtown Covington in Tipton County at an intersection with US 51/SR 3. It then goes to a junction with SR 384. Shortly afterwards, it has a junction with SR 179. SR 54 then exits Covington and continues to the east, passing through Glenn and having an intersection with SR 14, which is its northern terminus. SR 54 then continues east and crosses into Haywood County. It then enters Brownsville and intersects SR 19, just a short distance away from its junction with US 70. It continues into town and has a junction with SR 1 (Old US 70) and begins a short concurrency together, and comes to a junction in the center of town with SR 76 and SR 369 and turns north to become concurrent with them, separating from SR 1. Just outside of town, SR 54 separates from SR 76/SR 369 and continues north. It then goes through Belle Eagle and crosses into Crockett County. It then comes to a junction with SR 88 and turns east to become concurrent with it and intersects with SR 188 almost immediately. It then comes to an interchange with US 412/SR 20 before entering Alamo. In the center of downtown, SR 54/SR 88 has an intersection with SR 221 and turns north, separating from SR 88. SR 54 continues north and has a junction SR 152 before entering Gibson County.

=== Gibson County ===
After entering Gibson County, SR 54 then goes through Frog Jump and intersects SR 457 before entering Trenton. There, SR 54 has a junction with SR 367. It continues and has a junction with US 45W/SR 5, turning north to run concurrently with it, and has a junction with SR 186. They continue north and have an intersection with SR 77/SR 104. US 45W and SR 54 separate, with SR 54 turning northeast and exiting Trenton. It then intersects SR 185. It then enters Bradford and comes to an intersection with US 45E/SR 43, turns north, and runs concurrently with it, bypassing Bradford to the east. It then comes to a junction with SR 105 (Old US 45E), and exits Bradford.

=== Weakley and Henry Counties ===
SR 54 then enters Weakley County and enters Greenfield. in downtown, it intersects with SR 124. SR 54 then separates from US 45E and turns east, and exits Greenfield. It then curves to the northeast, then north, and enters Dresden, immediately having an intersection with SR 22. A short distance away, it has a junction with SR 89/SR 239, with SR 239 ending and SR 89 running concurrently with SR 54. They continue into downtown, then turn east, and intersect SR 118. They continue east together before separating and SR 54 continues east alone, having an intersection and short concurrency with SR 217 shortly afterwards. Further east it has an intersection and short concurrency with SR 190, and continuing east. SR 54 then crosses into Henry County, enters Como, and intersects with SR 140. It then continues east and has a junction with SR 218 before entering Paris. In Paris, it becomes concurrent with SR 69, and continues into downtown, where it comes to an intersection with US 641 and SR 356, with SR 69 turning south on US 641, SR 356 continuing straight, and SR 54 becomes the unsigned companion of US 641. They run north together to Puryear, where there is another intersection with SR 140. They continue north to the Kentucky state line just south of Hazel, Kentucky, where US 641 crosses into Kentucky while SR 54 ends there.

The route's concurrencies include:

- SR 88 from Brims Corner to Alamo,
- US 45W (SR 5) through the city of Trenton,
- US 45E (SR 43) from Bradford to Greenfield,
- SR 89 through the city of Dresden, and
- US 641 (hidden designation) from Paris to the Kentucky state line.

== Major intersections ==
County	Location	mi	km	Destinations	Notes
Tipton	Covington	0.00	0.00	US 51 / SR 59 (Highway 51 N/SR 3/West Liberty Avenue) – Brighton, Burlison, Gilt Edge, Henning	Western terminus; SR 54 begins as a primary highway
Tipton	Covington			SR 54 west (Liberty Street)	One way street; westbound SR 54 only
Tipton	Covington			SR 384 (East Street)	
Tipton	Covington			SR 179 east – Stanton	Western terminus of SR 179
Haywood				SR 14 west (Austin Peay Highway) – Rosemark, Memphis	Northern terminus of SR 14
Haywood	Brownsville			SR 19 (Ah Gray/CA Rawls Bypass) – Ripley	SR 54 turns secondary
Haywood	Brownsville			South Grand Avenue	Old US 70/79 (SR 1) South
Haywood	Brownsville			East Main Street	Old US 70/79 (SR 1) North
Haywood	Brownsville			SR 369 east (Washington Boulevard) to US 79 / US 70A – Humboldt	Old US 70A/SR 76; western terminus of SR 369
Crockett	Brims Corner			SR 88 west – Maury City	Western end of SR 88 concurrency
Crockett	Brims Corner			SR 188 north – Crockett Mills	Southern terminus of SR 188
Crockett				US 412 (SR 20) – Dyersburg, Jackson	Interchange
Crockett	Alamo			SR 88 east (South Bells Street) / SR 221 east (East Church Street) – Bells, Gadsden	Eastern end of SR 88 concurrency; Western terminus of SR 221
Crockett	Quincy			SR 152 (Nichols Road) – Humboldt	
Gibson	Trenton			SR 457 (West Bypass)	
Gibson	Trenton			SR 367 (South College Street)	
Gibson	Trenton			US 45W south (Highway 45 Bypass South/SR 5 south) – Humboldt, Jackson	Southern end of US 45W/SR 5 Concurrency
Gibson	Trenton			SR 186 east (Gibson Highway) – Gibson	Western terminus of SR 186
Gibson	Trenton			SR 104 / SR 77 east (E Eaton Street) – Trenton, Milan	Southern end of SR 77 concurrency
Gibson	Trenton			US 45W north / SR 77 north (Highway 45 Bypass North/SR 5 north) – Dyer, Union City	Northern end of SR 77 and US 45W/SR 5 concurrency
Gibson				SR 185 west – Dyer	Eastern terminus of SR 185
Gibson	Bradford			US 45E south (SR 43 south) – Milan	Southern end of US 45E/SR 43 concurrency
Gibson	Bradford			SR 105 (Rutherford Highway) – Bradford, Rutherford	SR 105 east is Old US 45E
Weakley	Greenfield			SR 124 east (Main Street) – McKenzie	Western terminus of SR 124
Weakley	Greenfield			US 45E north (N Meridian Street/SR 43 north) – Martin, South Fulton	Northern end of US 45E/SR 43 concurrency
Weakley	Dresden			SR 22 – Martin, McKenzie	SR 54 turns primary
Weakley	Dresden			SR 89 west (Pikeview Street)	Western end of SR 89 concurrency
Weakley	Dresden			SR 118 north (Wilson Street)	Southern terminus of SR 118
Weakley	Dresden			SR 89 east (Taylor Street) – Palmersville	Eastern end of SR 89 concurrency
Weakley	Dresden			SR 217 north (Klutts Road)	Western end of SR 217 concurrency
Weakley	Dresden			SR 217 south (County Maintenance Road)	Eastern end of SR 217 concurrency
Weakley				SR 190 south (Gleason Como Road) – Gleason	Western end of SR 190 concurrency
Weakley				SR 190 north – Palmersville	Eastern end of SR 190 concurrency
Henry	Como			SR 140 (Verdell Store Road) – Cottage Grove, McKenzie	
Henry	Paris			SR 218 (Highway 218 By-pass)	Beltway around Paris
Henry	Paris			SR 69 north – Cottage Grove	Western end of SR 69 concurrency
Henry	Paris			US 641 south (Market Street/SR 69 south) / SR 356 east (E Wood Street) to US 79 – Camden	Eastern end of SR 69 concurrency; Southern end of US 641 concurrency; western terminus of SR 356; SR 54 becomes unsigned
Henry	Puryear			SR 140 east (Poplar Street) – Paris Landing State Park, Buchanan	Southern end of SR 140 concurrency
Henry	Puryear			SR 140 west (W Chestnut Street) – Cottage Grove	Northern end of SR 140 concurrency
Henry		122.52	197.18	US 641 north (Main Street) / KY 893 (State Line Road) – Hazel, Murray	SR 54 ends at state line; US 641 continues solo into Kentucky; State line coincides with KY 893 west and the Hazel, KY city limits
1.000 mi = 1.609 km; 1.000 km = 0.621 mi: Concurrency terminus
