= Tennessee State Route 105 =

Highway in Tennessee

State Route 105
- SR 105 highlighted in red

Route information
- Maintained by TDOT
- Length: 44.34 mi (71.36 km)

Major junctions
- West end: Future I-69 / US 51 just west of Trimble
- US 45W in Rutherford; US 45E / SR 54 just north of Bradford; US 79 in Trezevant
- East end: US 70A in McLemoresville

Location
- Country: United States
- State: Tennessee
- Counties: Obion, Dyer, Gibson, Carroll

Highway system
- Tennessee State Routes; Interstate; US; State
← SR 104	→ SR 106

State Route 105 (SR 105) is a 44.34-mile-long (71.36 km) east–west state highway in West Tennessee. It traverses mainly rural areas and farmland.

== Route description ==
=== Obion and Dyer counties ===
SR 105 begins on the Obion-Dyer county line at an interchange with US 51/SR 3 (Future I-69). It goes east to enter Dyer County and Trimble to have an intersection with SR 211. It then passes through town to have an intersection with SR 89 before turning south, where the highway then leaves Trimble and winds its way southeast through farmland to cross into Gibson County.

=== Gibson County ===
SR 105 turns east and heads toward Rutherford, where it has an interchange with US 45W/SR 5. It then passes through downtown, where it runs along Trenton Street, the former route of US 45W. The highway then leaves Rutherford and continues east to cross the Rutherford Fork of the Obion River and have an intersection with SR 445. SR 105 then turns southeast and begins to run parallel South Fork of the Obion River as it enters Bradford, where it has an intersection with US 45E/SR 43 and a concurrency with SR 54 through downtown. The highway then leaves Bradford and winds its way southeast to cross into Carroll County.

=== Carroll County ===
SR 105 then enters Trezevant and has intersections with SR 190 and US 79/SR 76. The highway then leaves Trezevant and continues southeast to enter McLemoresville and comes to an end at an intersection with US 70A/SR 77.

=== Other information ===
The entire route of SR 105 is a rural two-lane highway.

== Major intersections ==
County	Location	mi	km	Destinations	Notes
Obion–Dyer county line		0.0	0.0	Future I-69 / US 51 (SR 3) – Dyersburg, Union City	Western terminus; interchange
Dyer	Trimble			SR 211 south – Newbern	Current northern terminus of SR 211
Dyer	Trimble			SR 89 north (College Street) – Mason Hall, Kenton	Southern terminus of SR 89
Gibson	Rutherford			US 45W (SR 5) – Dyer, Kenton	Interchange
Gibson				Bridge over the Rutherford Fork of the Obion River	
Gibson				SR 445 east (Walnut Grove Road) – Greenfield	Western terminus of SR 445; provides access to Big Cypress Tree State Park
Gibson	Bradford			US 45E / SR 54 east (SR 43) – Milan, Greenfield	Western end of wrong-way SR 54 concurrency
Gibson	Bradford			SR 54 west (W Main Street) – Trenton	Eastern end of wrong-way SR 54 concurrency
Carroll	Trezevant			SR 190 north (Pinson Street) – Gleason	Southern terminus of SR 190
Carroll	Trezevant			US 79 (Broad Street/SR 76) – Atwood, McKenzie	
Carroll	McLemoresville	44.34	71.36	US 70A (Main Street/SR 77) – Atwood, Huntingdon	Eastern terminus
1.000 mi = 1.609 km; 1.000 km = 0.621 mi: Concurrency terminus
