= Tennessee State Route 190 =

State highway in Tennessee, United States

State Route 190
- SR 190 highlighted in red

Route information
- Maintained by TDOT
- Length: 55.3 mi (89.0 km)
- Existed: July 1, 1983–present

Major junctions
- South end: SR 105 in Trezevant
- SR 22 in Gleason; SR 54 near Como; SR 89 in Palmersville
- North end: US 45E near South Fulton

Location
- Country: United States
- State: Tennessee
- Counties: Carroll, Weakley, Obion

Highway system
- Tennessee State Routes; Interstate; US; State
← SR 189	→ SR 191

State Route 190 (SR 190) is a 55.3-mile-long (89.0 km) north–south state highway that traverses the farmland of West Tennessee. It connects Trezevant and South Fulton via Pillowville, Gleason, Palmersville, and Latham.

== Route description ==
SR 190 begins in Carroll County in Trezevant at an intersection with SR 105. It heads north to cross the South Fork of the Obion River to pass through rural areas before entering Weakley County. The highway winds its way north through farmland to pass through the community of Pillowville, where it has an intersection with SR 124. SR 190 then winds its way northeast to enter Gleason, where it passes through town along College Street, N Cedar Street, and E Union Street. It then has an intersection with SR 22 before leaving Gleason and continuing east, then north, to pass through wooded areas, where it crosses a bridge over the Middle Fork of Obion River. The highway has a short concurrency with SR 54 before winding its way northwest to pass through Palmersville, where it has an intersection with SR 89. SR 190 now turns due west as it winds its way through farmland to enter the community of Latham and come to an intersection with SR 118. It turns north along SR 118 to cross the North Fork of the Obion River before turning west again along Chestnut Glade Road. The highway winds it way through farmland for the next several miles as it follows Grissom Road, Vaughn Road, and Ruthville Road before it crosses into Obion County. SR 190 becomes McConnell Road as it turns southwest to come to an end at an intersection with US 45E/SR 43 between South Fulton and Martin. The entire route of SR 190 is a two-lane highway.

== Major intersections ==
County	Location	mi	km	Destinations	Notes
Carroll	Trezevant	0.0	0.0	SR 105 (Main Street) – McLemoresville, Bradford	Southern terminus
Carroll				Bridge over the South Fork of the Obion River	
Weakley	Pillowville			SR 124 – Greenfield, McKenzie	
Weakley	Gleason			SR 22 – Dresden, McKenzie	
Weakley				Bridge over the Middle Fork of the Obion River	
Weakley				SR 54 west – Dresden	Southern end of SR 54 concurrency
Weakley				SR 54 east – Como, Paris	Northern end of SR 54 concurrency
Weakley	Palmersville			SR 89 (Palmersville Road) – Dresden, Mayfield, KY	
Weakley	Latham			SR 118 south – Dresden	Southern end of SR 118 concurrency
Weakley				Bridge over the North Fork of the Obion River	
Weakley				SR 118 north – Dukedom	Northern end of SR 118 concurrency
Obion		55.3	89.0	US 45E (SR 43) – South Fulton, Martin	Northern terminus
1.000 mi = 1.609 km; 1.000 km = 0.621 mi: Concurrency terminus
