= Tennessee State Route 118 =

State highway in Tennessee, United States

State Route 118
- SR 118 highlighted in red

Route information
- Maintained by TDOT
- Length: 14.81 mi (23.83 km)

Major junctions
- South end: SR 54 / SR 89 in Dresden
- SR 190 in Latham
- North end: KY 129 at the Kentucky state line in Dukedom

Location
- Country: United States
- State: Tennessee
- Counties: Weakley

Highway system
- Tennessee State Routes; Interstate; US; State
← SR 117	→ SR 119

State Route 118 (SR 118) is a 14.81-mile-long (23.83 km) north–south state highway in Weakley County, Tennessee. It connects the town of Dresden with the communities of Latham, Dukedom, and the state of Kentucky.

== Route description ==
SR 118 begins in downtown Dresden at an intersection with SR 54/SR 89 (Main Street), directly beside the Weakley County Courthouse. It goes north as N Wilson Street past homes and businesses before leaving Dresden and continuing north through a mix of farmland and wooded areas. The highway then passes through Latham, where it has an intersection and short concurrency with SR 190 and crosses the North Fork of the Obion River. SR 118 continues north through farmland to enter Dukedom, where it comes to an end at an intersection with Kentucky Route 129 (KY 129) at the Kentucky state line. The entire route of SR 118 is a two-lane highway.

== Major intersections ==
The entire route is in Weakley County.

Location	mi	km	Destinations	Notes
Dresden	0.0	0.0	SR 54 / SR 89 (Main Street) – Greenfield, Sharon, Palmersville, Paris	Southern terminus
Latham	9.2	14.8	SR 190 south (Latham Highway) – Palmersville	Southern end of SR 190 concurrency
	9.8	15.8	Bridge over the North Fork of the Obion River	
	10.5	16.9	SR 190 north (Chestnut Glade Road) – South Fulton	Northern end of SR 190 concurrency
Dukedom	14.81	23.83	KY 129 (State Line Road/State Highway 129) – Fulton, Pilot Oak	Kentucky state line; northern terminus
1.000 mi = 1.609 km; 1.000 km = 0.621 mi: Concurrency terminus
