= Tennessee State Route 89 =

State highway in Tennessee, United States

State Route 89
- SR 89 highlighted in red

Route information
- Maintained by TDOT
- Length: 51.24 mi (82.46 km)

Major junctions
- South end: SR 105 in Trimble
- US 45W in Kenton; US 45E in Sharon; SR 22 in Dresden; SR 54 / SR 118 in Dresden
- North end: KY 381 at the Kentucky state line near Boydsville

Location
- Country: United States
- State: Tennessee
- Counties: Dyer, Gibson, Weakley

Highway system
- Tennessee State Routes; Interstate; US; State
← SR 88	→ SR 90

State Route 89 (SR 89) is a north-south state highway in the farmland of West Tennessee. The route is 51.24 miles (82.46 km) long.

== Route description ==
The first few miles of SR 89 hugs the Dyer-Gibson County line. SR 89 then intersects US 45W and US 45E, in the towns of Kenton and Sharon, respectively. SR 89 enters Weakley County and crosses the Rutherford and South Forks of the Obion River between those two intersections. East of Sharon, SR 89 then turns northeastward to the Weakley County seat, Dresden, where it intersects State Routes 22, 239, 54, and 118. Further northeast, SR 89 intersects SR 190 and crosses the North Fork of the Obion River at Palmersville before reaching its northern terminus at the Kentucky state line. This is where the road continues as Kentucky Route 381 into southern Graves County.

== Major intersections ==
County	Location	mi	km	Destinations	Notes
Dyer–Gibson county line	Trimble	0.0	0.0	SR 105 (Pierce Street/College Street) to US 51 – Rutherford	Southern terminus
Gibson	Kenton			US 45W (Poplar Street/SR 5) – Union City, Trenton	
Weakley	Sharon			US 45E (SR 43) – Martin, Jackson	Interchange
Weakley	Dresden			SR 22 – Martin, McKenzie	
Weakley	Dresden			SR 239 west (Pikeview Street)	Eastern terminus of SR 239
Weakley	Dresden			SR 54 south (Morrow Street) – Greenfield	Southern end of SR 54 concurrency
Weakley	Dresden			SR 118 north (N Wilson Street)	Southern terminus of SR 118
Weakley	Dresden			SR 54 north (E Main Street) – Paris	Northern end of SR 54 concurrency
Weakley	Dresden			SR 217 south (Klutts Road)	Northern terminus of SR 217
Weakley	Palmersville			SR 190 (Little Zion Road/Latham Highway)	
Weakley		51.24	82.46	KY 381 north – Sedalia, Mayfield	Kentucky state line; northern terminus
1.000 mi = 1.609 km; 1.000 km = 0.621 mi: Concurrency terminus
