= Tennessee State Route 445 =

Road in Tennessee, United States of America

State Route 445
- SR 445 highlighted in red

Route information
- Maintained by TDOT
- Length: 12.6 mi (20.3 km)

Major junctions
- West end: SR 105 just east of Rutherford
- East end: US 45E in Greenfield

Location
- Country: United States
- State: Tennessee
- Counties: Gibson, Weakley

Highway system
- Tennessee State Routes; Interstate; US; State
← SR 444	→ SR 446

State Route 445 (SR 445) is a 12.6 mile long east-west state highway in West Tennessee. It connects the towns of Rutherford and Greenfield and provides access to Big Cypress Tree State Park.

== Route description ==
SR 445 begins in Gibson County at an intersection with SR 105, just across the Rutherford Fork of the Obion River from the town of Rutherford. It goes north along Walnut Grove Road through rural areas before turning east along Toole-Pate Levee Road. The highway then crosses a bridge over the South Fork of the Obion River shortly before crossing into Weakley County. The highway now becomes Kimery Store Road and has an intersection with Big Cypress Road, the access road to Big Cypress Tree State Park. SR 445 then enters Greenfield, where it comes to an end at an intersection with US 45E/SR 43 at the northern edge of town. The entire route of SR 445 is a two-lane highway.

== Major intersections ==
County	Location	mi	km	Destinations	Notes
Gibson		0.0	0.0	SR 105 – Rutherford, Bradford	Western terminus
Gibson				Bridge over the South Fork of the Obion River	
Weakley				Big Cypress Road - Big Cypress Tree State Park	Access road into park
Weakley	Greenfield	12.6	20.3	US 45E (N Meridian Street/SR 43) – Sharon, Downtown, Bradford	Eastern terminus
1.000 mi = 1.609 km; 1.000 km = 0.621 mi
