= Tennessee State Route 124 =

State highway in Tennessee, United States

State Route 124
- SR 124 highlighted in red

Route information
- Maintained by TDOT
- Length: 19.19 mi (30.88 km)

Major junctions
- West end: US 45E / SR 54 in Greenfield
- SR 190 in Pillowville; US 79 in McKenzie
- East end: SR 22 in McKenzie

Location
- Country: United States
- State: Tennessee
- Counties: Weakley, Carroll

Highway system
- Tennessee State Routes; Interstate; US; State
← I-124	→ SR 125

State Route 124 (SR 124) is a 19.19-mile-long (30.88 km) east–west state highway in West Tennessee. It serves to connect the towns of Greenfield and McKenzie.

== Route description ==
SR 124 begins in Weakley County in Greenfield at an intersection with US 45E/SR 43/SR 54. It heads east along Main Street to pass through downtown and some neighborhoods before leaving Greenfield and continuing east through farmland. The highway then passes through the community of Pillowville, where it has an intersection with SR 190. SR 124 continues east through rural areas to enter McKenzie just shortly before crossing into Carroll County. It enters town on W Magnolia Avenue where it passes through neighborhoods before turning south and entering downtown along N Stonewall Street. The highway then merges onto Cedar Street and continues southeast through downtown before coming to an intersection with US 79/SR 76. SR 124 continues southeast through neighborhoods before coming to an end at an intersection with SR 22. The entire route of SR 124 is a two-lane highway.

== Major intersections ==
County	Location	mi	km	Destinations	Notes
Weakley	Greenfield	0.0	0.0	US 45E / SR 54 (Meridian Street/SR 43) – Bradford, Dresden, Sharon	Western terminus
Weakley	Pillowville			SR 190 – Gleason, Trezevant	
Carroll	McKenzie			US 79 (Highland Drive/SR 76) – Trezevant, Henry	
Carroll	McKenzie	19.19	30.88	SR 22 – Gleason, Huntingdon	Eastern terminus
1.000 mi = 1.609 km; 1.000 km = 0.621 mi
