= Tornado outbreak of April 2, 2006 =

Windstorm in the central United States

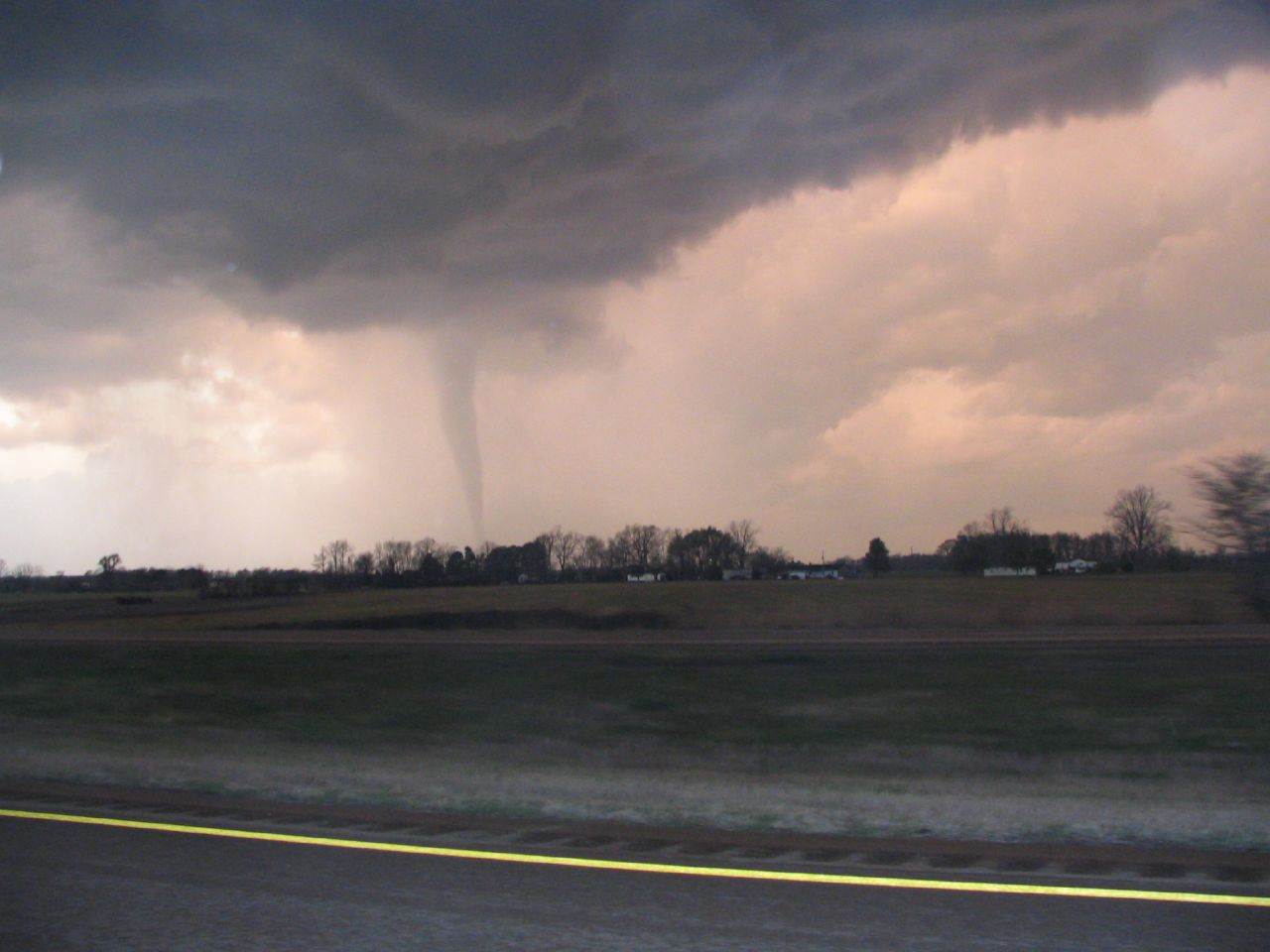
- The Wynne, AR F3 tornado shortly after touchdown

Meteorological history
- Duration: April 2, 2006

Tornado outbreak
- Tornadoes: 66 confirmed
- Max. rating: F3 tornado
- Duration: 6 hours, 43 minutes

Overall effects
- Casualties: 27 fatalities (+2 non-tornadic), 348 injuries
- Damage: $1.1 billion
- Areas affected: Midwestern United States, Mississippi River Valley
- Part of the Tornadoes of 2006

During the late afternoon and evening of April 2, 2006, a series of tornadoes broke out in the central United States. It was the second major outbreak of 2006, in the same area that suffered considerable destruction in a previous outbreak on March 11 and 12, as well as an outbreak on November 15, 2005. The most notable tornadoes of the outbreak struck northeastern Arkansas, the Missouri Bootheel, and West Tennessee, where several communities – including Marmaduke, Arkansas, Caruthersville, Missouri, and Newbern, Tennessee suffered devastating damage. In total, 66 tornadoes touched down across seven states, which is the most in a single day in 2006. In addition, there were over 850 total severe weather reports, including many reports of straight-line winds exceeding hurricane force and hail as large as softballs, which caused significant additional damage in a nine-state region.

The outbreak caused 27 tornado-related deaths and caused two other fatalities from straight-line winds. It was the deadliest tornado outbreak in the United States since the tornado outbreak sequence of May 2003, which killed 48 people. Twenty-six of those deaths were caused by a single supercell thunderstorm which produced damaging and long lived tornadoes from north central Arkansas into northwest Tennessee.

== Meteorological synopsis ==
The outbreak was caused by a cold front that tracked across the central United States, triggered by a deep low-pressure area in the Upper Midwest. The warm humid air mass ahead of the cold front, along with high upper-level wind shear, produced supercells across the region. A large trough was located in the Dakotas, and another low pressure system was located in Nebraska. A small high pressure upper-level ridge pushed between the two low pressure systems. Intense diffluence was present at the jet streak, forcing winds into Kentucky, and eastern winds into South Carolina. This enhanced vertical motion in the Tennessee Valley. Steep lapse rates were evident on the Mississippi River.

The outbreak was expected to have started the previous day in the High Plains as the cold front tracked across that region. The supercells didn't really fire up as expected and only one small tornado was reported in Pawnee County, Kansas on April 1. Severe weather that day was largely restricted to significant microbursts and large hail.

The Storm Prediction Center (SPC) issued a moderate risk of severe weather for April 2, with the main risks being tornadoes and large hail. The primary risk area was the central Mississippi Valley and lower Ohio Valley up to central Illinois, where most of the tornadoes touched down. Many tornado watches – if not any PDS watches – were issued across the region. While a significant severe weather event was expected, the extreme nature caught many forecasters by surprise, based on the risk levels and the probabilities estimated by the SPC in the area primarily affected.

Farther north, the initial thunderstorm development in eastern Missouri quickly developed into a squall line, eventually becoming a derecho that produced many embedded – and generally weak – tornadoes and widespread wind damage across Illinois, Indiana, Kentucky, and Ohio. Springfield, Illinois, which was struck by two tornadoes less than a month earlier, was hit again by tornadoes and damaging straight-line winds of up to 80 miles per hour (70 kn; 130 km/h), as was the St. Louis, Missouri area. Wind damage was reported in Cincinnati, Louisville, Kentucky, and Indianapolis, among other cities.

The line of storms slowly weakened while traveling eastward, and the severe weather events dissipated later that evening.

== Confirmed tornadoes ==
Confirmed tornadoes by Fujita rating
FU	F0	F1	F2	F3	F4	F5	Total
0	27	25	8	6	0	0	66

List of confirmed tornadoes – Sunday, April 2, 2006
F#	Location	County	Time (UTC)	Path length	Damage
Iowa
F0	SW of Bloomfield	Davis	2047	unknown	Brief touchdown over open fields with no damage.
F0	N of Pulaski	Davis	2057	unknown	Brief "pencil-thin" tornado remained over open fields with no damage.
F2	W of Pittsburg	Van Buren	2101	3 miles (5 km)	Two houses lost their roofs and four outbuildings were destroyed. Many trees and power lines were downed as well.
F1	N of Mount Zion	Van Buren	2109	2.5 miles (4 km)	A roof was blown off a barn with minor roof damage to a house. Several outbuildings were destroyed with tree damage noted.
F1	S of Fairfield	Jefferson	2118	unknown	Brief tornado touchdown destroyed an outbuilding.
F1	E of Stockport	Van Buren	2119	3 miles (5 km)	Several outbuildings were destroyed and numerous trees were knocked down.
F2	Washington	Washington	2147	1 mile (1.6 km)	Tornado struck the west side of town. A garage was completely unroofed and a shed was destroyed. Numerous trees were snapped along the path, and metal sheeting was torn off a business near the end of the path.
F1	S of Riverside	Washington	2200	unknown	Power lines were knocked down by this brief tornado.
F0	SW of Hartford	Warren	2206	unknown	Brief tornado remained over open fields with no damage.
F0	N of Runnells	Polk	2231	unknown	Brief tornado remained over open fields with no damage.
Missouri
F2	NE of Perry to SE of Hatch	Ralls	2125	3.2 miles (5 km)	Near Clarence Cannon Dam, a convenience store sustained minor damage, a pole barn was destroyed and scattered, and two boats were flipped over. An RV dealership was badly damaged, sustaining collapse of its service bay, and with only one wall left standing on the second floor. At least 30 campers sustained some type of damage, and 8 to 10 of them were completely destroyed. Some of the camper frames were found 150 to 200 feet north of their initial positions, and debris from this area was scattered over 1/4 mile away. Three 1x3 inch boards were found stuck in the dealerships hard packed gravel lot. Further along the path, a pole barn was damaged, many trees were snapped, and a metal sign was stuck 4–6 inches into a tilled field.
F0	Park Hills	St. Francois	2200	150 yd (130 m)	Caused minor damage to the roofs of three houses and an auto business. Numerous tree limbs were also snapped.
F0	SW of Weingarten	Ste. Genevieve	2205	2 miles (3.2 km)	Three farms sustained minor home and machine shed damage, while several trees were snapped or uprooted.
F0	N of Sikeston	Scott	2343	2 miles (3.2 km)	Several buildings on a farm sustained minor damage, along with the roof of a house.
Arkansas
F1	SW of Williford to E of Ravenden	Sharp, Lawrence	2159	10 miles (16 km)	In Sharp County, a barn and a workshop were damaged, and many trees were snapped or uprooted. In Lawrence County, up to 40 homes were damaged. In the town of Ravenden, a barn, a rental house, and 4 unoccupied buildings were damaged.
F3	S of Pocahontas, AR to Caruthersville, MO	Randolph (AR), Greene (AR), Dunklin (MO), Pemiscot (MO)	2237	77 miles (124 km)	2 deaths – See section on this tornado.
F2	SE of Armstrong Springs to N of Searcy	White	2235	6.3 miles (10 km)	Tornado destroyed two mobile homes, and several other mobile homes were damaged. A self-storage warehouse was damaged as were three other businesses. Several dozen trees were uprooted, and power lines were downed. A number of vehicles were badly damaged as well.
F3	SE of Morton to W of Crawfordsville	Woodruff, Cross, Crittenden	2352	22 miles (35 km)	In Woodruff County, the tornado was at F0 intensity, with limited to trees and power lines. In Cross County, the tornado reached F3 intensity and struck the small community of Fitzgerald Crossing, where 10 homes were destroyed or had major damage, with 27 homes and 5 mobile homes receiving minor damage. Village Creek State Park sustained damage to its visitor center and tennis court. Two buildings sustained minor damage in Crittenden County, before the tornado dissipated. Many trees were snapped and uprooted along the path, and 5 people were injured.
Illinois
F1	S of Blandinsville	McDonough	2214	12 miles (20 km)	A maintenance garage, two wooden barns, a metal pole barn, and 7 grain bins were destroyed. 4 grain bins were damaged, and extensive tree damage occurred as well.
F0	NE of Piasa	Macoupin	2215	2 miles (3.2 km)	A mobile home was destroyed, and a grain bin and some farm buildings were damaged.
F0	Piasa	Macoupin	2215	0.5 mile (800 m)	Numerous homes in town sustained roof and siding damage, and extensive tree and power line damage occurred. A barn was destroyed, a parking canopy collapsed, and a car was pushed off of a road.
F2	Fairview Heights/O'Fallon areas	St. Clair	2215	unknown	1 death – A clothing store sustained collapse of its roof, and a church sustained roof and steeple damage. Numerous homes were damaged, some heavily. One home had its roof torn off and thrown 100 yards. Many trees and power lines were downed as well, and 11 people were injured.
F0	N of Terre Haute	Henderson	2218	unknown	Brief touchdown caused no damage.
F0	S of Dorsey to SW of Staunton	Madison, Macoupin	2220	16 miles (26 km)	Near Dorsey, trees were damaged and roof shingles were blown off of a couple of homes. Damage to trees, power lines, and shingles occurred near Staunton as well.
F1	SW of Highland	Madison	2230	2 miles (3.2 km)	A garage and a machine shed were destroyed, and homes sustained roof, window, and siding damage. Power poles were snapped as well.
F0	N of Gillespie	Macoupin	2235	100 yd (90 m)	One mobile home was destroyed.
F0	N of Walshville	Montgomery	2241	1 mile (1.6 km)	Damaged limited to a single farm, where a house suffered minor roof damage and a shed was destroyed. Some trees were downed as well.
F1	SW of Loami	Sangamon	2246	0.5 mile (800 m)	Several large trees and some power lines were downed.
F1	NE of Berlin	Sangamon	2249	2 miles (3.2 km)	A grain bin and a pole barn were destroyed, and another pole barn was damaged. Trees were snapped as well.
F2	Hillsboro to E of Nokomis	Montgomery	2250	20 miles (32 km)	In Hillsboro, two gas stations and a car dealership sustained window and sign damage. Metal sheeting was blown into trees as well. East of town, several barns were destroyed, with debris scattered up to a mile away. Grain bins and machine sheds were also heavily damaged, and two high-tension truss towers were toppled.
F1	N of Chatham	Sangamon	2256	1 mile (1.6 km)	Several homes sustained roof damage.
F1	E of Farmersville to NW of Morrisonville	Montgomery, Christian	2256	3 miles (5 km)	Several outbuildings, grain bins, and barns were heavily damaged at three farms.
F1	Springfield (1st tornado)	Sangamon	2258	1 mile (1.6 km)	Damage reported in the same area hit on March 12, with minor roof and structural damage to several businesses.
F0	SW of Pawnee	Sangamon	2259	1.3 miles (2 km)	Three grain bins were overturned and destroyed, and three barns were also damaged. Trees were downed as well.
F1	Springfield (2nd tornado)	Sangamon	2306	0.75 mile (1.2 mile)	Fourth and final tornado to strike Springfield in 2006. The Illinois Department of Transportation building sustained roof damage.
F1	Taylorville	Christian	2308	6.3 miles (10 km)	Multiple homes and businesses in town sustained roof and structural damage. Sheds were damaged and numerous trees were downed as well. One person was injured.
F1	S of Riverton	Sangamon	2313	1.5 miles (2.4 mile)	Tornado struck a mobile home park, destroying 8 homes and damaging 30 others. Numerous trees were blown down and one person was injured.
F1	N of Oconee to Pana	Shelby, Christian	2315	6 miles (9.5 km)	A shed had its roof torn off and another shed was blown across a field. In Pana, many trees were downed and homes sustained roof damage.
F0	NE of Taylorville	Christian	2317	unknown	Brief touchdown in an open field with no damage.
F1	Assumption	Christian	2320	1 miles (1.6 km)	Minor roof and tree damage occurred in town.
F0	Greenview	Menard	2322	0.25 mile (400 m)	A house sustained minor siding damage.
F0	E of Niantic	Macon	2330	0.1 mile (150 m)	Brief touchdown in an open field with no damage.
F2	SW of Macon	Macon	2330	4.5 miles (7.5 km)	One large barn was destroyed with debris scattered up to a mile away. A house sustained minor roof damage as well.
F0	SE of Lincoln	Logan	2332	1 miles (1.6 km)	Tornado damaged a barn, blew down a large tree, and damaged a grain storage bin.
F0	NW of Chestnut	Logan	2336	2.5 miles (4 km)	Tornado caused roof damage to several barns, blew down a few trees, and damaged shingles on homes.
F1	SW of Elwin to S of Decatur	Macon	2336	7.5 miles (11.5 km)	Tornado snapped power poles and blew down numerous trees along its path. It damaged the roof of several structures and broke a window and some signs at a strip mall. Three people were injured by flying glass.
F0	Neoga	Cumberland	2342	0.75 mile (1.2 km)	The roof was damaged at a local school, plus several trees were knocked down.
F0	N of Weldon	De Witt	0001	0.1 mile (150 m)	Tornado remained in open fields with no damage.
F0	S of Towanda	McLean	0008	0.1 mile (150 m)	Tornado remained in open fields with no damage.
F0	S of Arrowsmith	McLean, Woodford	0012	0.5 mile (800 m)	A barn was destroyed, and another barn had its metal roof torn off. Three concrete grain silos were destroyed as well.
F0	Champaign area	Champaign	0015	0.1 mile (150 m)	Brief touchdown with no damage.
F0	SW of Saybrook	McLean, Livingston	0022	2.25 miles (3.5 km)	Tornado remained over open fields with no damage.
F0	Flatville	Champaign	0025	0.25 mile (400 m)	Minor structural damage occurred in town.
Tennessee
F3	N of Lenox to E of Newbern	Dyer, Gibson	0030	18 miles (29 km)	16 deaths – This devastating tornado affected rural areas before it struck the north edge of Newbern, where major damage occurred. 71 homes were destroyed and 182 others were damaged. Some frail homes were swept completely away. 70 people were injured.
F3	W of Dyer to S of McKenzie	Gibson, Weakley, Carroll	0109	31 miles (50 km)	6 deaths – Tornado touched down and caused some damage in Dyer before rapidly intensifying and striking Bradford. Bradford was severely damaged, with 75 homes destroyed and 250 others damaged. The police station was destroyed, and several businesses were heavily damaged. The tornado then passed near Pillowville, with 4 homes destroyed and 38 others damaged in that area. Two barns were destroyed as well. South of McKenzie, 34 homes, two apartments, one shop building, and 9 farm buildings were damaged. A church and some grain bins were also destroyed before the tornado dissipated. 44 people were injured, and many trees and power lines were downed along the path. All fatalities occurred in Bradford.
F3	N of Rutherford	Gibson	0125	10 miles (16 km)	2 deaths – 6 homes were destroyed and 250 others were damaged. Vehicles were picked up and thrown into fields. 6 people were injured.
F1	Longtown area	Fayette	0245	1 mile (1.6 km)	Ten homes and two businesses were damaged, along with many barns and outbuildings. Numerous trees and power lines were downed and two people were injured.
F1	SW of Camden	Benton	0255	unknown	A trucking company was completely destroyed, with debris scattered up to 2 miles away.
F2	W of Brownsville	Haywood	0325	0.75 mile (1.2 km)	Considerable damage occurred in the Hickory Mills subdivision. 24 homes sustained roof damage, and one was destroyed. Another home was moved off of its foundation.
Kentucky
F0	E of Gage	McCracken	0031	unknown	Tornado remained over open country with no damage.
F3	N of Hopkinsville	Christian, Todd	0150	30 miles (48 km)	Large wedge tornado. In Christian County, 91 homes were destroyed and 171 others were damaged. Numerous garages, barns, and outbuildings were destroyed, and some vehicles were damaged or destroyed as well. Hundreds of trees were downed, snapped, or uprooted, and several metal high-tension towers were toppled, cutting off power to Hopkinsville for 6 hours. In Todd County, 2 homes were destroyed and 28 others were damaged. Close to two dozen sheds and barns were damaged or destroyed, along with at least one grain bin. Numerous trees were uprooted, and some farm machinery and vehicles were damaged or destroyed, including tractors and combines. A church had its roof torn off and its windows blown out in Cedar Grove before the tornado dissipated. Gas leaks were reported in the area, and 28 people were injured.
F1	N of Shelbyville	Shelby	0215	2 miles (3.2 km)	Anticyclonic tornado damaged trees and power lines.
F1	SE of Edwards	Logan	0330	2 miles (3.2 km)	Unknown minor damage occurred.
Indiana
F1	Mitchell	Lawrence	0105	unknown	A few homes and businesses were damaged in town.
F1	SE of Romney	Tippecanoe	0110	unknown	Minor damage occurred, mostly to outbuildings.
F1	Seymour	Jackson	0145	unknown	Minor to moderate damage to several houses in town. Numerous trees and power lines also knocked down.
Sources: SPC Storm Reports for 04/02, Little Rock office, Quad Cities office, Memphis office, Paducah office, Lincoln office, Nashville office, Indianapolis office, Louisville office, National Climatic Data Center

=== Marmaduke, Arkansas/Caruthersville, Missouri ===
Marmaduke, Arkansas/Caruthersville, Missouri
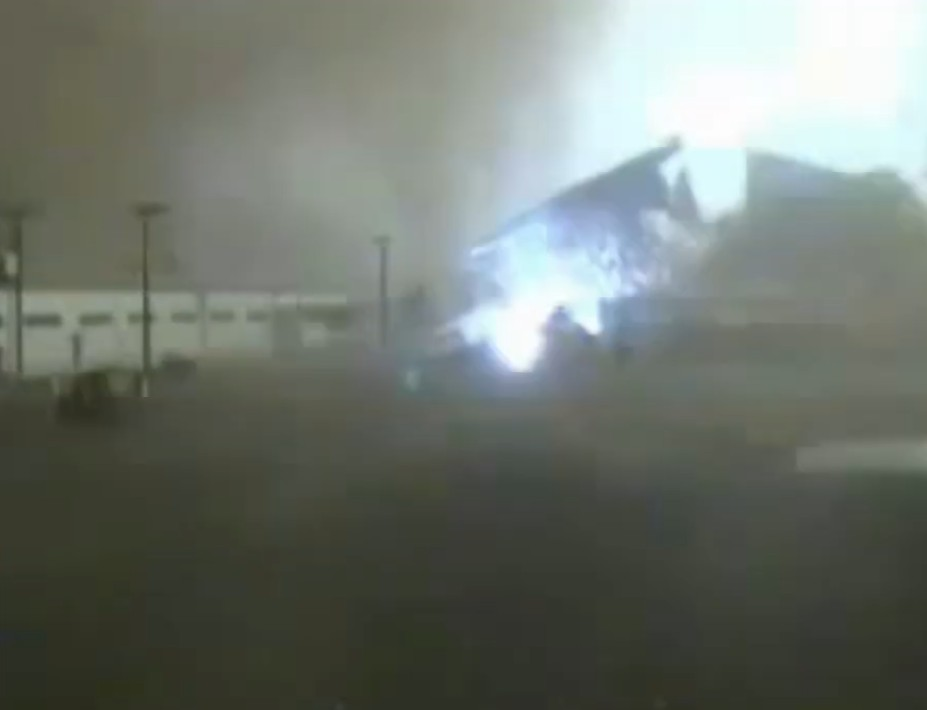
- A security camera still of the tornado as it struck Caruthersville, Missouri

F3 tornado
- on the Fujita scale

Overall effects
- Casualties: 2 fatalities, 177 injuries
- Damage: $86.5 million (2006 USD)

The most infamous tornado of the outbreak touched down in Randolph County, Arkansas just south of Pocahontas. The tornado first struck the small community of Shannon at F1 intensity. 3 businesses and 5 homes were destroyed. Another two businesses and two homes had major damage, and 18 other homes had minor damage. Past Shannon, the tornado rapidly intensified into a large high-end F3 as it crossed into Greene County and slammed into the town of Marmaduke. The town was devastated, with 130 homes and 25 mobile homes being destroyed. A pharmacy and some industrial buildings were also destroyed, and the town's water tower was damaged. Multiple vehicles were tossed around, and 15 railroad cars were blown off of the tracks as well. 47 people were injured in town, two of which were airlifted to a hospital. Outside of town, 19 homes and 11 mobile homes were destroyed. In addition, seven houses and two mobile homes had major damage in the county. A car was thrown 80 yards from one residence well.

The tornado then crossed the St. Francis River into Dunklin County, Missouri, where it displayed a multiple-vortex structure. 7 homes were destroyed and 33 others were damaged in rural portions of the county. Multiple power poles were downed as well. The tornado then crossed into Pemiscot County, and struck the town of Braggadocio at F2 intensity. The tornado's only two fatalities occurred at that location when a couple was killed in their car as they tried to flee from the tornado. The tornado then re-intensified to a high-end F3 as it tore through the neighboring town of Caruthersville, destroying roughly half of the community and injuring 130 people. 226 homes were destroyed, and 542 others were damaged in town. The town's water tower, municipal airport, several churches, Caruthersville High School and Middle School, and multiple businesses were destroyed as well. The tornado abruptly dissipated just outside town after traveling 77 miles.

==== Aftermath ====
Six months after the tornado, debris remained scattered throughout Marmaduke. Many homes and businesses had been rebuilt; while many others remained in their tornado-damaged state. The Marmaduke water tower, which was heavily damaged, was torn down shortly after the tornado. The primary employer in the area, American Railcar Industries, rebuilt its facility and quickly returned it to operational status.

On August 29, 2006, Caruthersville Emergency Manager and Fire Chief Charlie Jones was awarded the StormReady Community Hero Award for his actions preventing further injuries and fatalities in the area. He ordered the sirens to sound repeatedly and used the fire department's communications frequency to warn of the imminent and extreme danger that lay ahead, which saved many lives that evening. There were no deaths in Caruthersville as a result. More than half the community was destroyed. Charitable outpouring was enormous and several key buildings, including one of the schools, have been rebuilt.

Numerous FEMA trailers – intended for Hurricane Katrina victims but unused and sitting nearby – were redirected to the communities affected in Arkansas, Missouri, and Tennessee after the tornadoes hit.

=== Dyer County, Tennessee ===
Dyer County, Tennessee
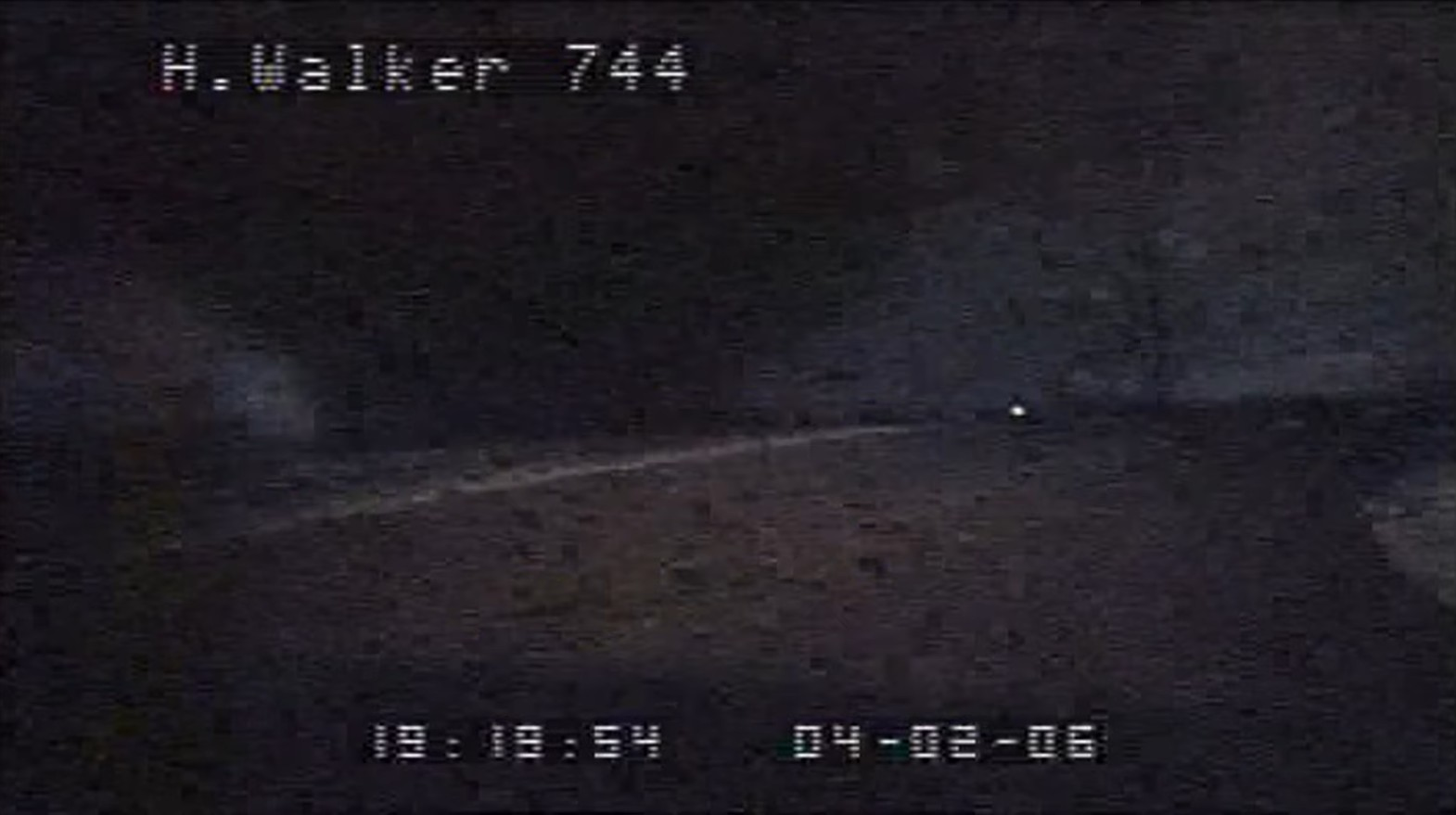
- A police dashboard camera still showing the tornado tracking through rural Dyer County

F3 tornado
- on the Fujita scale

Overall effects
- Casualties: 16 fatalities, 70 injuries
- Damage: $20 million (2006 USD)

The tornado touched down at 6:32 P.M. CDT, in Dyer County, Tennessee. The first portion of the tornado's life was mainly rural. Continuing eastward, the tornado crossed the Obion River. The tornado crossed Harness Road before shortly crossing Willie Johnson Road. The tornado later impacted Charlie Ennis Road. The tornado moved north of a creek before crossing north of Newbern. The tornado dissipated near Grills Road at 6:55 P.M. CDT.

== Damage images ==
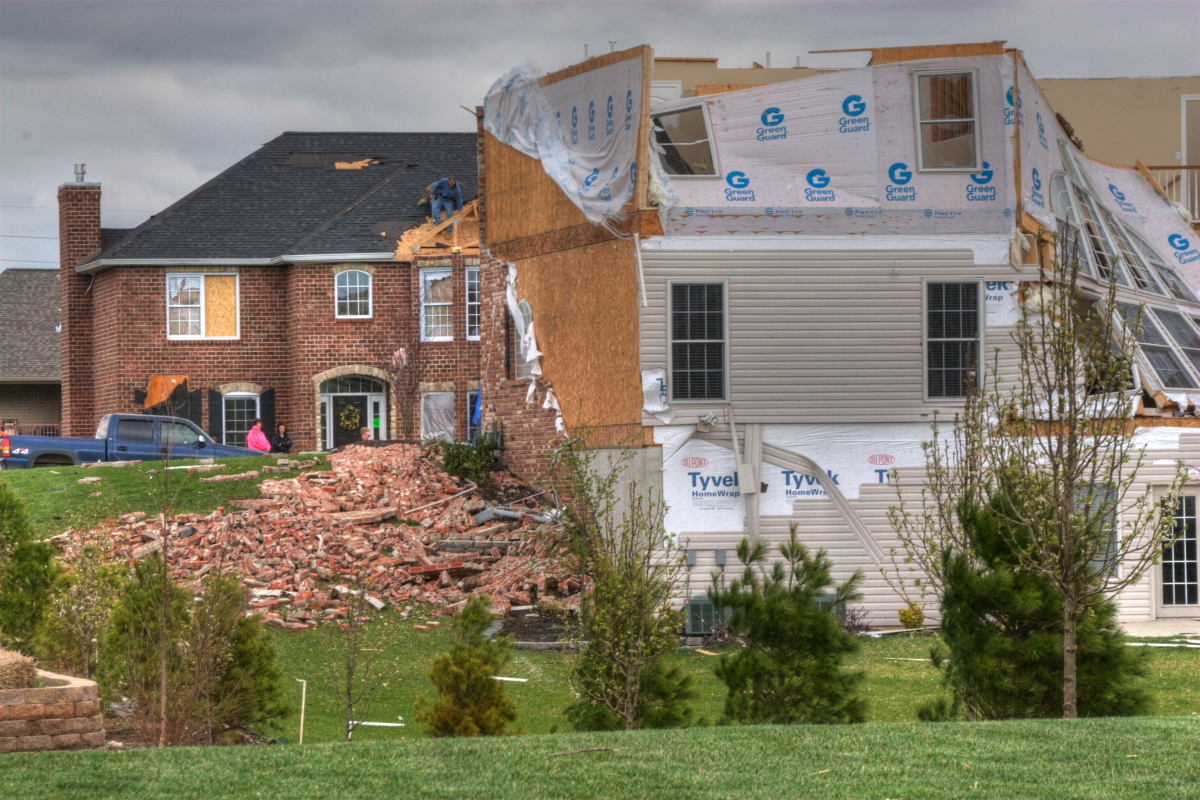
Tornado damage
O'Fallon, Illinois
April 2, 2006

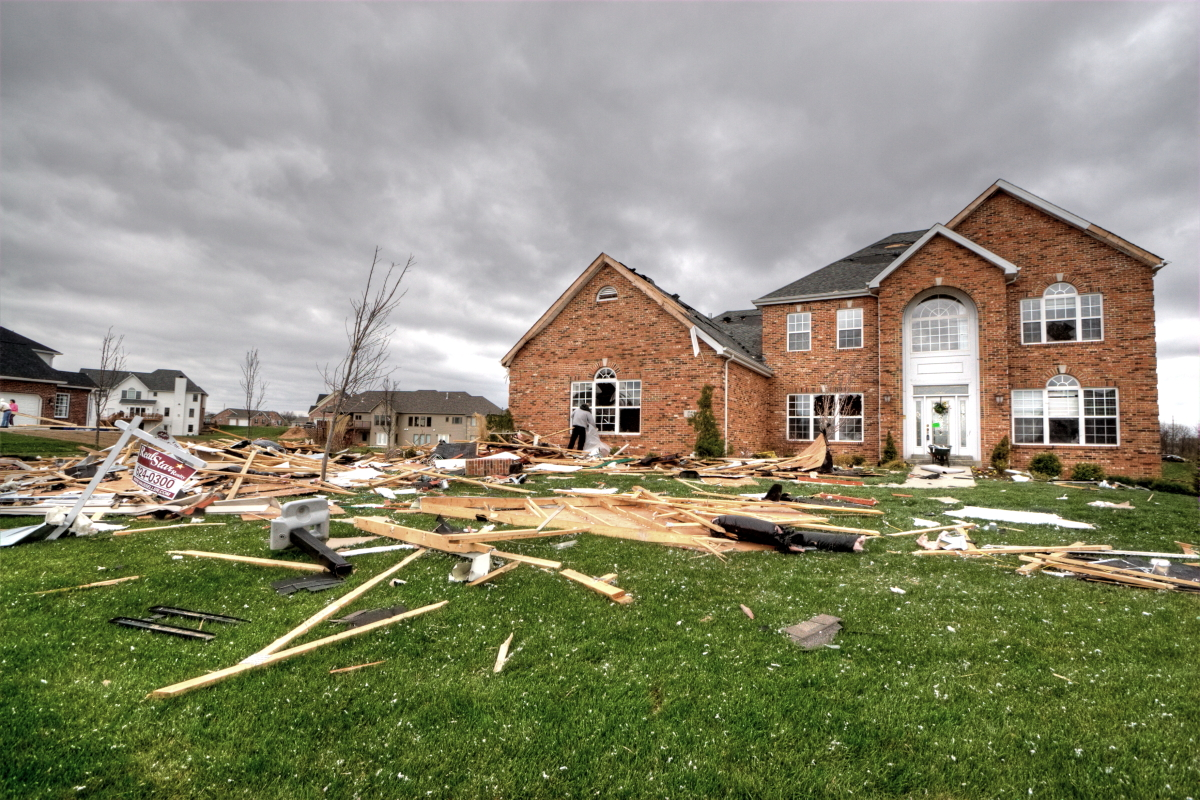
Tornado damage
O'Fallon, Illinois
April 2, 2006

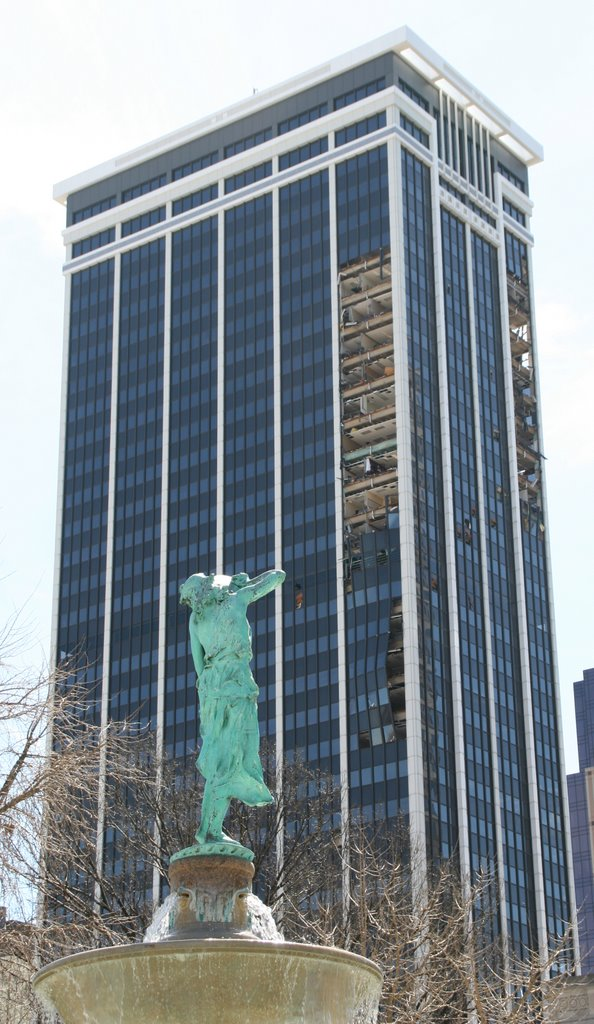
Derecho damage
Indianapolis, Indiana
April 2, 2006

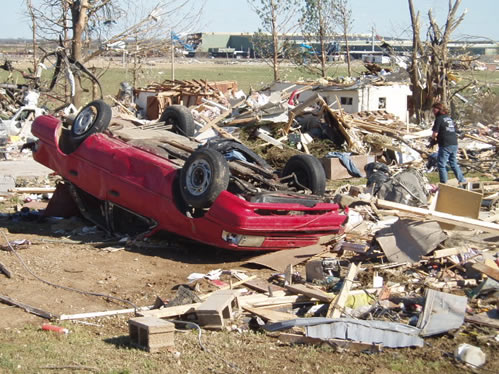
Tornado damage
Marmaduke, Arkansas
April 2, 2006

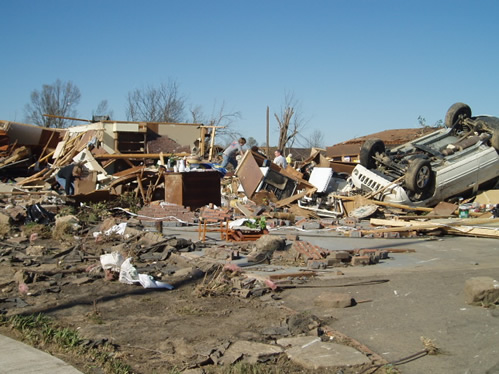
Tornado damage
Marmaduke, Arkansas
April 2, 2006

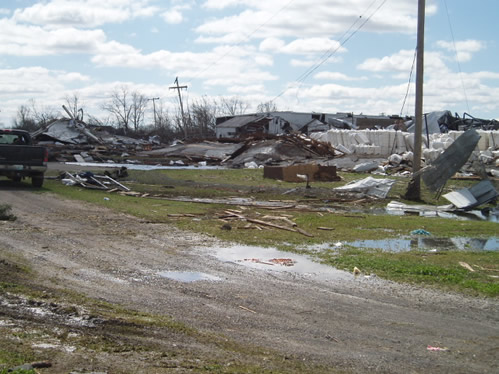
Tornado damage
Caruthersville, Missouri
April 2, 2006

== See also ==
- List of North American tornadoes and tornado outbreaks
- Tornadoes of 2006
