= Bradford High School =

Bradford High School may refer to:

- Bradford High School (Arkansas), Bradford, Arkansas
- Bradford High School (Florida), Starke, Florida
- Bradford High School (Ohio), Bradford, Ohio
- Bradford High School (Tennessee), Bradford, Tennessee
- Bradford Area High School, Bradford, Pennsylvania
- Bradford Union Vocational Technical Center, Starke, Florida
- Mary D. Bradford High School, Kenosha, Wisconsin
- Northeast Bradford Junior/Senior High School, Rome, Pennsylvania
