= Austin Springs, Weakley County, Tennessee =

Unincorporated community in Tennessee, US

Coordinates: 36°29′30″N 88°38′04″W

Austin Springs is an unincorporated community in Weakley County, Tennessee, United States.

== History ==
The community was named for the Austin brothers who started a hotel at the site of a mineral spa.
