= Gibson County High School =

High school in Tennessee, United States

Coordinates: 36.0241°N 88.9666°W

Location
- 130 Trenton Highway; Dyer, (Gibson County), Tennessee 38330; United States

Information
- Type: Public high school
- Principal: Jim Hughes
- Staff: 30.75 (FTE)
- Enrollment: 429 (2023-2024)
- Student to teacher ratio: 13.95
- Colors: Red; White; Columbia Blue
- Nickname: Pioneers

Gibson County High School is a public high school located in Gibson County, Tennessee, with a Dyer postal address.

It is a part of the Gibson County School District. The attendance boundary for this school includes Dyer, Spring Hill, Rutherford, Yorkville, and the Gibson County portion of Kenton.

== Student body ==
The school serves students in ninth through twelfth grade. During the 2018–2019 school year, Gibson County High School had a total enrollment of 477 students and a student–teacher ratio of 13.87.

== History ==
In 1980, computer terminals and a computer for assisted instruction called STRIDE were installed at the school. Students used STRIDE to learn math, reading, and language arts. STRIDE could store information about the problems the students completed, automatically give new assignments, offer students encouragement, and give teacher information about what students are having issues with. This was done as part of a Title 1 program.

In 2010, the school's girls' basketball team won the TSSAA Class AA Girls' Basketball State Tournament held at Middle Tennessee State University. The team was honored and congratulated with a joint resolution in the Tennessee General Assembly.

In 2011, a female teacher at the school was indicted on statutory rape of a male student.

In 2011, solar panels were installed at the school by the Tennessee Valley Authority. The site can generate 24,000 kilowatt hours annually.
