= Big Cypress Tree State Park =

State park in Tennessee, United States

- Interactive map of Big Cypress Tree State Park
- Type: Tennessee State Park
- Location: Greenfield, Tennessee, United States
- Coordinates: 36°11′37″N 88°53′24″W
- Operator: TDEC
- Website: Big Cypress Tree State Park

Big Cypress Tree State Park is a state park in Weakley County, Tennessee, located in the Southeastern United States. The park is named after a large and old bald cypress tree that once stood on the park's grounds. The tree was approximately 1,350 years old when it was killed by lightning in 1976.

The park consists of a 330-acre (1.3 km²) natural area situated amidst the watershed of the Obion River.
