= Boydsville, Kentucky and Tennessee =

Unincorporated community in Kentucky and Tennessee, US

Coordinates: 36.5020°N 88.5234°W

Boydsville is an unincorporated community in Graves County, Kentucky, and Weakley County, Tennessee, in the United States.

== History ==
A post office called Boydsville was established on the Tennessee side in 1837, and remained in operation until it was discontinued in 1853. Abner Boyd, the first postmaster, gave the community its name.
