= Dyer, Tennessee =

- City
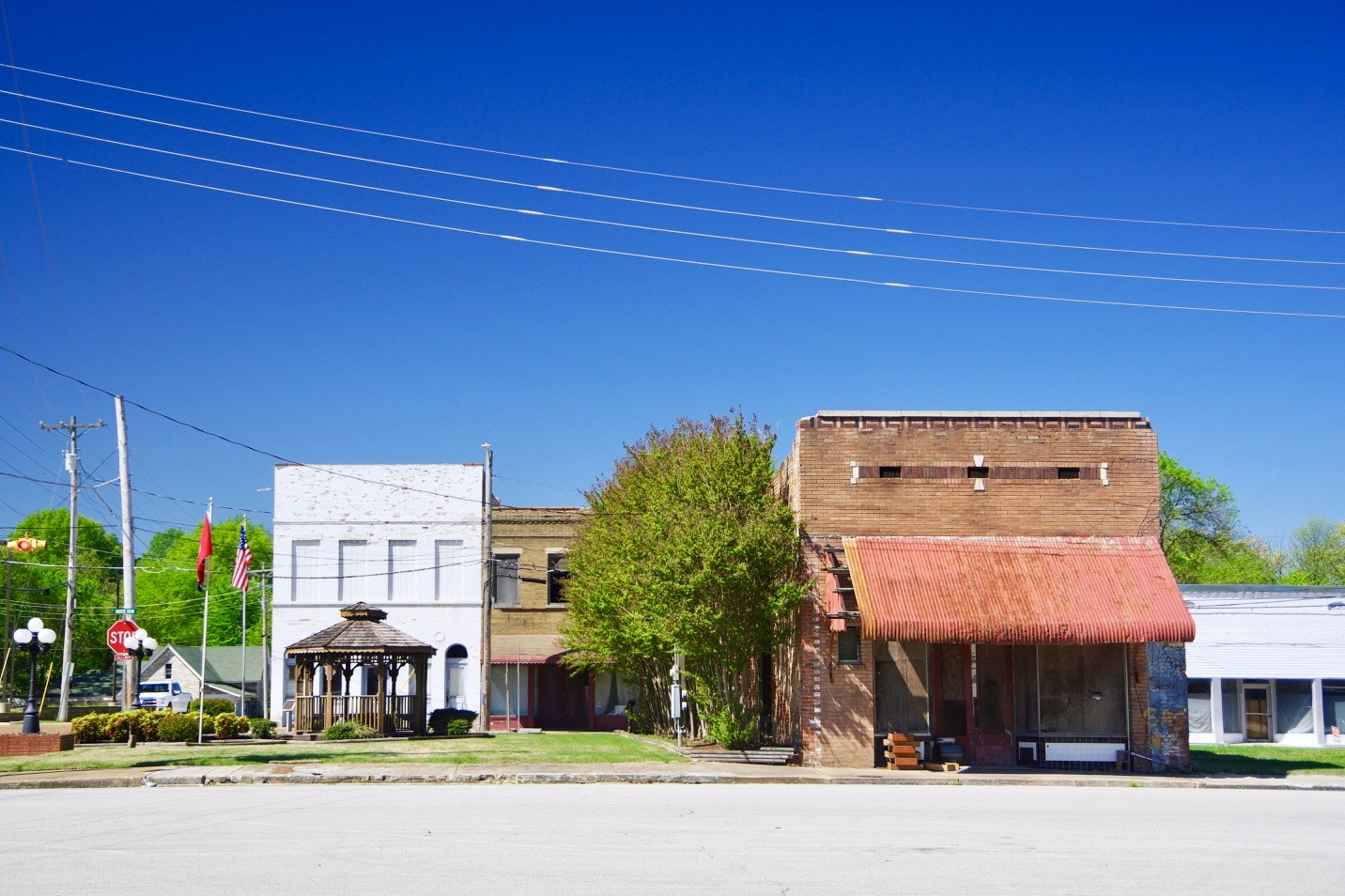
- Dyer, from Front Street

- Location of Dyer in Gibson County, Tennessee.
- Coordinates: 36°4′9″N 88°59′30″W
- Country: United States
- State: Tennessee
- County: Gibson
- Chartered: 1899

Government
  - Mayor: Chris Younger

Area
  - Total: 2.86 sq mi (7.41 km^{2})
  - Land: 2.86 sq mi (7.41 km^{2})
  - Water: 0 sq mi (0.00 km^{2})
- Elevation: 367 ft (112 m)

Population (2020)
  - Total: 2,308
  - Density: 806.2/sq mi (311.29/km^{2})
- Time zone: UTC-6 (Central (CST))
  - Summer (DST): UTC-5 (CDT)
- ZIP code: 38330
- Area code: 731
- FIPS code: 47-22180
- GNIS feature ID: 1283253
- Website: www.cityofdyertn.com

Dyer is a city in Gibson County, Tennessee, United States. As of the 2020 census, Dyer had a population of 2,308. Dyer was originally known as Dyer Station, a name given by railroad workers in the early days of rail.

== Geography ==
Dyer is located at 36°4′9″N 88°59′30″W (36.069267, -88.991620).

According to the United States Census Bureau, the city has a total area of 2.3 square miles (6.0 km^{2}), all land.

Historical population
Census	Pop.	Note	%±
1880	401		—
1890	606		51.1%
1900	1,204		98.7%
1910	1,166		−3.2%
1920	1,250		7.2%
1930	1,214		−2.9%
1940	1,185		−2.4%
1950	1,864		57.3%
1960	1,909		2.4%
1970	2,501		31.0%
1980	2,442		−2.4%
1990	2,204		−9.7%
2000	2,406		9.2%
2010	2,341		−2.7%
2020	2,308		−1.4%

== Demographics ==
=== 2020 census ===
As of the 2020 census, Dyer had a population of 2,308. The median age was 39.4 years. 25.5% of residents were under the age of 18 and 21.3% of residents were 65 years of age or older. For every 100 females there were 85.4 males, and for every 100 females age 18 and over there were 76.1 males age 18 and over.

0.0% of residents lived in urban areas, while 100.0% lived in rural areas.

There were 879 households in Dyer, of which 35.5% had children under the age of 18 living in them. Of all households, 41.0% were married-couple households, 14.9% were households with a male householder and no spouse or partner present, and 38.0% were households with a female householder and no spouse or partner present. About 26.0% of all households were made up of individuals and 14.7% had someone living alone who was 65 years of age or older.

There were 993 housing units, of which 11.5% were vacant. The homeowner vacancy rate was 2.8% and the rental vacancy rate was 10.0%.

Racial composition as of the 2020 census
Race	Number	Percent
White	1,757	76.1%
Black or African American	434	18.8%
American Indian and Alaska Native	7	0.3%
Asian	4	0.2%
Native Hawaiian and Other Pacific Islander	2	0.1%
Some other race	14	0.6%
Two or more races	90	3.9%
Hispanic or Latino (of any race)	43	1.9%

=== 2000 census ===
As of the 2000 census, there was a population of 2,406, with 979 households and 776 families residing in the city. The population density was 1,064.3 inhabitants per square mile (410.9/km^{2}). There were 1,053 housing units at an average density of 465.8 per square mile (179.8/km^{2}). The racial makeup of the city was 50.34% White, 18.54% African American, 0.08% Native American, 0.04% Asian, 0.04% Pacific Islander, 0.29% from other races, and 0.67% from two or more races. Hispanic or Latino of any race were 0.54% of the population.

There were 979 households, out of which 27.3% had children under the age of 18 living with them, 51.0% were married couples living together, 14.9% had a female householder with no husband present, and 31.2% were non-families. 28.6% of all households were made up of individuals, and 16.8% had someone living alone who was 65 years of age or older. The average household size was 2.34 and the average family size was 2.87.

In the city, the population was spread out, with 22.0% under the age of 18, 8.1% from 18 to 24, 23.5% from 25 to 44, 22.6% from 45 to 64, and 23.8% who were 65 years of age or older. The median age was 42 years. For every 100 females, there were 76.3 males. For every 100 females age 18 and over, there were 73.8 males.

The median income for a household in the city was $28,250, and the median income for a family was $35,667. Males had a median income of $27,539 versus $19,306 for females. The per capita income for the city was $14,587. About 11.0% of families and 14.7% of the population were below the poverty line, including 23.8% of those under age 18 and 11.7% of those age 65 or over.

== Events ==
The annual Dyer Station Celebration is held during the week of the Fourth of July each year. The celebration was started with the hard work of Johnny McIlwain to honor the memory of his aunt, Mrs. Georgia Ellis, Dyer's first female alderman. Events include fireworks, singings, carnival, card tournaments, pet show, parade, street dance, talent show, etc. There is something to do each day and night during the week-long celebration.

== Education ==
Gibson County Special School District is the area school district.

It operates Dyer's K-8 public schools, including Dyer Junior High School and Dyer Elementary School. Their mascot is an eagle. High school students from Dyer generally attend the consolidated Gibson County High School, located just south of Dyer. Prior to consolidation in 1980, Dyer High School served the community.

== Media ==
=== Radio stations ===
- WCMT-FM 101.3 "The Freshest Hits The Hottest Hits"
- WWGY 99.3 "Today's Best Music with Ace & TJ in the Morning"
- WENK-AM 1240 "The Greatest Hits of All Time"
- WTPR-AM 710 "The Greatest Hits of All Time"
- WTKB 93.7 "Victory 93.7"

=== Newspaper ===
- Tri-City Reporter, a weekly publication covering the towns of Dyer, Rutherford, Kenton, and Yorkville. The Tri-City Reporter's offices are located in Trenton, Tennessee.

== Tornado of April 2, 2006 ==
Dyer was hit directly by an F3 tornado on April 2, 2006, which devastated the town and left 15 people dead. Early estimates were that over 1,500 homes were destroyed in Dyer and other areas of Gibson County. Of the 15 people who died, five were in the nearby town of Bradford, including a family of four. Two died just east of Rutherford. The remaining deaths were in Dyer County, about 15 miles west of Dyer.

== See also ==
- List of cities in Tennessee
