= Bradford High School (Tennessee) =

Location
- 136 Highway 45 South; Bradford, Tennessee; 38316; United States
- Coordinates: 36.0755°N 88.8140°W

Information
- Type: Public
- School district: Bradford Special School District
- NCES School ID: 470139000425
- Director: Dan Black
- Principal: Laura Brimm
- Teaching staff: 20.08 (FTE)
- Grades: 6–12
- Enrollment: 317 (2023–2024)
- Student to teacher ratio: 15.79
- Colors: Red and white
- Athletics conference: TSSAA
- Mascot: Red Devils
- Website: BHS

Bradford High School is a high school located in the town of Bradford in Gibson County, Tennessee, United States. It is a part of the Bradford Special School District and enrolls children in grades 6–12.

== Athletics ==
Bradford High School offers baseball, boys' and girls' basketball, cross country, golf, track and field, and wrestling. Their athletic teams are known as the Red Devils and Lady Red Devils. The school competes in TSSAA's Division I Class 1A.

=== Team State Titles ===
- 1982 Class A Girls' Basketball Champions
- 1991 Class A Girls' Basketball Runner-up
- 1993 Class A Girls' Basketball Champions
- 1995 Class A Girls' Basketball Runner-up
- 1996 Class A Girls' Basketball Champions
- 1997 Class A Girls' Basketball Champions
- 1998 Class A Girls' Basketball Champions
- 2000 Class A Girls' Basketball Champions

=== Individual State Titles ===
- 2010 Class A-AA Girls' Cross Country Runner-up - Jackilann Street
