= Latham, Tennessee =

- Unincorporated community
- Location within Tennessee Location within the United States
- Coordinates: 36°25′24″N 88°42′51″W
- Country: United States
- State: Tennessee
- County: Weakley
- Elevation: 354 ft (108 m)
- Time zone: UTC-6 (Central (CST))
  - Summer (DST): UTC-5 (CDT)
- Area code: 731
- GNIS feature ID: 1290667

Latham is an unincorporated community in Weakley County, Tennessee, United States.
