= Palmersville, Tennessee =

Palmersville
- Unincorporated community
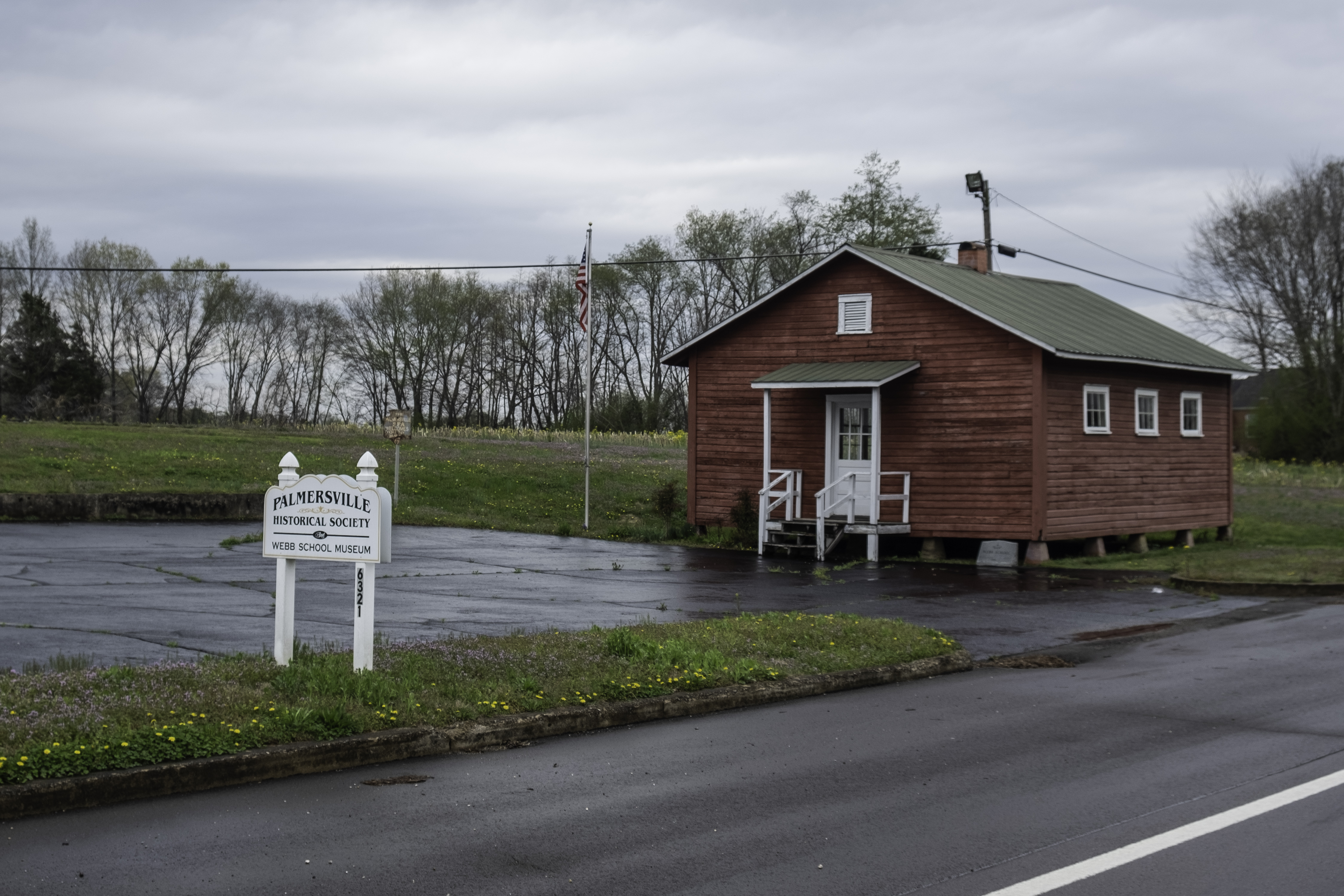
- The Palmersville Historical Society

- Location within the state of Tennessee Palmersville (the United States)
- Coordinates: 36°24′12″N 88°35′14″W
- Country: United States
- State: Tennessee
- County: Weakley

Area
  - Total: 2.88 sq mi (7.45 km^{2})
  - Land: 2.88 sq mi (7.45 km^{2})
  - Water: 0 sq mi (0.00 km^{2})
- Elevation: 449 ft (137 m)

Population (2020)
  - Total: 162
  - Density: 56.3/sq mi (21.74/km^{2})
- Time zone: UTC-6 (Central (CST))
  - Summer (DST): UTC-5 (CDT)
- ZIP codes: 38241
- GNIS feature ID: 1283116

Palmersville is a small unincorporated community in northeastern Weakley County, Tennessee, United States. It has a post office, with ZIP code 38241. The United States Census Bureau does not maintain demographic data for Palmersville. Palmersville is located at the intersection of state routes 89 and 190.

Palmersville is within the 8th Congressional district, represented in the U.S. House by Republican David Kustoff.

== Demographics ==
The United States Census Bureau does not maintain demographic data for Palmersville.

Historical population
Census	Pop.	Note	%±
2020	162		—
U.S. Decennial Census

== History ==
Palmersville was one of the first settlements in Weakley County. It is named for one of its founders, W. R. Palmer. Minida College was built in Palmersville during the late 1800s. In 1924, the town was devastated by a fire which destroyed all but four buildings leaving only the local bank, the blacksmith shop, and two stores unscathed.

== Notable people ==
- Pauline LaFon Gore, mother of former Vice President Al Gore and wife of former senator for Tennessee Albert Gore Sr.
- Ned McWherter, former Governor of Tennessee

== Media ==
- WWGY 99.3 "Today's Best Music with "Ace & TJ in the Morning"
- WRQR-FM 105.5 "Today's Best Music with "Ace & TJ in the Morning"
- WTPR-AM 710 "The Greatest Hits of All Time"
