= Dresden, Tennessee =

- Town
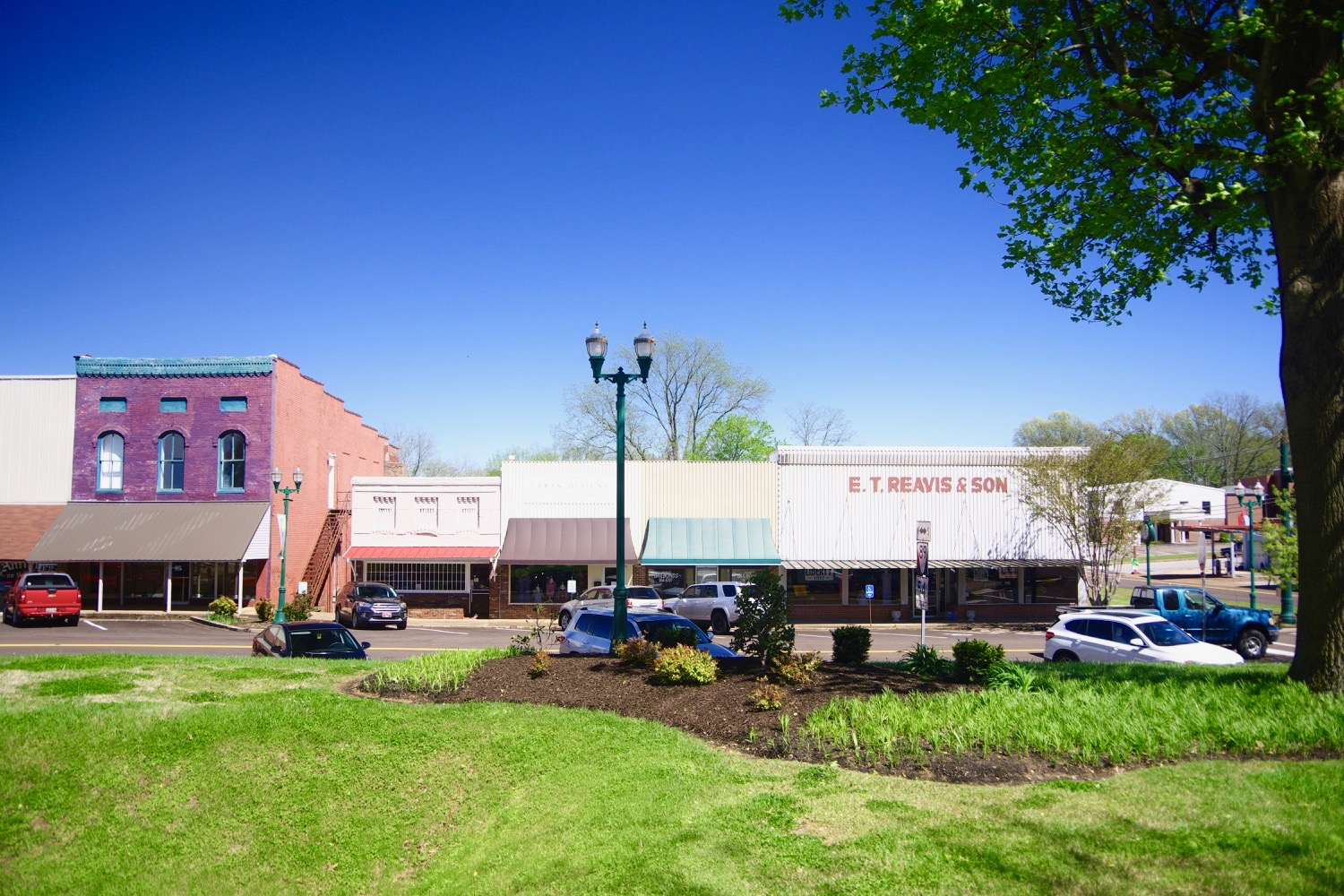
- Businesses along Wilson Street
- Motto: "A Great Place to Live"
- Location of Dresden in Weakley County, Tennessee.
- Coordinates: 36°17′2″N 88°41′54″W
- Country: United States
- State: Tennessee
- County: Weakley
- Established: 1825

Area
  - Total: 5.96 sq mi (15.43 km^{2})
  - Land: 5.94 sq mi (15.39 km^{2})
  - Water: 0.015 sq mi (0.04 km^{2})
- Elevation: 430 ft (130 m)

Population (2020)
  - Total: 3,019
  - Density: 508/sq mi (196.2/km^{2})
- Time zone: UTC-6 (Central (CST))
  - Summer (DST): UTC-5 (CDT)
- ZIP code: 38225
- Area code: 731
- FIPS code: 47-21540
- GNIS feature ID: 1282790
- Website: www.cityofdresden.net

Dresden is a town in and the county seat of Weakley County, Tennessee, United States. As of the 2020 census, Dresden had a population of 3,019.

== Geography ==
Dresden is located at 36°17′2″N 88°41′54″W (36.283805, -88.698296).

According to the United States Census Bureau, the town has a total area of 5.3 square miles (14 km^{2}), of which 5.3 square miles (14 km^{2}) is land and 0.19% is water.

=== Climate ===
The climate in this area is characterized by hot, humid summers and generally mild to cool winters. According to the Köppen Climate Classification system, Dresden has a humid subtropical climate, abbreviated "Cfa" on climate maps.

Climate data for Dresden, Tennessee (1991–2020 normals, extremes 1957–present)
Month	Jan	Feb	Mar	Apr	May	Jun	Jul	Aug	Sep	Oct	Nov	Dec	Year
Record high °F (°C)	75 (24)	81 (27)	88 (31)	90 (32)	96 (36)	104 (40)	103 (39)	104 (40)	101 (38)	94 (34)	87 (31)	78 (26)	104 (40)
Mean daily maximum °F (°C)	45.7 (7.6)	50.4 (10.2)	59.5 (15.3)	69.9 (21.1)	77.7 (25.4)	85.3 (29.6)	88.2 (31.2)	88.1 (31.2)	82.3 (27.9)	71.5 (21.9)	58.8 (14.9)	48.8 (9.3)	68.8 (20.4)
Daily mean °F (°C)	36.4 (2.4)	40.3 (4.6)	48.9 (9.4)	58.6 (14.8)	67.5 (19.7)	75.4 (24.1)	78.8 (26.0)	77.8 (25.4)	71.3 (21.8)	59.8 (15.4)	48.4 (9.1)	39.7 (4.3)	58.6 (14.8)
Mean daily minimum °F (°C)	27.1 (−2.7)	30.3 (−0.9)	38.2 (3.4)	47.3 (8.5)	57.2 (14.0)	65.4 (18.6)	69.3 (20.7)	67.5 (19.7)	60.3 (15.7)	48.0 (8.9)	38.0 (3.3)	30.5 (−0.8)	48.3 (9.1)
Record low °F (°C)	−17 (−27)	−5 (−21)	0 (−18)	22 (−6)	33 (1)	43 (6)	48 (9)	47 (8)	35 (2)	23 (−5)	10 (−12)	−11 (−24)	−17 (−27)
Average precipitation inches (mm)	3.88 (99)	4.80 (122)	4.84 (123)	5.08 (129)	5.91 (150)	4.61 (117)	4.45 (113)	3.19 (81)	3.89 (99)	3.64 (92)	4.31 (109)	4.96 (126)	53.56 (1,360)
Average snowfall inches (cm)	0.0 (0.0)	0.3 (0.76)	0.1 (0.25)	0.0 (0.0)	0.0 (0.0)	0.0 (0.0)	0.0 (0.0)	0.0 (0.0)	0.0 (0.0)	0.0 (0.0)	0.0 (0.0)	0.0 (0.0)	0.4 (1.0)
Average precipitation days (≥ 0.01 in)	9.6	8.6	9.7	10.6	11.3	10.3	9.3	6.9	7.6	8.0	9.2	9.4	110.5
Average snowy days (≥ 0.1 in)	0.1	0.1	0.1	0.0	0.0	0.0	0.0	0.0	0.0	0.0	0.0	0.0	0.3
Source: NOAA

== Demographics ==
Historical population
Census	Pop.	Note	%±
1850	633		—
1860	754		19.1%
1870	355		−52.9%
1880	314		−11.5%
1890	420		33.8%
1910	708		—
1920	1,007		42.2%
1930	1,047		4.0%
1940	1,115		6.5%
1950	1,509		35.3%
1960	1,510		0.1%
1970	1,939		28.4%
1980	2,256		16.3%
1990	2,488		10.3%
2000	2,855		14.8%
2010	3,005		5.3%
2020	3,019		0.5%

=== 2020 census ===
As of the 2020 census, Dresden had a population of 3,019. The median age was 40.9 years. 21.9% of residents were under the age of 18 and 19.8% of residents were 65 years of age or older. For every 100 females, there were 90.0 males, and for every 100 females age 18 and over there were 86.2 males.

0.0% of residents lived in urban areas, while 100.0% lived in rural areas.

There were 1,226 households in Dresden, of which 27.2% had children under the age of 18 living in them. Of all households, 39.5% were married-couple households, 17.5% were households with a male householder and no spouse or partner present, and 36.5% were households with a female householder and no spouse or partner present. About 34.1% of all households were made up of individuals and 17.5% had someone living alone who was 65 years of age or older. As of the 2020 census, there were 800 families residing in the town.

There were 1,381 housing units, of which 11.2% were vacant. The homeowner vacancy rate was 2.6% and the rental vacancy rate was 6.0%.

Dresden racial composition
Race	Num.	Perc.
White (non-Hispanic)	2,675	88.61%
Black or African American (non-Hispanic)	138	4.57%
Native American	4	0.13%
Asian	9	0.3%
Pacific Islander	1	0.03%
Other/Mixed	115	3.81%
Hispanic or Latino	77	2.55%

=== 2000 census ===
As of the census of 2000, there were 2,855 people, 1,212 households, and 784 families residing in the town. The population density was 537.9 inhabitants per square mile (207.7/km^{2}). There were 1,331 housing units at an average density of 250.8 per square mile (96.8/km^{2}). The racial makeup of the town was 94.54% White, 4.34% African American, 0.04% Native American, 0.35% Asian, 0.14% from other races, and 0.60% from two or more races. Hispanic or Latino of any race were 0.46% of the population.

There were 1,212 households, out of which 26.7% had children under the age of 18 living with them, 48.6% were married couples living together, 12.8% had a female householder with no husband present, and 35.3% were non-families. 31.9% of all households were made up of individuals, and 17.3% had someone living alone who was 65 years of age or older. The average household size was 2.22 and the average family size was 2.78.

In the town, the population was spread out, with 20.7% under the age of 18, 9.5% from 18 to 24, 27.7% from 25 to 44, 21.8% from 45 to 64, and 20.3% who were 65 years of age or older. The median age was 39 years. For every 100 females, there were 86.8 males. For every 100 females age 18 and over, there were 84.8 males.

The median income for a household in the town was $26,701, and the median income for a family was $37,321. Males had a median income of $27,589 versus $21,322 for females. The per capita income for the town was $16,286. About 6.4% of families and 10.6% of the population were below the poverty line, including 10.0% of those under age 18 and 16.7% of those age 65 or over.

== Education ==
Dresden's educational system consists of a combined elementary and middle school, a high school, an alternative school, and a vocational school. The high school was consolidated in 1998 to include students from the neighboring town of Palmersville.

== Recreation ==
Recreational activities in Dresden include a public park with a walking track, a public library, and a smaller park that is more akin to a public garden. There are a variety of civic clubs, as well as local troops of the Boy Scouts of America and the Girl Scouts. Additionally, a number of summer festivals in neighboring towns are popular with the residents of Dresden (just as the Iris Festival in Dresden is popular with the residents of those towns).

== Points of interest ==
The Dresden Post Office contains a mural, Retrospection, painted in 1938 by Minetta Good. Murals were produced from 1934 to 1943 in the United States through the Section of Painting and Sculpture, later called the Section of Fine Arts, of the Treasury Department.

== Notable people ==
- Matt Beaty, first baseman for Kansas City Royals
- Lin Dunn, former WNBA coach of Indiana Fever
- Emerson Etheridge, Civil War-era congressman and candidate for governor
- Roy Herron, Tennessee politician, attorney, and author
- Popeye Jones, professional basketball player
- Ned McWherter, former Governor of Tennessee
- Mike Pyle, mixed martial arts fighter
- William D. Vincent, U.S. Representative from Kansas
- Swede Halbrook, NBA player and one of the tallest people in history
