= Gleason, Tennessee =

- Town
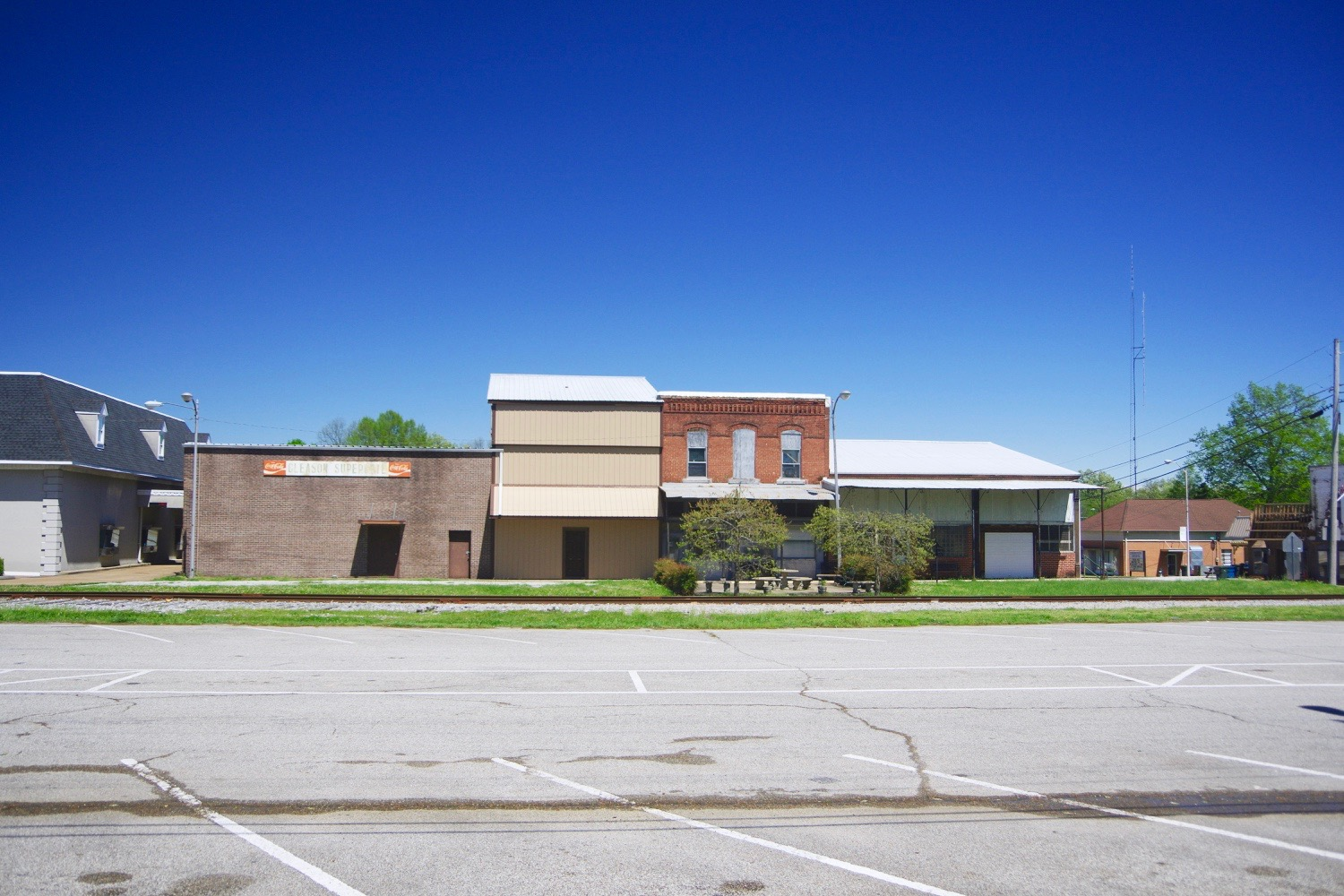
- Buildings along State Championship Road

- Location of Gleason in Weakley County, Tennessee.
- Coordinates: 36°12′56″N 88°36′44″W
- Country: United States
- State: Tennessee
- County: Weakley

Area
  - Total: 2.24 sq mi (5.81 km^{2})
  - Land: 2.24 sq mi (5.81 km^{2})
  - Water: 0 sq mi (0.00 km^{2})
- Elevation: 407 ft (124 m)

Population (2020)
  - Total: 1,369
  - Density: 610.3/sq mi (235.64/km^{2})
- Time zone: UTC-6 (Central (CST))
  - Summer (DST): UTC-5 (CDT)
- ZIP code: 38229
- Area code: 731
- FIPS code: 47-29300
- GNIS feature ID: 1303460
- Website: cityofgleasontn.com

Gleason is a town in Weakley County, Tennessee, United States. As of the 2020 census, Gleason had a population of 1,369. The city holds an annual Tater Town Parade and festival in the fall. Gleason is the hometown of Gordon Stoker, first tenor of the famous backup group The Jordanaires.

== Geography ==
Gleason is located at 36°12′56″N 88°36′44″W (36.215641, -88.612114).

According to the United States Census Bureau, the town has a total area of 2.3 square miles (6.0 km^{2}), all land.

== Demographics ==
Historical population
Census	Pop.	Note	%±
1880	121		—
1890	324		167.8%
1910	388		—
1920	402		3.6%
1930	760		89.1%
1940	883		16.2%
1950	1,063		20.4%
1960	900		−15.3%
1970	1,314		46.0%
1980	1,335		1.6%
1990	1,402		5.0%
2000	1,463		4.4%
2010	1,445		−1.2%
2020	1,369		−5.3%

=== 2020 census ===
Gleason racial composition
Race	Num.	Perc.
White (non-Hispanic)	1,295	94.59%
Black or African American (non-Hispanic)	13	0.95%
Native American	7	0.51%
Other/Mixed	35	2.56%
Hispanic or Latino	19	1.39%

As of the 2020 United States census, there were 1,369 people, 604 households, and 394 families residing in the town.

=== 2000 census ===
As of the census of 2000, there were 1,463 people, 599 households, and 431 families residing in the town. The population density was 640.5 inhabitants per square mile (247.3/km^{2}). There were 657 housing units at an average density of 287.6 per square mile (111.0/km^{2}). The racial makeup of the town was 98.43% White, 0.55% African American, 0.34% Native American, 0.41% from other races, and 0.27% from two or more races. Hispanic or Latino of any race were 1.37% of the population.

There were 599 households, out of which 36.2% had children under the age of 18 living with them, 54.3% were married couples living together, 12.4% had a female householder with no husband present, and 27.9% were non-families. 25.4% of all households were made up of individuals, and 11.9% had someone living alone who was 65 years of age or older. The average household size was 2.44 and the average family size was 2.89.

In the town, the population was spread out, with 27.5% under the age of 18, 7.3% from 18 to 24, 28.2% from 25 to 44, 22.9% from 45 to 64, and 14.1% who were 65 years of age or older. The median age was 35 years. For every 100 females, there were 91.2 males. For every 100 females age 18 and over, there were 86.6 males.

The median income for a household in the town was $29,597, and the median income for a family was $35,000. Males had a median income of $26,397 versus $19,643 for females. The per capita income for the town was $13,747. About 13.6% of families and 15.0% of the population were below the poverty line, including 18.4% of those under age 18 and 16.4% of those age 65 or over.

== Notable Natives ==
- Mike Snider, Grand Ole Opry star, was born and maintains a home in Gleason.
- Ashley McElhiney, attended Gleason School and won the Tennessee State 1A Miss Basketball in 1999. After a spectacular basketball career at Vanderbilt University, she became the first female manager of a male professional basketball team, the Nashville Rhythm.

== Gleason School ==
The most notable building in the town is Gleason School, a Pre-K through 12 school with a population of 470 (2017) in the Weakley County School system. The school is split into three parts, the elementary school (K-5), the junior high school (6-8), and the high school (9-12).

The girls high school basketball team, the Lady Bulldogs, won the state championships in 1992, 1999 and 2007.

== Media ==
- WRQR-FM 105.5 "Today's Best Music with "Ace & TJ in the Morning"
- WTPR-AM 710 "The Greatest Hits of All Time"
- WTPR-FM 101.7 "The Greatest Hits of All Time"
- WFGS-FM 103.7, Froggy
