= Rutherford, Tennessee =

- Town
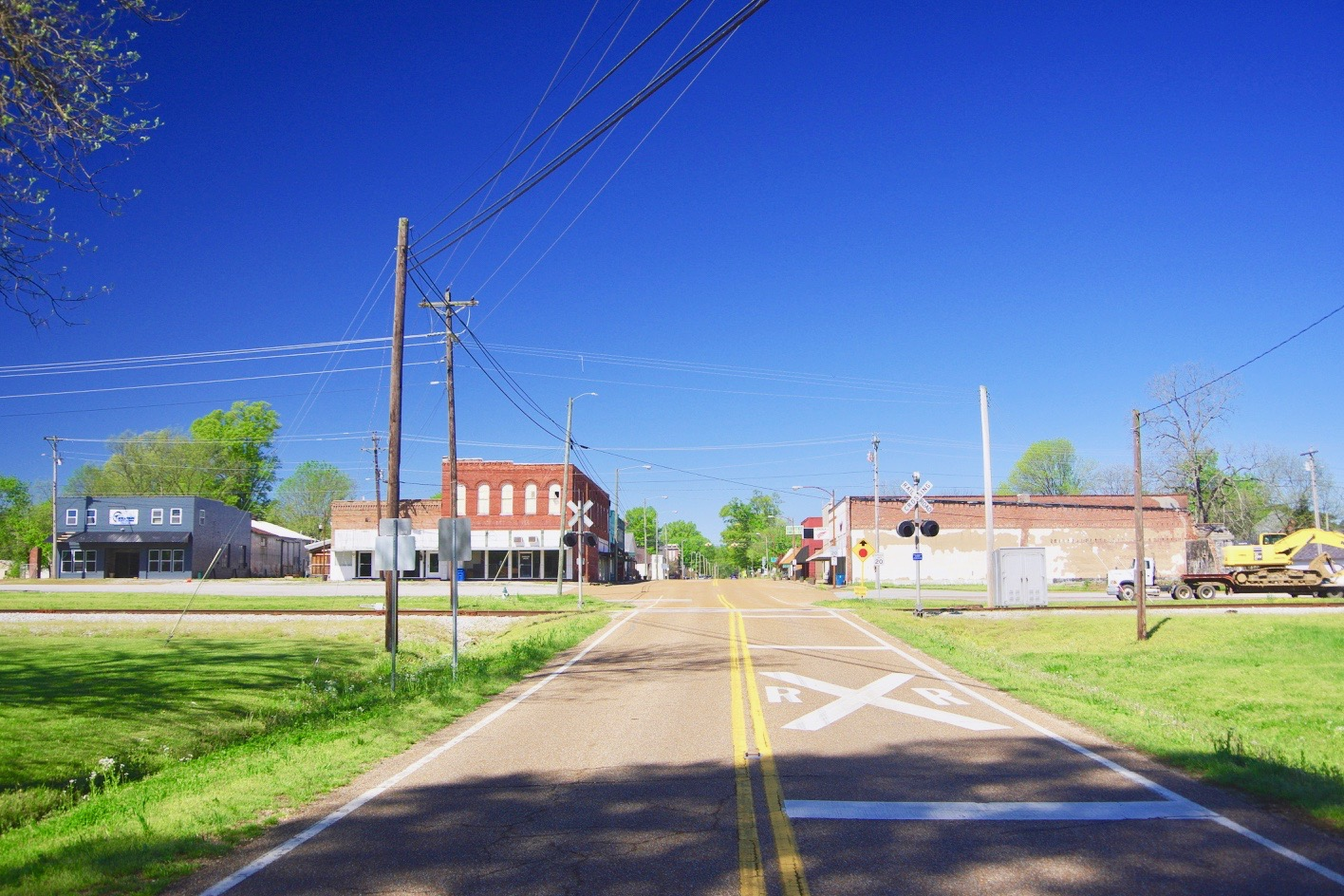
- Buildings along Main and Front
- Nickname: The Last Home of Davy Crockett
- Location of Rutherford in Gibson County, Tennessee.
- Coordinates: 36°7′32″N 88°59′24″W
- Country: United States
- State: Tennessee
- County: Gibson

Government
  - Mayor: Sandy Simpson (2020)

Area
  - Total: 2.32 sq mi (6.00 km^{2})
  - Land: 2.31 sq mi (5.97 km^{2})
  - Water: 0.015 sq mi (0.04 km^{2})
- Elevation: 331 ft (101 m)

Population (2020)
  - Total: 1,163
  - Density: 505.0/sq mi (194.97/km^{2})
- Time zone: UTC-6 (Central (CST))
  - Summer (DST): UTC-5 (CDT)
- ZIP code: 38369
- Area code: 731
- FIPS code: 47-65760
- GNIS feature ID: 1300352

Rutherford is a town in Gibson County, Tennessee, United States. As of the 2020 census, Rutherford had a population of 1,163.

== Geography ==
Rutherford is located at 36°07′32″N 88°59′24″W.

According to the United States Census Bureau, the town has a total area of 2.3 square miles (6.0 km^{2}), of which 2.2 square miles (5.7 km^{2}) is land and 0.44% is water. The current mayor is Sandy Simpson (2020).

== Demographics ==
Historical population
Census	Pop.	Note	%±
1880	323		—
1890	536		65.9%
1900	677		26.3%
1910	766		13.1%
1920	792		3.4%
1930	747		−5.7%
1940	771		3.2%
1950	994		28.9%
1960	983		−1.1%
1970	1,385		40.9%
1980	1,378		−0.5%
1990	1,303		−5.4%
2000	1,272		−2.4%
2010	1,151		−9.5%
2020	1,163		1.0%

As of the census of 2010, there were 1,151 people, 500 households, and 329 families residing in the town. The population density was 500.4 inhabitants per square mile (193.2/km^{2}). There were 569 housing units at an average density of 247.4 per square mile (95.5/km^{2}). The racial makeup of the town was 82.5% White, 16.1% African American, 0.1% Native American, and 0.8% from two or more races. Hispanic or Latino of any race were 1% of the population.

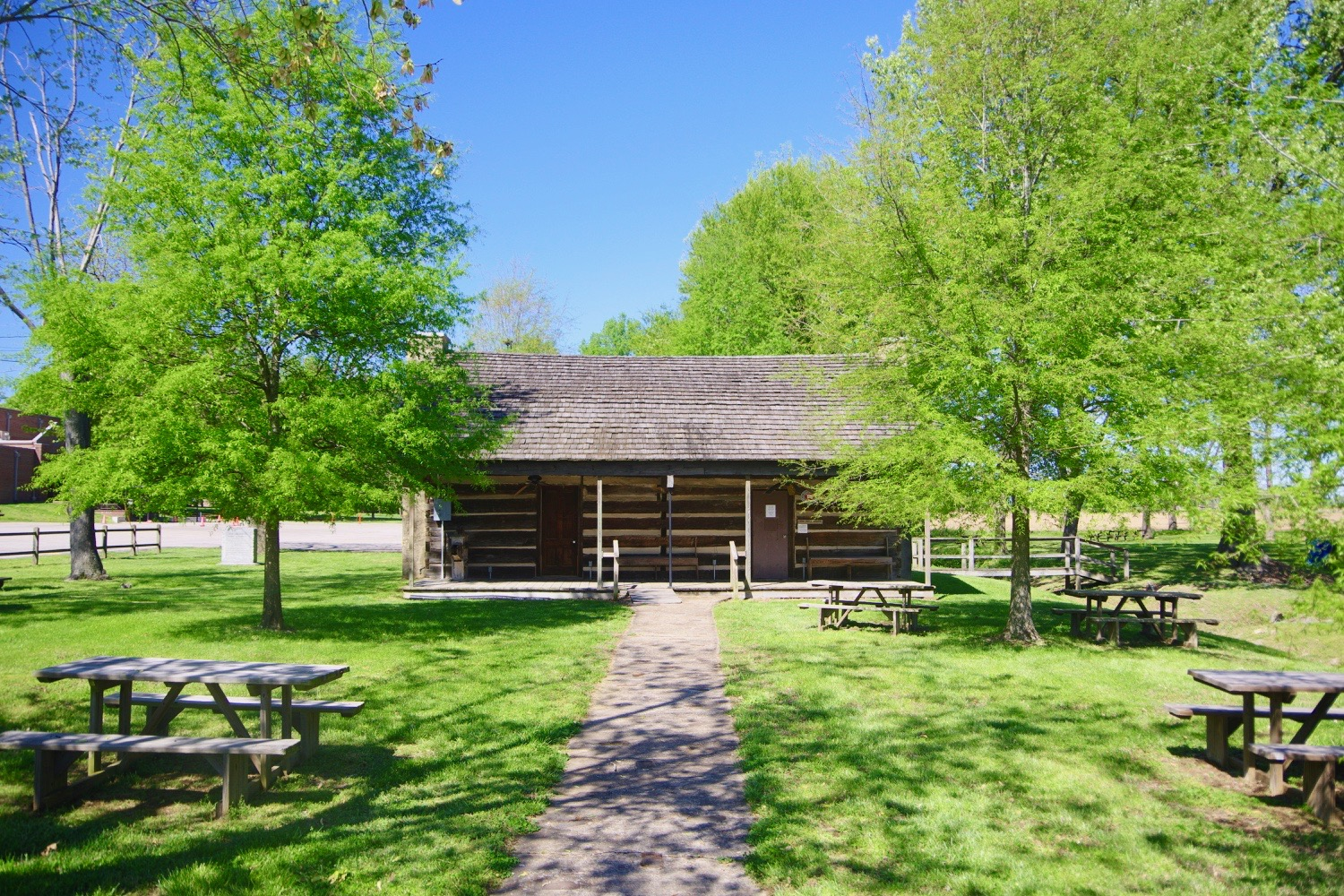
Davy Crockett Cabin

There were 500 households, out of which 26.8% had children under the age of 18 living with them, 43.8% were married couples living together, 16.6% had a female householder with no husband present, and 34.2% were non-families. 32.4% of all households were made up of individuals, and 15.6% had someone living alone who was 65 years of age or older. The average household size was 2.3 and the average family size was 2.91.

In the town, the population was spread out, with 25% under the age of 20, 4.4% from 20 to 24, 22.8% from 25 to 44, 26.7% from 45 to 64, and 21% who were 65 years of age or older. The median age was 43.5 years. For every 100 females, there were 82.7 males. For every 100 females age 18 and over, there were 78.7 males.

The median income for a household in the town was $28,500, and the median income for a family was $41,250. Males had a median income of $30,625 versus $21,103 for females. The per capita income for the town was $15,311. About 15.9% of the population were below the poverty line.

== Education ==
Gibson County Special School District is the area school district.

The district operates Rutherford's K-8 public schools. Their mascot is a pirate. High school students from Rutherford are zoned to, and generally attend the consolidated Gibson County High School, also operated by the district, located just south of Dyer. Prior to consolidation in 1980, Rutherford High School served the community.

== Attractions and history ==
Rutherford promotes itself as the "Last Home of Davy Crockett". Crockett's reconstructed cabin is located in downtown Rutherford as is the grave of his mother. Rutherford hosts a community festival called "Davy Crockett Days" each year. Past grand marshals of the Davy Crockett Days Parade include Fess Parker who portrayed Davy Crockett in the 1954 Walt Disney television series Ballad of Davy Crockett.

== Media ==
=== Radio Stations ===
- WWGY 99.3 "Today's Best Music with Ace & TJ in the Morning"
- WENK-AM 1240 "The Greatest Hits of All Time"
- WTPR-AM 710 "The Greatest Hits of All Time"
- VICTORY937 WTKB-FM 93.7 "The Victory 93.7 Contemporary Christian"
