= Obion River =

River in Tennessee, USA

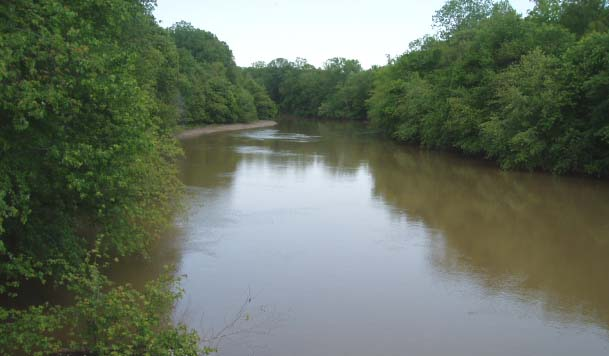
- The Obion River near Obion

Location
- Country: US
- State: Tennessee

Physical characteristics
- Mouth
  - location: Mississippi River on the border of Dyer and Lauderdale counties.
  - coordinates: 35°54′27″N 89°38′20″W
  - elevation: 230 ft (70 m)

The Obion River system is the primary surface water drainage system of northwestern Tennessee, United States.

== Description ==
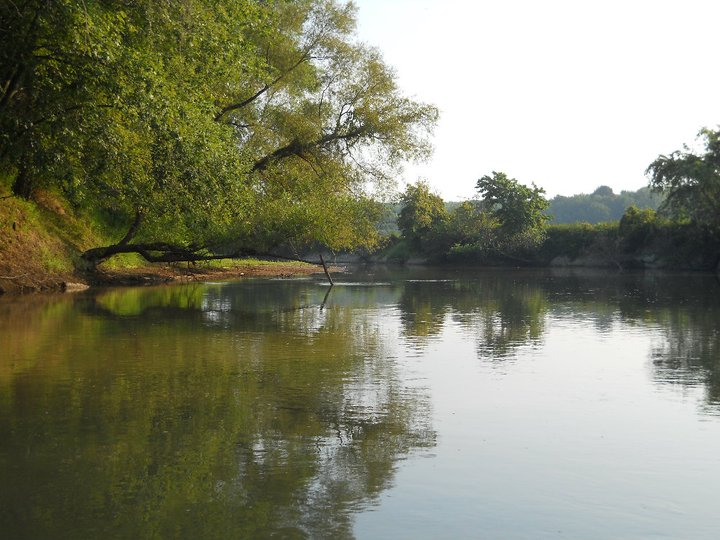
Local swimming hole on Obion River in West Tennessee, February 2012

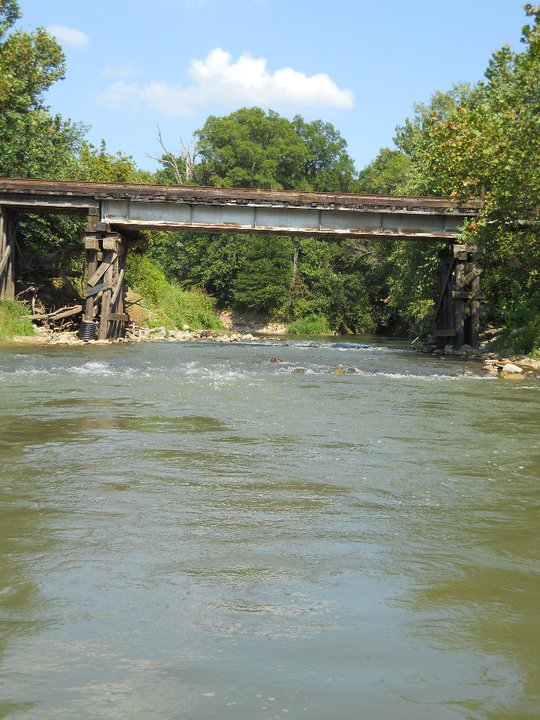
CSX railroad bridge crossing Middle Fork of Obion River northwest of Gleason, February 2012

The Obion has four major forks, the North Fork, Middle Fork, South Fork and Rutherford Fork (which is named after Henry Rutherford an early surveyor of the area). The confluences of these forks are a few miles above the mouth of the Obion's discharge into the Mississippi River. For the greater parts of their lengths, the forks exist as separate streams.

In the mid-20th century, the Obion system was largely channelized for agricultural purposes, under the auspices of the Obion-Forked Deer Basin Authority, a Tennessee state agency that coordinated this work with the United States Army Corps of Engineers. Some of the adverse effects of channelization included increasing erosion of land, loss of wildlife habitat, and increased flooding downstream. But with the restoration of wetlands along the river in the 21st century, this process has now been halted and – in a few places – somewhat reversed.

The origin of the name "Obion" is obscure. Some say that it is derived from a Native American word and others that it represents a corruption of the name of an Irish fur trapper, O'Bion or, perhaps, O'Brien.

Obion County, Tennessee, is named after the Obion River.

After the 1818 Chickasaw cession of West Tennessee (known in Kentucky as Jackson Purchase), explorer Davy Crockett moved to the South Fork Obion River in Weakley County (present-day Gibson County after restructuring of the county in 1837). There he built a log cabin along the river, where he and his family resided until his trip to Texas in 1835.

On February 16th, 2025 a levee along the Obion River failed, resulting in widespread flooding in multiple counties in West Tennessee. The entire town of Rives was completely flooding resulting in water rescues.wpsd

== See also ==
- List of Tennessee rivers
