= Weakley County, Tennessee =

County in Tennessee, United States

- County
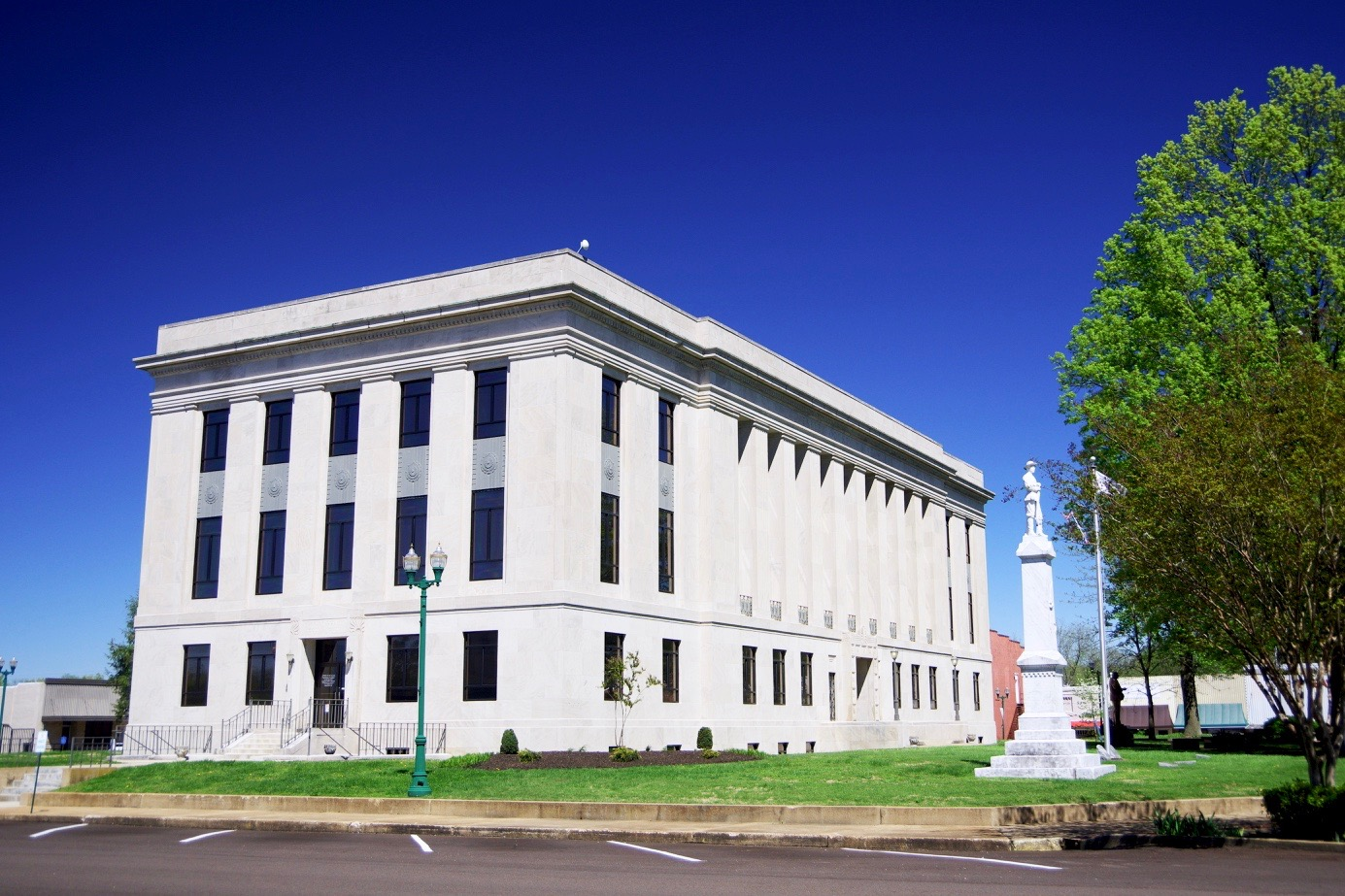
- Weakley County Courthouse in Dresden

- Seal

- Location within the U.S. state of Tennessee
- Coordinates: 36°17′N 88°43′W
- Country: United States
- State: Tennessee
- Founded: October 21, 1823
- Named for: Robert Weakley
- Seat: Dresden
- Largest city: Martin

Government
  - Mayor: Dale Hutcherson (R)

Area
  - Total: 582 sq mi (1,510 km^{2})
  - Land: 580 sq mi (1,500 km^{2})
  - Water: 1.4 sq mi (3.6 km^{2}) 0.2%

Population (2020)
  - Total: 32,902
  - Estimate (2025): 33,261 ▲
  - Density: 57/sq mi (22/km^{2})
- Time zone: UTC−6 (Central)
  - Summer (DST): UTC−5 (CDT)
- Congressional district: 8th
- Website: www.weakleycountytn.gov

Weakley County is a county located in the northwest of the U.S. state of Tennessee. As of the 2020 census, the population was 32,902. Its county seat is Dresden. Its largest city is Martin, the home of the University of Tennessee at Martin. The county was established by the Tennessee General Assembly on October 21, 1823, and is named for U.S. Congressman Robert Weakley (1764–1845). Weakley County comprises the Martin, TN Micropolitan Statistical Area.

== History ==
Weakley County was created in October 1823 from some of the land that the Chickasaw people ceded to the United States in the Treaty of 1818. The county was named after Colonel Robert Weakley, a member of the House of Representatives, a speaker of the State Senate, and the man commissioned to treat (negotiate) with the Chickasaw.

During the 19th century, the county was the state's largest corn producer. By the latter half of the 20th century, soybeans became the county's leading crop.

== Geography ==
According to the U.S. Census Bureau, the county has a total area of 582 square miles (1,510 km^{2}), of which 580 square miles (1,500 km^{2}) is land and 1.4 square miles (3.6 km^{2}) (0.2%) is water. The North Fork of the Obion River flows through the northern half of the county, the Middle Fork flows across the central portion of the county, and the South Fork flows across the southern part of the county. The Obion is a tributary of the Mississippi River.

=== Adjacent counties ===
- Hickman County, Kentucky (northwest)
- Graves County, Kentucky (north)
- Henry County (east)
- Carroll County (southeast)
- Gibson County (southwest)
- Obion County (west)

=== State protected areas ===
- Bean Switch Refuge
- Big Cypress Tree State Natural Area
- Big Cypress Tree State Park
- Harts Mill Wetland Wildlife Management Area (part)
- Obion River Wildlife Management Area (part)

== Demographics ==
Historical population
Census	Pop.	Note	%±
1830	4,797		—
1840	9,870		105.8%
1850	14,608		48.0%
1860	18,216		24.7%
1870	20,755		13.9%
1880	24,538		18.2%
1890	28,955		18.0%
1900	32,546		12.4%
1910	31,929		−1.9%
1920	31,053		−2.7%
1930	29,262		−5.8%
1940	29,498		0.8%
1950	27,962		−5.2%
1960	24,227		−13.4%
1970	28,827		19.0%
1980	32,896		14.1%
1990	31,972		−2.8%
2000	34,895		9.1%
2010	35,021		0.4%
2020	32,902		−6.1%
2025 (est.)	33,261	▲	1.1%
U.S. Decennial Census; 1790-1960 1900-1990; 1990-2000 2010-2014

=== 2020 census ===
Weakley County racial composition
Race	Num.	Perc.
White (non-Hispanic)	27,813	84.53%
Black or African American (non-Hispanic)	2,593	7.88%
Native American	52	0.16%
Asian	192	0.58%
Pacific Islander	3	0.01%
Other/Mixed	1,344	4.08%
Hispanic or Latino	905	2.75%

As of the 2020 census, there were 32,902 people, 13,373 households, and 8,677 families residing in the county. The median age was 39.0 years; 19.5% of residents were under the age of 18 and 18.7% were 65 years of age or older. For every 100 females there were 93.6 males, and for every 100 females age 18 and over there were 91.0 males age 18 and over.

The racial makeup of the county was 85.4% White, 7.9% Black or African American, 0.2% American Indian and Alaska Native, 0.6% Asian, <0.1% Native Hawaiian and Pacific Islander, 1.1% from some other race, and 4.7% from two or more races; Hispanic or Latino residents of any race comprised 2.8% of the population.

32.6% of residents lived in urban areas, while 67.4% lived in rural areas.

There were 13,373 households in the county, of which 26.6% had children under the age of 18 living in them. Of all households, 44.2% were married-couple households, 20.0% were households with a male householder and no spouse or partner present, and 29.2% were households with a female householder and no spouse or partner present. About 31.2% of all households were made up of individuals and 13.5% had someone living alone who was 65 years of age or older.

There were 14,945 housing units, of which 10.5% were vacant. Among occupied housing units, 64.3% were owner-occupied and 35.7% were renter-occupied. The homeowner vacancy rate was 1.5% and the rental vacancy rate was 8.8%.

=== 2000 census ===
As of the census of 2000, there were 34,895 people, 13,599 households, and 9,124 families residing in the county. The population density was 60 people per square mile (23 people/km^{2}). There were 14,928 housing units at an average density of 26 units per square mile (10/km^{2}). The racial makeup of the county was 90.27% White, 6.95% Black or African American, 0.15% Native American, 1.32% Asian, 0.01% Pacific Islander, 0.52% from other races, and 0.78% from two or more races. 1.15% of the population were Hispanic or Latino of any race.

There were 13,599 households, out of which 29.40% had children under the age of 18 living with them, 54.20% were married couples living together, 9.50% had a female householder with no husband present, and 32.90% were non-families. 27.00% of all households were made up of individuals, and 11.50% had someone living alone who was 65 years of age or older. The average household size was 2.38 and the average family size was 2.89.

The population was spread out, with 21.60% under the age of 18, 15.90% from 18 to 24, 26.10% from 25 to 44, 21.90% from 45 to 64, and 14.50% who were 65 years of age or older. The median age was 35 years. For every 100 females there were 94.20 males. For every 100 females age 18 and over, there were 91.10 males.

The median income for a household in the county was $30,008, and the median income for a family was $38,658. Males had a median income of $28,597 versus $20,845 for females. The per capita income for the county was $15,408. About 11.10% of families and 16.00% of the population were below the poverty line, including 16.80% of those under age 18 and 16.20% of those age 65 or over.

== Media ==
=== Radio ===
- WWGY 99.3 "Today's Best Music with "Ace & TJ in the Morning"
- WRQR-FM 105.5 "Today's Best Music with "Ace & TJ in the Morning"
- WENK-AM 1240 "The Greatest Hits of All Time"
- WTPR-AM 710 "The Greatest Hits of All Time"
- WTPR-FM 101.7 "The Greatest Hits of All Time"
- WCMT-AM 1410 100.5FM
- WCMT-FM 101.3
- WUTM-FM 90.3
- (WCDZ FM 95.1 and 102.9FM)
- WCMT-AM 1410 "your best friend"

=== Print ===
- Dresden Enterprise – located in Dresden, the county seat
- The Weakley County Press – located in Martin
- The Pacer – Student newspaper of the University of Tennessee at Martin

== Education ==
=== Weakley County Schools ===
School District website: http://www.weakleyschools.com/

School name	Team mascot	School colors	School website
Dresden Elementary School	Lions	Black, Gold	https://des.weakleyschools.com/o/des
Dresden Middle School	Lions	Black/Gold	https://dms.weakleyschools.com/o/dms
Dresden High School	Lions	Black/Gold	https://dhs.weakleyschools.com/o/dhs
Gleason School	Bulldogs	Orange/Black	https://gls.weakleyschools.com/o/gls
Greenfield School	Yellowjackets	Black/Orange	https://grs.weakleyschools.com/o/grs
Martin Elementary School	Chargers	Blue/White	https://mes.weakleyschools.com/o/mes
Martin Middle School	Chargers	Blue/White	https://mms.weakleyschools.com/o/mms
Martin Primary School	N/A	Blue/Yellow	https://mps.weakleyschools.com/o/mps
Sharon School	Eagles	Purple/Yellow	https://ss.weakleyschools.com/o/ss
Westview High School	Chargers	Royal Blue/Yellow Gold	https://whs.weakleyschools.com/o/whs

== Communities ==
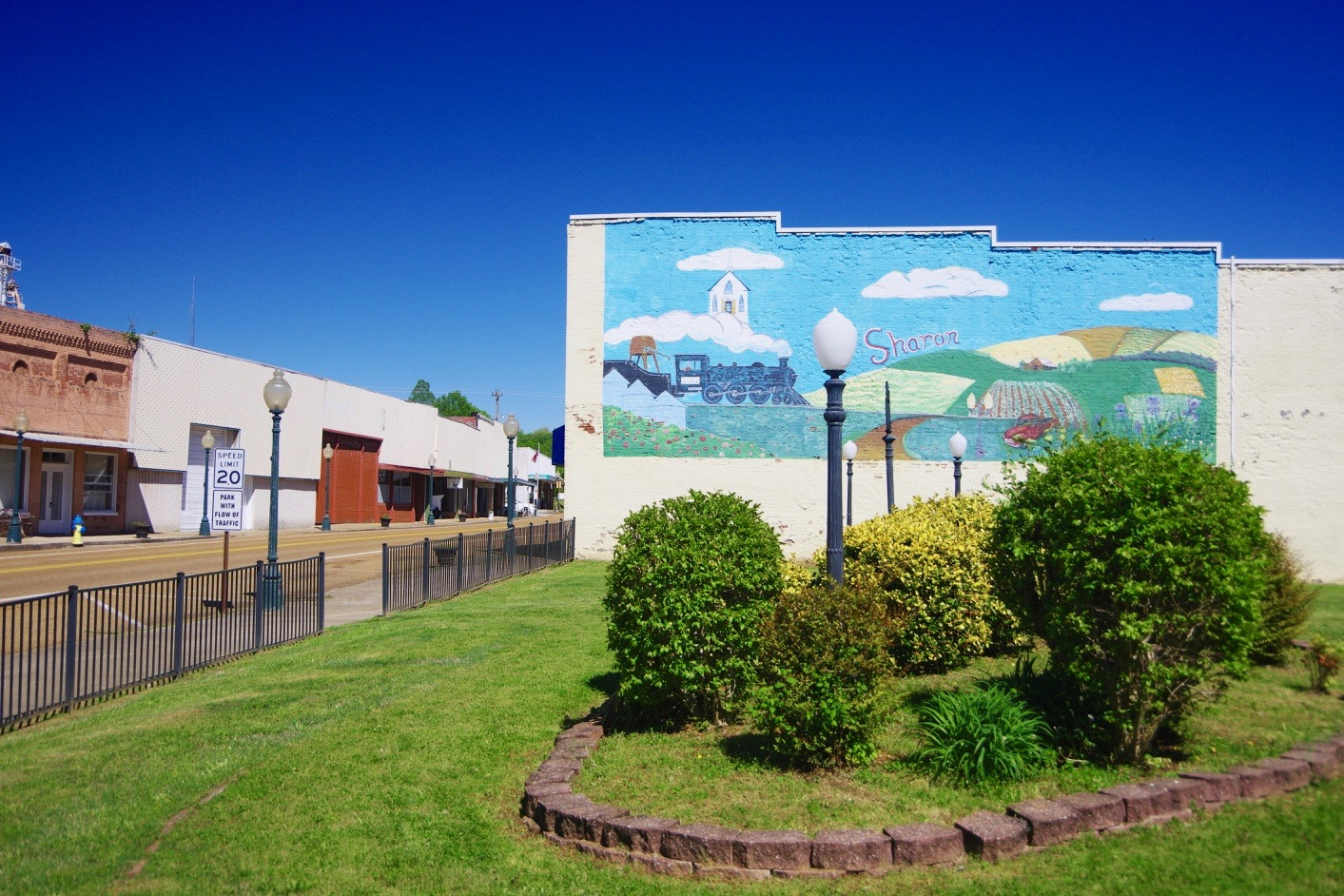
Sharon

=== Cities ===
- Greenfield
- Martin
- McKenzie (mostly in Carroll County and a small portion in Henry County)

=== Towns ===
- Dresden (county seat)
- Gleason
- Sharon

=== Census-designated places ===
- Dukedom
- Palmersville

=== Unincorporated communities ===
- Austin Springs
- Boydsville
- Gardner
- Latham

== Politics ==
United States presidential election results for Weakley County, Tennessee
Year	Republican		Democratic		Third party(ies)	
Year	No.	%	No.	%	No.	%
1912	1,265	28.38%	2,810	63.03%	383	8.59%
1916	1,768	32.84%	3,609	67.04%	6	0.11%
1920	2,741	38.25%	4,395	61.33%	30	0.42%
1924	1,154	26.67%	3,149	72.78%	24	0.55%
1928	1,358	35.25%	2,495	64.75%	0	0.00%
1932	783	17.11%	3,777	82.52%	17	0.37%
1936	928	22.03%	3,254	77.26%	30	0.71%
1940	1,139	24.51%	3,474	74.74%	35	0.75%
1944	1,595	31.65%	3,434	68.15%	10	0.20%
1948	1,310	27.06%	3,099	64.02%	432	8.92%
1952	3,043	41.83%	4,198	57.70%	34	0.47%
1956	2,720	36.22%	4,717	62.81%	73	0.97%
1960	3,543	43.69%	4,488	55.35%	78	0.96%
1964	2,684	34.21%	5,161	65.79%	0	0.00%
1968	2,858	30.50%	1,988	21.21%	4,525	48.29%
1972	5,836	71.48%	2,027	24.83%	302	3.70%
1976	2,875	29.65%	6,605	68.12%	216	2.23%
1980	5,668	48.15%	5,910	50.21%	193	1.64%
1984	6,480	57.41%	4,752	42.10%	55	0.49%
1988	5,701	57.07%	4,239	42.44%	49	0.49%
1992	4,800	40.44%	5,691	47.95%	1,378	11.61%
1996	4,622	41.21%	5,657	50.44%	936	8.35%
2000	6,106	51.55%	5,570	47.03%	168	1.42%
2004	7,817	57.92%	5,588	41.40%	91	0.67%
2008	8,855	64.68%	4,596	33.57%	239	1.75%
2012	8,605	69.75%	3,548	28.76%	184	1.49%
2016	9,008	73.93%	2,772	22.75%	404	3.32%
2020	10,396	75.69%	3,020	21.99%	319	2.32%
2024	10,541	78.70%	2,725	20.34%	128	0.96%

== See also ==
- National Register of Historic Places listings in Weakley County, Tennessee
