= Bradford, Tennessee =

- Town
- Nickname: Doodle Soup Capital of the World
- Location of Bradford in Gibson County, Tennessee.
- Coordinates: 36°4′33″N 88°48′54″W
- Country: United States
- State: Tennessee
- County: Gibson

Area
  - Total: 1.77 sq mi (4.58 km^{2})
  - Land: 1.77 sq mi (4.58 km^{2})
  - Water: 0 sq mi (0.00 km^{2})
- Elevation: 364 ft (111 m)

Population (2020)
  - Total: 1,001
  - Density: 565.5/sq mi (218.36/km^{2})
- Time zone: UTC-6 (Central (CST))
  - Summer (DST): UTC-5 (CDT)
- ZIP code: 38316
- Area code: 731
- FIPS code: 47-07860
- GNIS feature ID: 1305379
- Website: https://www.cityofbradford.net/

Bradford is a town in Gibson County, Tennessee, United States. As of the 2020 census, Bradford had a population of 1,001.

== History ==
Bradford was named for Robert E. Bradford, an early settler. A post office has been in operation at Bradford since 1874.

During the tornado outbreak of April 2, 2006, much of northern Bradford was damaged or destroyed; six residents of the area were killed, though none lived within the city limits.

== Geography ==
According to the United States Census Bureau, Bradford has a total area of 1.8 square miles (4.7 km^{2}), all land.

== Demographics ==
Historical population
Census	Pop.	Note	%±
1890	222		—
1920	507		—
1930	570		12.4%
1940	612		7.4%
1950	599		−2.1%
1960	763		27.4%
1970	968		26.9%
1980	1,146		18.4%
1990	1,154		0.7%
2000	1,113		−3.6%
2010	1,048		−5.8%
2020	1,001		−4.5%

As of the census of 2000, there were 1,113 people, 472 households, and 320 families residing in the town. The population density was 625.5 inhabitants per square mile (241.5/km^{2}). There were 510 housing units at an average density of 286.6 per square mile (110.7/km^{2}). The racial makeup of the town was 89.94% White, 9.70% African American, 0.09% Native American, 0.09% Asian, and 0.18% from two or more races. Hispanic or Latino of any race were 0.54% of the population.

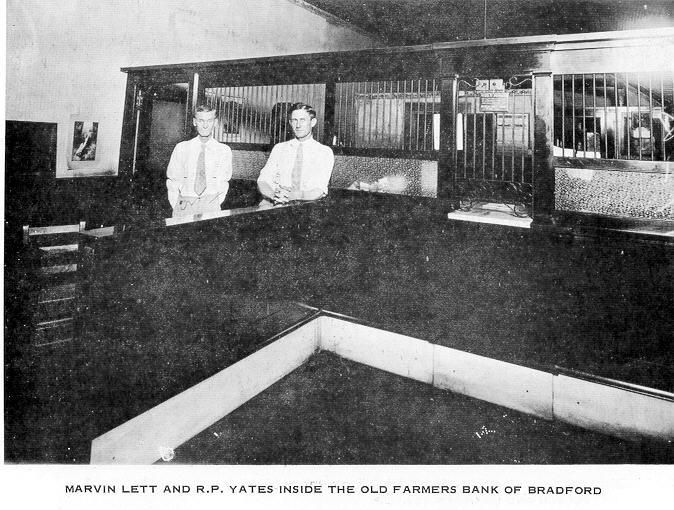
Inside Bradford Bank in 1919.

There were 472 households, out of which 25.8% had children under the age of 18 living with them, 53.0% were married couples living together, 12.7% had a female householder with no husband present, and 32.0% were non-families. 27.8% of all households were made up of individuals, and 14.8% had someone living alone who was 65 years of age or older. The average household size was 2.36 and the average family size was 2.89.

In the town, the population was spread out, with 22.2% under the age of 18, 6.9% from 18 to 24, 25.9% from 25 to 44, 25.6% from 45 to 64, and 19.4% who were 65 years of age or older. The median age was 41 years. For every 100 females, there were 81.9 males. For every 100 females age 18 and over, there were 78.2 males.

The median income for a household in the town was $30,486, and the median income for a family was $36,484. Males had a median income of $31,250 versus $20,250 for females. The per capita income for the town was $15,609. About 9.1% of families and 14.9% of the population were below the poverty line, including 29.5% of those under age 18 and 13.6% of those age 65 or over.

== Churches ==
Bradford is home to six churches which operate within the city limits as of May 2018. First Baptist Church and Beech Grove Missionary Baptist Church are the two Baptist congregations in town. Bradford Church of Christ is the town's lone Church of Christ, operating on Front Street. Bradford Cumberland Presbyterian Church is located on the old Highway 45 across from the school. Apostolic Faith is a Pentecostal church located near the northern city limits. Steveslavachiken Church is located in the northeastern part of the town. There is no Methodist Church operating in Bradford since the closing of Bradford United Methodist Church in April 2018.

== Education ==
Bradford is served by the Bradford Special School District. A "Special School District" is defined as a district independently run by the district itself, instead of by a county school system. In the late 1970s, consolidation in the area threatened to combine Bradford into the Gibson County Special School District, which was being formed at the time by other smaller towns in Gibson County, but the city voted to retain their own high school, and thus the Bradford Special School District was formed.

All schools in Bradford are located on one campus. The buildings are separated with Bradford Elementary School located on the southeastern side of the campus, and Bradford Junior-Senior High School located on the western side of the campus.

There are no colleges or universities in Bradford. The only college with a campus in Gibson County is the Dyersburg State Community College satellite campus in Trenton, approximately 10 miles (16 km) away. The closest colleges are the University of Tennessee at Martin (located in Martin to the north), Bethel University (located in McKenzie to the Northeast), as well as several colleges and universities in Jackson, Tennessee (located to the south).

== Athletics ==
Bradford is the home of the Bradford Lady Red Devils basketball team, which have won six state championship titles in Tennessee Class A Girls' Basketball (1982, 1993, 1996, 1997, 1998, and 2000). The Lady Red Devils represent Bradford High School of the Bradford Special School District.

== Media ==
=== Radio stations ===
- WTPR-AM 710 "The Greatest Hits of All Time"
