= Greenfield, Tennessee =

- City
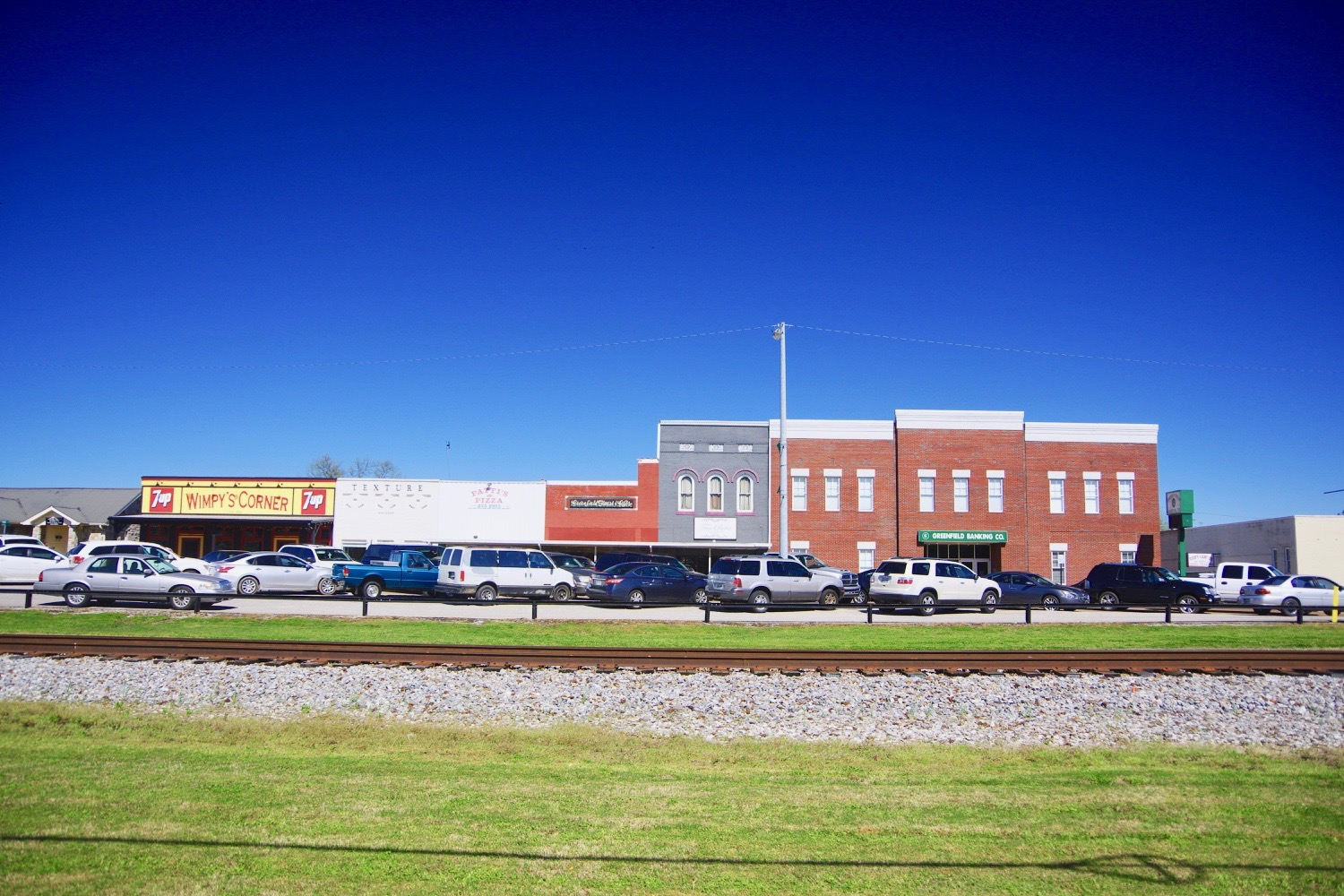
- Front Street

- Location of Greenfield in Weakley County, Tennessee.
- Coordinates: 36°9′25″N 88°48′5″W
- Country: United States
- State: Tennessee
- County: Weakley

Area
  - Total: 3.49 sq mi (9.05 km^{2})
  - Land: 3.48 sq mi (9.01 km^{2})
  - Water: 0.015 sq mi (0.04 km^{2})
- Elevation: 433 ft (132 m)

Population (2020)
  - Total: 2,031
  - Density: 584.0/sq mi (225.49/km^{2})
- Time zone: UTC-6 (Central (CST))
  - Summer (DST): UTC-5 (CDT)
- ZIP code: 38230
- Area code: 731
- FIPS code: 47-31000
- GNIS feature ID: 1286165
- Website: City website

Greenfield is a city in Weakley County, Tennessee, United States. As of the 2020 census, Greenfield had a population of 2,031. The population was 2,078 in 2018.

== Geography ==
Greenfield is located at 36°9′25″N 88°48′5″W (36.156875, -88.801290).

According to the United States Census Bureau, the city has a total area of 3.6 square miles (9.3 km^{2}), of which 3.6 square miles (9.3 km^{2}) is land and 0.04 square miles (0.10 km^{2}) (0.55%) is water.

== Demographics ==
Historical population
Census	Pop.	Note	%±
1880	320		—
1890	801		150.3%
1910	1,516		—
1920	1,474		−2.8%
1930	1,429		−3.1%
1940	1,509		5.6%
1950	1,706		13.1%
1960	1,779		4.3%
1970	2,050		15.2%
1980	2,109		2.9%
1990	2,105		−0.2%
2000	2,208		4.9%
2010	2,182		−1.2%
2020	2,031		−6.9%

=== 2020 census ===
As of the 2020 census, there was a population of 2,031, with 872 households and 600 families residing in the city.

The median age was 40.9 years. 22.6% of residents were under the age of 18 and 19.9% of residents were 65 years of age or older. For every 100 females there were 83.6 males, and for every 100 females age 18 and over there were 80.6 males age 18 and over.

0.0% of residents lived in urban areas, while 100.0% lived in rural areas.

Of the 872 households, 29.8% had children under the age of 18 living in them. Of all households, 40.8% were married-couple households, 16.5% were households with a male householder and no spouse or partner present, and 36.0% were households with a female householder and no spouse or partner present. About 31.5% of all households were made up of individuals and 14.6% had someone living alone who was 65 years of age or older.

There were 977 housing units, of which 10.7% were vacant. The homeowner vacancy rate was 1.2% and the rental vacancy rate was 9.9%.

Racial composition as of the 2020 census
Race	Number	Percent
White	1,792	88.2%
Black or African American	147	7.2%
American Indian and Alaska Native	9	0.4%
Asian	1	0.0%
Native Hawaiian and Other Pacific Islander	0	0.0%
Some other race	12	0.6%
Two or more races	70	3.4%
Hispanic or Latino (of any race)	34	1.7%

=== 2000 census ===
As of the census of 2000, there was a population of 2,208, with 925 households and 624 families residing in the city. The population density was 611.6 inhabitants per square mile (236.1/km^{2}). There were 1,007 housing units at an average density of 278.9 per square mile (107.7/km^{2}). The racial makeup of the city was 90.49% White, 8.56% African American, 0.36% Native American, 0.05% Asian, 0.05% from other races, and 0.50% from two or more races. Hispanic or Latino of any race were 0.50% of the population.

There were 925 households, out of which 30.6% had children under the age of 18 living with them, 49.9% were married couples living together, 14.5% had a female householder with no husband present, and 32.5% were non-families. 30.1% of all households were made up of individuals, and 16.3% had someone living alone who was 65 years of age or older. The average household size was 2.39 and the average family size was 2.95.

In the city, the population was spread out, with 24.7% under the age of 18, 8.8% from 18 to 24, 28.1% from 25 to 44, 21.7% from 45 to 64, and 16.6% who were 65 years of age or older. The median age was 37 years. For every 100 females, there were 85.5 males. For every 100 females age 18 and over, there were 81.0 males.

The median income for a household in the city was $26,380, and the median income for a family was $35,417. Males had a median income of $27,153 versus $19,507 for females. The per capita income for the city was $14,215. About 12.7% of families and 14.7% of the population were below the poverty line, including 21.3% of those under age 18 and 13.7% of those age 65 or over.

== Notable people ==
Tandy Darby - Member of the Tennessee House of Representatives, representing Tennessee's 76th House District

== Media ==
- WWGY 99.3 "Today's Best Music with "Ace & TJ in the Morning"
- WRQR-FM 105.5 "Today's Best Music with "Ace & TJ in the Morning"
- WTPR-AM 710 "The Greatest Hits of All Time"

== See also ==
- List of cities in Tennessee
