= Van Zandt =

Van Zandt, van Zandt or Vanzandt, is a surname of Dutch origin.

Van Zandt or its variants may refer to:

== People ==
- Van Zandt Williams (1916–1966), President of the Optical Society of America and Director of the American Institute of Physics
- Billy Van Zandt (born 1957), American playwright and actor
- Brooklyn Van Zandt (born 2006), American singer-songwriter and former contestant of Dream Academy: The Debut
- Caitlin Van Zandt (born 1985), American actress
- David E. Van Zandt, American academic administrator
- Charles C. Van Zandt (1830–1894), Governor of Rhode Island
- Ike Van Zandt (1876–1908), American Major League Baseball player
- Isaac Van Zandt (1813–1847), a political leader of the Republic of Texas
- James E. Van Zandt (1896–1986), U.S. Congressman from Pennsylvania
- John Van Zandt (died 1847), American anti-slavery activist
- K. M. Van Zandt (1836–1930), ninth Commander-in-Chief of the United Confederate Veterans
- Lindsey VanZandt (born 1993), American mixed martial arts (MMA) fighter
- Lonnie Lee Van Zandt (1937–1995), American physicist and educator
- Marie van Zandt (1858–1919), American soprano opera singer
- Maureen Van Zandt, actress and wife of Steven
- Philip Van Zandt (1904–1958), Dutch actor
- Rick van Zandt, American musician (Metal Church)
- Steven Van Zandt (born Steven Lento in 1950), American musician and actor
- Tim Van Zandt (born 1963), American politician from Missouri
- Townes Van Zandt (1944–1997), country music songwriter

== Fictional characters ==
- Danny Van Zandt, in Degrassi: The Next Generation
- Liberty Van Zandt, in Degrassi: The Next Generation

== Places ==
- Van Zandt, Washington
- Van Zandt County, Texas, United States
- Vanzant, Kentucky
- Van Sandt Covered Bridge, bridge in Bucks County, Pennsylvania

== See also ==
- Van Sant (disambiguation)
- Vansant (disambiguation)
- Van Zant (disambiguation)
