= Christmasville, Tennessee =

Christmasville, Tennessee may refer to the following places in Tennessee:

- Christmasville, Carroll County, Tennessee
- Christmasville, Haywood County, Tennessee
