= Christmasville =

Christmasville may refer to:

- Christmasville, Carroll County, Tennessee, an unincorporated community
- Christmasville, Haywood County, Tennessee, an unincorporated community
- Christmasville (album), 2008, by Mannheim Steamroller

== See also ==
- Christmas Town USA, an annual event in McAdenville, North Carolina
- Christmas Town: A Busch Gardens Celebration, an annual event near Williamsburg, Virginia
