= Vansant =

Vansant or VanSant may refer to:

== Places ==
- Vansant, Virginia (pop. 989 in 2000), a census-designated place in Buchanan County, Virginia, U.S.
- Vansant Airport (aka Van Sant Airport), in Bucks County, Pennsylvania, U.S.
- John C. Vansant House, in the National Register of Historic Places listings in Delaware
- Vansant Circus, a fictional employer of comics superhero The Moth

== People ==
- Bob Vansant (born 1954), Flemish-Belgian psychotherapist
- Charles Vansant, first victim of the Jersey Shore shark attacks of 1916
- Henry Vansant, a coach for the Lenoir–Rhyne University Bears from 1980 to 1983
- J. R. Vansant, eponym of William Gaddis's 1975 novel J R

== See also ==
- Vansant v. Gas-Light Company, a 1875 U. S. Supreme Court case
- Van (Dutch)
- Van Sant (disambiguation)
- Van Zandt
- Van Zant (disambiguation)
