= John C. McLemore =

American land speculator (1790–1864)

John Christmas McLemore
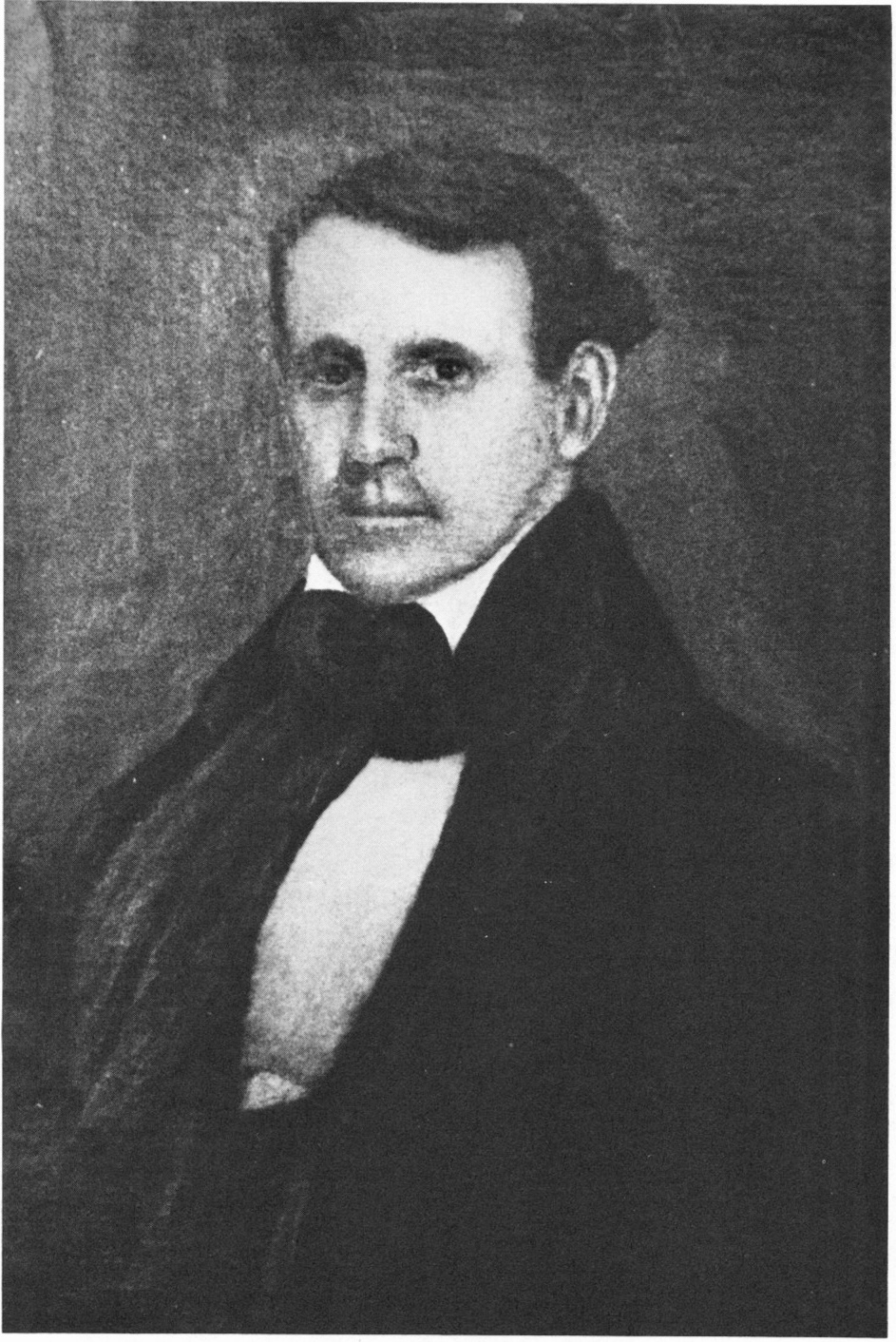
- Born: January 1, 1790; North Carolina
- Died: May 20, 1864 (aged 74); Tennessee

John Christmas McLemore (January 1, 1790–May 20, 1864) was an American surveyor, real estate investor, and land speculator active in 19th-century Tennessee.

== Biography ==
McLemore's uncle, Colonel William Christmas, died in 1811, and McLemore was appointed to replace him as surveyor of the North Carolina Military District. As described in an 1869 capsule biography, "John C. McLemore came from North Carolina, was a clerk in the office of the Land Register, and succeeded Robert Searcy as Register. He was the largest dealer in lands in the State of Tennessee. He was exceedingly popular throughout Middle and West Tennessee. After an eventful career, he finally died in poverty, in Memphis, only two or three years since."

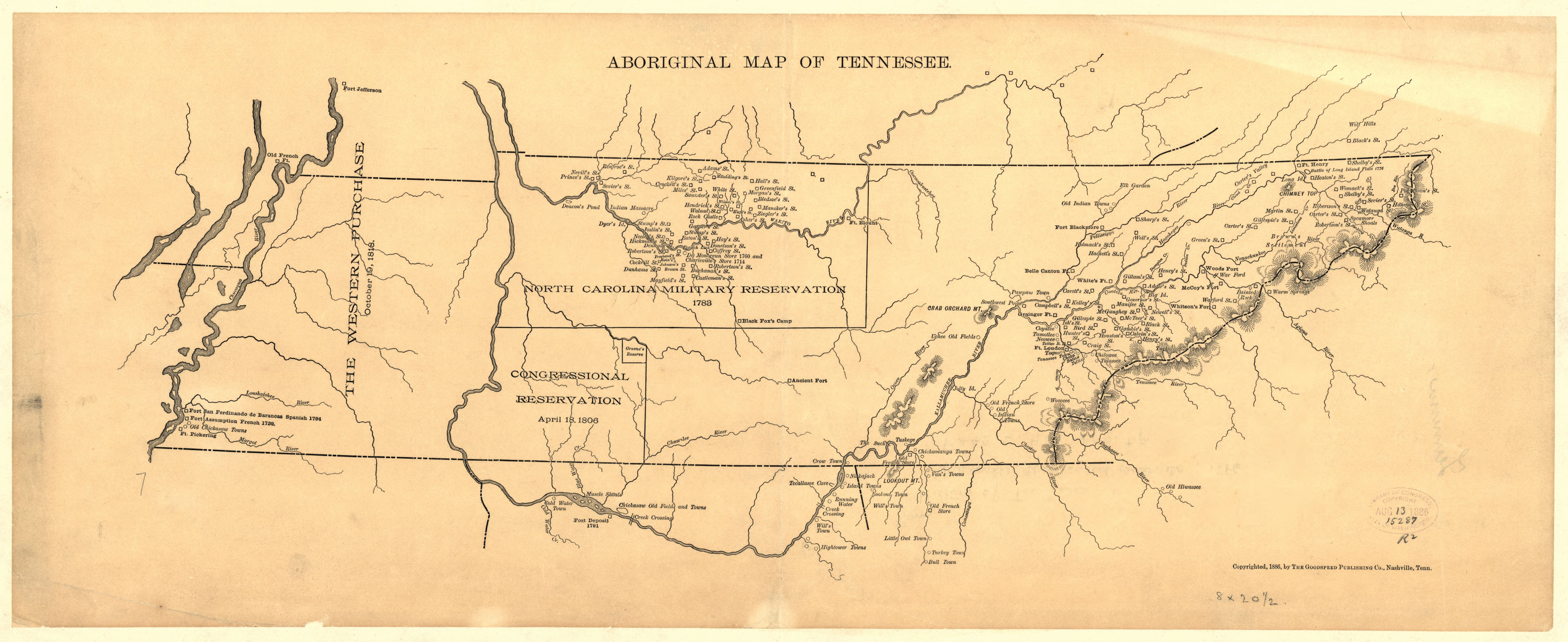
"Aboriginal map of Tennessee" showing the North Carolina Military Reservation

He married Elizabeth Donelson, a daughter of Mary Purnell and John Donelson II, in 1815. Among her many aunts and uncles were Rachel and Andrew Jackson. This yielded John Coffee, Andrew Jackson Donelson, and Capt. Jack Donelson as brothers-in-law. Future acting First Lady Emily Tennessee Donelson was a sister-in-law. McLemore was active in the Nashville Masonic Lodge.

McLemore was said to be "one of Jackson's most intimate friends in Nashville." He served as a Kitchen Cabinet-adjacent political advisor, writing in 1830 that Tennesseans were becoming upset with the irregular behavior of Jackson's Cabinet officers including the Eaton Affair, but so long as William Carroll did not publicly turn against Jackson, things could be kept in hand.

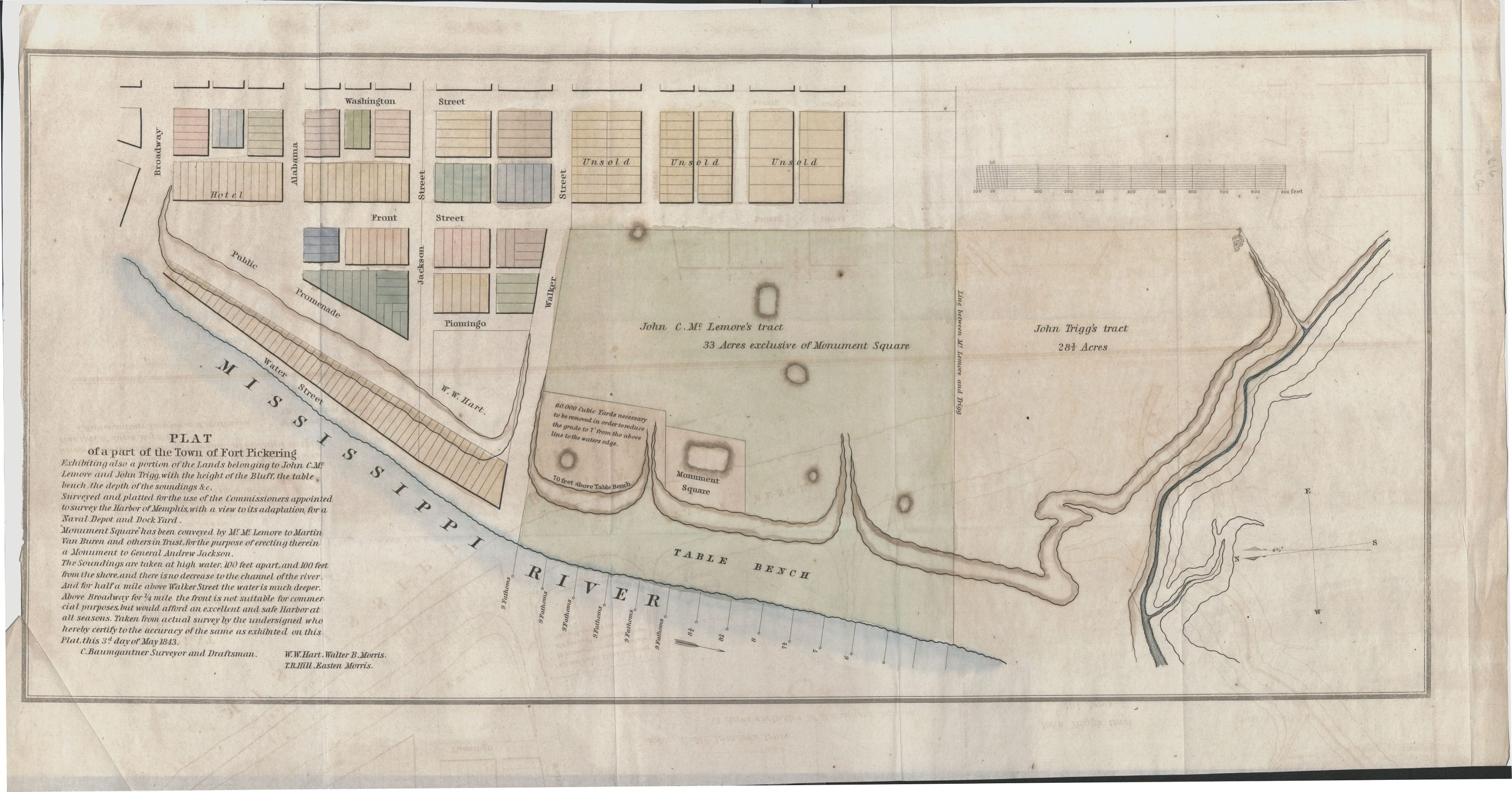
Plat map of Fort Pickering, Tennessee (1843), showing McLemore parcel

As a land speculator, "He invested in the ventures of others as in [John] Coffee's Florence project and as in early Memphis development, and he put time and money into his own town plans, as in Fort Pickering and Christmasville. He profited greatly and lost heavily, but he certainly contributed to the development of West Tennessee between 1818 and 1845."

== See also ==
- Donelson family
- Andrew Jackson and land speculation

== Sources ==
- Downing, Marvin (Fall 1983). "John Christmas McLemore: 19th Century Tennessee Land Speculator". Tennessee Historical Quarterly. 42 (3): 254–265. ISSN 0040-3261.
- Jackson, Andrew (1980). Smith, Sam; Owsley, Harriet (eds.). The Papers of Andrew Jackson: Volume I, 1770–1803. University of Tennessee Press. doi:10.7290/utp7943. ISBN 978-0-87049-219-8.
- Moore, Powell (January 1932). "The Political Background of the Revolt Against Jackson in Tennessee". East Tennessee Historical Society's Publications. 28. Tennessee Historical Commission, University of Tennessee. Knoxville, Tennessee: East Tennessee Historical Society: 45–66. ISSN 0361-6193. OCLC 1137265. FHL 1640746.
- Nelson, Anson (Summer 2015). "Distinguished Nashville Masons of 1818 [orig. pub. 1869]" (PDF). Middle Tennessee Journal of Genealogy & History. XXIX (1): 30–33.
