= Stephen D. Lee =

American politician and Confederate general

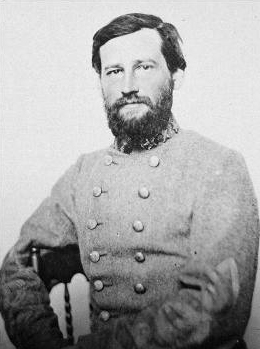
- Lee in uniform, c. 1862
- Born: Stephen Dill Lee; September 22, 1833; Charleston, South Carolina, U.S.
- Died: May 28, 1908 (aged 74); Vicksburg, Mississippi U.S.
- Burial place: Friendship Cemetery, Columbus, Mississippi U.S.
- Alma mater: United States Military Academy
- Spouse: Regina Harrison
- Children: 1
- Military career
- Allegiance: United States; Confederate States
- Branch: United States Army; Confederate States Army
- Service years: 1854–1861 (U.S.); 1861–1865 (C.S.)
- Rank: First Lieutenant (USA); Lieutenant General (CSA)
- Commands: Second Corps, Army of Tennessee
- Conflicts: American Civil War

Signature
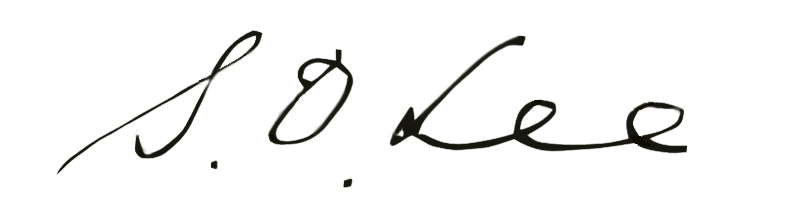

Stephen Dill Lee (September 22, 1833 – May 28, 1908) was a Confederate general, politician, and first president of Mississippi State University from 1880 to 1899. He served as lieutenant general of the Confederate States Army in the Eastern and Western theaters of the American Civil War.

== Early life and education ==
Stephen Dill Lee was born in Charleston, South Carolina on September 22, 1833, the son of Thomas Lee and his wife Caroline Allison. Lee was raised in Abbeville, South Carolina. He possibly volunteered for service with the United States Army during the Mexican–American War. Lee entered the United States Military Academy in 1850, graduating four years later the 17th out of 46 cadets.

On July 1, 1854, Lee was commissioned a second lieutenant in the 4th Infantry Regiment. Lee was promoted to first lieutenant on October 31, 1856. He served as the regiment's quartermaster from September 18, 1857, to February 8, 1861. He was an adjutant of Florida as well as his regiment's quartermaster in 1857 during the Seminole Wars. From 1858 to 1861, he was assigned to the western frontier, posted in the Kansas Territory and then in the newly created Dakota Territory. Lee then resigned his U.S. Army commission twelve days later to join the Confederate States Army.

== American Civil War ==
On March 6, he was assigned as the assistant adjutant general and assistant inspector general of the Forces at Charleston. On March 16, he was appointed a captain in the Regular Confederate States Artillery. Beginning on April 11, Lee was aide-de-camp to Brig. Gen. P. G. T. Beauregard. That same day, he delivered an ultimatum from Beauregard to U.S. Maj. Robert Anderson, demanding the evacuation of Fort Sumter, which was refused, and after Battle of Fort Sumter, the fort fell on April 14, precipitating the start of the Civil War. According to Carl Sandburg (Abraham Lincoln, vol. 3, pp. 208–209), Captain Lee and three other men with full power from Beauregard to decide what to answer Anderson heard him say he would be starved out in a few days. Anderson offered to "evacuate Fort Sumter in 3 days and avoid the useless effusion of blood." They could have taken Anderson's reply back to Beauregard and have it telegraphed to Jefferson Davis to see if they would wait three days more to see if Anderson would surrender after his food was gone. "It seemed almost as though the 4 men had decided before they came what they would say, which was: "Beauregard will open fire on Fort Sumter in one hour from this time." This probably was not, as it seems, the last opportunity to avoid war because "Sumter was a symbol, a Chip on the Shoulder." It was "framed" by Lincoln, and the South was eager to meet the challenge. (ibid, p. 206) Sandburg calls this war "the Second American Revolution." (ibid, p. vii, p. 26). In the end, Lee cleared South Carolina Confederate soldiers to fire upon the fort, effectively beginning the Civil War.

When Beauregard received permission to organize two regular artillery companies on May 11, Lee was assigned to command one; the other went to Capt. Charles Sidney Winder. Lee's company was assigned to Castle Pinckney until May 30, when it was sent to Fort Palmetto on Cole's Island, arriving June 1.

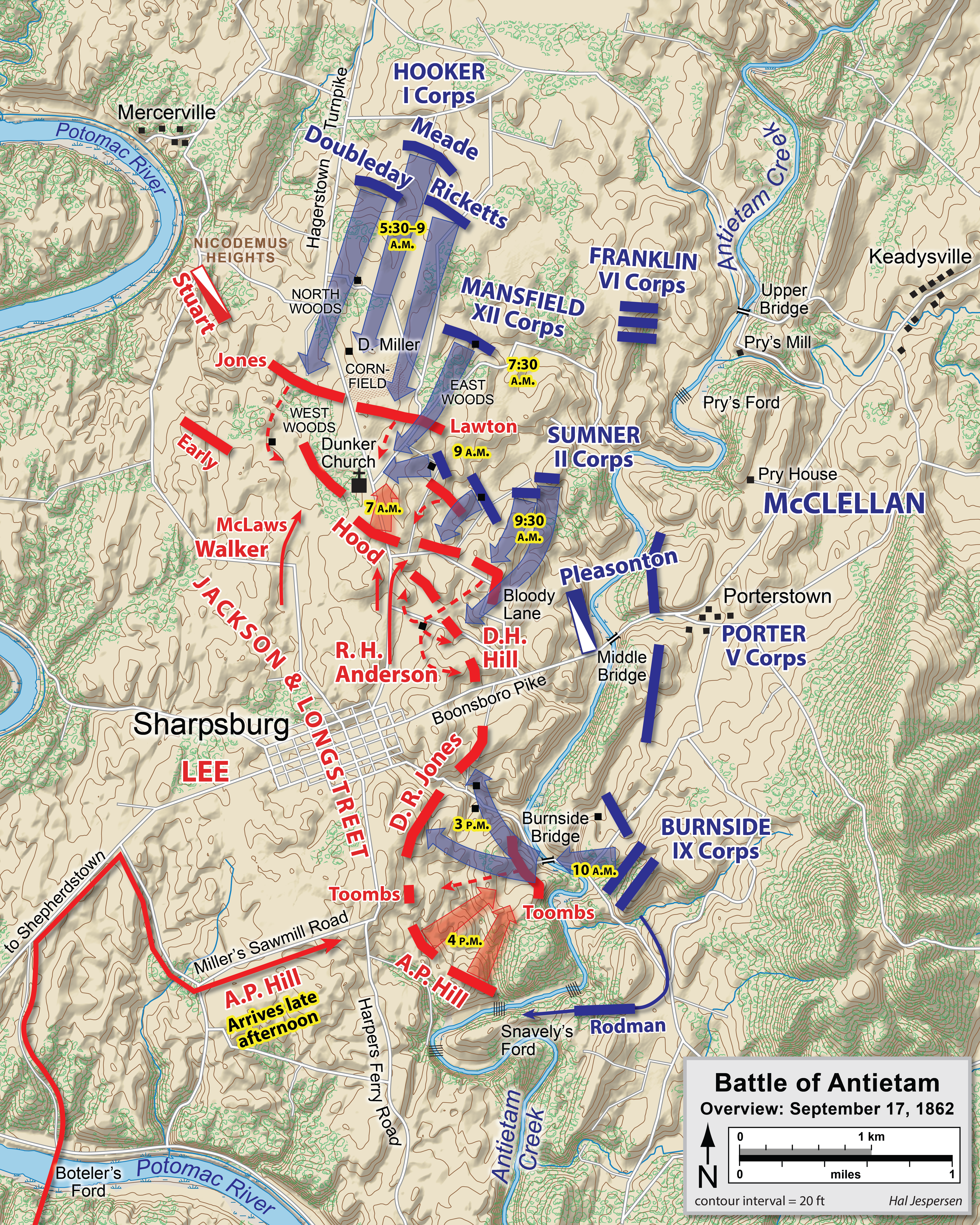
Map of the Battle of Antietam

In June 1861, Lee resumed his position in the South Carolina Militia, and then in November, he was promoted to the rank of major in the Confederate Army. Lee commanded a light battery in Hampton's Legion in Gen. Joseph E. Johnston's army later in 1861. He was promoted to lieutenant colonel in March 1862 and was the artillery chief for Maj. Gen. Lafayette McLaws's division of the Army of Northern Virginia from April to June 17, and then in the same role under Brig. Gen. John B. Magruder until July.

Lee participated in the 1862 Peninsula Campaign, notably during the Battle of Seven Pines on May 31 and June 1, the Battle of Savage's Station on June 29, during the Seven Days Battles from June 25 to July 1, and the Battle of Malvern Hill also on July 1. He briefly served in the 4th Virginia Cavalry in July, was promoted to colonel on July 9, and assumed command of an artillery battalion of Maj. Gen. James Longstreet's Corps that same month. Under Longstreet, Lee fought in the Second Battle of Manassas that August and then Battle of Antietam on September 17, where his guns played a prominent role in defending the ground near the famed Dunker Church. The following is a summary of Lee's involvement at Sharpsburg:

...he deployed late on the 15th on the West side of Antietam Creek. He exchanged fire with the U.S. batteries [across] the creek on the 16th the fight becoming more intense as sundown approached. On the morning of the 17th he positioned his batteries on the high ground near the Dunkard Church, and was heavily engaged against the assaults of the U.S. I and XII Corps through the Cornfield and to the West Woods. About 10 am, he was ordered to the vicinity of Sharpsburg in the face of Burnside's afternoon drive from the Lower Bridge and was furiously engaged there as well.

On November 6, 1862, Lee was promoted to the rank of brigadier general. Leaving the artillery branch, Lee briefly led an infantry division during the Battle of Chickasaw Bayou from December 26–29, where he repulsed the attacks of U.S. Maj. Gen. William Tecumseh Sherman. Beginning in January 1863, he led a brigade in the Department of Mississippi & Eastern Louisiana until that May when he was ordered to take command of Lt. Gen. John C. Pemberton's artillery defending access to the Mississippi River at Vicksburg, Mississippi. Lee fought notably during the Battle of Champion Hill on May 16, where he was wounded in the shoulder. Military historian Jon L. Wakelyn praises Lee's performance in this action, saying, "he was the hero of the battle of Champion Hills."

Lee served throughout the 1863 Siege of Vicksburg until Pemberton's surrender to Maj. Gen. Ulysses S. Grant on July 4, becoming a prisoner of war. While on parole, he was promoted to the rank of major general on August 3, 1863. Beginning on August 16, Lee was assigned to command the Department of Mississippi & Eastern Louisiana cavalry, and he was officially exchanged on October 13. During that time, General Joseph E. Johnston sent Lee's small cavalry force of 2,500 men to Tennessee to reinforce General Braxton Bragg, who was beginning to lay siege to Chattanooga. Lee rode from northern Mississippi into northern Alabama, where he met Confederate cavalry commander Joseph Wheeler who had just conducted a raid through central Tennessee and convinced Lee his plans would be hopeless against the great number of U.S. soldiers in the region.

Lee was then given command of the Department of Alabama & East Louisiana on May 9, 1864. Troops in Lee's department under Maj. Gen. Nathan B. Forrest scored a victory at the Battle of Brice's Crossroads on June 10 and seriously threatened U.S. supply lines supporting Sherman in Georgia. Lee personally reinforced Forrest, but the combined Confederate force was defeated at the Battle of Tupelo, ensuring the safety of Sherman's supply lines.

Lee was promoted to lieutenant general on June 23, 1864, making Lee the youngest at this grade in the Confederate States Army. On July 26 he was assigned to lead the Second Corps, Army of Tennessee, commanded by John Bell Hood. During the Atlanta campaign, Lee fought at the Battle of Ezra Church on July 28 and was in command of the extended line in southwest Atlanta in August 1864. His troops, with the attachment of William B. Bate's Division and a Brigade of Georgia militia, defeated Schofield's movement to break the railroad lines at East Point at the Battle of Utoy Creek. For this action, he published a general order recognizing Bate's Division for defeating the attack of the combined U.S. XXIII Corps and XIV Corps. He also commanded his corps at the Battle of Jonesborough on August 31 and September 1. Lee fought in the Franklin-Nashville Campaign and was severely wounded in the foot at the Battle of Spring Hill on November 29, but did not give up the command until an organized rearguard took over the post of danger. Regarding the confused and disappointing fight at Spring Hill, Lee considered it "one of the most disgraceful and lamentable occurrences of the war, one that is in my opinion unpardonable." He then participated in the Battle of Franklin on November 30. Lee's men arrived at Franklin at 4:00 pm with orders from Hood to support Benjamin F. Cheatham's force if necessary. Meeting with Cheatham, Lee decided the situation was dire and attacked at 9:00 pm, taking serious losses from the U.S. position and Confederate artillery. Following the campaign's Battle of Nashville on December 15–16, Lee kept his troops closed up and well in hand despite the general rout of the rest of the Confederate forces. For three consecutive days, they would form the fighting rearguard of the otherwise disintegrated Army of Tennessee. Lee was wounded in the foot by shell fragments on December 17.

Upon recovery, Lee joined Gen. Joseph E. Johnston during the 1865 Carolinas campaign. On February 9, he married Regina Harrison, with whom he had one child, a son named Blewett Harrison Lee. When the remnants of Johnston's Army of Tennessee was reorganized in early 1865, Lee was left without a command matching his rank, and his commission as a lieutenant general was canceled on February 23; however, on March 23 he was appointed a "temporary" lieutenant general. Lee surrendered at that rank with Johnston's forces in April and was paroled on May 1.

== Later life ==
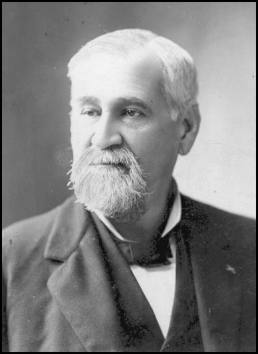
Lee in later life

After the war, Lee settled in Columbus, Mississippi, his wife's home state, and his own territorial command during the greater part of the war; there, he devoted himself to planting. He served in the Mississippi State Senate in 1878 and was the first president of the Agricultural and Mechanical College of Mississippi from 1880 to 1899. The school was established under his leadership as a segregated institution. Lee was a delegate to the Mississippi Constitutional Convention of 1890. Michael Newton states, "The convention's final product, imposed on Mississippi without a popular vote, established a two-dollar poll tax, mandated two years' residency in the state and one year in the would-be voter's district, and denied ballots to convicted felons or tax-defaulters. Section 244 further required that any voter must "be able to read any section of the constitution of this State; or he shall be able to understand the same when read to him, or give a reasonable interpretation thereof." The net effect, by 1892, was to remove 138,400 blacks and 52,000 whites from the state's electoral rolls." The official constitutional record of the 1890 convention reads that "It is the manifest intention of this Convention to secure to the State of Mississippi 'white supremacy'". In 1895 Lee was the first chairman of the Vicksburg National Park Association and was instrumental in the congressional passage of the law creating the national park in 1899. He also was an active member (and from 1904 commander-in-chief) of the United Confederate Veterans society. On March 2, 1900, Lee was president of the Mississippi Historical Society who, under an act of the state legislature of that date, was given authority to appoint the Mississippi Historical Commission, a forerunner of the state agency to act as custodian of the official records and historical materials of the state. In 1902, Lee became a trustee of the Mississippi Department of Archives and History.

In 1887 Lee wrote an article for the first volume of Battles and Leaders of the Civil War, and published Sherman's Meridian Expedition and Sooy Smith's Raid to West Point in 1880. Lee died in 1908 in Vicksburg, Mississippi, and was buried in Friendship Cemetery located in Columbus. He fell sick after giving a speech to former U.S. soldiers from Wisconsin and Iowa, four of the regiments whom he had faced in battle 45 years earlier at Vicksburg. The cause of his death was attributed to a cerebral hemorrhage. At the time, Lee was also planning the next reunion of the United Confederate Veterans, held on June 9, 1908.

== Legacy ==
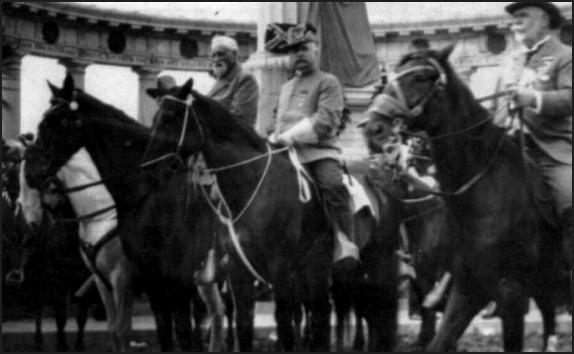
Lee (left), commander-in-chief of the United Confederate Veterans

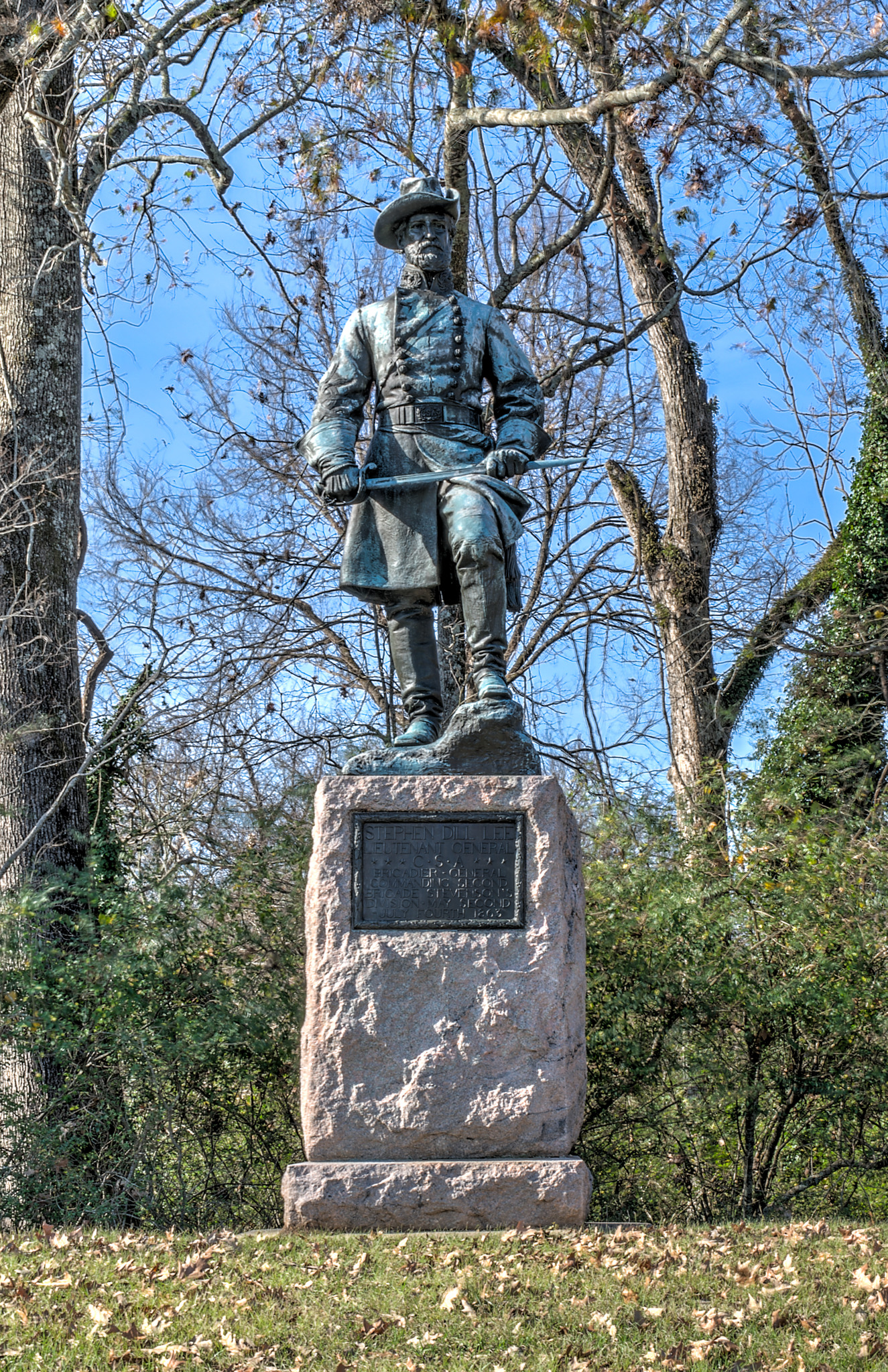
Statue of Lee by H.H. Kitson at Vicksburg National Military Park

Based on Lee's familiarity with the three major arms of a Civil War-era army, military historian Ezra J. Warner summarized him as an able and versatile corps commander, writing: "Despite his youth and comparative lack of experience, Lee's prior close acquaintanceship with all three branches of the service – artillery, cavalry, and infantry – rendered him one of the most capable corps commanders in the army." He was entered into the Mississippi Hall of Fame.

Lee is also memorialized with a statue by Henry Hudson Kitson in the Vicksburg National Military Park dedicated in 1909, as well busts in the center of the Drill Field at Mississippi State University and Friendship Cemetery in Columbus. Lee Hall at Mississippi State University is also named in his honor. Some colleagues have called him 'the father of industrial education in the South'. The Lt. Gen. Stephen D. Lee Camp No. 545 of the Sons of Confederate Veterans in Vicksburg, the Stephen D. Lee's Caledonia Rifles Camp No. 2140 in Caledonia and the Captain Stephen D. Lee Chapter No. 301 of the Military Order of the Stars and Bars in Charleston, SC were named in his honor.

On April 25, 1906, in a speech given in New Orleans, Louisiana, Lee gave the following charge to the Sons of Confederate Veterans:

To you, Sons of Confederate Veterans, we will commit the vindication of the cause for which we fought. To your strength will be given the defense of the Confederate soldier's good name, the guardianship of his history, the emulation of his virtues, the perpetuation of those principles which he loved and which you love also, and those ideals which made him glorious and which you also cherish.

Lee not only promoted the Lost Cause narrative of Southern motivations for secession in public, but as chairman of the United Confederate Veterans' Historical Committee, he also worked to ensure it was taught in Southern schools. Lee was also unabashedly racist. In a speech at the Columbus courthouse on June 15, 1889, Lee stated, "The question of white supremacy is no issue. That battle has been fought some time ago and won, that the white people should rule, not this State alone but the whole South." Lee advocated for white women's suffrage in Mississippi, but historians argue that this was mostly to ensure the continuation of white domination of the vote. Hattaway quotes Lee on this issue: "We must retain our representation in Congress and the electoral college. We either submit to negro rule, adopt the shotgun policy or change our franchise laws." Elsewhere, Lee is recorded as stating, "Let us not fool ourselves. We know that the negro appreciates, and is proud of, his right to vote. He will undertake more trouble, and go further, to exercise this privilege than the white man". Believing that the U.S. Congress would insist on the right of black citizens to vote, Lee's solution was not to outright deny the black male citizen the vote – although he did also promote the Jim Crow laws of the 1890 convention – instead he sought to ensure that the white citizens would always outvote the black citizens of the South by granting the taxpaying white women the right to vote as well.

== See also ==
- List of American Civil War generals
- List of commanders-in-chief of the United Confederate Veterans
- List of people from Charleston, South Carolina
- John Bell Hood, youngest Confederate full general.

== Footnotes ==
Academic offices
New office	President of Mississippi State University; 1880–1899	Succeeded by John M. Stone
Non-profit organization positions
Preceded by Robert Lowry	President of The Mississippi Historical Society; 1898–1908	Succeeded by R. W. Jones
