= Van Zant =

Van Zant or VanZant or Vanzant may refer to:

== People ==
- Charles Van Zant (born 1943), American politician
- Dennis Van Zant (born 1952), American basketball player
- Dick Van Zant (1864–1912), American baseball player
- Iyanla Vanzant (born 1953), American author and inspirational speaker
- Jimmie Van Zant (1956–2016), American singer-songwriter
- Paige VanZant (born 1994), American mixed martial artist
- Shawn Vanzant (born 1988), American basketball player
- Van Zant (band), an American music duo and family of musicians
  - Johnny Van Zant (born 1960), American musician, member of Lynyrd Skynyrd
  - Ronnie Van Zant (1948–1977), American musician, member of Lynyrd Skynyrd
  - Donnie Van Zant (born 1952), American musician, member of .38 Special

== Places ==
- Vanzant, Kentucky, an unincorporated community in the United States
- Vanzant, Missouri, an unincorporated community in the United States

== See also ==
- Vansant (disambiguation)
- Van Sant (disambiguation)
- Van Zandt (disambiguation)
