= Van Sant =

Van Sant may refer to:

== People ==
- Van Sant (surname)

== Places ==
- Van Sant Airport, airport in Bucks County, Pennsylvania
- Van Sandt Covered Bridge, bridge in Bucks County, Pennsylvania

== See also ==
- Van (Dutch)
- Van Zandt
- Van Zant (disambiguation)
- Vansant (disambiguation)
