= Emerson Etheridge =

American politician (1819–1902)

Henry Emerson Etheridge
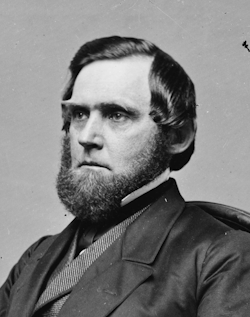

Member of the U.S. House of Representatives from Tennessee's 9th district
- In office March 4, 1853 – March 3, 1857
- Preceded by: Isham G. Harris
- Succeeded by: John D.C. Atkins
- In office March 4, 1859 – March 3, 1861
- Preceded by: John D.C. Atkins
- Succeeded by: Barbour Lewis

Clerk of the United States House of Representatives
- In office July 1861 – December 1863
- Speaker: Galusha A. Grow
- Preceded by: John W. Forney
- Succeeded by: Edward McPherson

Member of the Tennessee Senate
- In office 1869–1871

Member of the Tennessee House of Representatives
- In office 1845–1847

Personal details
- Born: September 28, 1819 Currituck County, North Carolina, U.S.
- Died: October 21, 1902 (aged 83) Dresden, Tennessee, U.S.
- Resting place: Mount Vernon Cemetery; Sharon, Tennessee, U.S.
- Party: Whig; Know Nothing; Opposition
- Spouse: Fannie N. Bell Etheridge
- Children: Emma Etheridge Moran, Bell W. Etheridge
- Profession: Attorney

Henry Emerson Etheridge (September 28, 1819 – October 21, 1902) was an American politician and a member of the United States House of Representatives for Tennessee's 9th congressional district from 1853 to 1857, and again from 1859 to 1861. He also served one term in the Tennessee House of Representatives (1845–1847) and one term in the Tennessee Senate (1869–1871). After Tennessee seceded in 1861, he was elected Clerk of the United States House of Representatives, serving until 1863.

One of the most powerful and eloquent speakers of his day, Etheridge was one of the few Southern congressmen to oppose the expansion of slavery and denounce Southern secession on the eve of the Civil War. Though a Southern Unionist, he criticized Abraham Lincoln over the Emancipation Proclamation. In the years following the war, Etheridge was a bitter critic of Governor William G. Brownlow, and ran against Brownlow for governor in a violent campaign in 1867.

After leaving the state senate in 1871, Etheridge remained active in state Republican Party politics. He was offered (but rejected) the party's nomination for governor in 1878, and ran unsuccessfully for Congress in 1884. He worked as the Surveyor of Customs at Memphis in the early 1890s.

== Early life ==
Etheridge was born in Currituck County, North Carolina, the son of Thomas and Elizabeth (Harvey) Etheridge. In the early 1830s, he moved with his parents to Weakley County, Tennessee, where they settled on a 1,000-acre (400 ha) farm near the community of Sharon. Though initially a teacher, he studied law and was admitted to the bar in 1840. He married Fannie N. Bell and they had three children: a son (Bell Etheridge), a daughter (Emma Etheridge Moran), and a third child who died in infancy in 1854.

Inspired by Kentucky politician Henry Clay, Etheridge became active in Whig Party politics. He was appointed Clerk of the Tennessee House of Representatives in 1843 and was elected to Weakley's seat in the Tennessee House in 1845. After his term ended in 1847, he resumed the practice of law in Dresden.

== Congress ==
The Whig Party gained control of the Tennessee state legislature in 1850 and redrew the state's congressional districts, effectively gerrymandering the 9th district incumbent, Democrat Isham G. Harris, out of office. Etheridge sought the open seat, and running virtually unopposed, was easily elected to the Thirty-third Congress in 1853. Etheridge entered Congress at a time of growing sectional tension between the North and South over the issue of slavery. Though not opposed to slavery, Etheridge rejected its expansion into new territories. He was one of nine Southern representatives to vote against the Kansas-Nebraska Act in 1854, his main concern being the act's repeal of the Missouri Compromise.

Following the collapse of the Whig Party in the mid-1850s, Etheridge, like many Tennessee Whigs, joined the nativist American ("Know Nothing") Party. Assailed for his vote against the Kansas-Nebraska Act, he was nearly defeated for reelection in 1855, edging his Democratic challenger, Thomas J. Freeman, by just over 500 votes with more than 15,000 cast. Etheridge was the only Southern representative to support an 1857 House resolution condemning the repeal of the Missouri Compromise. In February 1857, Etheridge spoke in opposition to the reopening of the African slave trade, calling any such proposition "shocking to the moral sentiment of the enlightened portion of mankind."

Following a bitter reelection campaign in 1857, Etheridge was defeated by the Democratic challenger, J.D.C. Atkins, by just 129 votes. Joining fellow Southern ex-Whigs in the Opposition Party, Etheridge ran again for the seat in a still more heated campaign in 1859, and managed to defeat Atkins by just eight votes out of nearly 19,000 votes cast.

During this tumultuous third term, Etheridge consistently expressed opposition to secessionist sentiment in the South. He endorsed the centrist campaign of fellow Tennessean John Bell in the 1860 presidential election. Following Abraham Lincoln's victory in the election, Etheridge offered a "Border States Plan" that would protect the institution of slavery while preserving the Union, but the plan failed to pass in the House. In January 1861, he declared secession to be a rebellion that must be put down at any cost.

== Civil War ==
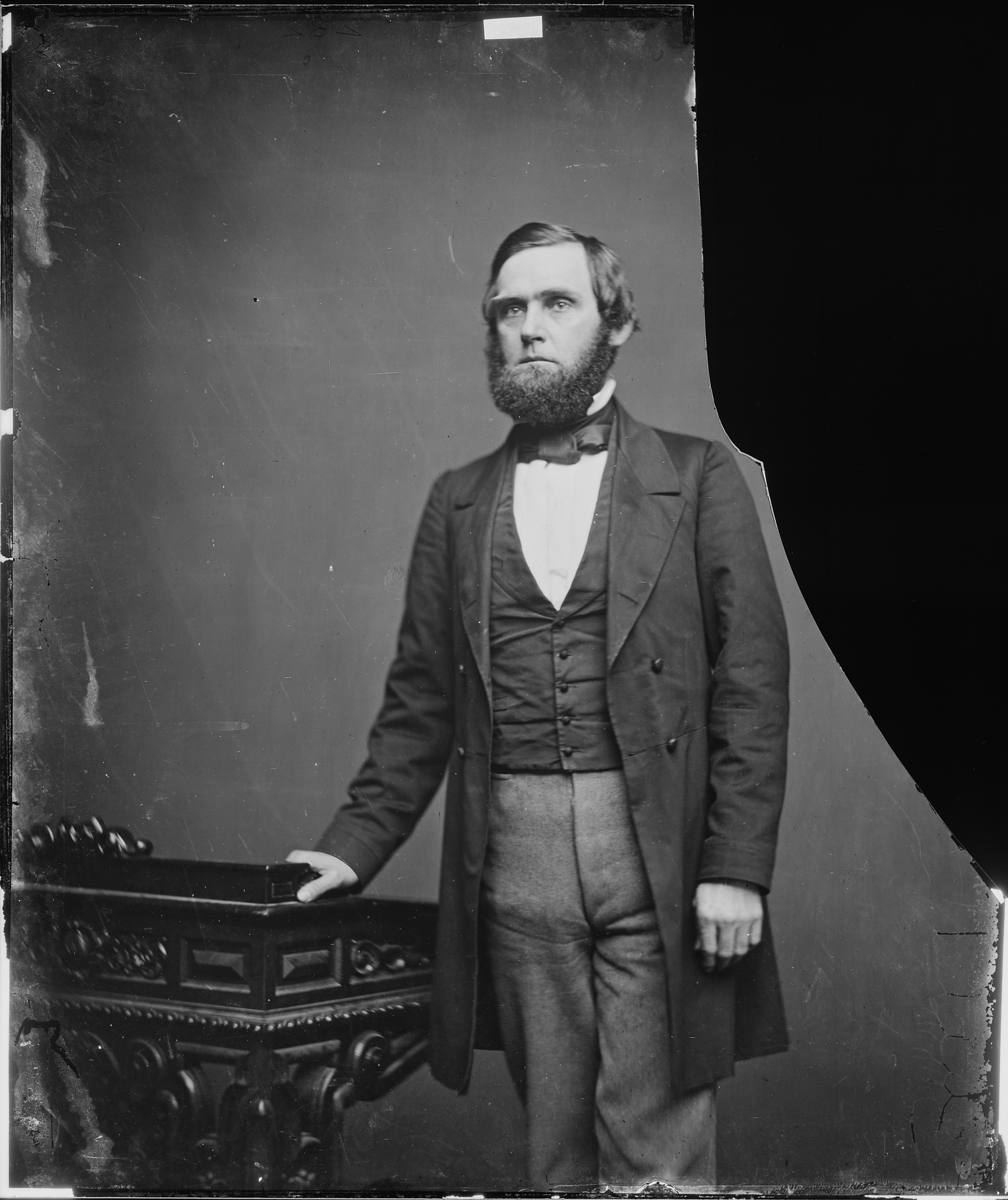
Hon. Emerson Etheridge, photographed by Mathew Brady

During the spring of 1861, Etheridge returned to Tennessee to campaign against secession, often speaking to bitterly divided audiences. At one stop in Paris, Tennessee, a mob of secessionists broke up the rally, killing one Unionist in the process. After Tennessee voted to secede in June 1861, Etheridge returned to Washington (as did Andrew Johnson). In recognition of his dedication to preserving the Union, the House elected him Clerk of the House of Representatives in July 1861.

After the Union Army regained control of Nashville in early 1862, Etheridge returned to the city and spoke before a crowd of 1,200. He threw his support behind Andrew Johnson, who had by then been appointed Military Governor of Tennessee. Etheridge turned against the Lincoln Administration after Lincoln issued the Emancipation Proclamation, as he considered its issuance a betrayal of his promise to Southern Unionists not to tamper with slavery. In December 1863, he joined an unsuccessful plot to give Democrats and Southern Unionists control of the House, using his position as Clerk to try and invalidate the credentials of Republican congressmen. In response, the House voted to replace him as Clerk that same month.

By June 1865, Etheridge was the most vocal critic of William "Parson" Brownlow, an ardent anti-secessionist who had been elected governor after Johnson became vice president earlier that year. Etheridge considered several measures passed by Brownlow and his supporters in the state legislature tyrannical, especially attempts to deny ex-Confederates the right to vote.

Etheridge campaigned for reelection to Congress in 1865, but so strong was his criticism of Brownlow and Lincoln that he was arrested by military authorities for "attempting to incite the people of Tennessee to reinaugurate revolution and bloodshed" and "insulting the revered memory of Abraham Lincoln," and jailed in Columbus, Kentucky, until after the August election. Though he was eventually acquitted of the charges, he was defeated in the election.

== Campaign for governor ==
By 1866, Etheridge was a leader among Tennessee's Conservative Republicans, allies of Andrew Johnson who opposed Brownlow and sought a return to pre-Civil War conditions. Brownlow and his associates in the state legislature had aligned themselves with the Radical Republicans, who sought to punish former Confederates and extend the right to vote to freed slaves. While Brownlow was up for reelection in 1867, he faced little chance of defeat with ex-Confederates disenfranchised. Furthermore, the state legislature, controlled by his allies, had given him unprecedented powers over voter registration and the election process. In April 1867, the Conservatives met at Nashville and nominated Etheridge to run against Brownlow for governor. The Conservative platform called for fidelity to the U.S. Constitution and obedience to all constitutionally-enacted laws, the assurance of "all the rights of freemen" to African Americans, and the extension of the right to vote to former Confederates. It also rejected "tyranny" and "military despotisms," a reference to a law passed by the legislature giving Brownlow the power to declare martial law in any county.

In accepting the nomination, Etheridge blasted the Brownlow administration as an "ignorant, brutal and irresponsible despotism," and stated the goal of the Conservative campaign was to end the "meanest tyranny which was ever hatched in the foul air of distempered times." Brownlow's newspaper, the Knoxville Whig, derided Etheridge as a "blasé party scullion, the Thersites of the stump, the trafficker of the most foul, vulgar and filthy slang ever spewed by an obscene mind upon the hustings" whose "violent passions always carried him to offensive extremes." The Whig further suggested that Conservatives reluctantly chose Etheridge out of desperation after more plausible Conservatives rejected the nomination.

Chronic illness had left Brownlow unable to campaign, and he thus relied on his political allies to stump for him. In May, Etheridge debated Congressman William B. Stokes at a campaign stop in Memphis. Stokes equated Etheridge's denunciation of the Emancipation Proclamation as "giving aid and comfort" to the Rebel cause, noted that Etheridge had been court-martialed for treasonous speech, and complained that Etheridge had mocked his lack of formal education. In his retort, Etheridge accused Stokes of writing a letter in May 1861 criticizing Lincoln's call for troops to put down the rebellion and suggested Stokes was too ignorant to understand the court-martial's proceedings. "Mr. Stokes says he is not educated. He need not have told it." He finished by stating that Brownlow "calls people seditionists because they won't make him king."

Etheridge's campaign stops in East Tennessee frequently turned violent. While Etheridge had been endorsed by prominent East Tennessee Unionists such as T.A.R. Nelson, John Baxter, and John Netherland, the region was also home to Brownlow's fiercest and most loyal supporters. In June, fights broke out between Brownlow and Etheridge supporters at Greeneville and Morristown, and gunfire nearly erupted in Maryville when Etheridge campaigned there in July. Following a speech by Etheridge in Rogersville in late July, a mob of Radicals surrounded the hotel where Etheridge was staying and opened fire, igniting a five-minute gun battle that left one person dead and several seriously wounded.

On election day in August 1867, Brownlow defeated Etheridge, 74,034 votes to 22,550. In spite of the wide margin, Etheridge's campaign boosted the statewide opposition to Brownlow, which eventually led to the fall of the Radical administration and the restoring of voting rights to ex-Confederates in 1870.

== Later life ==
Etheridge was elected to the Tennessee Senate in 1869, representing the 22nd district (Weakley, Obion and Henry counties). He spent much of his term calling for the repudiation of the state's debt, which was getting out of control (the state debt would be the dominant issue in state politics over the subsequent decade). He also supported a call for a constitutional convention. This convention, which took place in 1870, restored the right to vote to former Confederates, and as a result, Democrats regained control of the state government.

Etheridge moved to Memphis in 1871 after his term in the state senate had ended. He endorsed Horace Greeley for president in 1872, but declined to campaign for him as an elector. In 1874, Etheridge ran for the state senate as a member of the People's Reform Party, or "Dark Lanterns." In October of that year, he delivered a bizarre and rambling speech at the Greenlaw Opera House in Memphis in which, according to one Memphis newspaper, he "abused everybody and everything. He abused the Democracy, Conservatism, Radicalism, funders, the press, the leaders of both parties," and "hurled his invectives and abuse at the world generally." He was easily defeated in the election by the Democratic candidate, Peyton J. Smith.

Etheridge had rejoined the Republican Party by 1876, when he endorsed Rutherford B. Hayes for president. He ran on the Republican ticket for state senator, but was defeated by the Democratic candidate, William A. Milliken. In August 1878, the state Republican Party nominated Etheridge as its candidate for governor. His nomination was controversial, as one delegate recalled his attacks on the Republican Party in the late 1860s, and others pointed out that Etheridge's calls for repudiating the state debt ran counter to the party's platform. Etheridge subsequently declined the nomination. His replacement, Chattanooga mayor Eli Wight, was badly defeated in the general election.

Etheridge became active in the Prohibition movement in the early 1880s, and helped organize the state's Prohibition ticket in 1882. In 1884, he ran for the 9th district congressional seat on the Republican ticket, but was defeated by the Democratic candidate, Presley T. Glass, 13,481 votes to 11,019.

In 1888, Etheridge served alongside Hugh B. Lindsay as an at-large elector for the Republican presidential candidate, Benjamin Harrison. In February 1891, Harrison appointed Etheridge Surveyor of Customs at Memphis. He remained in this position until he resigned in March 1894.

By the early 1900s, Etheridge's health and intellect had declined. He died in Dresden on October 21, 1902 (age 83 years, 23 days). He is interred at Mount Vernon Cemetery near Sharon.

The city of Ethridge in Lawrence County, Tennessee, is believed to have been named for Etheridge.

Party political offices
First	Conservative nominee for Governor of Tennessee; 1867	Succeeded by None
U.S. House of Representatives
Preceded by Isham G. Harris	Member of the U.S. House of Representatives from Tennessee's 9th congressional district 1853–1857	Succeeded by John D.C. Atkins
Preceded by John D.C. Atkins	Member of the U.S. House of Representatives from Tennessee's 9th congressional district 1859–1861	Succeeded by Barbour Lewis
Government offices
Preceded by John W. Forney	Clerk of the United States House of Representatives; 1861–1863	Succeeded by Edward McPherson
