= Tennessee's 9th congressional district =

U.S. House district for Tennessee

Coordinates: 35°10′00″N 89°58′39″W

- Interactive map of district boundaries
- Representative: Steve Cohen; D–Memphis
- Distribution: 98.54% urban; 1.46% rural
- Population (2025): 744,184
- Median household income: $60,172
- Ethnicity: 60.2% Black; 25.2% White; 9.2% Hispanic; 2.8% Two or more races; 2.0% Asian; 0.6% other
- Cook PVI: R+9

Tennessee's 9th congressional district is a congressional district in West Tennessee, covering most of Memphis and its inner suburbs. It has been represented by Democrat Steve Cohen since 2007.

The district was re-created as a result of the redistricting cycle after the 1980 census. The district is almost exclusively urban, due to its mostly cohabitant nature with Memphis. The district, as shaped for the 119th Congress, has the lowest median income of the state's districts, at $53,598. It also ranks first in the state with the poverty rate at 22.7 percent, per a 2026 congressional study.

As of 2026, it is the only majority minority congressional district in Tennessee and the only surviving "Democratic stronghold" district (Nashville had been one until it was 'cracked' in 2022's redistricting). Since 1875, the area has sent mostly Democrats to Congress with the exception of a brief period from 1967 to 1975 when it was represented by Republican Dan Kuykendall.

However, with the 'voluntary redistricting' that the state government rushed through in May 2026, Memphis was 'cracked' in thirds, turning this district from D+22 to R+9 in the Cook Partisan Voting Index rating for the 2026 elections, no longer almost exclusively urban nor representing Memphis as a cohesive whole.

== Current boundaries ==
For the 118th and successive Congresses (based on redistricting following the 2020 census), the district contains all or portions of the following counties and communities:

Shelby County (4)

Bartlett (part; also 8th), Collierville (part; also 8th), Memphis (part; also 8th), Millington

Tipton County (8)

Atoka (part; also 8th), Brighton (part; also 8th), Burlison, Covington (part; also 8th), Garland, Gilt Edge, Munford, Randolph

== Recent election results from statewide races ==
Year	Office	Results
2008	President	Obama 73% - 26%
2012	President	Obama 74% - 26%
2016	President	Clinton 72% - 25%
2018	Senate	Bredesen 75% - 23%
2018	Governor	Dean 70% - 26%
2020	President	Biden 73% - 25%
2020	Senate	Bradshaw 71% - 26%
2022	Governor	Martin 65% - 33%
2024	President	Harris 70% - 28%
2024	Senate	Johnson 68% - 29%

== History ==
Arguably, the district's current characteristics began to take shape in 1925 –the first year a congressional district consisted exclusively of Shelby County.

A congressional district was perfectly coextensive with Shelby County from 1925 until 1966, numbered as the 10th from 1925 to 1933 and from 1943 to 1953, then the 9th from 1933 to 1943 and the 9th from 1953 to 1966.

In 1966, the Supreme Court case Baker v. Carr took effect. In that ruling, the court laid out a "one man, one vote" standard. Prior to 1966, the 9th was nearly ten times larger in population than the nearby 7th and 8th.

1967 was the first year where the district covered merely a fraction of Shelby County rather than the county's entirety. In that election, the district chose former US Senate Republican nominee Dan Kuykendall. The district was renumbered the 8th in 1973 and was pushed further into Memphis. In 1974, in the midst of Watergate, Kuykendall supported Nixon throughout the scandal, and was subsequently defeated by Democrat Harold Ford Sr., whose family had strong political ties in Memphis dating back to at least the 1920s.

The district has voted Democratic in every congressional race since 1974. After the 1980 census saw it become the 9th once again and was drawn as a black-majority district. This allowed the Democrats to consolidate their hold on the seat. With most of Memphis' wealthier and now heavily Republican eastern portion now in the 7th, the GOP largely lost interest in the 9th; only nominal Republican candidates have run there from 1982 onward.

Ford served in Congress for 22 years, when he was replaced by his son—Harold Ford Jr.—in 1997. The younger Ford served for ten years, until he mounted an unsuccessful bid for US Senate. Concurrent to Ford's senate bid, the district chose state senator Steve Cohen over Ford's brother Jake, with the Republicans pushed into third place. Cohen is noted for being Tennessee's first Jewish congressman, and was the first white Democrat to represent a significant portion of Memphis in 40 years. He has been elected seven times, and since 2022 has been the only Democrat in the state's delegation.

== List of members representing the district ==
Name	Party	Years	Cong ress	Electoral history	
District established March 4, 1823
Adam R. Alexander (Jackson)	Democratic-Republican	March 4, 1823 – March 3, 1825	18th 19th	Elected in 1823. Re-elected in 1825. Lost re-election.	
Adam R. Alexander (Jackson)	Jacksonian	March 4, 1825 – March 3, 1827	18th 19th	Elected in 1823. Re-elected in 1825. Lost re-election.	
Davy Crockett (Crockett)	Jacksonian	March 4, 1827 – March 3, 1829	20th 21st	Elected in 1827. Re-elected in 1829. Lost re-election.	
Davy Crockett (Crockett)	Anti-Jacksonian	March 4, 1829 – March 3, 1831	20th 21st	Elected in 1827. Re-elected in 1829. Lost re-election.	
William Fitzgerald (Dresden)	Jacksonian	March 4, 1831 – March 3, 1833	22nd	Elected in 1831. Redistricted to the 12th district and lost re-election.	
James K. Polk (Columbia)	Jacksonian	March 4, 1833 – March 3, 1837	23rd 24th 25th	Redistricted from the 6th district and re-elected in 1833. Re-elected in 1835. Re-elected in 1837. Retired to run for Governor of Tennessee.	
James K. Polk (Columbia)	Democratic	March 4, 1837 – March 3, 1839	23rd 24th 25th	Redistricted from the 6th district and re-elected in 1833. Re-elected in 1835. Re-elected in 1837. Retired to run for Governor of Tennessee.	
Harvey M. Watterson (Shelbyville)	Democratic	March 4, 1839 – March 3, 1843	26th 27th	Elected in 1839. Re-elected in 1841. Retired.	
Cave Johnson (Clarksville)	Democratic	March 4, 1843 – March 3, 1845	28th	Redistricted from the 11th district and re-elected in 1843. Retired.	
Lucien B. Chase (Clarksville)	Democratic	March 4, 1845 – March 3, 1849	29th 30th	Elected in 1845. Re-elected in 1847. Retired.	
Isham G. Harris (Paris)	Democratic	March 4, 1849 – March 3, 1853	31st 32nd	Elected in 1849. Re-elected in 1851. Retired.	
Emerson Etheridge (Dresden)	Whig	March 4, 1853 – March 3, 1855	33rd 34th	Elected in 1853. Re-elected in 1855. Lost re-election.	
Emerson Etheridge (Dresden)	Know Nothing	March 4, 1855 – March 3, 1857	33rd 34th	Elected in 1853. Re-elected in 1855. Lost re-election.	
John D. C. Atkins (Paris)	Democratic	March 4, 1857 – March 3, 1859	35th	Elected in 1857. Lost re-election.	
Emerson Etheridge (Dresden)	Opposition	March 4, 1859 – March 3, 1861	36th	Elected in 1859. Retired after West Tennessee seceded.	
District inactive		March 4, 1861 – March 3, 1863	37th	Civil War	
District dissolved March 4, 1863
District re-established March 4, 1873
Barbour Lewis (Memphis)	Republican	March 4, 1873 – March 3, 1875	43rd	Elected in 1872. Redistricted to the 10th district and lost re-election.	
William P. Caldwell (Gardner)	Democratic	March 4, 1875 – March 3, 1879	44th 45th	Elected in 1874. Re-elected in 1876. Retired.	
Charles B. Simonton (Covington)	Democratic	March 4, 1879 – March 3, 1883	46th 47th	Elected in 1878. Re-elected in 1880. Retired.	
Rice A. Pierce (Union City)	Democratic	March 4, 1883 – March 3, 1885	48th	Elected in 1882. Lost renomination.	
Presley T. Glass (Ripley)	Democratic	March 4, 1885 – March 3, 1889	49th 50th	Elected in 1884. Re-elected in 1886. Lost renomination.	
Rice A. Pierce (Union City)	Democratic	March 4, 1889 – March 3, 1893	51st 52nd	Elected in 1888. Re-elected in 1890. Lost re-election as an Independent Democrat.	
James C. McDearmon (Trenton)	Democratic	March 4, 1893 – March 3, 1897	53rd 54th	Elected in 1892. Re-elected in 1894. Lost renomination.	
Rice A. Pierce (Union City)	Democratic	March 4, 1897 – March 3, 1905	55th 56th 57th 58th	Elected in 1896. Re-elected in 1898. Re-elected in 1900. Re-elected in 1902. Lost renomination.	
Finis J. Garrett (Dresden)	Democratic	March 4, 1905 – March 3, 1929	59th 60th 61st 62nd 63rd 64th 65th 66th 67th 68th 69th 70th	Elected in 1904. Re-elected in 1906. Re-elected in 1908. Re-elected in 1910. Re-elected in 1912. Re-elected in 1914. Re-elected in 1916. Re-elected in 1918. Re-elected in 1920. Re-elected in 1922. Re-elected in 1924. Re-elected in 1926. Retired to run for U.S. senator.	
Jere Cooper (Dyersburg)	Democratic	March 4, 1929 – March 3, 1933	71st 72nd	Elected in 1928. Re-elected in 1930. Redistricted to the 8th district.	
E.H. Crump (Memphis)	Democratic	March 4, 1933 – January 3, 1935	73rd	Redistricted from the 10th district and re-elected in 1932. Retired.	
Clift Chandler (Memphis)	Democratic	January 3, 1935 – January 2, 1940	74th 75th 76th	Elected in 1934. Re-elected in 1936. Re-elected in 1938. Resigned when elected Mayor of Memphis.	
Vacant		January 2, 1940 – February 15, 1940	76th		
Clifford Davis (Memphis)	Democratic	February 15, 1940 – January 3, 1943	76th 77th	Elected to finish Chandler's term. Re-elected in 1940. Redistricted to the 10th district.	
Jere Cooper (Dyersburg)	Democratic	January 3, 1943 – January 3, 1953	78th 79th 80th 81st 82nd	Redistricted from the 8th district and re-elected in 1942. Re-elected in 1944. Re-elected in 1946. Re-elected in 1948. Re-elected in 1950. Redistricted to the 8th district.	
Clifford Davis (Memphis)	Democratic	January 3, 1953 – January 3, 1965	83rd 84th 85th 86th 87th 88th	Redistricted from the 10th district and re-elected in 1952. Re-elected in 1954. Re-elected in 1956. Re-elected in 1958. Re-elected in 1960. Re-elected in 1962. Lost renomination.	
George Grider (Memphis)	Democratic	January 3, 1965 – January 3, 1967	89th	Elected in 1964. Lost re-election.	
Dan Kuykendall (Memphis)	Republican	January 3, 1967 – January 3, 1973	90th 91st 92nd	Elected in 1966. Re-elected in 1968. Re-elected in 1970. Redistricted to the 8th district.	
District dissolved January 3, 1973
District re-established January 3, 1983
Harold Ford Sr. (Memphis)	Democratic	January 3, 1983 – January 3, 1997	98th 99th 100th 101st 102nd 103rd 104th	Redistricted from the 8th district and re-elected in 1982. Re-elected in 1984. Re-elected in 1986. Re-elected in 1988. Re-elected in 1990. Re-elected in 1992. Re-elected in 1994. Retired.	
Harold Ford Jr. (Memphis)	Democratic	January 3, 1997 – January 3, 2007	105th 106th 107th 108th 109th	Elected in 1996. Re-elected in 1998. Re-elected in 2000. Re-elected in 2002. Re-elected in 2004. Retired to run for U.S. senator.	
Harold Ford Jr. (Memphis)	Democratic	January 3, 1997 – January 3, 2007	105th 106th 107th 108th 109th	Elected in 1996. Re-elected in 1998. Re-elected in 2000. Re-elected in 2002. Re-elected in 2004. Retired to run for U.S. senator.	2003–2013
Steve Cohen (Memphis)	Democratic	January 3, 2007 – present	110th 111th 112th 113th 114th 115th 116th 117th 118th 119th	Elected in 2006. Re-elected in 2008. Re-elected in 2010. Re-elected in 2012. Re-elected in 2014. Re-elected in 2016. Re-elected in 2018. Re-elected in 2020. Re-elected in 2022. Re-elected in 2024. Retiring at end of term due to redistricting.	2003–2013
Steve Cohen (Memphis)	Democratic	January 3, 2007 – present	110th 111th 112th 113th 114th 115th 116th 117th 118th 119th	Elected in 2006. Re-elected in 2008. Re-elected in 2010. Re-elected in 2012. Re-elected in 2014. Re-elected in 2016. Re-elected in 2018. Re-elected in 2020. Re-elected in 2022. Re-elected in 2024. Retiring at end of term due to redistricting.	2013–2023
Steve Cohen (Memphis)	Democratic	January 3, 2007 – present	110th 111th 112th 113th 114th 115th 116th 117th 118th 119th	Elected in 2006. Re-elected in 2008. Re-elected in 2010. Re-elected in 2012. Re-elected in 2014. Re-elected in 2016. Re-elected in 2018. Re-elected in 2020. Re-elected in 2022. Re-elected in 2024. Retiring at end of term due to redistricting.	2023–2027
Brent Taylor	Republican	Assuming office on January 3, 2027		Elected in 2026.	2023–2027

== Recent election results ==
=== 2012 ===
2012 United States House of Representatives elections in Tennessee
Party	Candidate	Votes	%
Democratic	Steve Cohen (Incumbent)	188,422	75.1%
Republican	George S. Flinn, Jr.	59,742	23.8%
Independent	Brian L. Saulsberry	1,448	0.6%
Independent	Gregory M. Joiner	1,372	0.5%
Total votes		250,987	100%
Democratic hold			

=== 2014 ===
2014 United States House of Representatives elections in Tennessee
Party	Candidate	Votes	%
Democratic	Steve Cohen (Incumbent)	87,376	75%
Republican	Charlotte Bergmann	27,173	23.3%
Independent	Floyd Wayne Alberson	766	0.7%
Independent	Paul Cook	752	0.6%
Independent	Herbert Bass	483	0.4%
Total votes		116,550	100%
Democratic hold			

=== 2016 ===
2016 United States House of Representatives elections in Tennessee
Party	Candidate	Votes	%
Democratic	Steve Cohen (Incumbent)	171,631	79%
Republican	Wayne Alberson	41,123	18.9%
Independent	Paul Cook	5,203	2.4%
Total votes		217,957	100%
Democratic hold			

=== 2018 ===
2018 United States House of Representatives elections in Tennessee
Party	Candidate	Votes	%
Democratic	Steve Cohen (Incumbent)	145,139	80%
Republican	Charlotte Bergmann	34,901	19.2%
Independent	Leo AwGoWhat	1,436	0.8%
Total votes		181,476	100%
Democratic hold			

=== 2020 ===
2020 United States House of Representatives elections in Tennessee
Party	Candidate	Votes	%
Democratic	Steve Cohen (Incumbent)	187,905	77.4%
Republican	Charlotte Bergmann	48,818	20.1%
Independent	Dennis Clark	3,962	1.6%
Independent	Bobby Lyons	2,192	0.9%
Total votes		242,880	100%
Democratic hold			

=== 2022 ===
2022 United States House of Representatives elections in Tennessee
Party	Candidate	Votes	%
Democratic	Steve Cohen (incumbent)	93,800	70.0%
Republican	Charlotte Bergmann	35,123	26.2%
Independent	George Flinn	3,349	2.5%
Independent	Dennis Clark	1,160	0.8%
Independent	Paul Cook	485	0.3%
Write-in	Bobby Lyons	1	0.0%
Total votes		133,918	100%
Democratic hold			

=== 2024 ===
2024 United States House of Representatives elections in Tennessee
Party	Candidate	Votes	%
Democratic	Steve Cohen (incumbent)	159,522	71.3%
Republican	Charlotte Bergmann	57,411	25.7%
Independent	William Wells	3,708	1.7%
Independent	Dennis Clark	3,062	1.4%
Total votes		223,703	100.00%
Democratic hold			

== See also ==
- Tennessee's congressional districts
- List of United States congressional districts
