= Barbour Lewis =

American politician

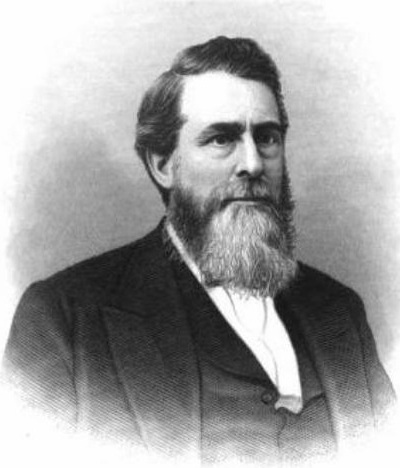

Member of the U.S. House of Representatives from Tennessee's 9th district
- In office March 4, 1873 – March 3, 1875
- Preceded by: Emerson Etheridge
- Succeeded by: William P. Caldwell

Personal details
- Born: January 5, 1818 Alburgh, Vermont
- Died: July 15, 1893 (aged 75) Colfax, Washington
- Party: Republican
- Education: Illinois College; Harvard Law School
- Profession: Lawyer

Barbour Lewis (January 5, 1818 – July 15, 1893) was an American politician and a member of the United States House of Representatives for Tennessee's 9th congressional district.

== Early life ==
Lewis was born in Alburgh, Vermont on January 5, 1818. He attended the common schools and graduated from Illinois College in Jacksonville, Illinois in 1846. While there, he was a founder of Sigma Pi Literary Society. He taught school in Mobile, Alabama, graduated from the law department of Harvard University.

== Career ==
Lewis was admitted to the bar, and began practicing law. In 1860, Lewis was a delegate to the Republican National Convention.

He enlisted in the Union Army on August 1, 1861, and served as captain of Company G, First Missouri Volunteers. He was appointed by the military authorities as judge of the civil commission court at Memphis, Tennessee in 1863. He was discharged from the service on November 15, 1864. He was president of the commissioners of Shelby County, Tennessee from 1867 to 1869.

Lewis was elected as a Republican to the 43rd Congress, and he served from March 4, 1873, to March 3, 1875. He was an unsuccessful candidate for re-election in 1874 to the 44th Congress. He resumed the practice of law in Memphis and moved to St. Louis, Missouri in 1878. He was appointed to the United States General Land Office in Salt Lake City, Utah, and he resigned in 1879.

After Lewis moved to Whitman County, Territory of Washington, he engaged in agricultural pursuits and stock raising.

== Death ==
Lewis died in Colfax, Washington, on July 15, 1893 (age 75 years, 191 days). He is interred at Colfax Cemetery.

U.S. House of Representatives
Preceded by Emerson Etheridge	Member of the U.S. House of Representatives from Tennessee's 9th congressional district 1873–1875	Succeeded by William P. Caldwell
