= List of commanders-in-chief of the United Confederate Veterans =

The commanders-in-chief of the United Confederate Veterans from June 10, 1889, to May 30, 1951.

== Commanders-in-chief of the United Confederate Veterans (UCV) ==
- John B. Gordon 1889-1904
- Stephen D. Lee 1904-1908
- William L. Cabell 1908-1909
- Clement A. Evans 1909-1910
- George W. Gordon 1910-1911
- Cornelius I. Walker 1911-1912
- Bennett H. Young 1912-1916
- George P. Harrison Jr. 1916-1919
- K. M. Van Zandt 1919-1921
- Julian S. Carr 1921-1923
- William B. Halderman 1923-1924
- James A. Thomas 1924-1925
- Walker B. Freeman 1925-1926
- Morris D. Vance 1926-1927
- James C. Foster 1927-1928
- Albert T. Goodwyn 1928-1929
- Richard A. Sneed 1929-1930
- Len W. Stephens 1930-1931
- Charles A. DeSaussure 1931-1932
- Homer T. Atkinson 1932-1934
- Rice A. Pierce 1934-1935
- Harry R. Lee 1935-1936
- Homer T. Atkinson 1936-1937
- John M. Claypool 1937-1938
- John W. Harris 1938-1939
- Julius F. Howell 1939-1941
- John M. Claypool 1941-1942
- John W. Harris 1942-1943
- Homer T. Atkinson 1943-1945
- William Banks 1945-1946
- Henry T. Dowling 1946-1947
- James W. Moore 1947-1948
- William. M. Buck 1948-1949
- James W. Moore 1949-1951

== Gallery ==
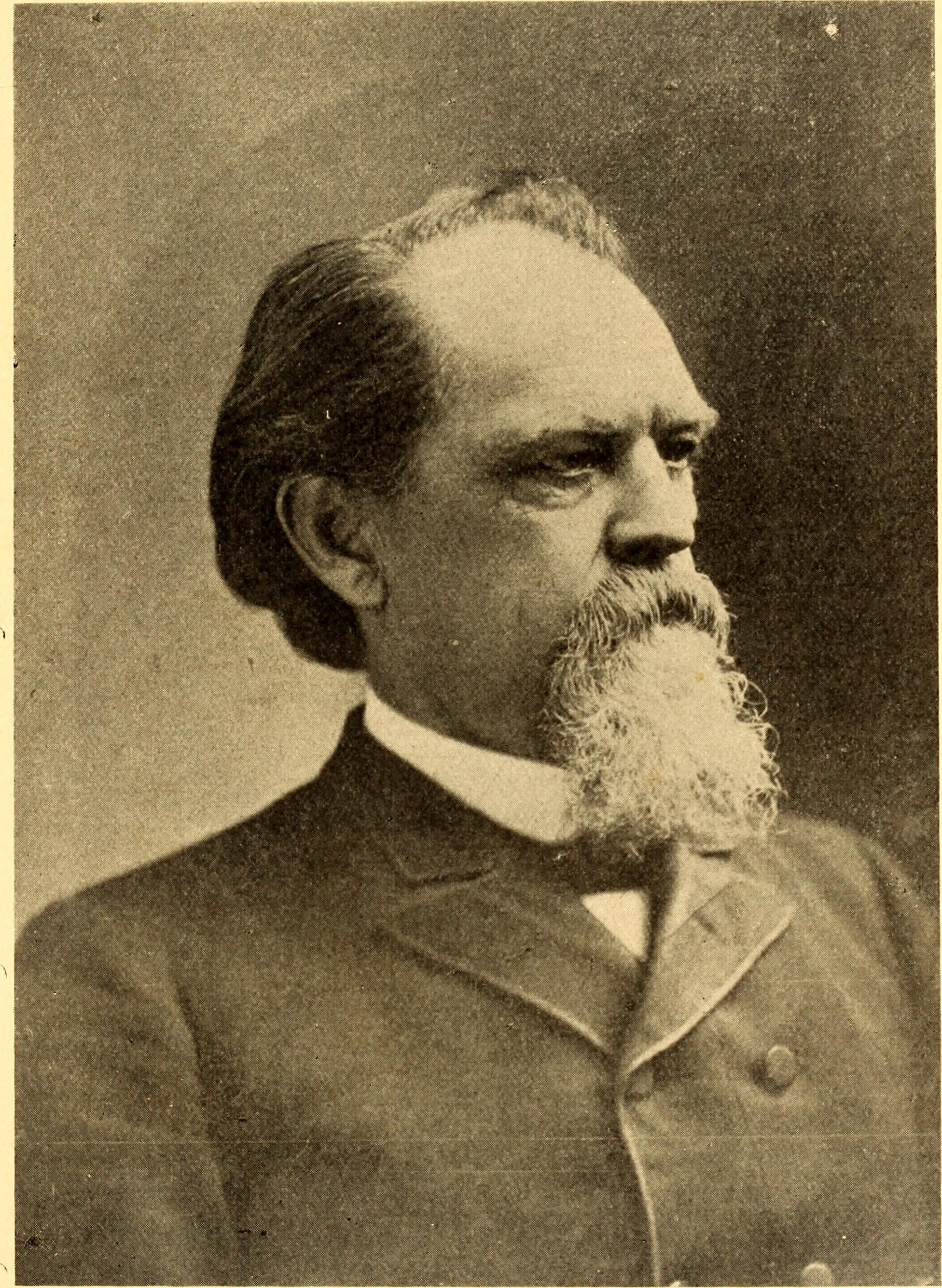
John Brown Gordon

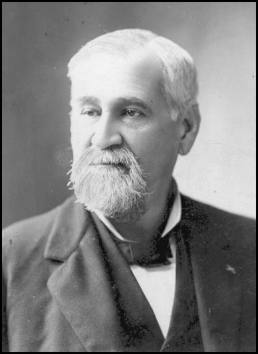
Stephen Dill Lee

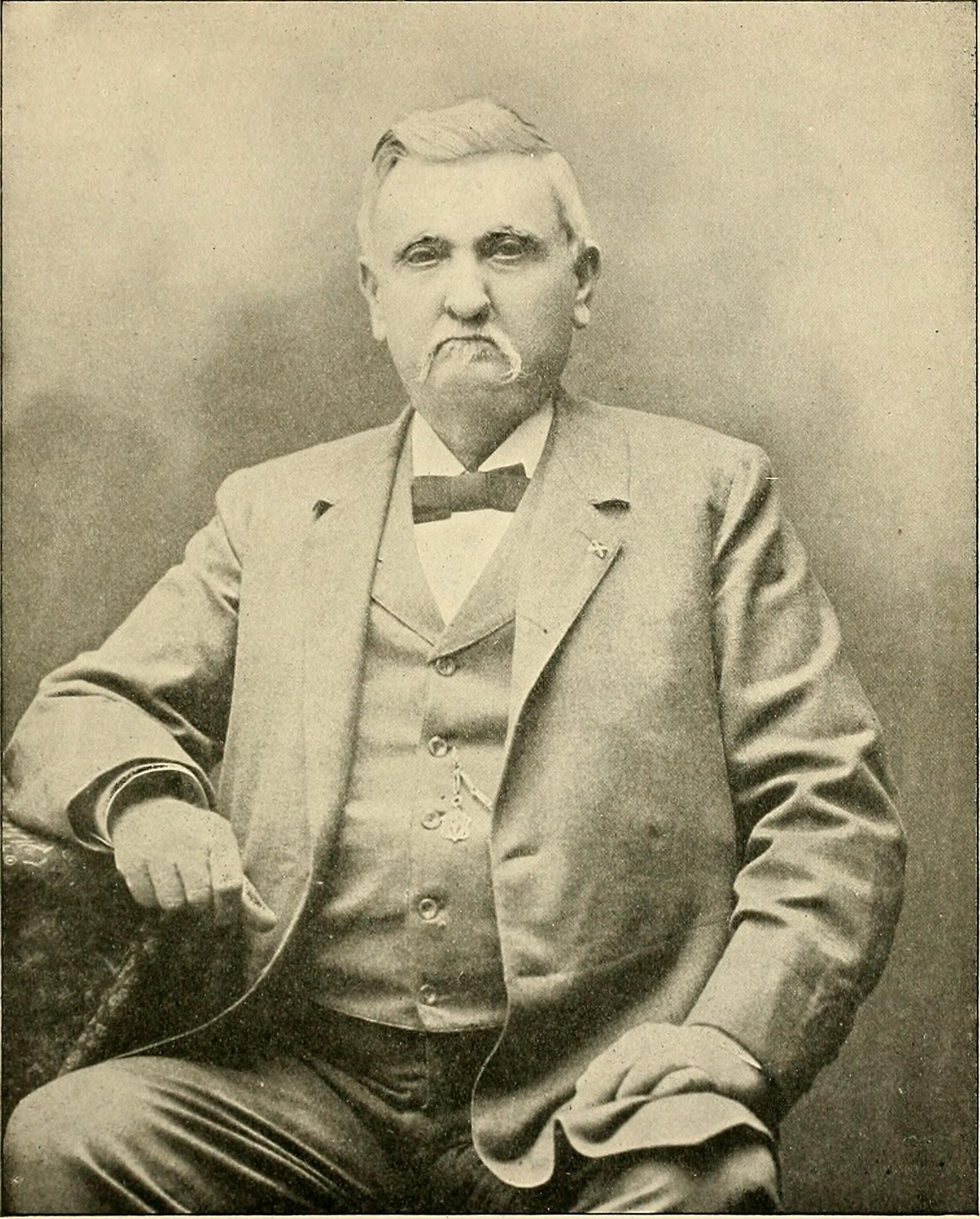
William Lewis Cabell

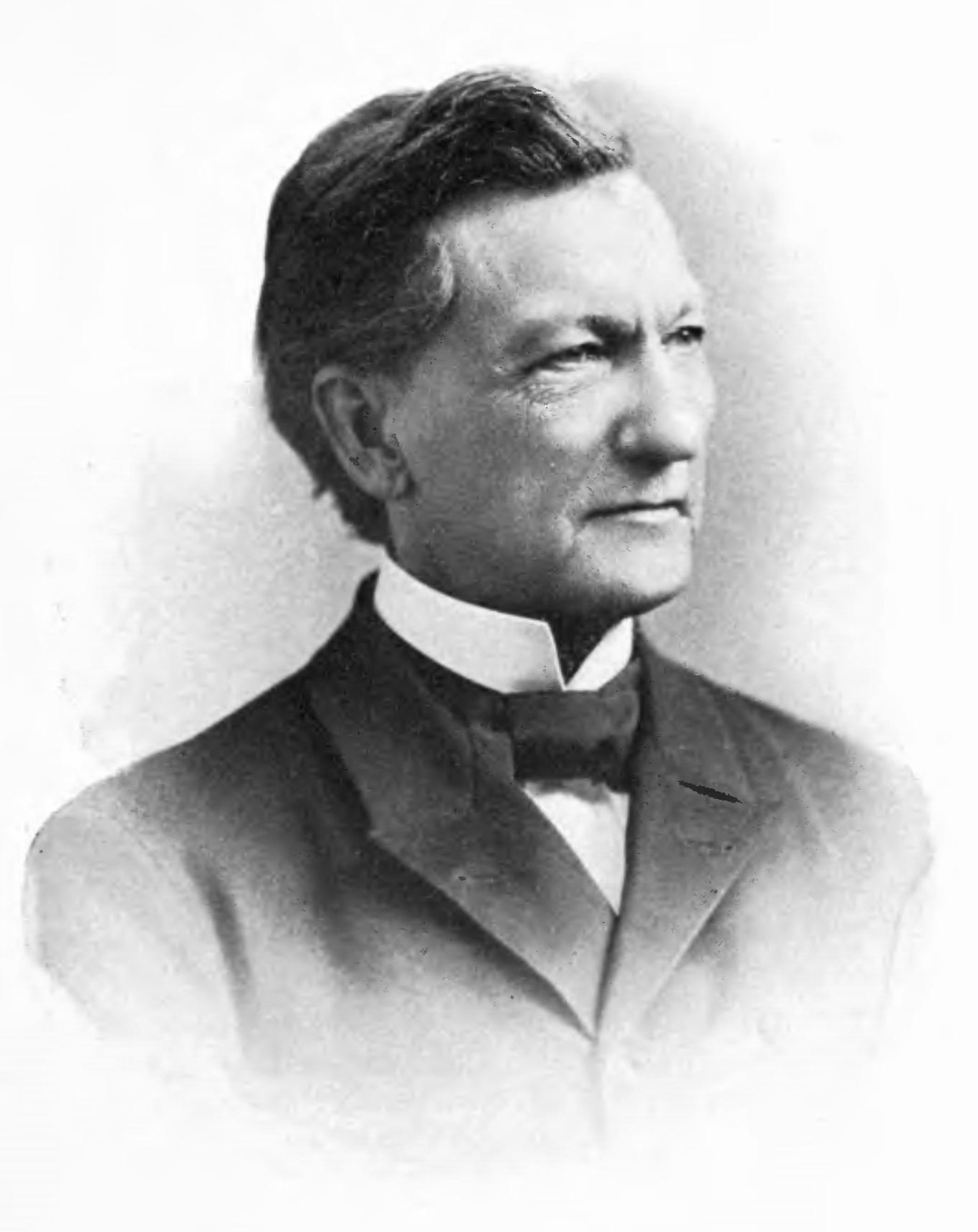
Clement Anselm Evans

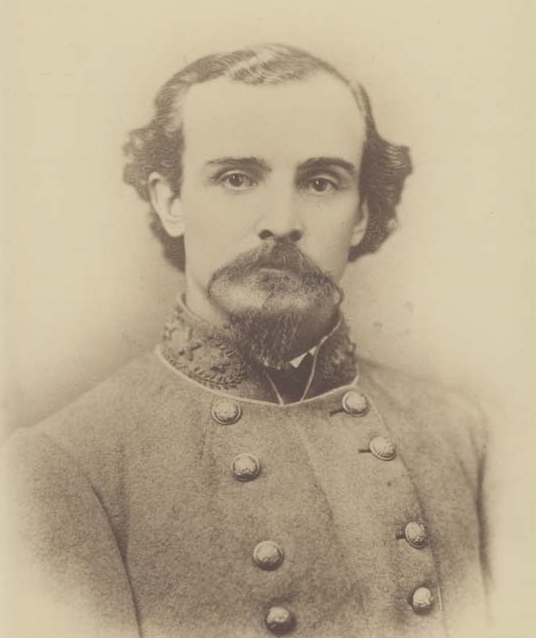
George Washington Gordon

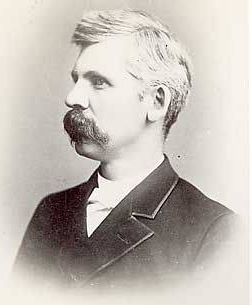
Bennett Henderson Young

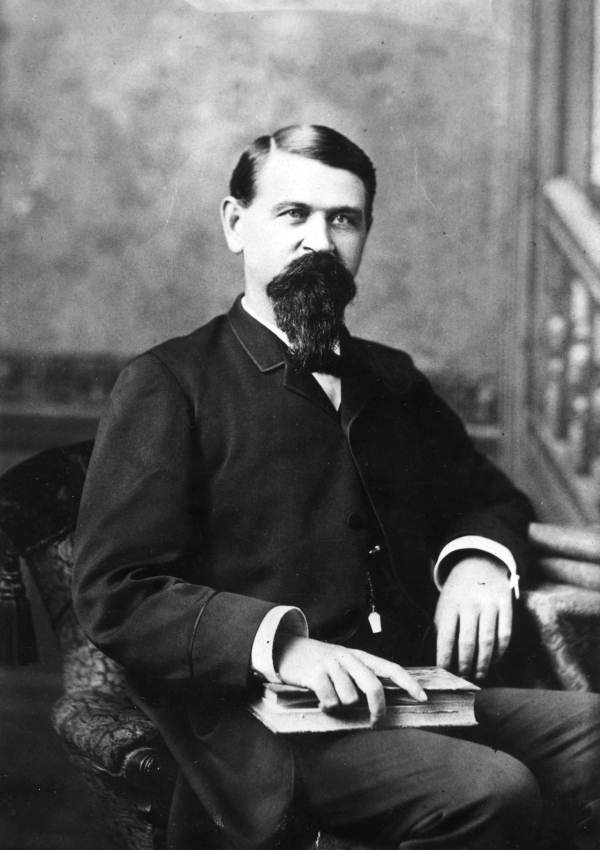
George Paul Harrison Jr.

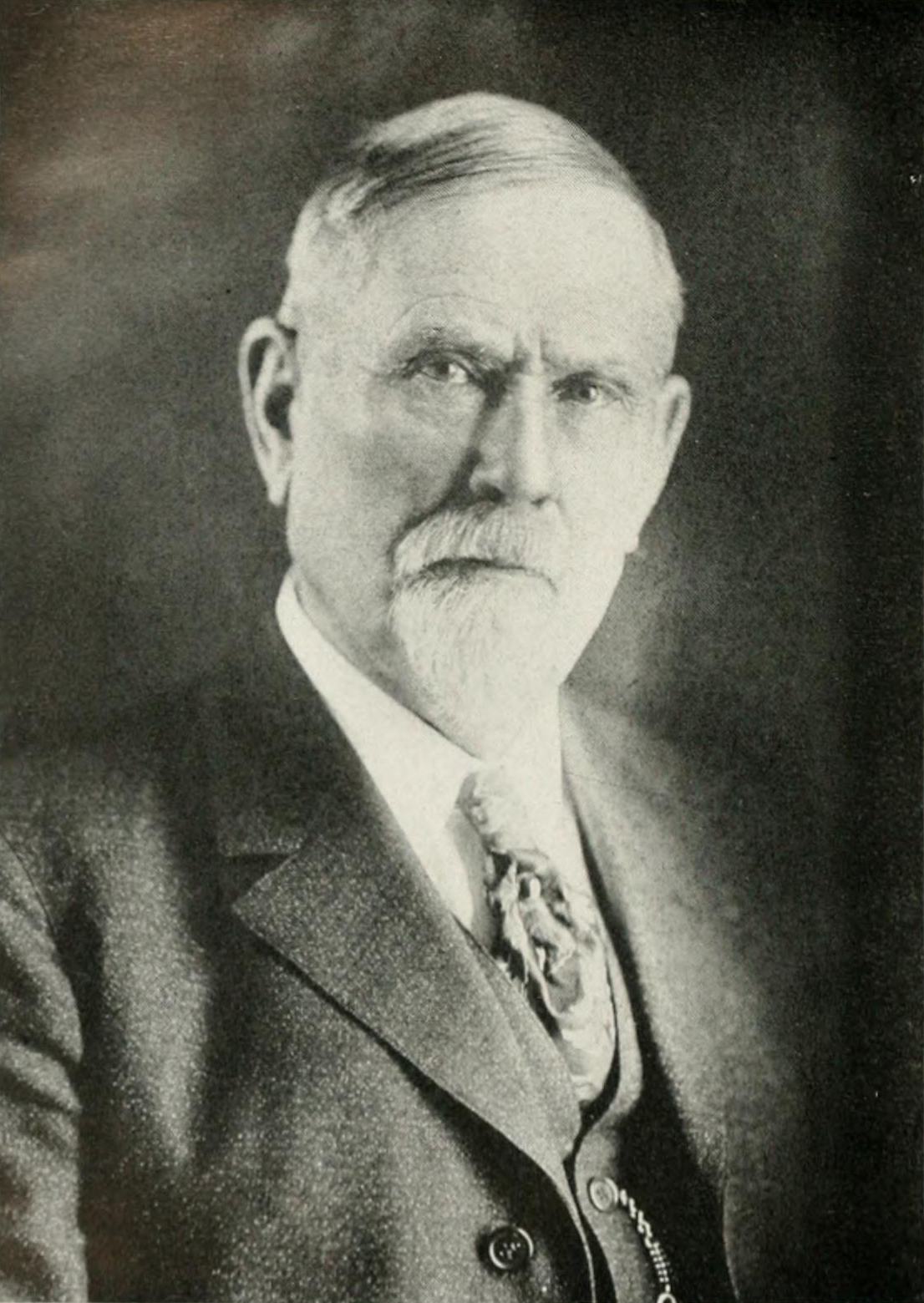
K. M. Van Zandt

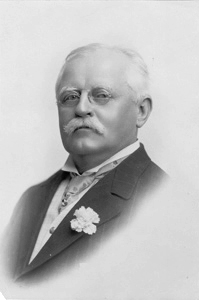
Julian Shakespeare Carr

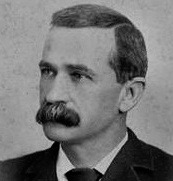
Albert Taylor Goodwyn

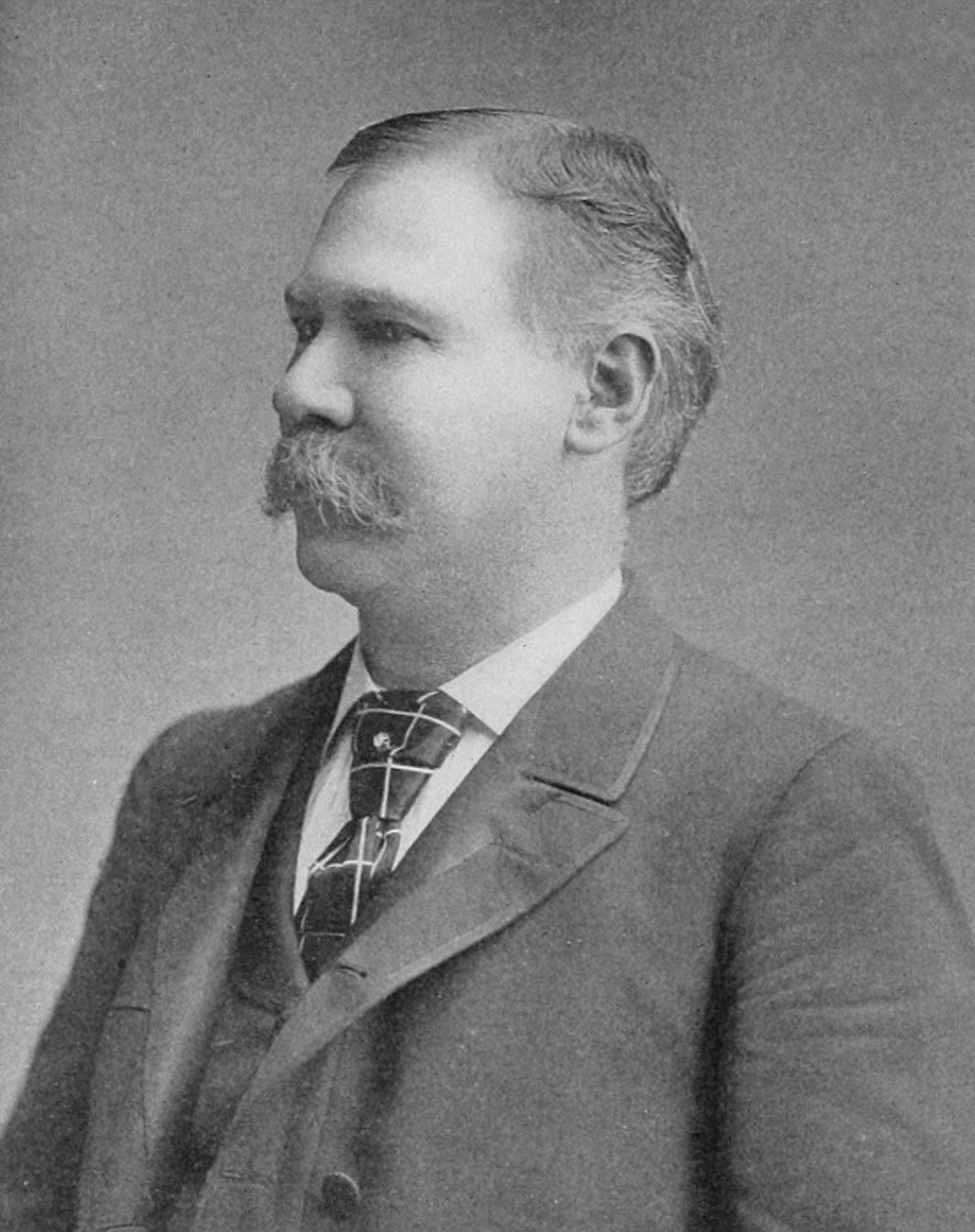
Rice Alexander Pierce
