= William Parker Caldwell House =

Historic house in Tennessee, United States

- U.S. National Register of Historic Places
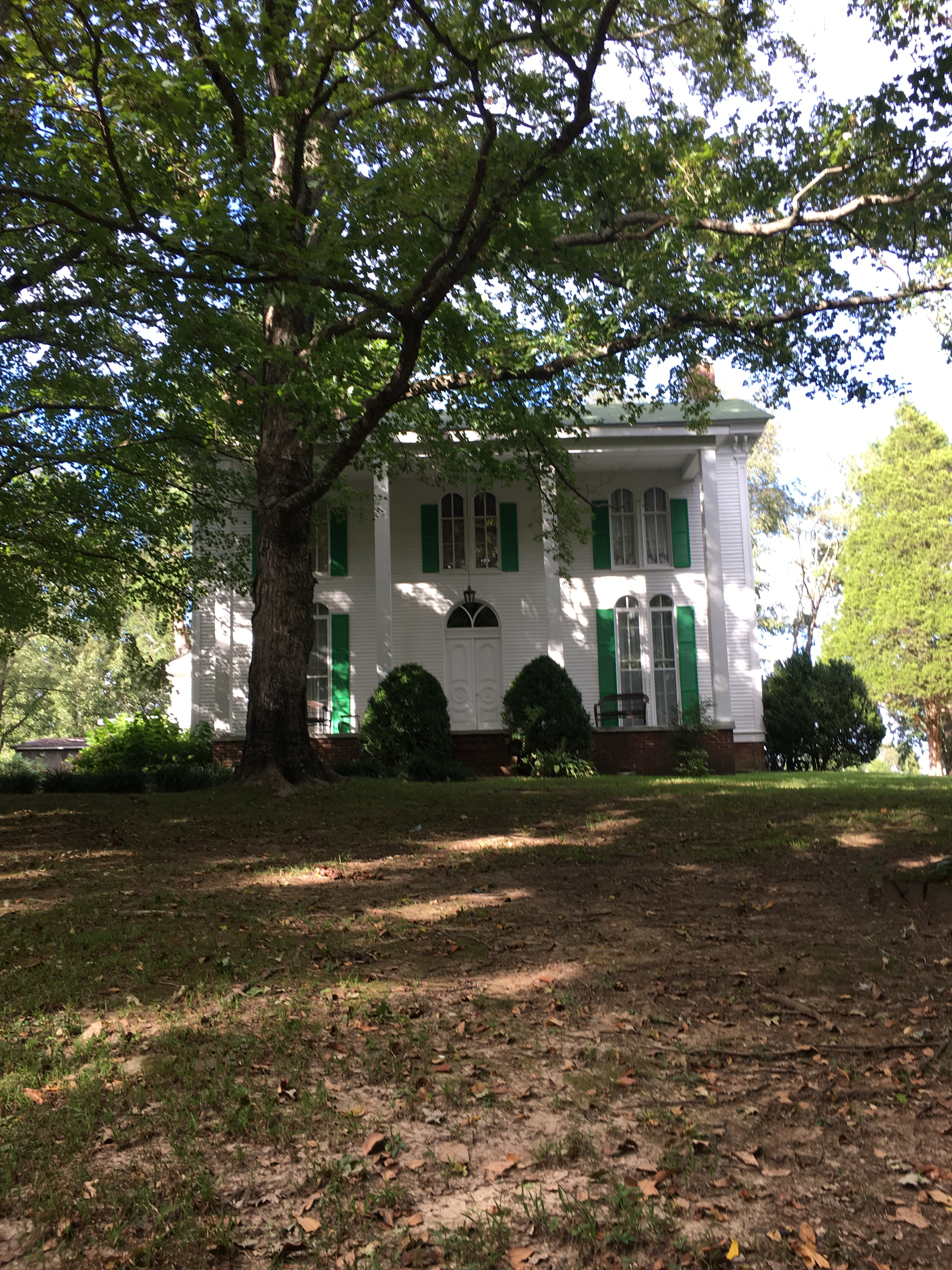

- Location within Tennessee Location within the United States
- Location: Off TN 22, Gardner, Tennessee
- Coordinates: 36°21′55″N 88°53′37″W
- Area: 1.2 acres (0.49 ha)
- Built: 1860
- NRHP reference No.: 79002485
- Added to NRHP: March 9, 1979

The William Parker Caldwell House is a property in the community of Gardner in Weakley County, Tennessee, that was the home of William Parker Caldwell, a local lawyer and politician who was Gardner's first mayor and who served in the U.S. House of Representatives and both houses of the Tennessee General Assembly. The historic home was listed on the National Register of Historic Places in 1979.
