= James C. McDearmon =

American lawyer and politician

James Calvin McDearmon
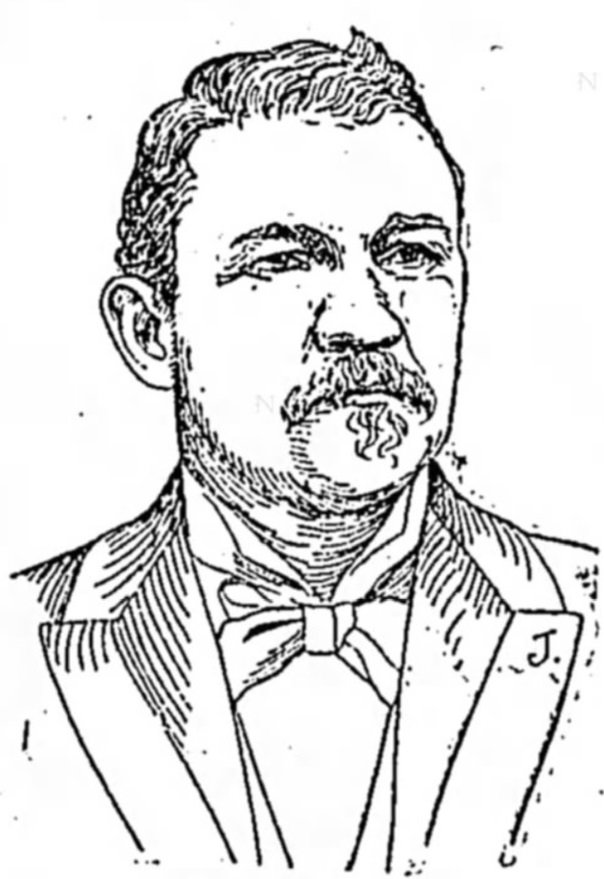
- Nashville American, November 5, 1894

Member of the U.S. House of Representatives from Tennessee's 9th district
- In office March 4, 1893 – March 3, 1897
- Preceded by: Rice A. Pierce
- Succeeded by: Rice A. Pierce

Personal details
- Born: June 13, 1844 New Canton, Virginia, U.S.
- Died: July 19, 1902 (aged 58) Trenton, Tennessee, U.S.
- Citizenship: United States
- Party: Democratic
- Spouse: Theodora McCulloch McDearmon
- Children: 1
- Education: Andrew College
- Profession: Politician, attorney

Military service
- Allegiance: Confederate States of America
- Branch/service: Confederate States Army
- Years of service: April 1862 - April 26, 1865
- Rank: Private
- Unit: Cheatham's division, Army of Tennessee
- Battles/wars: American Civil War

James Calvin McDearmon (June 13, 1844 – July 19, 1902) was an American politician and a member of the United States House of Representatives for the 9th congressional district of Tennessee.

== Biography ==
McDearmon was born on June 13, 1844, in New Canton, Virginia in Buckingham County. He moved with his parents to Gibson County, Tennessee in 1846. He attended Andrew College in Trenton, Tennessee from 1858 to 1861.

== Career and marriage ==
McDearmon entered the Confederate Army in April 1862 and served throughout the war in Cheatham's division, Army of Tennessee. He was wounded twice during the war at Murfreesboro and at Franklin and surrendered with Johnston's Army at Greensboro, North Carolina.

After the war, McDearmon studied law, was admitted to the bar in 1867, and commenced practice in Trenton, Tennessee. He was elected as a Democrat to the Fifty-third and Fifty-fourth Congresses. He served from March 4, 1893 to March 3, 1897. He was an unsuccessful candidate for renomination in 1896. He resumed the practice of his profession in Trenton. He was married, Dec. 4, 1867, to Theodora, daughter of M. T. McCulloch of Hayward county, Tenn.

== Death ==
McDearmon died in Trenton, Tennessee in Gibson County on July 19, 1902 (age 58 years, 36 days). He is interred at Oakland Cemetery.

U.S. House of Representatives
| Preceded by Rice A. Pierce | Member of the U.S. House of Representatives from Tennessee's 9th congressional district 1893–1897 | Succeeded by Rice A. Pierce |
