= Charles B. Simonton =

American politician (1838–1911)

Charles Bryson Simonton
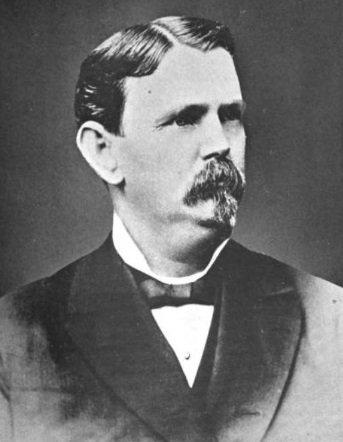

Member of the U.S. House of Representatives from Tennessee's 9th district
- In office March 4, 1879 – March 3, 1883
- Preceded by: William P. Caldwell
- Succeeded by: Rice A. Pierce

Personal details
- Born: September 8, 1838 Tipton County, Tennessee
- Died: June 10, 1911 (aged 72) Covington, Tennessee
- Party: Democratic
- Spouse: Mary Andros McDill Simonton
- Children: Anna Simonton; Ella Simonton; William McDill Simonton; Charles Pressley Simonton; Nannie May Simonton
- Education: Erskine College
- Profession: lawyer; politician; judge; editor

Charles Bryson Simonton (September 8, 1838 – June 10, 1911) was an American politician and a member of the United States House of Representatives for the 9th congressional district of Tennessee.

== Biography ==
Simonton was born in Tipton County, Tennessee, son of William and Catherine "Katie" Ferguson Simonton. He graduated from Erskine College in Due West, South Carolina in August 1859. He married Mary Andros "Minnie" McDill on October 16, 1866. He had five children, Anna Simonton, Ella Simonton, William McDill Simonton, Charles Pressley Simonton, and Nannie May Simonton.

== Career ==
Simonton enlisted as a private in Company C, Ninth Tennessee Infantry, Confederate Army in 1861. He subsequently became second lieutenant, and then captain. He was severely wounded during the Battle of Perryville on October 8, 1862 and disabled from any further active duty during the war. He was elected clerk of the circuit court of Tipton County in March 1870.

Simonton read law, and was admitted to the bar in 1873. He then commenced practice in Covington, Tennessee in Tipton County. He was also a member of the Tennessee House of Representatives from 1877 to 1879. He became the editor of the Tipton Record in Covington, Tennessee.

Elected as a Democrat to the Forty-sixth and Forty-seventh Congresses, Simonton served from March 4, 1879 to March 3, 1883. He was chairman of the Democratic state convention in 1886.

Simonton was president of the Covington city school board from 1892 to 1903. He was the United States district attorney for the Western district of Tennessee from 1895 to 1898.

== Death ==
Simonton died in Covington, Tennessee, and is interred at Munford Cemetery.

U.S. House of Representatives
Preceded by William P. Caldwell	Member of the U.S. House of Representatives from Tennessee's 9th congressional district 1879–1883	Succeeded by Rice A. Pierce
