= William Parker Caldwell =

American politician (1832–1903)

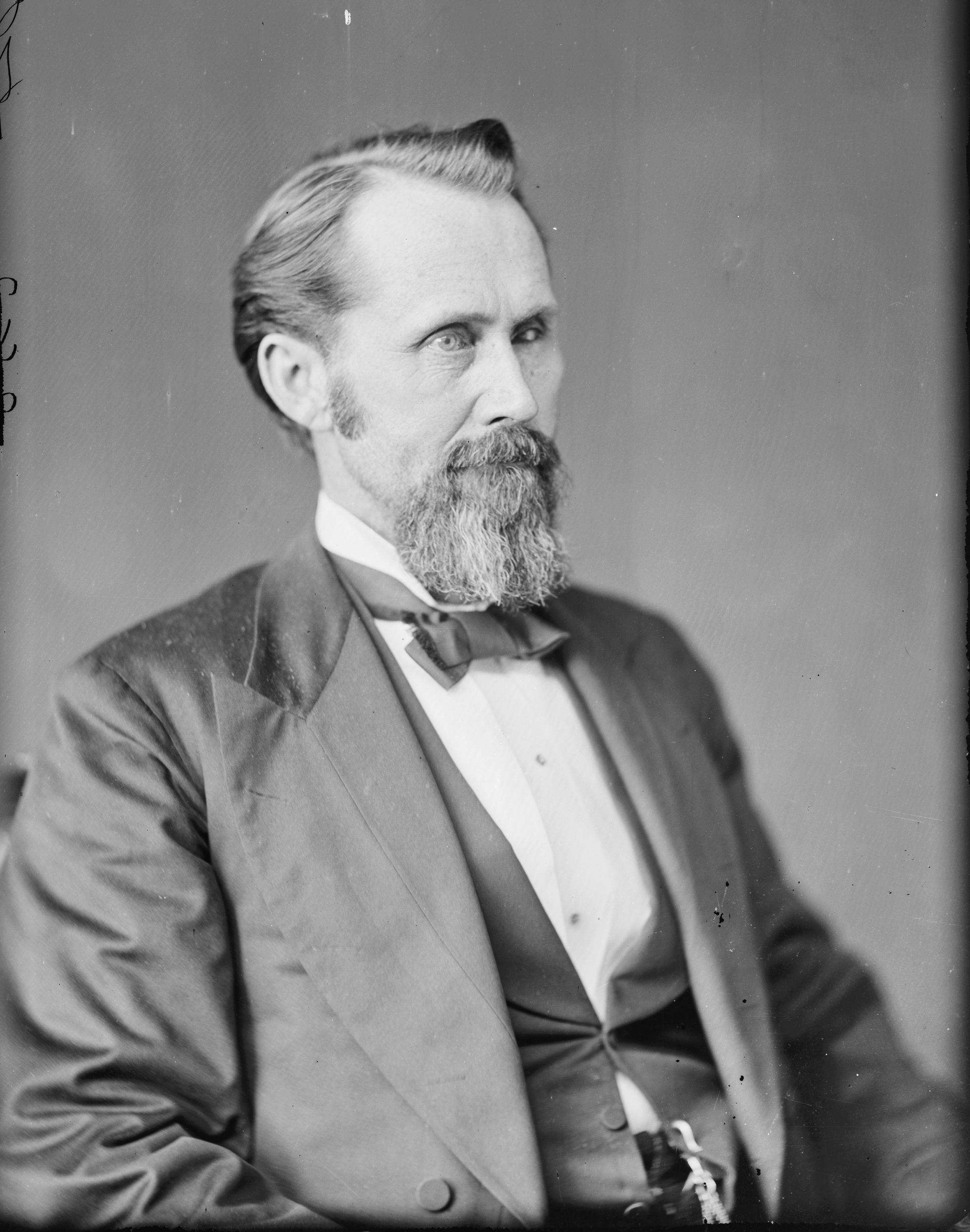

Member of the U.S. House of Representatives from Tennessee's 9th district
- In office March 4, 1875 – March 3, 1879
- Preceded by: Barbour Lewis
- Succeeded by: Charles B. Simonton

Member of the Tennessee House of Representatives
- In office 1857–1859

Member of the Tennessee Senate
- In office 1891–1893

Personal details
- Born: November 8, 1832 Christmasville, Tennessee, U.S.
- Died: June 7, 1903 (aged 70) Gardner, Tennessee, U.S.
- Party: Democratic
- Education: Cumberland School of Law
- Profession: lawyer; politician

William Parker Caldwell (November 8, 1832 – June 7, 1903) was an American politician and a member of the United States House of Representatives for the 9th congressional district of Tennessee.

== Biography ==
Caldwell was born in Christmasville in Carroll County, Tennessee, on November 8, 1832. He attended school at McLemoresville, Tennessee, and at Princeton, Kentucky. He studied law at Cumberland School of Law at Cumberland University in Lebanon, Tennessee, and was admitted to the bar in 1853.

== Career ==
Caldwell practiced in Dresden and Union City, Tennessee. He served in the Tennessee House of Representatives from 1857 to 1859. He was a presidential elector on the Democratic ticket of Douglas and Johnson in 1860. He was a delegate to the Democratic National Convention in 1868. When the town of Gardner, Tennessee, incorporated in 1869, he became its first mayor.

Elected as a Democrat to the Forty-fourth and Forty-fifth Congresses, he served from March 4, 1875, to March 3, 1879. He was not a candidate for re-election to the Forty-sixth Congress in 1878. He resumed the practice of law in Gardner, Tennessee, and served in the Tennessee Senate from 1891 to 1893.

== Death ==
Caldwell died in Gardner, Tennessee on June 7, 1903. He is interred at Caldwell Cemetery. His house in Gardner is listed on the National Register of Historic Places.

U.S. House of Representatives
Preceded by Barbour Lewis	Member of the U.S. House of Representatives from Tennessee's 9th congressional district 1875–1879	Succeeded by Charles B. Simonton
