= Isaac Van Zandt =

American politician (1813–1847)

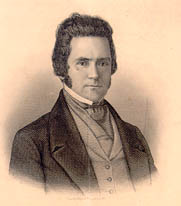
- Born: July 10, 1813; Franklin County, Tennessee, U.S.
- Died: October 11, 1847 (aged 34); Houston, Texas, U.S.
- Occupations: Planter, politician
- Spouse: Frances Lipscomb
- Children: K. M. Van Zandt
- Relatives: Townes Van Zandt

Isaac Van Zandt (July 10, 1813 – October 11, 1847) was a political leader in the Republic of Texas. Van Zandt County, Texas, was named in his honor.

== Early life ==
Van Zandt was born on July 10, 1813, in Franklin County, Tennessee, to Jacob and Mary Isaacs Van Zandt. The Van Zandt family had migrated to America from the Netherlands prior to the American Revolutionary War.

== Career ==
Van Zandt went into a joint business venture with his father by opening a store. He later moved to Coffeeville, Mississippi, where he opened his own store. After experiencing financial difficulties after the depression of 1837, Van Zandt became interested in a debate society, which enabled him to use his natural talent for public speaking. This spurred an interest in law and within a year, he was a member of the Mississippi bar.

Van Zandt came to the Republic of Texas in 1838 and settled in Elysian Fields in what was then Panola County. In 1839, he moved to what is now Marshall, Texas.

Van Zandt was the representative of Harrison County in the House of Representatives of the Republic of Texas from 1840 until 1842, when Sam Houston appointed him Republic of Texas chargé d'affaires in Washington, DC. In 1841, Van Zandt donated land, along with Peter Whetestone, to create a county seat for Harrison County. Van Zandt named the new city in honor of the chief justice of the U.S. Supreme Court, John Marshall. As the Republic of Texas ambassador to the United States, Van Zandt was instrumental in crafting the annexation treaty of the Republic of Texas to the U.S.

Van Zandt returned to Texas in 1845 to serve as a delegate to the Texas state constitutional convention.

== Personal life, death, and legacy ==
Van Zandt married Frances Lipscomb in 1833.

Van Zandt died during a yellow fever epidemic in Houston while campaigning for governor in 1847. The Van Zandt family donated their plantation as the site for the College of Marshall (now East Texas Baptist University) in 1912. In 1936, a memorial was constructed in Canton, the seat of Van Zandt County. Van Zandt was the father of Texas politician and businessman K. M. Van Zandt, and his sister, Ida Van Zandt Jarvis, was a generous benefactor and the first female trustee of Texas Christian University. Isaac was also the great-great-grandfather of Meredith Attwell Baker, and the great-great-great-grandfather of country music songwriter and performer Townes Van Zandt.
