= Fort Palmetto =

- U.S. National Register of Historic Places
- Location within South Carolina Location within the United States
- Location: Christ Church Parish, Hamlin Sound, South Carolina
- Coordinates: 32°49′23″N 79°45′56″W
- Area: 1 acre (0.40 ha)
- Built: 1861
- MPS: Civil War Defenses of Charleston TR
- NRHP reference No.: 82003842
- Added to NRHP: August 11, 1982

Fort Palmetto is a historic artillery battery located at Christ Church Parish, Hamlin Sound, Charleston County, South Carolina. It was built in late 1861, and was at the easternmost end of the Christ Church Parish line of defense. At the end of the war this battery mounted one nine-inch gun and two rifled thirty-two pounders. The earthen redoubt measures approximately 160 feet long and 80 feet wide. It has a 15 foot high parapet wall and a powder magazine about 25 feet in height.

It was listed on the National Register of Historic Places in 1982.

Fort Palmetto is now part of Fort Palmetto Park, a Town of Mount Pleasant park which opened in 2015 and is located within the subdivision community of Oyster Point.
