= Gardner, Tennessee =

- Unincorporated community
- Location within Tennessee Location within the United States
- Coordinates: 36°21′30″N 88°53′53″W
- Country: United States
- State: Tennessee
- County: Weakley
- Elevation: 364 ft (111 m)
- Time zone: UTC-6 (Central (CST))
  - Summer (DST): UTC-5 (CDT)
- Area code: 731
- GNIS feature ID: 1285157

Gardner (also Gardner Station, Gardners Station, Gardner's, Gardnersville) is a former town, now an unincorporated community, in western Weakley County, Tennessee, United States.

== History ==
Gardner was founded in 1856 by its namesake, Colonel John Almus Gardner. He was the first president of the Nashville and Northwestern Railroad (a predecessor to the Nashville, Chattanooga and St. Louis Railway) and he owned the land on which the town was established.

The town had a period of prosperity in the years after the Civil War. As the only significant town between Dresden and Union City, it was a business center for western Weakley County. It became an incorporated municipality in 1869, with lawyer William Parker Caldwell serving as its first mayor. Caldwell was later to become a U.S. Congressman, serving in the U.S. House of Representatives from 1875 to 1879.

Initial plans for the north-south Mississippi Railroad called for the rail line to pass through Gardner, but in 1873 the planned route was shifted from Gardner to Martin. Gardner declined after 1873; many local businesses relocated to Martin.

William Parker Caldwell's home in Gardner is still standing and is listed on the National Register of Historic Places.
