= Rice Alexander Pierce =

American lawyer and politician

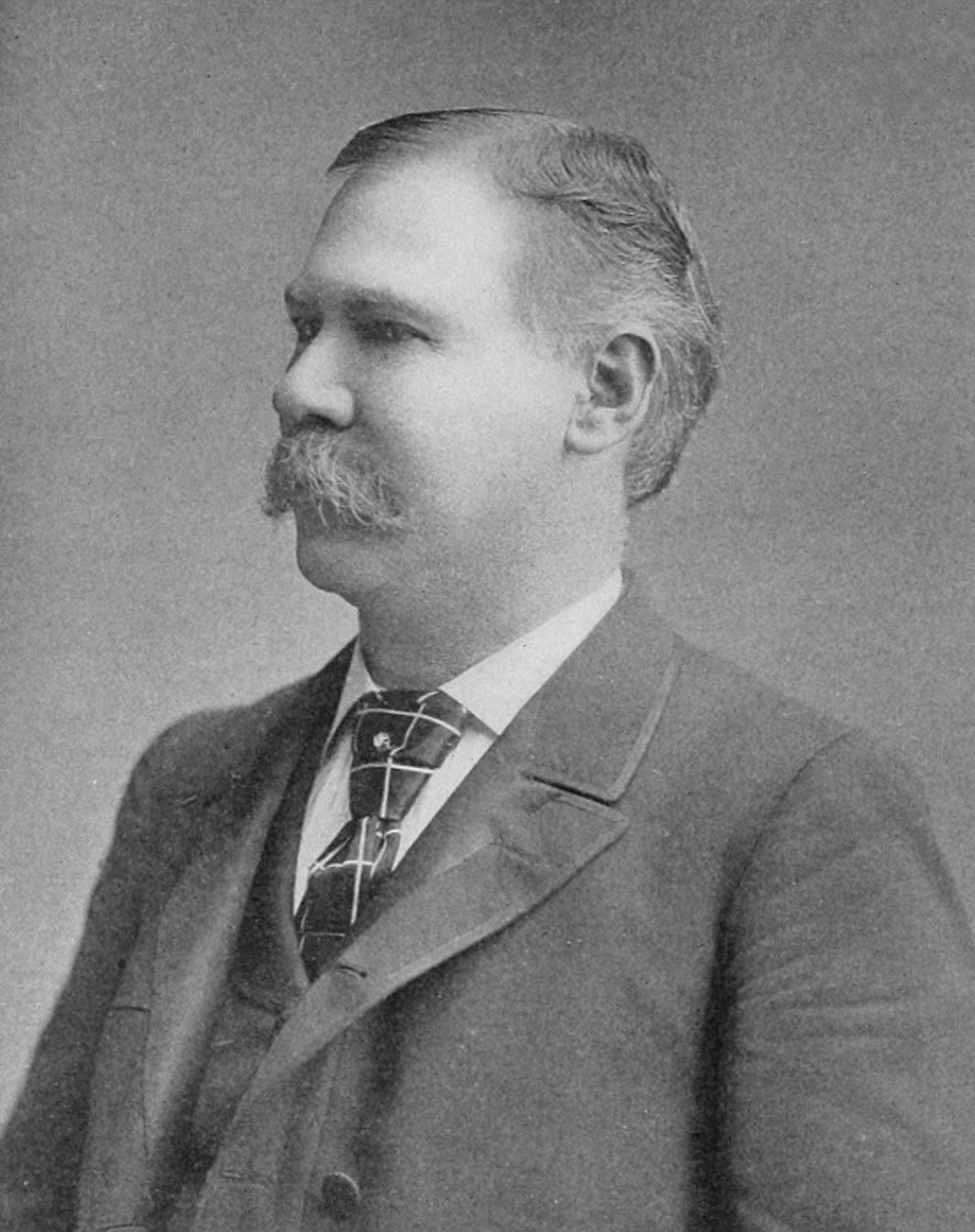

Member of the U.S. House of Representatives from Tennessee's 9th district
- In office March 4, 1883 – March 3, 1885
- Preceded by: Charles B. Simonton
- Succeeded by: Presley T. Glass
- In office March 4, 1889 – March 3, 1893
- Preceded by: Presley T. Glass
- Succeeded by: James C. McDearmon
- In office March 4, 1897 – March 3, 1905
- Preceded by: James C. McDearmon
- Succeeded by: Finis J. Garrett

Personal details
- Born: July 3, 1848 Dresden, Tennessee, United States
- Died: July 12, 1936 (aged 88) Union City, Tennessee
- Party: Democratic
- Spouse: Mary Hunter Pierce
- Profession: Attorney; politician

Military service
- Allegiance: Confederate States of America
- Branch/service: Confederate States Army
- Unit: Eighth Tennessee Cavalry
- Battles/wars: American Civil War

Rice Alexander Pierce (July 3, 1848 – July 12, 1936) was an American politician and a member of the United States House of Representatives for the 9th congressional district of Tennessee.

== Biography ==
Pierce was born on July 3, 1848, in Dresden, Tennessee, in Weakley County. He attended the common schools in Tennessee, and during the Civil War he served in the Confederate States Army with the Eighth Tennessee Cavalry. After the war, he attended school in London, Ontario, Canada and studied law in Halifax, North Carolina. He was admitted to the bar of the supreme court in Raleigh, North Carolina, in 1868.

== Career ==
In 1869, Pierce commenced practice in Union City, Tennessee, in Obion County. He served as mayor in 1872. He was elected the district attorney general of the twelfth judicial circuit in 1874. He was re-elected in 1878 and served until 1883.

Elected as a Democrat to the Forty-eighth Congress, Pierce served from March 4, 1883, to March 3, 1885. He was an unsuccessful candidate for renomination in 1884, but was elected to the Fifty-first and Fifty-second Congresses, and served from March 4, 1889, to March 3, 1893. Again unsuccessful in 1892 to the Fifty-third Congress, he was elected to the Fifty-fifth and to the three succeeding Congresses. He served from March 4, 1897, to March 3, 1905.

When Pierce was an unsuccessful candidate for re-election to the Fifty-ninth Congress in 1904, he resumed the practice of law in Union City, Tennessee. He was chairman of the state Democratic State campaign committee in 1929.

== Death ==
Pierce died in Union City, Tennessee, on July 12, 1936 (age 88 years, 9 days). He was interred in the City Cemetery.

U.S. House of Representatives
Preceded by Charles B. Simonton	Member of the U.S. House of Representatives from Tennessee's 9th congressional district 1883–1885	Succeeded by Presley T. Glass
Preceded by Presley T. Glass	Member of the U.S. House of Representatives from Tennessee's 9th congressional district 1889–1893	Succeeded by James C. McDearmon
Preceded by James C. McDearmon	Member of the U.S. House of Representatives from Tennessee's 9th congressional district 1897–1905	Succeeded by Finis J. Garrett
