= K. M. Van Zandt =

Commander-in-Chief of the United Confederate Veterans from 1919 to 1921

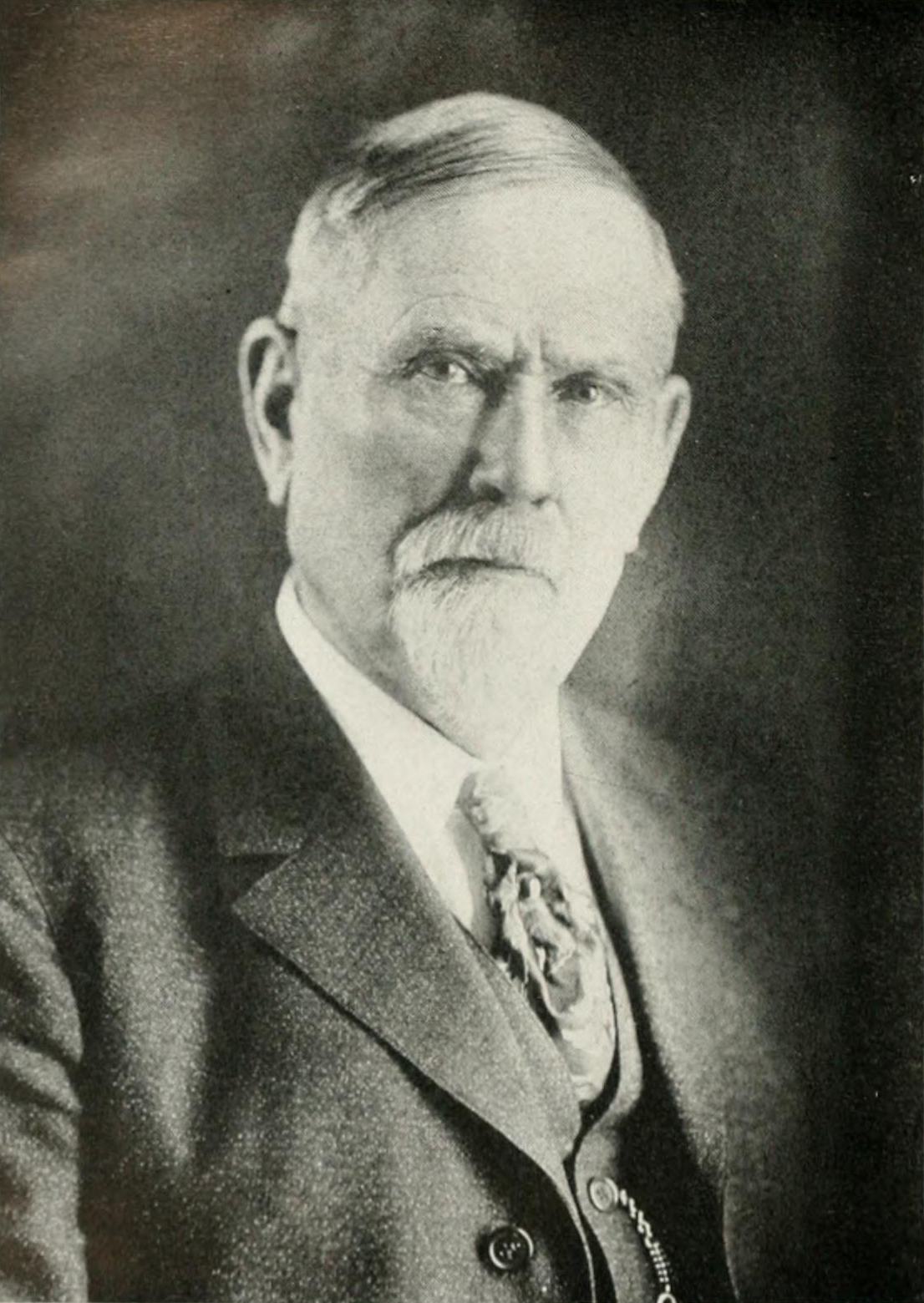

9th Commander-in-Chief of the United Confederate Veterans
- In office 1919 – 1921
- Preceded by: George P. Harrison Jr.
- Succeeded by: Julian S. Carr

Member of the Texas House of Representatives from the 21st district
- In office 1873 – 1874

Personal details
- Born: Khleber Miller Van Zandt; November 7, 1836 Franklin County, Tennessee, U.S.
- Died: March 19, 1930 (aged 93) Fort Worth, Texas, U.S.
- Resting place: Oakwood Cemetery, Fort Worth, Texas, U.S. Block 29, Lot 20-W1/2
- Party: Democratic
- Children: 14
- Parent: Isaac Van Zandt (father)
- Education: Franklin College
- Occupation: Lawyer, merchant, banker

Military service
- Allegiance: Confederate States
- Years of service: 1861–1865
- Rank: Major
- Unit: 7th Texas Infantry
- Battles: American Civil War; Battle of Fort Donelson (POW); Siege of Port Hudson

Khleber Miller Van Zandt (November 7, 1836 – March 19, 1930) was an American politician, lawyer, merchant, and banker who served as the ninth commander-in-chief of the United Confederate Veterans from 1919 to 1921.

== Early life and education ==
Van Zandt was born on November 7, 1836. His father was Isaac Van Zandt. His mother was Frances Lipscomb. Van Zandt was educated at Franklin College in Tennessee.

== Military service ==
Van Zandt served as an officer in the 7th Texas Infantry during the American Civil War. Captured following the Battle of Fort Donelson, he was detained as a prisoner of war (POW). His slave, Jack, served him throughout the war, even while imprisoned.

== Career ==
Van Zandt settled in Fort Worth in 1865, and operated a dry-goods business and later became president of both a railway construction company, and a bank, the Fort Worth National Bank. He was a Democrat, serving as a member of the Texas House of Representatives from 1873 to 1874. He was the prime mover of the founding of the Confederate Reunion Grounds in Lakeside, Texas, later called Confederate Park.

== Personal life and death ==
The 1860 census shows that Van Zandt enslaved nine individuals. After the American Civil War he joined in the United Confederate Veterans (U.C.V.), serving as the commander of the First Brigade, Texas Division and the Commander of the Army of Trans-Mississippi. In 1919, he was elected the ninth Commander-In-Chief of the U.C.V.. Van Zandt died on March 19, 1930, in Fort Worth, Texas.
