= Presley T. Glass =

American politician and lawyer (1824–1902)

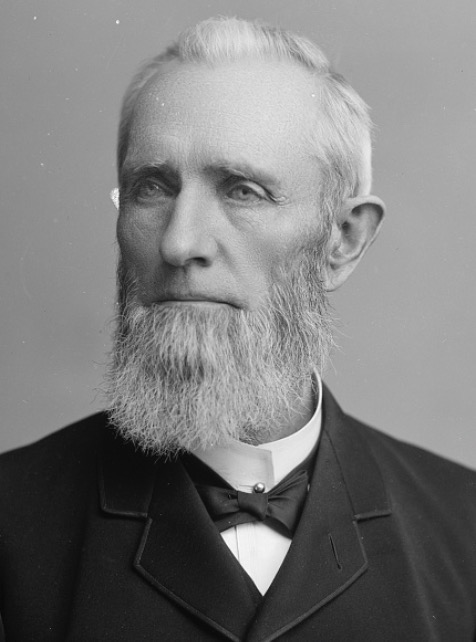
- Portrait of Glass by Charles Milton Bell, taken between 1873 and 1890

Member of the U.S. House of Representatives from Tennessee's 9th district
- In office March 4, 1885 – March 3, 1889
- Preceded by: Rice A. Pierce
- Succeeded by: Rice A. Pierce

Member of the Tennessee House of Representatives
- In office 1848
- Constituency: Weakley County
- In office 1882

Personal details
- Born: October 18, 1824 Halifax, Virginia, US
- Died: October 9, 1902 (aged 77) Ripley, Tennessee, US
- Party: Democratic
- Education: Lexington (Kentucky) Law School
- Profession: Politician, lawyer

Military service
- Allegiance: Confederate States of America
- Branch/service: Confederate States Army
- Rank: Colonel
- Battles/wars: American Civil War

Presley Thornton Glass (October 18, 1824 – October 9, 1902) was an American politician and lawyer. A Democrat, he was a member of the United States House of Representatives from Tennessee.

== Biography ==
Glass was born on October 18, 1824, in Halifax, Virginia. In 1828, he and his family moved to Weakley County, Tennessee. An attendee of Dresden Academy, he completed a course at the University of Kentucky Rosenberg College of Law.

Glass read law, and in 1847, was admitted to the bar. He moved to Ripley in 1849, where he began practicing law. He later worked as a merchant. He owned slaves. At age 18, he was made colonel of a militia, and during the American Civil War, was a commissary of the Confederate States Army.

Glass was a Democrat. In 1848, he represented Weakley County in the Tennessee House of Representatives; he again served in 1882. On September 20, 1884, he was nominated for the 1884 United States House of Representatives election in Tennessee, with his nomination causing controversy due to not being decided by a two-thirds majority. He was a member of the House, from March 4, 1885, to March 3, 1889, representing Tennessee's 9th district. He was not nominated for the following election. Ideologically, he was liberal.

Glass was Christian. On May 5, 1889, his house was burgled, with several gold watches and some loose cash being stolen. He died on October 9, 1902, aged 77, in Ripley, and was buried at Maplewood Cemetery, in Ripley.

U.S. House of Representatives
| Preceded by Rice A. Pierce | Member of the U.S. House of Representatives from Tennessee's 9th congressional district 1885–1889 | Succeeded by Rice A. Pierce |
