= Vanzant, Kentucky =

Unincorporated community in Kentucky, United States

- Unincorporated community
- Location within Kentucky Location within the United States
- Coordinates: 37°38′35″N 86°36′45″W
- Country: United States
- State: Kentucky
- County: Breckinridge
- Elevation: 522 ft (159 m)
- Time zone: UTC-6 (Central (CST))
  - Summer (DST): UTC-5 (CDT)
- Area code: 270
- GNIS feature ID: 509275

Vanzant is an unincorporated community in Breckinridge County, Kentucky, United States. Vanzant is located on Harris Fork in the southwest corner of Breckinridge County, 12.6 miles (20.3 km) southwest of Hardinsburg.

The community had a post office but it was closed on September 20, 1985.
