= Christmasville, Haywood County, Tennessee =

Christmasville, Tennessee
- Unincorporated community
- Location within Tennessee Location within the United States
- Coordinates: 35°40′58″N 89°17′42″W
- Country: United States
- State: Tennessee
- County: Haywood
- Elevation: 322 ft (98 m)
- Time zone: UTC-6 (Central (CST))
  - Summer (DST): UTC-5 (CDT)
- Area code: 731
- GNIS feature ID: 1314844

Christmasville is an unincorporated community in Haywood County, Tennessee, United States. Christmasville is 6.4 miles (10.3 km) north-northwest of Brownsville.

Christmasville is named for the Christmas family who lived there from the turn of the 20th century until around 1925. The local Castellaw family remained, giving way to the community's lesser-used name Castellaw Corner. By the early 1920s the community had three grocery stores in operation, one of which was run by the Christmas family. The Christmas family also owned and operated a cotton gin, grist mill, and sawmill. The other stores were operated by locals Simon Pittman and Sam Dedmon. The gin and sawmill burned down in 1922, spurring the family's relocation to nearby Brownsville. The stores changed hands throughout the century until 1973 when the last of which closed permanently. A second sawmill saw operation in the area between 1967 and 1982.

The community was previously home to two schools, Hickory Grove and Lone Oak, which offered classes through the 10th grade. The first Lone Oak building was destroyed by a turned while the second one burned down. The third building still stands and has been moved from its original site and is now used as a private residence. Hickory Grove School discontinued classes in the 1960s, after which the building was sold and moved from the community.
