= Van Sant Airport =

Van Sant Airport (Vansant Airport)
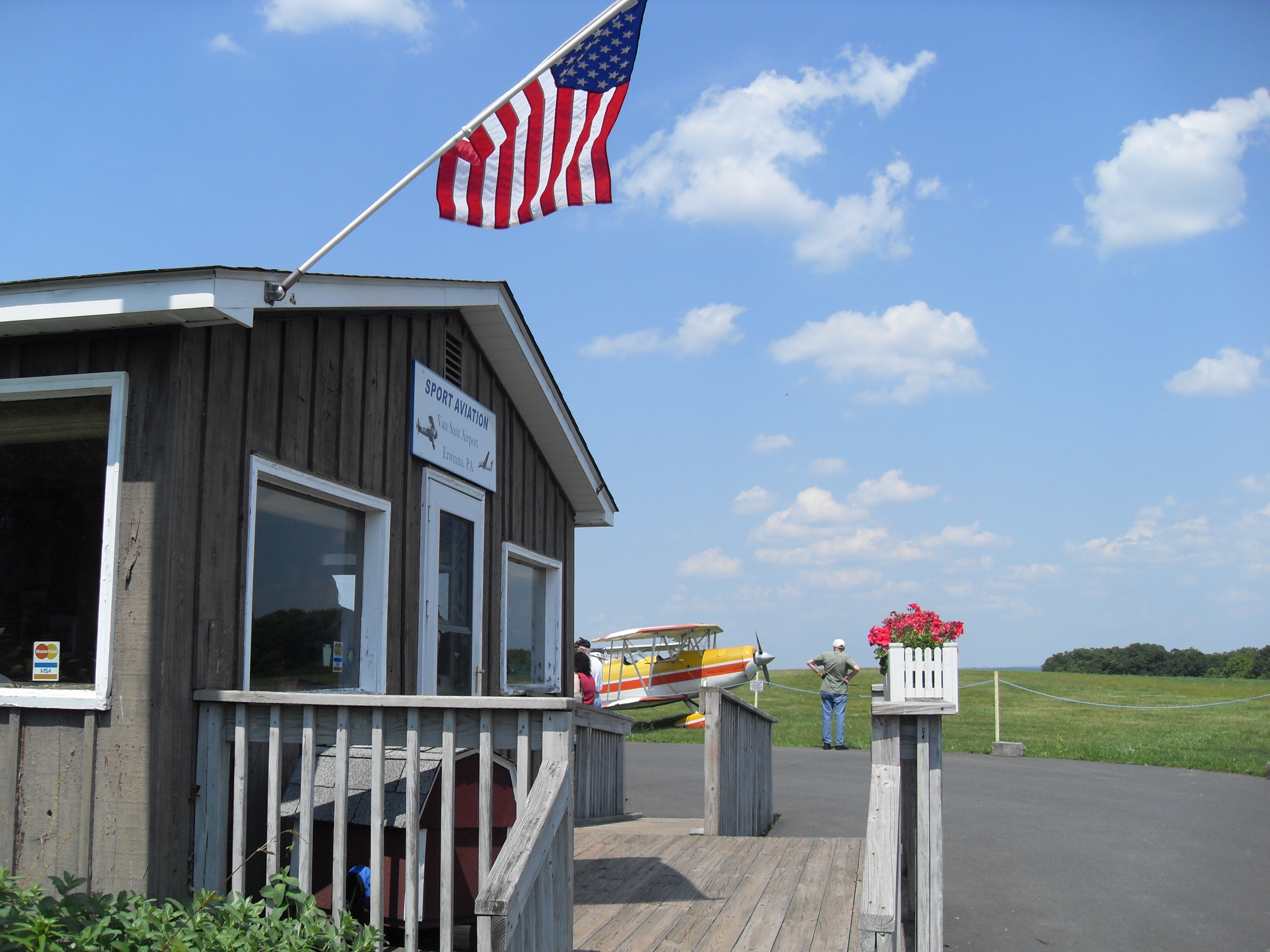
- IATA: none; ICAO: none; FAA LID: 9N1

Summary
- Airport type: Public
- Owner/Operator: Bucks County Airport Authority
- Location: Erwinna, Pennsylvania
- Elevation AMSL: 390 ft / 119 m
- Coordinates: 40°29′03″N 075°05′59″W
- Website: www.VanSantAirport.com

Map
- Location of airport in Pennsylvania 9N1 (the United States)

Runways
Direction	Length		Surface
Direction	ft	m	Surface
5G/23G	1,340	408	Turf
7/25	3,058	932	Turf

Statistics (2022)
- Aircraft operations: 4,515
- Based aircraft: 52 (40 single engine aircraft, 12 gliders)
- Source: Federal Aviation Administration

Vansant Airport or Van Sant Airport (FAA LID: 9N1) is a public use airport located in Bucks County, Pennsylvania, United States and owned by the Bucks County Airport Authority. It is two nautical miles (3.7 km) southwest of the central business district of Erwinna, Pennsylvania.

== History ==
In 1945, John Van Sant (born 1912) bought the Silver Star Airport in Langhorne, Pennsylvania, renamed it to The Old Star Airport, and started his own business, Van Sant Flying Service. The business offered crop dusting and flight training. Van Sant dealt in aircraft and also bought US government surplus parts. In 1957, he moved his business to Doylestown, Pennsylvania. In 1960, he moved to Erwinna, Pennsylvania where he founded and owned the Van Sant Airport. In 2003, the 198.5 acres (0.803 km^{2}) property was sold to the county for almost US$3 million. Today, the airport is a landmark for Classic Biplane rides, vintage airplanes, and sailplane operations. It is part of the Bucks County park system. The Bucks County Airport Authority currently maintains the airport, and facilities on the field are leased to Bird Of Paradise, a fixed-base operator (FBO). The Soaring Tigers, a sailplane nonprofit gliding club, operates from the airport and provides glider flight instruction to club members.

== Facilities and aircraft ==
The airport covers an area of 167 acres (68 ha) at an elevation of 390 feet (120 m) above mean sea level. It has two runways with turf surfaces:: 7/25 is 3,058 by 120 feet (932 by 37 m) and 5G/23G is 1,340 by 200 feet (408 by 61 m).

For the 12-month period ending May 10, 2022, the airport had 4,515 aircraft operations including 15 military operations. At that time there were 52 aircraft based at this airport: 40 single-engine, and 12 gliders.

As of late 2022, The Soaring Tigers bases three sailplanes at the airport, including a Schweizer SGS 1-34, Schweizer SGS 1-26B, and a two-place Schweizer SGS 2-33A. The airport provides glider aerotows.

== See also ==
- List of airports in Pennsylvania
