= Christmasville, Carroll County, Tennessee =

Christmasville, Tennessee
- Unincorporated community
- Location within Tennessee Location within the United States
- Coordinates: 36°05′36″N 88°38′51″W
- Country: United States
- State: Tennessee
- County: Carroll
- Elevation: 430 ft (130 m)
- Time zone: UTC-6 (Central (CST))
  - Summer (DST): UTC-5 (CDT)
- Area code: 731
- GNIS feature ID: 1280534

Christmasville is an unincorporated community in Carroll County, Tennessee, United States. Christmasville is located on Tennessee State Route 190, 7.7 miles (12.4 km) west-southwest of McKenzie.

== Notable person ==
- William Parker Caldwell, Tennessee politician, was born in Christmasville.
