= National Register of Historic Places listings in Gibson County, Tennessee =

Location of Gibson County in Tennessee

This is a list of the National Register of Historic Places listings in Gibson County, Tennessee.

This is intended to be a complete list of the properties and districts on the National Register of Historic Places in Gibson County, Tennessee, United States. Latitude and longitude coordinates are provided for many National Register properties and districts; these locations may be seen together in a map.

There are 19 properties and districts listed on the National Register in the county, and one former listing.

Contents: Counties in Tennessee
Anderson – Bedford – Benton – Bledsoe – Blount – Bradley – Campbell – Cannon – Carroll – Carter – Cheatham – Chester – Claiborne – Clay – Cocke – Coffee – Crockett – Cumberland – Davidson – Decatur – DeKalb – Dickson – Dyer – Fayette – Fentress – Franklin – Gibson – Giles – Grainger – Greene – Grundy – Hamblen – Hamilton – Hancock – Hardeman – Hardin – Hawkins – Haywood – Henderson – Henry – Hickman – Houston – Humphreys – Jackson – Jefferson – Johnson – Knox – Lake – Lauderdale – Lawrence – Lewis – Lincoln – Loudon – Macon – Madison – Marion – Marshall – Maury – McMinn – McNairy – Meigs – Monroe – Montgomery – Moore – Morgan – Obion – Overton – Perry – Pickett – Polk – Putnam – Rhea – Roane – Robertson – Rutherford – Scott – Sequatchie – Sevier – Shelby – Smith – Stewart – Sullivan – Sumner – Tipton – Trousdale – Unicoi – Union – Van Buren – Warren – Washington – Wayne – Weakley – White – Williamson – Wilson

This National Park Service list is complete through NPS recent listings posted May 2, 2025.

== Current listings ==
	Name on the Register	Image	Date listed	Location	City or town	Description
1	Bonds House	Bonds House	August 30, 2010 (#10000473)	204 S. 19th Ave. 35°49′06″N 88°54′35″W	Humboldt	
2	Booker T. Motel	Booker T. Motel	July 25, 2018 (#100002750)	607 W Main St. 35°49′12″N 88°55′20″W	Humboldt	
3	Browning House		June 28, 1974 (#74001912)	East of Milan on the Milan Army Ammunition Plant; 35°55′27″N 88°43′10″W	Milan	
4	Dodson House	Dodson House	March 25, 1982 (#82003969)	119 N. 17th Ave. 35°49′14″N 88°54′47″W	Humboldt	
5	First Methodist Episcopal Church, South	First Methodist Episcopal Church, South	July 23, 2008 (#08000702)	200 N. 12th Ave. 35°49′15″N 88°55′08″W	Humboldt	
6	Julius Freed House	Julius Freed House	April 5, 1994 (#94000301)	Eaton St. west of the Gibson County Courthouse; 35°58′49″N 88°56′18″W	Trenton	
7	Gibson County Courthouse	Gibson County Courthouse	November 7, 1976 (#76001777)	Court Sq. 35°58′51″N 88°56′29″W	Trenton	Built in 1899
8	Gibson County Training School	Gibson County Training School	March 12, 2012 (#12000117)	1041 S. Harris St. 35°58′51″N 88°56′29″W	Milan	
9	Medina City Hall	Medina City Hall	July 7, 2004 (#04000674)	140 S. 2nd St. 35°48′16″N 88°46′36″W	Medina	
10	Mt. Zion Negro School	Mt. Zion Negro School	November 13, 2017 (#100001823)	99 Mt. Zion Rd. 36°05′43″N 88°53′13″W	Bradford vicinity	
11	Oakland Cemetery	Oakland Cemetery	March 20, 2007 (#07000186)	800 Brownsville St. 35°58′17″N 88°56′40″W	Trenton	
12	Peabody High School	Peabody High School	November 23, 1984 (#84000326)	S. College St. 35°58′10″N 88°56′31″W	Trenton	
13	Senter-Rooks House	Senter-Rooks House	July 9, 1980 (#80003797)	2227 Main St. 35°49′15″N 88°54′22″W	Humboldt	
14	Sitka School	Sitka School	March 27, 2020 (#100005137)	17 Napoleon Luther Rd. 35°51′48″N 88°45′37″W	Milan	
15	Skullbone Store	Skullbone Store	November 18, 1999 (#99001369)	1 Shade's Bridge Rd. 36°05′02″N 88°45′41″W	Skullbone	
16	Col. Robert Z. Taylor House	Col. Robert Z. Taylor House	April 12, 1982 (#82003970)	1008 S. College St. 35°58′05″N 88°56′31″W	Trenton	
17	Trenton Historic District	Trenton Historic District	April 15, 1982 (#82003971)	High, College, and Church Sts. 35°58′34″N 88°56′30″W	Trenton	
18	US Post Office	US Post Office	July 9, 1987 (#87001169)	382 S. Main St. 35°55′02″N 88°45′51″W	Milan	
19	US Post Office	US Post Office	September 23, 1988 (#88001576)	200 S. College St. 35°58′55″N 88°56′30″W	Trenton	

== Former listings ==
	Name on the Register	Image	Date listed	Date removed	Location	City or town	Description
1	Union Central School		July 5, 1985 (#85001490)	November 4, 2024	38 Union Central Rd. 35°57′54″N 88°47′04″W	Milan	Demolished

== See also ==
- List of National Historic Landmarks in Tennessee
- National Register of Historic Places listings in Tennessee
