= Jackson metropolitan area, Tennessee =

Metropolitan area in United States

Jackson metropolitan area Jackson, Tennessee Metropolitan Area
- Metropolitan Statistical Area
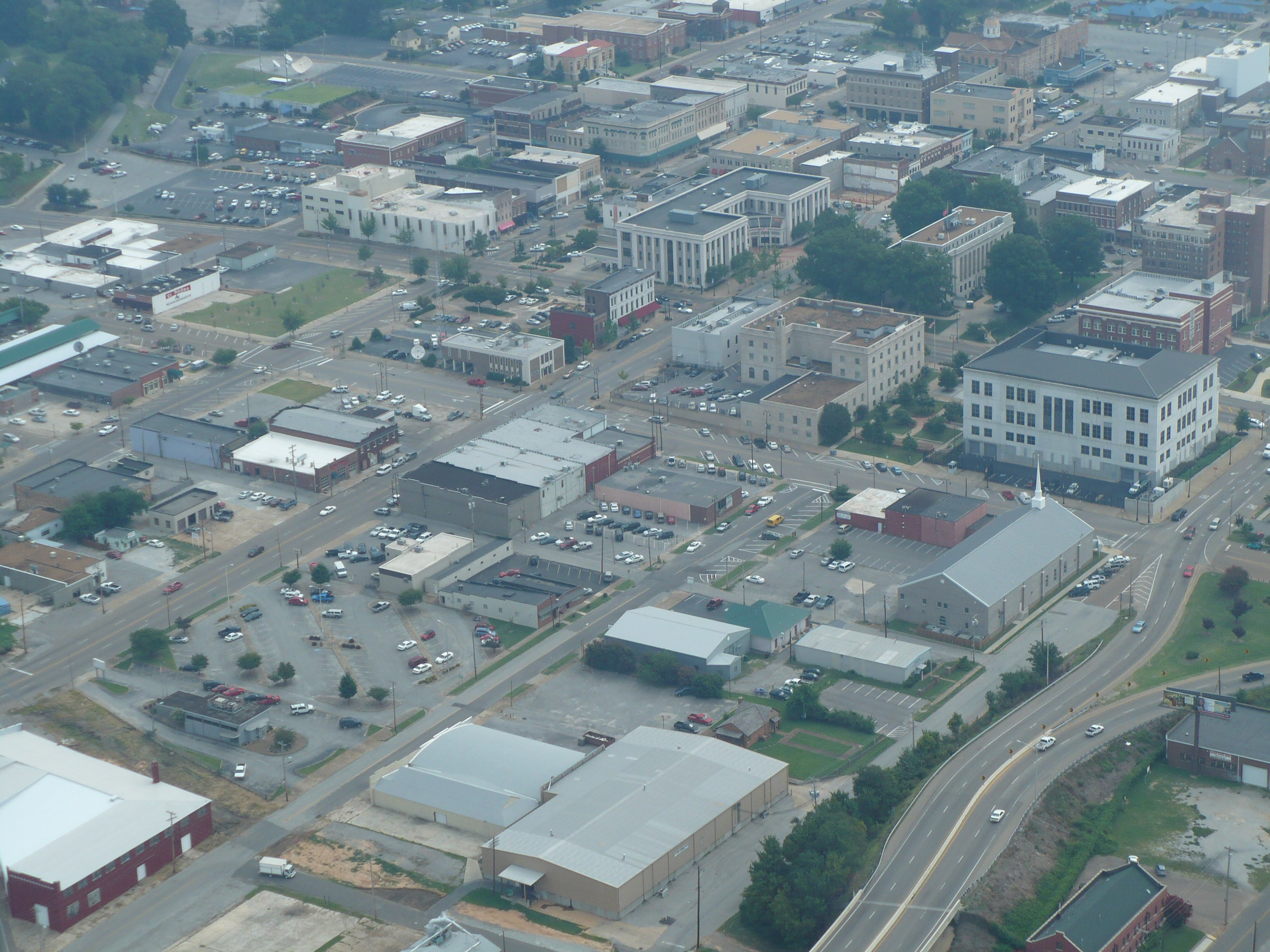
- Aerial View of Jackson
Interactive Map of Jackson, TN MSA
City of Jackson
Jackson, TN MSA
- Country: United States
- State: Tennessee
- Principal city: Jackson

Population (2025)
  - Total: 185,920

GDP
  - Total: $11.47 Billion (2023)
- Time zone: UTC−6 (CST)
  - Summer (DST): UTC−5 (CDT)

The Jackson metropolitan statistical area, as defined by the United States Census Bureau, is an area consisting of four counties - Madison, Chester, Gibson, and Crockett - in western Tennessee, anchored by the city of Jackson. As of the 2020 census, the MSA had a population of 180,509.

The area was first recognized as the Jackson, TN MSA in June 1985, initially composed solely of Madison County. It was temporarily abolished in December 1992 after falling below population thresholds in the 1990 Census data, but was quickly reinstated in June 1993.

From 1993 to 2011, the Jackson MSA remained consistently defined as only Madison County. The 2003 federal redefinition introduced Micropolitan Statistical Areas, allowing Haywood County to be designated as the Brownsville MSA, and significant commuting ties led to the formation of the Jackson-Brownsville Combined Statistical Area (CSA).

After 2011, updated data from the 2010 Census resulted in a crucial expansion: the Jackson MSA officially incorporated Chester, Crockett, and Gibson counties. Subsequently, around 2020, the Brownsville CSA was dissolved due to its core urban population dropping below the 10,000 minimum, meaning the Jackson-Brownsville CSA ceased to exist as a formal statistical entity.

== Counties ==
- Chester
- Crockett
- Gibson
- Madison

== Communities ==
=== Place with more than 50,000 inhabitants ===
- Jackson (Principal city)

=== Places with 5,000 to 10,000 ===
- Henderson
- Humboldt
- Medina
- Milan

=== Places with less than 5,000 inhabitants ===
- Alamo
- Bells
- Bradford
- Dyer
- Enville
- Friendship
- Gadsden
- Gibson
- Kenton (Partial)
- Maury City
- Medon
- Milledgeville (partial)
- Rutherford
- Silerton (partial)
- Three Way
- Trenton
- Yorkville

=== Unincorporated communities ===
- Beech Bluff
- Brazil
- Crockett Mills
- Deanburg
- Denmark
- Eaton
- Five Points
- Frog Jump
- Fruitvale
- Graball
- Hopewell
- Idlewild
- Jacks Creek
- Neboville
- Mercer
- Oakfield
- Pinson
- Skullbone
- Spring Creek
- Spring Hill
- Sweet Lips

== Economy ==
The economy of the Jackson, TN Metropolitan Statistical Area is anchored by robust healthcare and manufacturing sectors, serving as the primary commercial and industrial hub for West Tennessee. Its strategic location near Interstate 40 and major rail lines facilitates a significant logistics and transportation sector, which supports operations for companies such as UPS.

Healthcare represents the largest employment cluster, driven by regional systems including West Tennessee Healthcare and Community Health Systems. The manufacturing base is substantial, hosting facilities for international corporations such as Toyota Motor Manufacturing, Kellanova (Pringles), and Stanley Black & Decker.

Six local colleges and universities contribute to workforce development. Economic indicators point to a stable labor market; the unemployment rate was approximately 4.6% as of mid-2025. The region benefits from a cost of living estimated to be 13.8% below the U.S. average.

== Politics ==
=== Congressional districting ===
The Jackson-area counties are located in West Tennessee's congressional map and fall largely within the 8th Congressional District following the 2022 redistricting map, the 8th is a Republican-leaning seat represented by Rep. David Kustoff. Redistricting in Tennessee (2021–2022) kept West Tennessee's counties in districts that have been reliably Republican in recent cycles.

== Crime ==
The Jackson Metropolitan Area was frequently ranked among the most dangerous in the U.S. in the mid-to-late 2000s, ranking 9th in 2007 and 13th in 2010 according to Morgan Quitno's rankings.

By 2020, its ranking improved to approximately 38th worst nationally with 624.6 violent crimes per 100,000 residents, the second-highest metro rate in Tennessee. More recent data for late 2024 and early 2025 indicated a decrease in overall crime and gunshot incidents within the city of Jackson, though homicides trended upward. In May 2024, the city's violent crime rate was estimated at 1,140 per 100,000, higher than state and national averages but below Memphis's rate.

== Demographics ==
Historical population
Year	Pop.	±%
1900	108,185	—
1910	110,939	+2.5%
1920	118,226	+6.6%
1930	128,790	+8.9%
1940	132,008	+2.5%
1950	138,373	+4.8%
1960	135,224	−2.3%
1970	136,352	+0.8%
1980	152,636	+11.9%
1990	153,571	+0.6%
2000	171,592	+11.7%
2010	179,679	+4.7%
2020	179,741	+0.0%
2025	185,920	+3.4%

As of the 2020 Census, the Jackson, TN Metropolitan Statistical Area (MSA) had a population of 180,509. The racial composition was approximately 64% White, 26% African American, 1% Asian, 0.4% Native American, and 5% from two or more races, with about 5% identifying as Hispanic or Latino of any race.

the estimated median household income was $55,814, and the per capita income around 2020 was approximately $51,119.

== See also ==
- Tennessee census statistical areas
- List of cities and towns in Tennessee
