= Col. Robert Z. Taylor House =

- U.S. National Register of Historic Places
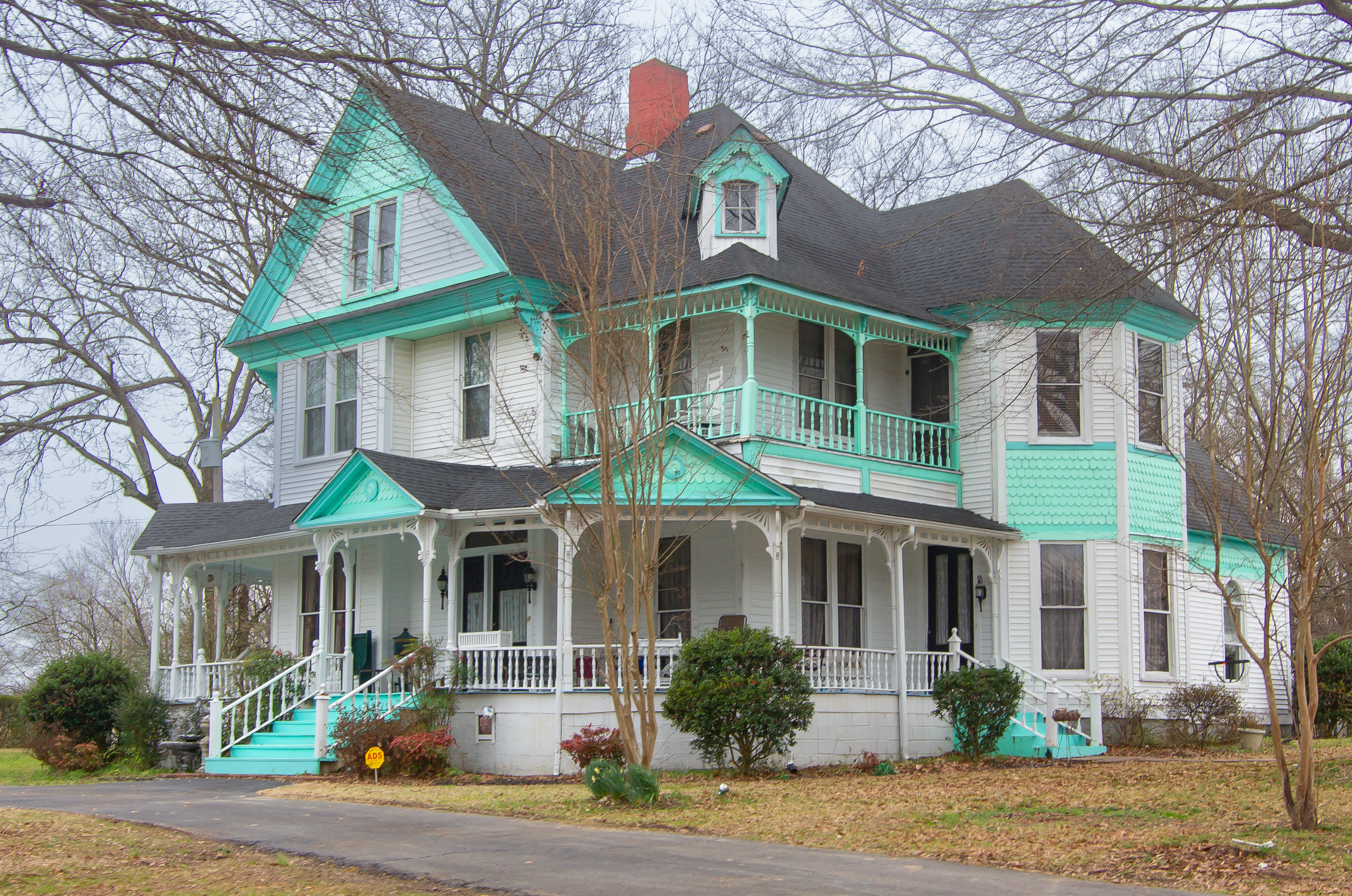

- Location within Tennessee
- Location: 1008 S. College Street, Trenton, Tennessee
- Coordinates: 35°58′05″N 88°56′31″W
- Area: 1.8 acres (0.73 ha)
- Built: 1895
- Architectural style: Queen Anne
- NRHP reference No.: 82003970
- Added to NRHP: April 12, 1982

The Col. Robert Z. Taylor House is a historic house in Trenton, Tennessee. It was built in 1895 for a Confederate veteran and Democratic politician. It is listed on the National Register of Historic Places.

== History ==
The house was built in 1895 for Colonel Robert Z. Taylor, an attorney. By the end of the American Civil War in 1864, Taylor joined the Confederate States Army and served as a colonel. He served as the clerk and master of Gibson County's Chancery Court in the late 1880s, and he helped build the Gibson County Courthouse in Trenton. He was also active in the Democratic Party as the chairman of its Gibson County committee. The house was sold out of the Taylor family shortly after his death in 1922.

== Architectural significance ==
The house was designed in the Queen Anne architectural style. It has been listed on the National Register of Historic Places since April 12, 1982.
