= Neboville, Tennessee =

Neboville, Tennessee, also called Nebo, is an unincorporated community that lies on Nebo-Yorkville Rd in Gibson County, Tennessee

== Geography ==
Located South of Yorkville, West of Hooten and Trenton, East of Tatumville, Tennessee, and North of Spring Hill and Eaton.

== Name ==
Neboville was once called Hooten and Hooten was once called Nebo.

== History ==
Neboville was on the Yorkville Circuit in the 1870s. In 1917, the community was working to establish a special school district for Nebo and to get a high school.
