= Spring Hill, Gibson County, Tennessee =

Community in Tennessee

Coordinates: 35°59′02″N 89°07′20″W

Spring Hill, also called Central, is an old unincorporated community in West Tennessee. Spring Hill can be considered part of Eaton to some. One of the things known about Spring Hill is its old gin that was around. Another is the Spring Hill School (Home Of The Hornets) that exists next to the Spring Hill Baptist Church.

== Geography ==
Located on the 188 between Yorkville and Eaton, West of Whitway and Trenton, northwest of Humboldt, Gibson, Gibson Wells, and Brazil, and East of what once was College Hill; Spring Hill is merged with Central, in fact, some maps show Spring Hill as the name and others show Central as the name.

== History ==
The Spring Hill High School was demolished. Central Fire Department changed its name to Spring Hill Fire Department sometime in the 2000s (before 2019), to reflect the nearby school and churches. The Spring Hill graveyards were contributed by Buckner's wife

== Education ==
The Spring Hill Elementary School is a K-8 school in Gibson County. The school exists/is located at 84 Tennessee State Route 188, Eaton, Tennessee 38331. A boundary map of the Spring Hill School district expands into Brazil. The same boundary map indicates where Central is under the Spring Hill School District.

A 2017 boundary map of the Spring Hill School district, includes Town names.

Spring Hill Elementary School used to include a highschool until the late 1900s. Spring Hill School is home of the Hornets.

== Transportation ==
=== Road ===
The 104 and the 188 intersect in Central.

=== Rail ===
The Newbern–Dyersburg train station is about 11 miles (18 km) away in Newbern.
