= Dodson House =

- U.S. National Register of Historic Places
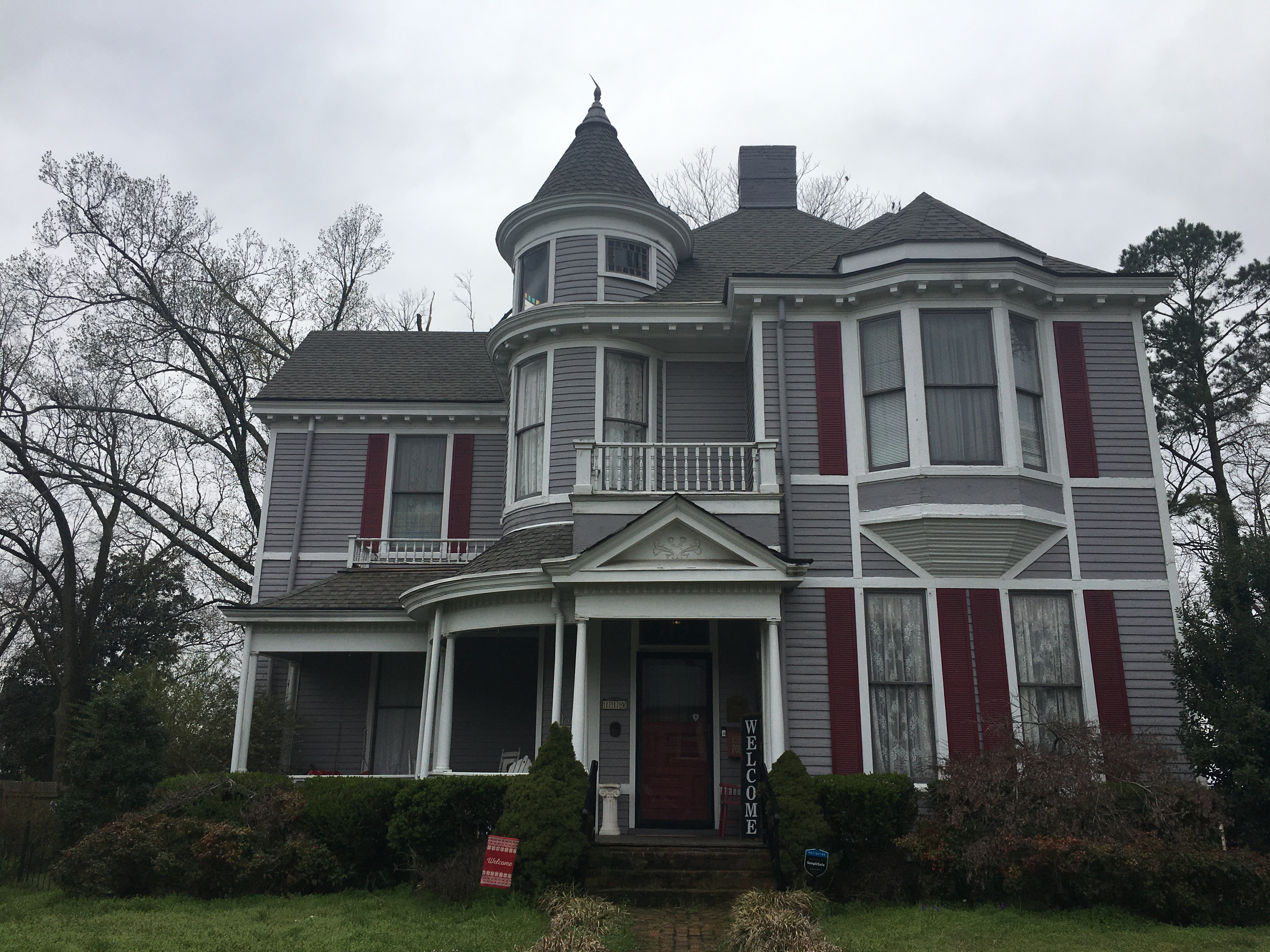

- Location within Tennessee
- Location: 119 North 17th Avenue, Humboldt, Tennessee
- Coordinates: 35°49′14″N 88°54′47″W
- Area: less than one acre
- Built: 1894
- Architectural style: Queen Anne
- NRHP reference No.: 82003969
- Added to NRHP: March 25, 1982

The Dodson House, also known as the Dodson-Himelright House, is a historic house in Humboldt, Tennessee, U.S..

== History ==
The house was built in 1894 for William Dodson, a real estate developer. It was inherited by his son George, an attorney, in 1904, who lived here until his death in 1931. It was then inherited by George's son, William Hooper Dodson, the owner of the Dodson Ford dealership.

The house was later purchased by the Himelright family.

== Architectural significance ==
The house was designed in the Queen Anne architectural style. It has been listed on the National Register of Historic Places since March 25, 1982.
