= Jetton (surname) =

Jetton is an English surname. Notable people with the surname include:

- Lew Jetton (born 1959), American guitarist and singer
- Paul Jetton (1964–2016), American football player
- Rod Jetton (born 1967), American politician, author, and businessman
