= Senter-Rooks House =

- U.S. National Register of Historic Places
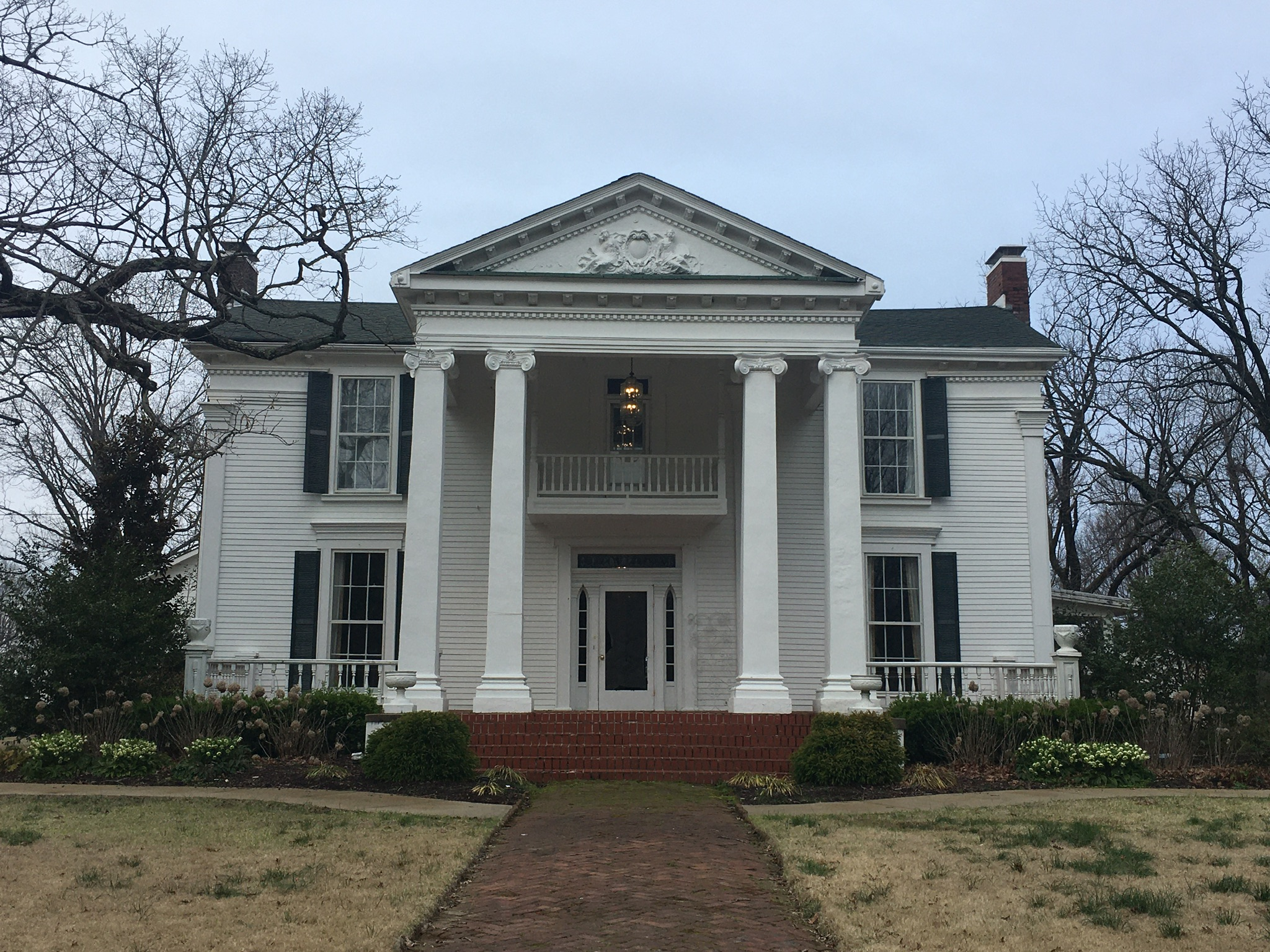

- Location within Tennessee
- Location: 2227 Main St. Humboldt, Tennessee
- Coordinates: 35°49′15″N 88°54′22″W
- Area: 1.2 acres (0.49 ha)
- Built: 1860
- Architectural style: Neo-Classical
- NRHP reference No.: 80003797
- Added to NRHP: July 9, 1980

The Senter-Rooks House, also known as Twin Oaks, is a historic house in Humboldt, Tennessee, U.S.. It was the residence of a former mayor of Humboldt. It is listed on the National Register of Historic Places.

== History ==
The house was built in 1860-1866 for J. N. Lanom. A year after the end of the American Civil War of 1861–1865, in 1866, the house was purchased by Moses E. Senter, who served as Humboldt's mayor from 1866 to 1869. Senter was also the pastor of the First Baptist Church of Humbold until he became a Freemason in 1873.

The house was purchased by Charles Wesley Rooks, a newspaper publisher and state senator, in 1917. He served as the president of the Savings and Loan Association of Humboldt from 1938 to 1946. He lived in the house with his wife, Kate Senter, who was Moses E. Senter's granddaughter. It was owned by their daughter, Bessie Rooks Fitzgerald, from 1946 to 1976, when it was purchased by their grandson, Dr. Charles Couch.

== Architectural significance ==
The house was designed in the Neo-Classical architectural style. It has been listed on the National Register of Historic Places since July 9, 1980.
