= Trenton Historic District (Trenton, Tennessee) =

Historic district in Tennessee, United States

- U.S. National Register of Historic Places
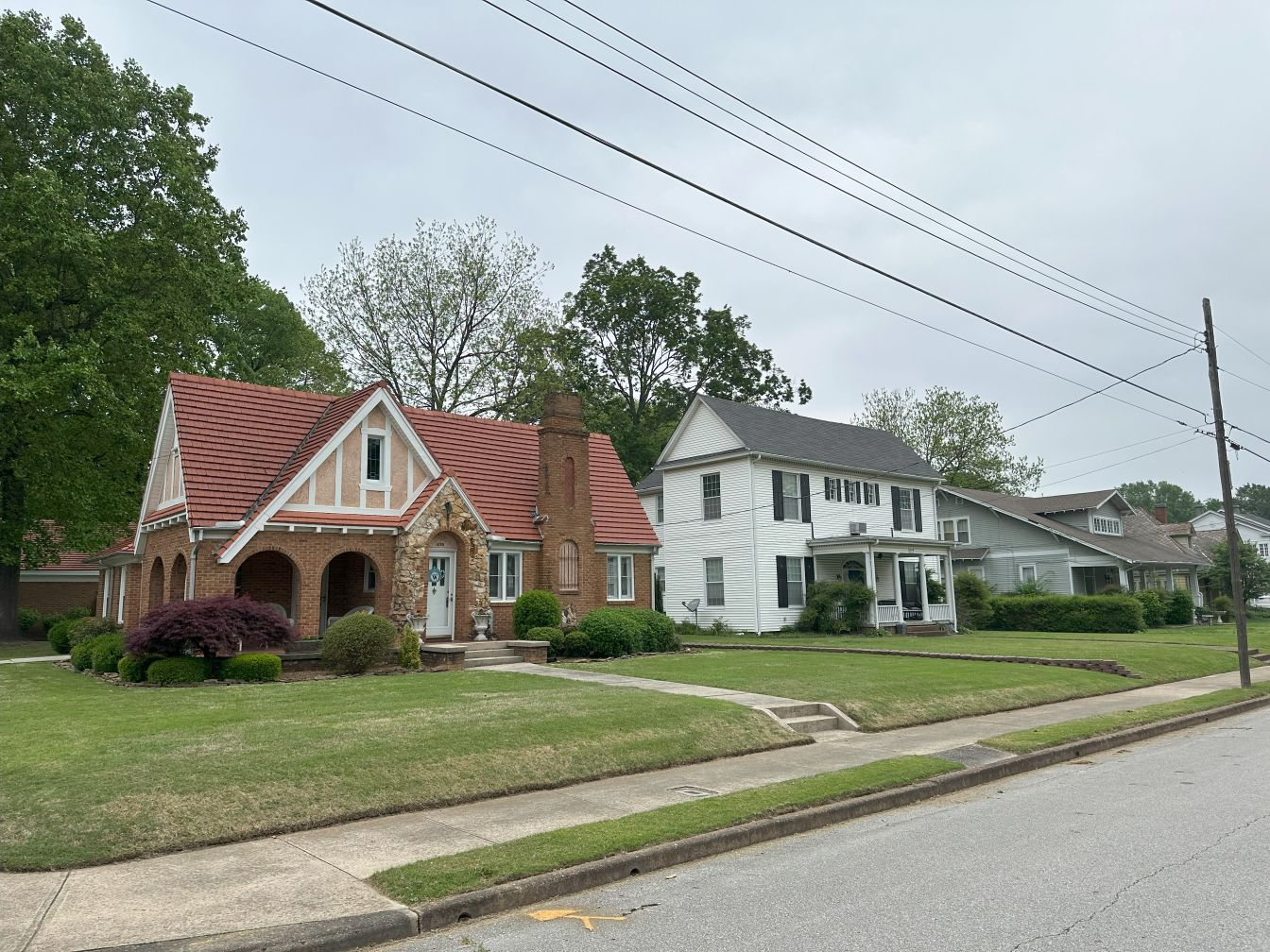
- Houses in the Trenton Historic District

- Location within Tennessee
- Location: High, College, and Church Sts., Trenton, Tennessee
- Coordinates: 35°58′34″N 88°56′30″W
- Area: 52 acres (21 ha)
- Built by: Multiple
- Architectural style: Late 19th and 20th Century Revivals, Greek Revival, Queen Anne
- NRHP reference No.: 82003971
- Added to NRHP: April 15, 1982

The Trenton Historic District in Trenton, Tennessee is a 52 acres (21 ha) historic district which was listed on the National Register of Historic Places in 1982. The listing included 96 contributing buildings.

According to its National Register nomination, "The District is a cultural resource, not only for its attractive tree-lined streets which lead to the public square, but for its enduring ties with the past. Despite alterations and the intrusion of modern structures which do not meet the architectural standards of the preceding generations, the Trenton District retains its well-established residential character and represents the largest collection of historic architecture within Gibson County."
