= Frog Jump, Tennessee =

Frog Jump, Tennessee is the name of two unincorporated communities:

- Frog Jump, Crockett County, Tennessee
- Frog Jump, Gibson County, Tennessee
