= Browning House =

- U.S. National Register of Historic Places
- Location within Tennessee
- Nearest city: Milan, Tennessee
- Coordinates: 35°55′27″N 88°43′10″W
- Area: 0.6 acres (0.24 ha)
- Built: 1873
- NRHP reference No.: 74001912
- Added to NRHP: June 28, 1974

The Browning House is a historic house in Milan, Tennessee. It was built in 1873, and was the childhood home of Gordon Browning, who served as the governor of Tennessee from 1937 to 1939. In 1941, the house was purchased by the Milan Army Ammunition Plant (MLAAP), and was unused until 1953, when it was restored by Procter and Gamble (the MLAAP's operating contractor) and used as additional office space. It has been listed on the National Register of Historic Places since June 28, 1974.
