= South Gibson =

South Gibson may refer to:

- South Gibson, Pennsylvania
- South Gibson County High School
- South Gibson School Corporation
