= Oakland Cemetery (Trenton, Tennessee) =

Historic cemetery in Trenton, Gibson County, Tennessee, US

- U.S. National Register of Historic Places
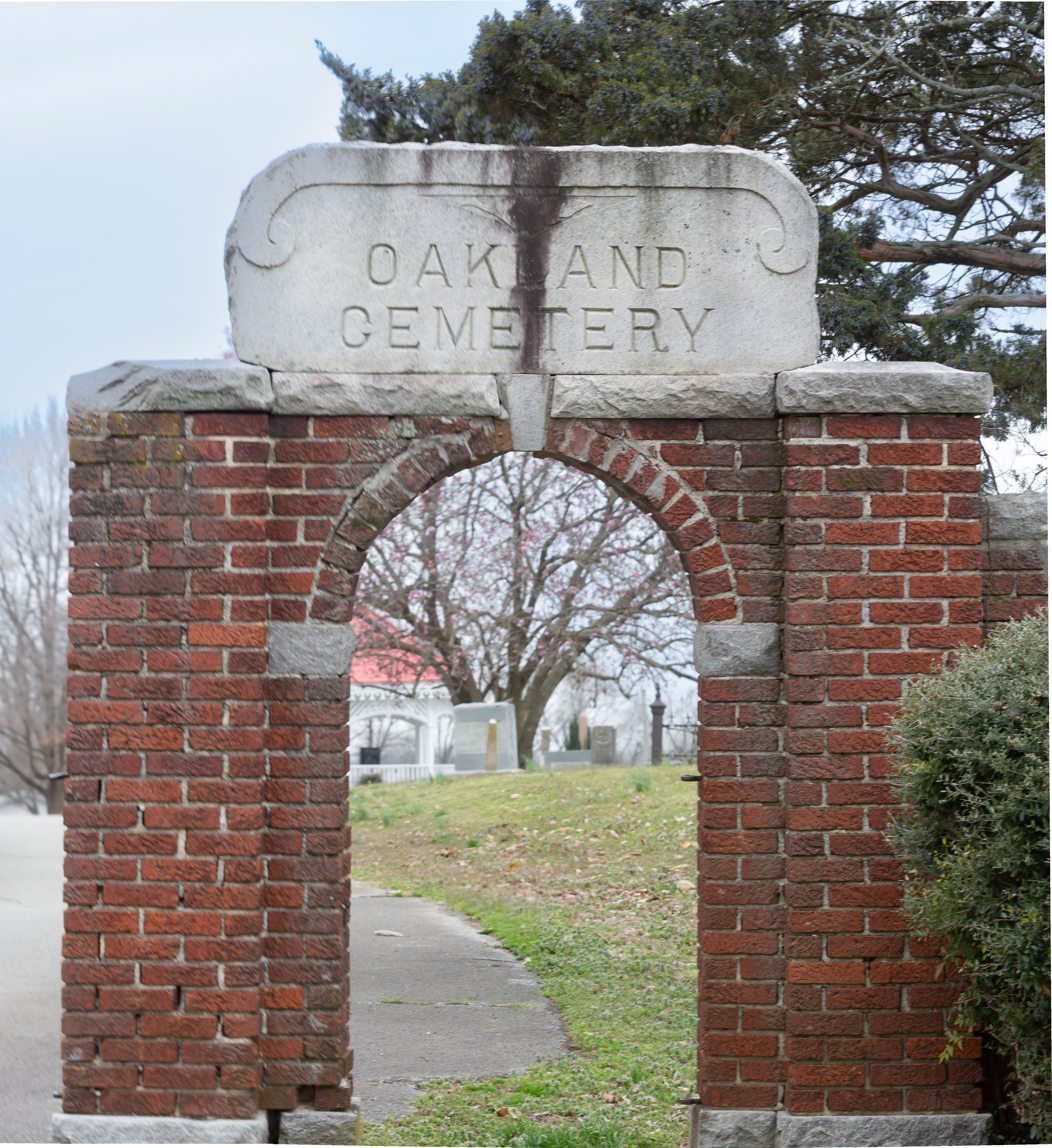

- Location within Tennessee
- Location: 800 Brownsville Street, Trenton, Tennessee
- Coordinates: 35°58′17″N 88°56′40″W
- Area: 31 acres (13 ha)
- Built: 1825
- NRHP reference No.: 07000186
- Added to NRHP: March 20, 2007

Oakland Cemetery is a historic cemetery in Trenton, Tennessee. Established in the Antebellum era, it includes two Confederate monuments, and a third monument to Trenton Cotton Mills employees. It is listed on the National Register of Historic Places. The smaller Ward cemetery lies at the south-western corner of Oakland cemetery.

== History ==
The cemetery was established in 1825.

In the aftermath of the American Civil War of 1861–1865, many local veterans of the Confederate States Army were buried here. By 1900, the United Daughters of the Confederacy commissioned the construction of a Confederate monument in their memory, with a Bonnie Blue Flag in the center.

There is a second Confederate memorial with the names of CSA veterans in the cemetery: an inscription on the gazebo, enhanced by a metal plaque commissioned by the Sons of Confederate Veterans circa 1990.

A third monument was erected by the Dyersburg Corporation for their employees at the historic Trenton Cotton Mills circa 1990.

Notable burials include Confederate colonels Thomas Jones Freeman and Munson Rufus Hill as well as Congressmen Robert Porter Caldwell and James C. McDearmon. Other notables include Congressman Pleasant Moorman Miller.

The cemetery has been listed on the National Register of Historic Places since March 20, 2007.

== Ward African-American cemetery ==
On 16 January 1940, Sam and Eliza Ward purchased 7 acres of land between 8th and 10th Street, Trenton. Part of the parcel became Ward cemetery; it appears on plat drawings dated 21 April 1942. By 1986, most of the remainder of the original Ward purchase had been bought by the City of Trenton and was used to extend Oakland cemetery.
Today, Oakland forms the northern and eastern boundaries of Ward cemetery. By 2019, Ward cemetery held least 162 burials.
