= Munson Rufus Hill =

American politician

- Born: May 4, 1821; Monroe County, New York
- Died: September 24, 1867 (aged 46) Memphis, Tennessee
- Buried: Oakland Cemetery
- Allegiance: Confederate States of America
- Branch: Confederate States Army
- Service years: 1861–1863
- Rank: Colonel
- Commands: 47th Tennessee Infantry Regiment
- Conflicts: American Civil War
- Spouse: Elizabeth Hale

Munson Rufus Hill (May 4, 1821 – October 24, 1867) was an American lawyer, politician and Confederate officer. Hill was born in Monroe County, New York. In 1839 he moved to Dyersburg, Tennessee, and then Trenton, Tennessee, ten years later. He attended Cazenovia Seminary in New York. In his antebellum career, he served as a lawyer and in the Tennessee state legislature, and married Elizabeth Hale. Hill was appointed colonel with the 47th Tennessee Infantry Regiment. He resigned his colonelship on January 5, 1863, due to "remittant [sic] fever" and gastroenteritis. Later that year, he lost a race for the Confederate States Congress. Hill died on October 24, 1867, of yellow fever in Memphis. He is buried at Oakland Cemetery in Trenton, Tennessee. Hill's step-brother Lyman Rufus Casey was a U.S. Senator from South Dakota.
