= Lew Jetton =

American blues guitarist and singer (born 1959)

Lew Jetton (born 1959 in Humboldt, Tennessee, United States) is an American blues guitarist and singer, who also spent many years as a meteorologist and local television personality. He was born in Humboldt and raised near Trenton, Tennessee.

== Career ==
After graduation from college at Middle Tennessee State University in 1981, he worked in radio at WIRJ (AM)/WZDQ-FM in Humboldt, Tennessee from 1982 to 1983, moving to television as a weathercaster/news reporter at WBBJ-TV in Jackson, Tennessee. He also spent a short stint as a sports anchor at WBBJ, before moving to WPSD-TV in Paducah, Kentucky in 1989 as weekend news anchor/meteorologist. Jetton is a second cousin of the late Pulitzer Prize–winning journalist Nat Caldwell of the Nashville Tennessean. Jetton left local television in 2007 to concentrate on music.

== Music ==
In 1994, while still working in local TV, he began playing guitar with the blues band, 61 South, based in Paducah, Kentucky, which featured, among others, Col. J.D. Wilkes, of Th' Legendary Shack Shakers and The Dirt Daubers. Upon the departure of "Fast" Layne Hendrickson, the lead singer of the band, Jetton was recruited to become the frontman of the band, while mentored by his friend Snooky Pryor in nearby Ullin, Illinois.

Working and touring as a regional band in the Midwest and Mid-South, Lew Jetton & 61 South shared billings with blues musicians including Luther Allison, Mike Zito, Koko Taylor, Little Milton, Chuck Berry, and Lil' Ed and The Blues Imperials. Lew Jetton & 61 South has released five albums: State Line Blues (2000), Tales From A 2 Lane (2006), Rain (2016), Palestine Blues (2017) and Deja Hoodoo (2022). State Line Blues was the fourth best Independent Blues Release in the United States by Real Blues Magazine. Tales From A 2 Lane was selected as the Blues Album of the Year by the Kentucky Blues Society, a "Pick to Click" by XM Satellite Radio Bluesville (Channel 74), which kept Jetton originals "Waffle House Woman" and "I Been Cheated" on their hot playlist throughout most of 2006. Tales From A 2 Lane was also selected one of the top Independent Blues Releases by Real Blues Magazine.

In 2007, the band re-released 2000's State Line Blues, which was also picked up as a "Pick to Click" on XM's Bluesville, with "Gettin' Colder," "State Line Blues" and "Homegrown Tomato" receiving the most airplay.

In 2016, Jetton signed with Coffee Street Records, a small label based in Kentucky and began work on his third album. The result of which was Rain, the first new music from Jetton in 10 years. Rain debuted on Roots Music Report's Contemporary Blues Album chart at number 15 in the world only two weeks after its release.

Lew Jetton & 61 South continue playing festivals and clubs and touring extensively in the Midwest, Mid-South and occasionally venturing to other regions.

== Discography ==
- State Line Blues (2000) Independent (Brooks Chapel Music)
- Tales From A 2 Lane (2006) Independent (Brooks Chapel Music)
- Rain (2016) Coffee Street Records (Brooks Chapel Music)
- Palestine Blues (2017) Coffee Street Records (Brooks Chapel Music)
