= William Woods (pitcher) =

American baseball player (born 1998)

- Pitcher
- Born: December 29, 1998 (age 27); Trenton, Tennessee, U.S.
- Batted: Right Threw: Right

MLB debut
- April 27, 2022, for the Atlanta Braves

Last MLB appearance
- May 1, 2022, for the Atlanta Braves

MLB statistics
- Win–loss record: 0–0
- Earned run average: 0.00
- Strikeouts: 2
- Stats at Baseball Reference

Teams
- Atlanta Braves (2022)

William Woods (born December 29, 1998) is an American former professional baseball pitcher. He played in Major League Baseball (MLB) with the Atlanta Braves for two games during the 2022 season.

== Amateur career ==
Woods attended Peabody High School in Trenton, Tennessee, where he pitched to a 12–2 record with a 0.84 ERA and 119 strikeouts as a senior in 2017. After graduating, he first enrolled at the University of Tennessee at Martin before transferring to Dyersburg State Community College at the end of the fall semester. At Dyersburg State, he went 7–3 with a 3.64 ERA over 12 starts for the 2018 season. Following the season's end, he was selected by the Atlanta Braves in the 23rd round of the 2018 Major League Baseball draft.

== Professional career ==
=== Atlanta Braves ===
Woods signed with Atlanta and made his professional debut with the Rookie-level Gulf Coast League Braves, going 0–1 with a 6.10 ERA over 20 2/3 innings. In 2019, Woods pitched for the Rome Braves of the Class A South Atlantic League in which he went 1–5 with a 3.35 ERA and 58 strikeouts over 51 innings. Woods did not play in a game in 2020 due to the cancellation of the minor league season because of the COVID-19 pandemic. He split the 2021 season between Rome and the Mississippi Braves, though he appeared in only five total games due to an elbow injury.

On November 18, 2021, the Braves added Woods to their 40-man roster to protect him from the Rule 5 draft. He opened the 2022 season with Mississippi. After three appearances, Woods was promoted to the Gwinnett Stripers. On April 26, 2022, Woods was called up to the major leagues. He made his MLB debut the next day, pitching a scoreless inning with one walk and one strikeout against the Chicago Cubs. On November 15, Woods was designated for assignment.

=== New York Mets ===
On November 18, 2022, the New York Mets claimed Woods off of waivers. Woods was designated for assignment by the Mets on December 27, after the signing of Adam Ottavino was made official. On January 7, 2023, Woods was sent outright to the Triple-A Syracuse Mets. He posted a stellar 1.80 ERA in 11 games for the Double–A Binghamton Rumble Ponies, but struggled to a 7.88 ERA across 27 appearances for the Triple–A Syracuse. Woods was released by the Mets organization on February 17, 2024.

On April 2, 2024, Woods announced his retirement from professional baseball via Instagram.
