= WIRJ =

Humboldt, Tennessee; United States
- Frequency: 740 kHz

Programming
- Format: News/talk

Ownership
- Owner: John F. Warmath

History
- First air date: January 20, 1949
- Last air date: October 2024

Technical information
- Licensing authority: FCC
- Facility ID: 15796
- Class: D
- Power: 250 watts day; 16 watts night
- Transmitter coordinates: 35°48′52.3″N 88°54′51.2″W

Links
- Public license information: Public file; LMS

WIRJ (740 AM) was a radio station broadcasting a news/talk format. Licensed to Humboldt, Tennessee, United States, the station was owned by John F. Warmath. It operated from 1949 to 2024.

== History ==
Humboldt-Milan-Trenton Broadcasting Co. was issued a construction permit for a new 250-watt daytime-only station on 740 kHz in Humboldt in June 1948. Its principals were J. Frank Warmath, Thomas N. Hobbs, and Robert S. Kelly. After changing the corporate name to Gibson County Broadcasting Company and taking on the WIRJ call sign, the station signed on January 20, 1949.

The Federal Communications Commission cancelled the station’s license on October 31, 2024.
