= Julius Freed House =

- U.S. National Register of Historic Places
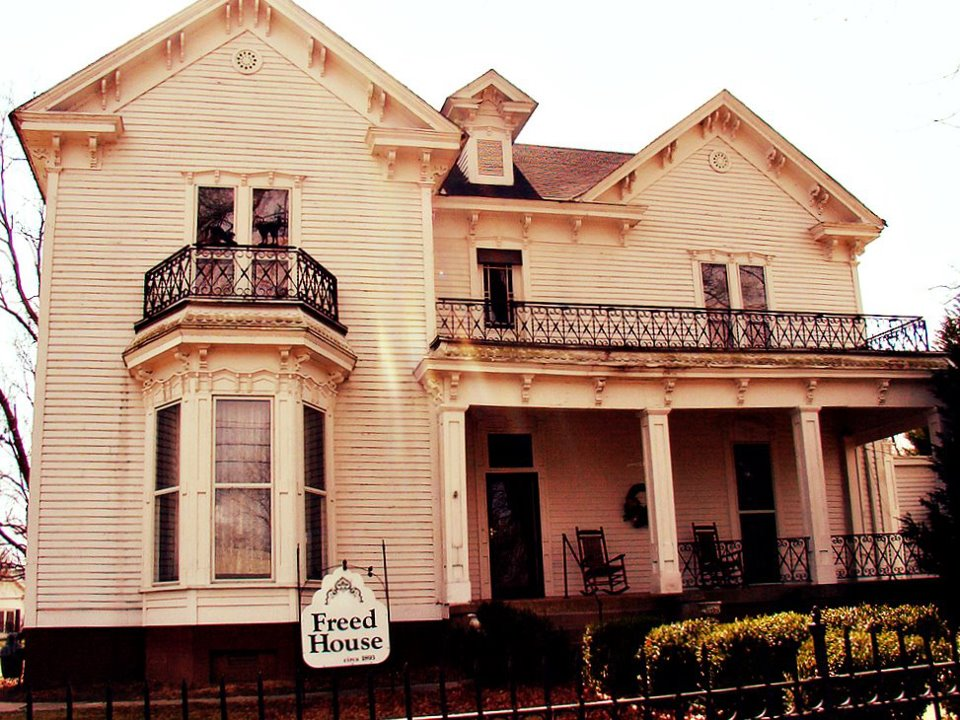

- Location within Tennessee
- Location: Eaton St. W of Gibson Co. Courthouse, Trenton, Tennessee
- Coordinates: 35°58′49″N 88°56′18″W
- Area: 1.8 acres (0.73 ha)
- Built: 1871
- Architectural style: Italianate
- NRHP reference No.: 94000301
- Added to NRHP: April 5, 1994

The Julius Freed House is a historic house in Trenton, Tennessee. It was built in 1871-1872 for Prussian-born Confederate veteran and Klansman Julius Freed. It is listed on the National Register of Historic Places.

== History ==
The house was built in 1871-1872 for Julius Freed, a Jewish Prussian-born dry goods merchant. During the American Civil War of 1861–1865, Freed served in the Confederate States Army's Army of Tennessee. In the post-bellum era, Freed joined the Ku Klux Klan and the Knights of Pythias, and he continued to celebrate Jewish holidays, albeit privately. He also served on Trenton's board of aldermen.

Freed lived in the house with his wife, née Henrietta Cohn, until his death in 1908. The couple had two sons, Joe, who served on the board of aldermen, and Sylvane, who became the president of the Bank of Trenton.

The house was refurbished thanks to a grant from the Tennessee Historical Commission in 2001.

== Architectural significance ==
The house was designed in the Italianate architectural style. It has been listed on the National Register of Historic Places since April 5, 1994.
