= Humboldt Municipal Airport (Tennessee) =

- IATA: none; ICAO: none; FAA LID: M53

Summary
- Airport type: Public
- Owner: City of Humboldt
- Serves: Humboldt, Tennessee
- Elevation AMSL: 421 ft (128 m)
- Coordinates: 35°48′08″N 088°52′30″W

Map
- Location of airport in Tennessee M53 (the United States)

Runways
Direction	Length		Surface
Direction	ft	m	Surface
4/22	4,003	1,220	Asphalt

Statistics (1999)
- Aircraft operations: 10,222
- Based aircraft: 19
- Source: Federal Aviation Administration

Humboldt Municipal Airport (FAA LID: M53) is a public-use airport located in Gibson County, Tennessee, United States. It is three nautical miles (6 km) southeast of the central business district of the City of Humboldt, which owns the airport. According to the FAA's National Plan of Integrated Airport Systems for 2009–2013, it was classified as a general aviation airport.

== Facilities and aircraft ==
Humboldt Municipal Airport covers an area of 128 acres (52 ha) at an elevation of 421 feet (128 m) above mean sea level. It has one runway designated 4/22 with an asphalt surface measuring 4,003 by 75 feet (1,220 x 23 m).

For the 12-month period ending November 23, 1999, the airport had 10,222 aircraft operations, an average of 28 per day: 98.5% general aviation, 1% air taxi, and 0.5% military. At that time there were 19 aircraft based at this airport: 89.5% single-engine and 10.5% multi-engine.

== See also ==
- List of airports in Tennessee
