= United States Post Office (Trenton, Tennessee) =

- U.S. Post Office
- U.S. National Register of Historic Places
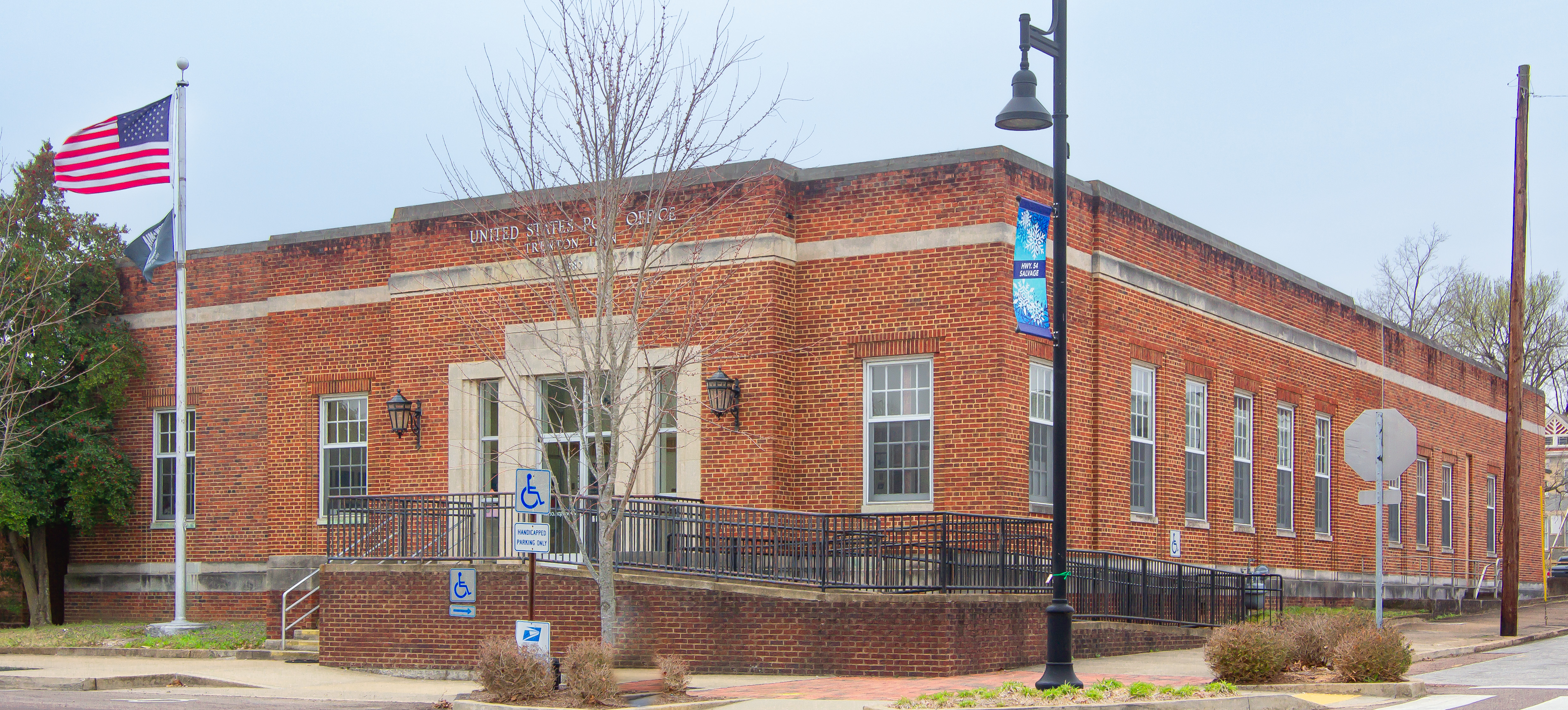

- Location within Tennessee
- Location: 200 S. College St. Trenton, Tennessee
- Coordinates: 35°58′55″N 88°56′30″W
- Area: 0.7 acres (0.28 ha)
- Built: 1935
- Architect: Louis A. Simon
- Engineer: George O. Von Nerta
- Architectural style: Greek Revival
- NRHP reference No.: 88001576
- Added to NRHP: September 23, 1988

The United States Post Office in Trenton, Tennessee was built in 1935. It was listed on the National Register of Historic Places in 1988.
