= Bailey Walsh =

American politician

G. Bailey Walsh (1905–1962) was a politician from the U.S. state of Tennessee. He served in the Navy, participated in the Nuremberg trials, served as a US District attorney, and was the head of the Republican Party of Tennessee, as well as the party's National Campaign Director.

== Early life ==
Walsh was born in Trenton, Tennessee, later moving to Humboldt, Tennessee, where he attended Humboldt High School. He lived much of his life in Washington, D.C., and Memphis, Tennessee. In 1945 he married Dorothy McDaniel. He died April 8, 1962.

== Career ==
=== World War II ===
During World War II, he served as a lieutenant commander in the US Navy on the aircraft carrier Essex. He served as an attorney during the Nuremberg trials. After returning from active duty, he was named attorney for the alien property section of the Department of Justice.

=== Legal and political ===
Although his father had been a US district attorney for the Democratic Wilson administration, Walsh was appointed an assistant US district attorney by Republican Herbert Hoover. He served from 1929 to 1932. Walsh was a Republican from Memphis, ran unsuccessfully for the Republican nomination for governor of Tennessee in 1938, and served as secretary of the Tennessee Republican Party in 1939. In 1940, he introduced the Republican nominee, Wendell Willkie at the Republican National Convention. In 1948, Walsh was the National Republican Campaign director. He was also an assistant attorney general for the state of Louisiana, for whom he worked on the Tidelands case, ultimately successfully arguing the case before the U.S. Supreme Court. Walsh is interred at Rose Hill Cemetery in Humboldt, Tennessee.
