= Idlewild, Tennessee =

Unincorporated community in Tennessee

Coordinates: 36.028°N 88.810°W

Idlewild is an unincorporated community in Gibson County, Tennessee.

The community began to form in the 1870s. Initially it used the names Thedford and Sprawling, for early settlers with the surnames Thetford and Sprawling. The origin of the Idlewild name is not known. In 1887 Goodspeed's History of Tennessee described Idlewild as a "station on the Illinois Central Railroad south of Bradford," further saying "it was established in 1873, but it has never attained much importance."

Idlewild is the site of a post office, assigned zip code 38346. In 2011 the U.S. Postal Service listed it as one of almost 32,000 post offices being studied as candidates for being replaced by an arrangement to provide retail postal services through another local retail business.
