= Milan Army Ammunition Plant =

Facility of the US Army Joint Munitions Command

Coordinates: 35°52′51″N 88°42′20″W

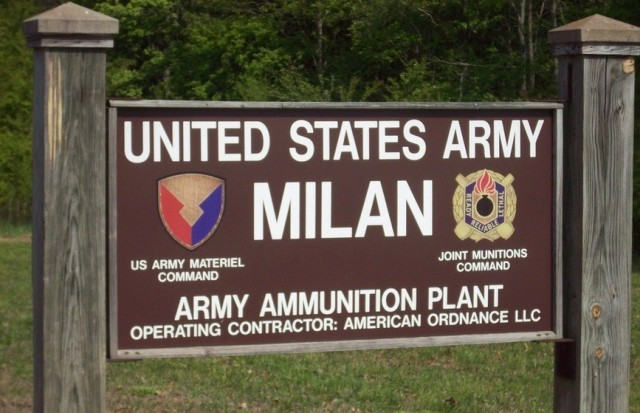
The Milan Army Ammunition Plant sign marks one of the entry points to the installation.

Milan Army Ammunition Plant (MLAAP) was an ammunition plant of the United States Army Joint Munitions Command in Gibson County, Tennessee, near Milan, Tennessee and about 23 miles (37 km) north of Jackson, Tennessee.

== History ==
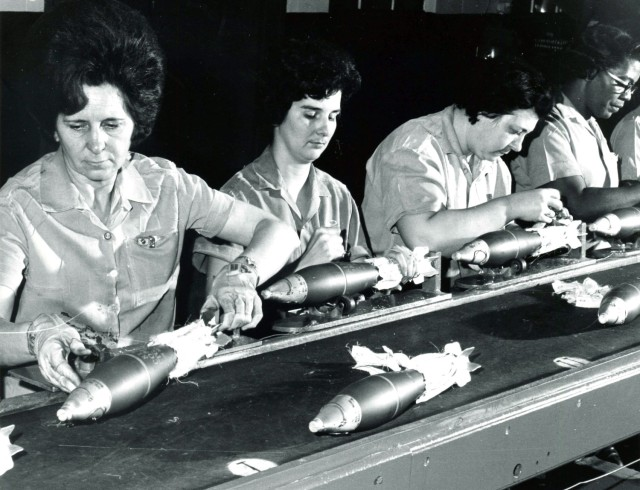
Employees at the Milan Army Ammunition Plant inspect 81mm mortar rounds produced at the plant in this photo from the 1960s.

Milan Ordnance Depot and Wolf Creek Ordnance Plant were established in 1941. In 1943, they merged, becoming Milan Ordnance Center (MOC) and later Milan Arsenal (MA) in 1945. In the 1960s, it became MLAAP.

=== Capabilities ===
Capabilities of the center included: load, assemble and pack ammunition; 40 mm cartridges; mortars and components; artillery projectiles; ignition cartridges; propelling charges; bursters; grenades; Tactical Missile System; demilitarization/disposal; renovation/reclamation; development and production test support; and logistical support.

=== Facilities ===
MLAAP was housed on 22,531 acres (35.205 mi^{2}) (90.48 km^{2}) with 1,450 buildings and 873 igloos and a storage capacity of 2,270,000 square feet (211,000 m^{2}).

=== BRAC 2005 ===
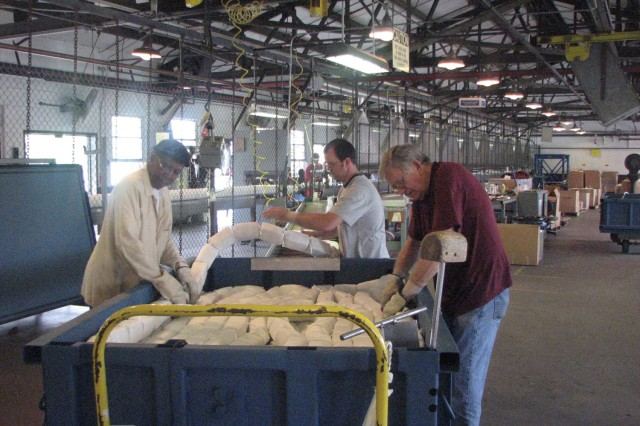
Employees at the Milan Army Ammunition Plant inspect 2,000 pounds of extruded C4 on a rope known as Mine-Clearing Line Charge (MICLIC) in this May 2008 photo.

MLAAP gained the 155 mm artillery and 60 mm, 81 mm, and 120 mm mortar workload from Kansas Army Ammunition Plant. It also gained the 105 mm and 155 mm artillery, Multiple Launch Rocket System and hand grenade, and 60 mm and 81 mm mortar workload from Lone Star Army Ammunition Plant. Both facilities were closed under Base Realignment and Closure 2005.

=== American Ordnance Involvement ===
American Ordnance LLC, operating contractor of Milan Army Ammunition Plant, moved Milan's operations pertaining to ordnance manufacture to Iowa Army Ammunition Plant beginning in 2009. Milan Army Ammunition plant, while still an active facility, no longer produced military ordnance.

== Closure ==
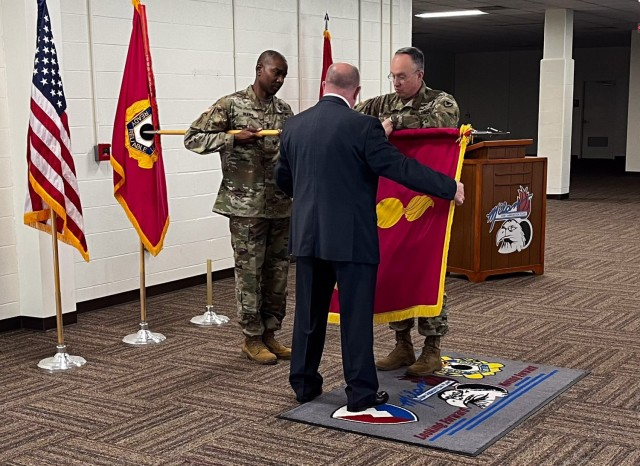
Brig. Gen. Ronnie Anderson Jr. (right), Tom Nowell, and Command Sgt. Maj. Christopher Reaves secure the Milan Army Ammunition Plant’s flag at a ceremony deactivating the installation.

In August 2019 Joint Munitions Command completed the movement of ammunition and explosive stocks stored at MLAAP and declared the plant no longer required for mission needs. The Army proposes to close and dispose of the approximately 22, 531 acres.

Milan Army Ammunition Plant was formally deactivated, April 10, 2025 as part of a “casing of the colors” ceremony. The ceremony was hosted by Brig. Gen. Ronnie Anderson Jr., Joint Munitions Command commander of the plant’s parent command – JMC, headquartered at Rock Island Arsenal, Illinois.

The date that the plant will be vacated is not known.

== Environment ==
MLAAP was placed on the Environmental Protection Agency's National Priority List (Superfund) in 1987.
