= Gibson County Courthouse (Tennessee) =

- U.S. National Register of Historic Places
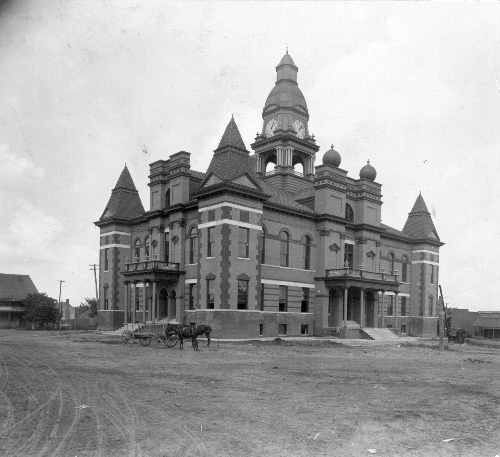
- Gibson County Courthouse, circa 1901

- Location within Tennessee
- Location: Court Sq., Trenton, Tennessee
- Coordinates: 35°58′51″N 88°56′29″W
- Area: 1.5 acres (0.61 ha)
- Built: 1899
- Built by: Walter Chamberlain & Co.
- Architect: Walter Chamberlain & Co.
- Architectural style: Classical Revival
- NRHP reference No.: 76001777
- Added to NRHP: November 7, 1976

The Gibson County Courthouse in Trenton, Tennessee was built in 1899. It was listed on the National Register of Historic Places in 1976.

It is a two-and-one-half-story building with a polychromatic effect created by use of red and yellow brick and gray stone.

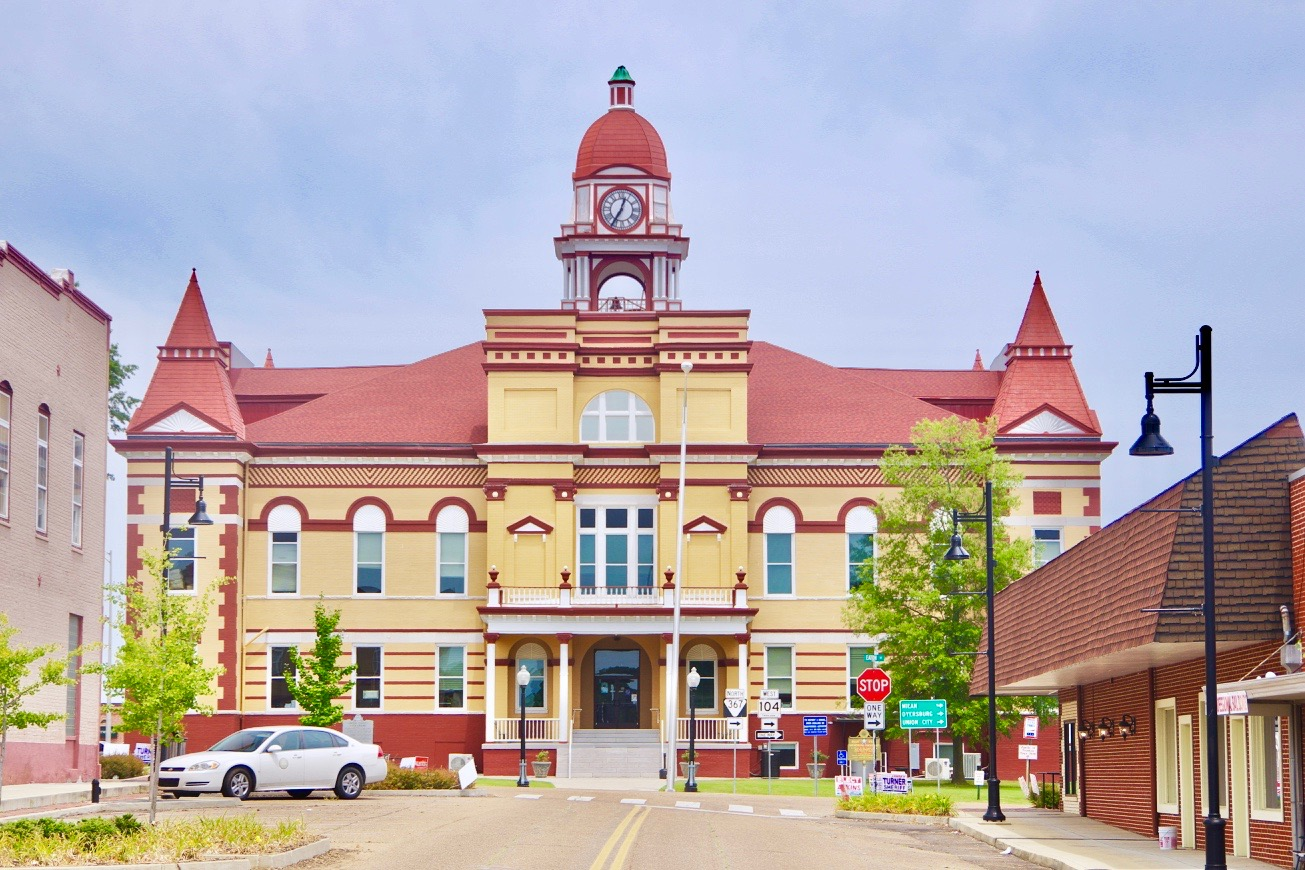
The Gibson County Courthouse as it looks today.
