= Medina City Hall =

- U.S. National Register of Historic Places
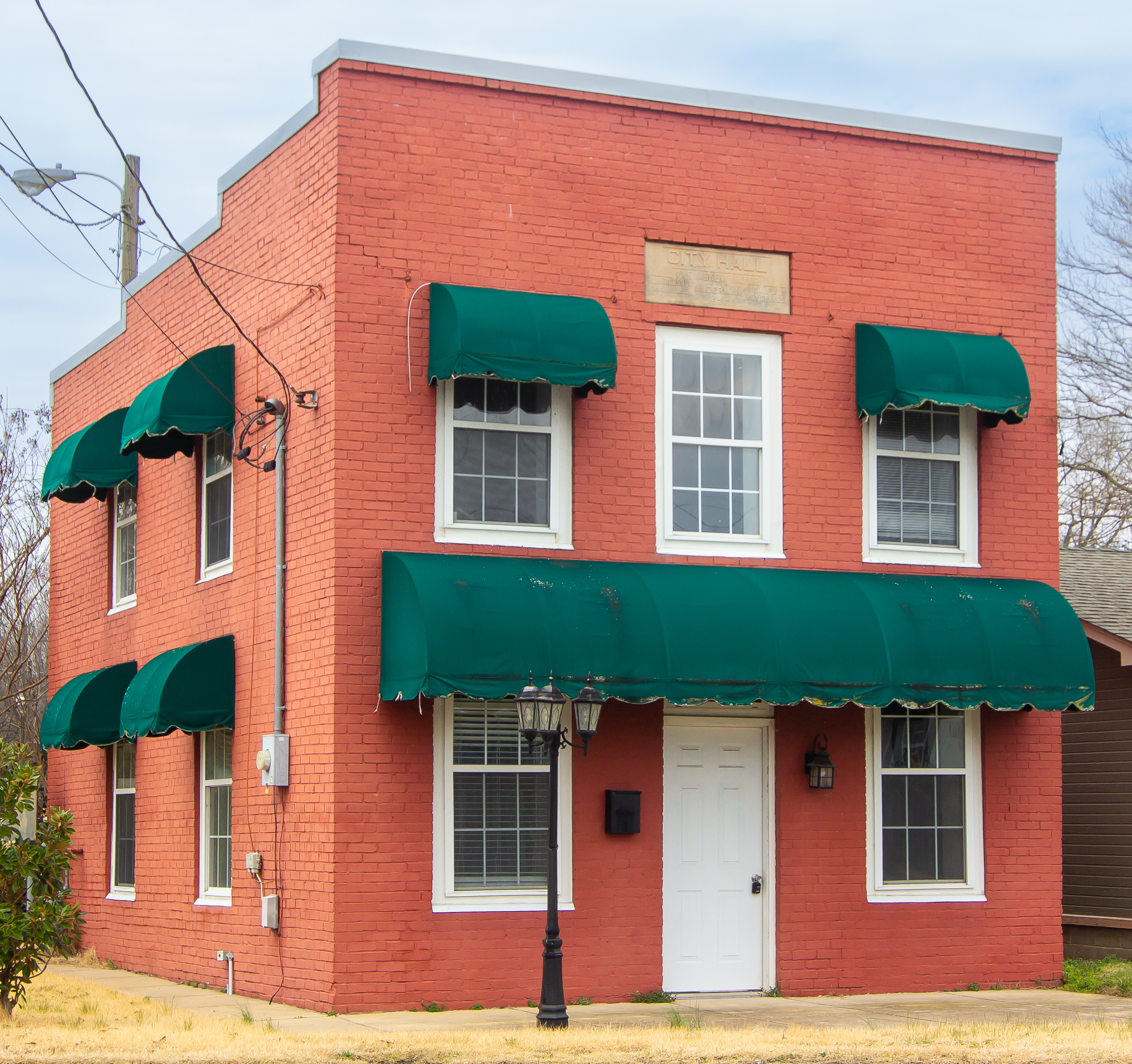

- Location within Tennessee Location within the United States
- Location: 115 2nd St., Medina, Tennessee
- Coordinates: 35°48′10.3″N 88°46′34″W
- Area: less than one acre
- Built: 1936
- Architectural style: Two-part Commercial
- NRHP reference No.: 04000674
- Added to NRHP: July 7, 2004

The Medina City Hall is a commercial/municipal building in Medina, Tennessee.

== Building Description ==
It is "a two-part commercial, two-story rectangular brick building with a brick foundation." The first floor contains a jail cell.

== History ==
The building was constructed in 1936 and was used until 1960, when a new city hall building was constructed. It was listed on the National Register of Historic Places in 2004.
