= Peabody High School (Tennessee) =

Location
- 2069 Highway 45 Bypass South; Trenton, (Gibson County), Tennessee 38382; United States; 35.96142°N 88.92778°W

Information
- Type: Public high school
- Principal: Sonya Campbell
- Staff: 26.33 (FTE)
- Enrollment: 418 (2023-2024)
- Student to teacher ratio: 15.88
- Colors: Black and gold
- Nickname: Golden Tide

- Peabody High School
- U.S. National Register of Historic Places
- Location within Tennessee Location within the United States
- Location: S. College St., Trenton, Tennessee
- Coordinates: 35°58′10″N 88°56′31″W
- Area: 6.6 acres (2.7 ha)
- Built: 1917 1980
- Architect: Heavner, Rueben A.
- Architectural style: Classical Revival
- NRHP reference No.: 84000326
- Added to NRHP: November 23, 1984

Peabody High School is a public high school in Trenton, Tennessee, operated by the Trenton Special School District for grades 9–12. The school mascot is The Golden Tide and school colors are black and gold. The Trenton campus of Jackson State Community College is adjacent to the Peabody campus. This allows Peabody students an opportunity to obtain college credit by taking courses at Jackson State while attending high school.

== History ==
Peabody High School was established in 1877 with funds provided by philanthropist George Peabody. The first school building was constructed on the former site of Andrew College, which had been purchased by the school directors two years earlier.

Wallace Wade, an American football player and coach of football, basketball, and baseball, and college athletics administrator played football at Peabody High School before transferring and graduating from Morgan Park Academy in Chicago, Illinois in 1913. Duke University's football stadium is named Wallace Wade Stadium in his memory.

A new school building was built in 1917 and remained in use until 1980, when it was replaced by a modern building on a new site. The old Peabody High School building on South College Street was converted for residential use. It was listed on the National Register of Historic Places in 1984.

== Notable alumni ==
- William Woods, baseball player for the Atlanta Braves
