= Union Central Elementary School =

School in Caldwell Parish, Louisiana

Location
- 649 LA 849; Columbia, Louisiana, U.S. Caldwell Parish
- Coordinates: 32.076363°N 92.079616°W

Information
- School district: Caldwell Parish School Board
- NCES District ID: 2200360
- NCES School ID: 220036000283
- Grades: 4–5
- Enrollment: 224 (2022–2023)
- Student to teacher ratio: 12.31
- Mascot: Eagles
- Website: uces.caldwelledu.org

Union Central Elementary School (UCES) is a 4th and 5th grade elementary school in rural Columbia, Louisiana and is part of the Caldwell Parish School Board. Founded during the Jim Crow-era as a K–12th grade school for African American students, the school was known as Union Central School, and Union Central Colored School, until desegregation in 1971.

== History ==
Caeser W. Brown donated land for the school. In 1918, the school had 127 students and 2 teachers. It was established in a consolidation of community schools, hence its name "union".

=== Union Central High School ===
It opened in 1937 as a high school, the Union Central High School, and the Panthers were the mascot. Former principals of Union Central High School included Oscar Johnson, O.C. Rollins, C.B. Haynes, C.H. Chapman, and W.P. Moore (1945–1971).

=== Union Central Elementary School ===
After desegregation it was used as an elementary school, named Union Central Elementary School, and it served mostly an African American student body. The community moved away from school choice, and shifted to a center school model by having the three elementary school campuses serving particular grades.

In 2024, Education Week described the school as being located in an area with housing projects and bumpy roads. In November 2025, a teacher from the school faced charges for allegedly hitting two children.
