= Graball, Gibson County, Tennessee =

- Unincorporated community
- Location within Tennessee Location within the United States
- Coordinates: 35°52′21″N 88°44′41″W
- Country: United States
- State: Tennessee
- County: Gibson
- Elevation: 469 ft (143 m)
- Time zone: UTC-6 (Central (CST))
  - Summer (DST): UTC-5 (CDT)
- Area code: 731
- GNIS feature ID: 1285769

Graball (also known as Grabal) is an unincorporated community in Gibson County, Tennessee. Graball is located along U.S. Route 45E and Tennessee State Route 43 at the southern border of Milan.
