= South Gibson County High School =

Coordinates: 35.8199°N 88.8038°W

Location
- 1000 Hornet Drive; Medina, (Gibson County), Tennessee 38355; United States

Information
- Type: Public high school
- Established: 2009
- School district: Gibson
- Principal: Amber Harris
- Staff: 43.00 (FTE)
- Enrollment: 790 (2022-23)
- Student to teacher ratio: 18.37
- Colors: Orange; Columbia blue Black
- Nickname: Hornets
- Website: https://www.gcssd.org/o/sgchs

South Gibson County High School is a school in Medina, Tennessee, serving students around Medina and Gibson, Tennessee. It opened in 2009, to accommodate a growing population of students who lived in southern Gibson County, but were zoned to attend Gibson County High School.

In 2021 another athletic facility was under development.

In 2023, South Gibson County High School was ranked #17 in Tennessee by U.S. News & World Report.
