= Frog Jump, Gibson County, Tennessee =

Frog Jump, Tennessee
- Unincorporated community
- Location within Tennessee Location within the United States
- Coordinates: 35°54′56″N 89°00′30″W
- Country: United States
- State: Tennessee
- County: Gibson
- Elevation: 312 ft (95 m)
- Time zone: UTC-6 (Central (CST))
  - Summer (DST): UTC-5 (CDT)
- Postal code: 38040
- Area code: 731
- GNIS feature ID: 1284964

Frog Jump is an unincorporated community in Gibson County, Tennessee.

== History ==
Originally called Davis Springs, in the early 1900s the area acquired the name Frog Jump and Lightning Bug Center, so named by Everett Hall from the abundant presence of frogs and lightning bugs in the lowlands. Over time the name was shortened to Frog Jump.

In September 1889, while still called Davis Springs, a black man named Tom Sims was abducted and lynched near the place while being transported to nearby Trenton after being charged in an attempted assault of a young woman.
