= Skullbone, Tennessee =

- Unincorporated community
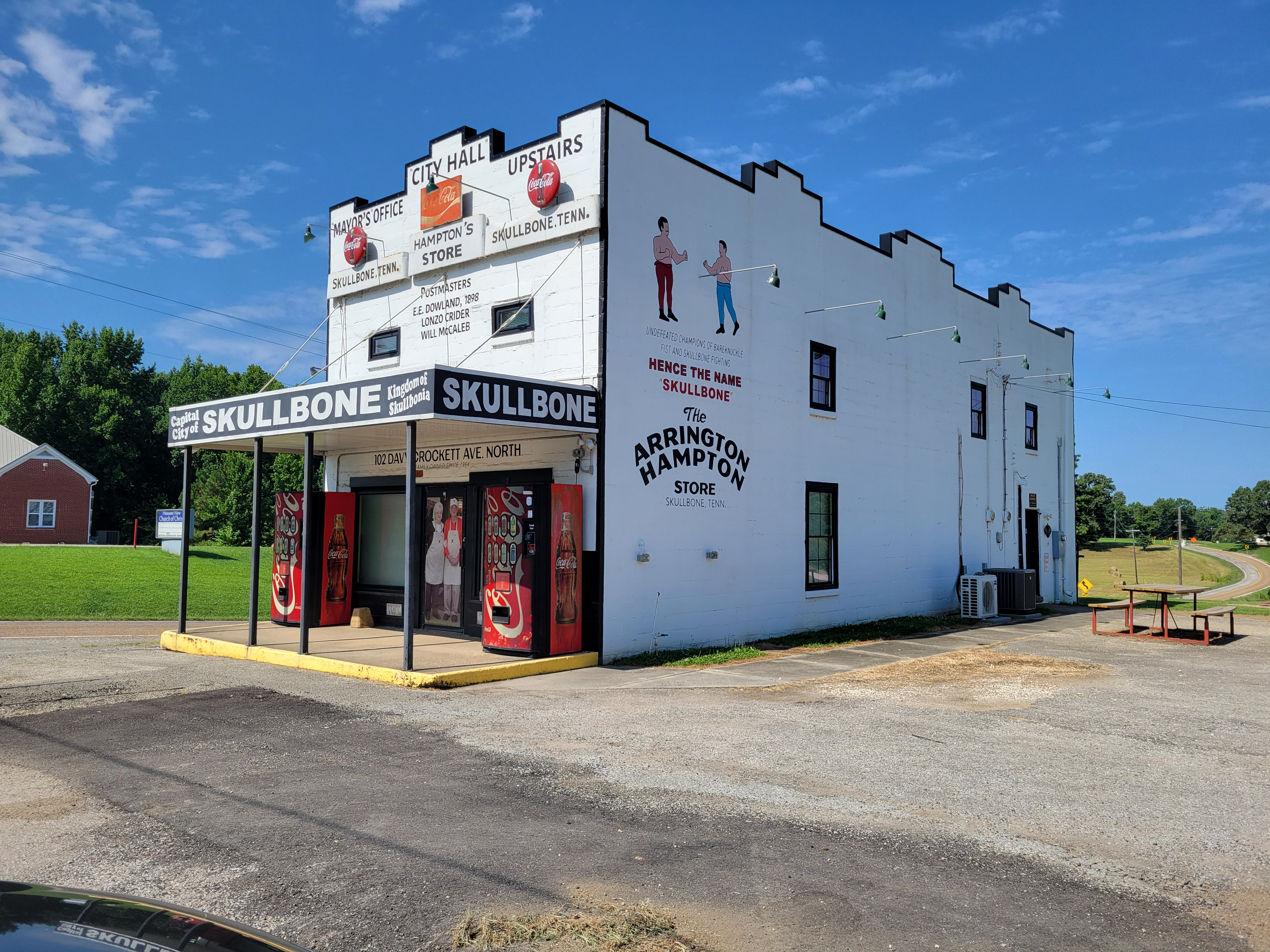
- City hall of Skullbone, Tennessee

- Location within Tennessee Location within the United States
- Coordinates: 36°5′2″N 88°45′40″W
- Country: United States
- State: Tennessee
- County: Gibson
- Elevation: 390 ft (120 m)
- Time zone: UTC-6 (Central (CST))
  - Summer (DST): UTC-5 (CDT)
- GNIS feature ID: 1303656

Skullbone, also called the Kingdom of Skullbonia, is an unincorporated community in Gibson County, Tennessee. It is located to the east of Bradford and is centered on Tennessee State Route 105. The community consists solely of a signpost and a general store, which also serves as the city hall.

== History ==
The community of Skullbone consists solely of a signpost and a general store called Hampton's, which also serves as the city hall. It was named after bare-knuckle boxing, also known as skullboning, which was popular in the area around the general store in the 1800s. When bare-knuckle boxing was made illegal, citizens of the town of Gilbert, Tennessee, decided to establish the town of Skullbone and claim independence from the United States. The general store has a mural depicting bare-knuckle boxers, a list of names of various postmasters that have served the community, and labels reading "Skullbone: Kingdom of Skullbonia", "Hampton’s Store", "City Hall", and "Mayors Office Upstairs". Across the road from the store is a signpost listing the distances to locations such as Rio de Janeiro (5,300 miles), Anchorage, Alaska (3,320 miles), and others. Nearby is a telephone pole that visitors nail cowboy boots too, as is tradition in Skullbone.

There are rumors that Skullbone was historically the site of several lynchings. According to Tennessee's Last Kingdom, a 1998 history book about Skullbone by Ernest R. Pounds, there had long been an unspoken rule that Black people could not reside in the area.

Skullbone previously had a park known as the Skullbone Music Park. The park held music concerts organized by concert promoter Allen Blankenship. Bands and artists that performed in the park included Lynyrd Skynyrd, George Jones, Eddie Money, Charlie Daniels, and Nazareth. Nazareth bassist Pete Agnew noted that the Skullbone Music Park was the first place in the US that they had performed with no Black people in the audience. It was common for vendors to sell Ku Klux Klan merchandise at concerts held in the park. The park was eventually shut down due to its "unruly reputation".

The general sold groceries as well as Skullbone-branded merchandise. However, it shut down in 2020 when the owner of the store (and the mayor of Skullbone) died. The Skullbone store is registered on the National Register of Historic Places.
