= Brazil, Tennessee =

Unincorporated community in Tennessee, US

Coordinates: 35°55′03″N 89°03′45″W

Brazil is an unincorporated community in Gibson County, in the U.S. state of Tennessee. An old variant name was Poplar Grove.

== History ==
The post office called Brazil was discontinued in 1902.
