= Gibson, Tennessee =

- Town
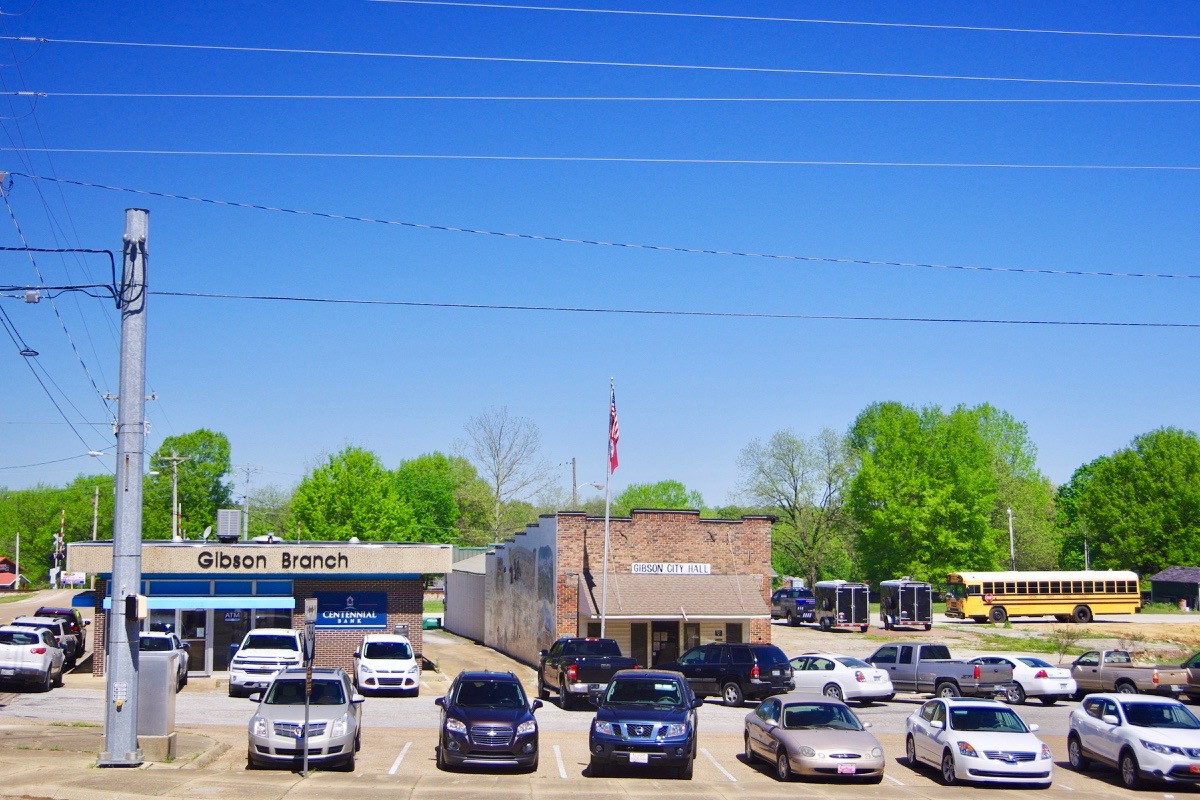
- Gibson, with City Hall at center

- Location of Gibson in Gibson County, Tennessee.
- Coordinates: 35°52′31″N 88°50′49″W
- Country: United States
- State: Tennessee
- County: Gibson

Area
  - Total: 0.61 sq mi (1.58 km^{2})
  - Land: 0.61 sq mi (1.58 km^{2})
  - Water: 0 sq mi (0.00 km^{2})
- Elevation: 404 ft (123 m)

Population (2020)
  - Total: 366
  - Density: 599.2/sq mi (231.34/km^{2})
- Time zone: UTC-6 (Central (CST))
  - Summer (DST): UTC-5 (CDT)
- ZIP code: 38338
- Area code: 731
- FIPS code: 47-29020
- GNIS feature ID: 1285337

Gibson, once known as Pickettville in the 1800s, is a town in Gibson County, Tennessee. As of the 2020 census, Gibson had a population of 366.

== Geography ==
Gibson is located at 35°52′31″N 88°50′49″W.

According to the United States Census Bureau, the town has a total area of 0.5 square miles (1.3 km^{2}), all land.

== Demographics ==
Historical population
| Census | Pop. | Note | %± |
|---|---|---|---|
| 1880 | 131 | | — |
| 1910 | 233 | | — |
| 1920 | 249 | | 6.9% |
| 1930 | 302 | | 21.3% |
| 1940 | 284 | | −6.0% |
| 1950 | 308 | | 8.5% |
| 1960 | 297 | | −3.6% |
| 1970 | 302 | | 1.7% |
| 1980 | 458 | | 51.7% |
| 1990 | 281 | | −38.6% |
| 2000 | 305 | | 8.5% |
| 2010 | 396 | | 29.8% |
| 2020 | 366 | | −7.6% |

As of the census of 2000, there were 305 people, 114 households, and 84 families residing in the town. The population density was 560.7 inhabitants per square mile (216.5/km^{2}). There were 131 housing units at an average density of 240.8 per square mile (93.0/km^{2}). The racial makeup of the town was 91.80% White, 4.59% African American, 1.97% Native American, 0.33% Asian, and 1.31% from two or more races.

There were 114 households, out of which 36.8% had children under the age of 18 living with them, 61.4% were married couples living together, 10.5% had a female householder with no husband present, and 26.3% were non-families. 16.7% of all households were made up of individuals, and 7.0% had someone living alone who was 65 years of age or older. The average household size was 2.68 and the average family size was 3.07.

In the town, the population was spread out, with 27.2% under the age of 18, 9.8% from 18 to 24, 31.8% from 25 to 44, 21.0% from 45 to 64, and 10.2% who were 65 years of age or older. The median age was 34 years. For every 100 females, there were 89.4 males. For every 100 females age 18 and over, there were 88.1 males.

The median income for a household in the town was $34,792, and the median income for a family was $35,000. Males had a median income of $36,250 versus $26,250 for females. The per capita income for the town was $11,966. About 13.6% of families and 11.9% of the population were below the poverty line, including 18.5% of those under the age of eighteen and none of those 65 or over.

== Media ==
- WTPR-AM 710 "The Greatest Hits of All Time"

== Education ==
Gibson County Special School District is the area school district. South Gibson County High School is a comprehensive high school of the district in Medina, which includes Gibson in its attendance boundary.

== See also ==
- List of towns in Tennessee
