= Gibson County, Tennessee =

County in Tennessee, United States

- County
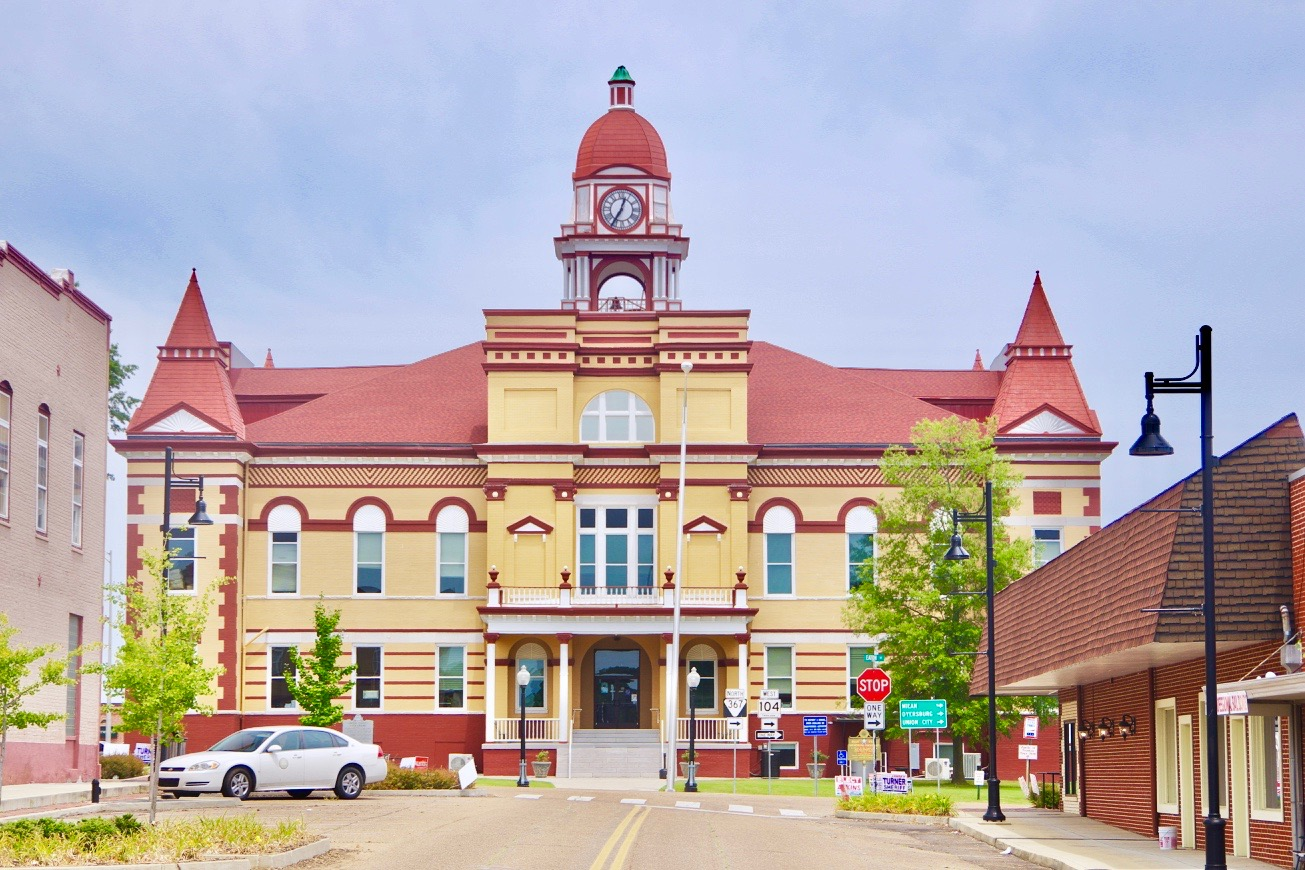
- Gibson County Courthouse in Trenton

- Location within the U.S. state of Tennessee
- Coordinates: 36°00′N 88°56′W
- Country: United States
- State: Tennessee
- Founded: 1823
- Named for: John H. Gibson
- Seat: Trenton
- Largest city: Milan

Area
  - Total: 604 sq mi (1,560 km^{2})
  - Land: 603 sq mi (1,560 km^{2})
  - Water: 0.9 sq mi (2.3 km^{2}) 0.2%

Population (2020)
  - Total: 50,429
  - Estimate (2025): 51,779 ▲
  - Density: 82/sq mi (32/km^{2})
- Time zone: UTC−6 (Central)
  - Summer (DST): UTC−5 (CDT)
- Congressional district: 8th
- Website: https://gibsontn.org/

Gibson County is a county located in the U.S. state of Tennessee. As of the 2020 census, the population was 50,429. Its county seat is Trenton. Gibson County is included in the Jackson metropolitan area.

The county was formed in 1823 and named for John H. Gibson, a soldier of the Natchez Expedition and the Creek War.

== History ==
Gibson County Sheriff's Department

Jurisdictional structure
- Operations jurisdiction: Gibson, Tennessee, United States
- Area: 604 sq mi
- Legal jurisdiction: As per operations jurisdiction
- General nature: Local civilian police

Operational structure
- Agency executive: Paul Thomas, Sheriff

Facilities
- Stations: 1
- Jails: 1

Gibson County is located in what was known as "Indian Land": territory that was legally occupied by Chickasaw Native American people. The Chickasaw Cession, proclaimed on January 7, 1819, eliminated those rights and opened the region to settlement and exploitation by white settlers and speculators.

Soon after the Chickasaw Cession, the first log cabin in what was to become Gibson County had been built by Thomas Fite about eight miles (13 km) east of present-day Trenton. From 1819 the area was part of Carroll County but, as settlement progressed, citizens petitioned for the formation of a new county. The county was established by private act on October 21, 1823, and was named in honor of Colonel John H. Gibson who had died earlier that year. Gibson was a native of Bedford County, Tennessee who was commissioned Lieutenant in the Tennessee Militia; he took part in the War of 1812, the campaign to Natchez of 1813, and fought in the Creek Wars of 1813.

In its early years, Gibson County grew rapidly, chiefly because the land had less dense forest growth than some adjacent areas and was therefore more easily prepared to farm cotton and corn. By the end of 1824, the county had 273,143 acres (1,105.37 km^{2}) of taxable land. The county's first cotton gin was built in 1826.

== Geography ==
According to the U.S. Census Bureau, the county has a total area of 604 square miles (1,560 km^{2}), of which 603 square miles (1,560 km^{2}) is land and 0.9 square miles (2.3 km^{2}) (0.2%) is water.

=== Adjacent counties ===
- Weakley County (northeast)
- Carroll County (east)
- Madison County (south)
- Crockett County (southwest)
- Dyer County (west)
- Obion County (northwest)

=== State protected areas ===
- Horns Bluff Refuge (part)
- Maness Swamp Refuge
- Obion River Wildlife Management Area (part)
- Tigrett Wildlife Management Area (part)

== Demographics ==
Historical population
Census	Pop.	Note	%±
1830	5,801		—
1840	13,689		136.0%
1850	19,548		42.8%
1860	21,777		11.4%
1870	25,666		17.9%
1880	32,685		27.3%
1890	33,859		3.6%
1900	39,408		16.4%
1910	41,630		5.6%
1920	43,388		4.2%
1930	46,528		7.2%
1940	44,835		−3.6%
1950	48,132		7.4%
1960	44,699		−7.1%
1970	47,871		7.1%
1980	49,467		3.3%
1990	46,315		−6.4%
2000	48,152		4.0%
2010	49,683		3.2%
2020	50,429		1.5%
2025 (est.)	51,779	▲	2.7%
U.S. Decennial Census; 1790–1960 1900–1990; 1990–2000 2010–2014

=== 2020 census ===
As of the 2020 census, there were 50,429 people, 20,130 households, and 12,987 families residing in the county; the median age was 40.8 years.

24.1% of residents were under the age of 18 and 19.0% of residents were 65 years of age or older. For every 100 females there were 92.7 males, and for every 100 females age 18 and over there were 88.5 males age 18 and over.

The racial makeup of the county was 75.9% White, 17.8% Black or African American, 0.3% American Indian and Alaska Native, 0.4% Asian, <0.1% Native Hawaiian and Pacific Islander, 1.5% from some other race, and 4.2% from two or more races. Hispanic or Latino residents of any race comprised 2.9% of the population.

Gibson County racial composition
Race	Num.	Perc.
White (non-Hispanic)	37,930	75.21%
Black or African American (non-Hispanic)	8,929	17.71%
Native American	97	0.19%
Asian	200	0.4%
Pacific Islander	15	0.03%
Other/Mixed	1,819	3.61%
Hispanic or Latino	1,439	2.85%

29.2% of residents lived in urban areas, while 70.8% lived in rural areas.

There were 20,130 households in the county, of which 31.9% had children under the age of 18 living in them. Of all households, 46.1% were married-couple households, 17.3% were households with a male householder and no spouse or partner present, and 30.7% were households with a female householder and no spouse or partner present. About 28.9% of all households were made up of individuals and 13.8% had someone living alone who was 65 years of age or older.

There were 22,313 housing units, of which 9.8% were vacant. Among occupied housing units, 68.4% were owner-occupied and 31.6% were renter-occupied. The homeowner vacancy rate was 2.1% and the rental vacancy rate was 7.6%.

=== 2000 census ===
As of the census of 2000, there were 48,152 people, 19,518 households, and 13,584 families residing in the county. The population density was 80 people per square mile (31 people/km^{2}). There were 21,059 housing units at an average density of 35 units per square mile (14/km^{2}). The racial makeup of the county was 78.66% White, 19.72% Black or African American, 0.20% Native American, 0.14% Asian, 0.02% Pacific Islander, 0.50% from other races, and 0.76% from two or more races. 1.12% of the population were Hispanic or Latino of any race.

There were 19,518 households, out of which 30.20% had children under the age of 18 living with them, 52.20% were married couples living together, 13.60% had a female householder with no husband present, and 30.40% were non-families. 27.40% of all households were made up of individuals, and 13.70% had someone living alone who was 65 years of age or older. The average household size was 2.41 and the average family size was 2.93.

In the county, the population was spread out, with 24.00% under the age of 18, 8.10% from 18 to 24, 26.90% from 25 to 44, 23.30% from 45 to 64, and 17.70% who were 65 years of age or older. The median age was 39 years. For every 100 females there were 89.50 males. For every 100 females age 18 and over, there were 85.80 males.

The median income for a household in the county was $31,105, and the median income for a family was $39,318. Males had a median income of $30,360 versus $21,351 for females. The per capita income for the county was $16,320. About 9.40% of families and 12.80% of the population were below the poverty line, including 17.00% of those under age 18 and 15.30% of those age 65 or over.

== Transportation ==
=== Airports ===
There are two airports located in Gibson County:

- Humboldt Municipal Airport (M53), which is owned by City of Humboldt.
- Gibson County Airport (TGC), located midway between Trenton and Milan and owned by City of Milan and Gibson Co.

== Court system ==
Trenton is the county seat. However, since just after the Civil War, Gibson County's court system has been geographically divided, with both Trenton and Humboldt serving as venues for the county's civil and criminal cases.

== Education ==
Gibson County has five special school districts: Bradford, Gibson County, Humboldt, Milan and Trenton.

Each district has its own school board and director of schools. There are six high schools in the county.

=== High schools ===
School	Location	Mascot	Colors
Bradford High School	Bradford	Red Devils	
Gibson County High School	Dyer	Pioneers	
Humboldt High School	Humboldt	Vikings	
Milan High School	Milan	Bulldogs	
Peabody High School	Trenton	Golden Tide	
South Gibson County High School	Medina	Hornets	

== Media ==
=== Radio stations ===
- Victory 93.7 - The Victory 93.7 FM—WTKB ATWOOD-MILAN
- WJPJ AM 1190 & 99.9 "La Poderosa 99.9 FM & 1190 AM"
- WTJK 105.3 "K 105.3" (Classic Hits)

=== Newspapers ===
- Tennessee Magnet Publications (free monthly), based in Huntingdon, but circulates in Gibson and Dyer counties
- The Tri-City Reporter, Dyer
- The Gazette, Trenton
- The Chronicle, Humboldt
- The Mirror-Exchange, Milan

== Events ==
The Gibson County Fair is held each August in Trenton. The fair is billed as the "oldest continuously running fair in the South." The fair was first held in 1856 and has been held annually since 1869.

Beginning early in 1981, John W. Melton, administrator of the Gibson County General Hospital developed the idea of a “teapot festival;” to draw attention on the rare collection of Porcelain Veilleuses. The festival has grown into a week long event beginning with a ceremonial Lighting of the Teapots and culminates in the Annual Grand Parade. The Teapot Festival begins with the lighting of the teapots ceremony at City Hall. Music and fireworks show highlight the first evening of the festival. Other highlights include a parade and the chocolate extravaganza. Tennis and softball tournaments, along with other athletic competitions, are featured each day during the festival. An arts & crafts show, antique car exhibition, fireworks, display and street dance highlight the final day of the event. The teapots may be viewed all year round, 7 days a week, 24 hours a day.

The West Tennessee Strawberry Festival had been held annually during the first full week of May in Humboldt since 1934. The festival has drawn up to 100,000 people from across the area. Popular festival events include Thursday's traditional Jr. Parade, which is one of the world's largest non-motorized parades, Friday's Grand Floats Parade, the Horse Show, Governor's Luncheon, Carnival, Prayer Breakfast, Car Show, Berry Idol singing contest, 5K and 10K Runs, Shortcake in the Park, multiple concerts, beauty reviews and more.

== Communities ==
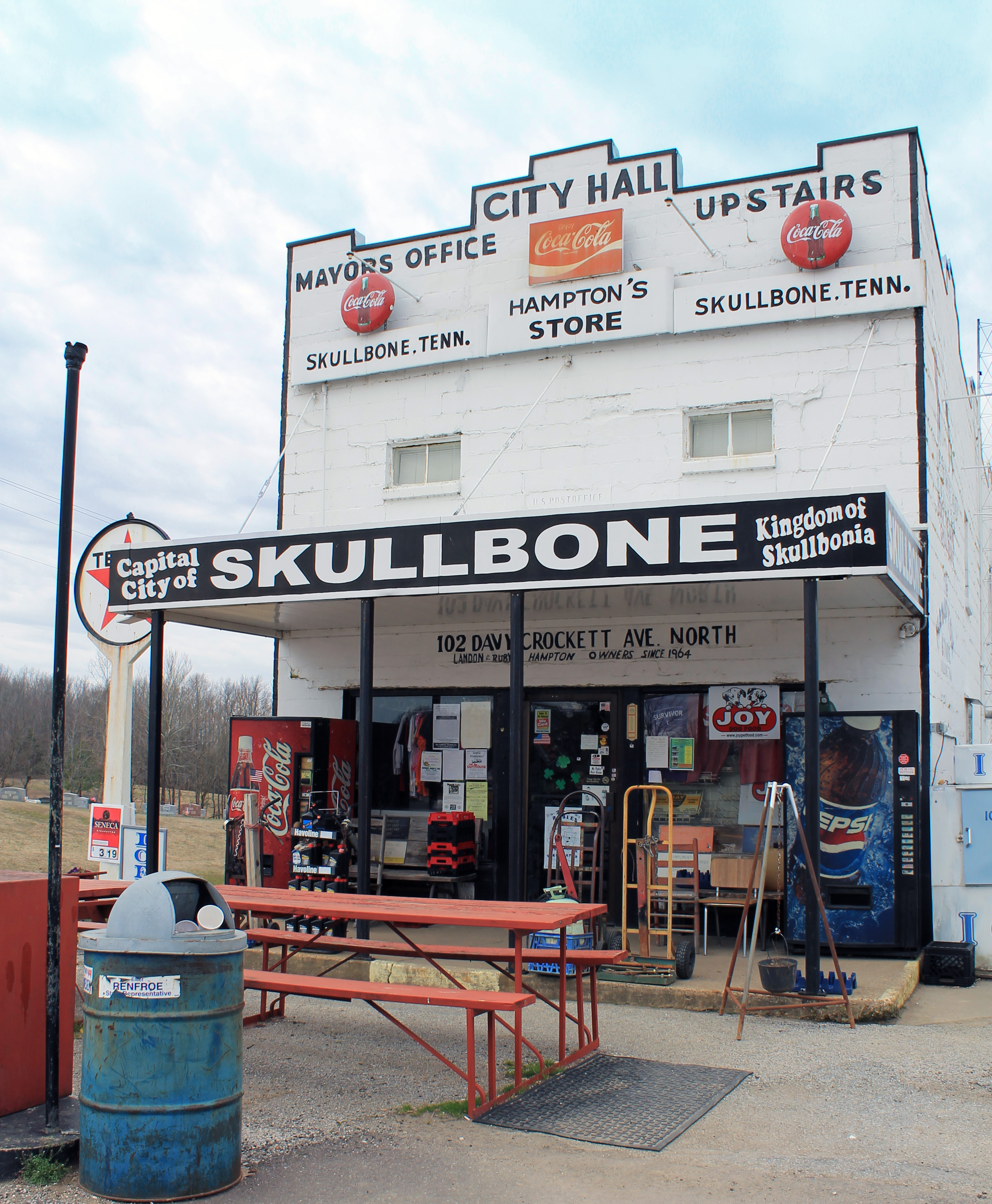
Skullbone

=== Cities ===
- Dyer
- Humboldt (partly in Madison County)
- Medina
- Milan
- Trenton (county seat)
- Yorkville

=== Towns ===
- Bradford
- Gibson
- Kenton (partly in Obion County)
- Rutherford

=== Unincorporated communities ===
- Brazil
- Eaton
- Frog Jump
- Fruitland
- Graball
- Hopewell
- Idlewild
- Skullbone

== Politics ==
Gibson County has voted for the Republican in the last six presidential elections. The last Democrat to carry this county was Al Gore in 2000.

United States presidential election results for Gibson County, Tennessee
Year	Republican		Democratic		Third party(ies)	
Year	No.	%	No.	%	No.	%
1912	1,002	23.71%	2,671	63.20%	553	13.09%
1916	1,443	28.44%	3,609	71.13%	22	0.43%
1920	3,209	34.99%	5,942	64.80%	19	0.21%
1924	1,037	24.05%	3,235	75.04%	39	0.90%
1928	1,365	31.95%	2,898	67.84%	9	0.21%
1932	704	14.96%	3,972	84.42%	29	0.62%
1936	958	16.72%	4,744	82.79%	28	0.49%
1940	1,233	19.40%	5,103	80.29%	20	0.31%
1944	1,568	25.24%	4,632	74.57%	12	0.19%
1948	1,137	19.04%	3,917	65.60%	917	15.36%
1952	3,766	35.90%	6,687	63.74%	38	0.36%
1956	3,481	29.72%	7,884	67.31%	348	2.97%
1960	5,173	45.66%	5,796	51.16%	360	3.18%
1964	4,614	36.24%	8,119	63.76%	0	0.00%
1968	4,093	26.77%	3,962	25.92%	7,233	47.31%
1972	9,900	71.05%	3,625	26.02%	409	2.94%
1976	5,563	34.70%	10,356	64.60%	112	0.70%
1980	6,792	40.13%	9,829	58.08%	302	1.78%
1984	9,484	52.71%	8,334	46.32%	174	0.97%
1988	8,415	52.47%	7,542	47.03%	81	0.51%
1992	7,161	39.06%	9,555	52.12%	1,616	8.82%
1996	6,614	40.26%	8,851	53.88%	963	5.86%
2000	8,286	48.35%	8,663	50.55%	188	1.10%
2004	10,596	55.13%	8,511	44.28%	114	0.59%
2008	13,516	63.60%	7,406	34.85%	331	1.56%
2012	12,883	65.51%	6,564	33.38%	220	1.12%
2016	13,786	70.53%	5,258	26.90%	503	2.57%
2020	16,259	72.80%	5,771	25.84%	305	1.37%
2024	16,346	75.51%	5,100	23.56%	202	0.93%

== Notable natives ==
- Doug Atkins, Hall of Fame NFL football player
- Wallace Wade, football coach
- Avery Williamson, NFL linebacker

== See also ==
- National Register of Historic Places listings in Gibson County, Tennessee
