= Humboldt, Tennessee =

- City
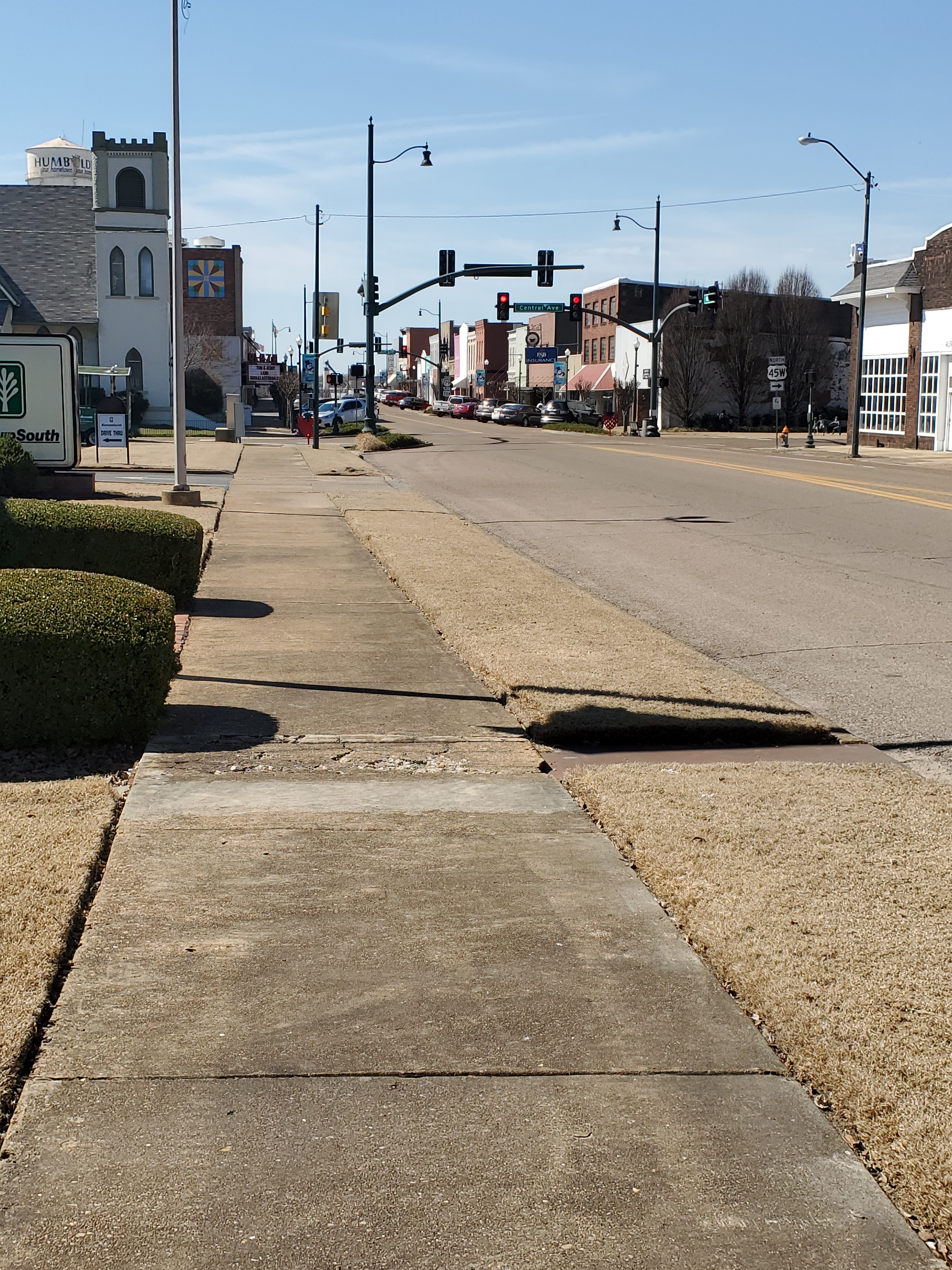
- Downtown Humboldt

- Location of Humboldt in Gibson County, Tennessee.

- Location within Tennessee Location within the United States
- Coordinates: 35°49′21″N 88°54′40″W
- Country: United States
- State: Tennessee
- Counties: Gibson, Madison

Government
  - Mayor: Arthur Boykin

Area
  - Total: 10.39 sq mi (26.90 km^{2})
  - Land: 10.37 sq mi (26.87 km^{2})
  - Water: 0.012 sq mi (0.03 km^{2})
- Elevation: 364 ft (111 m)

Population (2020)
  - Total: 7,874
  - Density: 758.9/sq mi (293.01/km^{2})
- Time zone: UTC-6 (Central (CST))
  - Summer (DST): UTC-5 (CDT)
- ZIP code: 38343
- Area code: 731
- FIPS code: 47-36460
- GNIS feature ID: 1288697
- Website: www.humboldthistorical.com www.humboldtchamber.com http://welcometohumboldt.com/ https://www.cityofhumboldt.net/

Humboldt is a city in Gibson and Madison counties, Tennessee. As of the 2020 census, Humboldt had a population of 7,874. It is the principal city of and is included in the Humboldt, Tennessee Micropolitan Statistical Area, which is included in the Jackson–Henderson–Humboldt, Tennessee Metropolitan Area.

== History ==
The first settlers of what would become Humboldt, began moving into the area in the mid-1850s. The town was a Railroad town. Its history begins with the Crossing of the Mobile & Ohio and the Memphis & Ohio (later L&N) Railroads. This was completed in 1859. The town wasn't chartered until after the Civil War in 1866.

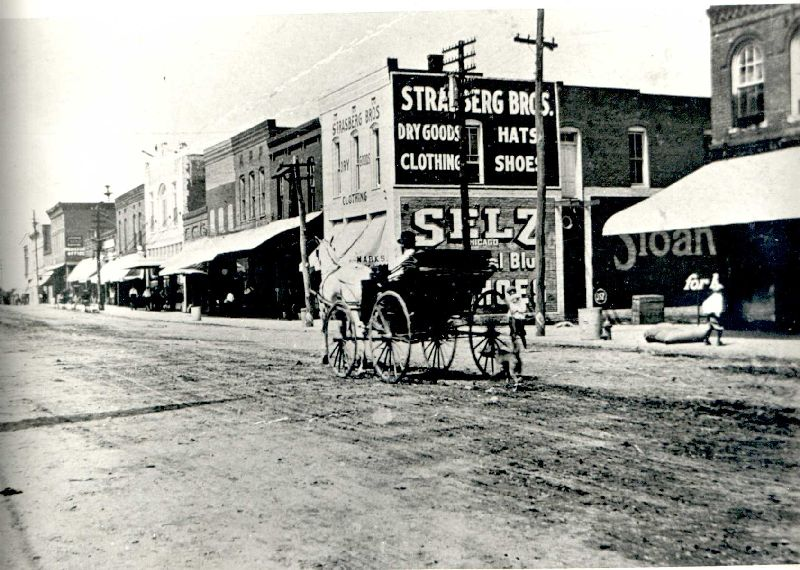
Downtown Humboldt in 1901

The city is named for German naturalist Alexander von Humboldt.

== Geography ==
Humboldt is located at 35°49′21″N 88°54′40″W (35.822564, −88.911138). Most of the city lies in Gibson County, with only a small portion extending into Madison County. In the 2000 census, 9,442 of the city's 9,467 residents (99.7%) lived in Gibson County and 25 (0.3%) in Madison County.

According to the United States Census Bureau, the city has a total area of 9.7 square miles (25 km^{2}), of which 9.7 square miles (25.0 km^{2}) is land and 0.10% is water.

== Demographics ==
Historical population
Census	Pop.	Note	%±
1880	1,572		—
1890	1,837		16.9%
1900	2,866		56.0%
1910	3,446		20.2%
1920	3,913		13.6%
1930	4,613		17.9%
1940	5,160		11.9%
1950	7,428		44.0%
1960	8,482		14.2%
1970	10,066		18.7%
1980	10,209		1.4%
1990	9,651		−5.5%
2000	9,467		−1.9%
2010	8,452		−10.7%
2020	7,874		−6.8%

=== 2020 census ===
As of the 2020 census, there was a population of 7,874, with 3,364 households and 2,052 families residing in the city.

The median age was 44.0 years. 22.3% of residents were under the age of 18 and 23.0% of residents were 65 years of age or older. For every 100 females there were 84.8 males, and for every 100 females age 18 and over there were 79.8 males age 18 and over.

90.9% of residents lived in urban areas, while 9.1% lived in rural areas.

There were 3,364 households in Humboldt, of which 26.0% had children under the age of 18 living in them. Of all households, 29.5% were married-couple households, 20.7% were households with a male householder and no spouse or partner present, and 43.5% were households with a female householder and no spouse or partner present. About 37.6% of all households were made up of individuals and 17.5% had someone living alone who was 65 years of age or older.

There were 3,956 housing units, of which 15.0% were vacant. The homeowner vacancy rate was 2.7% and the rental vacancy rate was 10.6%.

Racial composition as of the 2020 census
Race	Number	Percent
White	3,552	45.1%
Black or African American	3,718	47.2%
American Indian and Alaska Native	24	0.3%
Asian	15	0.2%
Native Hawaiian and Other Pacific Islander	4	0.1%
Some other race	241	3.1%
Two or more races	320	4.1%
Hispanic or Latino (of any race)	352	4.5%

=== 2000 census ===
As of the census of 2000, there was a population of 9,467, with 3,864 households and 2,538 families residing in the city. The population density was 980.0 inhabitants per square mile (378.4/km^{2}). There were 4,243 housing units at an average density of 439.2 units per square mile (169.6 units/km^{2}). The racial makeup of the city was 55.06% White, 43.00% African American, 0.25% Native American, 0.06% Asian, 1.00% from other races, and 0.61% from two or more races. Hispanic or Latino of any race were 1.56% of the population.

There were 3,864 households, out of which 28.5% had children under the age of 18 living with them, 41.4% were married couples living together, 20.0% had a female householder with no husband present, and 34.3% were non-families. 30.8% of all households were made up of individuals, and 14.8% had someone living alone who was 65 years of age or older. The average household size was 2.36 and the average family size was 2.93.

In the city, the population was spread out, with 24.0% under the age of 18, 8.8% from 18 to 24, 24.7% from 25 to 44, 22.1% from 45 to 64, and 20.4% who were 65 years of age or older. The median age was 39 years. For every 100 females, there were 86.4 males. For every 100 females age 18 and over, there were 80.0 males.

The median income for a household in the city was $26,351, and the median income for a family was $32,845. Males had a median income of $30,848 versus $20,890 for females. The per capita income for the city was $14,433. About 16.1% of families and 18.1% of the population were below the poverty line, including 24.8% of those under age 18 and 16.9% of those age 65 or over.

== Climate ==
The climate in this area is characterized by relatively high temperatures and evenly distributed precipitation throughout the year. According to the Köppen Climate Classification system, Humboldt has a Humid subtropical climate, abbreviated "Cfa" on climate maps.

Climate data for Humboldt, Tennessee
Month	Jan	Feb	Mar	Apr	May	Jun	Jul	Aug	Sep	Oct	Nov	Dec	Year
Mean daily maximum °F (°C)	50 (10)	53 (12)	61 (16)	72 (22)	80 (27)	88 (31)	91 (33)	91 (33)	85 (29)	75 (24)	61 (16)	52 (11)	72 (22)
Mean daily minimum °F (°C)	31 (−1)	33 (1)	39 (4)	49 (9)	57 (14)	65 (18)	68 (20)	67 (19)	60 (16)	48 (9)	38 (3)	33 (1)	49 (9)
Average precipitation inches (mm)	6.4 (160)	4.8 (120)	5.3 (130)	4.5 (110)	4 (100)	4.2 (110)	4.6 (120)	3.4 (86)	3.4 (86)	2.6 (66)	4.3 (110)	4.4 (110)	51.8 (1,320)
Source: Weatherbase

== Transportation ==
=== Road ===
U.S. Route 79 and U.S. Route 45W intersect in Humboldt. Interstate 40 is about 13 miles (21 km) away in Jackson, and Interstate 155 is about 36 miles (58 km) away in Dyersburg.

=== Air ===
The city-owned Humboldt Municipal Airport is located in Gibson County. The nearest airports with regularly scheduled commercial service are Memphis International, about 90 miles (140 km) away, and Nashville International, about 150 miles (240 km) away.

=== Rail ===
The Newbern–Dyersburg train station is about 36 miles (58 km) away in Newbern, and Memphis Central Station is about 90 miles (140 km) away.

== Media ==
=== Newspaper ===
The local newspaper is called the Humboldt Chronicle.

=== Radio ===
- WTJK 105.3 "K 105.3 FM"(Classic Hits).
- WJPJ AM 1190 & 99.9 "La Poderosa 99.9 FM & 1190 AM"
- WIRJ AM 740
- WZDQ FM 102.3 "102.3 The Rocket"

== Education ==
In the Gibson County portion, the majority of the area is in the Humboldt City School District. A small portion is in the Gibson County Special School District.

All areas of Madison County are in the Jackson-Madison County School System.

== Special events ==
Since 1934, the city has hosted the West Tennessee Strawberry Festival, held the first full week of May.

== Notable people ==
- Doug Atkins – NFL Hall of Fame football player
- Chick Autry – baseball player
- Tony Champion – CFL All Star football player
- Fred Craddock – professor of preaching
- John Craddock - "Grady" radio personality
- Jesse Hill Ford – writer and playwright
- Lew Jetton – musician, television personality
- Valerie June – singer/songwriter
- Wyatt Prunty – poet
- Kacy Rodgers – NFL assistant football coach
- T.G. Sheppard – singer/Songwriter
- Trey Smith (offensive lineman) – NFL offensive lineman, Super Bowl LVII champion
- Dale Sommers – radio personality
- Bailey Walsh – politician
- Murray Warmath – college football coach
- Samuel Cole Williams – historian
