= Trenton, Tennessee =

- City
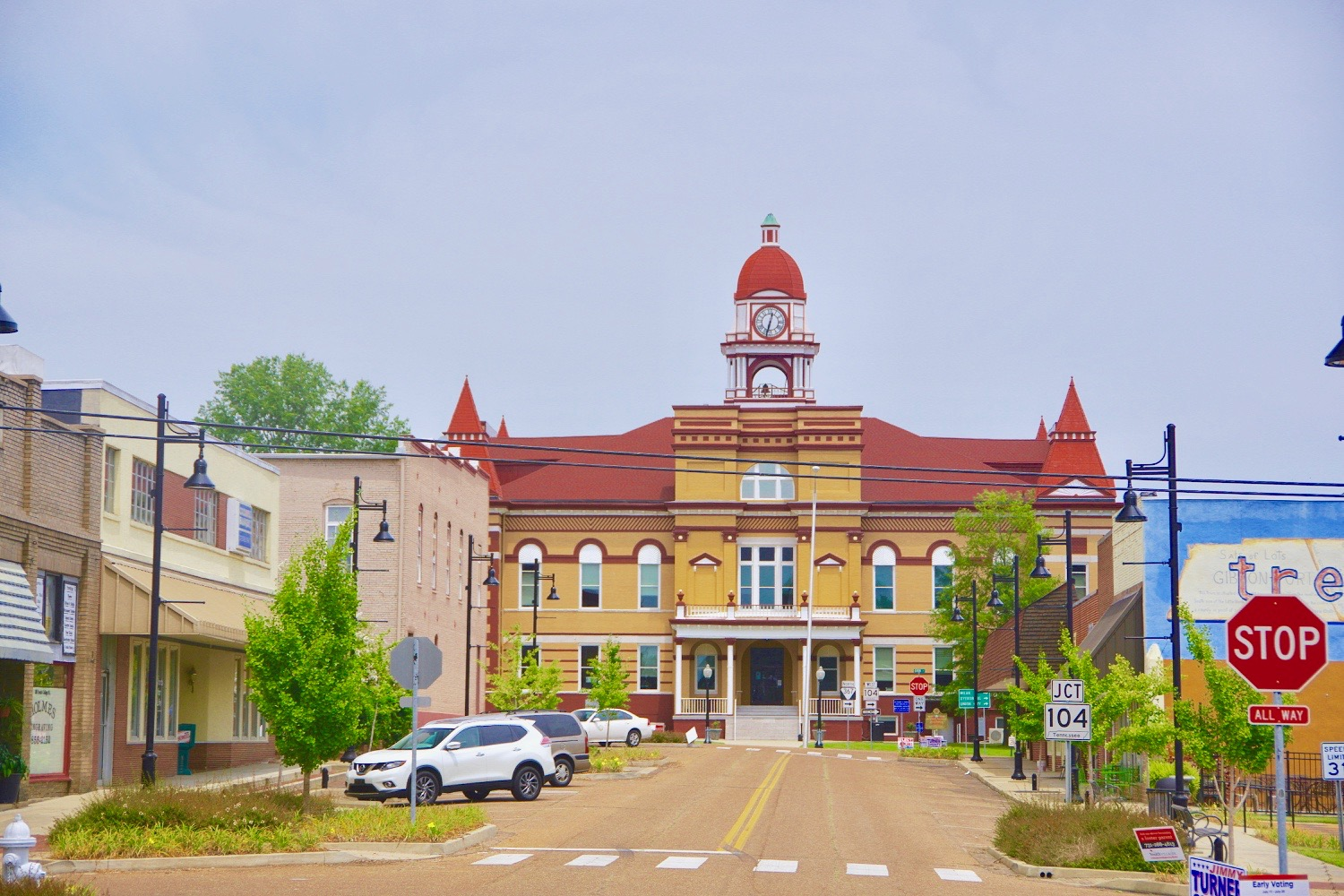
- Gibson County Courthouse
- Motto: A tea-rrific place to live!
- Location of Trenton in Gibson County, Tennessee.

- Location within Tennessee Location within the United States
- Coordinates: 35°58′25″N 88°56′30″W
- Country: United States
- State: Tennessee
- County: Gibson
- Established: 1824
- Incorporated: 1847
- Named after: Trenton, New Jersey

Government
  - Mayor: Tony Burriss (2023 - )

Area
  - Total: 8.09 sq mi (20.95 km^{2})
  - Land: 8.03 sq mi (20.81 km^{2})
  - Water: 0.054 sq mi (0.14 km^{2})
- Elevation: 331 ft (101 m)

Population (2020)
  - Total: 4,240
  - Density: 528/sq mi (203.7/km^{2})
- Time zone: UTC-6 (Central (CST))
  - Summer (DST): UTC-5 (CDT)
- ZIP code: 38382
- Area code: 731
- FIPS code: 47-75000
- GNIS feature ID: 1304159
- Website: trentontn.net

Trenton is the county seat and fourth largest city of Gibson County, Tennessee, United States. As of the 2020 census, the population was 4,240.

== History ==
Trenton was established in 1824 as a county seat for the newly created Gibson County. The site was initially home to a trading post known as "Gibson-Port" that was operated by Thomas Gibson, a brother of the county's namesake, Colonel John Gibson. The city is named for Trenton, New Jersey.

== Geography ==
Trenton is located in central Gibson County at 35°58′25″N 88°56′30″W (35.973627, −88.941569). U.S. Route 45W passes through the east side of the city, bypassing downtown. It leads north 33 miles (53 km) to Union City and south 30 miles (48 km) to Jackson. Milan is 12 miles (19 km) to the southeast via Tennessee State Route 77, Bradford is 10 miles (16 km) to the northeast via State Route 54, Alamo is 18 miles (29 km) to the southwest, also via State Route 54, and Dyersburg is 26 miles (42 km) to the west via State Route 104.

According to the United States Census Bureau, the city of Trenton has a total area of 8.2 square miles (21.2 km^{2}), of which 8.1 square miles (21.1 km^{2}) are land and 0.04 square miles (0.1 km^{2}), or 0.64%, are water.

== Demographics ==
Historical population
| Census | Pop. | Note | %± |
|---|---|---|---|
| 1850 | 694 | | — |
| 1860 | 1,908 | | 174.9% |
| 1870 | 1,900 | | −0.4% |
| 1880 | 1,383 | | −27.2% |
| 1890 | 1,693 | | 22.4% |
| 1900 | 2,328 | | 37.5% |
| 1910 | 2,402 | | 3.2% |
| 1920 | 2,751 | | 14.5% |
| 1930 | 2,892 | | 5.1% |
| 1940 | 3,400 | | 17.6% |
| 1950 | 3,868 | | 13.8% |
| 1960 | 4,225 | | 9.2% |
| 1970 | 4,226 | | 0.0% |
| 1980 | 4,601 | | 8.9% |
| 1990 | 4,836 | | 5.1% |
| 2000 | 4,683 | | −3.2% |
| 2010 | 4,264 | | −8.9% |
| 2020 | 4,240 | | −0.6% |

=== 2020 census ===
Racial composition as of the 2020 census
| Race | Number | Percent |
|---|---|---|
| White | 2,716 | 64.1% |
| Black or African American | 1,225 | 28.9% |
| American Indian and Alaska Native | 15 | 0.4% |
| Asian | 18 | 0.4% |
| Native Hawaiian and Other Pacific Islander | 2 | 0.0% |
| Some other race | 76 | 1.8% |
| Two or more races | 188 | 4.4% |
| Hispanic or Latino (of any race) | 177 | 4.2% |

As of the 2020 census, Trenton had a population of 4,240 living in 1,782 households, including 910 families. The median age was 40.7 years, 21.4% of residents were under the age of 18, and 20.5% of residents were 65 years of age or older. For every 100 females there were 90.4 males, and for every 100 females age 18 and over there were 88.8 males age 18 and over.

There were 1,782 households in Trenton, of which 27.3% had children under the age of 18 living in them. Of all households, 29.5% were married-couple households, 19.1% were households with a male householder and no spouse or partner present, and 44.5% were households with a female householder and no spouse or partner present. About 40.9% of all households were made up of individuals and 19.8% had someone living alone who was 65 years of age or older.

There were 2,010 housing units, of which 11.3% were vacant. The homeowner vacancy rate was 4.4% and the rental vacancy rate was 6.9%.

0.0% of residents lived in urban areas, while 100.0% lived in rural areas.

=== 2000 census ===
As of the census of 2000, there was a population of 4,683, with 1,919 households and 1,207 families residing in the city. The population density was 847.3 inhabitants per square mile (327.1/km^{2}). There were 2,090 housing units at an average density of 378.2 per square mile (146.0/km^{2}). The racial makeup of the city was 65.17% White, 32.67% African American, 0.09% Native American, 0.26% Asian, 0.98% from other races, and 0.83% from two or more races. Hispanic or Latino of any race were 1.71% of the population.

There were 1,919 households, out of which 29.1% had children under the age of 18 living with them, 38.9% were married couples living together, 20.6% had a female householder with no husband present, and 37.1% were non-families. 34.1% of all households were made up of individuals, and 16.2% had someone living alone who was 65 years of age or older. The average household size was 2.29 and the average family size was 2.90.

In the city, the population was spread out, with 24.2% under the age of 18, 9.1% from 18 to 24, 26.1% from 25 to 44, 22.4% from 45 to 64, and 18.2% who were 65 years of age or older. The median age was 38 years. For every 100 females, there were 84.3 males. For every 100 females age 18 and over, there were 81.2 males.

The median income for a household in the city was $27,535, and the median income for a family was $39,630. Males had a median income of $29,675 versus $20,801 for females. The per capita income for the city was $16,225. About 12.9% of families and 17.6% of the population were below the poverty line, including 26.4% of those under age 18 and 19.5% of those age 65 or over.

== Culture ==
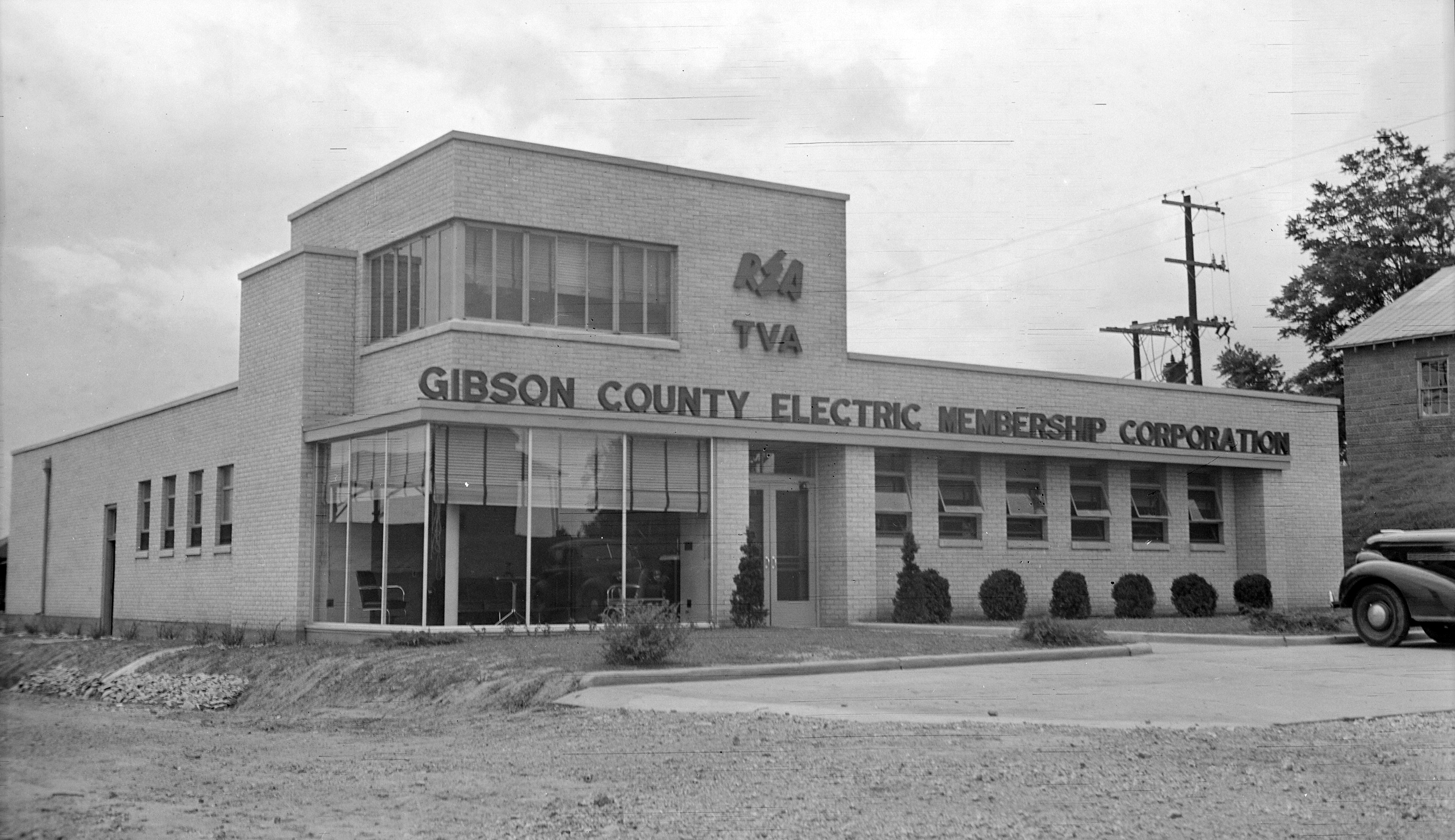
The Gibson County Electric Membership Corporation which is still located Trenton, in 1940

Trenton is most famous for its collection of rare antique porcelain veilleuses, donated by the late Dr. Frederick C. Freed in 1955. The teapots are unique because the candle's glow illuminates the pot's exterior, thus serving as a night light. None of the 525 teapots in this collection are alike, and some are designed as palaces or people in unique still-life castings. The town celebrates its collection with an annual "Teapot Festival" held each spring since 1981.

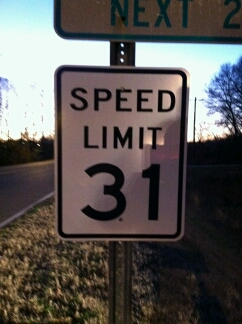
A 31 mph speed limit sign in Trenton

Trenton is also known for its unusual speed limit of 31 miles per hour (50 km/h), established by the city in the 1950s and posted by signs throughout the town.

Nite Lite Theatre of Gibson County is a non-profit community theatre project based in Trenton, and established in 1980 with the intent of bringing theatrical presentations to Gibson and the surrounding counties. All work, with the exception of some production staff, is done on a volunteer basis. With most performances at Peabody High School, the history of Nite Lite Theatre includes performances of The Man Who Came to Dinner, The Sound of Music, Dearly Departed, and You Can't Take It with You.

== Notable people ==
- Robert M. Bond, United States Air Force general
- Dave Brown, meteorologist and weatherman for Memphis TV station WMC channel 5, an NBC affiliate
- Eugenia Winwood (née Crafton), wife of Steve Winwood
- John Wesley Crockett, member of the United States House of Representatives who was born in Trenton
- Gene Hickerson, Hall of Fame offensive lineman for the Cleveland Browns was born in Trenton
- Lew Jetton, known as a blues guitarist/singer, while also spending many years as a meteorologist and local television personality, was raised near Trenton
- Ben H. Love, eighth Chief Scout Executive of the Boy Scouts of America
- Peter Matthew Hillsman Taylor, author of the novel A Summons to Memphis, which won the Pulitzer Prize for Fiction in 1987
- Wallace Wade, college football coach
- Bailey Walsh, politician
- William Woods, Major League Baseball pitcher

== Education ==
Trenton Special School District includes Trenton, and operates Trenton's K-12 public schools.

Peabody High School in Trenton was established in 1877. Jackson State Community College has a campus adjacent to Peabody High School.

== Media ==
Radio stations:

- WPOT AM 1500 (simulcast with WJPJ) GoodNews Christian Network
- WTPR-AM 710 "The Greatest Hits of All Time"

=== Newspapers ===
- The Gazette (formerly The Herald Gazette)

== Sports ==
The Trenton Reds, a Minor League Baseball team of the Kentucky–Illinois–Tennessee League, played in Trenton in 1922. The city shared the same league's Milan-Trenton Twins with nearby Milan in 1923.
