= National Register of Historic Places listings in Henry County, Tennessee =

Location of Henry County in Tennessee

This is a list of the National Register of Historic Places listings in Henry County, Tennessee.

This is intended to be a complete list of the properties and districts on the National Register of Historic Places in Henry County, Tennessee, United States. Latitude and longitude coordinates are provided for many National Register properties and districts; these locations may be seen together in a map.

There are 15 properties and districts listed on the National Register in the county, and one formerly listed property.

Contents: Counties in Tennessee
Anderson – Bedford – Benton – Bledsoe – Blount – Bradley – Campbell – Cannon – Carroll – Carter – Cheatham – Chester – Claiborne – Clay – Cocke – Coffee – Crockett – Cumberland – Davidson – Decatur – DeKalb – Dickson – Dyer – Fayette – Fentress – Franklin – Gibson – Giles – Grainger – Greene – Grundy – Hamblen – Hamilton – Hancock – Hardeman – Hardin – Hawkins – Haywood – Henderson – Henry – Hickman – Houston – Humphreys – Jackson – Jefferson – Johnson – Knox – Lake – Lauderdale – Lawrence – Lewis – Lincoln – Loudon – Macon – Madison – Marion – Marshall – Maury – McMinn – McNairy – Meigs – Monroe – Montgomery – Moore – Morgan – Obion – Overton – Perry – Pickett – Polk – Putnam – Rhea – Roane – Robertson – Rutherford – Scott – Sequatchie – Sevier – Shelby – Smith – Stewart – Sullivan – Sumner – Tipton – Trousdale – Unicoi – Union – Van Buren – Warren – Washington – Wayne – Weakley – White – Williamson – Wilson

This National Park Service list is complete through NPS recent listings posted May 9, 2025.

== Current listings ==
	Name on the Register	Image	Date listed	Location	City or town	Description
1	Barrs Chapel C.M.E. Church		November 25, 2005 (#05001335)	5560 Briarpatch Lake Rd. 36°18′19″N 88°29′11″W	Midway	
2	E.W. Grove Henry County High School	E.W. Grove Henry County High School	November 25, 1980 (#80003835)	Grove Boulevard; 36°17′34″N 88°19′45″W	Paris	
3	John L. Hagler House		March 13, 1980 (#80003836)	Northwest of Springville on Poplar Grove Rd. 36°15′42″N 88°09′43″W	Springville	
4	E.K. Jernigan House	E.K. Jernigan House	September 7, 1988 (#88001429)	207 Dunlap St. 36°18′05″N 88°19′23″W	Paris	
5	Thomas P. Jernigan House	Thomas P. Jernigan House	September 7, 1988 (#88001430)	918 Dunlap St. 36°17′27″N 88°19′34″W	Paris	
6	Robert E. Lee School	Robert E. Lee School	September 7, 1988 (#88001426)	402 Lee St. 36°18′21″N 88°19′48″W	Paris	
7	Mt. Zion Church and Cemetery	Mt. Zion Church and Cemetery	December 23, 1974 (#74001916)	Northeast of Elkhorn on the Tennessee River; 36°22′18″N 88°02′31″W	Elkhorn	
8	North Poplar Historic District	North Poplar Historic District	September 7, 1988 (#88001428)	Along sections of N. Poplar St. and E. Church St. 36°18′25″N 88°19′30″W	Paris	
9	Obion Mounds		May 7, 1973 (#73001790)	Address Restricted. 36°24′20″N 88°22′57″W	Paris	
10	Paris Commercial Historic District	Paris Commercial Historic District	September 7, 1988 (#88001424)	Along sections of E. and W. Wood, W. Washington, N. and S. Poplar, N. and S. Market, Fentress, and W. Blythe Sts. 36°18′10″N 88°19′33″W	Paris	
11	Porter House	Porter House	April 11, 1973 (#73001789)	407 S. Dunlap St. 36°17′56″N 88°19′23″W	Paris	
12	Quinn Chapel A.M.E. Church	Quinn Chapel A.M.E. Church	January 17, 2023 (#100008579)	216 Church Street; 36°18′15″N 88°19′25″W	Paris	
13	Judge John C. Sweeney House		September 7, 1988 (#88001427)	1212 Chickasaw Rd. 36°18′32″N 88°18′11″W	Paris	
14	West Paris Historic District	West Paris Historic District	September 7, 1988 (#88001432)	Along sections of W. Washington, N. College, and Hudson Sts. 36°18′14″N 88°19′50″W	Paris	
15	Charles M. White House		September 7, 1988 (#88001425)	403 Whitehall Circle; 36°17′38″N 88°19′03″W	Paris	

== Former listings ==
	Name on the Register	Image	Date listed	Date removed	Location	City or town	Description
1	H. L. Bruce House		September 7, 1988 (#88001431)	January 19, 2014	202 S. Poplar St. 36°18′04″N 88°19′32″W	Paris	

== See also ==
- List of National Historic Landmarks in Tennessee
- National Register of Historic Places listings in Tennessee
