= Tennessee State Route 140 =

State highway in Tennessee, United States

State Route 140
- SR 140 highlighted in red

Route information
- Maintained by TDOT
- Length: 43.88 mi (70.62 km)

Major junctions
- West end: SR 22 in McKenzie
- SR 54 in Como; SR 69 in Cottage Grove; US 641 in Puryear
- East end: US 79 near Paris Landing State Park

Location
- Country: United States
- State: Tennessee
- Counties: Henry

Highway system
- Tennessee State Routes; Interstate; US; State
← I-140	→ SR 141

State Route 140 (SR 140) is a west–east state highway located entirely in Henry County in northwest Tennessee.

== Route description ==
SR 140 begins at a junction with SR 22 within the city limits of McKezie in Henry County's southwestern corner between the county's western and southern boundaries with Weakley and Carroll Counties, respectively. SR 140 travels north to cross the East Fork of the Obion River and SR 54 at Como, and intersect SR 69 in the northwestern Henry County town of Cottage Grove. After a brief concurrency with SR 69, SR 140 turns due east to intersect and have a 575-foot-long (175 m) concurrency with US 641 (SR 54) in Puryear, and ends at a junction with US 79 (SR 76) at Paris Landing State Park.

== Major intersections ==
The entire route is in Henry County.

Location	mi	km	Destinations	Notes
McKenzie	0.00	0.00	SR 22 – Dresden, Gleason, Huntingdon	Western terminus
Como			SR 54 – Dresden, Paris	
Cottage Grove			SR 69 south – Paris	Western end of SR 69 concurrency; provides access to Henry County Airport
			SR 69 north – Sedalia, KY	Eastern end of SR 69 concurrency
Puryear			US 641 north (SR 54 east) – Hazel, KY, Murray, KY	Western end of US 641/SR 54 concurrency
Puryear			US 641 south (SR 54 west) – Paris	Eastern end of US 641/SR 54 concurrency
Buchanan			SR 218 west (Buchanan Road)	Eastern terminus of SR 218
Paris Landing State Park	43.88	70.62	US 79 (Austin Peay Memorial Highway/SR 76) – Dover, Paris	Eastern terminus
1.000 mi = 1.609 km; 1.000 km = 0.621 mi: Concurrency terminus
