= Bruce (disambiguation) =

Bruce is a masculine given name.

Bruce may also refer to:

== People ==
- Bruce (surname)
- Clan Bruce, a Scottish clan
- House of Bruce, a Scottish royal house
- Robert the Bruce (1274–1329), King of Scotland
- Bruce (Russian nobility), a Russian noble family of Scottish origin

== Places ==
=== Australia ===
- Bruce, Australian Capital Territory, a suburb of Canberra
- Bruce, South Australia, a town and locality
- Division of Bruce, an electoral division in Victoria

=== Canada ===
- Bruce, Alberta
  - Bruce (Alberta provincial electoral district)
- Bruce County, Ontario
  - Bruce (Ontario provincial electoral district)
  - Bruce Nuclear Generating Station
- Bruce Island (Nunavut)
- Bruce Peninsula, Ontario
- Bruce Mountains, a mountain range on Baffin Island, Nunavut
- Bruce Trail, a hiking trail in Ontario

=== New Zealand ===
- Bruce (New Zealand electorate), a former parliamentary electorate
- Bruce statistical area, a census area and ward in the Clutha District

=== United States ===
- Bruce, Florida, a place in Florida
- Bruce, Illinois, an unincorporated community
- Bruce, Minnesota, a former town
- Bruce, Mississippi, a town
- Bruce, South Dakota, a city
- Bruce, West Virginia, an unincorporated community
- Bruce, Wisconsin, a village
- Bruce Creek (disambiguation)
- Bruce Township (disambiguation)

=== Elsewhere ===
- Bruce (crater), on the Moon
- Bruce Island (Antarctica), an island in the Gerlache Strait, Antarctica
- Bruce Island (Franz Josef Land), an island in Franz Josef Land, Russia
- Bruce Island (Nunavut), a Baffin Island offshore island located in the Arctic Archipelago in the territory of Nunavut

== Arts and entertainment ==
- "Bruce" (song), by Rick Springfield, 1984
- The Brus, also known as The Bruce, a 14th-century narrative poem by John Barbour
- The Bruce (film), a 1996 film about Robert the Bruce
- Bruce!!!, a 2017 American comedy film
- Bruce, the nickname given to the shark in Jaws
- Bruce, a great white shark character in Finding Nemo
- Bruce the Moose, a character in the television series Degrassi: The Next Generation

== Maritime ==
- HMS Bruce (D81), a Royal Navy destroyer commissioned in 1918
- current name of RNAS Crail (HMS Jackdaw)
- USS Bruce (DD-329), a US Navy destroyer
- Bruce (ship), a 19th-century British sailing ship
- Bruce (anchor), a type of anchor

== Other uses ==
- Baron Bruce (disambiguation), four subsidiary titles
- Bruce baronets, two titles each in the Baronetage of the United Kingdom and the Baronetage of Nova Scotia
- Bruce Medal, awarded annually by the Astronomical Society of the Pacific for lifetime contributions to astronomy
- Bruce meteorite, the largest fragment of the Cranbourne meteorite, found in Australia
- Bruce Nuclear Generating Station, on the shore of Lake Huron, Ontario, Canada
- Bruce Publishing Company, an American Catholic publisher acquired by Benziger

== See also ==
- Bruce Castle, a Grade I listed 16th-century[1] manor house in Tottenham, London
- Bruce House (disambiguation)
- Bruce protocol, a diagnostic test used in the evaluation of cardiac function
- Bruces sketch, a comedy sketch in the television show Monty Python's Flying Circus
