= List of places in Florida: B =

This list of current cities, towns, unincorporated communities, counties, and other recognized places in the U.S. state of Florida also includes information on the number and names of counties in which the place lies, and its lower and upper zip code bounds, if applicable.

Name of place	Number of counties	Counties	Lower zip code	Upper zip code
Babcock	1	Charlotte		
Babson Park	1	Polk	33827	
Bagdad	1	Santa Rosa	32530	
Bagdad Junction	1	Santa Rosa		
Bahama Beach	1	Bay	32401	
Bahia Beach	1	Hillsborough	33570	
Bahia-mar	1	Broward	33316	
Bahoma	1	Washington	32428	
Bailey	1	Madison		
Baird	1	Polk		
Bairs Den	1	Highlands		
Baker	1	Bay	32401	
Baker	1	Lee		
Baker	1	Okaloosa	32531	
Baker Settlement	1	Holmes	32464	
Bakers Mill	1	Hamilton	32052	
Bakerstown	1	Volusia		
Bakersville	1	St. Johns	32084	
Bald Point	1	Franklin		
Baldwin	1	Duval	32234	
Bal Harbour	1	Miami-Dade	33154	
Ballantine Manor	1	Manatee	33580	
Ballard	1	Lee		
Ballard Pines	1	Brevard		
Ballast Point	1	Hillsborough	33611	
BallenIsles	1	Palm Beach		
Ballentine Manor	2	Manatee, Sarasota		
Balm	1	Hillsborough	33503	
Bamboo	1	Sumter	32748	
Banana	1	Putnam		
Barber Quarters	1	Okeechobee		
Barberville	1	Volusia	32105	
Bar Dee Homes	1	Pinellas	33540	
Bardin	1	Putnam	32077	
Bardmoor	1	Pinellas		
Bare Beach	1	Palm Beach	33440	
Barefoot Bay	1	Brevard	32976	
Barker Store	1	Holmes		
Bar Mine	1	Citrus		
Barrineau Park	1	Escambia	32533	
Barry College	1	Miami-Dade	33161	
Barth	1	Escambia	32533	
Bartow	1	Polk	33830	
Bartram Springs	2	Duval, St. Johns		
Barwal	1	Broward	33441	
Bascom	1	Jackson	32423	
Basinger	1	Okeechobee	34972	
Baskin	1	Pinellas	33540	
Bass	1	Columbia		
Bassville Park	1	Lake	32748	
Basswood Estates	1	Okeechobee		
Battle Ground Forks	1	Walton		
Baum	1	Leon		
Baxter	1	Baker		
Bay Acres	1	Sarasota	33559	
Bayard	1	Duval	32224	
Baychem	1	Santa Rosa	32570	
Bay City	1	Franklin	32320	
Bay Crest	1	Hillsborough		
Bay Crest Park	1	Hillsborough		
Bay Harbor	1	Bay	32401	
Bay Harbor	1	Broward		
Bay Harbor Islands	1	Miami-Dade	33154	
Bayhead	1	Bay	32466	
Bay Head	1	Pasco	32525	
Bay Heights	1	Miami-Dade		
Bay Hill	1	Orange		
Bay Hill	1	Sumter	33513	
Bay Lake	1	Lake	32736	
Bay Lake	1	Marion	32627	
Bay Lake	1	Orange	32802	
Bayonet Point	1	Pasco	34667	
Bayou George	1	Bay	32401	
Bay Pines	1	Pinellas	33504	
Bay Point	1	Monroe		
Bayport	1	Hernando	33512	
Bay Ridge	1	Orange	32703	
Bayshore	1	Lee	33903	
Bayshore	1	Miami-Dade		
Bay Shore Estates	1	Sarasota	33595	
Bayshore Gardens	1	Manatee	34207	
Bayshore Manor	1	Lee	33903	
Bayshore Park	1	Charlotte	33950	
Bay Springs	1	Escambia	32533	
Bayview	1	Bay	32401	
Bayview	1	Pinellas		
Bay Vista	1	Miami-Dade	33181	
Bay Vista	1	Pinellas	33712	
Baywood	1	Putnam	32635	
Beach	1	Indian River	32961	
Beach	1	St. Lucie	33450	
Beach Haven	1	Escambia		
Beachville	1	Suwannee		
Beachway	1	Manatee	33529	
Beachwood	1	Duval	32250	
Beacon Beach	1	Bay		
Beacon Hill	1	Gulf	32456	
Beacon Hills	1	Duval		
Beacon Lakes	1	Pasco		
Beacon Light	1	Broward	33064	
Beacon Square	1	Pasco	33589	
Beacon Squier	1	Pasco	33589	
Bealsville	1	Hillsborough	33566	
Bean City	1	Palm Beach	33459	
Bear Creek	1	Bay	32401	
Bear Creek	1	Pinellas		
Bear Head	1	Walton	32433	
Bear Hollow	1	Highlands		
Bear Lake	1	Seminole	32703	
Bearss Plaza	1	Hillsborough	33612	
Beattys Corner	1	Hillsborough		
Beauclerc	1	Duval	32217	
Beauclerc Gardens	1	Duval		
Beauclere Manor	1	Duval	32217	
Beaver Creek	1	Okaloosa	32531	
Becker	1	Nassau	32097	
Beck Hammock	1	Seminole		
Beckhamtown	1	Alachua		
Beechwood	1	Duval	32250	
Beeghly Heights	1	Duval	32218	
Bee Ridge	1	Sarasota	33578	
Beetree Ford	1	Levy		
Belair	1	Leon		
Bel-Air	1	Seminole	32771	
Belandville	1	Santa Rosa		
Bell	1	Gilchrist	32619	
Bellair	1	Clay	32073	
Bellair-Meadowbrook Terrace	1	Clay		
Bellair West	1	Clay	32073	
Belleair	1	Pinellas	34616	
Belleair Beach	1	Pinellas	34635	
Belleair Bluffs	1	Pinellas	34640	
Belleair Shore	1	Pinellas	34635	
Belle Ayre Estates	1	Lake	32757	
Belle Glade	1	Palm Beach	33430	
Belle Glade Camp	1	Palm Beach	33430	
Belle Haven	1	Pinellas	33515	
Belle Isle	1	Orange	32809	
Belle Meade	1	Collier		
Belleview	1	Escambia	32506	
Belleview	1	Marion	34420	
Belleview Heights	1	Marion	32620	
Belleville	1	Hamilton	31636	
Belle Vista Beach	1	Pinellas		
Bells Mill	1	Washington		
Bellview	1	Escambia	32526	
Bellville	1	Hamilton		
Bellwood	1	Brevard	32780	
Bellwood Estates	1	Leon		
Bel Marra	1	Palm Beach		
Belmont	1	Pinellas	33516	
Belmore	1	Clay		
Belspur	1	Sarasota		
Belvedere	1	Palm Beach	33405	
Belvedere Homes	1	Palm Beach	33401	
Benbow	1	Glades	33440	
Bennett	1	Bay	32466	
Ben's Lake	1	Okaloosa	32542	
Benson Junction	1	Volusia	32713	
Benton	1	Columbia		
Benton Hills	1	Leon		
Bent Tree	1	Sarasota		
Bereah	1	Polk	33841	
Beresford	1	Volusia	32720	
Beresford Manor	1	Volusia	32720	
Berkeley	1	Hernando	33512	
Bermont	1	Charlotte		
Berry	1	Polk		
Berrydale	1	Santa Rosa	32565	
Bertha	1	Seminole		
Bessemer	1	Martin		
Bessent	1	Baker		
Bethany	1	Manatee	33551	
Bethel	1	Wakulla	32301	
Bethlehem	1	Holmes	32425	
Bethune Beach	1	Volusia	32069	
Betts	1	Bay		
Betty Lou Beach	1	Bay	32401	
Beulah	1	Escambia	32526	
Beulah	1	Orange	32787	
Bevens	1	Citrus		
Beverley Beach	1	Broward		
Beverley Terrace	1	Sarasota	33577	
Beverly	1	Franklin		
Beverly Beach	1	Flagler	32036	
Beverly Hills	1	Citrus	32665	
Beverly Hills	1	Duval	34465	
Beverly Terrace	1	Sarasota	33577	
Beville Heights	1	Alachua		
Bevilles Corner	1	Sumter	33513	
Bibtown	1	Polk		
Bid-A-Wee	1	Bay	32401	
Big Bayou	1	Pinellas	33705	
Big Bend	1	Hillsborough		
Big Bend Farm	1	Leon	32311	
Big Coppitt Key	1	Monroe	33040	
Big Cypress	1	Collier	33440	
Big Cypress Indian Reservation	2	Broward, Hendry	33024	
Big Cypress National Preserve	3	Collier, Miami-Dade, Monroe	33939	
Biggar	1	Lee		
Big Pine Key	1	Monroe	33043	
Big Torch Key	1	Monroe		
Biltmore	1	Duval	32205	
Biltmore Beach	1	Bay	32401	
Bimini	1	Flagler		
Birch Ocean Front	1	Broward		
Biscayne	1	Miami-Dade		
Biscayne Facility	1	Miami-Dade	33152	
Biscayne Gardens	1	Miami-Dade	33168	
Biscayne National Park	1	Miami-Dade	33030	
Biscayne One	1	Miami-Dade	33131	
Biscayne Park	1	Miami-Dade	33161	
Biscayne Village	1	Duval		
Bithlo	1	Orange	32820	
Black Acres	1	Alachua	32601	
Black Creek	1	Leon		
Black Diamond	1	Citrus		
Black Hammock	1	Seminole		
Blackman	1	Okaloosa	32531	
Black Point	1	Flagler		
Blacks Ford	1	St. Johns		
Blacks Still	1	Hamilton		
Blake	1	Volusia		
Bland	1	Alachua	32615	
Blanton	1	Pasco	33525	
Blichton	1	Marion	32670	
Blitchton	1	Marion		
Blocker	1	Leon		
Bloody Bluff	1	Franklin	32335	
Bloomingdale	1	Hillsborough	33594	
Blount Island	1	Duval		
Blountstown	1	Calhoun	32424	
Blowing Rocks	1	Martin		
Bloxham	1	Leon	32304	
Bloxham Heights	1	Leon		
Blue Cypress Village	1	Indian River		
Bluefield	1	Martin		
Blue Gulf Beach	1	Walton		
Blue Inlet	1	Palm Beach	33432	
Blue Lake	1	Volusia	32720	
Blue Lakes Ridge	1	Lake	32767	
Blue Mountain Beach	1	Walton	32454	
Blue Springs	1	Hamilton		
Blue Springs	1	Lake	32797	
Blue Springs	1	Volusia	32763	
Blue Springs Landing	1	Volusia		
Bluff Springs	1	Escambia	32535	
Bluffton	1	Volusia		
Boardman	1	Marion	32633	
Boca Chica Key	1	Monroe		
Boca Chica Station	1	Monroe		
Boca Ciega	1	Pinellas		
Boca Del Mar	1	Palm Beach		
Boca Grande	1	Lee	33921	
Boca Harbour	1	Palm Beach	33432	
Boca Lago	1	Palm Beach		
Boca Pointe	1	Palm Beach		
Boca Raton	1	Palm Beach	33427	34
Boca West	1	Palm Beach	33432	
Boden	1	Volusia		
Bogia	1	Escambia	32568	
Bohemia	1	Escambia		
Bokeelia	1	Lee	33922	
Bon Ami	1	Liberty		
Bonaventure	1	Brevard		
Bond	1	Leon		
Bonifay	1	Holmes	32425	
Bonita Beach	1	Lee	33923	
Bonita Shores	2	Collier, Lee	33923	
Bonita Springs	1	Lee	33923	
Bonnie	1	Polk		
Bonnie Loch	1	Broward		
Bonnie Loch-Woodsetter North	1	Broward		
Bon Terra	1	Flagler		
Bookertown	1	Seminole	32771	
Bostwick	1	Putnam	32007	
Botts	1	Santa Rosa	32570	
Boulevard	1	Hillsborough		
Boulevard	1	Pinellas	33515	
Boulevard Gardens	1	Broward		
Boulevard Heights	1	Broward		
Boulogne	1	Nassau	32046	
Bovine	1	Brevard		
Bowden	1	Duval	32216	
Bowling Green	1	Hardee	33834	
Boyd	1	Taylor	32345	
Boyette	1	Hillsborough		
Boykin	1	Jackson		
Boynton Beach	1	Palm Beach	33425	
Boys Ranch	1	Suwannee	32060	
Braden Castle	1	Manatee	33505	
Bradenton	1	Manatee	34201	82
Bradenton Beach	1	Manatee	34217	
Bradenton South	1	Manatee	33505	
Bradford	1	Washington	32428	
Bradford Manor	1	Leon		
Bradfordville	1	Leon	32312	
Bradley	1	Polk	33835	
Bradley Junction	1	Polk		
Branchborough	1	Pasco		
Branchton	1	Hillsborough		
Branchville	1	Gadsden		
Brandon	1	Hillsborough	33510/33511	
Branford	1	Suwannee	32008	
Brannonville	1	Bay	32401	
Braswells	1	Jefferson	32344	
Bratt	1	Escambia	32535	
Breezeswept Park Estates	1	Broward	33314	
Brent	1	Escambia	32503	
Brentwood	1	Broward		
Brentwood	1	Duval	32208	
Brentwood	1	Escambia		
Brentwood Estates	1	Broward	33307	
Bretton Hills	1	Leon		
Brewster	1	Polk		
Brickell	1	Miami-Dade	33131	
Brickell Hammock	1	Miami-Dade		
Brickton	1	Escambia		
Brickyard	1	Franklin		
Bridgeport	1	Pinellas		
Bridgeport	1	Putnam		
Bridges	1	Hardee		
Bridle Path Acres	1	Leon		
Bright	1	Miami-Dade	33013	
Brighton	1	Highlands	33472	
Brighton Indian Reservation	1	Glades	33024	
Briny Breezes	1	Palm Beach	33435	
Bristol	1	Liberty	32321	
Broad Branch	1	Calhoun		
Broadview Country Club Estates	1	Broward	33313	
Broadview Park	1	Broward	33314	
Broadview-Pompano Park	1	Broward		
Broadway	1	Hillsborough	33605	
Brock Crossroad	1	Washington		
Broco	1	Hernando		
Bronson	1	Levy	32621	
Brooker	1	Bradford	32622	
Brooker Creek	1	Pinellas	33563	
Brooklyn	1	Duval	32204	
Brookridge	1	Hernando		
Brookside	1	Indian River		
Brooksville	1	Hernando	34601	
Brookview	1	Duval		
Browardale	1	Broward	33311	
Broward Estates	1	Broward		
Broward Gardens	1	Broward		
Broward Highlands	1	Broward	33441	
Brownsdale	1	Santa Rosa	32565	
Browns Farm	1	Palm Beach		
Browns Still	1	Union	32054	
Browns Village	1	Miami-Dade		
Brownsville	1	Escambia	32505	
Brownsville	1	Miami-Dade	33142	
Browntown	1	Jackson	32440	
Brownville	1	DeSoto	33821	
Broxson	1	Santa Rosa		
Bruce	1	Walton	32455	
Bruceville	1	Marion		
Brunco	1	Dixie		
Bryant	1	Palm Beach	33439	
Bryceville	1	Nassau	32009	
Brynwood	1	Lee	33901	
Buccaneer Estates	1	Miami-Dade	33054	
Bucell Junction	1	Taylor		
Buchanan	1	Hardee	33890	
Buckhead Ridge	1	Glades		
Buckhorn	1	Wakulla	32358	
Buckingham	1	Lee	33905	
Buckingham West	1	Alachua		
Buck Siding	1	Franklin		
Buckville	1	Lafayette		
Buda	1	Alachua		
Buenaventura Lakes	1	Osceola	34743	
Buena Vista	1	Miami-Dade	33137	
Buena Vista	1	Pasco	33589	
Buena Vista Trailer City	1	Pasco		
Buffalo Bluff	1	Putnam		
Bull Creek	1	Osceola		
Bunche Park	1	Miami-Dade	33054	
Bunker	1	DeSoto	33821	
Bunker Hill	1	Collier		
Bunnell	1	Flagler	32110	
Burbank	1	Marion	32637	
Burnetts Lake	1	Alachua		
Burnt Store Marina	1	Lee		
Bushnell	1	Sumter	33513	
Butler Beach	1	St. Johns		
Byrd	1	St. Johns		
Byrneville	1	Escambia	32535	
Byrnville	1	Escambia	32535	

== See also ==
- Florida
- List of municipalities in Florida
- List of former municipalities in Florida
- List of counties in Florida
- List of census-designated places in Florida
