= Spring Creek, Tennessee =

Spring Creek, Tennessee may refer to the following places in Tennessee:

- Spring Creek, Henry County, Tennessee, an unincorporated community
- Spring Creek, Lawrence County, Tennessee, an unincorporated community
- Spring Creek, Madison County, Tennessee, an unincorporated community
- Spring Creek, McMinn County, Tennessee, an unincorporated community
- Spring Creek, Perry County, Tennessee, an unincorporated community
- Spring Creek, Warren County, Tennessee, an unincorporated community
- Spring Creek, Wilson County, Tennessee, a ghost town
