= John L. Hagler House =

- U.S. National Register of Historic Places
- Location within Tennessee Location within the United States
- Location: Poplar Grove Road, near Springville, Henry County, Tennessee
- Coordinates: 36°15′42″N 88°09′43″W
- Built: 1820
- Architect: John L. Hagler
- NRHP reference No.: 80003836
- Added to NRHP: March 13, 1980

The John L. Hagler House is a historic home located on Poplar Grove Road between intersections with Highway 69A and Whitney Branch Road, near Springville, Henry County, Tennessee.

It was built in 1820 by John L. Hagler and added to the National Register in 1980.
