= Bruce Township, Michigan =

Bruce Township is the name of two places in the U.S. state of Michigan:

- Bruce Township, Chippewa County, Michigan
- Bruce Township, Macomb County, Michigan

== See also ==
- Bruce Township (disambiguation)
