= Bruce House =

Bruce House may refer to:

- Blanche K. Bruce House, a historic house in Washington, D.C.
- Bruce House, London, a residential building in London
- Donald Bruce House, a historic plantation in South Carolina
- H. L. Bruce House, a historic house in Tennessee
