= Puryear, Tennessee =

- City
- Location in Henry County, Tennessee
- Coordinates: 36°26′41″N 88°20′2″W
- Country: United States
- State: Tennessee
- County: Henry

Area
  - Total: 0.95 sq mi (2.45 km^{2})
  - Land: 0.95 sq mi (2.45 km^{2})
  - Water: 0 sq mi (0.00 km^{2})
- Elevation: 607 ft (185 m)

Population (2020)
  - Total: 706
  - Density: 745.6/sq mi (287.86/km^{2})
- Time zone: UTC-6 (Central (CST))
  - Summer (DST): UTC-5 (CDT)
- ZIP code: 38251
- Area code: 731
- FIPS code: 47-61160
- GNIS feature ID: 1298712

Puryear is a city in Henry County, Tennessee, United States. As of the 2020 census, Puryear had a population of 706.

== History ==
Puryear was originally named Littleton in honor of James T. Littleton, a farmer and Confederate States Army veteran who donated a portion of his land to the Paducah, Tennessee and Alabama Railroad to use as a right of way. Its name was changed to Puryear at the suggestion of Littleton's son, James Graves Littleton, when the Nashville, Chattanooga and St. Louis Railway took control of the railroad and mandated it be changed so as not to conflict with the name of either a town in Georgia or Littleton, North Carolina.

== Geography ==
Puryear is located in northern Henry County at 36°26′41″N 88°20′2″W (36.444853, -88.333770). U.S. Route 641 passes through the east side of the city, leading north 4 miles (6 km) to Hazel, Kentucky, and south 10 miles (16 km) to Paris, the Henry county seat. Tennessee State Route 140 passes through the center of Puryear, leading east 12 miles (19 km) to U.S. Route 79 near Paris Landing State Park on Kentucky Lake, and west 8 miles (13 km) to SR 69 near Jones Mill.

According to the United States Census Bureau, Puryear has a total area of 0.93 square miles (2.4 km^{2}), all land. The Tennessee Valley Divide runs along the western edge of the city; most of Puryear drains north via the East Fork of the Clarks River, eventually reaching the Tennessee River just south of its confluence with the Ohio River, while the westernmost part of Puryear drains west via Clear Creek to the North Fork of the Obion River, a tributary of the Mississippi.

== Demographics ==
Historical population
Census	Pop.	Note	%±
1910	254		—
1920	325		28.0%
1930	351		8.0%
1940	368		4.8%
1950	430		16.8%
1960	408		−5.1%
1970	458		12.3%
1980	624		36.2%
1990	592		−5.1%
2000	667		12.7%
2010	671		0.6%
2020	706		5.2%

=== 2020 census ===
As of the 2020 census, Puryear had a population of 706. The median age was 45.0 years. 20.0% of residents were under the age of 18 and 22.8% of residents were 65 years of age or older. For every 100 females there were 94.0 males, and for every 100 females age 18 and over there were 90.9 males age 18 and over.

0.0% of residents lived in urban areas, while 100.0% lived in rural areas.

There were 287 households in Puryear, of which 34.1% had children under the age of 18 living in them. Of all households, 42.2% were married-couple households, 20.6% were households with a male householder and no spouse or partner present, and 28.6% were households with a female householder and no spouse or partner present. About 27.9% of all households were made up of individuals and 11.9% had someone living alone who was 65 years of age or older.

There were 310 housing units, of which 7.4% were vacant. The homeowner vacancy rate was 1.9% and the rental vacancy rate was 11.3%.

Racial composition as of the 2020 census
Race	Number	Percent
White	636	90.1%
Black or African American	30	4.2%
American Indian and Alaska Native	0	0.0%
Asian	0	0.0%
Native Hawaiian and Other Pacific Islander	0	0.0%
Some other race	5	0.7%
Two or more races	35	5.0%
Hispanic or Latino (of any race)	20	2.8%

=== 2000 census ===
As of the 2000 census, there was a population of 667, with 284 households and 191 families residing in the city. The population density was 730.0 inhabitants per square mile (281.9/km^{2}). There were 328 housing units at an average density of 359.0 per square mile (138.6/km^{2}). The racial makeup of the city was 95.65% White, 2.70% African American, 0.15% Native American, 0.45% Asian, 0.45% from other races, and 0.60% from two or more races. Hispanic or Latino of any race were 0.75% of the population.

There were 284 households, out of which 26.8% had children under the age of 18 living with them, 53.9% were married couples living together, 9.5% had a female householder with no husband present, and 32.7% were non-families. 27.5% of all households were made up of individuals, and 14.1% had someone living alone who was 65 years of age or older. The average household size was 2.27 and the average family size was 2.73.

In the city, the population was spread out, with 19.8% under the age of 18, 8.7% from 18 to 24, 26.8% from 25 to 44, 22.9% from 45 to 64, and 21.7% who were 65 years of age or older. The median age was 41 years. For every 100 females there were 92.2 males. For every 100 females age 18 and over, there were 91.1 males.

The median income for a household in the city was $28,750, and the median income for a family was $36,042. Males had a median income of $22,315 versus $20,481 for females. The per capita income for the city was $17,131. About 7.4% of families and 10.8% of the population were below the poverty line, including 24.3% of those under age 18 and 9.3% of those age 65 or over.
