= Tennessee State Route 217 =

Highway in Tennessee

State Route 217
- SR 217 highlighted in red

Route information
- Maintained by TDOT
- Length: 2.9 mi (4.7 km)
- Existed: July 1, 1983–present

Major junctions
- South end: SR 22 in Dresden
- SR 54 in Dresden
- North end: SR 89 near Dresden

Location
- Country: United States
- State: Tennessee
- Counties: Weakley

Highway system
- Tennessee State Routes; Interstate; US; State
← SR 216	→ SR 218

State Route 217 (SR 217) is a 2.9-mile-long (4.7 km) north–south state highway that lies along the eastern edge of the Dresden city limits in Weakley County, Tennessee.

== Route description ==
SR 217 begins as County Maintenance Road in Dresden at an intersection with SR 22, directly beside Dresden High School. It heads north to leave Dresden and pass through wooded areas to come to an intersection and have a short concurrency with SR 54, where SR 217 very briefly renters the Dresden city limits. The highway then heads north through farmland along Klutts Road to come to an end at an intersection with SR 89. The entire route of SR 217 is a two-lane highway.

== Major intersections ==
The entire route is in Weakley County.

Location	mi	km	Destinations	Notes
Dresden	0.0	0.0	SR 22 – Gleason, Dresden, Martin	Southern terminus
	1.5	2.4	SR 54 east (Paris Highway) – Como, Paris	Southern end of SR 54 concurrency
Dresden	1.9	3.1	SR 54 west (E Main Street) – Dresden	Northern end of SR 54 concurrency
	2.9	4.7	SR 89 (Palmersville Highway) – Dresden, Palmersville	Northern terminus
1.000 mi = 1.609 km; 1.000 km = 0.621 mi: Concurrency terminus
