= William Riley (architect) =

English architect and engineer

William Edward Riley (1852 – 9 November 1937) was a British architect. He worked for twenty-two years in the British Admiralty Works Department from 1877 until 1899 when he had reached the rank of assistant director. He was appointed chief architect to the London County Council in 1899, where he served until 1919. He went into private practice with E. B. Glanfield until retiring in 1931.

== Early years ==
William Edward Riley was born in Yorkshire and educated at Batley Grammar School, with stays in France and Italy. He was articled with William Critchley in Wakefield in 1868. He was there five years, and moved to work with Beck and Lee of Finsbury. In 1877 he joined the staff of the Director of Engineering and Works of the Admiralty. He remained here until 1899, rising to the rank of assistant director. He was in charge of works in Chatham and Devonport, among other places, Bermuda, Malta.

== Architect to the London County Council and his department ==
In 1899, Thomas Blashill, originally from the Metropolitan Board of Works, retired from the post of chief architect to London County Council. Blashill had built the department from scratch, developing the Housing of the Working Classes Branch in response to the Housing of the Working Classes Act 1890. W. E. Riley was appointed as his successor, with the official title of Superintending Architect of Metropolitan Buildings and Architect to the London County Council. In 1906, he designed the lodging-house Bruce House on Drury Lane for the County Council.

There was a tension among the members and officers of the London County Council on whether the council's function was to enhance London as a world-class city, building monuments that befitted its role as the leading city in the world's greatest empire, or the utilitarian function of providing homes and services and buildings for the poor. The architect department had to provide a balance. The Housing of the Working Classes Branch had achieved some notable firsts: it had produced the Boundary Estate of architect-designed tenement blocks radiating from Arnold Circus—where previous tenements for charities such as the Peabody Trust followed a set plan no matter where they were located. All the blocks survive (except one) and all are now listed buildings as is the street plan and the central park. They also produced Totterdown Fields estate—as the first and model cottage garden estate—and it was Riley who signed off the plans. There was considerable criticism that London County Council architect were doing work that should rightfully be done by the private sector. A RIBA enquiry was set up in 1915 and Riley suggested that the profession was "overloaded by a sub-stratum of incompetent private members who could not obtain employment". He continued, "The routine through which an official must press his work is of such a character that feeble results ... cannot ensue. If outsiders had to encounter the same searching criticism and a tithe of the obstruction, their fees would only about half cover their requirements."

=== County Hall ===
Land was obtained to build a prestigious County Hall in 1905, and the "General Section" of the LCC Architects, under Percy Ginham (1865–1947) were required to draw up general specification of what would be required and to demonstrate to members the potential of the site. This they did; Ginham drew up the indicative floor plans, and Riley drew up an elevation for the proposed building. These were displayed to members at the full council meeting on 11 April 1905. Riley believed that County Hall should be designed by architects from his department. His plan was widely publicised and drew immediate criticism from a strong external lobby of RIBA members, who tended to view public architects as incompetent technicians, undercutting independent architects' fees at the taxpayers' expense. They knew that Riley worked with Norman Shaw's and they knew too that Shaw disliked competitions, and the RIBA itself. As Riley foresaw, they all wanted a chance at one of the decade's big commissions. (Note: The subject of competitions was a source of much concern to RIBA, particularly following the peculiar outcome of the 1903 Liverpool Cathedral competition which was won by the 24-year-old Giles Gilbert Scott. He had been forced to accept G. F. Bodley (1827–1907), a competition assessor, as joint architect. This did not work well. In consequence RIBA formed a committee to establish approved guidelines for the setting up and running of competitions. These regulations were approved by the institute in the summer of 1905.)

RIBA proposed a competition to LCC in April 1906, complete with a complex set of regulations on who should determine the winner. Riley opposed the concept but counter-proposed that, if a competition was to take place he and Shaw should be the assessors and the winner should work with his department on matters of internal economy and detail using Liverpool Cathedral as a precedent. His department was responsible for drawing up the 50-page book of conditions. This plan was adopted by council on 24 July 1906, and the regulations by the Establishment Committee, a week later.

The designs were to be by 27 August 1907: Riley had the dual role of assessor and joint architect, his employee Gingham drew up the detailed specification, and he had published indicative plans which were included in the book of conditions. There were 152 competitors, who submitted 99 designs on 1199 sheets of paper. Before the judgement was made there were municipal elections and the supportive Progressives lost to the Municipal Reform conservative group who campaigned for austerity. Though they failed to cancel the County Hall project, they were looking for a cheaper options. The winner in 1906 was Ralph Knott (1878–1929), a 29-year-old assistant in Aston Webb's office who had little experience of completing a building. The design was pared back, and was said to be "cold, grim and soulless". Riley maintained control throughout but found the process distressing.

== Personal life ==
Riley was an accomplished artist and served on the council of the Royal British Colonial Society of Artists, being elected in 1922 as the representative of Royal Institute of British Architects. He was a member of the Royal Society of Artists, and was said to spend most of his spare time painting. Riley died on 9 November 1937 in Blackheath.
