= Mr. Bruce =

Mr. Bruce may refer to:

- The stage name of Ian Bruce (painter), English painter and musical artist
- Mr. Bruce, bassist for Russian hip-hop and rap group Bad Balance
- Bruce (surname)

== See also ==
- Bruce (disambiguation)
