= North Poplar Historic District =

Historic district in Tennessee, United States

- U.S. National Register of Historic Places
- U.S. Historic district
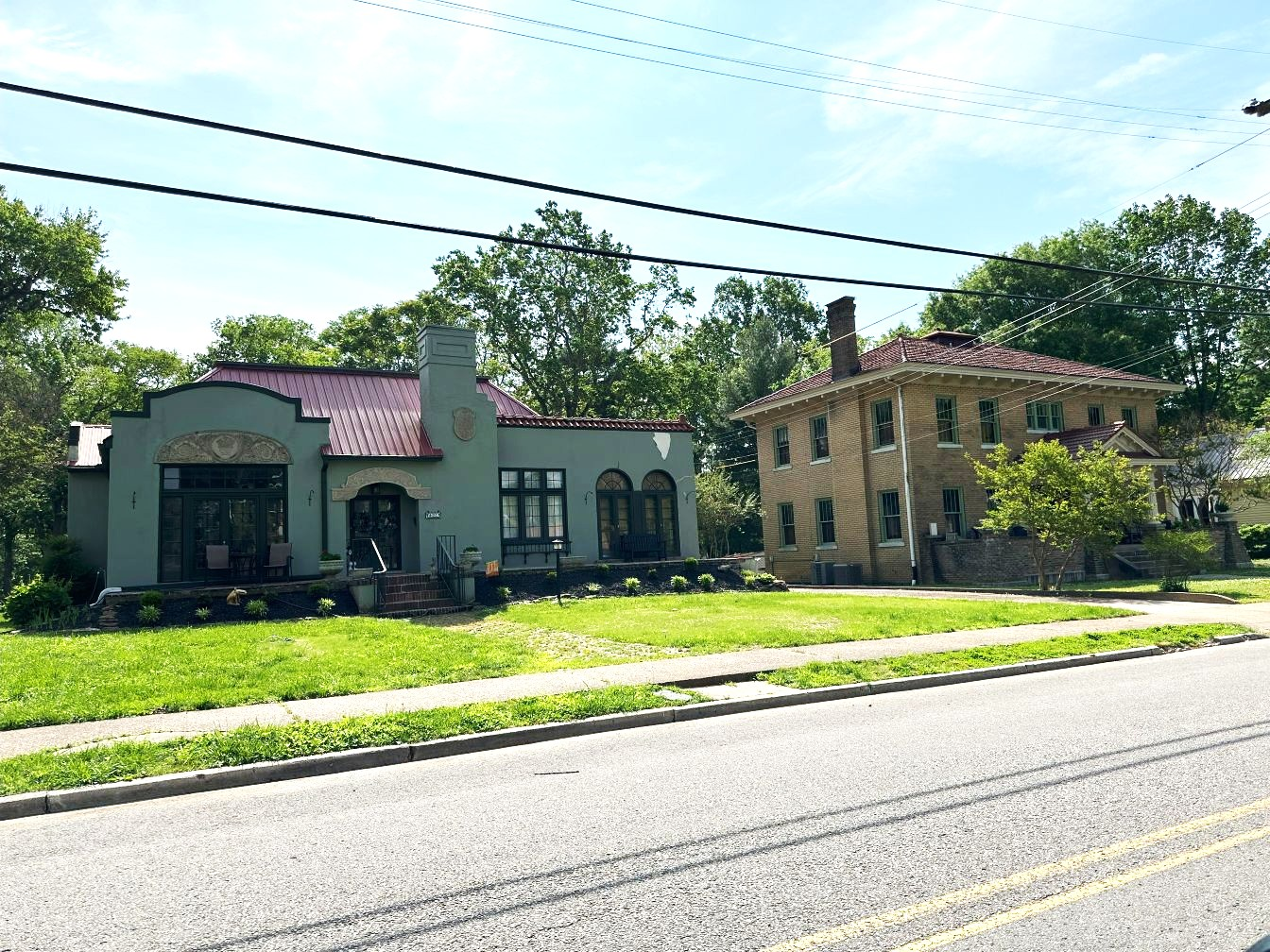

- Location within Tennessee Location within the United States
- Location: Along sections of North Poplar and East Church Streets, Paris, Henry County, Tennessee
- Coordinates: 36°18′25″N 88°19′30″W
- Architect: Barton & Lasater
- NRHP reference No.: 88001428
- Added to NRHP: September 7, 1988

The North Poplar Historic District is a historic district in Paris, Henry County, Tennessee, United States. It was added to the National Register of Historic Places in 1988.

There are 60 historic buildings in the district, dating from the 1870s to the 1940s and representing some of West Tennessee's best residential architecture of the late 19th and early 20th centuries. Architectural styles include Italian Renaissance, Bungalow, Craftsman, Neoclassical and Colonial Revival.

The district includes Cavitt Place, a two-story Italian Renaissance-style mansion built in 1916. It now houses the Paris-Henry County Heritage Center. Original features of the building that are still intact include painted-glass windows, a marble staircase and floors, murals on ceilings and walls, and mahogany woodwork. The Heritage Center operates as a small museum featuring a permanent exhibit on Henry County history, as well as temporary exhibits and resources for historical research.
