= Barrs Chapel C.M.E. Church =

Historic church in Tennessee, United States

- U.S. National Register of Historic Places
- U.S. Historic district
- Location within Tennessee Location within the United States
- Location: 5560 Briarpatch Lake Rd., Midway, Tennessee
- Coordinates: 36°18′19″N 88°29′11″W
- Area: 3.9 acres (1.6 ha)
- Architect: Cowan, Dolph; et al.
- Architectural style: Gable-front
- NRHP reference No.: 05001335
- Added to NRHP: November 25, 2005

Barrs Chapel C.M.E. Church is a historic district at 5560 Briarpatch Lake Road in the Midway community of Henry County, Tennessee.

Contributing properties in the historic district include the Barrs Chapel Church building, constructed in 1953; Barrs Chapel School, built in 1906; and Barrs Chapel Church Cemetery, which dates to around 1870. The historic district was listed on the National Register of Historic Places in 2005.
