= Mansfield, Tennessee =

- Unincorporated community
- Location within Tennessee Location within the United States
- Coordinates: 36°10′38″N 88°17′10″W
- Country: United States
- State: Tennessee
- County: Henry

Area
  - Total: 36.52 sq mi (94.6 km^{2})
  - Land: 36.52 sq mi (94.6 km^{2})
  - Water: 0 sq mi (0 km^{2})
- Elevation: 459 ft (140 m)

Population (2012)
  - Total: 766
  - Density: 20/sq mi (7.7/km^{2})
- Time zone: UTC-6 (Central (CST))
  - Summer (DST): UTC-5 (CDT)
- ZIP code: 38236
- Area code: 731
- GNIS feature ID: 1292594

Mansfield is an unincorporated community in Henry County, Tennessee, United States. Its ZIP code is 38236.
