= Nobles, Tennessee =

- Unincorporated community
- Location within Tennessee Location within the United States
- Coordinates: 36°21′19″N 88°13′11″W
- Country: United States
- State: Tennessee
- County: Henry
- Elevation: 443 ft (135 m)
- Time zone: UTC-6 (Central (CST))
  - Summer (DST): UTC-5 (CDT)
- Area code: 731
- GNIS feature ID: 1295794

Nobles is an unincorporated community in Henry County, Tennessee, United States.
