= Bruce Creek =

Bruce Creek may refer to:

- Bruce Creek (Addition Creek tributary), a stream in Montana
- Bruce Creek (Washington), a stream in Washington state
