= Porter House (Paris, Tennessee) =

Historic house in Tennessee, United States

- U.S. National Register of Historic Places
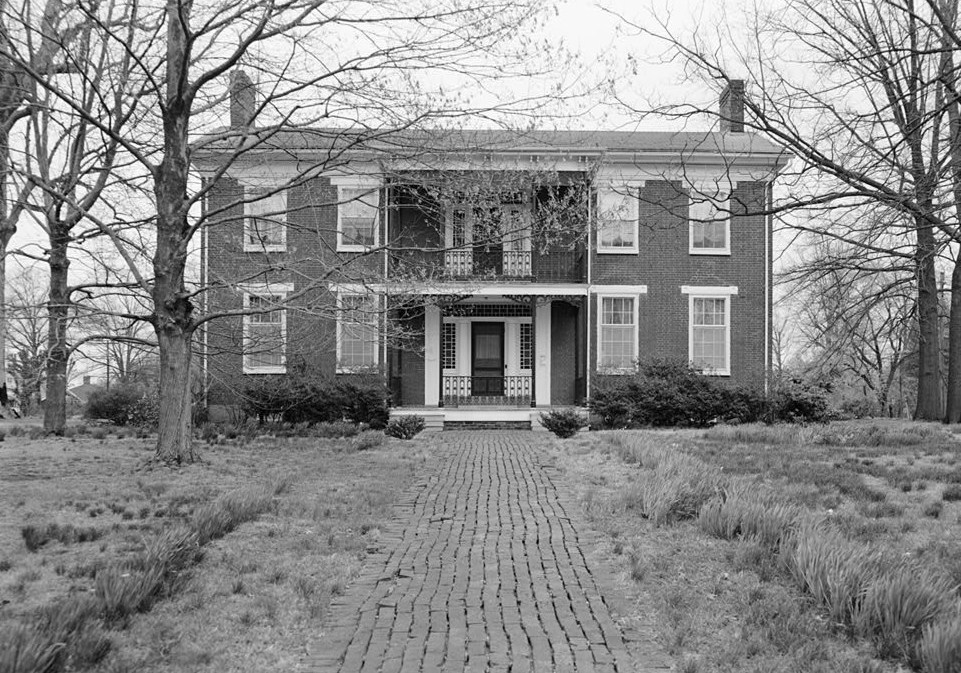

- Location within Tennessee Location within the United States
- Location: 407 South Dunlap Street, Paris, Henry County, Tennessee
- Coordinates: 36°17′56″N 88°19′23″W
- Built: About 1850
- Architect: Not Known
- NRHP reference No.: 73001789
- Added to NRHP: April 11, 1973

The Porter House is a historic home located at 407 South Dunlap Street, Paris, Henry County, Tennessee.

It was built by Thomas Crawford about 1850 and added to the National Register in 1973. It is most notable for being the residence of Tennessee Governor James Davis Porter between 1887 and his death in 1912.

== History ==
Thomas Crawford, a wealthy mercantile in Paris, Tennessee, purchased 14 acres of land on June 6, 1848, from John B. DeWitt for $500. It is estimated that Crawford built the first part of the house on this land by 1850. At the age of twenty-six, he is recorded in the 1850 census as the second wealthiest man in Henry County, owning real estate valued at $15,500. His first two children were born in the house before he sold the property on September 27, 1855, to Mary G. Swayne for $6500.

Mary Swayne and her husband John owned the property until December 30, 1859, when it was sold to John H. Dunlap for $8500. John was a prominent Paris lawyer, landowner and the younger brother of Hugh W. Dunlap. The property was deeded to John's wife, Marietta Dunlap, on September 23, 1874. John Henry Dunlap died on December 24, 1874, and was buried at the Paris City Cemetery.

Marrietta Beauchamp Dunlap deeded the property to her son-in-law and former Tennessee Governor James Davis Porter on February 21, 1887. After the death of Governor Porter on May 18, 1912, his widow Susan Dunlap Porter sold the property to Joel Porter. It was deeded to his wife, Lona W. Porter on January 10, 1936, and then to Joel and Lona's daughters, Margaret Porter and Mrs. Julia Woolfork, on August 1, 1955.

The Historic American Buildings Survey states that the owner of the house was Miss Margaret Porter in Summer 1972. The survey goes on to describe a change in brick pattern and floor height differences as signs that the house was built in two stages. A service building is also located on the property. Its purpose was not ascertained in the Historic American Buildings Survey but was speculated as a kitchen, slave's quarters, or both.
