= Henry County Airport (Tennessee) =

- IATA: PHT; ICAO: KPHT; FAA LID: PHT

Summary
- Airport type: Public
- Owner: Henry County
- Serves: Paris, Tennessee
- Elevation AMSL: 580 ft (180 m)
- Coordinates: 36°20′18″N 088°22′58″W

Map
- Location of airport in Tennessee PHT (the United States)

Runways
| Direction | Length | | Surface |
| Direction | ft | m | Surface |
|---|---|---|---|
| 2/20 | 5,001 | 1,524 | Asphalt |

Statistics (2000)
- Aircraft operations: 16,445
- Source: Federal Aviation Administration

Henry County Airport (IATA: PHT, ICAO: KPHT, FAA LID: PHT) is a county-owned public-use airport located three miles (4.8 km) northwest of the central business district of Paris, a city in Henry County, Tennessee, United States.

The current Airport Manager is Mr. Bobby Nolan.

== Facilities and aircraft ==
Henry County Airport covers an area of 250 acres (100 ha) which contains one asphalt paved runway (2/20) measuring 5,001 ft × 100 ft (1,524 m × 30 m). For the 12-month period ending July 11, 2000, the airport had 16,445 aircraft operations, an average of 45 per day: 99.5% general aviation and 0.5% air taxi.

=== Civil Air Patrol ===
Henry County Airport has been home to the Henry County Composite Squadron of the Tennessee Wing Civil Air Patrol for over 25 years. Founded in December 1993 at the Tennessee Army National Guard armory in Paris, the squadron constructed its own facility on the far end of the airport in 1995, opposite the terminal, at the Grant Grissom Headquarters Building.

The building was dedicated in 2001 for Cadet Senior Airman Richard Grant Grissom, who was killed in a vehicular accident in Murray, Kentucky on September 10, 1999. The Squadron was 2001 Squadron of Merit, 2004 Squadron of Merit, and 2003 Tennessee Wing Squadron of the Year.

== See also ==
- List of airports in Tennessee
