= Charles M. White House =

- U.S. National Register of Historic Places
- Location within Tennessee Location within the United States
- Location: 403 Whitehall Circle, Paris, Henry County, Tennessee
- Coordinates: 36°17′38″N 88°19′03″W
- Built: 1910
- Architectural style: Classical Revival
- NRHP reference No.: 88001425
- Added to NRHP: September 7, 1988

The Charles M. White House is a historic home located at 403 Whitehall Circle, Paris, Henry County, Tennessee.

It was built in 1910 and added to the National Register in 1988.
