= Town 'n' Country, Florida =

Town 'n' Country
- Census-designated place
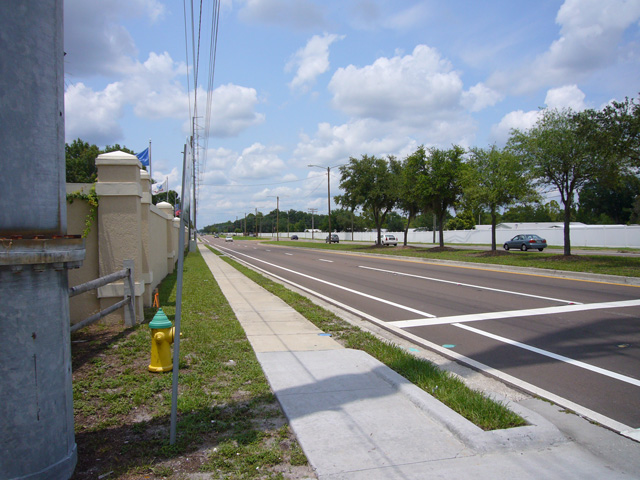
- Looking north on Sheldon Road

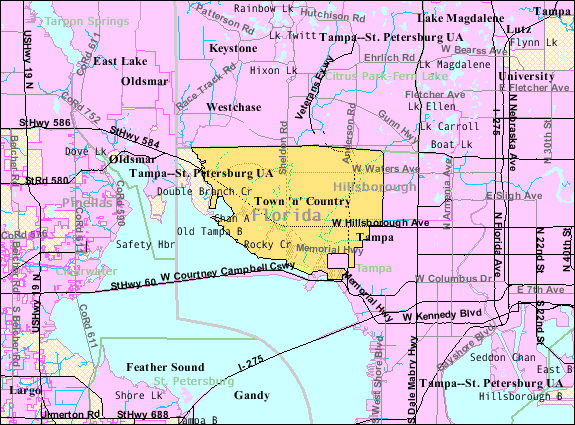

- Location in Hillsborough County and the state of Florida
- Coordinates: 28°00′38″N 82°35′52″W
- Country: United States
- State: Florida
- County: Hillsborough

Area
  - Total: 24.14 sq mi (62.52 km^{2})
  - Land: 22.09 sq mi (57.22 km^{2})
  - Water: 2.05 sq mi (5.30 km^{2})
- Elevation: 10 ft (3.0 m)

Population (2020)
  - Total: 85,951
  - Density: 3,890.4/sq mi (1,502.11/km^{2})
- Time zone: UTC-5 (Eastern (EST))
  - Summer (DST): UTC-4 (EDT)
- ZIP code: 33615
- Area code: 813
- FIPS code: 12-72145
- GNIS feature ID: 2402937

Town 'n' Country is a census-designated place (CDP) in Hillsborough County, Florida, United States. The population was 85,951 at the 2020 census.

Within Town 'n' Country are located Bay Crest Park, Countryway, Rocky Creek, Sweetwater Creek.

== History ==
Prior to the 1950s, Town 'n' Country was primarily natural areas and cattle farms. In 1958, the LaMonte-Shimberg Corporation purchased a 525-acre dairy farm from the Webb family near the Hillsborough Avenue-Memorial intersection to construct the Town 'n' Country Park subdivision, making the area one of Tampa’s first suburban communities. By the time the original developers and builders of Town 'n' Country had built their last house, the area covered more than 2,000 acres and stretched over three miles from Memorial Highway on the south to north of Waters Avenue. In this area, nearly 8,000 single-family homes and townhouses were built from 1958 to 1978 by LaMonte-Shimberg.

== Geography ==
Town 'n' Country is located in western Hillsborough County. It is bordered to the south by the city of Tampa and is about 12 miles (19 km) northwest of downtown. The CDP is bordered to the north by Westchase, Citrus Park, and Carrollwood, and to the east by Egypt Lake-Leto. To the west is the city of Oldsmar in Pinellas County. The northwest portion of Tampa International Airport is located within Town 'n' Country CDP.

According to the United States Census Bureau, the CDP has a total area of 24.1 square miles (62.5 km^{2}), of which 22.1 square miles (57.3 km^{2}) are land and 2.0 square miles (5.2 km^{2}), or 8.39%, are water.

== Demographics ==
Historical population
Census	Pop.	Note	%±
1970	19,453		—
1980	37,834		94.5%
1990	60,946		61.1%
2000	72,523		19.0%
2010	78,422		8.1%
2020	85,951		9.6%

=== Racial and ethnic composition ===
Town 'n' Country CDP, Florida – Racial and ethnic composition Note: the US Census treats Hispanic/Latino as an ethnic category. This table excludes Latinos from the racial categories and assigns them to a separate category. Hispanics/Latinos may be of any race.
Race / Ethnicity (NH = Non-Hispanic)	Pop 2000	Pop 2010	Pop 2020	% 2000	% 2010	% 2020
White alone (NH)	42,405	32,992	27,344	58.47%	42.06%	31.81%
Black or African American alone (NH)	5,225	6,169	5,783	7.20%	7.86%	6.73%
Native American or Alaska Native alone (NH)	195	172	117	0.27%	0.22%	0.14%
Asian alone (NH)	2,328	3,139	4,527	3.21%	4.00%	5.27%
Native Hawaiian or Pacific Islander alone (NH)	46	39	53	0.06%	0.05%	0.06%
Other race alone (NH)	193	266	774	0.27%	0.34%	0.90%
Mixed race or Multiracial (NH)	1,121	1,285	2,911	1.55%	1.64%	3.39%
Hispanic or Latino (any race)	21,010	34,380	44,442	28.97%	43.83%	51.71%
Total	72,523	78,442	85,951	100.00%	100.00%	100.00%

=== 2020 census ===
As of the 2020 census, Town 'n' Country had a population of 85,951. The median age was 39.3 years. 19.5% of residents were under the age of 18 and 14.6% of residents were 65 years of age or older. For every 100 females there were 95.7 males, and for every 100 females age 18 and over there were 93.5 males age 18 and over.

99.8% of residents lived in urban areas, while 0.2% lived in rural areas.

There were 33,241 households in Town 'n' Country, of which 30.1% had children under the age of 18 living in them. Of all households, 41.6% were married-couple households, 20.1% were households with a male householder and no spouse or partner present, and 28.6% were households with a female householder and no spouse or partner present. About 26.0% of all households were made up of individuals and 7.9% had someone living alone who was 65 years of age or older.

There were 35,174 housing units, of which 5.5% were vacant. The homeowner vacancy rate was 1.4% and the rental vacancy rate was 6.6%.

Racial composition as of the 2020 census
Race	Number	Percent
White	36,949	43.0%
Black or African American	6,716	7.8%
American Indian and Alaska Native	339	0.4%
Asian	4,619	5.4%
Native Hawaiian and Other Pacific Islander	69	0.1%
Some other race	11,942	13.9%
Two or more races	25,317	29.5%

=== 2010 census ===
As of the 2010 United States census, there were 78,422 people, 30,763 households, and 19,054 families residing in the CDP.

In 2010, there were 30,763 households in the CDP, out of which 33.5% had children under the age of 18 living with them, 42.7% were headed by married couples living together, 13.9% had a female householder with no husband present, and 35.3% were non-families. 26.2% of all households were made up of individuals, and 6.6% were someone living alone who was 65 years of age or older. The average household size was 2.57, and the average family size was 3.10.

In 2010, in the CDP, 22.2% of the population were under the age of 18, 9.6% were from 18 to 24, 30.3% were from 25 to 44, 26.2% were from 45 to 64, and 11.6% were 65 years of age or older. The median age was 37.2 years. For every 100 females, there were 95.1 males. For every 100 females age 18 and over, there were 92.3 males.

=== 2011–2015 American Community Survey estimates ===
For the period 2011–15, the estimated median annual income for a household in the CDP was $49,559, and the median income for a family was $54,644. Male full-time workers had a median income of $39,453 versus $36,374 for females. The per capita income for the CDP was $25,195. About 13.0% of families and 15.7% of the population were below the poverty line, including 25.4% of those under age 18 and 11.9% of those age 65 or over.
