= West Paris Historic District =

Historic district in Tennessee, United States

- U.S. National Register of Historic Places
- U.S. Historic district
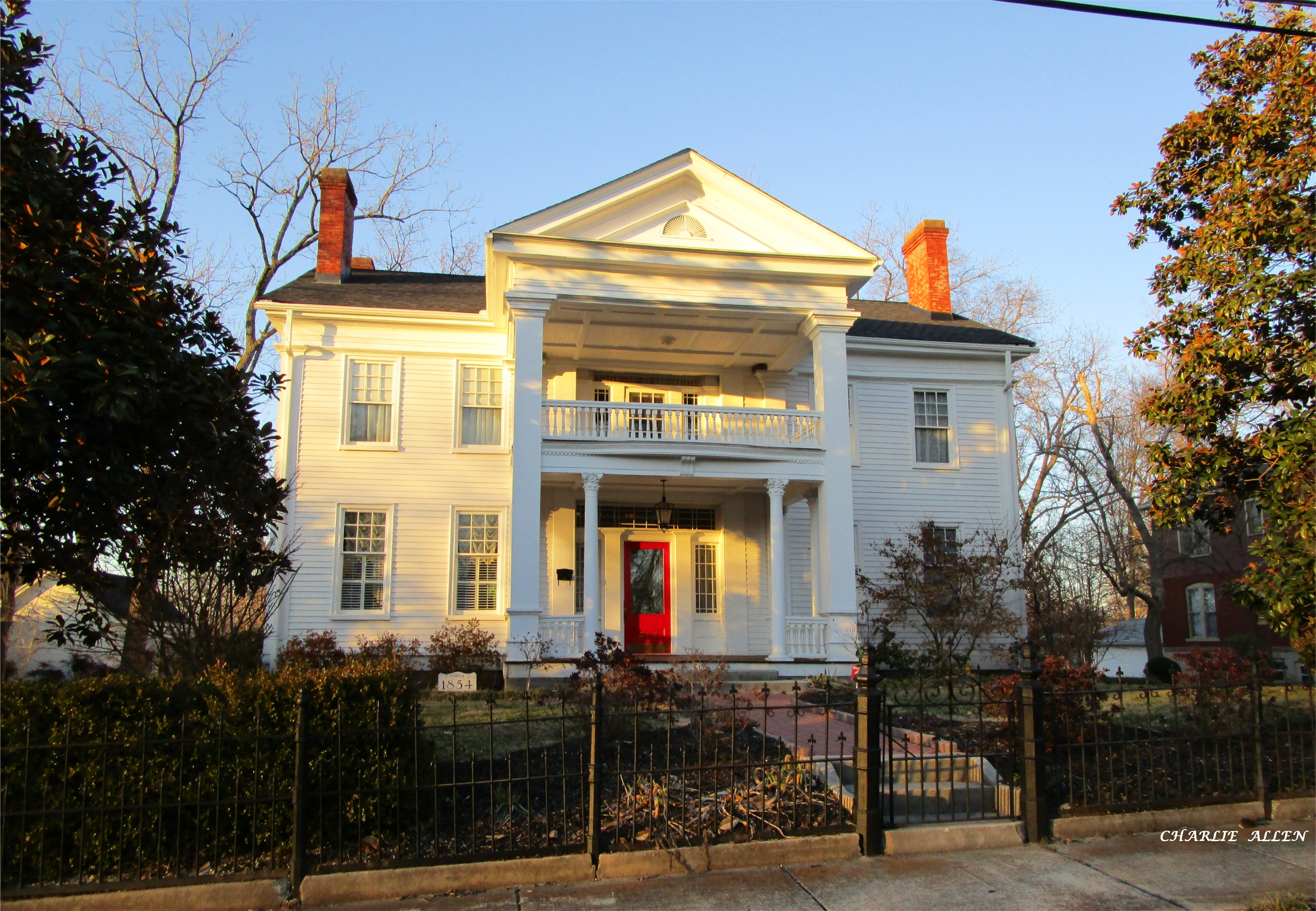
- House at 1854 Hudson Ave.

- Location within Tennessee Location within the United States
- Location: Along sections of West Washington, North College and Hudson Streets, Paris, Henry County, Tennessee
- Coordinates: 36°18′14″N 88°19′50″W
- Architectural style: Queen Anne
- NRHP reference No.: 88001432
- Added to NRHP: September 7, 1988

The West Paris Historic District is a historic district in Paris, Henry County, Tennessee.

It was added to the National Register of Historic Places in 1988.
