= Robert E. Lee School (Paris, Tennessee) =

- U.S. National Register of Historic Places
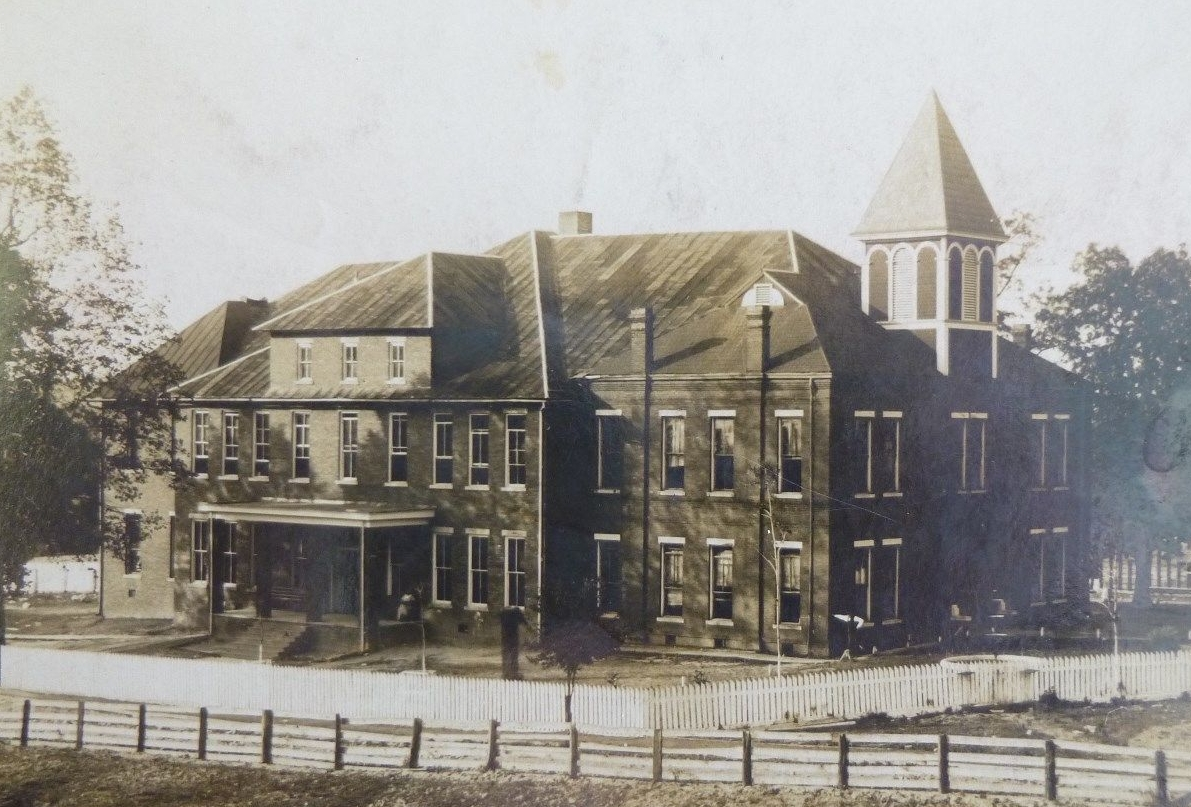

- Location within Tennessee Location within the United States
- Location: 402 Lee Street, Paris, Henry County, Tennessee
- Coordinates: 36°18′21″N 88°19′48″W
- Built: 1893
- NRHP reference No.: 88001426
- Added to NRHP: September 7, 1988

The Robert E. Lee School is a historic school building located at 402 Lee Street, Paris, Henry County, Tennessee.

It was built in 1893 and added to the National Register in 1988.

== History ==
Land for a new school was donated by Judge John C. Hamilton in 1848. Trustees for the Paris Male Academy contracted John Oury on August 30 of that year to construct a brick building fifty feet by thirty-two feet with eighteen inch thick outer walls. Cost upon completion was $2,470. A bell was later installed in September 1849.

Paris Male Academy operated as a private school until 1881 when it became public and renamed itself the Paris Public School. After legislation was passed affecting other schools in the city, Paris Public School became City High School, teaching ten grades, in the fall of 1891. In December of that year, the school building burned.

A movement to rebuild the school began in early 1892, which was completed and opened in September 1893 as City High School. This is the building that survives today.

The school became known as the Robert E. Lee School about 1910.

The building was used for school and classroom purposes until 1975 when new buildings were constructed elsewhere. The Paris Special School District used the building until 2001.

The Robert E. Lee School Association (RELSA), a non-profit organization, took the building over in 2001 and began restoring it with grant money and fundraising efforts. In 2003, the building became the home to the Robert E. Lee Academy for the Arts.

On August 27, 2020 the Board of Directors announced that the Board has voted to change the name of the historic Robert E. Lee School to the Paris Academy for the Arts.
