= Judge John C. Sweeney House =

- U.S. National Register of Historic Places
- U.S. Historic district
- Location within Tennessee Location within the United States
- Location: 1212 Chickasaw Road, Paris, Henry County, Tennessee
- Coordinates: 36°18′32″N 88°18′11″W
- Built: 1885
- NRHP reference No.: 88001427
- Added to NRHP: September 7, 1988

The Judge John C. Sweeney House is a historic home located at 1212 Chickasaw Road, Paris, Henry County, Tennessee.

It was built in 1885 and added to the National Register in 1988.
