= Thomas P. Jernigan House =

- U.S. National Register of Historic Places
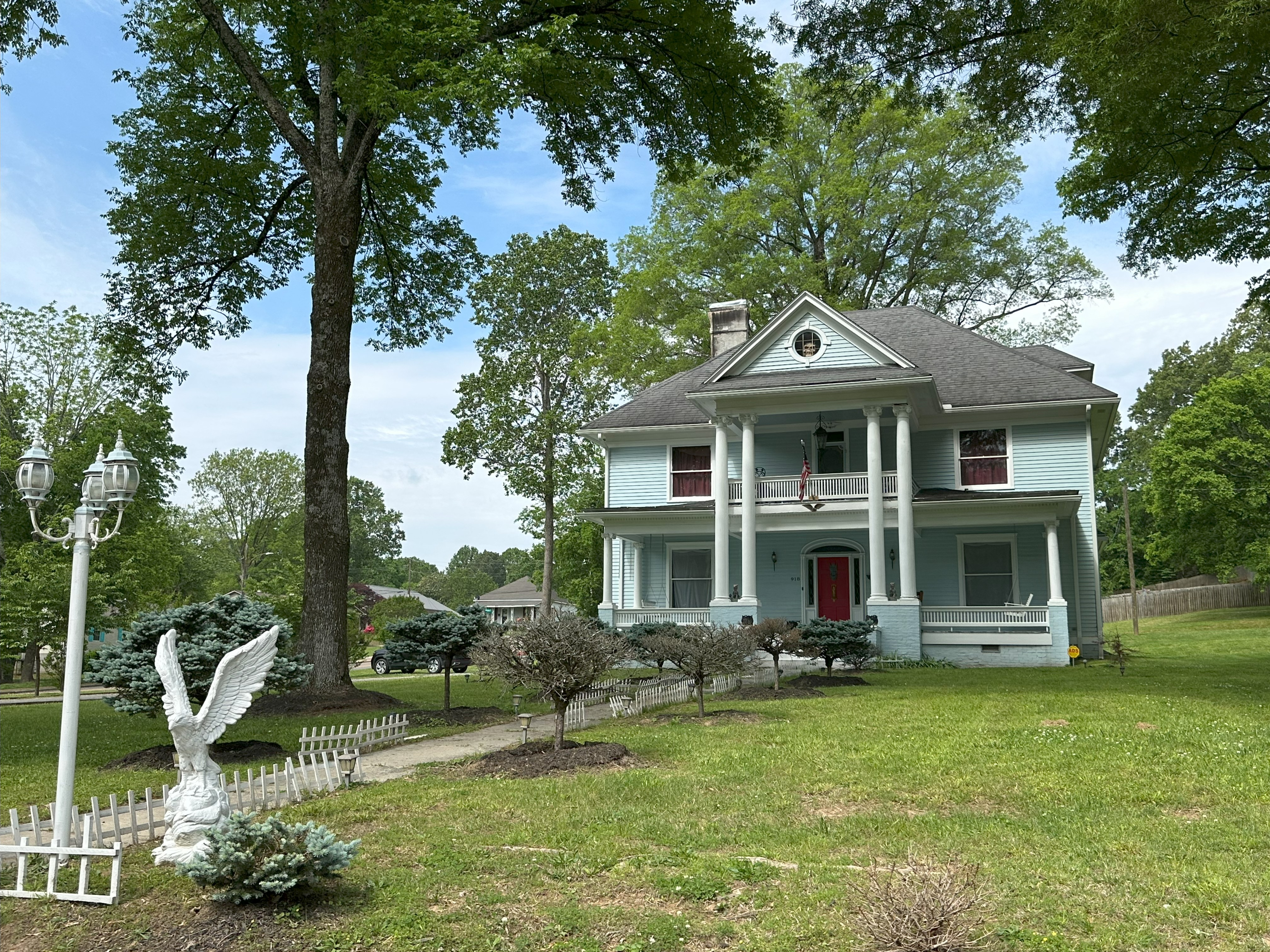
- Thomas P. Jernigan House in 2025

- Location within Tennessee Location within the United States
- Location: 918 Dunlap Street; Paris, Tennessee
- Coordinates: 36°17′27″N 88°19′34″W
- Built: 1905
- Architectural style: Classical Revival
- NRHP reference No.: 88001430
- Added to NRHP: September 7, 1988

The Thomas P. Jernigan House is a historic home located at 918 Dunlap Street, Paris, Henry County, Tennessee.

It was built in 1905 and added to the National Register in 1988.
