= Whitlock, Tennessee =

- Unincorporated community
- Location within Tennessee Location within the United States
- Coordinates: 36°22′15″N 88°21′25″W
- Country: United States
- State: Tennessee
- County: Henry

Area
  - Total: 0.76 sq mi (1.97 km^{2})
  - Land: 0.76 sq mi (1.97 km^{2})
  - Water: 0.0039 sq mi (0.01 km^{2})
- Elevation: 532 ft (162 m)

Population (2020)
  - Total: 95
  - Density: 125.0/sq mi (48.28/km^{2})
- Time zone: UTC-6 (Central (CST))
  - Summer (DST): UTC-5 (CDT)
- Area code: 731
- GNIS feature ID: 1274481

Whitlock is an unincorporated community in Henry County, Tennessee, United States.

== Demographics ==
Historical population
Census	Pop.	Note	%±
2020	95		—
U.S. Decennial Census
