= Old Springville, Tennessee =

- Unincorporated community
- Location within Tennessee Location within the United States
- Coordinates: 36°17′17″N 88°08′43″W
- Country: United States
- State: Tennessee
- County: Henry
- Elevation: 381 ft (116 m)
- Time zone: UTC-6 (Central (CST))
  - Summer (DST): UTC-5 (CDT)
- Area code: 731
- GNIS feature ID: 1296373

Old Springville is an unincorporated community in Henry County, Tennessee, United States.
