= E. K. Jernigan House =

- U.S. National Register of Historic Places
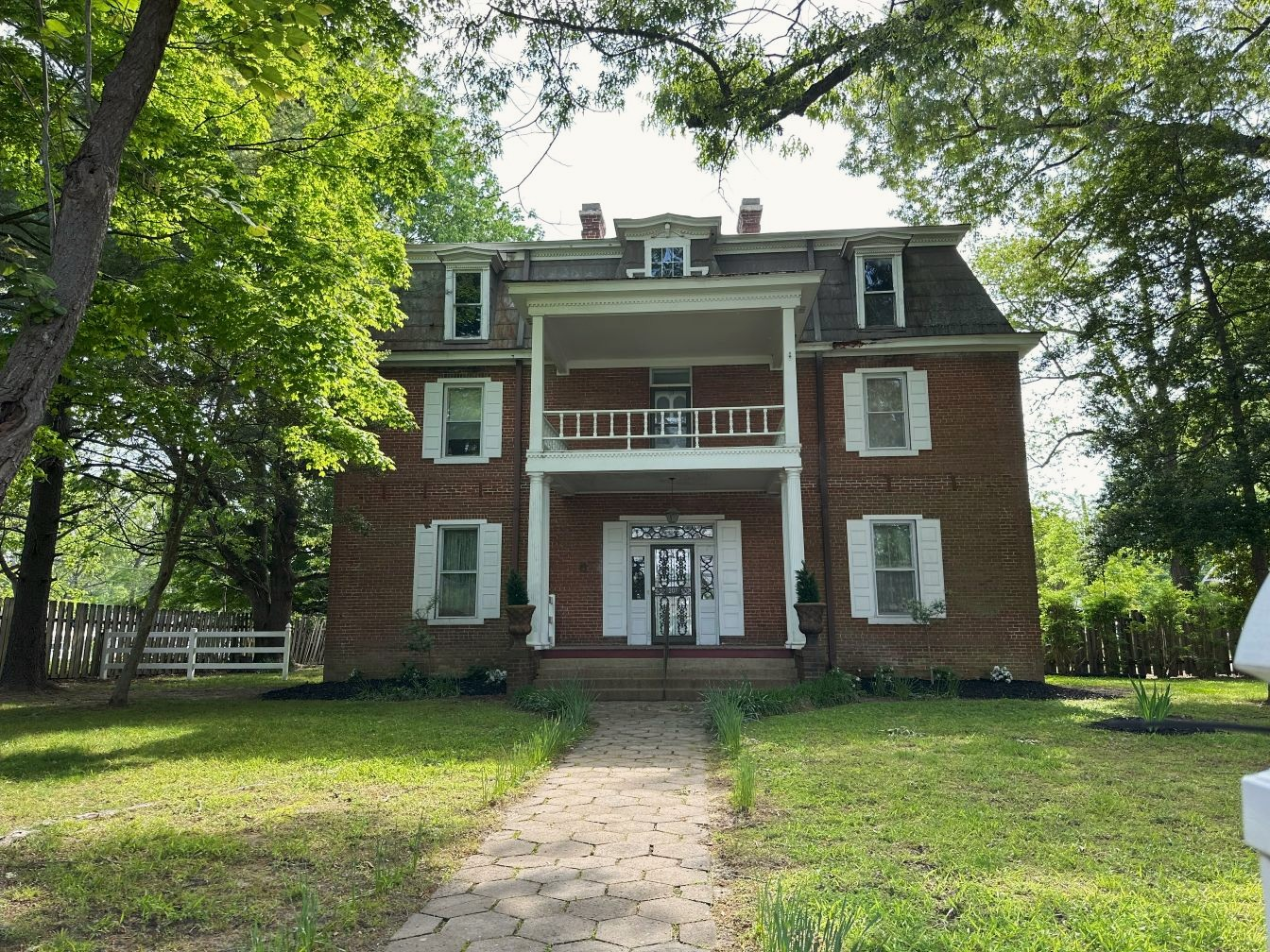

- Location within Tennessee Location within the United States
- Location: 207 Dunlap Street; Paris, Tennessee
- Coordinates: 36°18′05″N 88°19′23″W
- Built: 1910
- Architectural style: Second Empire
- NRHP reference No.: 88001429
- Added to NRHP: September 7, 1988

The E. K. Jernigan House is a historic home located at 207 Dunlap Street, Paris, Henry County, Tennessee.

It was built in 1910 and added to the National Register in 1988.
