= Midway (south), Henry County, Tennessee =

Midway
- Unincorporated community
- Location within Tennessee Location within the United States
- Coordinates: 36°17′01″N 88°27′56″W
- Country: United States
- State: Tennessee
- County: Henry
- Elevation: 495 ft (151 m)
- Time zone: UTC-6 (Central (CST))
  - Summer (DST): UTC-5 (CDT)
- Area code: 731
- GNIS feature ID: 1315502

Midway is an unincorporated community in Henry County, Tennessee. Midway is located near Tennessee State Route 54 in the western part of Henry County, 7.85 miles (12.63 km) west-southwest of Paris. Barrs Chapel C.M.E. Church, which is listed on the National Register of Historic Places, is located in Midway.
