= Cottage Grove, Tennessee =

- Town
- Location of Cottage Grove in Henry County, Tennessee.
- Coordinates: 36°22′43″N 88°28′49″W
- Country: United States
- State: Tennessee
- County: Henry

Area
  - Total: 0.17 sq mi (0.44 km^{2})
  - Land: 0.17 sq mi (0.44 km^{2})
  - Water: 0 sq mi (0.00 km^{2})
- Elevation: 571 ft (174 m)

Population (2020)
  - Total: 66
  - Density: 386/sq mi (148.9/km^{2})
- Time zone: UTC-6 (Central (CST))
  - Summer (DST): UTC-5 (CDT)
- ZIP code: 38224
- Area code: 731
- FIPS code: 47-17340
- GNIS feature ID: 1306125

Cottage Grove is a town in Henry County, Tennessee, United States. As of the 2020 census, Cottage Grove had a population of 66. Cottage Grove is currently the smallest town in Tennessee.

== Geography ==
Cottage Grove is located at 36°22′43″N 88°28′49″W (36.378609, -88.480293).

According to the United States Census Bureau, the town has a total area of 0.2 square miles (0.52 km^{2}), all land.

== Demographics ==
Historical population
Census	Pop.	Note	%±
1880	172		—
1910	215		—
1920	210		−2.3%
1930	188		−10.5%
1940	172		−8.5%
1950	126		−26.7%
1960	130		3.2%
1970	119		−8.5%
1980	117		−1.7%
1990	85		−27.4%
2000	97		14.1%
2010	88		−9.3%
2020	66		−25.0%

As of the census of 2000, there were 97 people, 41 households, and 30 families residing in the town. The population density was 506.0 inhabitants per square mile (195.4/km^{2}). There were 52 housing units at an average density of 271.3 per square mile (104.7/km^{2}). The racial makeup of the town was 97.94% White, 1.03% from other races, and 1.03% from two or more races. Hispanic or Latino of any race were 1.03% of the population.

There were 41 households, out of which 29.3% had children under the age of 18 living with them, 58.5% were married couples living together, 14.6% had a female householder with no husband present, and 26.8% were non-families. 24.4% of all households were made up of individuals, and 9.8% had someone living alone who was 65 years of age or older. The average household size was 2.37 and the average family size was 2.80.

In the town, the population was spread out, with 22.7% under the age of 18, 9.3% from 18 to 24, 37.1% from 25 to 44, 18.6% from 45 to 64, and 12.4% who were 65 years of age or older. The median age was 34 years. For every 100 females, there were 79.6 males. For every 100 females age 18 and over, there were 82.9 males.

The median income for a household in the town was $25,000, and the median income for a family was $28,750. Males had a median income of $31,250 versus $24,375 for females. The per capita income for the town was $13,608. There were 21.9% of families and 19.4% of the population living below the poverty line, including 23.1% of under eighteens and none of those over 64.

== Climate ==
The climate in this area is characterized by hot, humid summers and generally mild to cool winters. According to the Köppen Climate Classification system, Cottage Grove has a humid subtropical climate, abbreviated "Cfa" on climate maps.
