= Baron Bruce =

This may refer to:

- Baron Bruce of Anandale (1295), a subsidiary title for the Earl of Carrick, abeyant 1371
- Baron Bruce of Whorlton (1641), formerly a subsidiary title for the Earl of Elgin and Kincardine, extinct 1747
- Baron Bruce of Skelton (1664), formerly a subsidiary title for the Earl of Ailesbury, extinct 1747
- Baron Bruce of Tottenham (1746), a subsidiary title for the Marquess of Ailesbury
