= Como, Tennessee =

- Unincorporated community
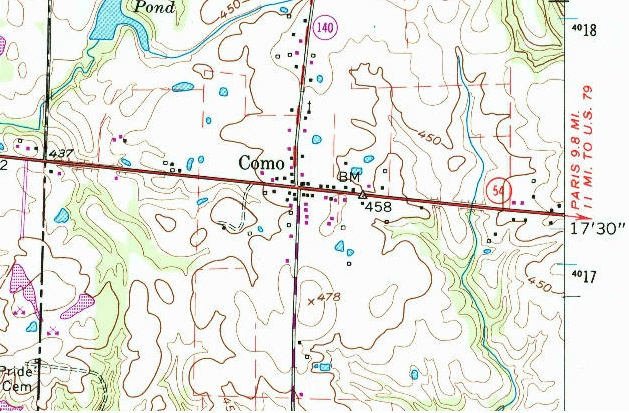
- Como appearing on 1957 USGS map excerpt

- Location within Tennessee Location within the United States
- Coordinates: 36°17′35″N 88°30′44″W
- Country: United States
- State: Tennessee
- County: Henry
- Elevation: 453 ft (138 m)
- Time zone: UTC-6 (Central (CST))
  - Summer (DST): UTC-5 (CDT)
- ZIP code: 38223
- Area code: 731
- GNIS feature ID: 1281048

Como is an unincorporated community in Henry County, Tennessee, United States. It is centered at the intersection of Tennessee State Route 54 and Tennessee State Route 140, appproximately 10 miles west of Paris, Tennessee, which is the county seat. Its ZIP code is 38223.

== History ==
A fire in 1925 caused significant damage to the village, destroying two general stores, two garages, a drug store, a blacksmith shop, four homes, and the Odd Fellows home.

Como's population was 125 in 1940.
