= H. L. Bruce House =

Historic house in Tennessee, United States

- U.S. National Register of Historic Places
- U.S. Historic district
- Location within Tennessee Location within the United States
- Location: 202 South Poplar Street, Paris, Henry County, Tennessee
- Coordinates: 36°18′04″N 88°19′32″W
- Built: 1910
- Architectural style: Classical Revival
- NRHP reference No.: 88001431
- Added to NRHP: September 7, 1988

H. L. Bruce House is a historic home at 202 South Poplar Street, Paris, Henry County, Tennessee.

It was built in 1910 and added to the National Register in 1988.

Sometime around 1994, the house was destroyed and consequently it was removed from the National Register of Historic Places on 19 November 2014. A parking lot for a nearby church now exists on the site.
