= Buchanan, Tennessee =

Unincorporated community in Tennessee, US

Coordinates: 36°26′13″N 88°12′30″W

Buchanan is an unincorporated community in Henry County, Tennessee. It is located about six miles west of Paris Landing State Park, which is located on the Tennessee River on the west bank of Kentucky Lake.

Buchanan was founded in the 1840s. As of 2008, the community has a post office, feed mill, a volunteer fire station, two churches, a Masonic hall and several houses. The zip code (38222) includes Paris Landing State Park.
