= Drury Lane =

Street in central London, England

Coordinates: 51°30′54″N 0°07′22″W

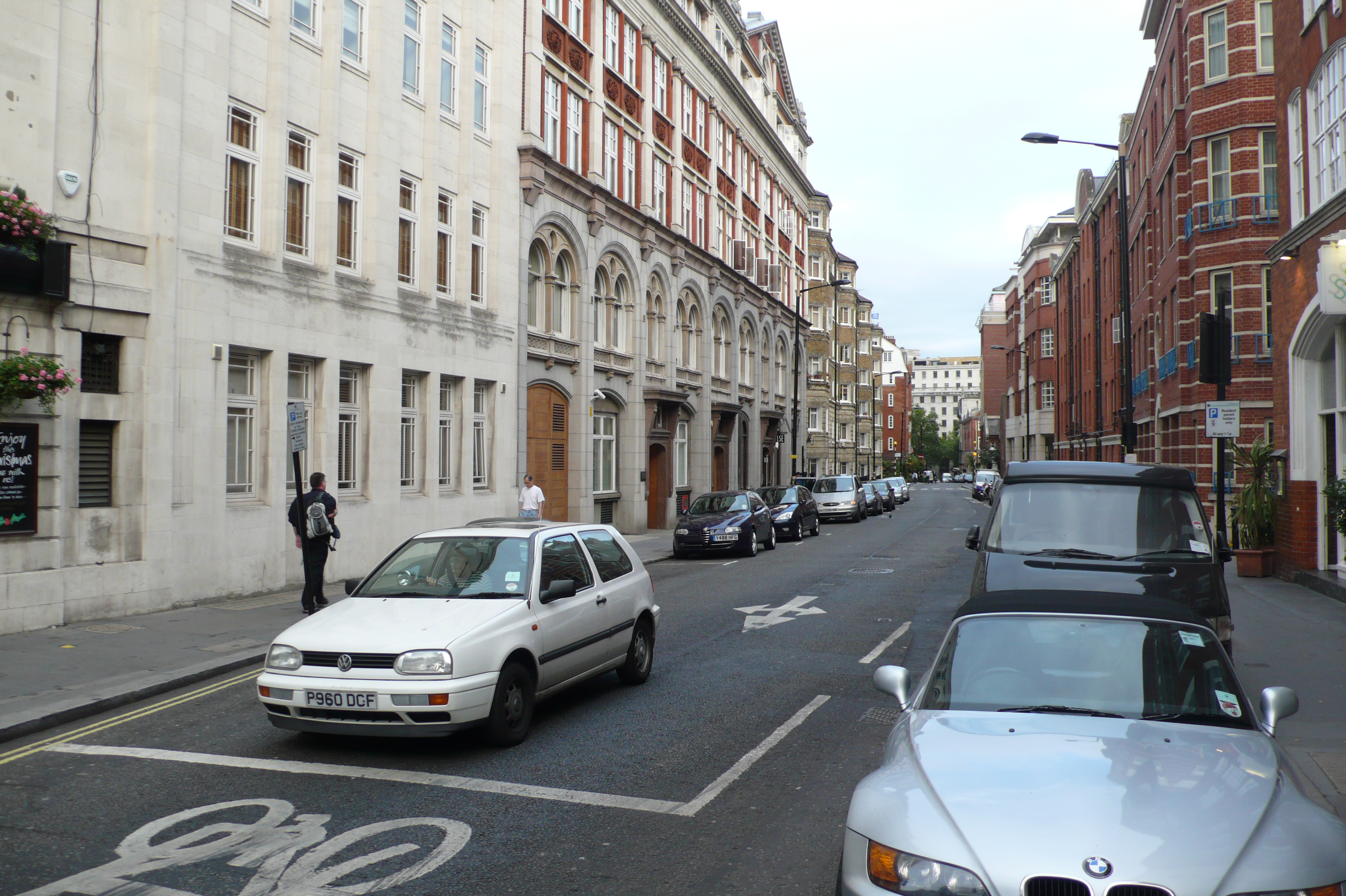
Drury Lane looking south from Long Acre towards Aldwych

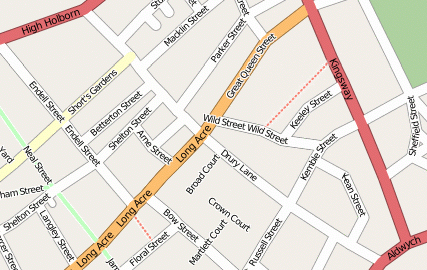
Drury Lane and surrounding streets

Drury Lane is a street on the boundary between the Covent Garden and Holborn areas of London, running between Aldwych and High Holborn. The northern part is in the borough of Camden and the southern part in the City of Westminster. Drury Lane is part of London's West End Theatreland.

== Notable landmarks ==
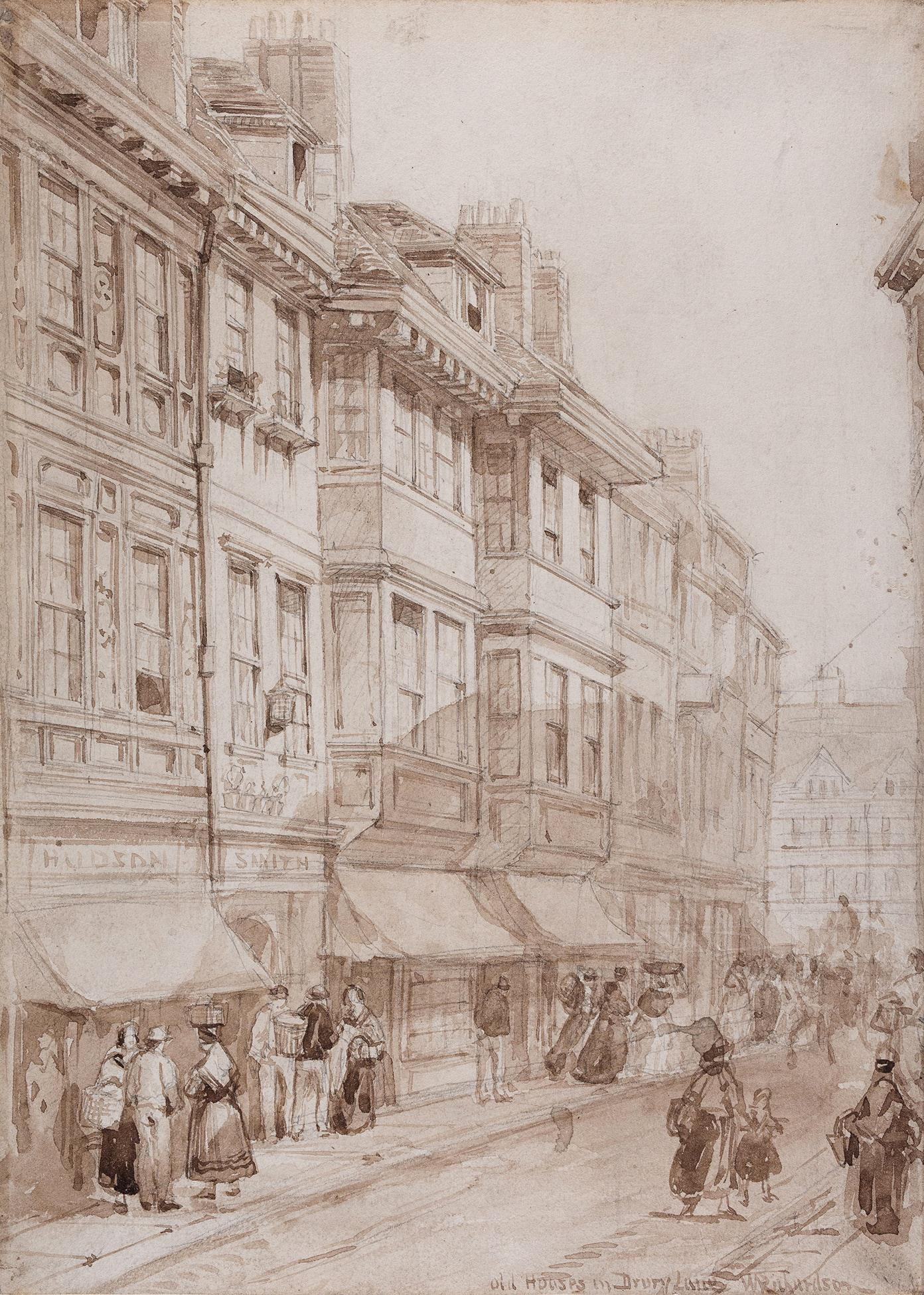
Old Houses in Drury Lane (1875) by William R. Richardson

The street originated as an early medieval lane referred to in Latin as the Via de Aldwych, which probably connected St. Giles Leper Hospital with the fields of Aldwych Close, owned by the hospital but traditionally said to have been granted to the Danes as part of a peace treaty with King Alfred the Great in Saxon times. It acquired its name from the Suffolk barrister Sir Robert Drury, who built a mansion called Drury House on the lane around 1500. After the death in 1615 of his great-great-grandson, another Robert Drury, the property passed out of the family. It became the London house of the Earl of Craven, then a public house under the sign of his reputed mistress, the Queen of Bohemia. Subsequently, the gardens and courtyards of the house were built over with rows of small houses. The remains of the house itself, which had been progressively demolished, were finally cleared in 1809. By this time, Drury Lane had become one of the worst slums in London, dominated by prostitution and gin palaces. The area was eventually cleared to make way for the developments of Kingsway and Aldwych.

The Muffin Man resided on Drury Lane, according to the famous nursery rhyme.

The term "Drury Lane" is often used to refer to the Theatre Royal, Drury Lane, which has in different incarnations been located in the street since the 17th century, even though today the main entrance is on Catherine Street. Also in Drury Lane is the Gillian Lynne Theatre. 173 Drury Lane was the location of the first J Sainsbury store. The store was opened in 1869 and the company is now one of the UK's largest supermarket chains.

== See also ==
- Colley Cibber
- Covent Garden
- List of eponymous roads in London
- The Muffin Man
- Restoration comedy
- Bruce House
