= Bruce, West Virginia =

Unincorporated community in West Virginia, United States

Bruce
- Unincorporated community
- Location within the state of West Virginia
- Coordinates: 38°09′47″N 80°46′36″W
- Country: United States
- State: West Virginia
- County: Nicholas
- Elevation: 2,631 ft (802 m)
- Time zone: UTC-5 (Eastern (EST))
  - Summer (DST): UTC-4 (EDT)
- GNIS feature ID: 1553997

Bruce is an unincorporated community in Nicholas County, in the U.S. state of West Virginia.

== History ==
A post office called Bruce was established in 1901, and remained in operation until 1958. Just who the namesake of Bruce was remains uncertain.
