= Bruce House, London =

Residential building in London

Bruce House
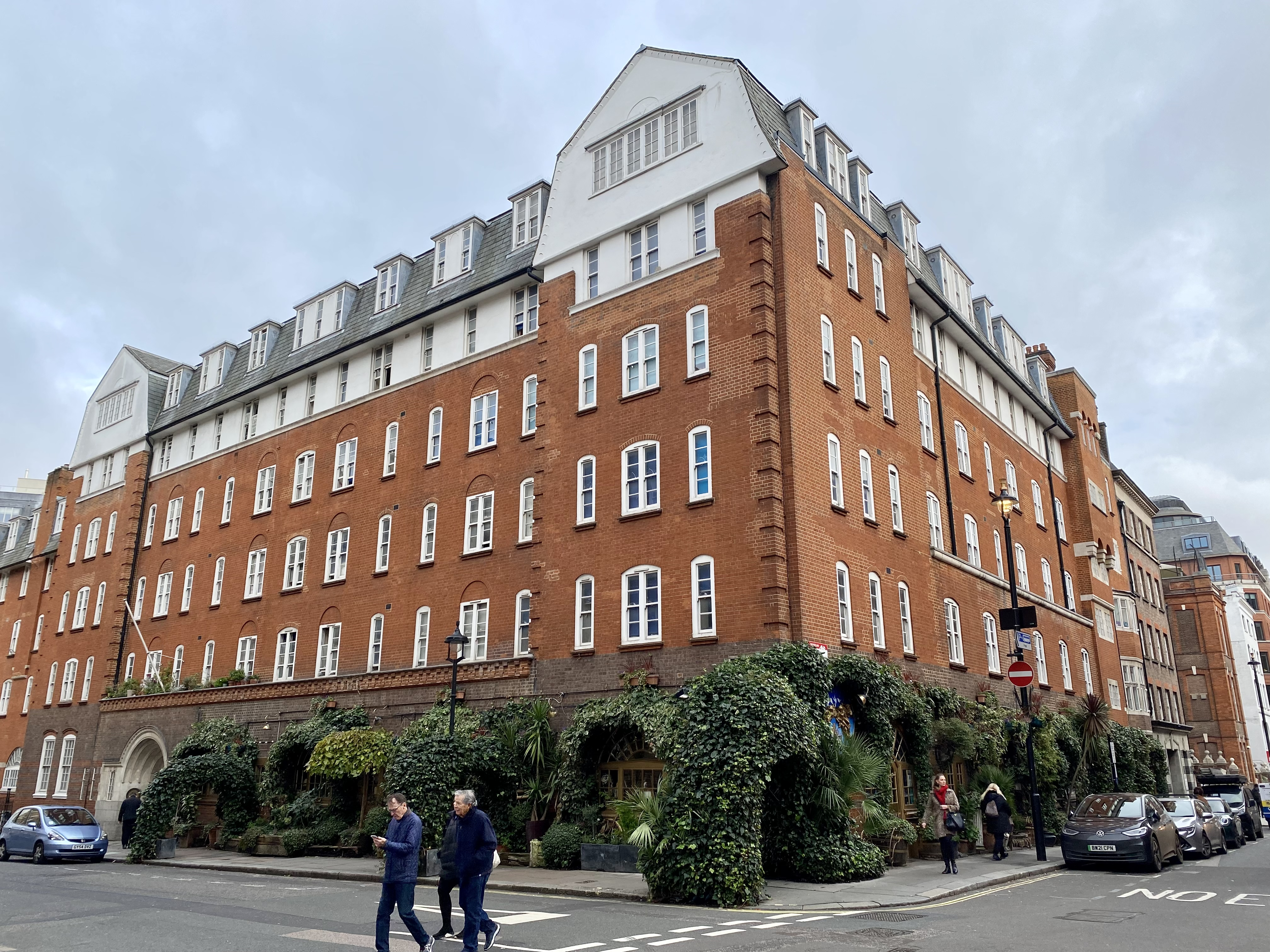
- Bruce House

General information
- Type: Residential
- Location: London, England
- Coordinates: 51°30′50″N 0°07′10″W
- Completed: 1906

Design and construction
- Architect: William Riley

Listed Building – Grade II
- Official name: Bruce House
- Designated: 14 January 1970
- Reference no.: 1275722

Bruce House is a Grade II listed residential building on the corner of Kemble Street and Drury Lane in the Covent Garden area of central London.

== History ==
Bruce House sits opposite the Wild Street Peabody Estate. Both lie along Drury Lane which was known for its slums, particularly those centred around Clare Market. Slum clearances commenced in the 1900s with the construction of the Aldwych and Kingsway road schemes to improve traffic flows. Bruce House was among many developments built to replace the slums.

Bruce House was the third of three lodging-houses built by the London County Council following the success of the Rowton Houses. The house was designed by architect William Riley and was named after William Wallace Bruce, chairman of the LCC's housing committee.
