= Broxson, Florida =

- Unincorporated community
- Location within Florida
- Coordinates: 30°34′04″N 86°55′19″W
- Country: United States
- State: Florida
- County: Santa Rosa
- Elevation: 7 ft (2.1 m)

Population (Note: Some uncounted residents from local communities consider themselves as residents of Broxson)
  - Total: 0
- Time zone: UTC-6 (Central (CST))
  - Summer (DST): UTC-5 (CDT)
- Area code: 850
- GNIS feature ID: 294697

Broxson is an unincorporated community in Santa Rosa County, Florida, United States. The community is located on Florida State Road 87, 8.4 miles (13.5 km) southeast of Milton. Broxson is located between the Yellow River and the ridges and plateau of Eglin Air Force Base (many with varying, largely unofficial names).

Broxson is likely named after the Broxson family, one of whom is currently a Florida state Senator, Doug Broxson, though accounts are relatively scarce. Few remaining citizens in the area consider themselves part of Broxon, as most of the original land and residences are now abandoned, now part of Eglin Air Force Base.
