= Bay Crest Park, Florida =

- Unincorporated community
- Location within Florida Location within the United States
- Coordinates: 27°59′54″N 82°35′08″W
- Country: United States
- State: Florida
- County: Hillsborough

Area
  - Total: 0.42 sq mi (1.09 km^{2})
- Elevation: 7 ft (2.1 m)

Population (2010)
  - Total: 2,744
  - Density: 6,520/sq mi (2,520/km^{2})
- Time zone: UTC-5 (Eastern (EST))
  - Summer (DST): UTC-4 (EDT)
- ZIP code: 33615
- FIPS code: 12-03937
- GNIS feature ID: 2481525

Bay Crest Park is an unincorporated community in Hillsborough County, Florida, United States.

== Designation and population ==
Although a separate community, it is a part of the census-designated place (CDP) of Town 'n' Country. The ZIP code for the community is 33615. The area reported as a census-designated place by the U.S. Census Bureau in 1980 as "Bay Crest", which included the southern portion of Town 'n' Country's census area. The population recorded was 5,927.

As of the 2010 census the community had a population of 2,744 with a population density of 6,499 persons per square mile.

== Geography ==
The community has a land area of 0.422 square miles.

== Education ==
The community of Bay Crest Park is served by Hillsborough County Schools.
