= Spring Creek, Henry County, Tennessee =

- Unincorporated community
- Location within Tennessee Location within the United States
- Coordinates: 36°12′19″N 88°12′45″W
- Country: United States
- State: Tennessee
- County: Henry
- Elevation: 430 ft (130 m)
- Time zone: UTC-6 (Central (CST))
  - Summer (DST): UTC-5 (CDT)
- Area code: 731
- GNIS feature ID: 1314324

Spring Creek is an unincorporated community in Henry County, Tennessee, United States. Spring Creek is 9.2 miles (14.8 km) southeast of Paris.
