= Bruce Creek (Washington) =

Stream in Stevens County, Washington, U.S.

Coordinates: 48°43′09″N 117°57′24″W

Bruce Creek is a stream in Stevens County, Washington, in the United States.

Bruce Creek was named for John Bruce, a 19th-century miner.

== See also ==
- List of rivers of Washington (state)
