= Bartram Springs, Florida =

Neighborhood of Jacksonville, Florida

Coordinates: 30.111700°N 81.498250°W

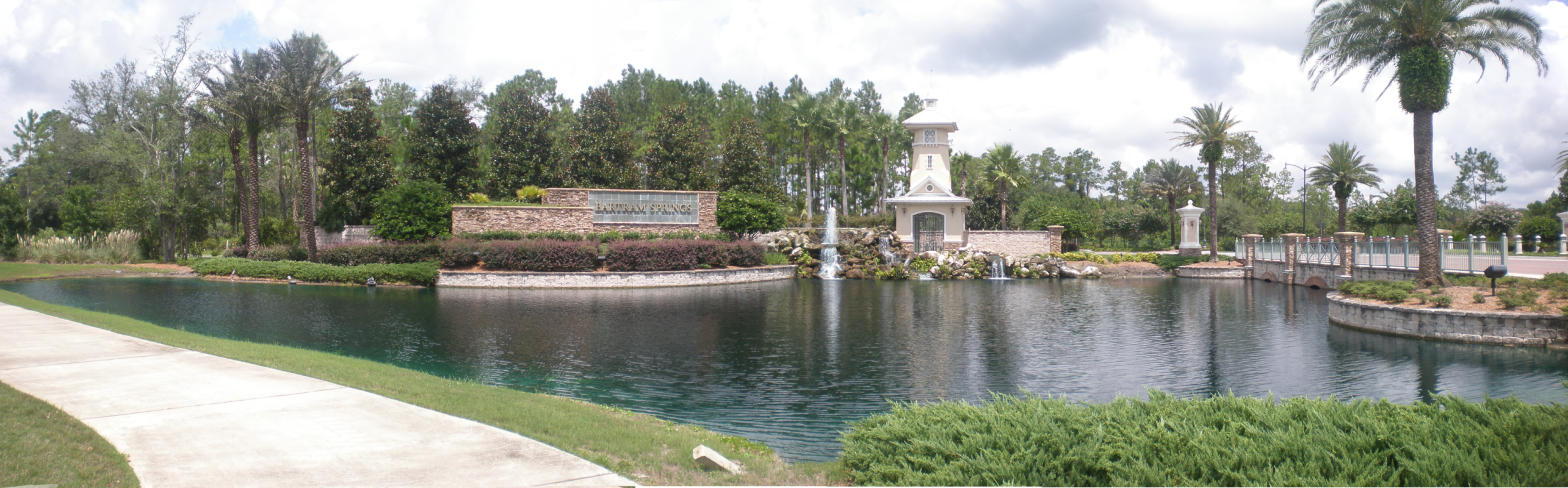
West side of main entrance to Bartram Springs

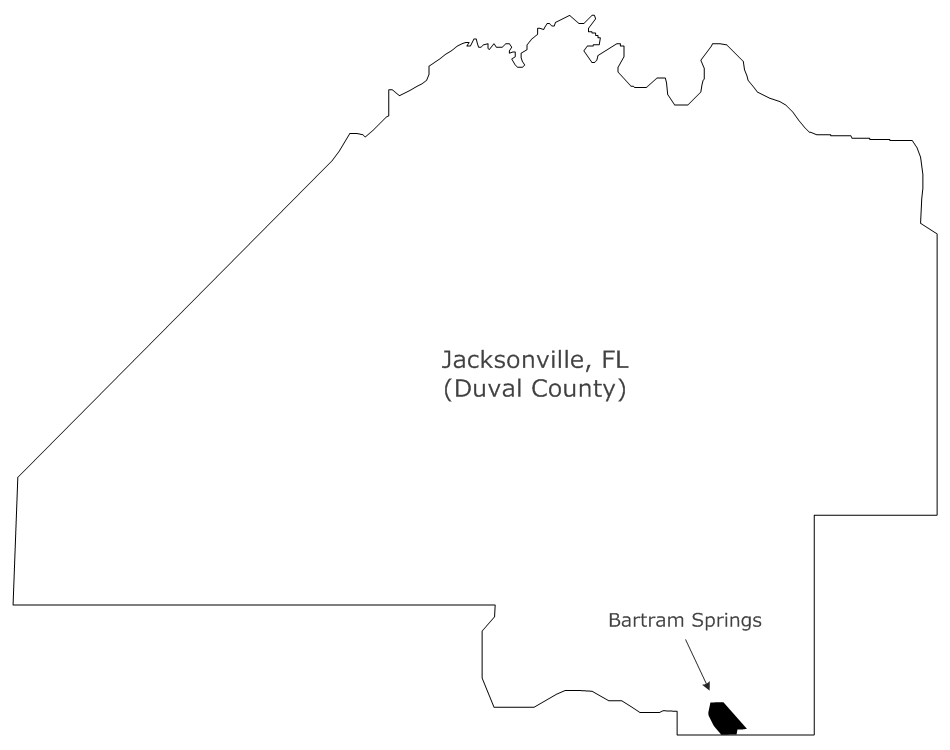
The shaded area represents Bartram Springs

Bartram Springs is a master-planned residential community located in Jacksonville, Florida. It resides on the Duval County and St. Johns County line.

== Geography ==
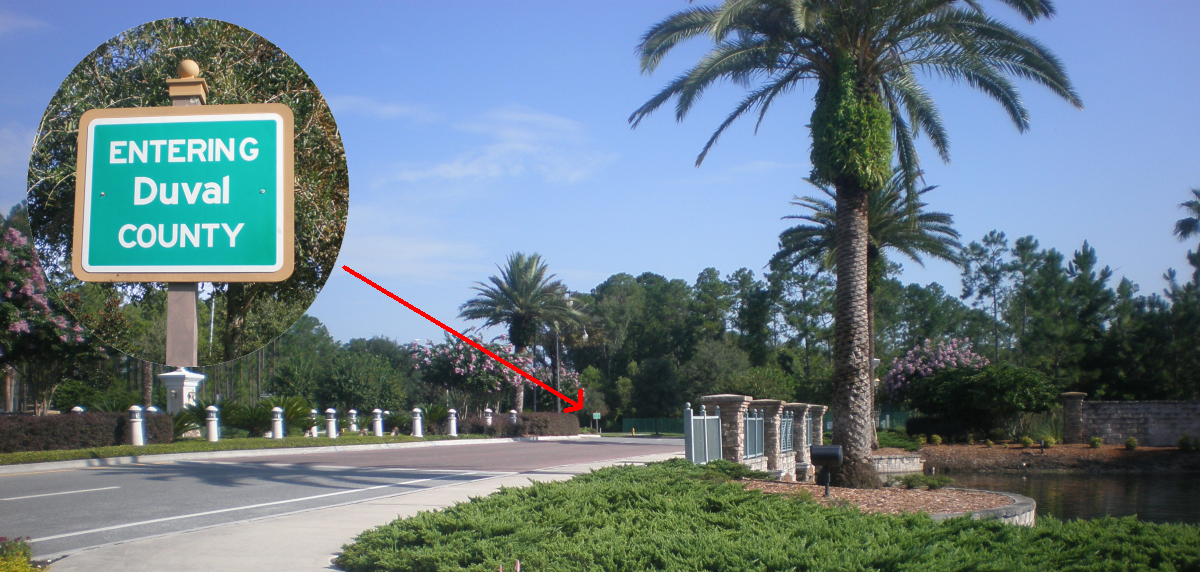
Jacksonville/Duval County line

Bartram Springs is located at the very bottom of Duval County. Interstate 95 borders it on the west side, US 1 borders it on the east side, and Racetrack Road borders it on the south side. The only entrance is on Racetrack Road. Residents actually drive out of Duval County to enter and leave the development, as the first 500 feet (150 m) of Bartram Parkway is located in St. Johns County.

The Bartram Springs development is a part of the Bartram Park DRI (development of regional impact).

== Community design ==
Bartram Springs is a total of 1,025 acres (4.15 km^{2}) is size. Single-family homes account for 449 acres (1.82 km^{2}), and another 32 acres (130,000 m^{2}) are multi-family units in the Villages at Bartram Springs. Roads and right-of-way account for 24 acres (97,000 m^{2}), parks and recreation take up 20 acres (81,000 m^{2}), and 471 acres (1.91 km^{2}) remains wetlands and open space. The new elementary school sits on 21 acres (85,000 m^{2}), and 8 acres (32,000 m^{2}) are designated for commercial use.

Original plans called for 1,400 single-family homes, and 294 units in the Villages of Bartram Springs.

Bartram Springs has a junior sized pool and a children's pool with a waterslide. Homeowners also enjoy tennis courts, a racquetball court, soccer fields, and multiple playgrounds.

=== Government ===
The development is guided by a CDD (community development district) and an HOA (home owners association). The CDD has authority over the common areas and community property in the development. The HOA enforces the local covenants and restrictions that all homeowners in the development are bound to uphold.

=== Construction periods ===
The single-family units of Bartram Springs were built in six main phases of construction. As of Summer 2009, Bartram Springs is considered built-out, and all of the model homes have been sold.

- Phase 1A, 225 dwellings
- Phase 1B, 196 dwellings
- Phase 2, 78 dwellings
- Phase 3A, 334 dwellings
- Phase 3B, 174 dwellings
- Phase 4, 187 dwellings

Based on public tax records, aerial views and the Plat Books filed with the City of Jacksonville, there are actually 1,381 single-family homes in Bartram Springs.

=== Lot sizes ===
Lots in Bartram Springs are classified based on their frontage. Four sizes were specified: 50 feet (15 m), 60 feet, 70 feet (21 m) and 80 feet (24 m). Many of the corner lots have an irregular shape.

=== Streets in Bartram Springs ===
Bartram Springs features 48 individual street names, including the main entrance road. In Phase 1A, 1B and Phase 2, several streets were broken up and given directional suffixes, such as Silver Glen Drive completed in Phase 1A, and Silver Glen Drive East in Phase 1B. Starting with Phase 3A, no more streets were handled this way. Even streets that form a complete loop, such as Bulow Creek Drive, maintain a single name for the whole street.

The speed limit on Bartram Springs Parkway is 40 mph (64 km/h). On Cherry Lake Drive, it is 30 mph (48 km/h). The speed limit is not posted on the remaining streets, however the speed limit is 25 miles per hour. Sidewalks and street lights are present on both sides of the streets.

There is a dedicated bike lane on both sides of Bartram Springs Parkway and both the inner and outer loops of Cherry Lake Drive.

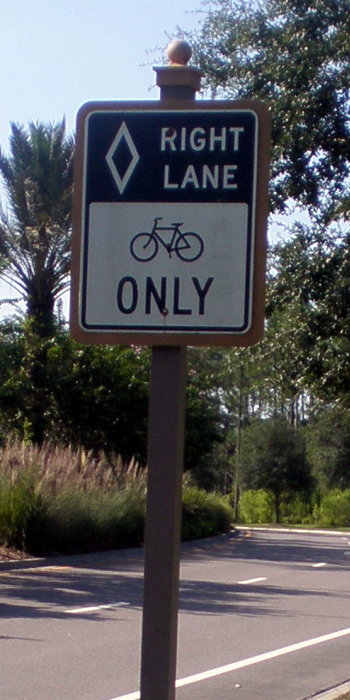
Bartram Springs Parkway bike lane

Street	Single-family Dwellings	Construction Period
Alamosa Circle	65	Phase 4
Aldefer Springs Drive	44	22 in Phase 3A, 22 in Phase 4
Apopka Court	11	Phase 1A
Bartram Springs Parkway	0	Phase 1A
Big Brush Lane	33	Phase 3A
Big Spring Street	34	6 in Phase 2, 28 in Phase 3B
Brush Hollow Road	45	Phase 4
Bulow Creek Drive	77	Phase 3A
Caladesi Court	32	Phase 3A
Cherry Lake Drive East	33	8 in Phase 1A, 25 in Phase 2
Cherry Lake Drive North	21	Phase 2
Cherry Lake Drive West	48	8 in Phase 1A, 8 in Phase 1B, 32 in Phase 2
Chestnut Ridge Court	7	Phase 3B
Courtney Crest Lane	27	Phase 3B
Crab Creek Drive	8	Phase 1A
Dalton Springs Court	14	Phase 1A
Ellisons Cave Lane	3	Phase 3B
Falling Waters Drive	96	56 in Phase 3A, 40 in Phase 3B
Fenney Court	11	Phase 1A
Fern Hammock Drive	33	28 in Phase 1A, 5 in Phase 1B
Fern Hammock Drive North	5	Phase 1B
Fern Hammock Drive West	27	Phase 1B
Florala Court	5	Phase 4
Forest Stump Lane	28	Phase 3A
Ginnie Springs Road	32	Phase 1A
Grassy Hole Court	28	Phase 1B
Green Myrtle Drive	33	Phase 3B
Green Pond Drive	53	Phase 3A
Jamison Court	9	Phase 1A
Kissengen Springs Court	22	Phase 1B
Lake Jessup Drive	28	Phase 1B
Little Springs Court	15	Phase 3A
Lowmoor Way	3	Phase 3A
Magnolia Springs Lane	15	Phase 1A
Magnolia Springs Lane East	17	Phase 1A
Millhopper Road	77	35 in Phase 3A, 42 in Phase 3B
Oleta Way	22	Phase 3B
Palmetto Springs Street	22	Phase 3A
Potter Spring Court	6	Phase 1B
Shadehill Road	40	Phase 4
Silver Glen Drive	28	Phase 1A
Silver Glen Drive East	30	Phase 1B
Silvertip Court	13	Phase 3A
Starbuck Springs Way	29	Phase 1A
Wakulla Springs Road	41	4 in Phase 1A, 37 in Phase 1B
White Tip Road	47	Phase 4
Wind Cave Lane	50	Phase 4
Witherington Lake Court	14	Phase 1A

=== Streets in the Villages of Bartram Springs ===
There are two additional streets in the Villages of Bartram Springs. The entrance to the Villages is located about four tenths of a mile from Racetrack Road, on the western side of Bartram Parkway.

The main street is called Bartram Village Drive, and the second street is called Bartram Village Lane.

== Schools ==
=== Elementary ===
As of fall 2009, all children living in Bartram Springs will attend a new elementary school that is being built inside the development. Ground was broken on August 13 of 2008. The school is located on the East side of the main entrance, about four tenths of a mile in from Racetrack Road. The new School is sized to hold about 800 Kindergarten through 5th grade students. It is named Bartram Springs Elementary, and it will open for its first official day of school on August 24, 2009. The school received an A+ rating for the 2009 school year.

=== Middle school ===
As of fall 2009, students in the 6th through 8th Grades go to Twin Lakes Academy Middle School.

=== High school ===
As of fall 2010, students in the 9th through the 12th Grades go to Atlantic Coast High School.

=== Schools ===
- Bartram Springs Elementary
- Twin Lakes Academy Middle
- Atlantic Coast High

== See also ==
- Neighborhoods of Jacksonville
