= Spring Creek, Wilson County, Tennessee =

Spring Creek, Tennessee
- Ghost town
- Location within Tennessee
- Coordinates: 36°08′56″N 86°14′33″W
- Country: United States
- State: Tennessee
- County: Wilson
- Elevation: 600 ft (180 m)
- GNIS feature ID: 1312885

Spring Creek is a ghost town in Wilson County, Tennessee, United States. Spring Creek was 4.9 miles (7.9 km) south-southeast of Lebanon.
