= Paris Landing State Park =

State park in Tennessee, United States

- Interactive map of Paris Landing State Park
- Type: Tennessee State Park
- Location: Buchanan, Tennessee, United States
- Coordinates: 36.435°N 88.086°W
- Area: 841 acres (3.40 km^{2})
- Created: 1945
- Operator: Tennessee Department of Environment and Conservation
- Open: year round
- Website: Paris Landing State Park

Paris Landing State Park is an 841-acre (3.4 km^{2}) state park located on the western bank of Kentucky Lake in Buchanan, Henry County, Tennessee.

The park is located inland from the original site of Paris Landing which served steamboat traffic on the Tennessee River. The site is now under the waters of Kentucky Lake, which was created by TVA when the Tennessee River was dammed in 1944.

== Amenities ==
Lodging is available at the 91-room lodge, in 10 3-bedroom cabins, 45 campsites with water and electricity and 18 primitive campsites. The lodge contains a restaurant, bar, lounge, gift shop and a conference center. A full-service marina is also located in the park features boat slips, gas and a bait shop.

The marina, along with the spacious lodge and conference center, have played host to dozens of professional crappie and bass tournaments.

=== Golf course ===
The Paris Landing State Park Golf Course is a Par 72, 18-hole course situated on the western shore of Kentucky Lake. The entire course is tree-lined, and therefore provides some privacy screening for players on the course. Several holes skirt the Kentucky Lake, producing a natural balance of rolling land, trees, and water. Through the years Paris Landing has hosted numerous collegiate and high school championships.

The course opened in 1971. In 1994 Hole #12 was redesigned lengthening the hole by approximately 75 to 100 yards and relocating the green to include the vistas of the lake, while greens on Hole #7 and Hole #13 were rebuilt in 1996–1997. Hole #12 is a 586-yard, par 5 with an elevated green again overlooking the Kentucky Lake. The signature hole #4 is a downhill 186-yard par 3 with the Kentucky Lake providing a scenic backdrop.

== Summer activities ==
The park is most often visited in the summer season. Many families use the facilities for various events such as barbecues, picnics, fireworks, recreational activities, etc. On Independence Day, the park is full of visitors there to watch the show of fireworks. The clear setting of the lake provides a beautiful backdrop to the fireworks show. During the summer the pool is open for swimming, as well as the lake. Many boats and fishing equipment can be seen out on the waters in the summer season.
