= Bruce Township =

Bruce Township may refer to:

== Canada ==
- Bruce Township, Ontario

== United States ==
- Bruce Township, LaSalle County, Illinois
- Bruce Township, Benton County, Iowa
- Bruce Township, Chippewa County, Michigan
- Bruce Township, Macomb County, Michigan
- Bruce Township, Minnesota
- Bruce Township, Guilford County, North Carolina, in Guilford County, North Carolina
- Bruce Township, Cavalier County, North Dakota, in Cavalier County, North Dakota
