= Henry County, Tennessee =

County in Tennessee, United States

- County
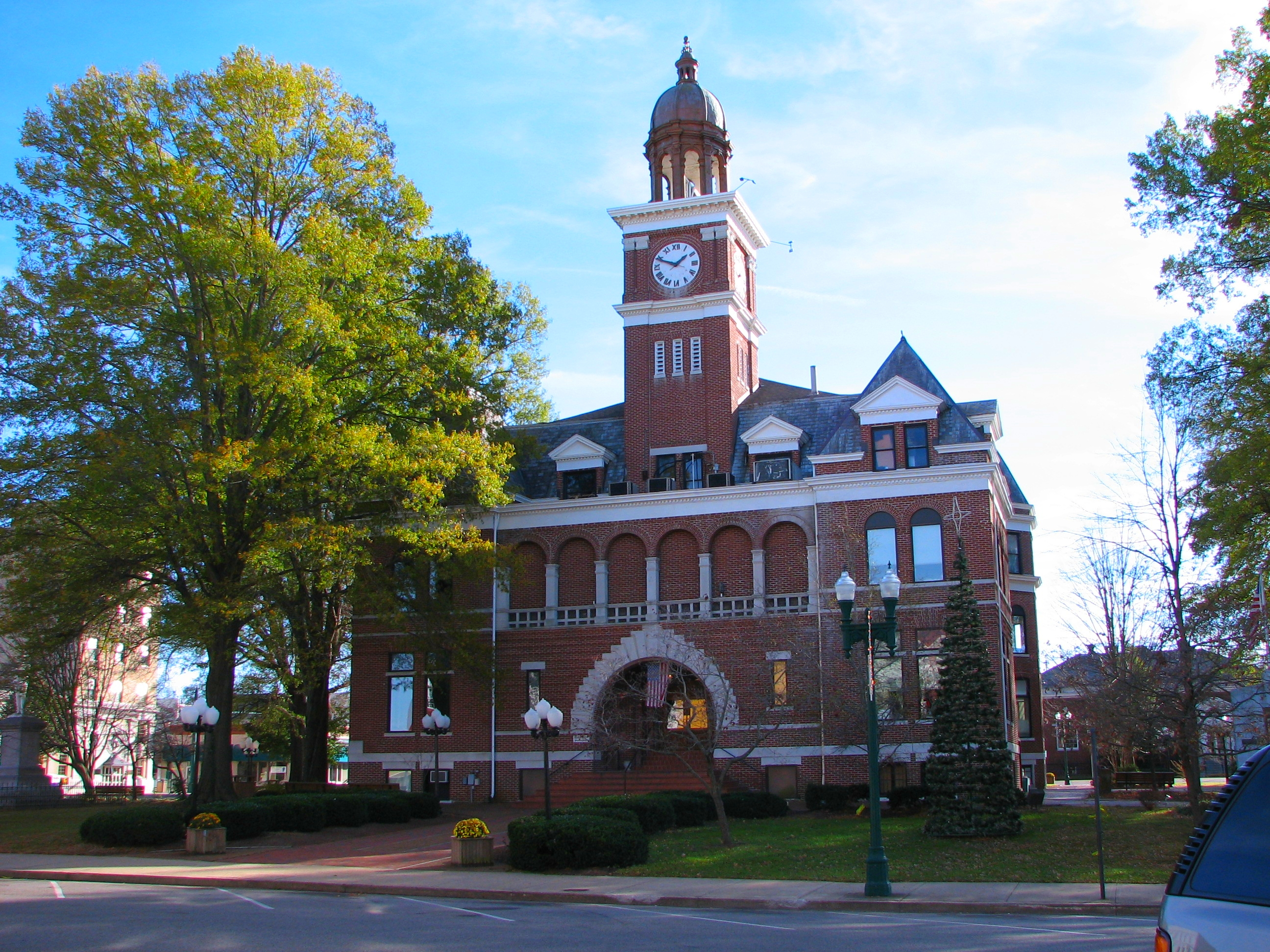
- Henry County Courthouse in Paris

- Flag Seal

- Location within the U.S. state of Tennessee
- Coordinates: 36°20′N 88°18′W
- Country: United States
- State: Tennessee
- Founded: 1821
- Named for: Patrick Henry
- Seat: Paris
- Largest city: Paris

Area
  - Total: 593 sq mi (1,540 km^{2})
  - Land: 562 sq mi (1,460 km^{2})
  - Water: 31 sq mi (80 km^{2}) 5.3%

Population (2020)
  - Total: 32,199
  - Estimate (2025): 32,896 ▲
  - Density: 58/sq mi (22/km^{2})
- Time zone: UTC−6 (Central)
  - Summer (DST): UTC−5 (CDT)
- Congressional district: 8th
- Website: henrycountytn.org

Henry County is a county located on the northwestern border of the U.S. state of Tennessee, and is considered part of West Tennessee. As of the 2020 census, the population was 32,199. Its county seat is Paris. The county is named for the Virginia orator and American Founding Father Patrick Henry.

Henry County comprises the Paris, TN Micropolitan Statistical Area. West Tennessee lands and commodity culture were associated with the lowlands and delta of the Mississippi River, which created fertile areas that supported cotton culture. During the antebellum era, numerous enslaved African Americans provided labor for the cotton plantations.

== Geography ==
According to the U.S. Census Bureau, the county has a total area of 593 square miles (1,540 km^{2}), of which 562 square miles (1,460 km^{2}) are land and 31 square miles (80 km^{2}) (5.3%) are covered by water.

=== Adjacent counties ===
- Calloway County, Kentucky (north)
- Stewart County (northeast)
- Benton County (southeast)
- Carroll County (south)
- Weakley County (west)
- Graves County, Kentucky (northwest)

=== National protected area ===
- Tennessee National Wildlife Refuge (part)

=== State protected areas ===
- Big Sandy Wildlife Management Area (part)
- Holly Fork Wildlife Management Area
- Paris Landing State Park
- West Sandy Wildlife Management Area

== Demographics ==
Historical population
Census	Pop.	Note	%±
1830	12,249		—
1840	14,906		21.7%
1850	18,233		22.3%
1860	19,133		4.9%
1870	20,380		6.5%
1880	22,142		8.6%
1890	21,070		−4.8%
1900	24,208		14.9%
1910	25,434		5.1%
1920	27,151		6.8%
1930	26,432		−2.6%
1940	25,877		−2.1%
1950	23,828		−7.9%
1960	22,275		−6.5%
1970	23,749		6.6%
1980	28,656		20.7%
1990	27,888		−2.7%
2000	31,115		11.6%
2010	32,330		3.9%
2020	32,199		−0.4%
2025 (est.)	32,896	▲	2.2%
U.S. Decennial Census; 1790–1960 1900–1990; 1990–2000 2010–2014

=== 2020 census ===
Henry County racial composition
Race	Num.	Perc.
White (non-Hispanic)	27,250	84.63%
Black or African American (non-Hispanic)	2,307	7.16%
Native American	76	0.24%
Asian	202	0.63%
Pacific Islander	7	0.02%
Other/Mixed	1,480	4.6%
Hispanic or Latino	877	2.72%

As of the 2020 census, the county had a population of 32,199, 13,742 households, and 9,024 families. The median age was 46.9 years. 20.6% of residents were under the age of 18 and 24.0% of residents were 65 years of age or older. For every 100 females there were 95.2 males, and for every 100 females age 18 and over there were 93.2 males age 18 and over.

The racial makeup of the county was 85.5% White, 7.3% Black or African American, 0.3% American Indian and Alaska Native, 0.7% Asian, <0.1% Native Hawaiian and Pacific Islander, 1.3% from some other race, and 5.0% from two or more races. Hispanic or Latino residents of any race comprised 2.7% of the population.

32.2% of residents lived in urban areas, while 67.8% lived in rural areas.

There were 13,742 households in the county, of which 25.9% had children under the age of 18 living in them. Of all households, 46.9% were married-couple households, 18.9% were households with a male householder and no spouse or partner present, and 27.7% were households with a female householder and no spouse or partner present. About 30.4% of all households were made up of individuals and 15.3% had someone living alone who was 65 years of age or older.

There were 16,937 housing units, of which 18.9% were vacant. Among occupied housing units, 72.8% were owner-occupied and 27.2% were renter-occupied. The homeowner vacancy rate was 2.1% and the rental vacancy rate was 7.0%.

=== 2000 census ===
As of the census of 2000, 31,115 people, 13,019 households, and 9,009 families resided in the county. The population density was 55 people per square mile (21 people/km^{2}). The 15,783 housing units averaged 28 per square mile (11/km^{2}). The racial makeup of the county was 89.21% White, 8.96% African American, 0.19% Native American, 0.28% Asian, 0.03% Pacific Islander, 0.39% from other races, and 0.95% from two or more races. About 1.00% of the population was Hispanic or Latino of any race.

Of the 13,019 households, 27.50% had children under the age of 18 living with them, 54.40% were married couples living together, 11.20% had a female householder with no husband present, and 30.80% were not families. About 27.00% of all households were made up of individuals, and 12.80% had someone living alone who was 65 years of age or older. The average household size was 2.35 and the average family size was 2.82.

In the county, the population was distributed as 22.20% under the age of 18, 7.60% from 18 to 24, 26.30% from 25 to 44, 25.70% from 45 to 64, and 18.20% who were 65 years of age or older. The median age was 41 years. For every 100 females, there were 93.40 males. For every 100 females age 18 and over, there were 90.40 males.

The median income for a household in the county was $30,169, and for a family was $35,836. Males had a median income of $27,849 versus $20,695 for females. The per capita income for the county was $15,855. About 10.60% of families and 14.30% of the population were below the poverty line, including 20.10% of those under age 18 and 14.30% of those age 65 or over.

== Media ==
=== Newspaper ===
The Paris Post-Intelligencer

=== Radio stations ===
- WMUF-FM 104.7 "Today's BEST Country"
- WRQR AM 1000 "The Best Classic Rock and Roll"
- FM 97.5 "Your Classic Hits"
- WLZK-FM 104.7 "The Lake - Powerhouse Adult Contemporary"
- WTPR-AM 710 "The Greatest Hits of All Time"
- WTPR-FM 101.7 "The Greatest Hits of All Time"
- WRQR-FM 105.5 "Today's Best Music with Ace & TJ in the Morning"

== Communities ==
=== Cities ===
- McKenzie (mostly in Carroll County and a small portion in Weakley County)
- Paris (county seat)
- Puryear

=== Towns ===
- Cottage Grove
- Henry

=== Census-designated places ===
- Buchanan
- Whitlock

=== Unincorporated communities ===
- Buchanan
- Como
- Mansfield
- Midway (north)
- Midway (south)
- Nobles
- Old Springville
- Spring Creek
- Springville
- Whitlock

== Politics ==
Henry County, like much of West Tennessee, was historically a Democratic stronghold and a center of Confederate sympathy during the Civil War, when it sent more than 2,500 men to the Confederate Army and earned the nickname "Volunteer County of the Volunteer State." After the war the county remained part of the Democratic "Solid South" well into the 20th century. Like much of Tennessee, however, it began to shift toward the Republican Party in the 2000s.

In 2004, George W. Bush flipped Henry County to the Republican column, and it has since become a Republican stronghold. Donald Trump in 2024 received over 77% of the vote.

United States presidential election results for Henry County, Tennessee
Year	Republican		Democratic		Third party(ies)	
Year	No.	%	No.	%	No.	%
1912	941	24.38%	2,526	65.44%	393	10.18%
1916	1,393	31.32%	2,988	67.19%	66	1.48%
1920	1,957	29.50%	4,613	69.55%	63	0.95%
1924	562	17.60%	2,478	77.61%	153	4.79%
1928	1,041	28.04%	2,667	71.83%	5	0.13%
1932	340	10.45%	2,867	88.08%	48	1.47%
1936	470	12.64%	3,223	86.69%	25	0.67%
1940	563	14.49%	3,307	85.10%	16	0.41%
1944	702	18.32%	3,111	81.21%	18	0.47%
1948	604	14.13%	3,292	76.99%	380	8.89%
1952	2,421	29.77%	5,677	69.81%	34	0.42%
1956	2,337	28.97%	5,625	69.72%	106	1.31%
1960	3,033	36.93%	5,049	61.48%	131	1.60%
1964	2,261	27.79%	5,874	72.21%	0	0.00%
1968	2,068	23.89%	3,149	36.38%	3,439	39.73%
1972	4,613	60.61%	2,694	35.40%	304	3.99%
1976	2,585	26.16%	7,162	72.48%	134	1.36%
1980	4,299	38.49%	6,601	59.11%	268	2.40%
1984	5,376	49.61%	5,407	49.89%	54	0.50%
1988	4,784	47.96%	5,138	51.51%	53	0.53%
1992	3,661	30.27%	6,797	56.20%	1,637	13.53%
1996	4,272	37.14%	6,153	53.50%	1,076	9.36%
2000	5,944	48.29%	6,093	49.50%	272	2.21%
2004	7,340	55.70%	5,732	43.50%	105	0.80%
2008	8,182	60.41%	5,153	38.04%	210	1.55%
2012	8,193	64.31%	4,339	34.06%	207	1.62%
2016	9,508	73.45%	3,063	23.66%	374	2.89%
2020	11,239	74.69%	3,548	23.58%	260	1.73%
2024	11,629	77.14%	3,286	21.80%	161	1.07%

== See also ==
- Henry County Courthouse
- National Register of Historic Places listings in Henry County, Tennessee
