= 122nd Illinois Infantry Regiment =

Infantry Regiment of the Union Army

122nd Regiment Illinois Volunteer Infantry
- Illinois state flag
- Active: August 1862 – August 1865
- Country: United States
- Allegiance: Union
- Branch: Infantry
- Engagements: Battle of Parker's Cross Roads; Battle of Paducah; Battle of Fort Blakeley; Battle of Tupelo; Battle of Nashville

The 122nd Regiment Illinois Volunteer Infantry was an Infantry Regiment that served in the Union Army during the American Civil War.

== Campaign History ==
=== Organization ===
The 122nd Illinois was organized at Camp Palmer, Carlinville, Illinois, in August 1862, by Colonel John I. Rinaker, and was mustered into the service of the United States 4 September 1862, with 960 enlisted men.

The regiment remained in camp and was drilled until 8 October, and was then ordered and moved to Columbus, Kentucky. Upon its arrival at that post, it was ordered to go at once to Trenton, Tennessee, and report to General G. M. Dodge. The regiment arrived at Trenton on 12 October and relieved the First Kansas Infantry, Colonel George W. Deitzler. Colonel Rinaker was assigned to the command of the post, and troops at that place, consisting of the One Hundred and Twenty-second Illinois Infantry, Seventh Tennessee Cavalry, Colonel Isaac R. Hawkins commanding; Fourth Illinois Cavalry, and Captain Sparstroms Battery, Second Illinois Artillery.

The regiment continued on duty at Trenton till 12 November 1862, when Colonel Rinaker was ordered to take the right wing of the regiment, companies A, D, and F, and proceed to Humboldt, Tennessee, and relieve the Eighty-first Illinois Infantry, and to take command of the post and troops remaining there, consisting of four companies: Fifty-fourth Illinois Infantry, a part of Fourth Illinois Cavalry, Seventh Wisconsin Battery. This order was at once executed. The remainder of the regiment was left at Trenton under command of Lieutenant Colonel J. F. Drish.

The force at Humboldt was to hold the Mobile and Ohio Railroad from Trenton to Jackson, Tennessee, and guard the ordnance, commissary and quartermaster's supplies stored at that place.

This service was performed until 18 December, when the regiment moved to Jackson to aid in defense of that place against an impending attack thereon by heavy forces of cavalry under lieutenant general Nathan Bedford Forrest. From Jackson, the One Hundred and Twenty-second Regiment, with the Forty-third and Sixty-first Illinois, moved out on 19 December, and had a skirmish with the enemy that day and moved on out to Lexington, Tennessee, and returned to Jackson on 21 December.

Thence moved to Trenton on the 23d of December, and the same night marched in obedience to orders to a point near Humboldt, to protect a force repairing Mobile and Ohio Railroad, which had just been destroyed by rebel cavalry. During the time that the regiment had been about Jackson, the rebel cavalry under Forrest had captured the hospital at Trenton, and had made prisoners of the sick and the guards on duty at Trenton, by which the One Hundred and Twenty-second for the time being lost Major James F. Chapman and Captain B. Cowan, W. W. Freeman, Regimental Quartermaster, and 60 enlisted men taken prisoner.

=== Battle of Parker's Cross Roads ===
On 27 December, nine companies of the One Hundred and Twenty-second, nine companies of Thirty-ninth Iowa Infantry, Fiftieth Indiana Infantry, and a part of Seventh Wisconsin Battery, with three pieces of artillery, and 40 men of Eighteenth Illinois Infantry, the latter mounted, whole under command of Colonel Cyrus L. Dunham, Fiftieth Indiana, marched from Trenton to head off the cavalry force under Forrest then moving back from near Columbus, Kentucky, toward the Tennessee River. Moved by way of Huntingdon, Tennessee, and on 30 December a skirmish occurred with the enemy, and on 31 December 1862, at about 11 A.M., the One Hundred and Twenty-second and Fiftieth Indiana and the 40 men of the Eighteenth Illinois Infantry, and a part of the Seventh Wisconsin Battery, constituting a force of 1,540 men, engaged in battle with the enemy under Forrest, numbering over 6,000 men with eighteen pieces of artillery. The fight continued till about 2 o'clock P.M., when the enemy fell back leaving the field in possession of the little force that had fought them for nearly three hours, and had during that time captured eight pieces of artillery and 500 prisoners, among them Major Strange, Forrest's Adjutant General. The losses of the One Hundred and Twenty-second Regiment in killed were 22 enlisted and 1 officer, Lieutenant Bristow, in wounded 56 enlisted men and 2 officers, Colonel Rinaker, who received a severe wound in his right leg, and Captain William B. Dugger; one man missing, making a total loss of 80 men.

On 31 January 1863, the regiment returned to Trenton, Tennessee, and remained there on duty till 17 February, when it moved to Corinth, Mississippi, and was assigned to the First Brigade, Second Division, XVI Corps, Colonel Mersy, of Ninth Illinois, commanding Brigade, General Sweeney commanding Division; General Dodge commanding left wing of the XVI Corps. The Brigade was composed of Ninth, Twelfth, Sixty-sixth and One Hundred and Twenty-second Illinois, and Eighty-first Ohio Infantry.

=== Battle of Paducah ===
From 15 to 25 April, the regiment took part in expedition to Major Strange, and was engaged with a rebel force at Town Creek, Alabama. The regiment was there commanded by Lieutenant Colonel Drish. 25 June, Mersy's Brigade was put in charge of Memphis and Charleston Railroad, from Corinth, Mississippi, to Grand Junction. The One Hundred and Twenty-second had that part from Middleton, Tennessee, to Grand Junction: headquarters of the One Hundred and Twenty-second at Saulsbury, Tennessee. During the ensuing months till 30 October 1863, the men were constantly on duty and often engaged in skirmishes with cavalry forces of the enemy threatening the railroad. Colonel Rinaker was in command of the post at Saulsbury and of the forces at that post, consisting of a part of One Hundred and Twenty-second Regiment, the Eleventh Illinois Cavalry and the Seventh Tennessee Cavalry. On 30 October, the regiment moved from Saulsbury to Corinth, thence on 1 November, to Iuka, Mississippi. Colonel Rinaker was assigned to the command of post. On 5 November, the regiment moved with the rest of the right wing, XVI Corps, to Eastport, Mississippi. At that point the One Hundred and Twenty-second was left in charge of that place. A depot of supplies was established there. Colonel Rinaker was assigned to the command of the post and troops, consisting of the First New Jersey Cavalry, Thirty-fourth and Thirty-fifth New Jersey Infantry, and Seventeenth and One Hundred and Seventy-eighth New York Regiment of Infantry. The regiment remained at Eastport till 8 December 1863, when it moved to Paducah, Kentucky, and thence on 19 January 1864, to Cairo, Illinois, Colonel Rinaker being assigned to the command of the post. On 24 March 1864, a considerable rebel force under Forrest attacked Paducah, and three companies of the One Hundred and Twenty-second, E, H and K, took part in the defense, and aided in repelling the enemy in the three several assaults they made on Fort Anderson at that place.

26 June 1864, the regiment after the defeat of Sturgis at Guntown, Mississippi, was ordered to join the command of General A. J. Smith, then at LaGrange, Tennessee. Smith's command at that time was the right wing of the XVI Corps. The regiment proceeded via Memphis, Tennessee, and on the 3d of July 1864, reported to General A. J. Smith at LaGrange, and was assigned to the First Brigade, Second Division.

On 4 July, the command started on the march for Okolona, Mississippi, for the purpose of attacking the force then concentrating at that place under the command of Lieutenant General S. D. Lee, of the Confederate army. Cavalry skirmishing took place every day. The march was long, toilsome, the weather was hot; many cases of sun stroke occurred.

=== Battle of Tupelo ===
On the 11th the command reached Pontotoc, Mississippi, remained there till the 13th. Then the regiment with the rest of the command marched to the village of Tupelo, and thus turned the right flank of the fortified position of the rebels in front of Okolona, compelling them to come out and attack us at Tupelo. On 14 July, about 9 o'clock A.M., the enemy, under General S. D. Lee, came forward in fine style and attacked General Smith's command posted in the rear of a crest of a ridge fronted by an open field, across which the rebels had to come. The One Hundred and Twenty-second was stationed with its right just covering the road leading into Tupelo. As the enemy advanced across the open plain, covered by a heavy artillery fire, the One Hundred and Twenty-second and the rest of the Brigade moved forward from the opposite side, and met the enemy just at the crest of the ridge, and opened a destructive fire upon them with such effect that their ranks were shattered and the whole force driven back with heavy loss in men and officers. Three times the assault was repeated and repulsed with equally disastrous results to the rebel force. At about 2 P.M., the enemy discomfited, withdrew, leaving the Union forces masters of the field, and in possession of the rebel dead. The losses of the One Hundred Twenty-second were 10 killed and 33 wounded. Among the killed was Captain Burrough, of Company K. Lieutenant J. M. Valentine, of Company A, was severely wounded.

The regiment with the rest of the command returned to Memphis on the 23d of July 1864.

Again on 4 August the regiment marched from Memphis, with the rest of General Smith's command, for Holly Springs, where after being detained a few days, the force moved on to Oxford, Mississippi. Near Abbeville they had a skirmish with the enemy without serious results to the regiment. Reached Oxford only to find that the enemy had fallen back still farther.

Thence marched back to Memphis, reaching there on 31 August.

On 8 September, took boats for Cairo, Illinois, thence to Jefferson Barracks, Missouri.

Thence marched to Ironton, Missouri, to meet a rebel force under General Sterling Price. Price turned aside and Thence had to return. Then he marched into Western Missouri, in the vain attempt to meet the same rebel force. This march covered the distance of 700 miles going and returning to and from the vicinity of Kansas City. It was March and the weather was cold with rough and frozen ground. Consequently, the shoes of the soldiers were worn out.

=== Battle of Nashville ===
Upon the return of the command to St. Louis on 18 November 1864, the men were supplied with new shoes and clothing. Then the command of General A. J. Smith was ordered to go to the defense of Nashville, Tennessee. This command then consisted of three Divisions of Infantry, and was called the "Detachment Army of the Tennessee". The One Hundred and Twenty-second Regiment proceeded to Nashville, where, on 15 and 16 December 1864, it took part in the battle of Nashville, capturing four pieces of artillery and a battle flag from the enemy; and losing in killed and wounded 26 men. The conduct of the regiment in this battle was commended specially in the report of General Garrard, the Division command. The regiment was commanded in the battle by Lieutenant Colonel James F. Drish. The regiment took part in the pursuit of General Hood's Army from Nashville to Eastport, Miss.

Thence on 18 February with residue of the Detachment of the Army of the Tennessee, under General A. J. Smith, proceeded to New Orleans, Louisiana, arriving there in February. At that place other troops were added to the command, and it became thenceforth the SVI Corps, Army of the Tennessee.

=== Battle of Fort Blakeley ===
On 6 March the One Hundred and Twenty-second Regiment with the One Hundred and Nineteenth Illinois, Twenty-first Missouri Infantry, Eighty-ninth Indiana, constituting First Brigade, Second Division, XVI Army Corps, and Fifty-eighth Illinois, under command of Colonel Rinaker, went by ocean steamer to Dauphin Island, Alabama, near mouth of Mobile Bay. On the 23d of March, moved thence with the rest of the XVI Corps to assist in the investment of rebel fortifications at Blakely and Spanish Fort, these constituting the eastern defenses of Mobile. And on 9 April 1865, it occupied the center of the line formed by the First Brigade, General Garrard's Division, XVI Corps of the Army of the Tennessee, in the assault upon the rebel works at Blakely, and materially aided in capturing that place. The Brigade captured 10 pieces of artillery and the rebel General's headquarters, a number of rebel flags, and several hundreds of prisoners, among them Generals Liddell and Thomas and their staff officers. The regiment was commanded by Lieutenant Colonel Drish, who was seriously wounded by a piece of shell. The losses of the regiment were 20 men killed and wounded. Colonel Rinaker commanded the Brigade in the charge as he had done for a considerable time previous thereto. The regiment with the rest of the XVI Corps on 12 April, left Blakely and marched thence to Montgomery, Alabama, arriving there on the 26th of that month.

=== Muster Out ===
On 5 June, the regiment returned to Mobile, Alabama, and on 15 July it was mustered out, and proceeded thence to Springfield, Illinois, where it was paid off and finally discharged at Camp Butler on 4 August 1865.

Colonel John I Rinaker was promoted brevet brigadier general 13 March 1865, for meritorious service.

== Total strength and casualties ==
Regiment lost during service 2 Officers and 38 Enlisted men killed and mortally wounded and 121 Enlisted men by disease. Total 161.

== Recipients of the Congressional Medal of Honor ==
- Private John H. Callahan, Company B, Battle of Fort Blakeley
- Private George Stokes, Company C, Battle of Nashville

== Regimental organization ==
The officers of the 122nd were as follows:

=== Staff ===
==== Commander ====
- Colonel John I. Rinaker (WIA)

==== Field and Staff ====
- Lieutenant Colonel James F. Drish
- Major James F. Chapman (POW)
- Adjutant Harding G. Kaplinger
- Regimental Quartermaster William W. Freeman (POW)
- Surgeon William A. Knox
- First Assistant Surgeon John P. Mathews
- Second Assistant Surgeon Marinus W. Seaman
- Chaplain John H. Austin

=== Companies ===
==== Company A ====
- Captain William B. Dugger (WIA)
- First Lieutenant Arthur D. Comer
- First Lieutenant Thomas G. Lofton
- Second Lieutenant David B. Halderman
- Second Lieutenant James M. Valentine (WIA)

==== Company B ====
- Captain Manoah Bostick
- First Lieutenant John Harding
- Second Lieutenant Eli H. Davis

==== Company C ====
- Captain Lucian King
- First Lieutenant Jacob L. Pope
- Second Lieutenant Samuel C. Chapman

==== Company D ====
- Captain Lewis P. Peebles
- First Lieutenant Henry C. Gooding
- First Lieutenant James N. Holt
- Second Lieutenant John F. Roach

==== Company E ====
- Captain Baxter Haynes
- Captain Abraham C. Hulse
- First Lieutenant Thornton G. Capps
- First Lieutenant Benjamin V. Carey

==== Company F ====
- Captain James S. Chiles
- Captain Sidney Hall
- Second Lieutenant Alvis Sharp

==== Company G ====
- Captain Balfour Cowan (POW)
- First Lieutenant William H. Cox
- Second Lieutenant Rufus W. Loud

==== Company H ====
- Captain Benjamin Leigh
- First Lieutenant James C. McKnight
- Second Lieutenant Pleasant L. Bristow (KIA)

==== Company I ====
- Captain Andrew T. Duncan
- First Lieutenant Stephen T. Sawyer
- Second Lieutenant Augustus M. Sparks

==== Company K ====
- Captain Josiah Borough (KIA)
- Captain John S. Cotter
- Second Lieutenant Thomas Miller

== See also ==
- List of Illinois Civil War Units
- Illinois in the American Civil War
