= John Fuller =

John Fuller may refer to:

== Politics ==
- John Fuller (Massachusetts politician), representative to the Great and General Court
- John Fuller (died 1744), British member of parliament for Plympton Erle, 1728–1734
- John Fuller (1680–1745), British member of parliament for Sussex, 1713–1715
- John Fuller (1706–1755), British member of parliament for Boroughbridge, 1754–1755
- John Fuller (1732–1804), British member of parliament for Tregony, 1754–1761
- Mad Jack Fuller (John Fuller, 1757–1834), English politician, philanthropist and patron of the arts, and Squire of the hamlet of Brightling
- Sir John Fuller, 1st Baronet (1864–1915), British Liberal politician and Governor of Victoria
- John Fuller (Australian politician) (1917–2009), New South Wales minister in the Robert Askin government
- John Fuller (Montana politician), member of the Montana House of Representatives
- John Fuller, Baron Fuller (born 1968), British Conservative Party councillor and life peer

== Military ==
- John W. Fuller (1827–1891), Union general
- J. F. C. Fuller (John Frederick Charles Fuller, 1876–1966), British soldier
- John Augustus Fuller (1828–1902), British Army officer
- John V. Fuller (born 1965), United States Navy admiral

== Arts ==
- John G. Fuller (1913–1990), New England–based American author
- John Fuller (poet) (born 1937), English poet and author
- Johnny Fuller (musician) (1929–1985), American blues singer and guitarist
- Jack Fuller, author and former editor and publisher of the Chicago Tribune
- John Fuller (singer) (1850–1923), New Zealand singer and theatrical company manager
- John Fuller (theatrical entrepreneur) (1879–1959), his son, New Zealand theatrical entrepreneur

== Sports ==
- Johnny Fuller (American football) (born 1946), American football player
- John Fuller (baseball) (born 1950), Major League baseball player
- John Fuller (cricketer) (1834–1893), English cricketer, clergyman and academic
- John Fuller (rugby union), Australian international rugby union player

== Others ==
- John Fuller (college head) (died 1558/9), master of Jesus College, Cambridge
- John Fuller (bushranger) (1830–1865), Australian bushranger
- John L. Fuller (1910–1992), behavior geneticist
- John Doc Fuller, prison coach, motivational speaker and author
- John Fuller (surgeon), Scottish surgeon and historian
