= 50th Indiana Infantry Regiment =

Union Army regiment in the American Civil War

50th Regiment Indiana Infantry
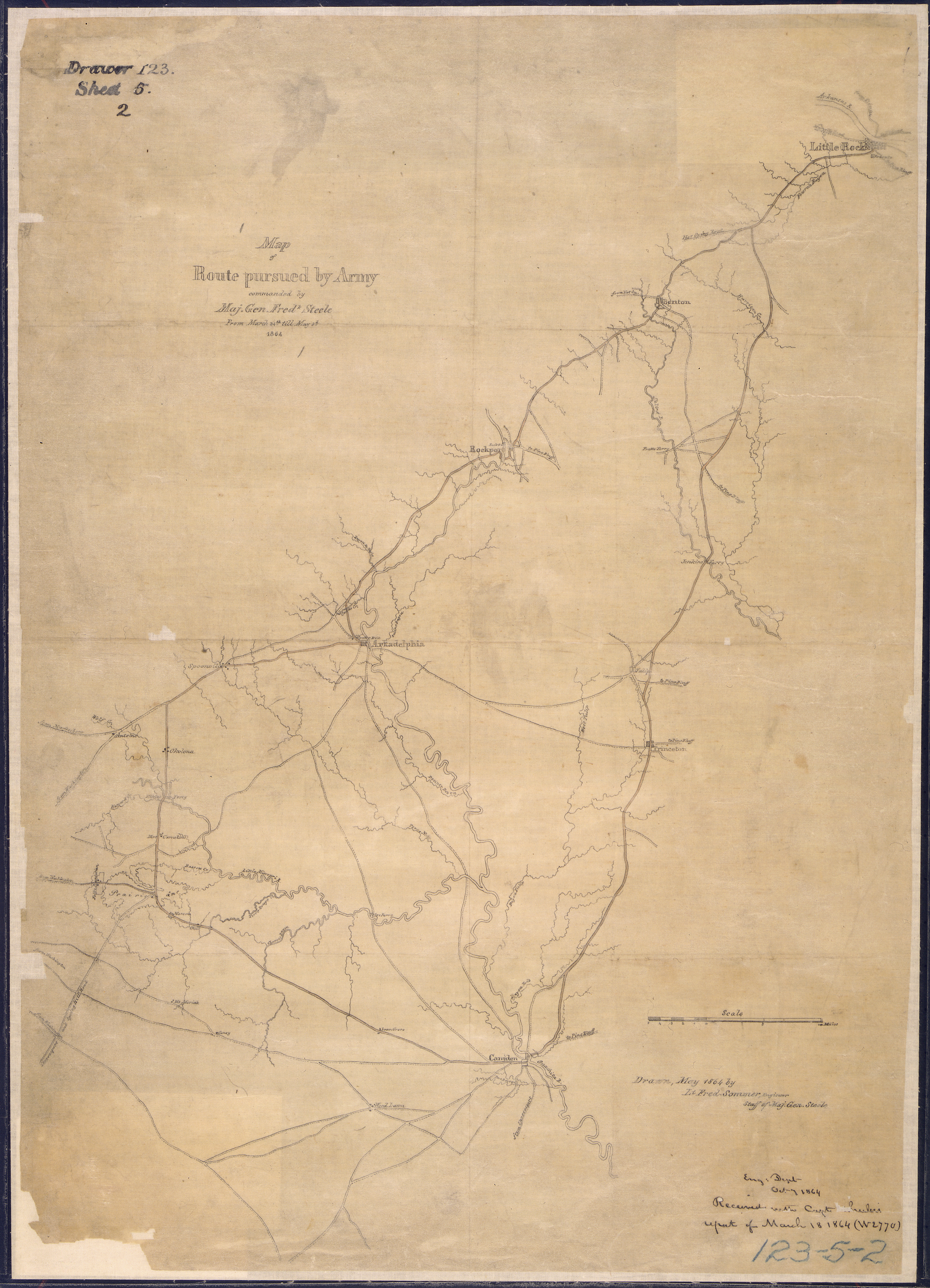
- An 1864 map of Steele's Camden Expedition route in Arkansas, one of the regiment's campaigns
- Active: September 12, 1861 – May 25, 1865
- Country: United States
- Allegiance: Union
- Branch: Infantry
- Equipment: Enfield rifle French rifles
- Engagements: Battle of Munfordville; Battle of Parker's Cross Roads; Capture of Little Rock; Camden Expedition; Battle of Jenkins' Ferry; Mobile Campaign; Battle of Fort Blakeley

Commanders
- Notable commanders: Colonel Cyrus L. Dunham; Colonel Samuel T. Wells

The 50th Regiment Indiana Infantry was an infantry regiment from Indiana that served in the Union Army during the American Civil War. Organized at Seymour in September 1861, it served principally in the Western Theater. Five of its companies were captured at the September 1862 surrender of Munfordville, Kentucky; after being paroled and exchanged, the reunited regiment fought Nathan Bedford Forrest's cavalry at the Battle of Parker's Crossroads in December 1862. It later took part in Steele's expeditions in Arkansas—including the Battle of Jenkins' Ferry in 1864—and in the Mobile campaign of 1865, helping to capture Fort Blakely. The regiment was consolidated into the 52nd Indiana Infantry Regiment on May 25, 1865.

== Organization ==
The 50th Indiana was organized at Camp Heffren in Seymour and mustered into federal service for a three-year enlistment on September 12, 1861. Its men were drawn from Seymour and surrounding counties of southern Indiana; after leaving Seymour on October 25, 1861, the regiment marched to New Albany by way of Jackson, Lawrence, Orange, Washington, and Floyd counties, enlisting additional recruits along the route. At its organization the regiment's field and staff officers were Colonel Cyrus L. Dunham, a former Indiana Secretary of State; Lieutenant Colonel Horace Heffren; Major Banister Compton; Quartermaster Henry C. Houston; Surgeon J. R. Monroe; and Chaplain William H. Jackson. Armed with Enfield and French rifles, the regiment was ordered into Kentucky in December 1861. Enough of the regiment's men reenlisted as veterans in March 1864 for it to remain in the field.

== Service ==
From New Albany the regiment moved into Kentucky, reaching Bardstown in December 1861 and advancing on Bowling Green and Nashville in February–March 1862. Through the summer it guarded the Louisville and Nashville Railroad, took part in operations against John Hunt Morgan's cavalry in July, and skirmished at Pilot Knob, Drake's Creek, and Mansker's Creek in August.

In September 1862 five companies (A, B, D, F, and H) were caught up in the siege and surrender of Munfordville, Kentucky, and were captured on September 17. That same month Lieutenant Colonel Horace Heffren resigned his commission, and Samuel T. Wells was promoted to succeed him. The prisoners were paroled and sent to Indianapolis until exchanged that November.

Reunited, the regiment moved to Jackson, Tennessee, and from December 1862 into January 1863 joined operations against Nathan Bedford Forrest in western Tennessee, seeing action at Huntingdon, Clarksburg, and the Battle of Parker's Cross Roads (December 30–31). It then performed garrison duty at Jackson, Collierville, and Memphis until August 1863.

Transferred to Arkansas, the 50th joined Steele's expedition that captured Little Rock, fighting at Bayou Fourche on September 10, 1863, and then garrisoned Lewisburg, Arkansas. After most of the men reenlisted as veterans in March 1864, the regiment took part in the Camden Expedition, engaged at Terre Noir Creek, Prairie D'Ane, Camden, and the Battle of Jenkins' Ferry on the Saline River (April 30), before returning to duty around Little Rock through the rest of 1864.

In February 1865 the regiment moved to Mobile Point, Alabama, for the Mobile Campaign, taking part in the sieges of Spanish Fort and Fort Blakely, the assault that carried Fort Blakely on April 9, and the capture of Mobile on April 12. It marched to Montgomery later that month and was consolidated into the 52nd Indiana Infantry Regiment on May 25, 1865.

=== Brigade assignments ===
The regiment was attached to the following commands:

- 15th Brigade, 4th Division, Army of the Ohio (to June 1862)
- Unassigned railroad guard, Army of the Ohio (to September 1862)
- District of Louisville, Kentucky, Department of the Ohio (to November 1862)
- District of Jackson, Tennessee, XIII Corps, Department of the Tennessee (to December 1862)
- 2nd Brigade, District of Jackson, XVI Corps (to March 1863)
- 2nd Brigade, 3rd Division, XVI Corps (to August 1863)
- True's Brigade, Arkansas Expedition (to January 1864)
- 2nd Division, VII Corps, Department of Arkansas (to April 1864)
- 1st Brigade, 3rd Division, VII Corps (to May 1864)
- 1st Brigade, 1st Division, VII Corps (to February 1865)
- 2nd Brigade, 3rd Division, XIII Corps, Military Division of West Mississippi (to April 1865)
- 2nd Brigade, 2nd Division, XVI Corps, Military Division of West Mississippi (to May 1865)

== Casualties ==
The regiment lost a total of 218 men during service: 3 officers and 54 enlisted men killed or mortally wounded, and 3 officers and 158 enlisted men died of disease.

== Commanders ==
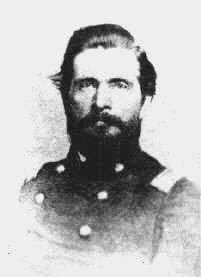
Colonel Cyrus L. Dunham, the regiment's first commander

- Colonel Cyrus L. Dunham, a former Indiana Secretary of State, organized the regiment and commanded it until 1863, when he left amid accusations of disloyalty following his surrender at Munfordville; accounts differ as to whether he was cashiered or honorably discharged upon resignation.
- Lieutenant Colonel Horace Heffren (1832–1883), for whom the regiment's organizing camp at Seymour was named, served as Dunham's second-in-command until his resignation in September 1862. A War Democrat, he later won a seat in the Indiana legislature and became a leader of the Copperhead Order of the Sons of Liberty; arrested in the 1864 Indianapolis treason trials alongside Lambdin P. Milligan, he avoided prosecution by turning state's evidence.
- Colonel Samuel T. Wells, of Vallonia—sheriff of Jackson County from 1846 to 1847 and later a member of the Indiana legislature—enlisted as a captain in Company A in 1861 and rose through major (March 1862) and lieutenant colonel (September 1862) to colonel (commissioned November 1863). He commanded the regiment from 1863, leading it through the Mobile campaign until its consolidation into the 52nd Indiana in May 1865.
- Other field officers who rose to field rank during the regiment's service included Horace Newland Attkisson (1828–1875), a Salem native who advanced from captain of Company C to major, and John Hungate.

== See also ==
- List of Indiana Civil War regiments
- Indiana in the Civil War
