= Cyrus L. Dunham =

American politician (1817–1877)

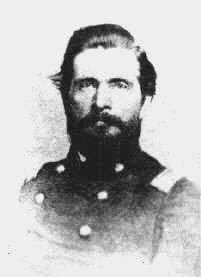
- Dunham in 1862

Member of the U.S. House of Representatives from Indiana
- In office March 4, 1849 – March 3, 1855
- Preceded by: Thomas J. Henley (2nd); John L. Robinson (3rd)
- Succeeded by: William H. English (2nd); George G. Dunn (3rd)
- Constituency: 2nd district (1849-53); 3rd district (1853-55)

Secretary of State of Indiana
- In office 1858–1861
- Governor: Ashbel P. Willard; Abram A. Hammond
- Preceded by: Daniel McClure
- Succeeded by: William A. Peele

Personal details
- Born: Cyrus Livingston Dunham; January 16, 1817 Dryden, New York, U.S.
- Died: November 21, 1877 (aged 60) Jeffersonville, Indiana, U.S.
- Resting place: Walnut Ridge Cemetery, Jeffersonville, Indiana
- Party: Democratic
- Military career
- Allegiance: United States
- Branch: Union Army
- Service years: 1861–1863
- Rank: Colonel
- Commands: 50th Indiana Infantry Regiment
- Conflicts: Battle of Munfordville; Battle of Parker's Cross Roads

Cyrus Livingston Dunham (January 16, 1817 – November 21, 1877) was an attorney, soldier, and prominent Indiana politician, serving most notably as a U.S. representative from Indiana from 1849 to 1855.

== Biography ==
Born in Dryden, New York in 1817, Dunham attended public schools and eventually taught school. After earning a law degree and being admitted to the Bar, he moved to Salem, Indiana in 1841 and began practicing law. Dunham was elected prosecuting attorney of Washington County, Indiana in 1845 and then served as a member of the Indiana State House of Representatives for one term from 1846 to 1847.

Dunham then successfully ran for Congress, being elected to the Thirty-first, Thirty-second, and Thirty-third Congresses (March 4, 1849 – March 3, 1855) as a Democrat. He served as chairman of the Committee on Roads and Canals during the Thirty-third Congress. After his time in Congress, he was appointed by Governor Ashbel P. Willard as Secretary of State of Indiana, serving from 1858 to 1861.

== Civil War ==
Having moved from Salem to Jackson County during the 1850s, Dunham organized the 50th Indiana Infantry Regiment at Seymour and was commissioned its colonel on December 1, 1861. His conduct soon drew criticism; a May 1862 dispatch in The New York Times reported that Unionists in his own regiment and the local press accused him of "disloyal sympathies, squinting at treason, [and] neglecting his duty," and predicted he would "be cashiered" if he could not clear himself. That September, five companies of the regiment were captured in the surrender of Munfordville, Kentucky.

In September 1862, Dunham and five companies of the 50th were among the Union forces besieged at Munfordville, Kentucky, by Braxton Bragg's army. As the senior colonel present, Dunham superseded Colonel John T. Wilder in command of the garrison on September 14, but two days later Brigadier General Charles C. Gilbert relieved and arrested him and restored Wilder, who surrendered the surrounded post on September 17; the five companies were among some 4,000 men captured. A Cincinnati Gazette correspondent reported that Dunham, after his arrest, "immediately proceeded to get very drunk" and remained so until the surrender.

In late December 1862, Dunham led a Federal brigade of about 1,500 men against Nathan Bedford Forrest's raiding cavalry in western Tennessee. At the Battle of Parker's Cross Roads on December 31, his outnumbered command held off Forrest for several hours; by later accounts, when Forrest demanded his surrender, Dunham refused, sending word that he "never surrender[ed]." Nearly surrounded, his troops were relieved by the arrival of Colonel John W. Fuller's brigade, which struck Forrest's rear and drove the Confederates from the field.

Dunham left the regiment in 1863; his service record shows an honorable discharge on November 4, 1863, although accounts of his departure differ.

Dunham's nephew, Horace Heffren, served as the regiment's lieutenant colonel and his second-in-command.

== Later life and career ==
After the war Dunham was again elected to the Indiana State House of Representatives, serving a term from 1864 to 1865. As an attorney he defended some of the notorious Reno Gang members at Brownstown, Indiana; he was also rumored to have shipped the skulls of two criminals hanged by vigilantes in the town to New York City. He married Malvina B. Markwell on January 6, 1870, and from 1871 to 1874 served as judge of the criminal court of Floyd and Clark counties, afterward residing in Jeffersonville and resuming his law practice. A contemporary obituary recalled Dunham as a man of "brilliant intellect and superior oratorical powers" whose promise was undercut by an "appetite for strong drink" that "destroyed his popularity and influence," though in his final years he had "struggled hard for reformation."

U.S. House of Representatives
Preceded by Thomas J. Henley	Member of the U.S. House of Representatives from Indiana's 2nd congressional district 1849–1853	Succeeded by William H. English
Preceded by John L. Robinson	Member of the U.S. House of Representatives from Indiana's 3rd congressional district 1853–1855	Succeeded by George G. Dunn
Political offices
Preceded by Daniel McClure	Secretary of State of Indiana; 1858–1861	Succeeded by William A. Peele
