= Advertising campaign =

Advertisements based on a theme

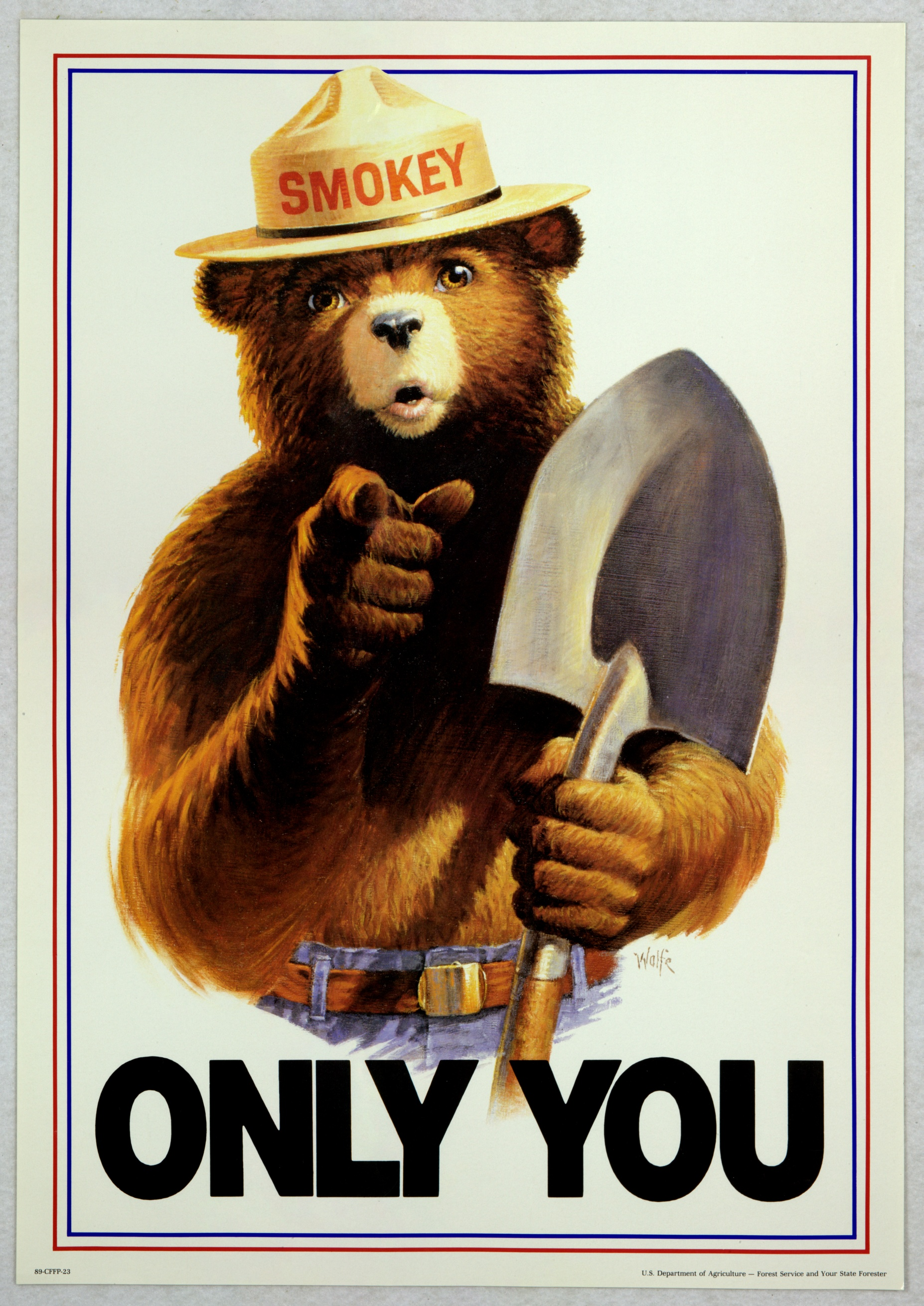
Smokey Bear is the icon of the U.S. Forest Service's long-running campaign against wildfires.

An advertising campaign or marketing campaign is a series of advertisement messages that share a single idea and theme which make up an integrated marketing communication (IMC). An IMC is a platform in which a group of people can group their ideas, beliefs, and concepts into one large media base. Advertising campaigns utilize diverse media channels over a particular time frame and target identified audiences.

The campaign theme is the central message that will be received in the promotional activities and is the prime focus of the advertising campaign, as it sets the motif for the series of individual advertisements and other marketing communications that will be used. The campaign themes are usually produced with the objective of being used for a significant period but many of them are temporal due to factors like being not effective or market conditions, competition and marketing mix.

Advertising campaigns are built to accomplish a particular objective or a set of objectives. Such objectives usually include establishing a brand, raising brand awareness, and aggrandizing the rate of conversions/sales. The rate of success or failure in accomplishing these goals is reckoned via effectiveness measures. There are 5 key points that an advertising campaign must consider to ensure an effective campaign. These points are, integrated marketing communications, media channels, positioning, the communications process diagram and touch points.

== Integrated marketing communication ==
Integrated marketing communication (IMC) is a conceptual approach used by the majority of organizations to develop a strategic plan on how they are going to broadcast their marketing and advertising campaigns. Recently there has been a shift in the way marketers and advertisers interact with their consumers and now see it as a conversation between marketing/advertising teams and consumers. IMC has emerged as a key strategy for organizations to manage customer experiences in the digital age, since organizations can communicate with people in more ways than those typically thought of as media. The more traditional advertising practices such as newspapers, billboards, and magazines are still used but fail to have the same effect now as they did in previous years. Current research shows that no other form of commercial communication shares the same essential elements as the mobile forms, making it unique in its advertising impact.

The importance of the IMC is to make the marketing process seamless for both the brand and the consumer. IMC attempts to meld all aspects of marketing into one cohesive piece. This includes sales promotion, advertising, public relations, direct marketing, and social media. The entire point of IMC is to have all of these aspects of marketing work together as a unified force. This can be done through methods, channels, and activities all while using a media platform. The end goal of IMC is to get the brand's message across to consumers in the most convenient way possible.

The advantage of using IMC is that it can communicate the same message through several channels to create brand awareness. IMC is the most cost-effective solution when compared to mass media advertising to interact with target consumers on a personal level. IMC also benefits small businesses, as they are able to submerge their consumers with communication of various kinds in a way that pushes them through the research and buying stages creating a relationship and dialogue with their new customer. Popular and obvious examples of IMC put into action are the likes of direct marketing to the consumer that the organization already has a knowledge that the person is interested in the brand by gathering personal information about them from when they previously shopped there and then sending mail, emails, texts and other direct communication with the person. In-store sales promotions are tactics such as '30% off' sales or offering loyalty cards to consumers to build a relationship. Television and radio advertisements are also a form of advertising strategy derived from IMC. All of the components of IMC play an important role and a company may or may not choose to implement any of the integration strategies.

== Media channels ==
Media channels, also known as marketing communications channels, are used to create a connection with the target consumer and influence the behavior. Traditional methods of communication with the consumer include newspapers, magazines, radio, television, billboards, telephone, post, and door to door sales. These are just a few of the historically traditional methods.

Along with traditional media channels, there are new and emerging media channels. Social media has begun to play a significant role in the way media and marketing combine to reach a consumer base. Social media can reach a wider audience. Depending on age group and demographic, social media can influence a company's overall image. Using social media as a marketing tool has become a widely popular branding method. A brand can create an entire social media presence based around its specific target.

With advancements in digital communications channels, marketing communications allow for the possibility of two-way communications where an immediate consumer response can be elicited. Digital communications tools include: websites, blogs, social media, email, mobile, and search engines as a few examples. It is important for an advertising campaign to carefully select channels based on where their target consumer spends time to ensure market and advertising efforts are maximized. Marketing professionals should also consider the cost of reaching its target audience and the time (i.e. advertising during the holiday season tends to be more expensive).

== Modern day implications for the advantages & disadvantages of traditional media channels ==
In the rapidly changing marketing and advertising environment, exposure to certain consumer groups and target audiences through traditional media channels has blurred. These traditional media channels are defined as print, broadcast, out-of-home and direct mail. The introduction of various new modern-day media channels has altered their traditional advantages and disadvantages. It is imperative to the effectiveness of the Integrated Marketing Communication (IMC) strategy that exposure to certain demographics, consumer groups and target audiences is anticipated to provide clarity, consistency, and maximum communications impact.

=== Print media ===
Print media is mainly defined as newspapers and magazines. With the transition in around 2006 – 2016 to digital information on phones, computers and tablets, the main demographic that is still exposed to traditional print media is older. It is also estimated that there will be a reduction of print material in the coming years, as print media moves online. Advertisers need to consider this; in some cases, they could use this to their advantage. The advantages of newspaper advertising are that it is low cost, timely, the reader controls exposure, and it provides moderate coverage to the older generations in western society. Disadvantages are the aging demographic, short life, clutter and that it attracts less attention. Magazines are similar in some cases, but as they are a niche product they increase segmentation potential; they also have high information content and longevity. Disadvantages are that they are visual only, they lack flexibility and a long lead time for advertisement placement.

=== Broadcast media ===
Traditional broadcast media's primary platforms are television and radio. These are still relatively prominent in modern-day society, but with the emergence of online content such as YouTube and Instagram, it would be difficult to anticipate where the market is headed in the next decade. Television's advantages are that it has mass coverage, high reach, quality reputation, low post per exposure and impacts human senses. Disadvantages would be that it has low selectivity, short message life and high production costs. Alternatively, radio offers flexibility, high frequency and low advertising and production costs. Disadvantages to radio are that its audio only, low attention-getting and short message.

=== Out-of-home (OOH) media ===
Out of Home (OOH) marketing is a broad concept that has expanded beyond large, static billboards on motorways. Current and innovative OOH approaches include street furniture, aerial blimps and digital OOH. As the world changes, new ways emerges to revitalize this media channel. Its potential advantages are accessibility and reach, geographic flexibility and relatively low cost. Disadvantages to OOH media are that it has a short life, is difficult to measure/control and can convey a poor brand image.

Direct mail consists of messages sent directly to consumers through the mail delivery service. It is one of the more "dated" media channels. In the modern day it has few advantages, except that it can be highly selective, and has high information content. Disadvantages are that it promotes a poor brand image ("junk mail") and has a high cost-to-contact ratio.

== Target market ==
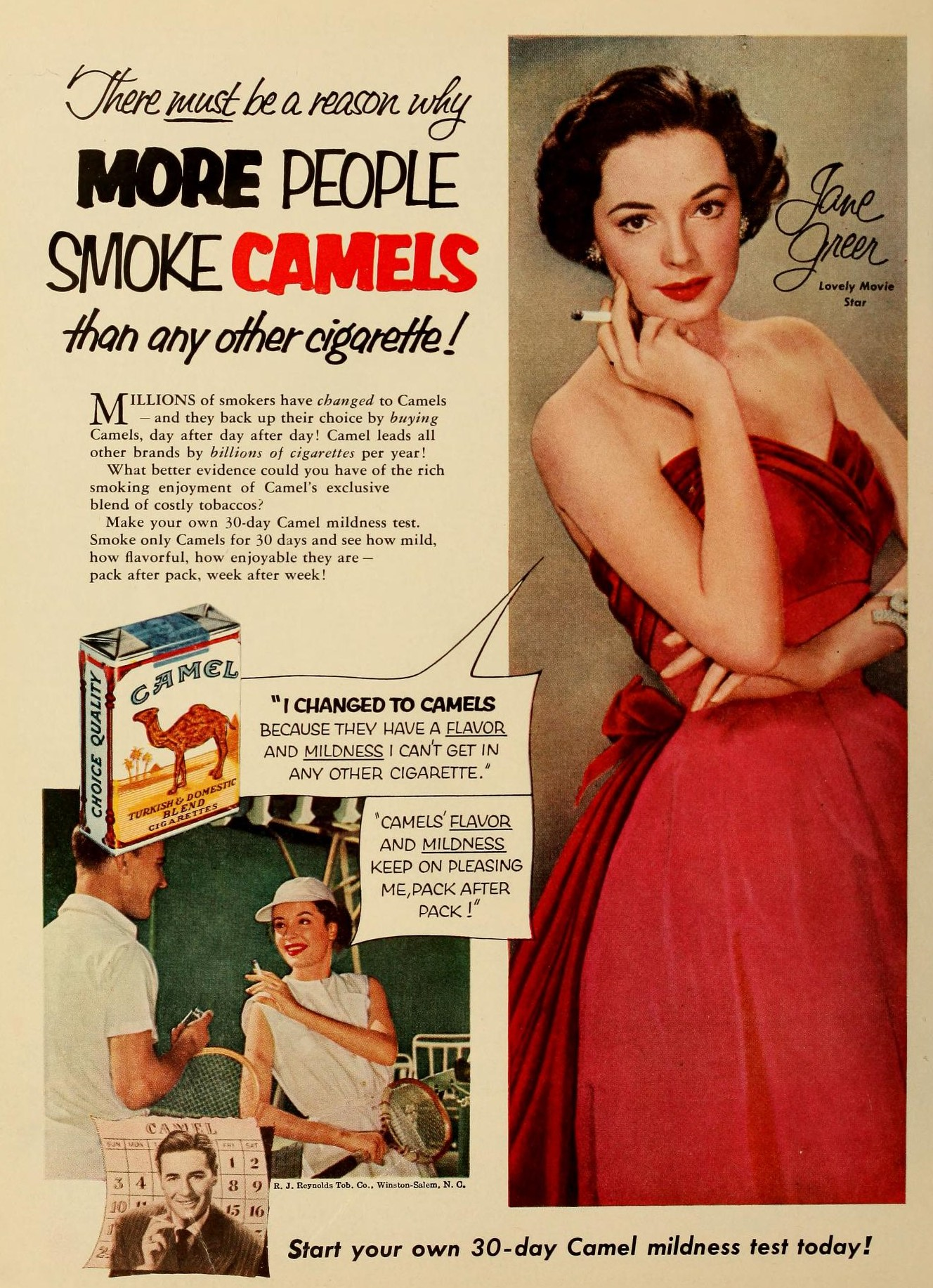
There are many examples of the tobacco industry targeting women

When an organisation begins to construct their advertising campaign they need to research each and every aspect of their target market and target consumers. The target consumers (or "potential customers") are the people who are most likely to buy from an organisation. They can be categorized by several key characteristics: mainly gender, age, occupation, marital status, geographical location, behavioral, level of income and education. This process is called segmenting customers on the basis of demographics.

== Target market ==
Defining the target market helps businesses and individuals design a marketing campaign. This in turn helps businesses and individuals avoid waste and get their advertisements to likely customers. While attempting to find the correct target market it is important to focus on specific groups of individuals that will benefit. By marketing to specific groups of individuals that specifically relate to the product, businesses and individuals will more quickly and efficiently find those who will purchase the product. Businesses and individuals that monitor their existing data (customer and sales data) will find it easier to define their target market, and surveying existing customers will assist in finding more customers. Avoiding inefficiencies when finding a target market is equally as important. Wasting time and money advertising to a large group of potential customers is inefficient if only a handful become customers. A focused plan that reaches a tiny audience can work out well if they're already interested in a product. Over time target markets can change. People interested today might not be interested tomorrow, and those not interested in the present time might become interested over time. Analysing sales data and customer information helps businesses and individuals understand when their target market is increasing or decreasing.

There are many advantages that are associated with finding a target market. One advantage is the "ability to offer the right product" (Suttle. R. 2016) through knowing the age and needs of the customer willing to purchase the item. Another advantage of target marketing assists businesses in understanding what price the customer will pay for the products or service. Businesses are also more efficient and effective at advertising their product, because they "reach the right consumers with messages that are more applicable" (Suttle. R. 2016).

However, there are several disadvantages that can be associated with target marketing. Firstly, finding a target market is expensive. Often businesses conduct primary research to find whom their target market is, which usually involves hiring a research agency, which can cost "tens of thousands of dollars" (Suttle, R. 2016). Finding one's target market is also time-consuming, as it often "requires a considerable amount of time to identify a target audience" (Suttle, R. 2016). Also focusing on finding a target market can make one overlook other customers that may be in a product. Businesses or individuals may find that their 'average customer' might not include those that fall just outside of the average customers "demographics" (Suttle, R. 2016), which will limit the sale of their products. The last disadvantage to note is the ethical ramifications that are associated with target marketing. An example of this would be a "beer company that may target less educated, poorer people with larger-sized bottles" (Suttle, R. 2016).

== Positioning ==
In advertising various brands compete to the most important brand to the consumer. Everyday consumers view advertising and rank particular brands compared to their competitors. Individuals rank these specific brands in an order of what is most important to them. For example, a person may compare brands of cars based on how sporty they think they look, affordability, practicality and classiness. How one person perceives a brand is different from another but is largely left to the advertising campaign to manipulate and create the perception that they want a consumer to envision

Positioning is an important marketing concept that businesses implement to market their products or services. The positioning concept focuses on creating an image that will best attract the intended audience. Businesses that implement the positioning concept focus on promotion, price, placement and product. When the positioning concept is effective and productive it elevates the marketing efforts made by a business, and assists the buyer in purchasing the product.

The positioning process is imperative in marketing because of the specific level of consumer-based recognition is involved. A company must create a trademark brand for themselves in order to be recognizable by a broad range of consumers. For example, a fast food restaurant positions itself as fast, cheap, and delicious. They are playing upon their strengths and most visible characteristics. On the other hand, a luxury car brand will position its brand as a stylish and expensive platform because they want to target a specific brand very different from the fast food brand.

For the positioning concept to be effective one must focus on the concepts of promotion, price, place and product.

There are three basic objectives of promotion, which include: presenting product information to targeted business customers and consumers, increase demand among the target market, and differentiating a product and creating a brand identity. Tools that can be used to achieve these objectives are advertising, public relations, personal selling, direct marketing, and sales promotion.

Price of an object is crucial in the concept of positioning. Adjusting or decreasing the product price has a profound impact on the sales of the product, and should complement the other parts of the positioning concept. The price needs to ensure survival, increase profit, generate survival, gain market shares, and establish an appropriate image.

Promoting a product is essential in the positioning concept. It is the process marketers use to communicate their products' attributes to the intended target market. In order for products to be successful businesses must focus on the customer needs, competitive pressures, available communication channels and carefully crafted key messages.

Product Positioning presents several advantages in the advertising campaign, and to the businesses/ individuals that implement it. Positioning connects with superior aspects of a product and matches "them with consumers more effectively than competitors" (Jaideep, S. 2016). Positioning can also help businesses or individuals realise the consumer's expectations of the product/s they are willing to purchase from them. Positioning a product reinforces the companies name, product and brand. It also makes the brand popular and strengthens customer loyalty. Product benefits to customers are better advertised through positioning the product, which results in more interest and attention of consumers. This also attracts different types of consumers as products posse's different benefits that attract different groups of consumers, for example: a shoe that is advertised for playing sports, going for walks, hiking and casual wear will attract different groups of consumers. Another advantage of positioning is the competitive strength it gives to businesses/ individuals and their products, introducing new products successfully to the market and communicating new and varied features that are added to a product later on.

== Communication process diagram ==
The Communication of processes diagram refers to the order of operation an advertising campaign pieces together the flow of communication between a given organisation and the consumer. The diagram usually flows left to right (unless shown in a circular array) starting with the source. An advertising campaign uses the communication process diagram to ensure all the appropriate steps of communication are being taken in order.

The source is the person or organisation that has a message they want to share with potential consumers. An example of this is Vodafone wanting to tell their consumers and new consumers of a new monthly plan.

The diagram then moves on to encoding which consists of the organisation putting messages, thoughts and ideas into a symbolic form that be interpreted by the target consumer using symbols or words.

The third stage in the diagram is channel message. This occurs when the information or meaning the source wants to convoy, is put into a form to easily be transmitted to the targeted audience. This also includes the method that communication gets from the source to the receiver. Examples of this is Vodafone advertising on TV, bus stops and university campuses as students may be the intended consumer for the new plan.

Decoding is the processes that the viewer interprets the message that the source sent. Obviously it is up to the source to ensure that the message encoded well enough so that it is received as intended.

The receiver is also known as the viewer or potential consumer. This is the person who interprets the source message through channeling whether they are the intended target audience or not. Every day we interpret different advertisements even if we are not the target audience for that advertisement.

In between these steps there are external factors acting as distractions, these factors are called noise. Noise distorts the way the message gets to the intended target audience. These distractions are from all other forms of advertising and communication from every other person or organisation. Examples of noise are State of mind, unfamiliar language, unclear message, Values, Attitudes, Perceptions, Culture and Knowledge of similar products or services to name a few forms of noise.

Finally there is the response or feedback. This is the receiver's reaction to the communication of message and the way they understood it. Feedback relates to the way sales react as well as the interest or questions that arise in relation to the message put out.

== Touch points ==
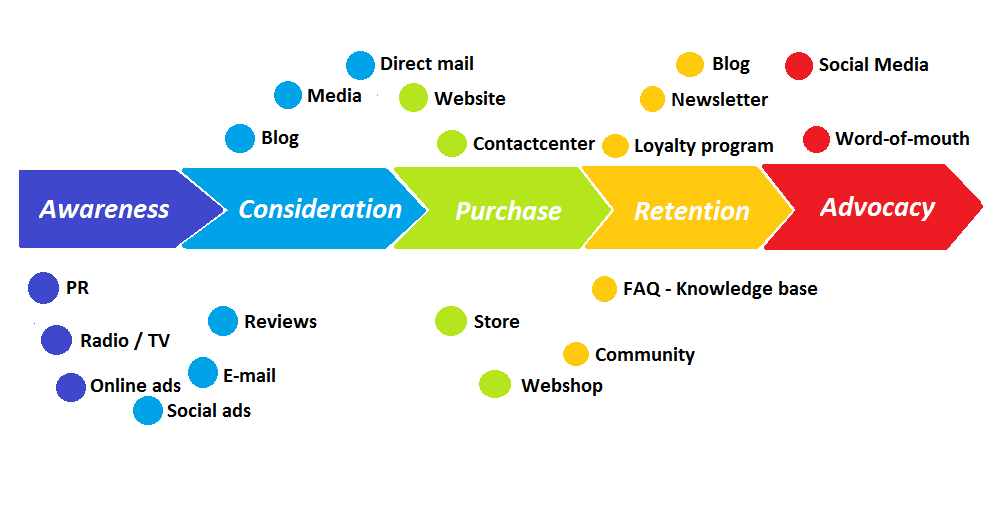
Customer journey with touchpoints English

When considering touch points in an advertising campaign a brand looks for Multisensory touch points. These touch points help the brand to develop a point of contact between themselves and the consumer. Modern day advancements in various forms of technology have made it easier for consumers to engage with brands in numerous ways. The most successful touch points are those that create value in the consumer and brands relationship. Common examples of touch points include social media links, QR codes, person handing out flyers about a particular brand, billboards, web sites and various other methods that connect the brand and consumer. The most effective touch points, as found in Effie Award- winning campaigns, are: interactive (91%), followed by TV (63%), print (52%) and consumer involvement (51%).

Multi sensory touch points are subconscious yet helps use to recognise brands through characteristic identified through human sensors. These characteristics could be shape, colour, textures, sounds, smell or tastes associated with a given brand. It is important for an advertising campaign to consider sensory cues into their campaign as market places continue to become increasingly competitive and crowded. Anyone of the given sensory characteristics may remind a person of the brand they best associate with. A prime example of this is Red Bull who use the colour, shapes and size of their cans to best relate their product to success and winning. A taller can looks like the 1st place podium when placed next to competitors, the design looks like the finish flag in racing representing winning. The opportunity for an advertising campaign to succeed is significantly increased with the use of multi sensory touch points used as a point of difference between brands.

== Guerrilla marketing ==
Guerrilla marketing is an advertising strategy which increases brand exposure through the use of unconventional campaigns which initiate social discussion and "buzz". This can often be achieved with lower budgets than conventional advertising methods, allowing small and medium-sized businesses the chance to compete against larger competitors. Through unconventional methods, inventiveness and creativity, guerrilla marketing leaves the receiver with a long lasting impression of the brand as most guerrilla marketing campaigns target the receivers at a personal level, taking them by surprise and may incorporate an element of shock. Guerrilla marketing is typically executed exclusively in public places, including streets, parks, shopping centres etc., to ensure maximum audience resulting in further discussion on social media.

Guerrilla marketing is the term used for several types of marketing categories including street marketing, ambient marketing, presence marketing, alternative marketing, experimental marketing, grassroots marketing, flyposting, guerrilla projection advertising, undercover marketing and astroturfing.

Jay Conrad Levinson coined the term Guerrilla Marketing with his 1984 book of the same name. Through the enhancement of technology and common use of internet and mobile phones, marketing communication has become more affordable and guerrilla marketing is on the rise, allowing the spread of newsworthy guerrilla campaigns.

When establishing a guerrilla marketing strategy, there are seven elements to a clear and logical approach. Firstly, write a statement that identifies the purpose of the strategy. Secondly define how the purpose will be achieved concentrating on the key advantages. Next Levinson (1989) suggests writing a descriptive summary on the target market or consumers. The fourth element is to establish a statement that itemizes the marketing tools and methods planning to be used in the strategy (for example, radio advertising during 6.30am – 9am on weekday mornings or window displays that are regularly updated). The fifth step is to create a statement which positions the brand/product/company in the market. Define the brands characteristics and give it an identity is the sixth element. Lastly, clearly identify a budget which will be put solely towards marketing going forward.

For a successful overall guerrilla marketing campaign, combine the above steps with seven winning actions. These seven principles are commitment – stick to the marketing plan without changing it; investment – appreciate that marketing is an investment, consistency – ensure the marketing message and strategy remains consistent across all forms of, confidence – show confidence in the commitment to the guerrilla marketing strategy, patience – time and dedication to the strategy, assortment – incorporate different methods of advertising and marketing for optimum results, and subsequent – build customer loyalty and retention though follow up marketing post-sale.

Levinson suggests guerrilla marketing tactics were initiated to enable small businesses with limited financial resources to gain an upper hand on the corporate giants who had unlimited budgets and resources at their disposal. Large companies cottoned on to the success of guerrilla marketing and have had hundreds of effective attention grabbing campaigns using the strategies originally designed for smaller businesses with minimal marketing budgets.

Non-traditional, unconventional and shocking campaigns are highly successful in obtaining media coverage and therefore brand awareness, albeit good or bad media attention. However, like most marketing strategies a bad campaign can backfire and damage profits and sales. Undercover marketing and astroturfing are two type of guerrilla marketing that are deemed as risky and can be detrimental to the company.

"Advertising can be dated back to 4000 BC where Egyptians used papyrus to make sales messages and wall posters. Traditional advertising and marketing slowly developed over the centuries but never bloomed until early 1900s" ("What Is Guerrilla Marketing?", 2010). Guerrilla marketing are relatively simple, use tactics to advertise on a very small budget. It is to make a campaign that is "shocking, funny, unique, outrageous, clever and creative that people can't stop talking about it" (Uk essays, 2016). Guerrilla marketing is different when compared to traditional marketing tactics (Staff, 2016). "Guerrilla marketing means going after conventional goals of profits, sales and growth but doing it by using unconventional means, such as expanding offerings during gloomy economic days to inspire customers to increase the size of each purchase" (Staff, 2016). Guerrilla marketing also suggests that rather than investing money, it is better to "invest time, energy, imagination and knowledge" (Staff, 2016) instead. Guerrilla marketing puts profit as their main priority not sales as their main focal point, this is done to urge the growth of geometrically by enlarging the size of each transactions. This all done through one of the most powerful marketing weapons around, the telephone. Research shows that it will always increases profits and sales. The term "guerrilla first appeared during the war of independence in Spain and Portugal at the beginning of the 19th century it can be translated as battle" (Uk essays, 2016). Even thou guerrilla marketing was aimed for small business; this did not stop bigger business from adopting the same ideology. "Larger business has been using unconventional marketing to complement their advertising campaigns, even then some marketers argue that when bigger business utilize guerrilla marketing tactics, it isn't true guerrilla" ("What Is Guerrilla Marketing?", 2010). The reason being that larger companies have bigger budgets and usually their brands well established. In some cases, it is far riskier for a larger business to do guerrilla marketing tactics. Which can cause problem when their stunts become a flop when compared to smaller business, as they do not run as much risk, as most people will just write it off as another failed stunt. Many methods in guerrilla marketing consist of "graffiti (or reverse graffiti, where a dirty wall is selectively cleaned), interactive displays, intercept encounters in public spaces, flash mobs, or various PR stunts are often used."

Small business use social media as a form of marketing. "Collecting billions of people around the world through a series of status updates, tweets, and other rich media" ("Guerrilla Marketing Strategies for Small Businesses", 2013). Social media is a powerful tool in the world of business. Guerrilla marketing strategies and tactics are a great and cost effective way to generate" awareness for business, products and services. To maximize full potential of marketing efforts, it's to blend them with a powerful and robust online marking strategy with a marketing automation software" ("Guerrilla Marketing Strategies for Small Businesses", 2013). Which can boost small businesses. Guerrilla tactics consist of instruments that have effects on the efforts. Some instruments are usually there to maximize the surprise effect and some of these instruments mainly cutting advertising costs." Guerrilla marketing is a way of increasing the number of individuals exposed to the advertising with the cost of campaign. The instrument of diffusion helps to each a wide audience, which causes none or little cost because consumers (viral marketing) or the media (guerrilla PR) pass on the advertising message" ("Guerrilla Marketing: The Nature of the Concept and Propositions for Further Research", 2016). Guerrilla campaigns usually implement a free ride approach, this means that to cut their costs and increase the number of recipients simultaneously to maximize the low cost effect. For example, they will try to benefit from placing advertisements on big events e.g. sporting events. Guerrilla marketing was regarded to target existing customers rather than new ones, aiming to increase their engagement with a product and/ or brand. "When selecting audiences for a guerrilla message, a group that is already engaged with the product at some level is the best target; they will be quicker to recognize and respond to creative tactics, and more likely to share the experience with their friends, as social media has become a major feature of the market landscape, guerrilla marketing has shown to be particularly effective online. Consumers who regularly use social media are more likely to share their interactions with guerrilla marketing, and creative advertising can quickly go viral."

== See also ==
- Advertising
- Advertising management
- Augmented Advertising
- Campaign advertising
- Conditional rebate
- Family in advertising
- Mobile campaign (mobile advertising)
- Radio advertisement
- Television advertisement
