= 39th Ohio Infantry Regiment =

- Active: July 31, 1861, to July 9, 1865
- Country: United States
- Allegiance: Union
- Branch: Union Army
- Type: Infantry
- Engagements: Battle of Liberty; Battle of New Madrid; Battle of Island No. 10; Siege of Corinth; Battle of Iuka; Second Battle of Corinth; Battle of Parker's Cross Roads; Atlanta campaign; Battle of Resaca; Battle of Dallas; Battle of New Hope Church; Battle of Allatoona; Battle of Kennesaw Mountain; Battle of Atlanta; Siege of Atlanta; Battle of Jonesboro; Battle of Lovejoy's Station; Sherman's March to the Sea; Carolinas campaign; Battle of Bentonville

The 39th Ohio Infantry Regiment was an infantry regiment in the Union Army during the American Civil War.

== Service ==
The 39th Ohio Infantry Regiment was organized at Camp Colerain and Camp Dennison near Cincinnati, Ohio July 31 through August 13, 1861, and mustered in for three years service under the command of Colonel John Groesbeck on July 31 (seven companies) and August 2 (three companies). Fully armed and equipped, the 39th departed the camp on Sunday, August 18, by rail to St. Louis, to join Brig. Gen. John C. Frémont's Army of the West in the Department of the Missouri organizing there. (Note: It was the first Ohio regiment to enter the State of Missouri.)

=== Operations in Missouri ===
On Friday, September 6, Companies A, B, C, D, E, F, G, H, and I were sent to Macon, MO to guard the North Missouri Railroad (NMR). Company K was left in garrison in St. Louis with possession of the regiment's equipment and supplies. Shortly after reaching Macon, Companies A, B, E, and I were ordered to St. Joseph for guard-duty along the NMR until February 1, 1862, when they were ordered back to St. Louis. The other five companies in Macon (C, D, F, G, and H), marched under Col. Samuel D. Sturgis, to relieve the siege of Lexington, MO. Before they got there, the garrison surrendered on September 20, so Sturgis went to Kansas City, arriving on Sunday, September 22. (Note: This was the first march for the soldiers of the 39th, and, as it was made rapidly and without transportation, they suffered severely.) The regiment reunited February 19 in St Louis, at Benton Barracks.

On Saturday, February 22, the regiment embarked for Commerce, MO, arriving on Monday. In the 1st Brigade, 1st Division of Maj. Gen. John Pope's Army of the Mississippi (AoM), it marched in his surprise march on New Madrid, MO arriving Monday, March 3. Pope laid siege, and 39th Ohio operated in support of the operations resulting in the capture of New Madrid on Friday, March 14, and Island No. 10 three and a half weeks later on April 7, clearing the Mississippi as far south as Memphis. (Note: While the Army of the Mississippi moved down the Mississippi, the U.S Army of the Tennessee under Maj. Gen. Grant had moved up the Tennessee aiming towards Corinth, and the Army of the Ohio under Maj. Gen. Buell was moving from Nashville to join the force on the river. Realizing the federal forces were too spread out, Washington decided to concentrate troops at Pittsburg Landing. On April 6, the Confederate Army of Mississippi under General Albert Sidney Johnston launched a spoiling attackl which became the Battle of Shiloh ending the next day in a U.S. victory. For more information, see its Wikipedia article.)

=== The Corinth campaign ===
The following Sunday, April 13, the 39th, as part of the AoM, again boarded steamers and moved down the Mississippi to within a few miles of Fort Pillow. Remaining four days until Thursday, April 17, it steamed up the Tennessee River and disembarked at Hamburg Landing, the Army of the Mississippi joined the other two under the overall command of Maj. Gen. Halleck. The 39th then participated in the Siege of Corinth. (Note: The Siege of Corinth lasted from April 29 to May 30, 1862, U. S. forces under Halleck engaged in a month-long siege of the city, whose Confederate defenders were commanded by General Beauregard. The siege resulted in the capture of the town by Federal forces. For more information see its Wikipedia article.) During the siege, the 39th made numerous reconnaissance patrols and had a large number of skirmishes, losing many men. On Friday, May 30, the regiment led Pope's army into Corinth, and was one of the first regiments to occupy the place. After pursuing the retreating Rebels as far as Boonville, the regiment returned to within five miles of Corinth and encamped on Clear Creek.

Through June, July, and August, the 39th continued training with officers' school, company, and battalion drill held daily. On July 25, the regiment turned in its Greenwood rifle, (Note: These were US M-1816 muskets that had been converted to percussion cap and rifled by the Eagle Ironworks in Cincinnati. Due to their reliability even after rifling, the Greenwood rifles gained a good reputation with the Ohio regiments that carried them.) with which it had been previously supplied and was issued Eli Whitney-manufactured Springfield Model 1861 rifled muskets and saber bayonets. The next day, the AoM received a new commander, Maj. Gen. William S. Rosecrans.

On Sunday, August 24, the regiment received an influx of 44 recruits from Ohio. On the following Friday, it moved to Iuka where the regiment was again sent out in detachments to guard the Memphis and Charleston Railroad (M&CRR). On Thursday, September 11, the regiment came together and returned to Corinth, and stowed all its extra gear at the camp.

The AoM moved on Iuka in concert with the Army of the Tennessee (AoT), now under Maj. Gen. Edward Ord, with Maj. Gen. Grant in overall command. Grant planned a double envelopment of the Confederate Army of the West, commanded by Maj. Gen. Sterling Price, with the AoM (including the 39th) attacking from the southwest, and three divisions of the AoT from the northwest. Departing Corinth, September 11, by September 18, the AoM was 20 miles from Iuka. Rosecrans sent word to Grant that he would reach Iuka by midafternoon on Friday. Considering this delay, Grant ordered Ord to move toward the town, but not to attack until hearing the sound of the AoM's fighting south of the town.

The 39th Ohio was within two miles (3.2 km) of the town on September 19, when contact was made. Soon engaged in a hard battle, the 39th was in Col Fuller's Ohio Brigade of BG Stanley's 2nd Division as it fought fiercely on Rosecrans' right driving the rebels' left out of town. A north wind, blowing from Ord's position in the direction of Iuka, caused an acoustic shadow that prevented Ord's troops stood idly while the fighting raged only a few miles away.

Despite the lack of support, the 39th and its comrades defeated the enemy and pursued them for two days before returning to Corinth, Thursday, October 2. The following morning, the regiment was in Stanley's reserve southwest of the rail junction as the Confederates, now under Maj. Gen. Earl Van Dorn approached from the northwest. In response, on Friday morning, Rosecrans pushed three of his divisions into the old Confederate rifle pits north and northwest of town. The 39th was in reserve south of town. Van Dorn began his assault at 10 a.m. and his troops broke through about 1:30 p.m., forcing the whole Union line back. Darkness ended the fighting. The Confederates had driven the AoM back at all points, but both sides were exhausted from the fighting in the hot weather (high of 94 °F (34 °C)). The 39th and its army comrades were confident ready for the next day.

Before dawn, Saturday morning, October 4, the Confederates opened a bombardment that lasted until after sunrise. When the guns fell silent, the expected attack did not occur until 9:00 a.m. The 39th Ohio was in Stanley's division in the AoM's center where despite initial rebel successes, the regiment and its comrtades repulsed all Confederate attacks. By 1:00 p.m, all of Van Dorn's assaults had failed, and he ordered a retreat. Reinforcements from Grant at 4:00 p.m sealed Rosecrans' and the AoM's victory.

The regiment joined the pursuit of the Rebels as far as Baldwin after which it returned to Corinth, and worked on its inner line of defensive works.

The regiment was attached to Army of the West and Department of the Missouri to February 1862. 1st Brigade, 1st Division, Army of the Mississippi, to April 1862. 1st Brigade, 2nd Division, Army of the Mississippi, to November 1862. 1st Brigade, 8th Division, Left Wing, XIII Corps, Department of the Tennessee, to December 1862. 1st Brigade, 8th Division, XVI Corps, to March 1863. 4th Brigade, District of Corinth, Mississippi, 2nd Division, XVI Corps, to May 1863. 3rd Brigade, District of Memphis, Tennessee, 5th Division, XVI Corps, to November 1863. Fuller's Brigade, 2nd Division, XVI Corps, to January 1864. 1st Brigade, 4th Division, XVI Corps, to September 1864. 1st Brigade, 1st Division, XVII Corps, to July 1865.

The 39th Ohio Infantry mustered out of service at Louisville, Kentucky, on July 9, 1865.

== Affiliations, battle honors, detailed service, casualties, and armament ==
=== Organizational affiliation ===
Attached to:

- Army of the West and Department of Missouri to February, 1862
- 1st Brigade, 1st Division, Army of Mississippi (AoM), to April, 1862
- 1st Brigade, 2nd Division, AoM, to November, 1862.
- 1st Brigade, 8th Division, Left Wing XIII Corps, Department of the Tennessee, to December, 1862
- 1st Brigade, 8th Division, XVI Corps, AoM, to March, 1863
- 4th Brigade, District of Corinth, 2nd Division, XVI Corps, to May, 1863.
- 3rd Brigade, District of Memphis, 5th Division, XVI Corps, AoM, to November, 1863.
- 1st Brigade, 2nd Division, XVI Corps, AoM, to January, 1864
- 1st Brigade, 4th Division, XVI Corps, AoM, to September, 1864
- 1st Brigade, 1st Division, XVII Corps, to July, 1865.

=== List of battles ===
The official list of battles in which the regiment bore a part:

- Battle of Liberty
- Battle of New Madrid
- Battle of Island No. 10
- Siege of Corinth
- Battle of Iuka
- Second Battle of Corinth
- Battle of Parker's Cross Roads
- Atlanta campaign
- Battle of Resaca
- Battle of Dallas
- Battle of New Hope Church
- Battle of Allatoona
- Battle of Kennesaw Mountain
- Battle of Atlanta
- Siege of Atlanta
- Battle of Jonesboro
- Battle of Lovejoy's Station
- Sherman's March to the Sea
- Carolinas campaign
- Battle of Bentonville

=== Detailed service ===
The 39th Ohio's detailed service is as follows:

==== 1861 ====
- Left Ohio for St. Louis, MO, August 18
- Moved to Macon, MO September 6 (A, B, C, D, E, F, G, H, and I)
- Company K served detached at Benton Barracks, St. Louis, September 1861 to February 1862
- Companies A, B, E, and I on duty at St. Joseph, MO, guarding Northern Missouri Railroad September 1861 to February 1862
- Companies C, D, F, G, and H marched to relief of Lexington, MO, September 12–20
- Upon Lexington's surrender, moved to Kansas City September 21–22
- In Fremont's advance on Springfield, MO, October 15-November 2, 1861
- March to Sedalia, MO November 9–17
- Duty at Sedalia and Syracuse, MO, until February 1862
- Action at Shanghai December 1, 1861.

==== 1862 ====
- Moved to St. Louis, February 2, 1862
- Then to Commerce, MO, February 22–24
- Siege operations against New Madrid, MO, March 3–14
- Siege and capture of Island No. 10, Mississippi River, and pursuit to Tiptonville March 15-April 8
- Expedition to Fort Pillow, TN, April 13–17
- Moved to Hamburg Landing, TN, April 18–22
- Action at Monterey April 29
- Advance on and siege of Corinth, MS, April 29-May 30
- Reconnaissance toward Corinth May 8
- Near Corinth May 24
- Occupation of Corinth and pursuit to Booneville, MS, May 30-June 12
- Duty at Clear Creek, MS until August 29
- Battle of Iuka, MS, September 19
- Battle of Corinth, October 3–4
- Pursuit to Ripley, MS, October 5–12
- Grant's Central Mississippi Campaign November 2, 1862, to January 12, 1863
- Expedition to Jackson, MS December 18
- Action at Parker's Cross Roads, MS December 30
- Red Mound, MS, or Parker's Cross Roads December 31
- Duty at Corinth until April 1863.

==== 1863 ====
- Dodge's Expedition to northern Alabama April 15-May 8
- Rock Cut, near Tuscumbia, AL, April 22
- Tuscumbia April 23
- Town Creek, AL, April 28
- Duty at Memphis, TN., until October
- Moved to Prospect, TN, until February 1864
- Regiment reenlisted at Prospect December 26, 1863.

==== 1864 ====
- Atlanta Campaign May 1 to September 8, 1864
- Demonstrations on Resaca, GA May 8–13
- Sugar Valley, near Resaca, May 9
- Near Resaca May 13
- Battle of Resaca May 14–15
- Advance on Dallas, GA May 18–25
- Operations on line of Pumpkin Vine Creek and battles about Dallas, New Hope Church and Allatoona Hills May 25-June 5
- Operations about Marietta, GA, and against Kennesaw Mountain, GA, June 10-July 2
- Assault on Kennesaw June 27
- Nickajack Creek July 2–5
- Ruff's Mills July 3–4
- Chattahoochie River July 5–17
- Battle of Atlanta July 22
- Siege of Atlanta July 22-August 25
- Flank movement on Jonesboro, GA, August 25–30
- Battle of Jonesboro August 31-September 1
- Lovejoy's Station, GA, September 2–6
- Operations against Hood in northern Georgia and northern Alabama September 29-November 3
- March to the Sea November 15-December 10
- Monteith Swamp, GA, December 9
- Siege of Savannah, GA, December 10–21.

==== 1865 ====
- Campaign of the Carolinas January to April 1865
- Reconnaissance to the Salkehatchie River, S.C., January 20
- Skirmishes at Rivers and Broxton Bridges, Salkehatchie River, February 2
- Action at Rivers Bridge, Salkehatchie River, February 3
- Binnaker's Bridge, South Edisto River, February 9
- Orangeburg, North Edisto River, February 12–13
- Columbia February 16–17
- Juniper Creek, near Cheraw, March 3
- Battle of Bentonville, N.C., March 20–21
- Occupation of Goldsboro and Raleigh, Bennett's House, April 26
- Surrender of Johnston and his army
- March to Washington, D.C., via Richmond, Va., April 29-May 20
- Grand Review of the Armies May 24
- Moved to Louisville, Ky., June.

== Casualties ==
The regiment lost a total of 196 men during service; 2 officers and 62 enlisted men killed or mortally wounded, 3 officers and 129 enlisted men died of disease.

== Armament ==
Soldiers in the 39th were armed with "Greenwood Rifles," (Note: Steamboats and the Miami and Erie Canal had already turned Cincinnati into a commercial and industrial hub when in 1832, Miles Greenwood established the Eagle Ironworks along the Miami Canal. After 1836, the railroads further developed the city, and Greenwood's company quickly grew to be the largest ironworks in the midwestern United States. With the onset of the Civil War, he received contracts to modernize US-made and imported smoothbore flintlock muskets to percussion cap weapons. Despite problems other contractors had with rifling percussion-altered US M-1816 muskets, Greenwood apparently had more success, and a Cincinnati newspaper reported that his altered .69 caliber muskets had better penetrating power than the standard .58 rifle muskets. The 39th went off to St. Louis carrying "Greenwood Rifles".) a Cincinnati produced percussion and rifled alteration of the smoothbore, .69 -caliber Springfield Model 1816s. On July 25, 1862, in camp near Corinth, they turned these in and received National Armory contracted Eli Whitney manufactured Springfield Model 1861 .58- caliber rifled-muskets with saber bayonets. (Note: In government records, National Armory refers to one of three United States Armory and Arsenals, the Springfield Armory, the Harpers Ferry Armory, and the Rock Island Arsenal. Rifle-muskets, muskets, and rifles were manufactured in Springfield and Harper's Ferry before the war. When the Rebels destroyed the Harpers Ferry Armory early in the American Civil War and stole the machinery for the Confederate central government-run Richmond Armory, the Springfield Armory was briefly the only government manufacturer of arms, until the Rock Island Arsenal was established in 1862. Although Springfield ramped up its production significantly, In the first year of the war, the U.S. government had to turn to contractors to produce them. When the American arms company, Robbins & Lawrence's and its successor, Vermont Arms, went bankrupt, Eli Whitney purchased some of the gunsmithing machinery and began producing 1861, as well as other models.)

== Commanders ==
- Colonel John Groesbeck - discharged July 8, 1862
- Colonel Alfred West Gilbert - resigned October 11, 1862
- Colonel Edward Follansbee Noyes - commanded at the Battle of Island No. 10 as major; brevet brigadier general, March 13, 1865; resigned April 22, 1865
- Colonel Daniel Weber - promoted to colonel May 18, 1865; mustered out with regiment July 9, 1865

== See also ==
- List of Ohio Civil War units
- Ohio in the Civil War
