= Action at Blue Mills Landing =

Action of the American Civil War

- Part of the Trans-Mississippi Theater of the American Civil War
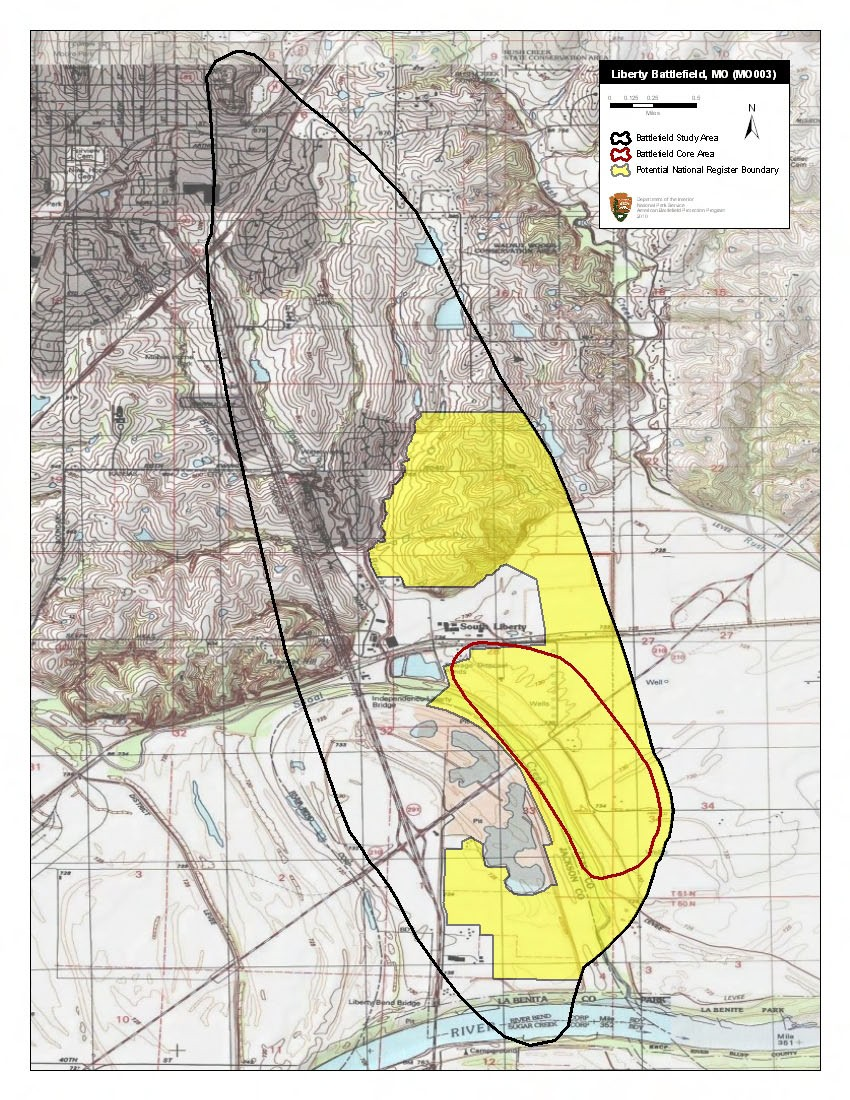
- Map of Liberty Battlefield core and study areas by the American Battlefield Protection Program
Date	September 17, 1861
Location	Near Liberty, Missouri 39°11′16″N 94°23′3.12″W
Result	Confederate victory

Belligerents
Missouri (Confederate)	United States (Union)

Commanders and leaders
Brig. Gen. David R. Atchison	(United States) Lieut. Col. John Scott

Units involved
4th Division, Missouri State Guard	3rd Iowa Infantry; Missouri Home Guard

Strength
3,500	600

Casualties and losses
70	56
- Location within Missouri

The action at Blue Mills Landing, also known as the Battle of Liberty, was a battle of the American Civil War that took place on September 17, 1861, in Clay County, Missouri. Union forces unsuccessfully attempted to prevent pro-Southern Missouri State Guards from northwestern Missouri from crossing the Missouri River near the confluence with the Blue River to reinforce Sterling Price at Lexington.

== Background ==
After his victory at Wilson's Creek in August, Price began a campaign to gain control of Missouri. Union troops had been guarding the Hannibal and St. Joseph Railroad and its terminus in St. Joseph, Missouri. When these Union forces were pulled away to meet Price's army, Confederate sympathizers from northwestern Missouri seized St. Joseph and sacked the town.

On 15 September, about 3,500 men of the Missouri State Guard plus a number of irregulars from St. Joseph set out for Lexington. In the evening, Price sent Brigadier-General David R. Atchison from Lexington to help these men, mostly new recruits, cross the river near Liberty.

Union troops of the 16th Illinois Infantry and the 39th Ohio Infantry were guarding the Platte River railroad bridge in Buchanan County, which had earlier been sabotaged in the Platte Bridge Railroad Tragedy. These troops started moving to Liberty. At the same time, Union Lieutenant-Colonel John Scott led a small force (500 men of the 3rd Iowa Infantry, about 100 Missouri Home Guards, and one 6-pound smoothbore cannon) from Cameron towards Liberty. Heavy rain and bad roads limited their progress to only seven miles that day. On 16 September, Scott camped in Centerville (ten miles north of Liberty), where he heard artillery fire in the distance.

== Battle ==
Lieutenant-Colonel Scott broke camp at 2:00 A.M. on 17 September. He arrived in Liberty at 7:00 A.M. At that point Southern troops were already crossing the Missouri River at Blue Mills Landing. Lt. Colonel Scott sent 20 mounted scouts towards the landing to locate the enemy and determine the status of their crossing. At a location near the modern day intersection of Liberty Landing Road and Old Highway 210, the rear guard of Atchison's troops waited in ambush. The Union scouts rode directly into the trap with four of their men killed and a fifth severely wounded. The surviving scouts retreated back towards Liberty. At noon, Scott began moving his entire force towards the river landing.

General Atchison, who had lived in Liberty, deployed his men in the brush on either side of the Missouri River bottom land road leading to the landing. At about 3:00 P.M., Scott's troops encountered the State Guard pickets and were attacked from both sides.

Scott's artillerymen fired two rounds of canister, inflicting some damage. However, a fresh volley from the State Guards scattered or killed most of the gunners. Scott ordered his outnumbered force to fall back towards Liberty, hauling off the gun by hand. Atchison attempted a flanking movement on the Federal right, which resulted in a sharp fight. The Union force continued to withdraw, firing as they retreated, taking with them nearly all their wounded, but abandoning their ammunition wagon and a caisson. The State Guard pursued for some distance, but Atchison did not press the attack.

Just before nightfall, Scott's force retired to Liberty, entering the town about an hour after sunset. Atchison and the State Guards from northern Missouri crossed the river to reinforce Price in his successful attack on Lexington. After sunset the Union troops returned to retrieve their dead from the field.

The battle, which lasted about an hour, was a decisive victory for the Pro-Southern Missouri State Guard.

== Casualties ==
Nineteen Union troops died as a result of the fighting. Approximately 80 were wounded. Three men of the Southern command were killed; 18 were wounded. Scott and his troops returned to Liberty where they established a hospital in Jewell Hall on the William Jewell College campus. Surviving members of Scott’s command buried their dead comrades near Mt. Memorial Cemetery, which today is part of the William Jewell campus. Those soldiers were moved to the Fort Leavenworth National Cemetery in 1912.

== Sources ==
- U. S. War Department, The War of the Rebellion: A Compilation of the Official Records of the Union and Confederate Armies, 70 volumes in 4 series. Washington, D.C.: United States Government Printing Office, 1880–1901. Series 1, Volume 3, Part 1, pages 193–195.
