= Battle of Parker's Cross Roads =

Battle of the American Civil War

Coordinates: 35.7930°N 88.393°W

- Part of American Civil War
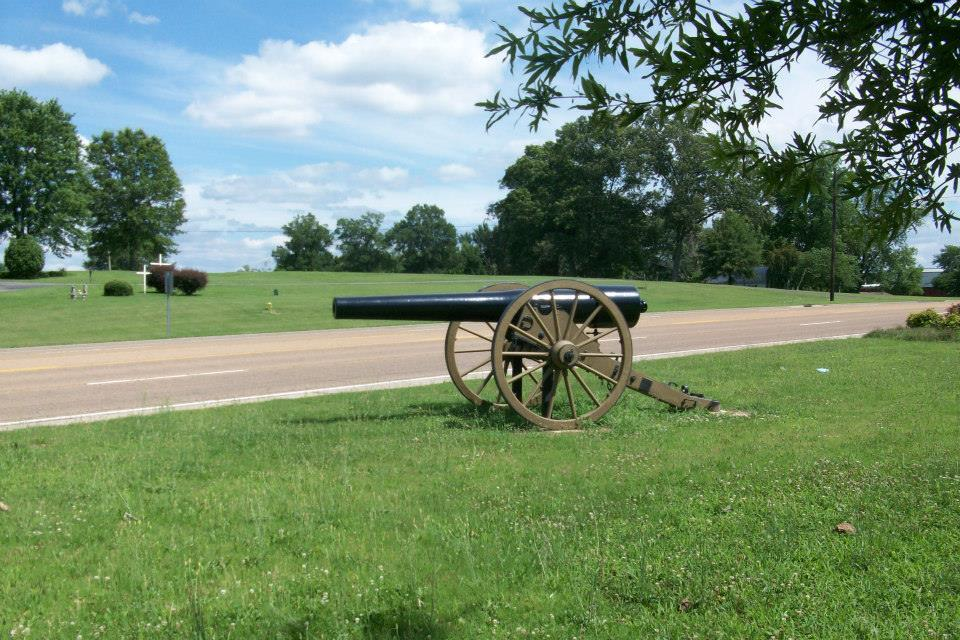
- A replica cannon on the site of the battle.
Date	December 31, 1862
Location	Henderson County, Tennessee
Result	Confederate victory

Belligerents
USA (Unionists)	CSA (Confederates)

Commanders and leaders
Jeremiah C. Sullivan	Nathan Bedford Forrest

Units involved
50th Indiana Infantry Regiment; 122nd Illinois Infantry Regiment; 18th Illinois Mounted Infantry Regiment; 39th Iowa Infantry Regiment; 7th Wisconsin Artillery Battery; 27th Ohio Infantry Regiment; 39th Ohio Infantry Regiment; 63rd Ohio Infantry Regiment	8th Tennessee Cavalry; 4th Alabama Cavalry; 19th Tennessee Cavalry; Napier's Cavalry Battalion; Kentucky Battalion; 4th Tennessee Cavalry; 2nd Battalion Tennessee Cavalry; Freeman's Battery; Morton's Battery

Strength
3,000	1,800

Casualties and losses
237	500

The Battle of Parker's Cross Roads (now Crossroads) was fought on December 31, 1862, in Henderson County, Tennessee, during the American Civil War.

== Background ==
As Confederate Brig. Gen. Nathan Bedford Forrest's expedition into West Tennessee neared its conclusion, Union Brig. Gen. Jeremiah C. Sullivan, with the brigades of Cols. Cyrus L. Dunham and John W. Fuller, attempted to cut Forrest off from withdrawing across the Tennessee River.

== Battle ==
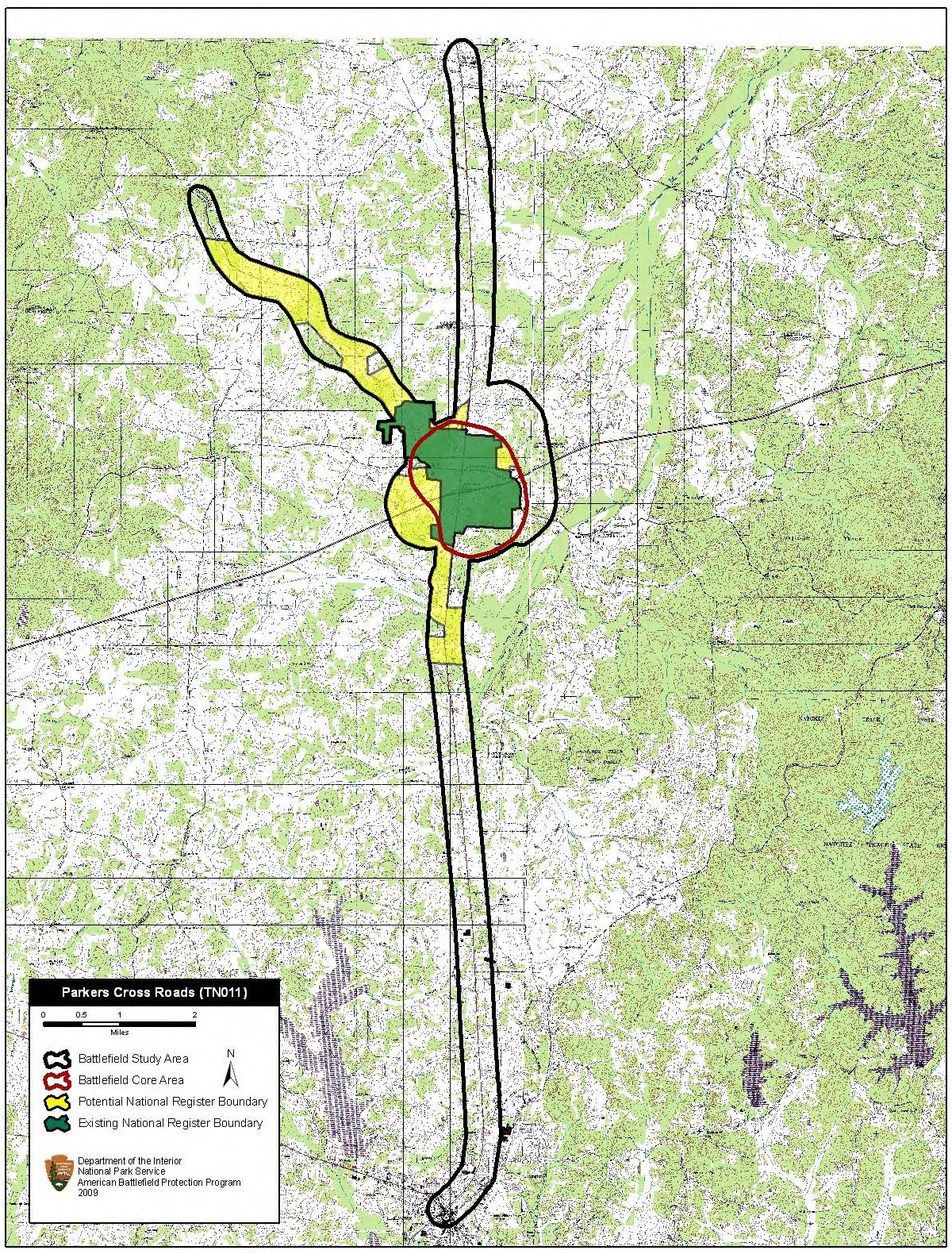
Map of Parker's Crossroads Battlefield core and study areas by the American Battlefield Protection Program

Dunham and Forrest's march routes brought them into contact at Parker's Crossroads on December 31, 1862. Skirmishing began about 9 am, with Forrest taking an initial position along a wooded ridge northwest of Dunham at the intersection. Confederate artillery gained an early advantage. Dunham pulled his brigade back a half-mile and redeployed, facing north. His Federals repelled frontal feints until attacked on both flanks and rear by Forrest's mounted and dismounted troops.

During a lull, Forrest sent Dunham a demand for an unconditional surrender. Dunham refused and was preparing for Forrest's next attack, when Fuller's Union brigade arrived from the north and surprised the Confederates with an attack on their rear; Confederate security detachments had failed to warn of Fuller's approach. "Charge 'em both ways," ordered Forrest. The Confederates briefly reversed front, repelled Fuller, then rushed past Dunham's demoralized force and withdrew south to Lexington, Tennessee.

== Aftermath ==
After the fight, Forrest was able to cross the Tennessee River. Both sides claimed this battle as a victory. The Confederate forces withdrew and suffered greater casualties, but Forrest was able to achieve his strategic aim of a safe retreat.

== Battlefield preservation ==
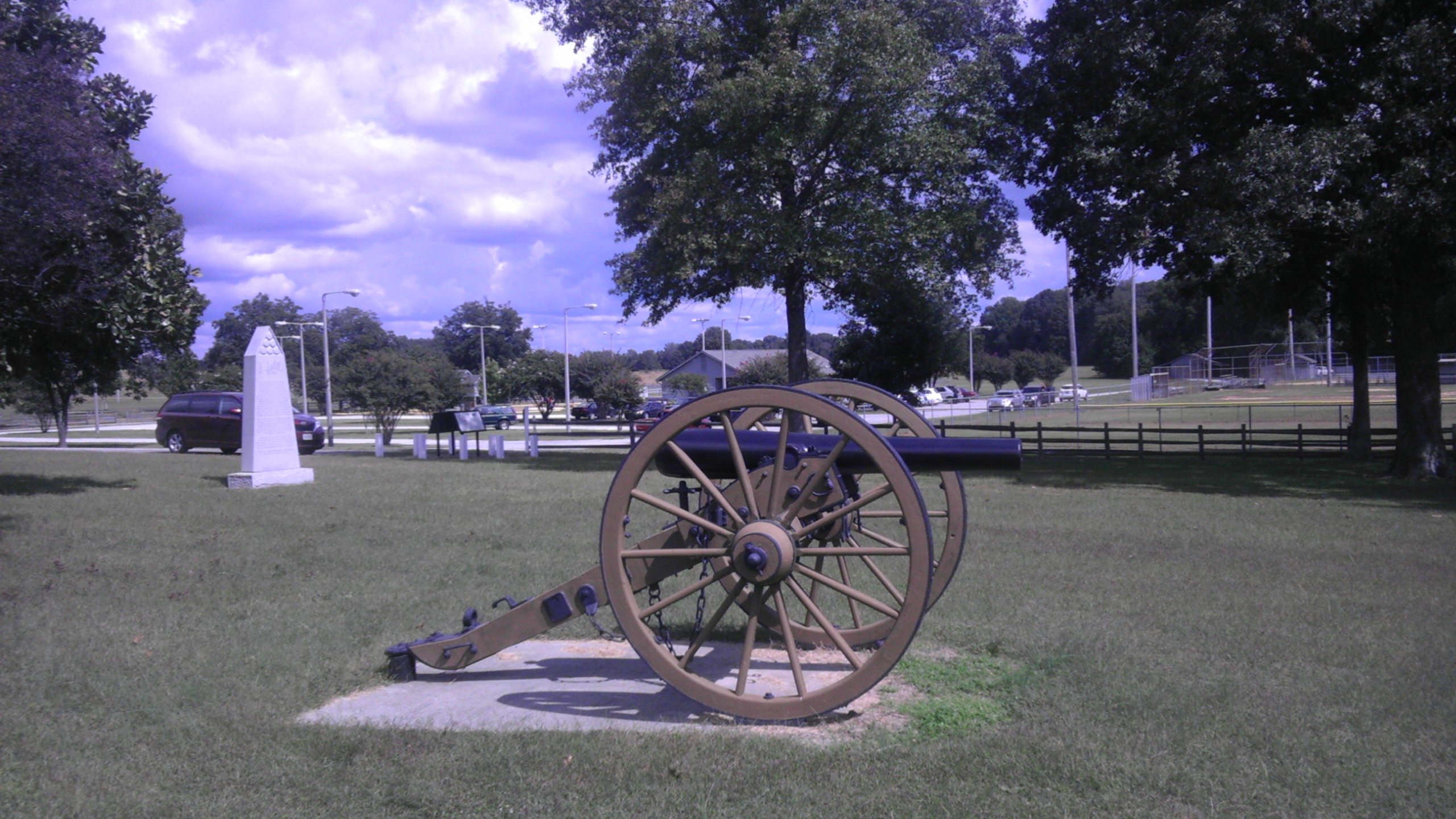
Parkers Crossroads Civil War Battlefield

The land upon which the Battle of Parker's Crossroads took place is now traversed east and west by Interstate 40 and north and south by Tennessee State Route 22, located midway between Memphis and Nashville. The nearby town has grown considerably since the interstate highway opened in the late 1960s. Developers and investors are constantly looking at the battlefield area for business development, making preservation efforts particularly urgent.

About 368 acres of the battlefield have been saved thus far, all by the American Battlefield Trust in consort with its partners, including a local group, the Parker's Crossroads Battlefield Association. In 2011, the trust inaugurated a campaign to preserve what is called the "keystone tract", the final unpreserved piece of land from the old battlefield. Most of the Confederate artillery was located on this 52-acre parcel. Many preservationists believe that if this land falls into the hands of commercial developers, the ability to interpret the battlefield in a meaningful way will be lost. It has been an affiliated area of the Shiloh National Military Park since 2019.
