= Horace Heffren =

American politician, soldier, and Copperhead (1831–1883)

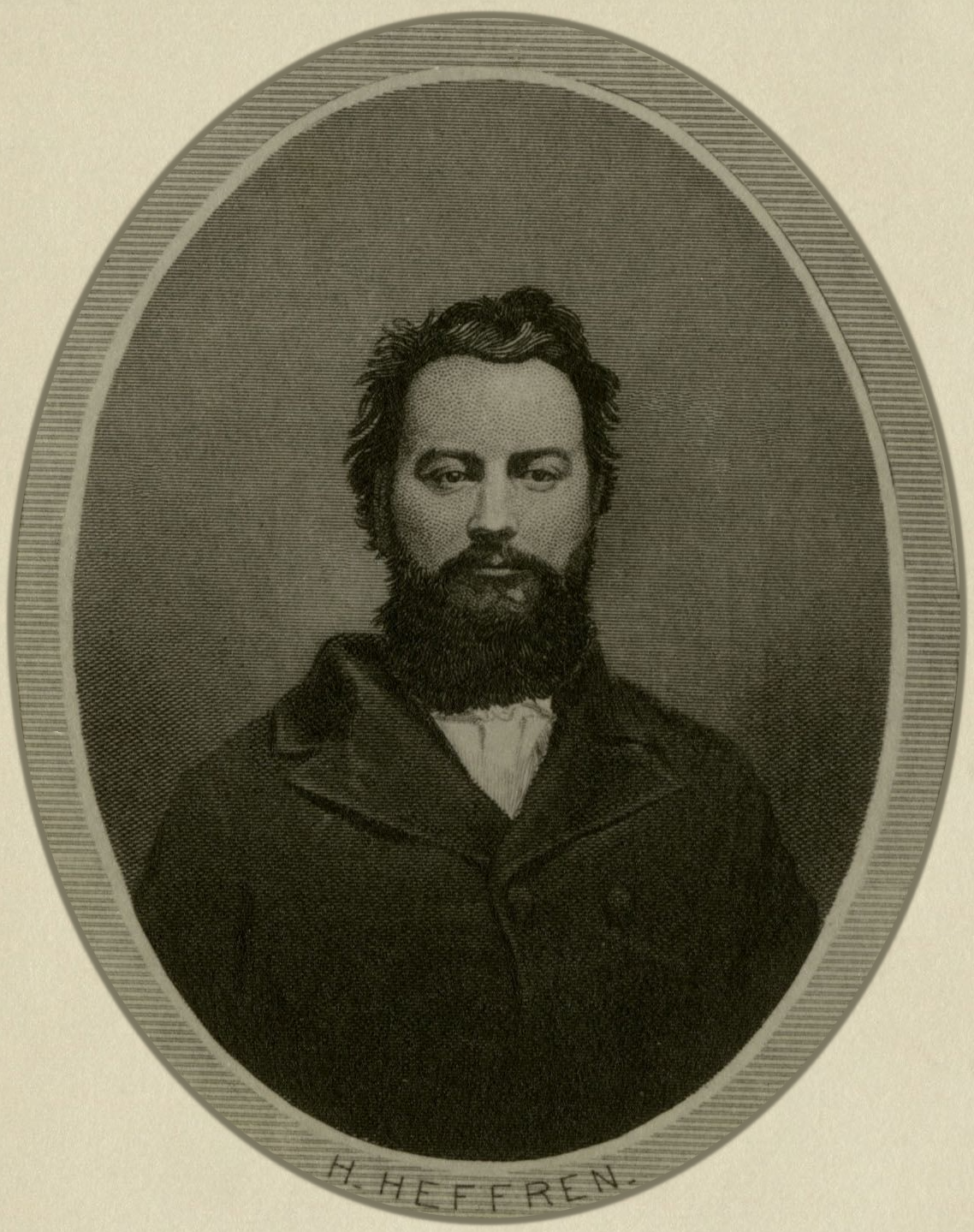
- Horace Heffren
- Born: May 27, 1831; Tompkins County, New York, U.S.
- Died: May 20, 1883 (aged 51); Salem, Indiana, U.S.
- Resting place: Crown Hill Cemetery, Salem, Indiana
- Occupations: Lawyer, newspaper editor, soldier, politician
- Known for: Leader of the Order of the Sons of Liberty; defendant turned witness in the 1864 Indianapolis treason trials
- Political party: Democratic
- Relatives: Cyrus L. Dunham (uncle)
- Military career
- Allegiance: United States
- Branch: Union Army
- Service years: 1861–1862
- Rank: Lieutenant colonel
- Unit: 50th Indiana Infantry Regiment

Horace Heffren (May 27, 1831 – May 20, 1883) was an American lawyer, newspaper editor, soldier, and politician active in Salem, Washington County, Indiana. A Democrat, he served briefly as lieutenant colonel of the 50th Indiana Infantry Regiment early in the American Civil War before resigning in 1862. He is best remembered as a leader of the Copperhead secret society the Order of the Sons of Liberty in Indiana, and as a defendant in the 1864 Indianapolis treason trials who avoided prosecution by turning state's evidence—the proceedings that produced the landmark Supreme Court case Ex parte Milligan.

== Early life and career ==
Heffren was born in Tompkins County, New York, on May 27, 1831, a son of Elijah Heffren, who about 1845 moved his family to a farm near Salem in Washington County, Indiana. His mother was a sister of Cyrus L. Dunham, making Heffren a nephew of the future colonel and congressman. A younger brother, Delos Heffren, also became a prominent—and notorious—figure in the county.

Heffren studied law and became, in the words of the county historian, "an able and pugnacious Democrat" who figured in every political campaign of his life. He practiced at Salem, edited the Democratic newspaper the Salem Democrat, and won a seat in the Indiana legislature. Before the war he led the Knights of the Golden Circle in the county; according to the Washington County Historical Society, Heffren and the order drove the area's Black residents out of the county beginning around 1860.

== Civil War service ==
Heffren entered Union service on July 4, 1861, and was commissioned lieutenant colonel of the 50th Indiana Infantry Regiment, organized at Seymour under his uncle, Colonel Cyrus L. Dunham; the regiment's camp of organization, Camp Heffren, was named for him. He served about nine months before resigning his commission on September 7, 1862; Stevens wrote that he gave it up in opposition to the emancipation of enslaved people. Returning to the Salem Democrat, Heffren published bitter editorials against the Emancipation Proclamation and the conduct of the war.

== Sons of Liberty and the treason trials ==
By 1864 Heffren was Deputy Grand Commander of the Order of the Sons of Liberty in Indiana, one of the leaders of the state's chapters alongside Harrison H. Dodd, William A. Bowles, Lambdin P. Milligan, and Andrew Humphreys. After military authorities arrested Dodd for treason in September 1864, they arrested Heffren at Salem—along with Milligan, Bowles, Humphreys, Stephen Horsey, and Democratic state chairman Joseph J. Bingham—on October 5–7, 1864.

The charges against Heffren were dropped, and he became a witness for the prosecution, making a full confession of his connection with the Sons of Liberty; he was acquitted and sent home. Testifying on November 4, 1864, he revealed that the assassination of Governor Oliver P. Morton had at one time been discussed within the order, though the historian Lewis J. Wertheim noted the testimony made clear that "such a plan was largely talk." The Republican press trumpeted his cooperation under headlines such as "Deputy Grand Commander Heffren makes Clean Breast of it!" His account was published in 1864 as Sons of Liberty: Testimony of Horace Heffren, One of the Accused. The military commission's conviction of the remaining defendants was later overturned by the U.S. Supreme Court in Ex parte Milligan (1866).

== Later life and death ==
After the war Heffren returned to law, politics, and journalism at Salem. Writing for the Salem Democrat in the 1870s, he gathered old-time recollections from the county's pioneer settlers—work later collected as Pioneer Pickings—preserving much of Washington County's early history. He died at Salem on May 20, 1883, and was buried there in Crown Hill Cemetery.
