= George Stokes (Medal of Honor) =

- Born: Charles G. Bishop; 24 December 1838; England
- Died: 25 March 1919 (aged 80)
- Burial place: Oakland Memory Lanes, Dolton, Illinois
- Military career
- Allegiance: United States (Union)
- Branch: Army
- Service years: 1862-1865
- Rank: Corporal
- Units: Company C, 122nd Illinois Infantry
- Conflicts: Nashville, Tennessee
- Awards: Medal of Honor

George Stokes (also known as Charles G. Bishop, 24 December 1838 – 25 March 1919) was a corporal in the United States Army who was awarded the Presidential Medal of Honor for gallantry during the American Civil War. Stokes was awarded the medal on 24 February 1865 for actions performed at the Battle of Nashville in Tennessee on 16 December 1864.

== Personal life ==
Stokes was born in England on 24 December 1838 and lived in Kane, Illinois as a farmer. He married Augusta Anna Hough and fathered four children, of which three reached adulthood. He died on 25 March 1919 and was buried in Oakland Memory Lanes in Dolton, Illinois.

== Military service ==
Stokes enlisted in the Army as a corporal on 15 August 1862 at Jerseyville, Illinois. He was mustered into Company C of the 122nd Illinois Infantry but was demoted to private.

Stokes' Medal of Honor citation reads:

The President of the United States of America, in the name of Congress, takes pleasure in presenting the Medal of Honor to Private George Stokes, United States Army, for extraordinary heroism on 16 December 1864, while serving with Company C, 122d Illinois Infantry, in action at Nashville, Tennessee, for capture of flag.

— E. M. Stanton, Secretary of War

Stokes was mustered out of the Army on 15 July 1865 at Mobile, Alabama.
