= Colonel Robert A. Smith Monument =

- U.S. National Register of Historic Places
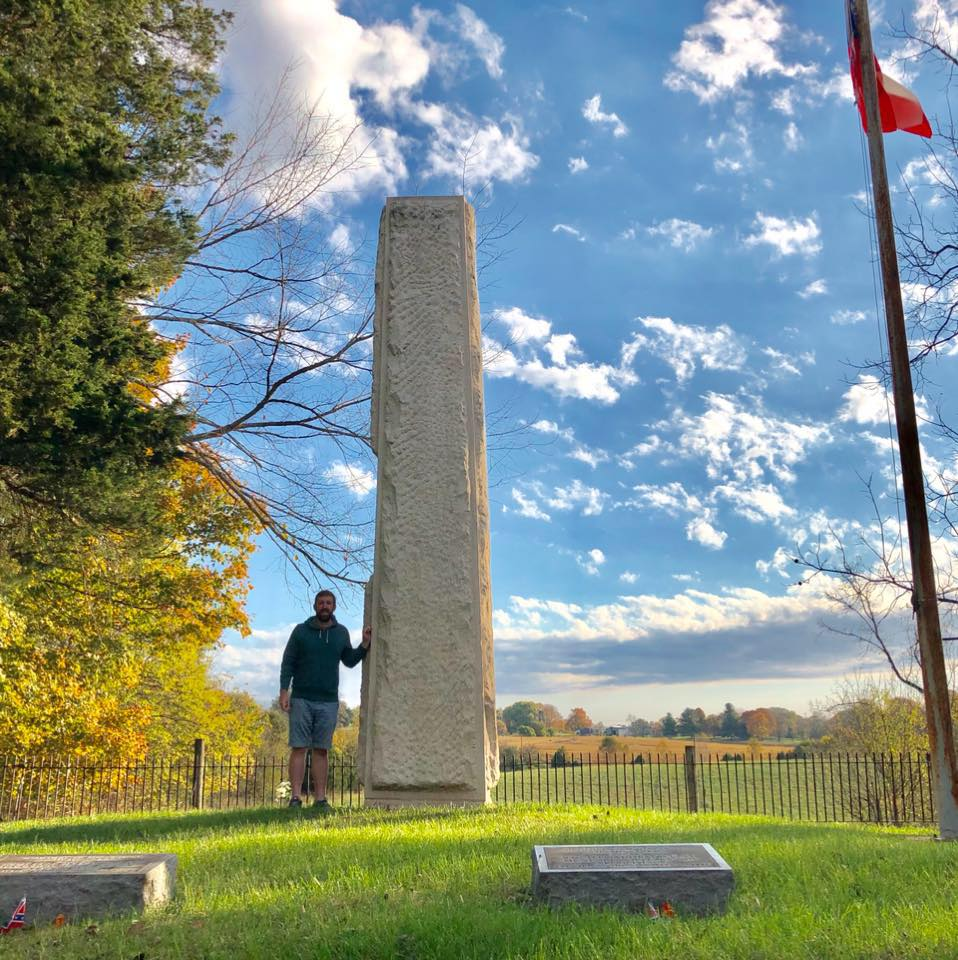

- Location within Kentucky Location within the United States
- Nearest city: Munfordville, Kentucky
- Built: 1885
- MPS: Civil War Monuments of Kentucky MPS
- NRHP reference No.: 97000693
- Added to NRHP: July 17, 1997

The Colonel Robert A. Smith Monument, located in Hart County, Kentucky, is a monument related to the American Civil War, listed on the National Register of Historic Places. It was built in the memory of Colonel Robert A. Smith and the members of the 10th Mississippi Infantry Regiment who died in the service of the Confederate States of America on September 14, 1862, at the Battle of Munfordville.

== Description ==
The monument is a 25-foot-tall, white Gothic limestone obelisk weighing 35 tons and built in 1884 by Colonel Smith's brother. It is believed that Cleopatra's Needle is the only larger single-stone work in the United States. On private property far from a road, it is just east of CSX railroad tracks, and just south of a bridge across the Green River. A cast iron fence forms a perimeter 250 feet away from the monument. To the east of the monument are six smaller marble monuments each dedicated to a separate Mississippi unit—the 7th Infantry Regiment, the 9th Infantry Regiment, the 9th Sharpshooter Battalion, the 10th Infantry Regiment, the 29th Infantry Regiment, and 44th Infantry Regiment. Soldiers were interred by the monument.

The inscription reads: SOUTH 42°WEST AND NINETY POLES DISTANT IS THE PLACE OF THE SACRIFICE OF COL ROBT A SMITH AND HIS REGIMENT THE TENTH MISSISSIPPI ON SEP 14 1862.

== History ==
On September 14, 1862, Edinburgh (Scotland)-born Colonel Smith was ordered to capture a vital bridge during the Battle of Munfordville. After three hours of combat, Confederate losses were 40 dead and 211 wounded. Smith himself was mortally wounded and in great pain until he died several days later. Members of the Smith family long believed that Smith was ordered to lead the charge by his superior, Brigadier General James R. Chalmers, who felt that Smith would eventually rise in rank and become a threat to his promotion. Chalmers did in fact order the attack on his own initiative. Smith was buried in Jackson, Mississippi.

When Robert Smith's brother James immigrated to America from Glasgow, Scotland, in 1886, he searched for the place his brother died. James decided to build a monument to honor his brother, buying the land and spending $4,000 on the monument itself. It was built by Oman & Stewart of Nashville, Tennessee, using limestone quarried from Bowling Green, Kentucky.

On July 17, 1997, it was one of sixty different monuments to the Civil War in Kentucky placed on the National Register of Historic Places, as part of the Civil War Monuments of Kentucky Multiple Property Submission.

There is another monument to Colonel Robert A. Smith in Edinburgh, where he was born, in the large Victorian Dean Cemetery. The name and date of the battle on the monument is correct, however the name of the town is misspelled as Mumfordsville instead of Munfordville.

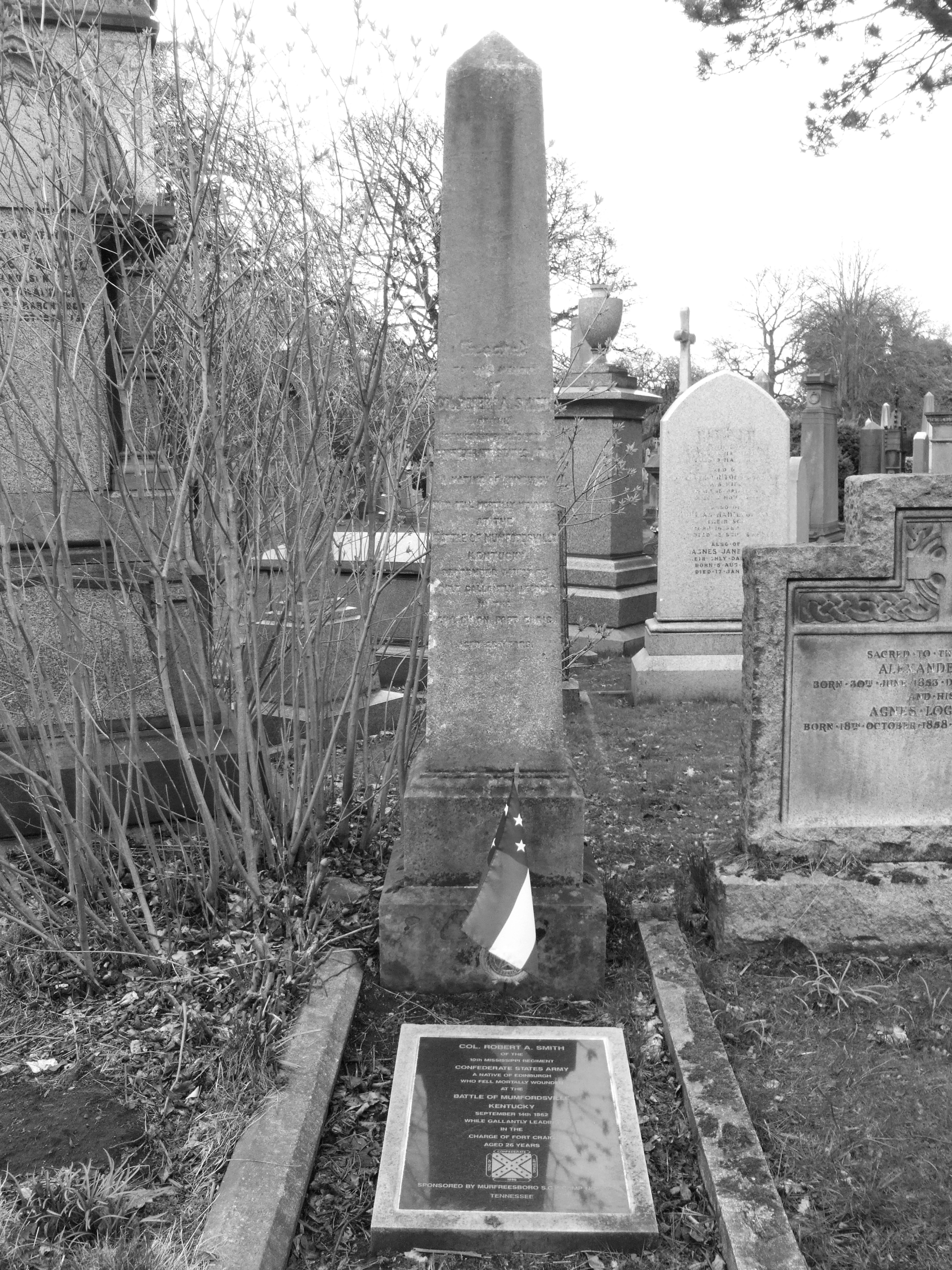
Another memorial to Colonel Robert A. Smith, CSA; this one is in the city of his birth in Edinburgh, Scotland

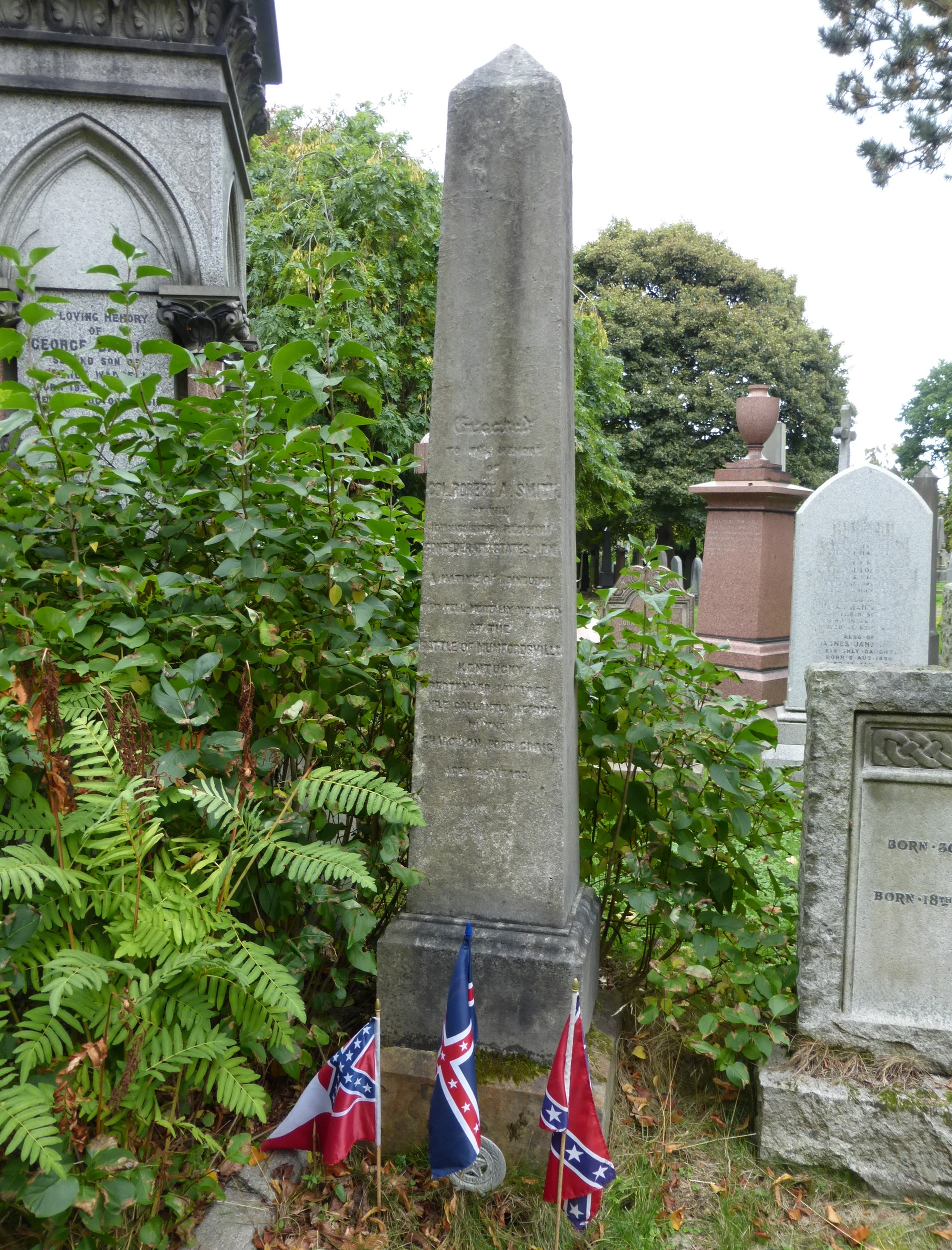
The Edinburgh memorial to Colonel Smith in 2013
