= Battle of Munfordville =

Battle of the American Civil War

- Part of the American Civil War
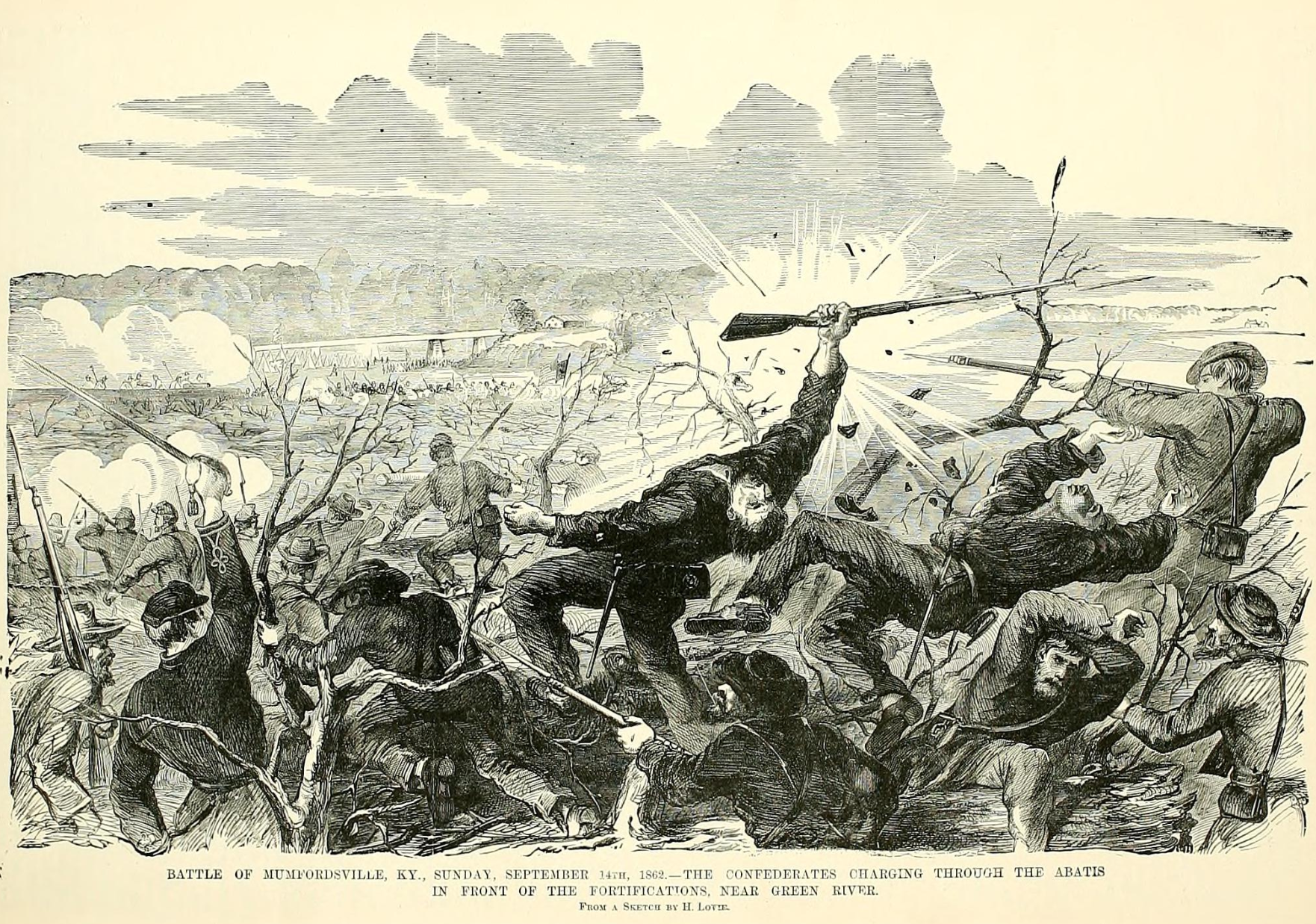
- Confederate troops attacking Union fortifications near Green River, September 14, 1862
| Date | September 14, 1862 – September 17, 1862 |
| Location | Hart County, Kentucky |
| Result | Confederate victory |

Belligerents
| United States (Union) | (Confederate States of America) CSA (Confederacy) |

Commanders and leaders
| John T. Wilder (surrendered); Cyrus L. Dunham | Simon Bolivar Buckner; James Ronald Chalmers |

Units involved
| Munfordville Garrison; Army of the Ohio | Army of Mississippi |

Casualties and losses
| 4,148 | 714 |

The Battle of Munfordville (also known as the Battle of Green River) was an engagement in Munfordville, Kentucky during the American Civil War. Victory there allowed the Confederates to temporarily strengthen their hold on the region and impair Union supply lines.

== Battle ==
On August 26, 1862, Confederate Gen. Braxton Bragg's army left Chattanooga, Tennessee and marched north through Sparta, TN and then to Glasgow, KY. Pursued by Maj. Gen. Don Carlos Buell's Union Army, Bragg approached Munfordville, a station on the Louisville & Nashville Railroad and the location of an 1,800 foot long railroad bridge crossing Green River, in mid-September. Col. John T. Wilder commanded the Union garrison at Munfordville, which consisted of three regiments behind extensive fortifications.

Wilder's force was first approached by Brig. Gen. James R. Chalmers who marched on Munfordville from Cave City, KY without orders. Chalmers had received an erroneous report from cavalry under Kirby Smith that the federal force in Munfordville had "not more than 1,800 men, entirely raw troops, and that they were fortifying their position, but that the railroad and telegraph had been destroyed in their rear, cutting them off completely from all communication and re-enforcements." Upon arriving on September 14, Chalmers demanded a surrender, which was rejected, and then proceeded to launch frontal assaults that were repulsed by the federal defenders. Chalmers' brigade suffered 288 casualties in the attacks before retreating back to Cave City.

Braxton Bragg was angry at Chalmers for his "unauthorized and injudicious" assault, but determined to force Munfordville's surrender nonetheless. Bragg believed that leaving Munfordville intact would "throw a gloom upon the whole army…[but forcing its surrender would] turn defeat into victory." Thus Bragg's army made a forced march of 25–35 miles the night of September 15–16 to Munfordville.

Late on September 16, realizing that Buell's forces were near and not wishing to kill or injure innocent civilians, the Confederates sent another demand for surrender. Wilder entered enemy lines under a flag of truce, and Confederate Maj. Gen. Simon B. Buckner escorted him to view the Confederate strength to convince him resistance was futile. Realizing the odds he faced (45 cannon and 25,000+ infantry), Wilder agreed to surrender. The formal ceremony took place the next day as the paroled federals marched out of Munfordville with new uniforms. W.L. Trask, a Confederate soldier, said the federals "were well clothed, looked fat and sleek and clean and neat and were in strange contrast to our own hungry, ragged and dirty looking rebels."

Despite the capture of over 4,000 federals and stores of supplies at Munfordville, the victory did little for the Confederates other than slow them down. Author Kenneth W. Noe said "Unless he [Bragg] intended to fight it out along the Green River, an idea that flickered only briefly under duress, Munfordville was a three-day distraction the Confederate cause could ill afford." The incident is a good example of how Bragg had little overall vision for the campaign and instead simply reacted from event to event.

== National Register of Historic Places ==
- Battle of Munfordville Site
- U.S. National Register of Historic Places
- Location within Kentucky Location within the United States
- Location: Roughly bounded by Green R., US 31, Rowletts, and L and N RR tracks, Munfordville, Kentucky
- Coordinates: 37.2622°N 85.8901°W
- Area: 164 acres (66 ha)
- Built: 1862
- Bridge designer: Albert Fink
- NRHP reference No.: 97000866
- Added to NRHP: October 15, 1999

Three places in the National Register of Historic Places are related to the battle.

=== Battle of Munfordville site ===
The entire battlefield is listed in the National Register as the Battle of Munfordville Site. This includes the Green River Bridge designed by Albert Fink and built by the Louisville & Nashville Railroad in 1859, Fort Craig, a union-built star shaped wood and earthen fort, a small cemetery at the northern edge of the battlefield, and other buildings existing at the time.

=== Smith Monument ===
The Colonel Robert A. Smith Monument near the river is part of the battlefield historic site and separately listed as well. A monument to Colonel Smith also exists in Dean Cemetery in his home town of Edinburgh, Scotland.

=== Unknown Soldier ===
The Unknown Confederate Soldier Monument in Horse Cave marks the grave of a Louisiana soldier accidentally killed while clearing timber for the Confederate advance.

== Battlefield Preservation ==
The American Battlefield Trust and its partners have acquired and preserved about 135 acres of the Munfordville Battlefield as of mid-2023.

== See also ==
- List of battles fought in Kentucky
