= 39th Iowa Infantry Regiment =

- Iowa state flag
- Active: November 24, 1862, to August 2, 1865
- Country: United States
- Allegiance: Union
- Branch: Infantry
- Engagements: Battle of Parker's Cross Roads; Battle of Resaca; Battle of Allatoona; March to the Sea; Campaign of the Carolinas; Battle of Bentonville

The 39th Iowa Infantry Regiment was an infantry regiment that served in the Union Army during the American Civil War.

== Service ==
The 39th Iowa Infantry was organized at Des Moines and Davenport, Iowa and mustered in for three years of Federal service on November 24, 1862.

Attached to 3rd Brigade, District of Corinth, 17th Army Corps, Dept. of Tennessee, to January, 1863. 3rd Brigade, District of Corinth, 16th Army Corps, to March, 1863. 3rd Brigade, 2nd Division, 16th Army Corps, to September, 1864. 3rd Brigade, 4th Division, 15th Army Corps, to August, 1865.

Moved to Cairo, Ill., December 12–14, 1862; thence to Columbus, Ky., December 16. Defense of Jackson, Tenn., and pursuit of Forrest December 18, 1862, to January 3, 1863. Parker's Cross Roads December 30–31, 1862.

Moved to Corinth, Miss., January 6, 1863, and duty there until November, 1863. Dodge's Expedition into Northern Alabama April 15-May 8. Great Bear Creek and Cherokee Station April 17. Tuscumbia April 22–23. Town Creek April 28.

March to Pulaski, Tenn., November 2–12, 1963. Guard duty at Reynolds Station and along railroad until January 21, 1864, and at Pulaski until March 12.

Moved to Athens, Ala., March 12, and to Chattanooga, Tenn., April 30, 1864.

Atlanta (Ga.) Campaign May 1 to September 8, 1864. Demonstration on Resaca May 8–13. Snake Creek Gap and Sugar Valley May 9–10. Battle of Resaca May 13–14. Ley's Ferry, Oostenaula River, May 14–15. Rome Cross Roads May 16. Kingston May 19. Moved to Rome May 22 and duty there until August 15. Expeditions after Wheeler August 15-September 16. Moved to Allatoona October 4. Battle of Allatoona October 5.

Moved to Rome October 9, 1864. Reconnaissance and skirmishes on Gave Springs Road October 12–13. Etowah River October 13.

March to the Sea November 15-December 10, 1864. Ogeechee Canal December 9. Siege of Savannah December 10–21.

Campaign of the Carolinas January to April, 1865. Salkehatchie Swamps, S.C. February 3–5. South Edisto River February 9. North Edisto River February 12–13. Columbia February 15–17. Lynch's Creek February 25–26. Battle of Bentonville N. C., March 20–21. Occupation of Goldsboro March 24 Advance on Raleigh April 9–13. Occupation of Raleigh April 14. Bennett's House April 26. Surrender of Johnston and his army.

March to Washington, D.C. via Richmond, Va., April 29-May 30, 1865. Grand Review May 24. Moved to Louisville, Ky., June.

The regiment was mustered out on August 2, 1865.

== Total strength and casualties ==
A total of 1064 men served in the 39th Iowa at one time or another during its existence. It suffered 6 officers and 58 enlisted men who were killed in action or who died of their wounds and 2 officers and 134 enlisted men who died of disease, for a total of 200 fatalities.

== Commanders ==
- Colonel Henry J. B. Cummings

== See also ==
- List of Iowa Civil War Units
- Iowa in the American Civil War
