= 27th Ohio Infantry Regiment =

- Active: July 15, 1861, to July 11, 1865
- Country: United States
- Allegiance: Union
- Branch: Union Army
- Type: Infantry
- Engagements: Battle of Island No. 10; Siege of Corinth; Battle of Iuka; Second Battle of Corinth; Atlanta campaign; Battle of Resaca; Battle of Dallas; Battle of New Hope Church; Battle of Allatoona; Battle of Kennesaw Mountain; Battle of Atlanta; Siege of Atlanta; Battle of Jonesboro; Battle of Lovejoy's Station; Sherman's March to the Sea; Carolinas campaign; Battle of Bentonville

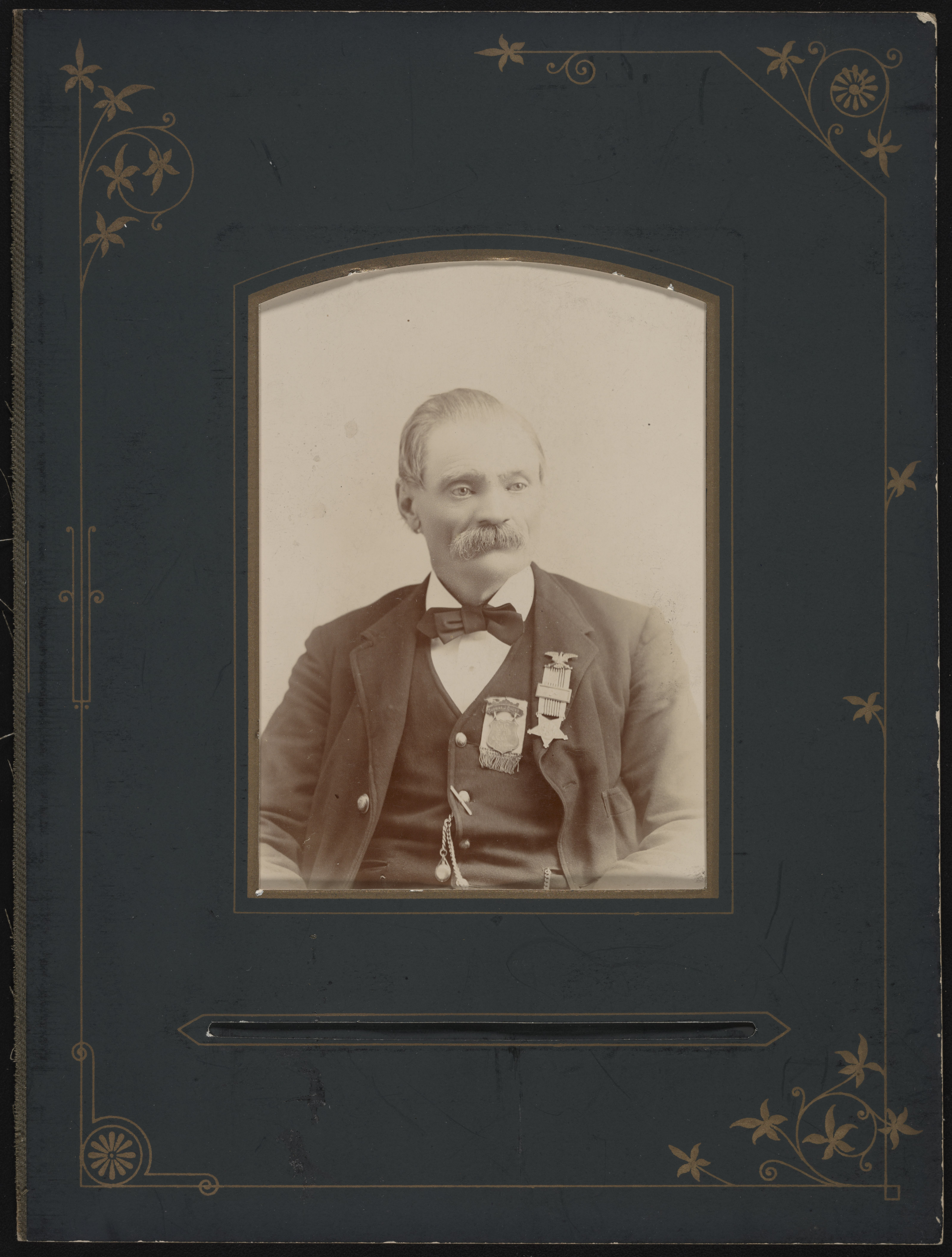
Union veteran Private Thomas J. Owens of Co. C, 27th Ohio Infantry Regiment. From the Liljenquist Family Collection of Civil War Photographs, Prints and Photographs Division, Library of Congress

The 27th Ohio Infantry Regiment was an infantry regiment in the Union Army during the American Civil War.

== Service ==
The 27th Ohio Infantry Regiment was organized at Camp Chase in Columbus, Ohio July 15 through August 18, 1861, and mustered in for three years service under the command of Colonel John Wallace Fuller.

The regiment was attached to Army of the West and Department of the Missouri, to February 1862. 1st Brigade, 1st Division, Army of the Mississippi, to April 1862. 1st Brigade, 2nd Division, Army of the Mississippi, to November 1862. 1st Brigade, 8th Division, Left Wing, XIII Corps, Department of the Tennessee, to December 1862. 1st Brigade, 8th Division, XVI Corps, to March 1863. 4th Brigade, District of Corinth, Mississippi, 2nd Division, XVI Corps, to May 1863. 3rd Brigade, District of Memphis, Tennessee, 5th Division, XVI Corps, to November 1863. Fuller's 4th Brigade, 2nd Division, XVI Corps, to March 1864. 1st Brigade, 4th Division, XVI Corps, to September 1864. 1st Brigade, 1st Division, XVII Corps, to July 1865.

The 27th Ohio Infantry mustered out of service at Louisville, Kentucky, on July 11, 1865.

== Detailed service ==
Left Ohio for St. Louis, Mo., August 20, then moved to Mexico, Mo., and duty on the St. Joseph Railroad until September 12. March to relief of Col. Mulligan at Lexington, Mo., September 12–20. Fremont's advance on Springfield, Mo., October 15-November 2, 1861. March to Sedalia, Mo., November 9–17. Duty there and at Syracuse until February 1862. Expedition to Milford December 15–19, 1861. Blackwater, Mo., December 18. Moved to St. Louis, Mo., February 2, 1862, then to Commerce, Mo. Siege operations against New Madrid, Mo., March 3–14. Picket affair March 12. Siege and capture of Island No. 10, Mississippi River, and pursuit to Tiptonville March 15-April 8. Expedition to Fort Pillow, Tenn., April 13–17. Moved to Hamburn Landing, Tenn., April 18–22. Action at Monterey April 29. Advance on and siege of Corinth, Miss., April 29-May 30. Reconnaissance toward Corinth May 8. Occupation of Corinth and pursuit to Booneville May 30-June 12. Duty at Corinth until August. Battle of Iuka September 19. Reconnaissance from Rienzi to Hatchie River September 30. Battle of Corinth October 3–4. Pursuit to Ripley October 5–12. Grant's Central Mississippi Campaign November 2, 1862, to January 12, 1863. Expedition to Jackson December 18, 1862. Action at Parker's Cross Roads December 30. Red Mound or Parker's Cross Roads December 31. Duty at Corinth until April 1863. Dodge's Expedition to northern Alabama April 15-May 8. Rock Cut, near Tuscumbia, April 22. Tuscumbia April 23. Town Creek April 28. Duty at Memphis, Tenn., until October, and at Prospect, Tenn., until February 1864. Atlanta Campaign May 1-September 8. Demonstrations on Resaca May 8–13. Sugar Valley, near Resaca, May 9. Near Resaca May 13. Battle of Resaca May 14–15. Advance on Dallas May 18–25. Operations on line of Pumpkin Vine Creek and battles about Dallas, New Hope Church and Allatoona Hills May 25-June 5. Operations about Marietta and against Kennesaw Mountain June 10-July 2. Assault on Kennesaw June 27. Nickajack Creek July 2–5. Ruff's Mills July 3–4. Chattahoochie River July 6–17. Battle of Atlanta July 22. Siege of Atlanta July 22-August 25. Flank movement on Jonesboro August 25–30. Battle of Jonesboro August 31-September 1. Lovejoy's Station September 2–6. Duty at Marietta until October. Pursuit of Hood into Alabama October 3–26. March to the sea November 10. Montieth Swamp December 9. Siege of Savannah December 10–21. Campaign of the Carolinas January to April 1865. Reconnaissance to Salkehatchie River, S.C., January 20. Salkehatchie Swamp February 3–5. River's Bridge, Salkehatchie River, February 3. Binnaker's Bridge February 9. Orangeburg February 11–13. Columbia February 16–17. Juniper Creek, near Cheraw, March 3. Battle of Bentonville, N.C., March 20–21. Occupation of Goldsboro and Raleigh. Bennett's House April 26. Surrender of Johnston and his army. March to Washington, D.C., via Richmond, Va., April 29-May 20. Grand Review of the Armies May 24. Moved to Louisville, Ky., June, and duty there until July.

== Casualties ==
The regiment lost a total of 214 men during service; 6 officers and 80 enlisted men killed or mortally wounded, 6 officers and 122 enlisted men died of disease.

== Commanders ==
- Colonel John Wallace Fuller

== See also ==
- List of Ohio Civil War units
- Ohio in the Civil War
