= John Doc Fuller =

John Doc Fuller is a prison coach, motivational speaker, and author.

Fuller served as Martha Stewart's prison coach in 2004, following her conviction for conspiracy, obstruction of an agency proceeding, and making false statements to federal investigators, which led to her five-month sentence in a federal correctional facility.

== Personal life ==
Fuller has personally experienced incarceration, serving time for forgery and a 10-year sentence for conspiracy to distribute cocaine, from which he was released in 2002.

== Public speaking ==
Fuller regularly speaks at universities, high schools, community-based programs, businesses and nonprofit organizations in his capacity as a prison coach.

On March 27, 2015, Fuller was interviewed about his work on Entertainment Tonight by presenter Nischelle Turner. When asked what his clients were most scared about, he said: "Will I be raped? Will I be killed? [I tell them] likely no, but hopefully I can help you avoid situations where that might occur."

Commenting on the case of former Senator Joseph Coniglio, Fuller has said: "My first piece of advice to [Coniglio] would be to forget his entire life as a senator, because now he is simply an inmate. And inmates don't care who you are. No longer will he snap his finger and someone will jump for him. He'll be respectful at all times."

== Book ==
His book The Ten Prison Commandments: The Ten Rules You Must Know Before You Enter a County Jail, State or Federal Prison was published on January 10, 2014.

Fuller's second book A Day In Prison: An Insider's Guide to Life Behind Bars was published by Skyhorse Publishing in 2017.
