= Mobile campaign =

A mobile campaign is a campaign, usually marketing, advertising, or public relations-related, through which organizations contact their audience through SMS (text messaging). This form of campaigning allows organizations to reach out and establish relationships with an audience in a more individualized, intimate way. The foundational function of mobile campaigns is regularly referred to as mobile marketing. A campaign's goal can have varied consumer consumption objectives including flashing (showing an image), informing (informational text / product info) or engaging (response or click required). Mobile campaigns have developed from the periphery of advertising to being an integral part of an effective marketing strategy. Online advertising is the second largest advertising spend at $113 billion, next to television's $196.5 billion (2013 figures). Near the introduction of mobile campaigns, they were primarily created to boost the impact of primary campaigns. A good example of one of the first mobile campaigns is the viewer voting system employed in American Idol. Using the American Idol example, the primary campaign was television, and the engagement was mobile, “watch this show, and text to vote”. In 2012, there were over 131 million votes in a single night, setting the world mobile voting record. With over 90% of Americans having cell phones, and there being over 6.8 billion cell phones in circulation globally versus 2.4 billion with internet access, mobile campaigns are evolving to be the way of the future in advertising and consumer engagement.

As advertisers enhance existing strategies to reach potential customers, technological advances create new ways for consumers and corporations to interact. New technologies are being developed to maximize the effectiveness of one's mobile device as a personal marketing platform including the facilitation of the GPS enabled smart-phone to provide location-based services and near by coupons. Elements of mobile campaigns can be distributed by advertisements in apps, text messages or emails and can include a combination of the following:

- Text to Vote:
  - This method of mobile user engagement involves there being a list of choices provided by a content provider for a consumer to vote on. This can be from a television show, movie theater, baseball game or other.
- Text to Win:
  - Provides mobile users the opportunity to text their information to a pre-set number as a ballot to be entered to win a prize.
- Click to Call:
  - An sms, email or app alert is sent to a mobile user, generally with a telephone number to make a one touch connection point possible. Advertisers find this a great way to inform customers about their products or to enter into a conversation about the list of products they offer.
- Click to order brochures:
  - Users have the option of receiving additional printed or promotional materials by providing their email address or postal code and additional information.
- Click to receive mobile coupons:
  - Mobile users have the opportunity to receive coupons from a content provider based on user specified data or directly related to an advertisement. (The app FourSquare has become a popular GPS based coupon delivery system).
- Click to buy:
  - Mobile users receive a link or direct access to purchasing a product or service which may include some form of mobile, credit card or Paypayl-type payment.
- Click to download content:
  - Mobile users download content from content provider. This may include mobile applications, ringtones, wallpaper, etc. This is very popular for an exchange of offering personal data, “checking in” or completing a survey or viewing advertising.
- Click to enter branded mobile websites: Mobile users click a banner to get connected to a campaign-specific mobile website.
  - Click to forward content: Mobile users are given the option to forward content or advertising to a contact, creating a viral campaign effect.
- Click / text to donate:
  - Nonprofits received government permission in 2005 (Canada, US, Mexico, UK) to begin ‘Text to Donate’ programs where mobile users could text a message to a special number to make a donation that would then be applied to their phone bill. One of the most successful campaigns in the world was “Haiti” where the American Red Cross raised over $32,000,000 for Haiti Relief.
