= John W. Fuller =

American general

John Wallace Fuller
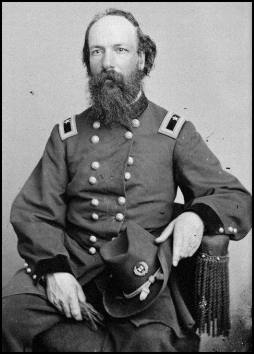
- John Wallace Fuller
- Born: July 28, 1827; Harston, England
- Died: March 12, 1891 (aged 63); Toledo, Ohio
- Burial place: Woodlawn Cemetery, Toledo, Ohio
- Military career
- Allegiance: United States of America; Union
- Branch: United States Army; Union Army
- Service years: 1861–1865
- Rank: Brevet Major General
- Commands: 27th Ohio Infantry
- Conflicts: American Civil War

John Wallace Fuller (July 28, 1827 – March 12, 1891) was a British-born American publisher, businessman, and soldier. He served as a general in the Union Army during the American Civil War. After the war, Fuller engaged in the wholesale footwear trade as well as in civil affairs in Ohio.

== Early life and career ==
John W. Fuller was born in the village of Harston, located in the English county of Cambridgeshire. His father was a minister of the Baptist faith and also a graduate of Bristol College in England, and was responsible for much of Fuller's primary education. In 1833, Fuller relocated with the family to Oneida County, New York. There, the rest of his education came from reading in a bookstore in Utica, and starting in 1841, Fuller began working there.

By 1852, Fuller owned and operated a publishing business in Utica and was later the city's treasurer. He was also active in the New York State Militia, serving as an officer. In 1853, Fuller married Anna B. Rathbun, also a resident of Utica. The couple would have six children together: three sons named Edward, Rathbun, and Frederick, and three daughters named Florence (later married to Thomas A. Taylor), Jennie, and Irene. In 1858, Fuller's business was destroyed by a fire, and he moved to Toledo, Ohio, where he again began operating a book publishing firm.

== Civil War service ==
When the American Civil War began in 1861, Fuller chose to follow his home state and the Union cause. He was ordered to train soldiers in Grafton, Virginia, which is in modern-day Taylor County, West Virginia. He also briefly served on the staff of Brig. Gen. Charles W. Hill. On August 18, Fuller was given command of the 27th Ohio Infantry with the rank of colonel. Fuller and the 27th first served in Missouri under Brig. Gens. John Pope and David Hunter. He and his command then participated in Pope's efforts at New Madrid on March 14, and then the Battle of Island Number Ten from February 28 to April 8, 1862.

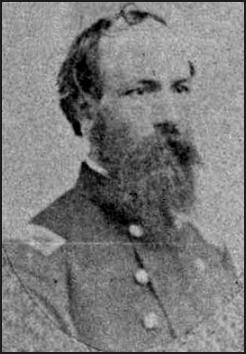
Fuller as a Union colonel

In the fall of 1862, Fuller was given brigade command in the Army of the Mississippi. He led it in Mississippi during the Battle of Iuka on September 19, and the Second Battle of Corinth on October 3–4. On December 31, his command fought at Battle of Parker's Cross Roads in Tennessee. During the battle, Fuller's brigade approached undetected and got behind Confederate Brig. Gen. Nathan Bedford Forrest's position. Left with no choice but to attack the Federal forces in his front and rear, Forrest had his men charge and repel Fuller's command, and then quickly reverse and move past and through the rest of the Union soldiers. Fuller and the other Federal units managed to capture six pieces of artillery, about 300 prisoners and 350 horses, but Forrest's scattered men were able to escape and recrossed the Tennessee River four days later.

Fuller spent most 1863 on garrison duty within the Army of the Tennessee, and was promoted to brigadier general on January 5, 1864. In March 1864, Fuller led his command across the Tennessee River and captured the city of Decatur, Alabama. He participated in the Atlanta campaign that summer, and temporarily lead a division during the Battle of Atlanta on July 22. He again led his brigade during the March to the Sea in late 1864, and in the Carolinas campaign of 1865. Fuller was brevetted to the rank of major general in the Union Army on March 13, and after the end of the war he resigned that fall.

Fuller was one of the few generals in the Civil War who was not born in the United States.

== Postbellum ==
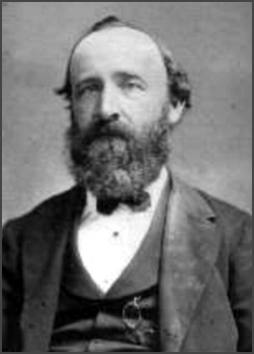
John Wallace Fuller

Fuller resigned from the Union Army on August 15, 1865, and returned to his civilian life in Ohio. He was the senior partner of the firm Fuller, Childs & Company in Toledo, a business dealing in the wholesale of boots and shoes. In 1874, Fuller was appointed the collector of customs for Toledo, a post he held until 1881.

On October 3–4, 1878, the members of the "Ohio Brigade" held a reunion at Columbus, Ohio, in which Fuller attended and made a speech. During the event, a permanent organization was created for future reunions, with Fuller as its first president. In 1888, he retired from his business concerns.

Fuller was in Toledo when he died in 1891 and he was buried in the city's Woodlawn Cemetery.

== See also ==
- List of American Civil War generals (Union)
