= Robert Ingersoll Birthplace =

Historic house in New York, United States

- U.S. National Register of Historic Places
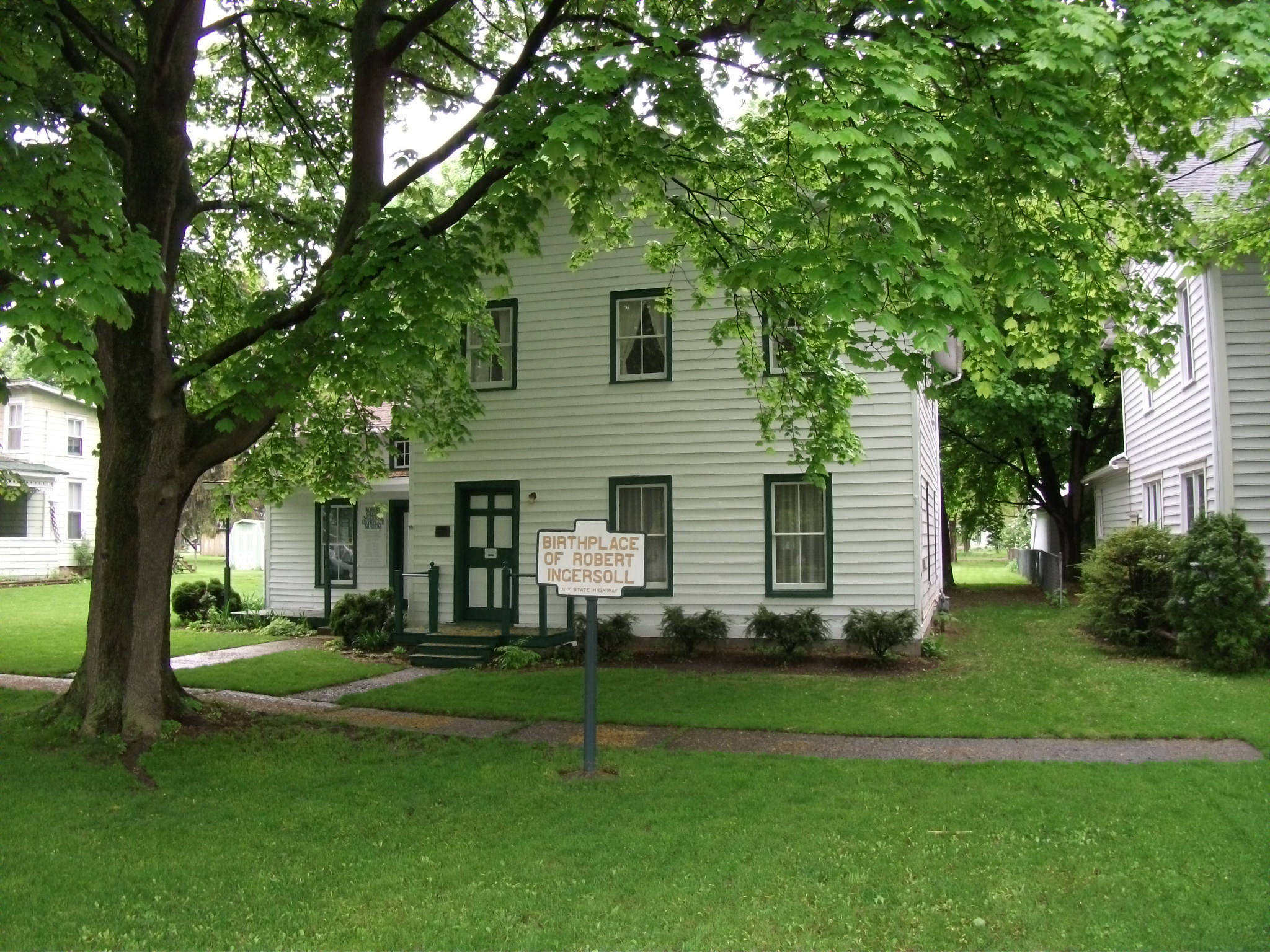
- Robert Ingersoll Birthplace, May 2011

- Location within New York Location within the United States
- Location: Main St., Dresden, New York
- Coordinates: 42°41′03″N 76°57′22″W
- Area: less than one acre
- Built: 1833
- Architectural style: Federal
- NRHP reference No.: 88000110
- Added to NRHP: February 11, 1988

Robert Ingersoll Birthplace, also known as Robert Green Ingersoll Birthplace Museum, is a historic home located at Dresden in Yates County, New York. It is a Federal-style structure that consists of a two-story, three-bay, gable-roofed central block with a two-part, 1 1/2-story saltbox ell on the west side. The central block and the front portion of the ell were built separately and joined sometime before they were moved to their present location prior to 1833. The rear portion of the ell was added on-site at the current location at an unknown date.

The house was the birthplace of noted agnostic and politician Robert G. Ingersoll (1833–1899). It was listed on the National Register of Historic Places in 1988, and added to New York State's Register of Historic Places in 1987.

== History of the home ==
The central block was built circa 1800 as a Congregational church parsonage. It was originally located on Charles Street in Dresden, a few hundred feet south and east of its current location. It was constructed of donated materials by volunteer labor. The front portion of the ell was built circa 1800 in Hopeton, a settlement two miles east of Dresden which failed early in the nineteenth century. Several buildings were moved downhill to Dresden, presumably by sledge during a snowy winter. The front portion of the ell and the central block were united on the current Main Street site sometime prior to 1833 and the rear portion of the ell added on-site.

== Ingersoll ==
Robert Green Ingersoll was born here while his father, the Rev. John Ingersoll, was employed as pastor of Dresden's Congregational Church. During that time his family resided in the parsonage. A staunch abolitionist well before this position became popular in the North, Rev. Ingersoll tended not to hold a ministerial appointment very long, and his tenure in Dresden was no exception. The Ingersolls left Dresden when baby Robert was but four months old. Given Robert's brief residence, one might question the appropriateness of placing an Ingersoll museum at the birthplace. This Dresden house is the only one of Robert Ingersoll's residences now standing. For this reason the Dresden building has been celebrated by freethinkers since shortly after his death. Upon Ingersoll's death in 1899, his brother-in-law and official publisher Charles P. Farrell launched the Dresden Publishing Company, named for the village of his birth, to publish a multi-volume set of Ingersoll's collected works. When published in 1900, the first volume bore an engraving of the birthplace. The birthplace has been restored and opened as an Ingersoll museum three times. In 1921 a large committee including Thomas Edison, Luther Burbank, Edgar Lee Masters, and members of the Ingersoll family opened the birthplace as a museum, community house, and public library. The facility closed during the Depression and fell into disrepair. In 1954, a committee led by atheist activist Joseph Lewis restored the building again and operated it as an Ingersoll museum for several years.

== Current museum ==
Tom Flynn designed the freethought museum at the birthplace of nineteenth century agnostic orator, and was its director from the time it opened to the public in 1993 until his death in 2021.

In 1986 the birthplace, a two-story frame house in the small village of Dresden (pop. 300), was badly deteriorated. CODESH Inc., as the Council for Secular Humanism was then known, purchased the property for $7,000 and pressed successfully for its inclusion on the National Register of Historic Places. Some $250,000 was then raised from grant-makers and the public; between 1987 and 1991 the house was stabilized and rehabilitated. Though Flynn was employed at CODESH during this period he was not closely involved with the purchase and rehabilitation, which were orchestrated primarily by chairman Paul Kurtz, then-Free Inquiry editor Tim Madigan, and colleague Richard Seymour. In 1992 it was decided to establish a museum at the birthplace, and Flynn was chosen to develop the museum. Flynn tells D.J. Grothe on Point of Inquiry, "He [Ingersoll] literally was seen or heard by more Americans than would see or hear any other human being until the advent of motion pictures or radio."

The Robert Green Ingersoll Birthplace Museum opened on Memorial Day weekend in 1993. The Museum has been open to the public on weekends each summer and fall ever since. Conspicuous developments have included, in 2001, installation of a large bust of Ingersoll that had decorated a Dowagiac, Michigan, theater razed in 1968. In 2003, a historically accurate front porch was added by volunteer contractor (and Ingersoll descendant) Jeff Ingersoll. In that year the Museum also adopted its current tagline, referring to Ingersoll as "the most remarkable American most people never heard of," a reference to his near-exclusion from history by religious detractors. In 2004 a lost grand march titled Ingersolia, composed by prolific Gilded Age composer George Schleiffarth (died 1921), was rediscovered and its score displayed at the Museum. In 2005 two interpretive Web sites made their debut: a virtual tour of the Ingersoll Museum and a celebration of freethought and radical reform history within a rough 100-mile radius of the Ingersoll Museum, the Freethought Trail. In 2008 the large commemorative plaque marking the location of Ingersoll's New York City residence, removed from the Gramercy Park Hotel when that property was rehabilitated as a boutique hotel, was installed in the Museum. In 2009, the current high-definition widescreen orientation video was installed, featuring the Ingersolia March unearthed in 2004. In 2009 the Museum received a large number of artifacts and papers from the estate of Eva Ingersoll Wakefield, Robert Ingeroll's, last surviving granddaughter. Selected items were displayed beginning in 2010.

In 2014, the museum interior was fully renovated. Display cases were refurbished and all-new interpretive signage was developed, including professionally designed mural-sized wall graphics. A formerly private room on the second floor was added to the public display space. The new interior was named the T. M. Scruggs Museum Interior, honoring the largest donor to a 2013 capital campaign to fund the renovation.

Images from Ingersoll Birthplace Museum
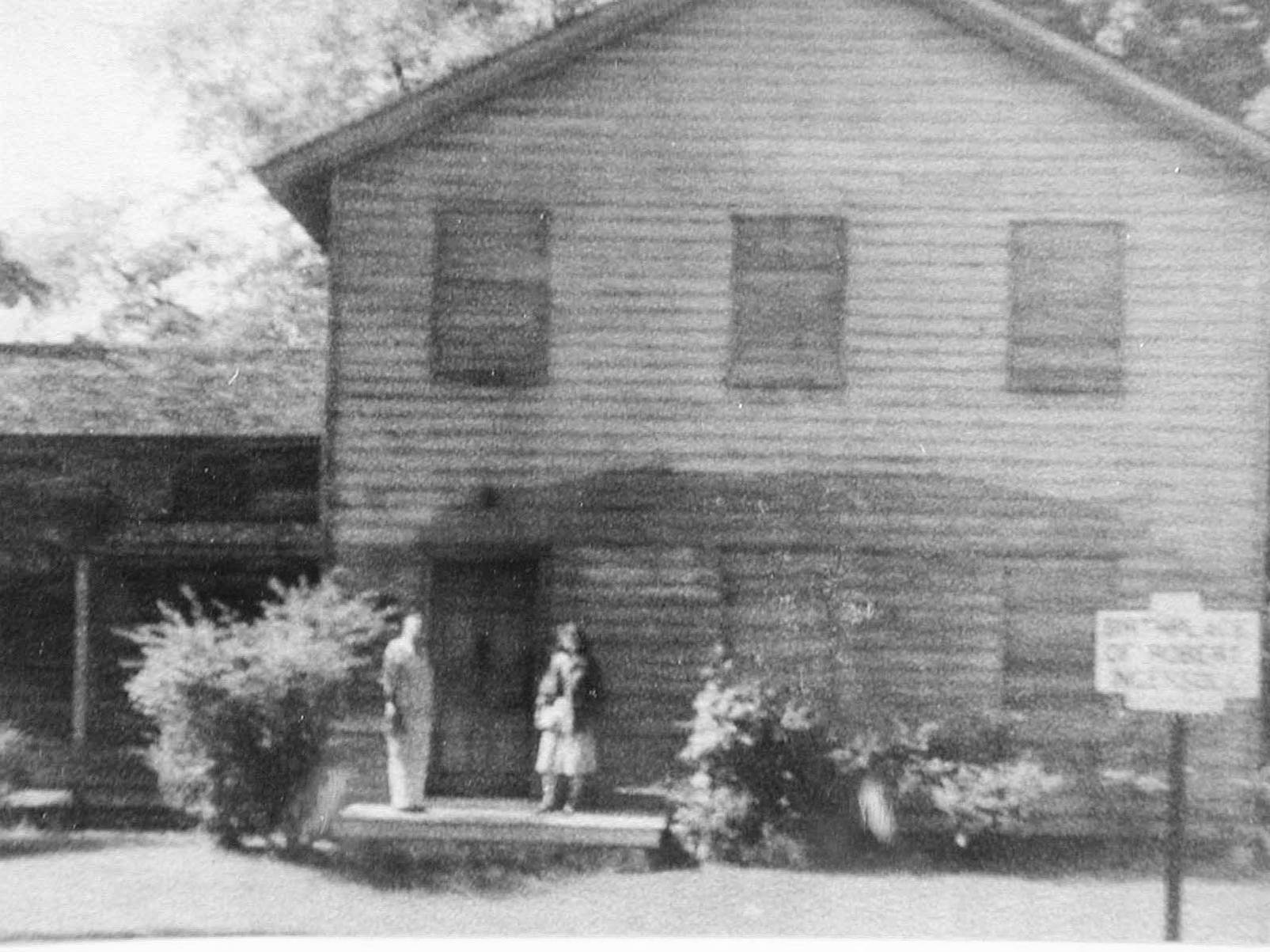
Undated photo from the early 1950s shows the Robert Green Ingersoll birthplace prior to its 1954 restoration by Joseph L. Lewis's organization. The man and woman are Arthur and Ruth Cromwell, husband-and-wife freethinkers from Rochester, New York, who served as Lewis's primary agents for much of the restoration work. Their daughter, Vashti McCollum, had been the plaintiff in McCollum v. Board of Education

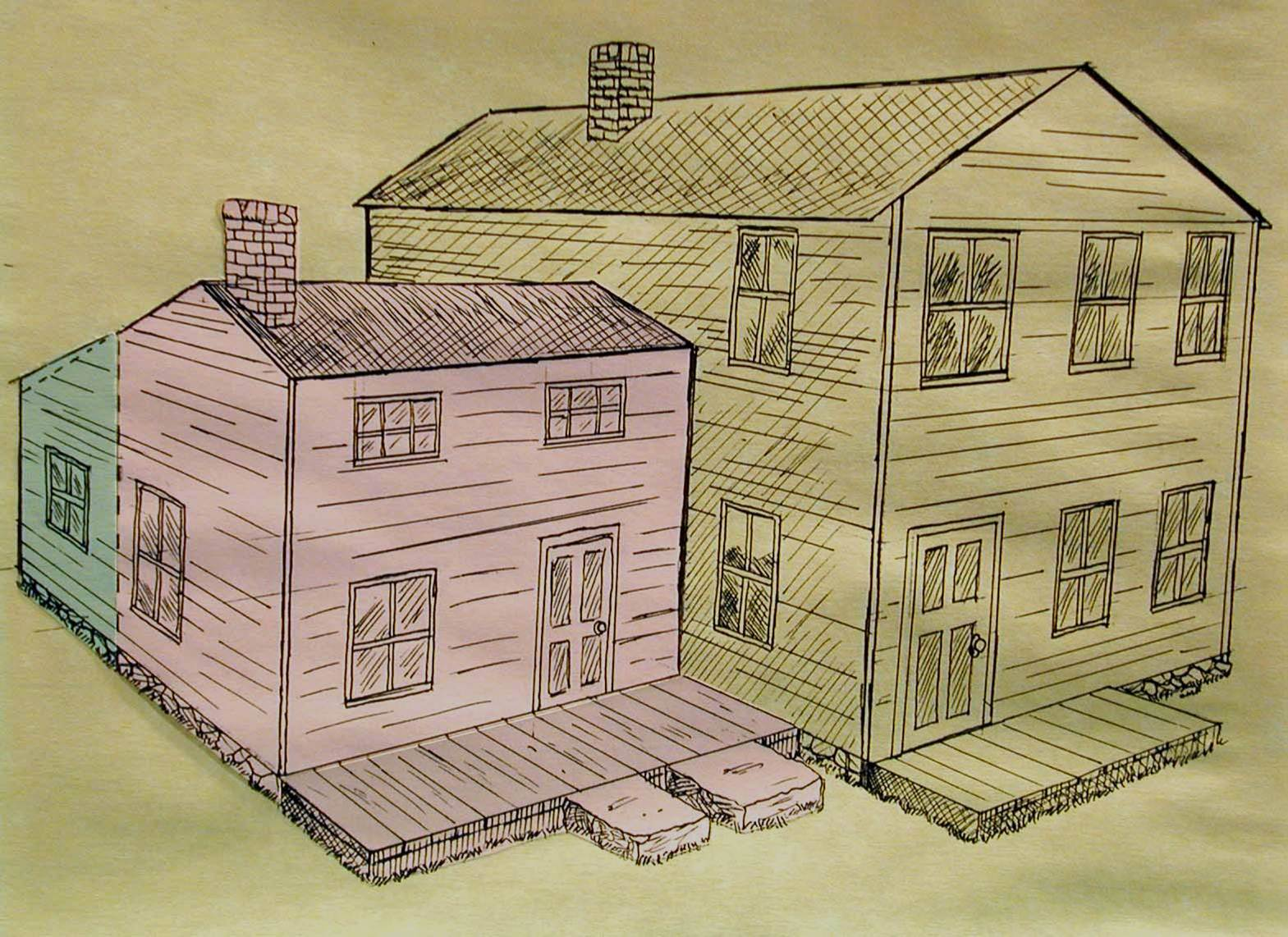
The birthplace was built in three sections. The central block (beige) was built circa 1800 on a lot about 500 feet southeast of the building's current location. The saltbox ell (pink) originally stood in the failed village of Hopeton; prior to Robert Ingersoll's birth it was sledged downhill to Dresden and mated to the central block on its original site. At some time after Ingersoll's birth in 1833, the central block and ell were moved to their current location and the rear portion (green) was added on that site.

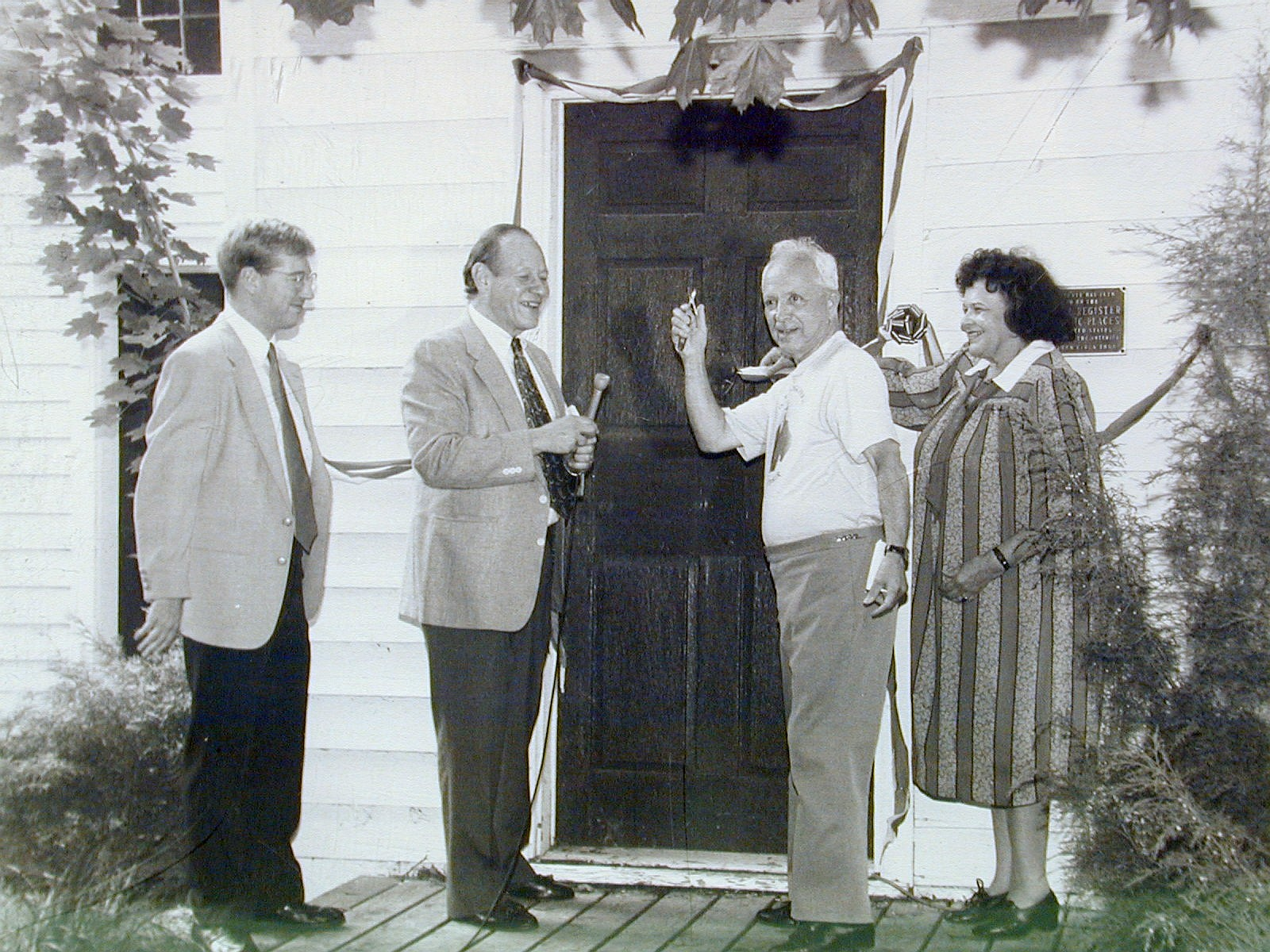
Completion of the physical rehabilitation of the Robert Green Ingersoll Birthplace Museum (Dresden, New York) was observed at a dedication on Free Inquiry’s birthday, August 11, 1988. Left to right: Tim Madigan, then director of the Robert Ingersoll Memorial Committee and editor of Free Inquiry Magazine; Paul Kurtz, founder and chair of the Council for Democratic and Secular Humanism, as the organization was then known; the late Phil Mass, founding chair of the Memorial Committee; and Jean Millholland, founding executive director of the Council.

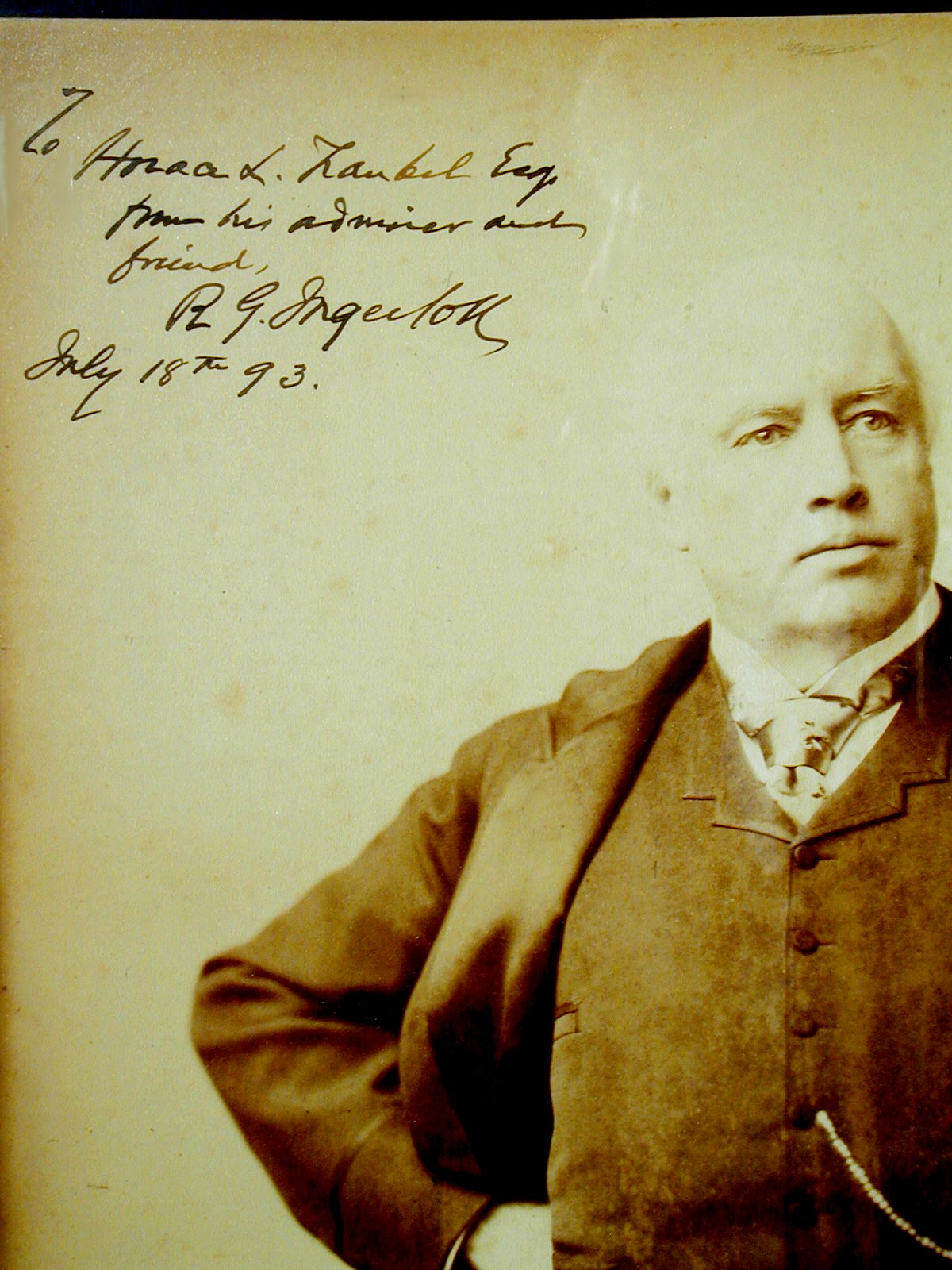
This large photo of Ingersoll was once owned by the late Virginia atheist activist Arnold Via. It bears a bold Ingersoll autograph to fellow lawyer Horace Traubel, dated 1893. The original 19th-century photograph is in the public domain.

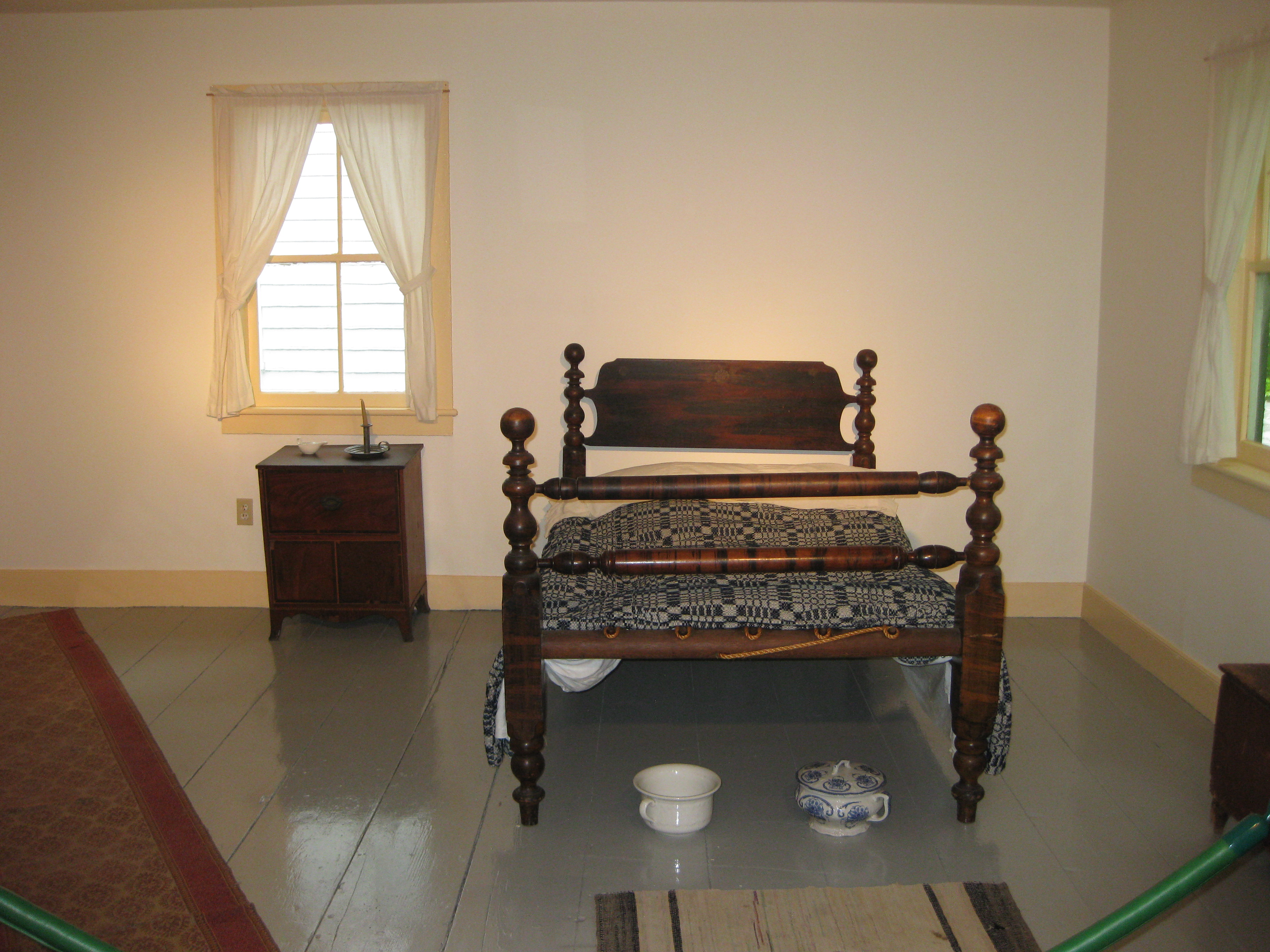
The room where Robert Ingersoll was born is furnished with period furniture of the sort that might have been owned by a struggling minister's family.

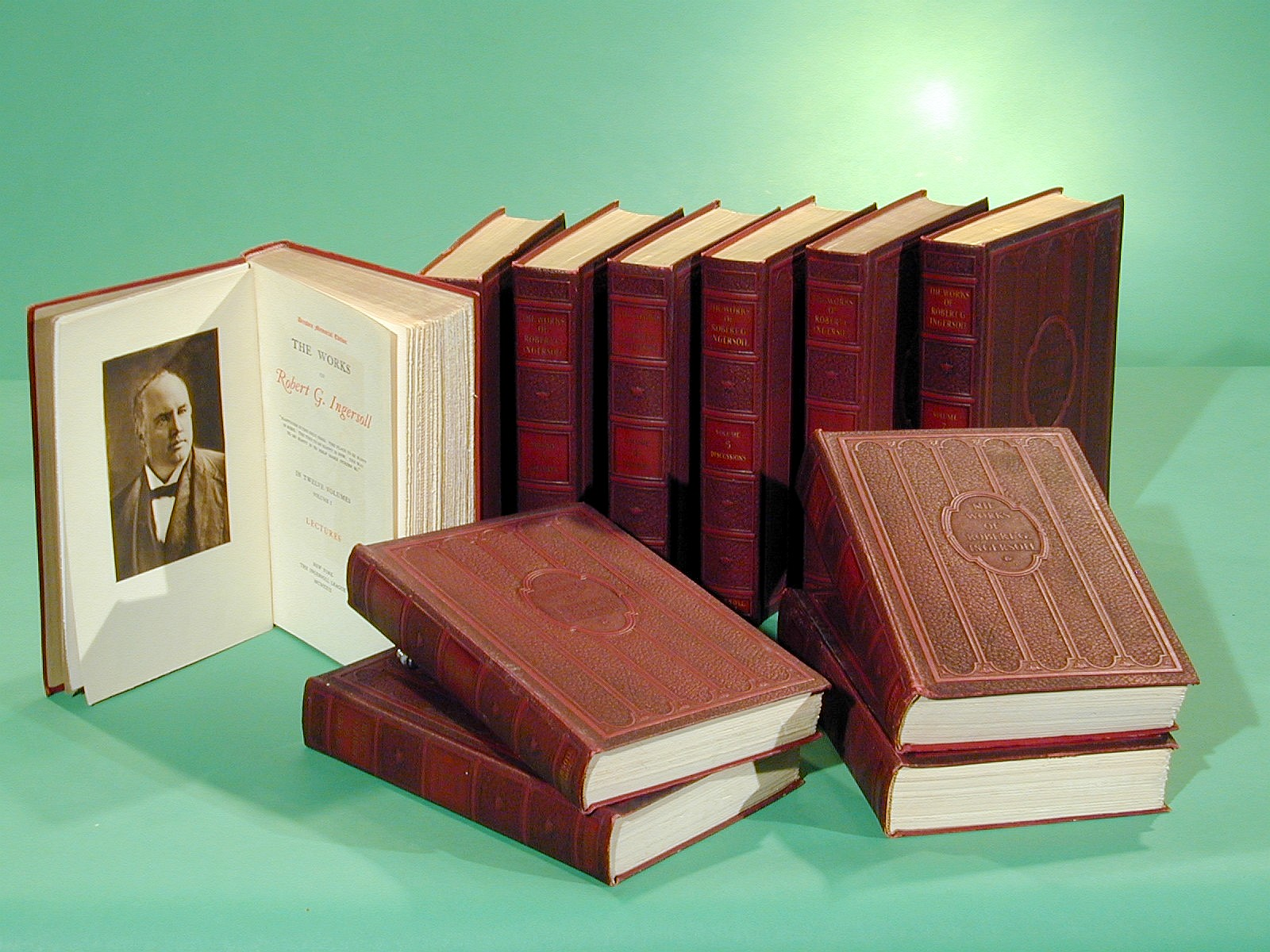
Robert Green Ingersoll’s collected works were published in 1900 by the New York City-based Dresden Publishing Company. The name was a tribute to his birthplace. The Works, first in 12 volumes, later 13, were continually in print from 1900 through 1929.

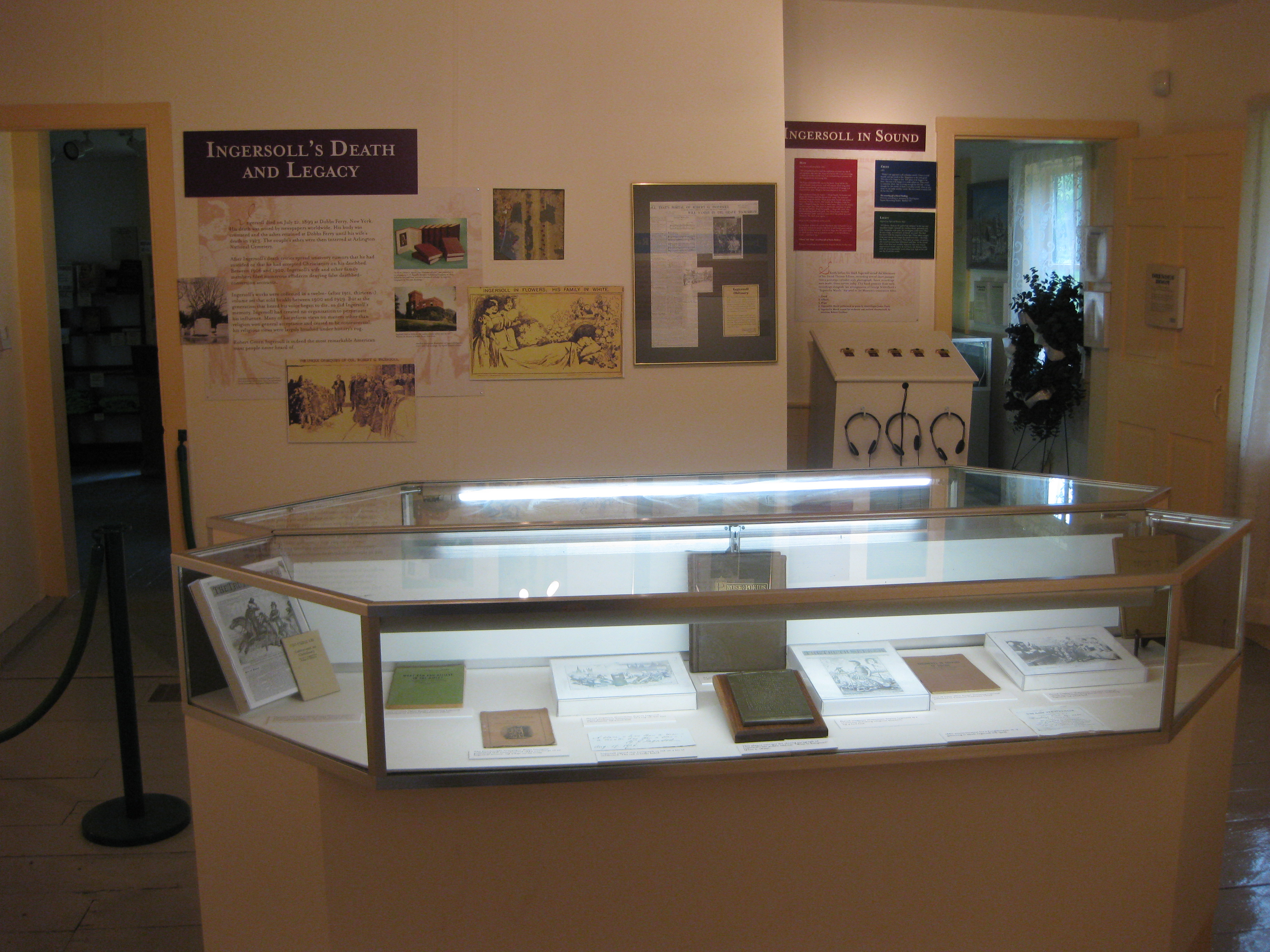
The second main display room at the museum. On the door at center is an extremely rare original poster promoting an Ingersoll speech; such posters were usually printed on high-acid pulp paper and very few have survived. To right of the door is a photo of Ingersoll’s poem in praise of Robert Burns, written when he visited the Burns cottage in Scotland. It is the only poem not by Burns to be displayed at the cottage.

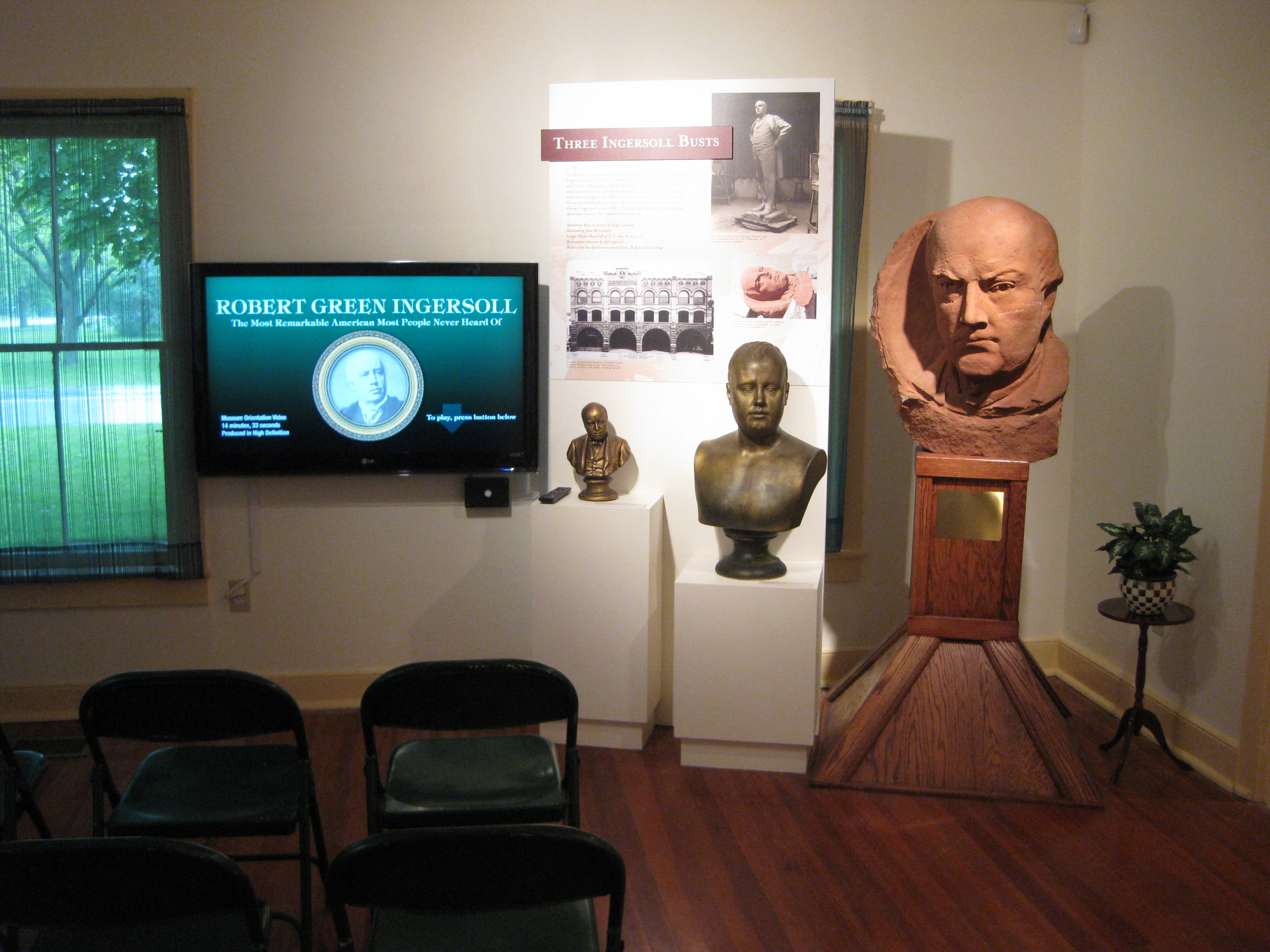
Anchoring the Piano Room are the Museum's orientation video and three historic busts of Robert Green Ingersoll.

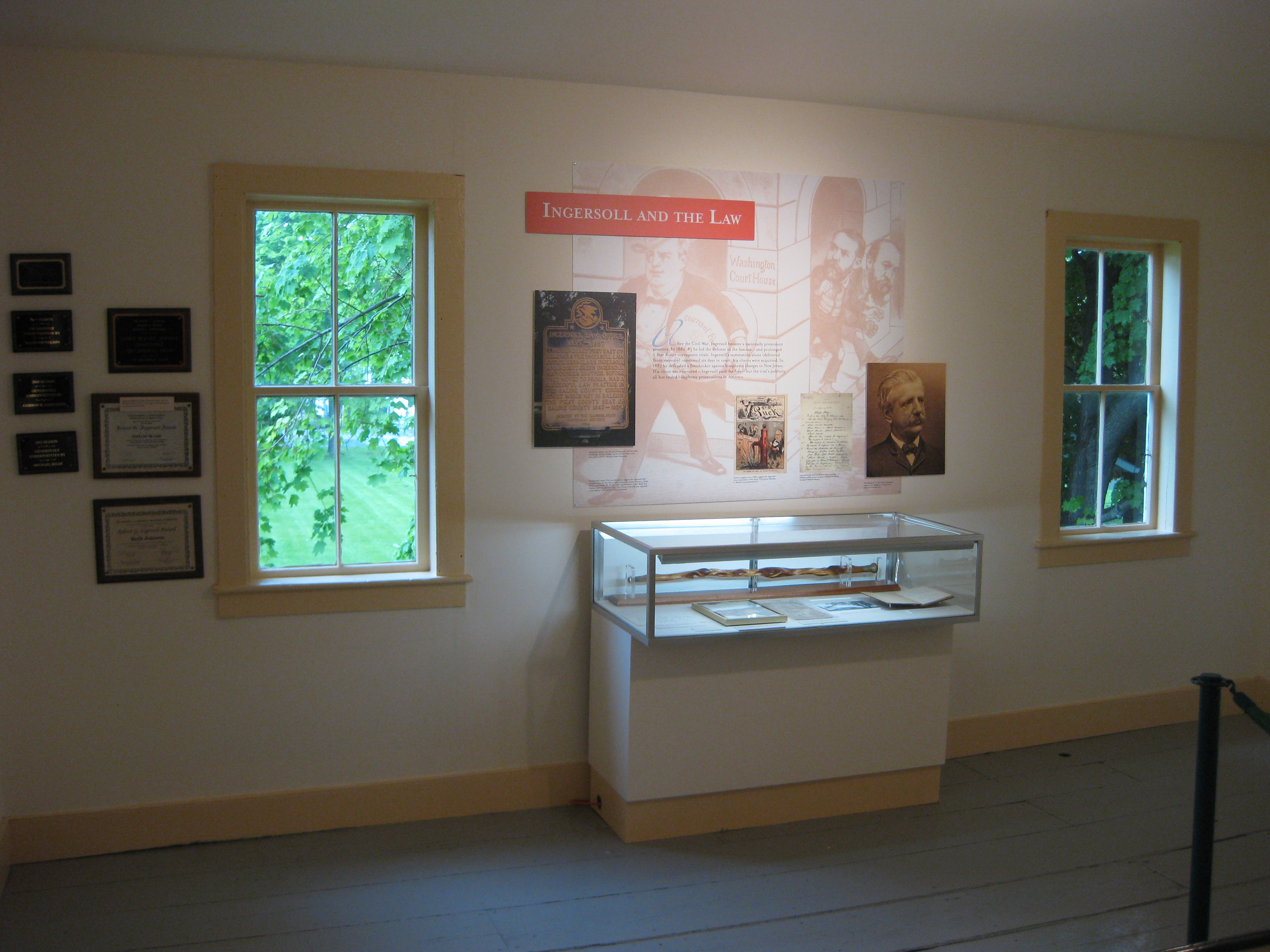
An upstairs room newly opened to the public, displays focus on Ingersoll's birth and youth, his Civil War service, and his law career.

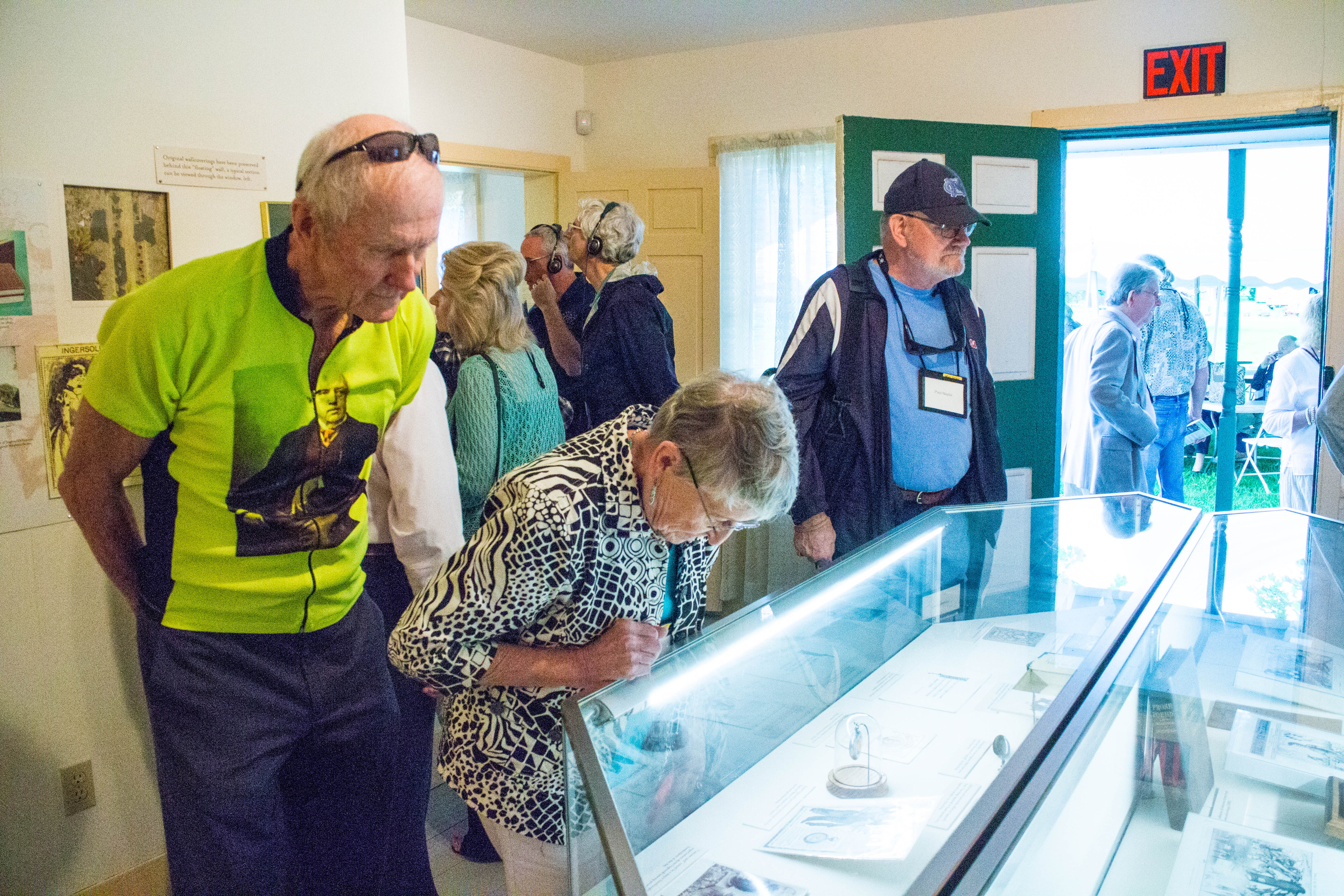
Visitors to the Robert Green Ingersoll Birthplace Museum view artifacts in the newly-refreshed display cases. At rear, visitors listen to early Edison recordings of Ingersoll himself reciting highlights of his lectures. Photo by Monica Harmsen.

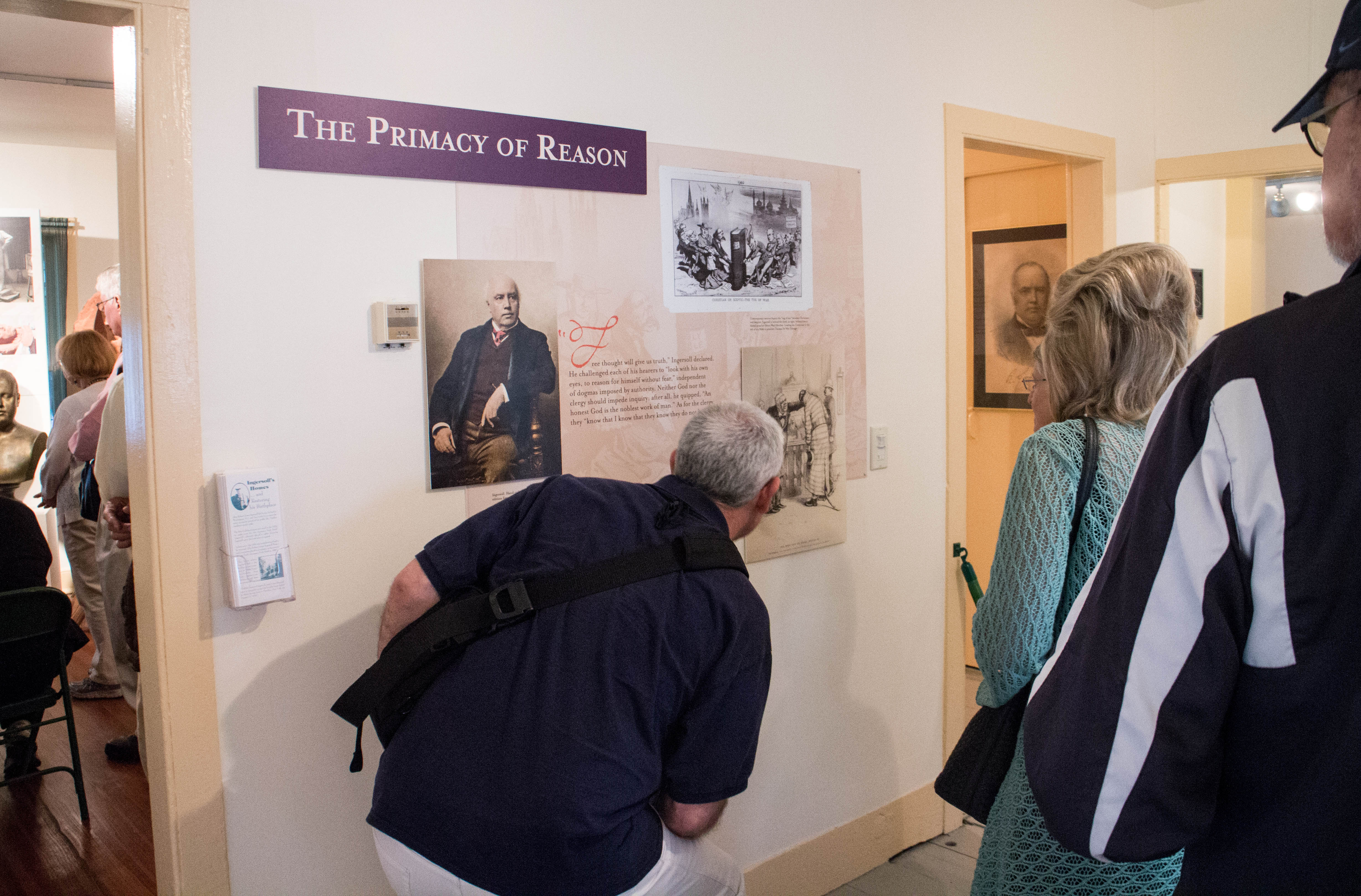
Visitors to the Robert Green Ingersoll Birthplace Museum study the new wall graphics, part of the T. M. Scruggs Museum Interior installed for the 2014 season. Photo by Monica Harmsen.

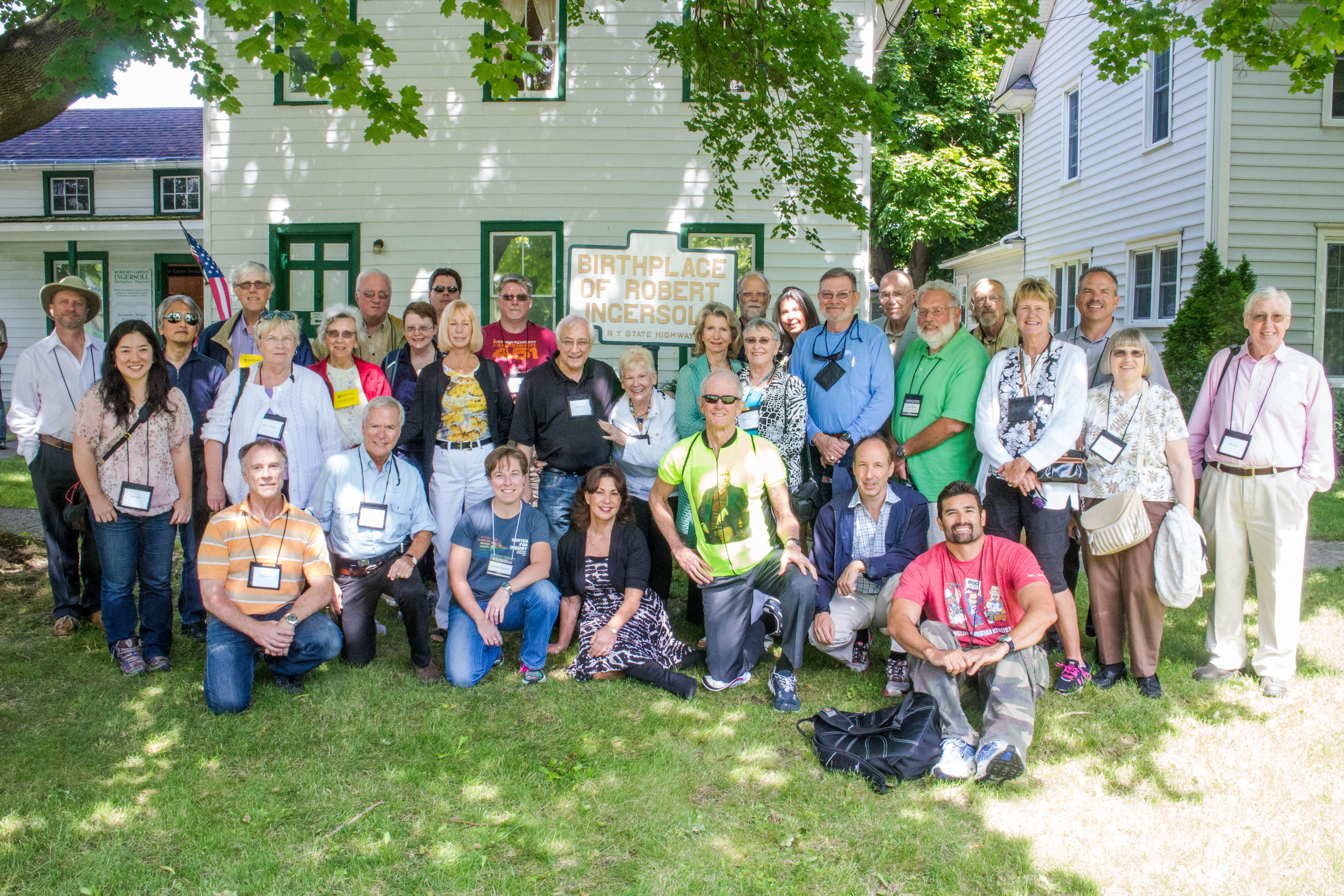
Participants in the “Robert Green Ingersoll and the Reform Imperative” conference and tour pose before the Robert Green Ingersoll Birthplace Museum in Dresden, New York, on August 17, 2014. Photo by Monica Harmsen.

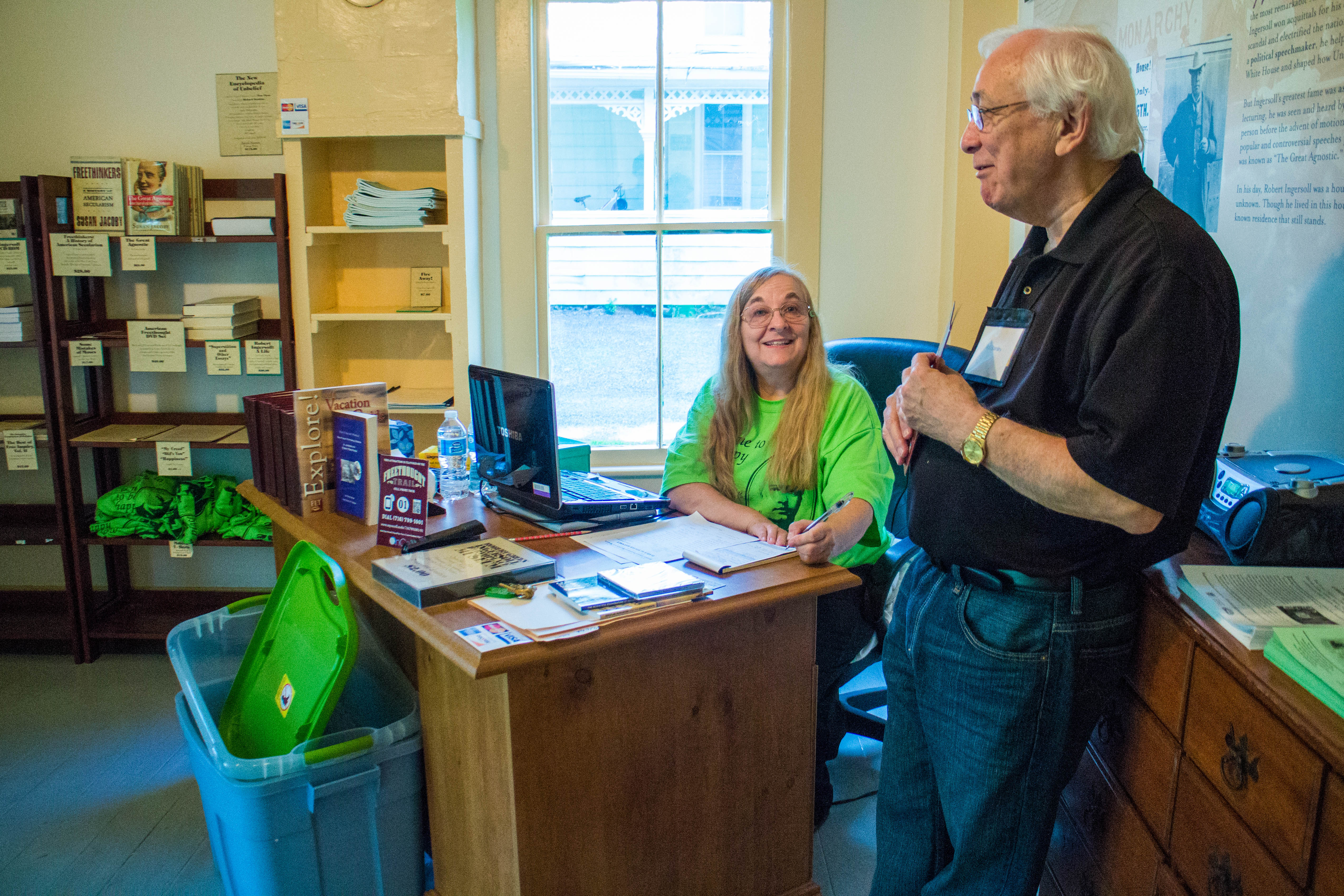
Ingersoll Museum docent Frances Emerson welcomes one of 55 Ingersoll Conference participants who visited the Birthplace Museum during the “Robert Green Ingersoll and the Reform Imperative” conference motor coach tour, August 17, 2104. Photo by Monica Harmsen.

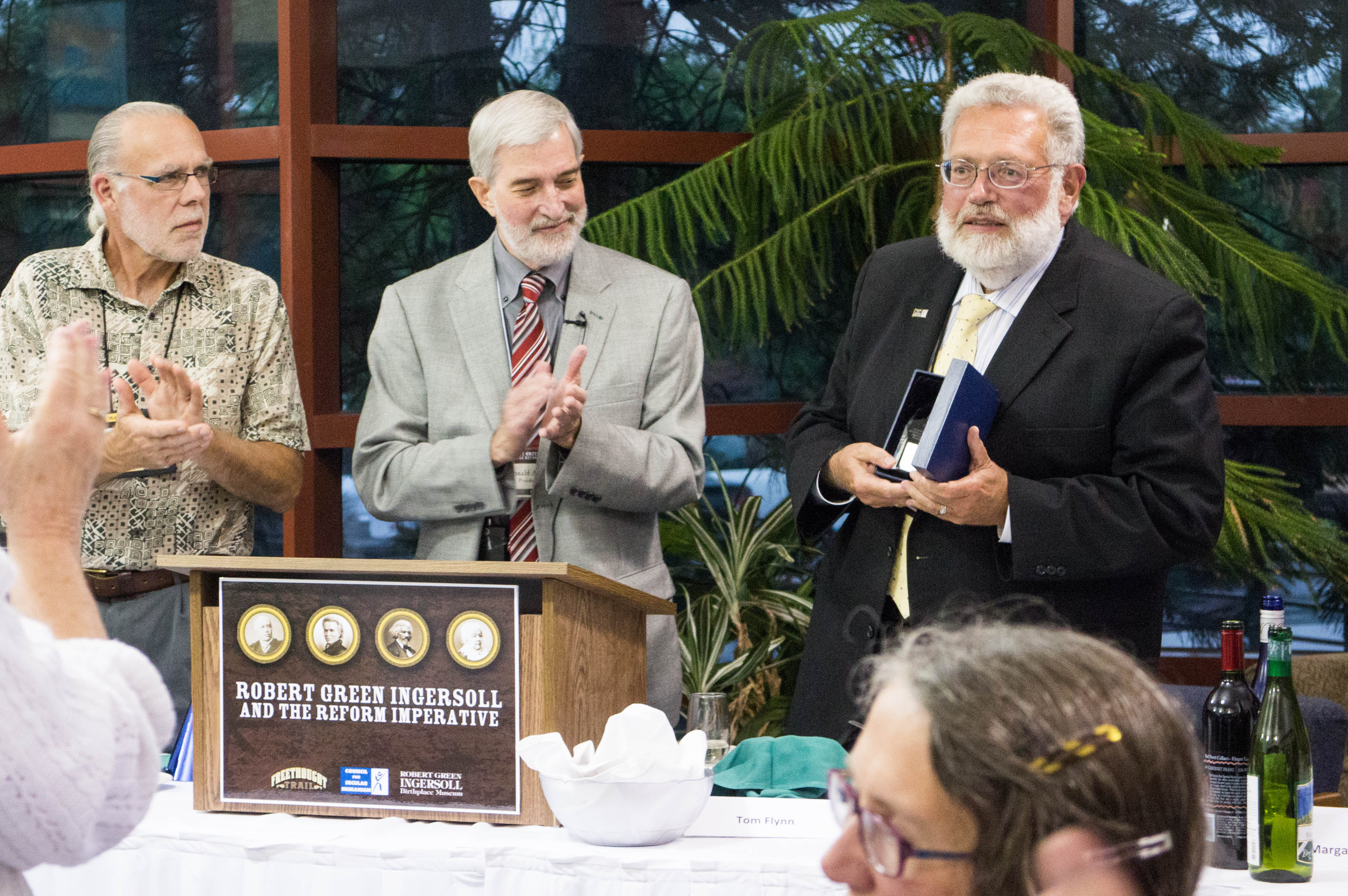
Robert Ingersoll Memorial Committee chair Jeff Ingersoll and Council for Secular Humanism CEO Ronald A. Lindsay applaud Museum director Tom Flynn, who was presented with an award for his work on the Museum. Photo by Monica Harmsen.
