= Free inquiry =

Free inquiry may refer to:

- Free inquiry, a concept related to intellectual freedom and sometimes to freethought
- Free Inquiry, a bi-monthly journal of secular humanist opinion and commentary published by the Council for Secular Humanism
