= Tom Flynn (author) =

American writer (1955–2021)

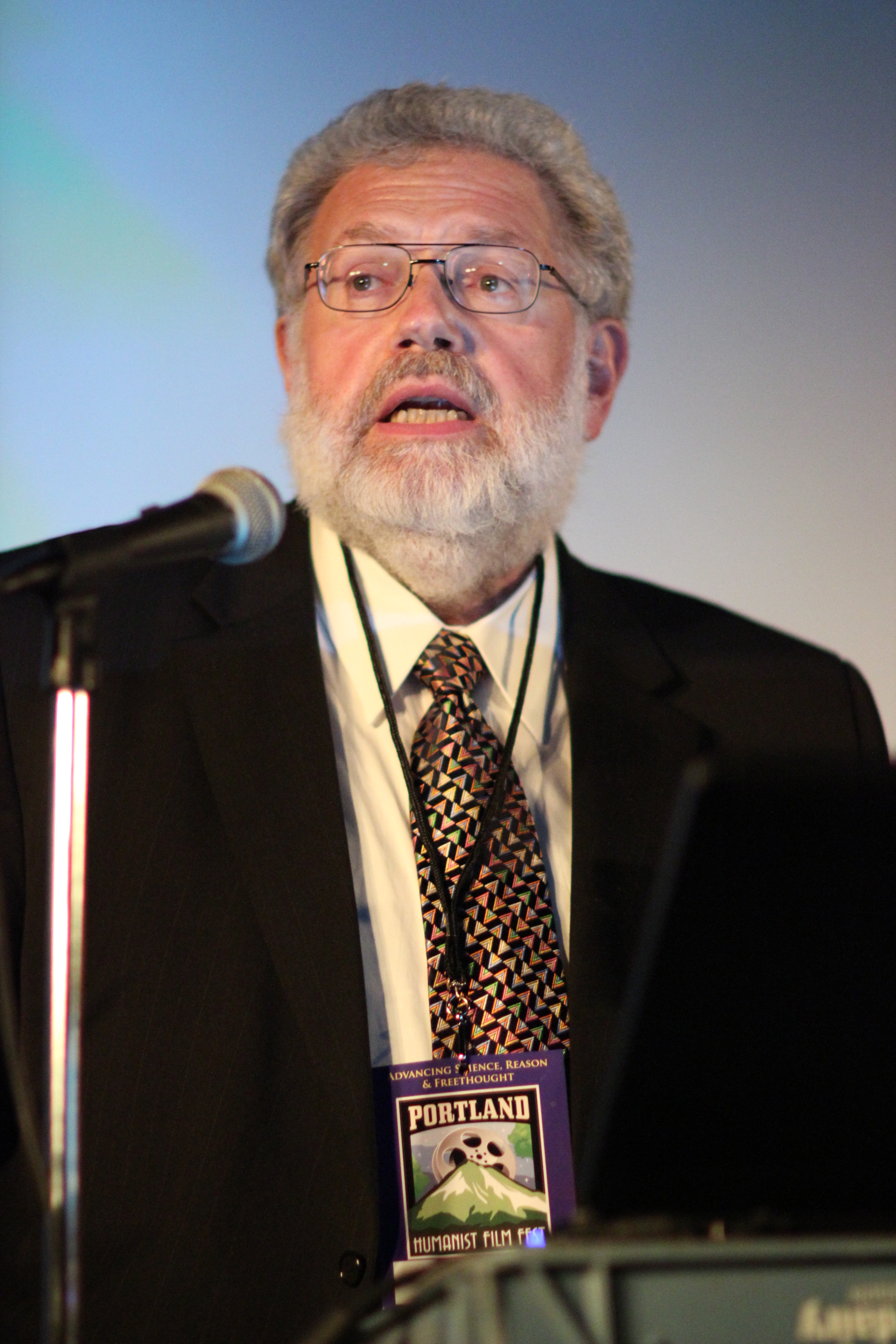
- Speaking at the 2011 Humanist Film Festival
- Born: Thomas W. Flynn; August 18, 1955; Erie, Pennsylvania, U.S.
- Died: August 23, 2021 (aged 66)
- Education: Xavier University
- Occupations: Director of the Robert Green Ingersoll Birthplace Museum; Executive Director of the Council for Secular Humanism; Editor of Free Inquiry magazine.
- Notable work: The Trouble With Christmas; The New Encyclopedia of Unbelief
- Tom Flynn's voice recorded October 2016 at CSICon
- Website: CFI profile

Thomas W. Flynn (August 18, 1955 – August 23, 2021) was an American author, journalist, novelist, executive director of the Council for Secular Humanism, and editor of its journal Free Inquiry. He was also director of the Robert Green Ingersoll Birthplace Museum and the Freethought Trail.

Much of Flynn's work addressed church-state issues, including his 1993 book The Trouble with Christmas, in connection with which he made hundreds of radio and TV appearances in his role as the curmudgeonly "anti-Claus", calling attention to what he viewed as unfair treatment of the nonreligious during the year-end holiday season. He edited The New Encyclopedia of Unbelief, a comprehensive reference work on the history, beliefs, and thinking of men and women who live without religion. He contributed a new Introduction to A History of the Warfare of Science with Theology in Christendom by Andrew Dickson White and blogged on The Washington Post's On Faith site during 2010 and 2011. He blogged regularly on the Center for Inquiry's blog Free Thinking. He was also the author of several anti-religious, black comedy, science fiction novels.

== Early life ==
In an autobiographical chapter in Flynn's 1993 The Trouble with Christmas, Flynn stated that he was born in 1955 in Erie, Pennsylvania, the only child of a moderately conservative Catholic family. He believed zealously in the teachings of the pre-Vatican II Roman Catholic Church, beginning to question its teachings only after many church doctrines and practices were revised in the wake of the Second Vatican Council, which affected parish life when Flynn was a young adolescent. He earned his bachelor's degree at Xavier University, the Jesuit university in Cincinnati, Ohio, where the school's emphasis on philosophy and theology gave him the tools he needed to pursue his religious questions at a more serious level. Over several years of inquiry he rejected his Catholicism, then his Christianity, and ultimately his theism. Acknowledging that he had become an atheist in 1980 while residing in Milwaukee, Wisconsin, he visited Milwaukee's downtown library, looked up "atheism" in the card catalogue, and found the so-called Dresden Edition of The Works of Robert G. Ingersoll on the open stacks. Reading Ingersoll's florid Gilded Age speeches in defense of agnosticism and atheism confirmed him in his identity as an atheist and kindled his desire to become a public activist for unbelief.

== Secular humanism ==
While working as a corporate and industrial filmmaker and later as an advertising account executive, he began to do volunteer work for the Council for Democratic and Secular Humanism (CODESH), publisher of Free Inquiry, which was based in Buffalo, New York, where he resided after 1981. In 1984, he resolved to stop celebrating Christmas, saying it was no longer "the birthday of anyone I knew." In 1989 Flynn joined the staff of CODESH, later an affiliate of the Center for Inquiry. In 2000 he became the editor of Free Inquiry. In 2009 he was named executive director of the Council for Secular Humanism, as the former CODESH had been known since 1996.

== Popular culture ==
In a 2006 Point of Inquiry podcast, while discussing an increase of the nonreligious in the United States with host DJ Grothe, Flynn stated, "Over a period from the late 1980s to the dawn of the 21st century, a number of polls using a number of different methodologies had continued to show a steady rise, an approximate doubling in the number of people who did not claim traditional religious affiliation." Later in the podcast he added "What we seem to be witnessing pretty clearly is a growing polarization of society. The fundamentalist religious right has been growing very widely. Apparently, the secularist left, if we can call it that, has been growing pretty strongly too, and most of this growth has been at the expense of the center."

== The Trouble With Christmas ==
In this book Flynn summarized the history of the holiday from an atheist perspective, arguing that the Santa Claus myth is harmful for child development, and urged atheists, secular humanists, and other nonreligious Americans to push back, at the same time making themselves more visible during the Christian holiday season, by refusing to celebrate all aspects of the holiday, religious or secular. The book received ongoing media attention; in 1994, Flynn was the only on-screen expert in A&E Network's first Biography segment on Santa Claus who was not a Greek Orthodox priest. He was billed onscreen as a folklorist. His critique was still controversial in 2007, when editor Dale McGowan published a point-counterpoint debate on the Santa Claus myth in his handbook for nonreligious parents, Parenting Beyond Belief: on Raising Ethical, Caring Kids Without Religion. Flynn argued that early immersion in the Santa myth predisposed children to accept absurd religious teachings in later life; McGowan argued that the discovery that the Santa myth was untrue prepared children to reject religious dogmas in later life. Both agreed that the subject demanded further research by the child-development community.

Speaking to Point of Inquiry host Robert M. Price about the putative "War on Christmas," Flynn states that retailers have found "there is a lot more religious diversity... [they discovered] a lot of people with money to spend that aren't Christians." Therefore, retailers changed from greeting customers with "Merry Christmas" to "Happy Holidays," to the disapproval of conservatives. He added that as "the Christian dominance of the culture continues to decline, there's going to be a little more emphasis or openness to the idea that some people are doing other things on December 25".

Flynn told D.J. Grothe on Point of Inquiry that he does not hate Christmas. He stopped celebrating the holiday in 1984 and has found that it is very difficult to escape from. "What struck me... was how arrogant society was with promoting this holiday. There is a lot of pressure... put on people who do not feel this is 'their holiday', we shove it down everybody's throats." Flynn's goal is to raise consciousness and persuade the "Christian majority to live and let live". Currently, most Christians "strongly demand that everyone pay lip-service to their sectarian birthday holiday."

The book's beginnings came from an installment of a column in the Secular Humanist Bulletin in 1992. The essay attracted national media attention including more than a score of local and national radio reports during the 1992 holiday season. It was as a consequence of this publicity that Prometheus Books offered Flynn a contract for the book.

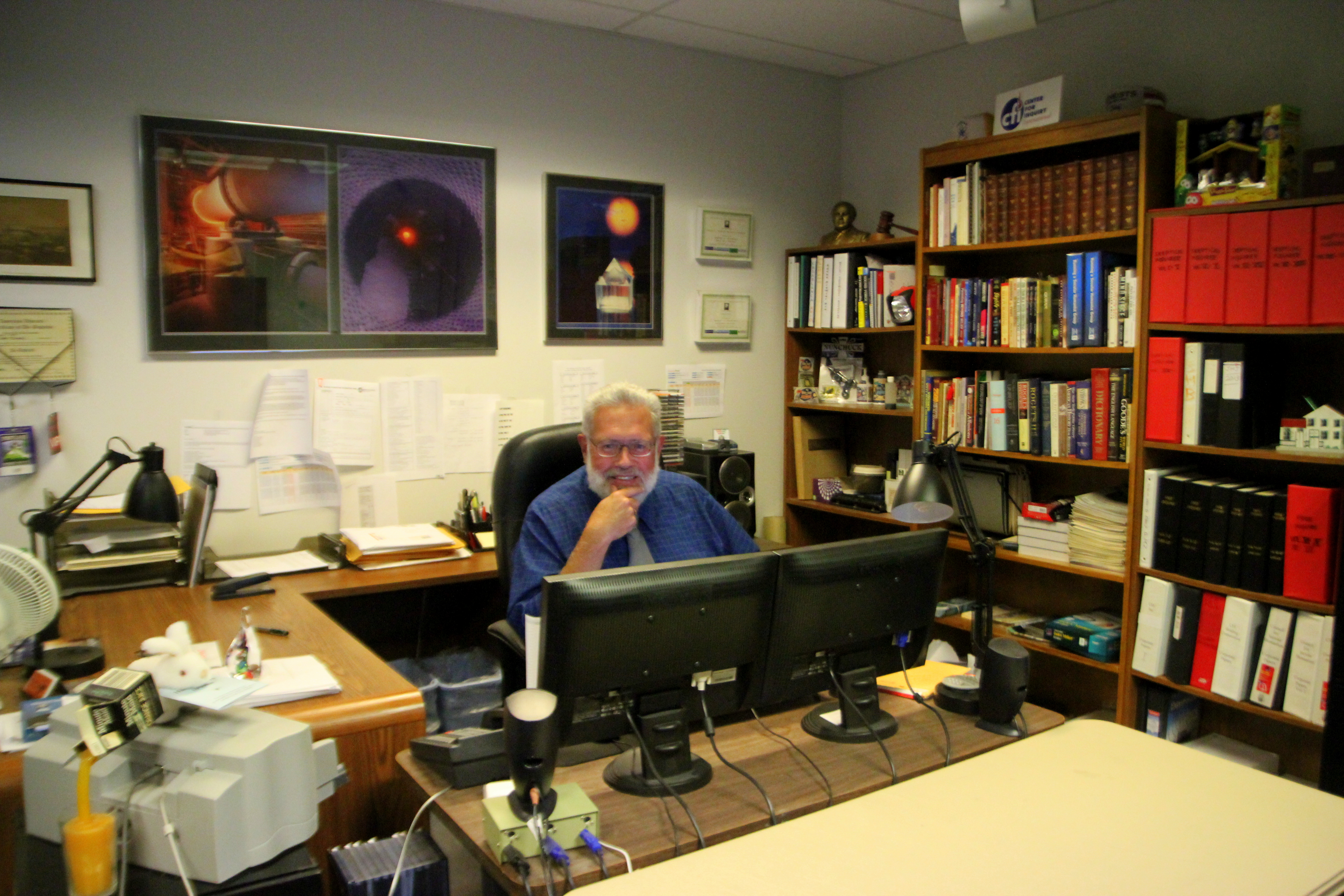
Tom Flynn in office 2013

== Science fiction novels ==
Flynn was the author of two published satirical science fiction novels whose themes include the media and religion.

Galactic Rapture, published in 2000 by Prometheus Books, concerns the rise of a consciously fraudulent false messiah on Jaremi Four, a ruined, quarantined world. Undercover documentarians from the galactic empire to which Earth belongs (human cameras known as Spectators) present the false messiah's story to eager audiences on many worlds. Earth religions have become a particular fascination for the galactic public, and the idea spreads that he is the next incarnation of Jesus Christ. (It is now accepted by Christians that God sends his son to one world after another.) Defying the ruined planet's quarantine, a corrupt mining magnate, a bumbling Mormon televangelist, and conspiring Catholic cardinals doing the bidding of the Pope jockey to establish influence on Jaremi Four and claim a piece of the alleged next Christ for themselves. Science fiction author John Grant reviewed the print book. Galactic Rapture was briefly re-released as three shorter books by See Sharp Press in 2012/13. Nothing Sacred (Prometheus Books, 2004) is a sequel to Galactic Rapture set ten years after the conclusion of that novel. It features the Mormon comic villain from the first novel; Gram Enoda, a young Earthman on the make who has accidentally acquired a hugely powerful, self-aware digital assistant, and a darkly charismatic televangelist whose theology is drawn from 19th century German and Russian nihilism who wind up interfering in a top-secret government plan to quite literally save the Galaxy. It was reviewed by Towing Jehovah author James Morrow in Free Inquiry.

In October 2018, Galactic Rapture was re-released by Double Dragon Publishing with the title Messiah Games; Nothing Sacred was re-released without title change; followed by a third brand new novel released in December 2018 titled Behold, He Said. This series of novels is collectively referred to as the Messiah Trilogy.

== The New Encyclopedia of Unbelief ==
In 2007 Prometheus Books published The New Encyclopedia of Unbelief, an 897-page reference work on atheism, agnosticism, humanism, and related philosophies edited by Flynn. The work featured a foreword by Richard Dawkins. Intended as a successor to the 1985 The Encyclopedia of Unbelief edited by freethought bibliographer Gordon Stein, the work earned mixed reviews. The International Review of Biblical Studies praised it, saying, "This is a most valuable addition to all existing encyclopedias of religion because it offers the calmly argued perspective of contemporary freethinkers, atheists and secular humanists". Atheist blogger Santi Tafarella criticized the work's choice of topics and its pre-Internet approach to its subject matter, but still finds the book useful.

== Documentary ==
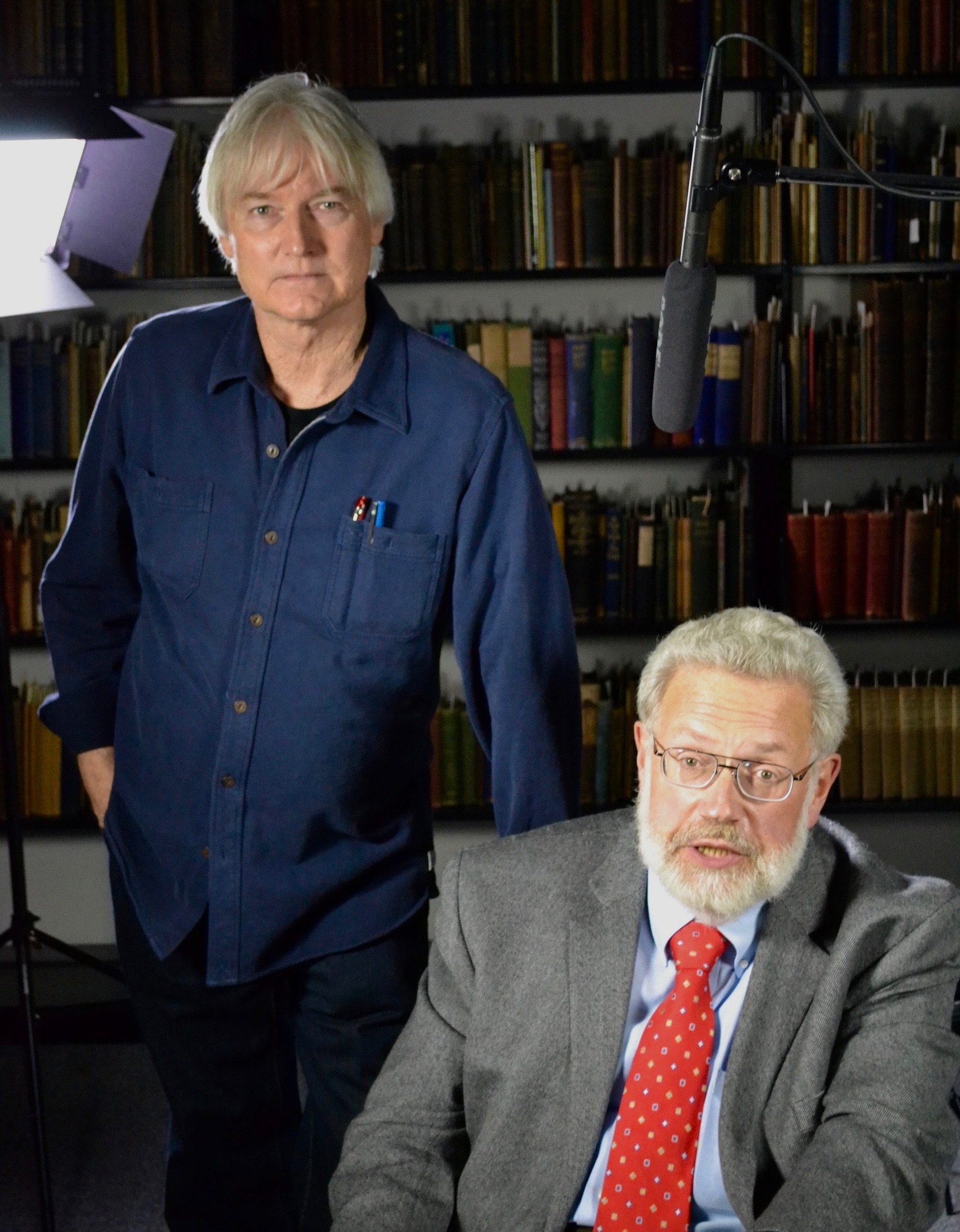
Roderick Bradford and Tom Flynn during the 2013 production of American Freethought in the Rare Book Room at the Center for Inquiry Library, Amherst, New York.

Flynn is executive producer for American Freethought, a TV documentary series on the history of secularism and censorship in the United States. American Freethought was written, produced and directed by Roderick Bradford.

== Robert Green Ingersoll ==
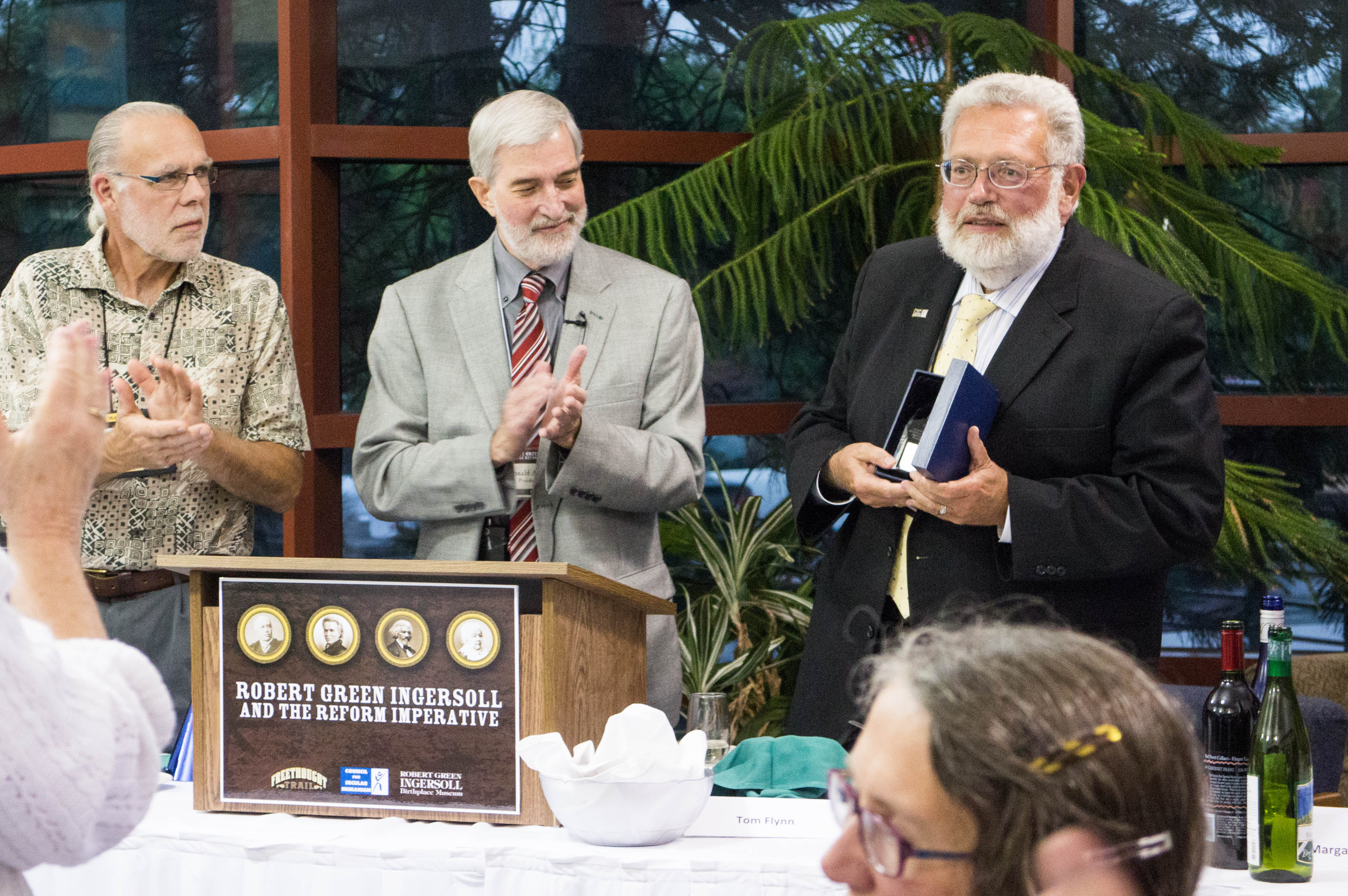
Jeff Ingersoll and Ronald A. Lindsay applaud Flynn when presented with an award for his work on the Robert Ingersoll Birthplace Museum.

Flynn designed the freethought museum at the birthplace of 19th century agnostic orator Robert G. Ingersoll in Dresden, New York, and has been its director since it opened to the public in 1993.

In 1986 the birthplace, a two-story frame house in the small village of Dresden (pop. 300), was badly deteriorated. CODESH Inc., as the Council for Secular Humanism was then known, purchased the property for $7,000 and pressed successfully for its inclusion on the National Register of Historic Places. Some $250,000 was then raised from grant-makers and the public; between 1987 and 1991 the house was stabilized and rehabilitated. Though Flynn was employed at CODESH during this period he was not closely involved with the purchase and rehabilitation, which were orchestrated primarily by chairman Paul Kurtz, then-Free Inquiry editor Tim Madigan, and colleague Richard Seymour. In 1992 it was decided to establish a museum at the birthplace, and Flynn was chosen to develop the museum. Flynn tells D.J. Grothe on Point of Inquiry "He [Ingersoll] literally was seen or heard by more Americans than would see or hear any other human being until the advent of motion pictures or radio."

The Robert Ingersoll Birthplace Museum opened on Memorial Day weekend in 1993. The Museum has been open to the public on weekends each summer and fall ever since. Conspicuous developments have included, in 2001, installation of a large bust of Ingersoll that decorated a Dowagiac, Michigan theater razed in 1968. In 2003, a historically accurate front porch was added by volunteer contractor (and Ingersoll descendant) Jeff Ingersoll. In that year the Museum also adopted its current tagline, referring to Ingersoll as "the most remarkable American most people never heard of," a reference to his near-exclusion from history by religious detractors. In 2004 a lost grand march titled Ingersolia, composed by prolific Gilded Age composer George Schleiffarth (died 1921), was rediscovered and its score displayed at the Museum. In 2005 two interpretive Web sites made their debut: a virtual tour of the Ingersoll Museum and a celebration of freethought and radical reform history within a rough 100-mile radius of the Ingersoll Museum, the Freethought Trail. In 2008 the large commemorative plaque marking the location of Ingersoll's New York City residence, removed from the Gramercy Park Hotel when that property was rehabilitated as a boutique hotel, was installed in the Museum. In 2009, the current high-definition widescreen orientation video was installed, featuring the Ingersolia March unearthed in 2004. In 2009, the museum received a large number of artifacts and papers from the estate of Eva Ingersoll Wakefield, Robert Ingersoll's, last surviving granddaughter. Selected items were displayed beginning in 2010.

== Principal contentions ==
The secularist movement should emulate the strategies employed successfully by LGBT activists in recent decades, especially publicizing its numbers and encouraging nonbelievers to "out" themselves.

Secular humanists should stress that they are explicitly nonspiritual and should avoid using the word "spirit" and its cognates whenever possible.

Since long-term social trends are causing nonreligious institutions, public and private, to displace religious organizations as providers of social and community services, there is no reason for humanist and atheist organizations to launch sectarian charitable initiatives of their own patterned on those conducted by churches. Instead, nonbelievers who take secularization seriously should welcome the gradual disappearance of providers who discriminate according to worldview from the ranks of service providers.

The rapid acceptance of same-sex marriage is in one sense regrettable as it has co-opted the powerful LGBT movement to become a supporter of traditional matrimony. Before the emergence of same-sex marriage as an attainable reform goal, LGBT activism seemed more likely to compel the creation of a wholly secular civil union system that would have provided an alternative to traditional matrimony and would probably have seriously undercut it; in the long term this is a more desirable goal than simply expanding traditional marriage to include same-sex couples.

Overpopulation remains an existential threat to human welfare, and has been so since the late 1950s. Human numbers have become so excessive that over several generations they will need to be reduced several-fold in order to achieve long-term sustainability for the human community. It remains to be seen whether the environment has already been so degraded that long-term human survival will be possible at all.

Flynn also has written for Free Inquiry arguing that euthanasia in the form of mercy killing is acceptable. In the article, Flynn cast doubt on the usefulness of the doctrine of double effect which is used to justify a distinction between passive and active euthanasia.

== Death ==
Flynn died on August 23, 2021, aged 66.

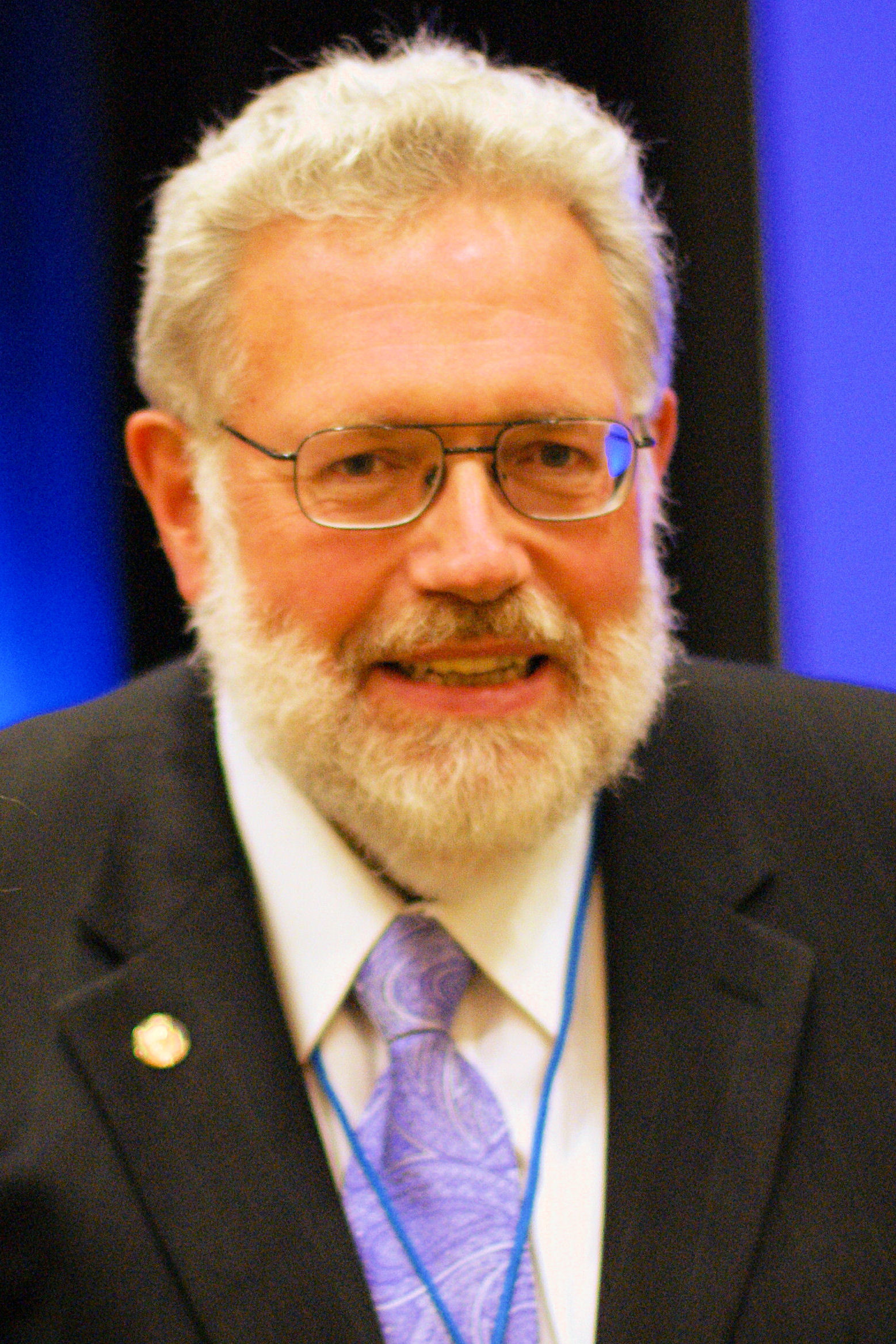
Tom Flynn photographed at CSICON, New Orleans October 2011

== Bibliography (books) ==
- The Trouble with Christmas. Buffalo, N.Y.: Prometheus Books, 1993. ISBN 978-0-87975-848-6
- The New Encyclopedia of Unbelief. Amherst, NY: Prometheus Books, 2007. ISBN 978-1-59102-537-5 (with a foreword by Richard Dawkins)
- Galactic Rapture. Amherst, N.Y.: Prometheus Books, 2000. ISBN 978-1-57392-754-3
- Nothing Sacred: A Novel. Amherst, N.Y.: Prometheus Books, 2004 ISBN 978-1-59102-127-8
- The Messiah Game: A Comedy of Terrors-Part I [Paperback] See Sharp Press 978-1937276041
