= Christopher Willis House =

Historic house in New York, United States

- U.S. National Register of Historic Places
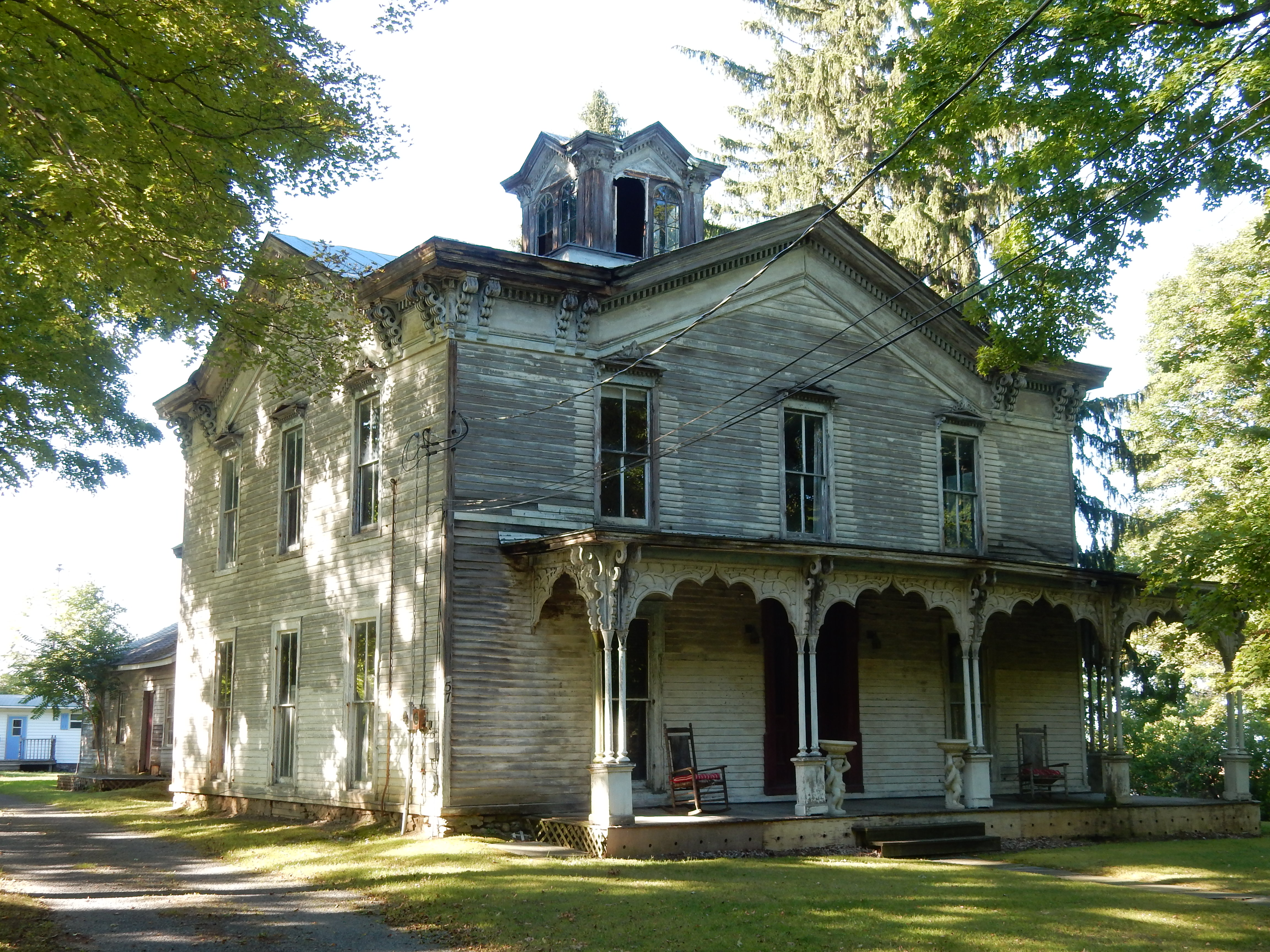
- Christopher Willis House. September 2015.

- Location within New York Location within the United States
- Location: 57 Seneca St., Dresden, New York
- Coordinates: 42°41′5″N 76°57′3″W
- Area: less than one acre
- Built: 1830
- Architectural style: Greek Revival, Italianate
- MPS: Yates County MPS
- NRHP reference No.: 94000967
- Added to NRHP: August 24, 1994

Christopher Willis House is a historic home located at Dresden in Yates County, New York. It is a Greek Revival/Italianate style structure built about 1830.

It was listed on the National Register of Historic Places in 1994.
