= Dresden, Yates County, New York =

Dresden, New York
- Village
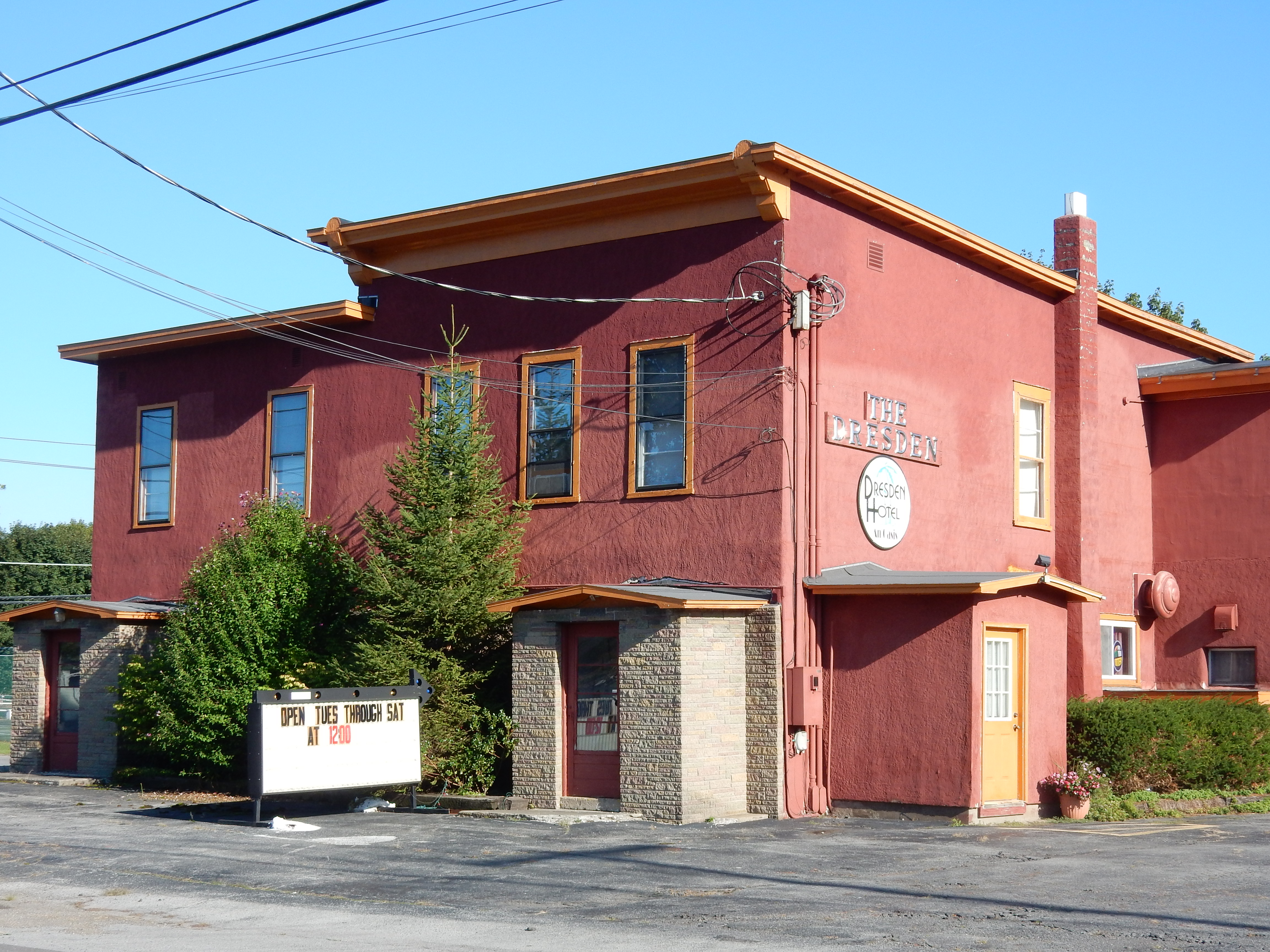
- The Dresden Hotel at the entrance to the village.

- Location in Yates County and the state of New York.
- Coordinates: 42°41′2″N 76°57′26″W
- Country: United States
- State: New York
- County: Yates
- Settled: 1811
- Incorporated: July 16, 1867
- Named after: Dresden, Germany

Area
  - Total: 0.31 sq mi (0.80 km^{2})
  - Land: 0.30 sq mi (0.78 km^{2})
  - Water: 0.0039 sq mi (0.01 km^{2})
- Elevation: 509 ft (155 m)

Population (2020)
  - Total: 293
  - Density: 970.9/sq mi (374.88/km^{2})
- Time zone: UTC-5 (Eastern (EST))
  - Summer (DST): UTC-4 (EDT)
- ZIP code: 14441
- Area code: 315
- FIPS code: 36-20896
- GNIS feature ID: 0948642
- Website: http://dresdenny.ourlocalview.com//HomeTown/

Dresden is a village in Yates County, New York, United States. The population was 308 at the 2010 census. The village was named after Dresden in Germany.

The Village of Dresden is located in the Town of Torrey and is twelve miles south of Geneva. Dresden is located in the Finger Lakes Region of New York.

== History ==
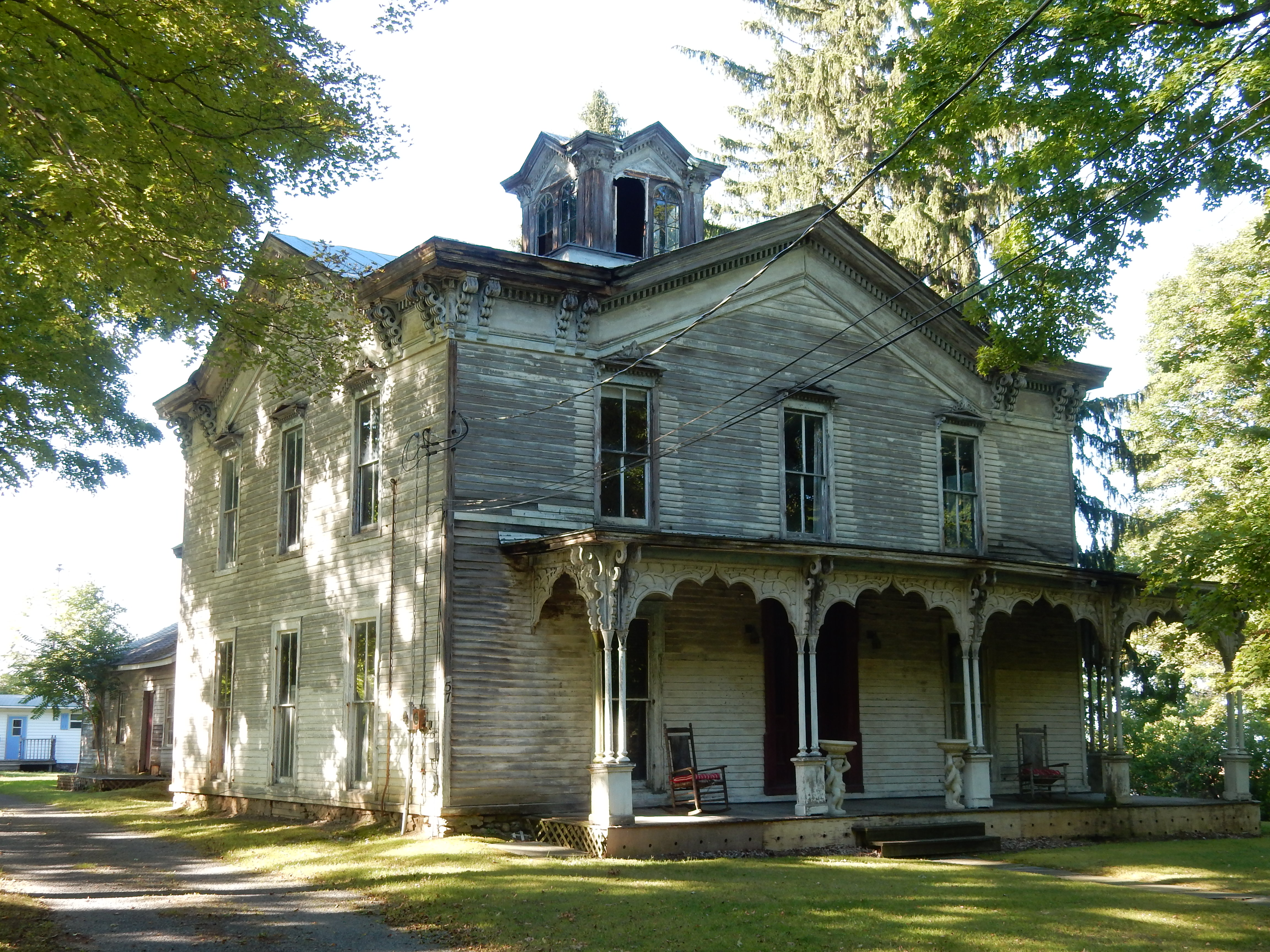
Historic Christopher Willis House on Seneca St. in Dresden.

The region was known as "Kashong" (or "Kashanquash") to the natives and was part of the Phelps and Gorham Purchase.

At the end of the 18th century, followers of the Public Universal Friend, a religious leader, began to settle in the area. They called the area "Jerusalem" and founded a community near the present site of Dresden.

Dresden was founded in 1811 as a planned community. The Village of Dresden was incorporated in 1867.

Dresden was the eastern terminus for the former Crooked Lake Canal, which operated from 1833 to 1877. This canal linked the area through other lake canals to the Erie Canal.

The Robert Ingersoll Birthplace and Christopher Willis House are listed on the National Register of Historic Places.

== Notable people ==
- Frederick Condit, Wisconsin legislator
- Robert G. Ingersoll, political leader and orator, born in Dresden

== Geography ==
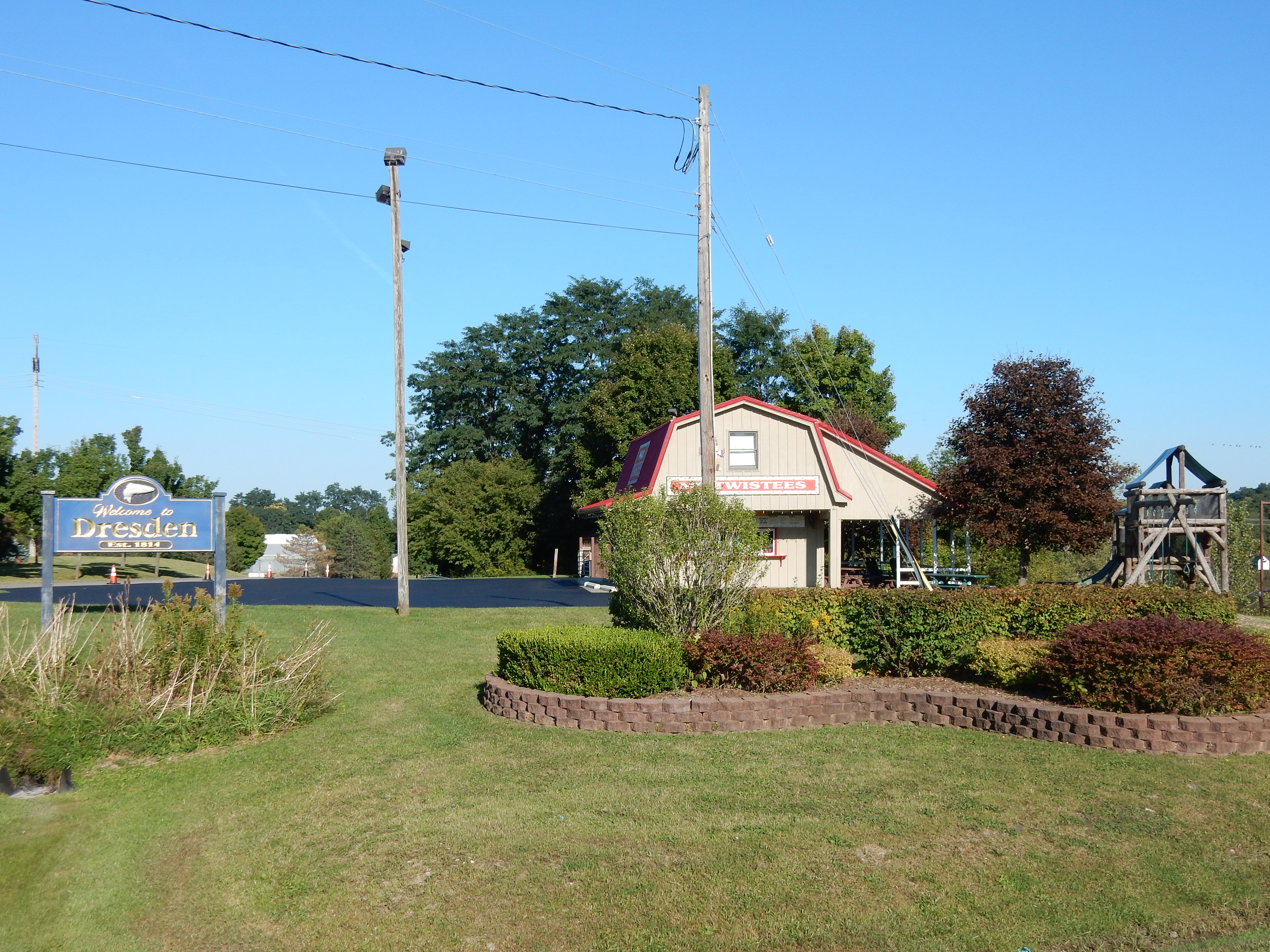
View from New York State Route 14.

Dresden is located at 42°41′2″N 76°57′26″W (42.683857, -76.957296).

According to the United States Census Bureau, the village has a total area of 0.3 square miles (0.78 km^{2}), all land.

The village on the west shore of Seneca Lake. Keuka Lake Outlet (known early as "Crooked Lake Outlet"), a stream connecting Keuka Lake with Seneca Lake, flows past the south side of the village. At first the significant water drop made it an important location for mills. Later it was developed as a canal between the lakes.

New York State Route 14 intersects New York State Route 54 at Dresden.

== Demographics ==
Historical population
Census	Pop.	Note	%±
1880	366		—
1890	348		−4.9%
1900	306		−12.1%
1910	345		12.7%
1920	295		−14.5%
1930	276		−6.4%
1940	257		−6.9%
1950	373		45.1%
1960	437		17.2%
1970	450		3.0%
1980	378		−16.0%
1990	339		−10.3%
2000	307		−9.4%
2010	308		0.3%
2020	293		−4.9%
U.S. Decennial Census

As of the census of 2000, there were 307 people, 116 households, and 78 families residing in the village. The population density was 1,005.1 inhabitants per square mile (388.1/km^{2}). There were 139 housing units at an average density of 455.1 per square mile (175.7/km^{2}). The racial makeup of the village was 94.14% White, 0.33% Native American, 0.33% Asian, 5.21% from other races. Hispanic or Latino of any race were 9.77% of the population.

There were 116 households, out of which 28.4% had children under the age of 18 living with them, 56.0% were married couples living together, 5.2% had a female householder with no husband present, and 31.9% were non-families. 23.3% of all households were made up of individuals, and 12.1% had someone living alone who was 65 years of age or older. The average household size was 2.58 and the average family size was 2.92.

In the village, the population was spread out, with 21.5% under the age of 18, 8.5% from 18 to 24, 22.8% from 25 to 44, 30.9% from 45 to 64, and 16.3% who were 65 years of age or older. The median age was 43 years. For every 100 females, there were 106.0 males. For every 100 females age 18 and over, there were 99.2 males.

The median income for a household in the village was $42,500, and the median income for a family was $40,208. Males had a median income of $31,875 versus $24,375 for females. The per capita income for the village was $18,207. About 4.8% of families and 5.7% of the population were below the poverty line, including 13.0% of those under the age of eighteen and none of those 65 or over.

== Additional information about Dresden ==
- The local history museum is the Robert Ingersoll Birthplace.
- The Outlet Trail is used for hiking and kayaking, following the former canal and ruins of mills.
- Many wineries are within a short distance of the village.
- A natural gas energy plant owned by Greenidge Generation generates electrical power and performs crypto currency mining (58%) and takes water for cooling from the lake.There is also a constant hum coming from the plant.
- The NUWC Seneca Lake Sonar Test Facility is located in Dresden and operates an offshore platform in the middle of the lake.

== Gallery ==
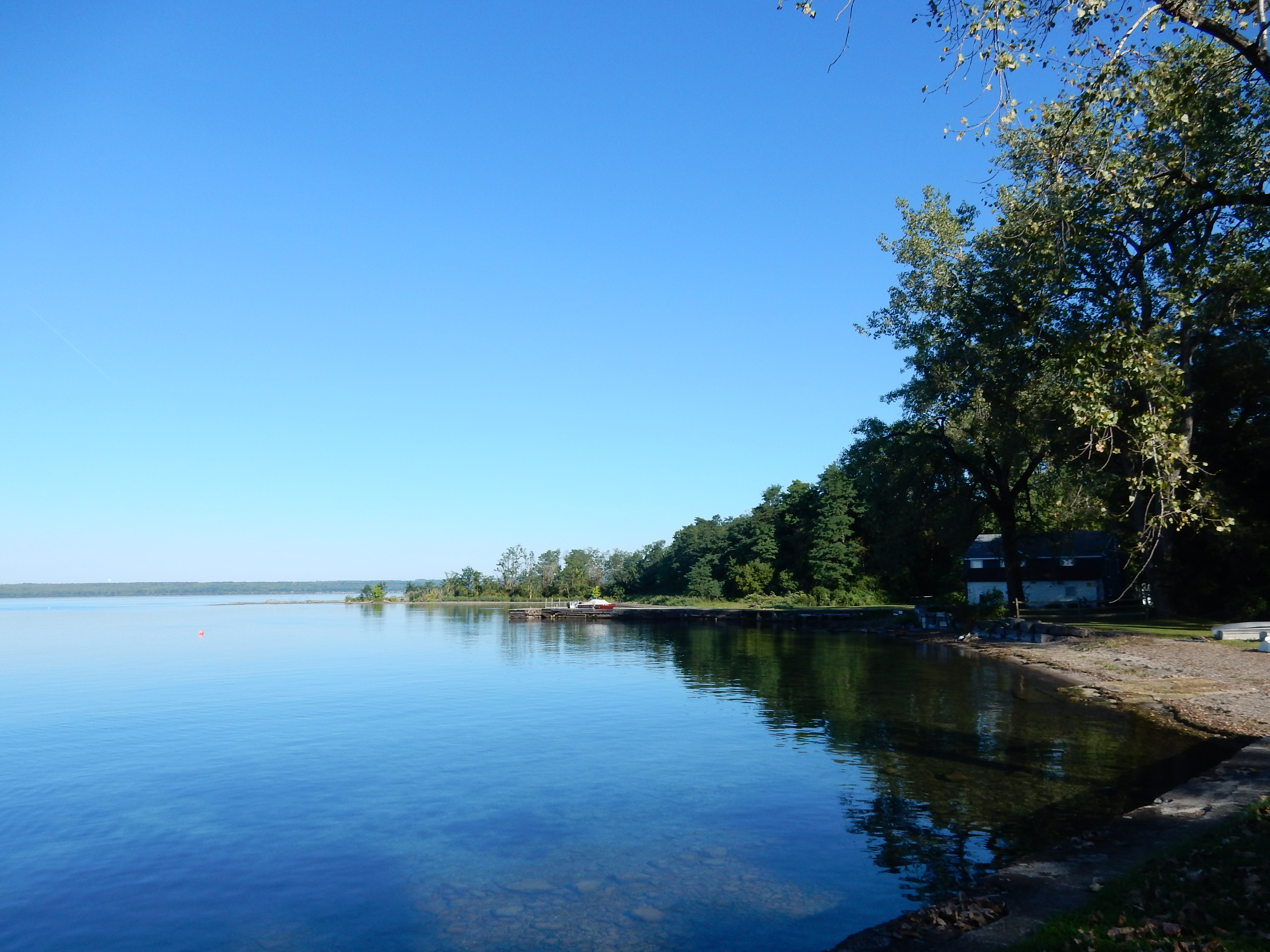
Seneca Lake in Dresden.

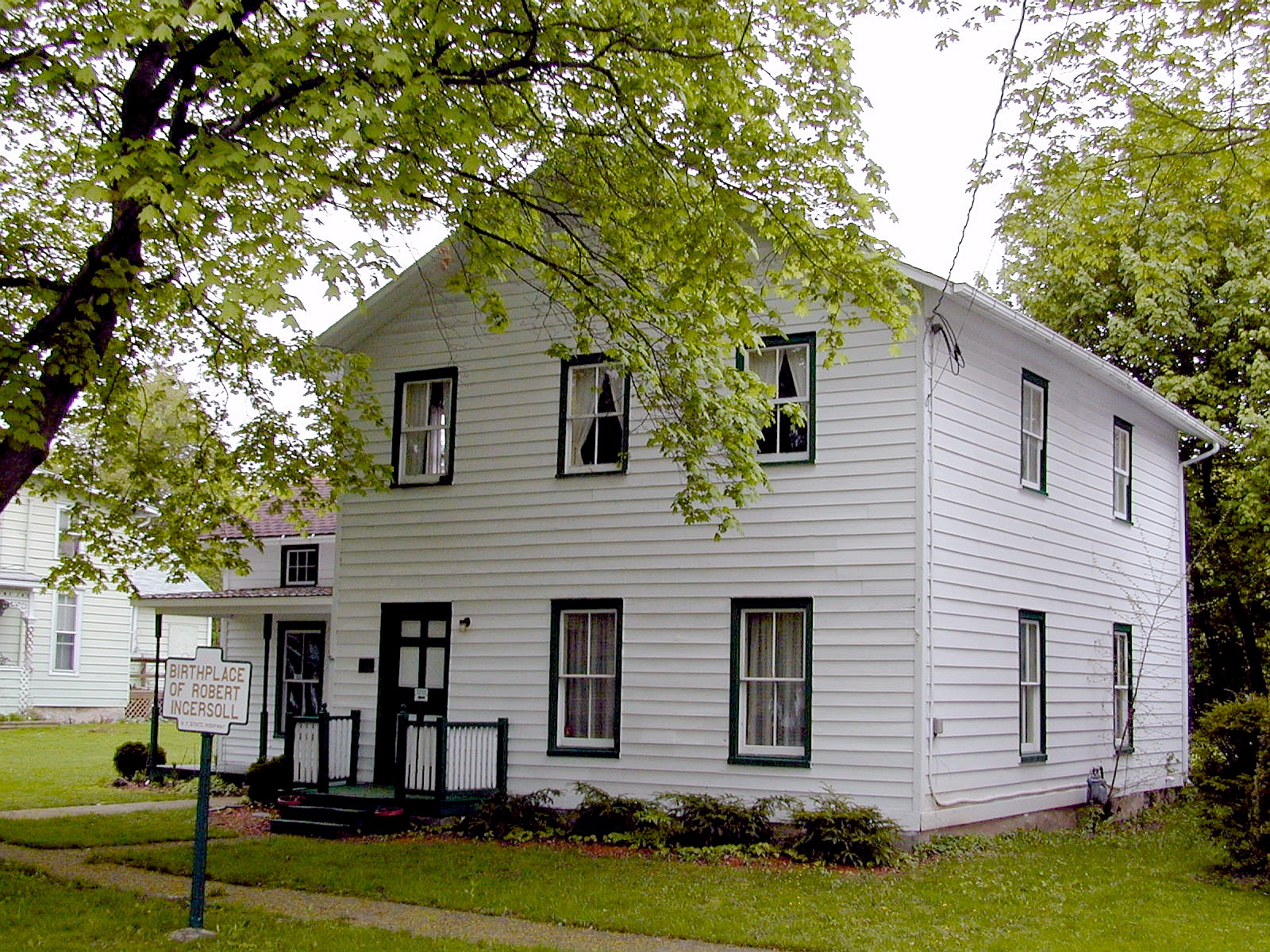
Robert Green Ingersoll Birthplace Museum.

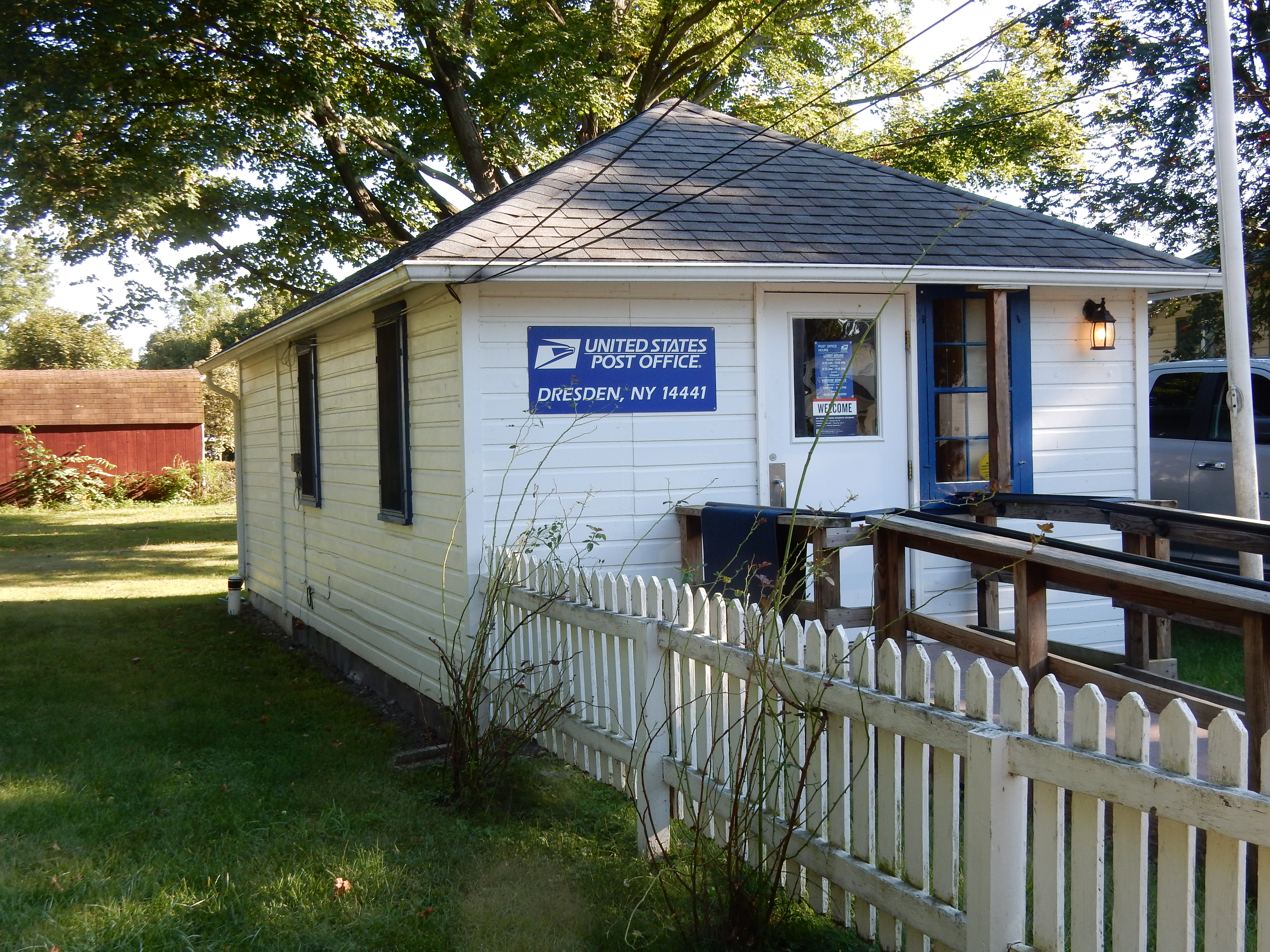
Dresden Post Office.

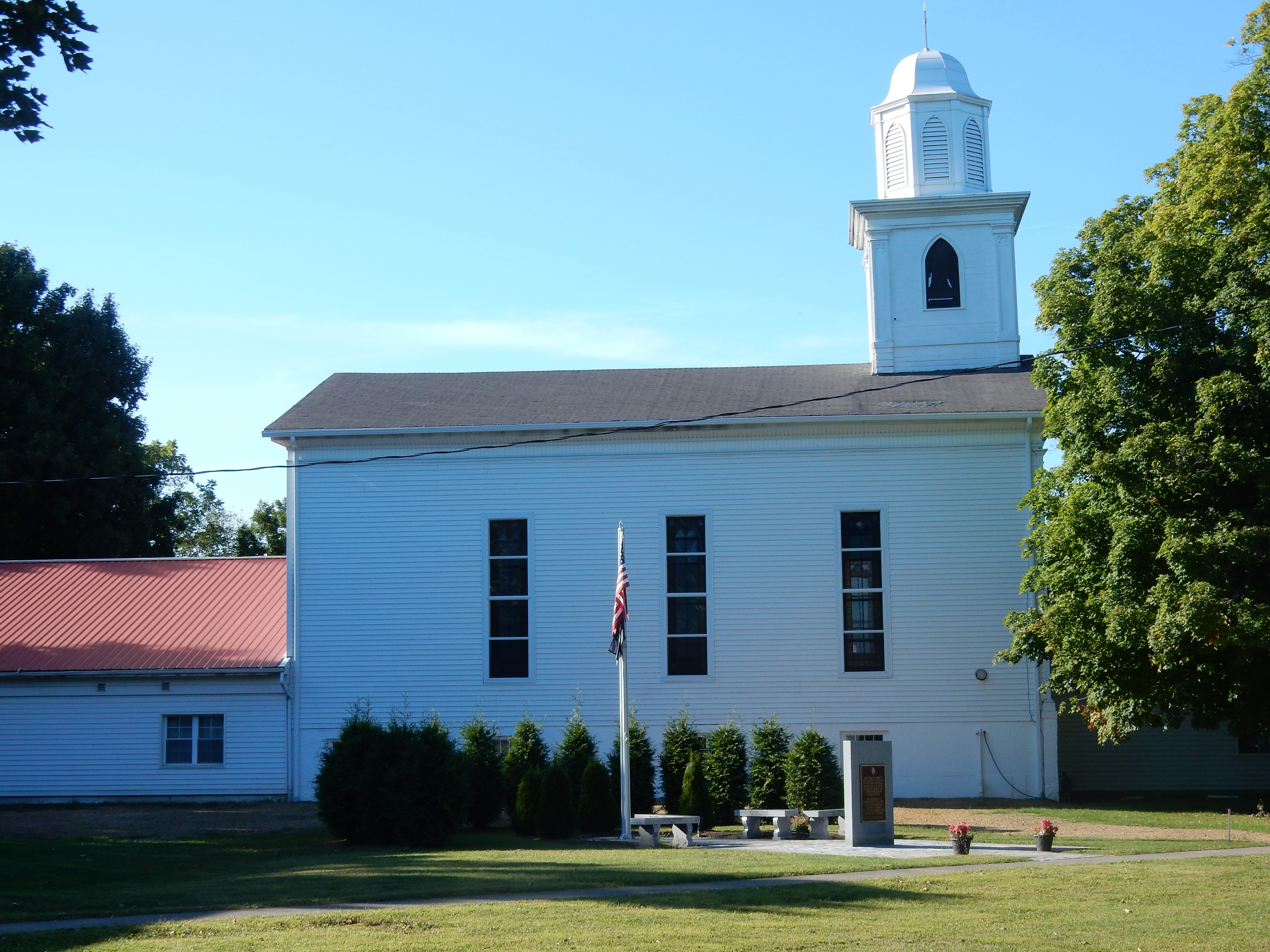
Dresden United Methodist Church.
