= Point of Inquiry =

Science, news, and religion podcast

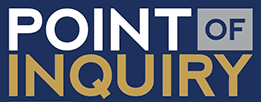
- Genre: Science; news; religion

Cast and voices
- Hosted by: James Underdown

Publication
- Original release: 2005
- Updates: Weekly

Reception
- Ratings: Non-explicit

Point of Inquiry is the radio show and flagship podcast of the Center for Inquiry (CFI), "a think tank promoting science, reason, and secular values in public policy and at the grass roots". Started in 2005, Point of Inquiry has consistently been ranked among the best science podcasts available in iTunes. It has been celebrated for its guests and for the quality of its interviews. Former guests include leading scientists, writers and public intellectuals such as Neil DeGrasse Tyson, Paul Krugman, Lisa Randall, Brian Greene, Oliver Sacks, Susan Jacoby, David Brin and Temple Grandin.

== Format ==
Point of Inquiry is recorded at the Center for Inquiry headquarters in Amherst, New York. iTunes features over 200 free episodes of Point of Inquiry, averaging 30 to 35 minutes in length, with each consisting of a long form interview with a high-profile guest from the worlds of scientific skepticism, science, academia, and philosophy. The show focuses on traditional topics in scientific skepticism, such as psychic investigations, alternative medicine, alleged extraterrestrial visitations, ghosts, and cryptozoology. It also covers current events and public policy. The inaugural episode in December 2005 featured an interview with CFI founder Paul Kurtz, who spoke about the incompatibility of science and religion.

In July 2012, Point of Inquiry produced their first video episode featuring Michael De Dora, Ed Brayton, Jessica Ahlquist, and Jamie Kilstein.

Previously, Chris Mooney hosted half of the shows with the balance split between the other hosts.

In October 2013, CFI announced the "new team who will take Point of Inquiry into its next exciting phase", Lindsay Beyerstein, Josh Zepps and producer Joshua Billingsley.

On June 2, 2017, Point of Inquiry released its first episode with new host Paul Fidalgo. New hosts Kavin Senapathy and James Underdown were announced on October 15, 2018. The show is produced by CFI digital marketing strategist, Michael Powell.

== Staff ==
Host	Tenure	Information
D. J. Grothe	December 2005 to March 2010	American author and public speaker
Robert M. Price	March 2010 to November 2011	Former host of CFI podcast The Human Bible
Karen Stollznow	March 2010 to December 2011	Australian writer, linguist and skeptic
Chris Mooney	March 2010 to September 2013	U.S. journalist and academic
Indre Viskontas	February 2012 to August 2013	Neuroscientist and opera singer
Lindsay Beyerstein	November 2013 to April 2017	Investigative journalist
Josh Zepps	November 2013 to April 2017	Journalist
Paul Fidalgo	May 2017 to May 2018 March 2022 to January 2024	CFI Communications Director
Kavin Senapathy	January 2019 – October 2019	Author, Journalist, Activist
James Underdown	October 2018 – Present	Executive Director of CFI-West
Leighann Lord	April 2020 – March 2021	Comedian, writer, actor

Producer	Tenure
Thomas Donnelly	2005 to 2009
Adam Isaak	2010 to 2013
Joshua Billingsley	2013 to 2014
Nora Hurley	2014 to 2017
Mike Powell	2017 to present

== Popular Science Idol ==
Point of inquiry co-sponsored the "Popular Science Idol" contest along with the National Science Foundation Office of Legislative and Public Affairs, Discover Magazine, and Popular Science as a science spoof of the reality television series American Idol. The event was hosted as a workshop to discover the next great science communicator. The event was hosted by Chris Mooney and Indre Viskontas served as one of the expert judges. The first event was won by Tom Di Loberto for a 3-minute presentation on the difficulties involved in predicting the weather.

== Select episodes ==
Guest	Topic	Air Date
Steven Pinker	The Decline in Violence	February 18, 2013
Paul Krugman	Science and Pseudoscience in Economics	January 28, 2013
David Brin	Uplifting Existence	December 17, 2012
Oliver Sacks	Hallucinations	November 5, 2012
Lisa Randall	Knocking on Heaven's Door	October 8, 2012
Temple Grandin	The Science of Livestock Animal Welfare	August 27, 2012
Cara Santa Maria	Talk Nerdy to Us	June 11, 2012
Lawrence M. Krauss	A Universe from Nothing	February 6, 2012
Brian Greene	The Fabric of the Cosmos	January 2, 2012
Daniel Dennett	The Scientific Study of Religion	December 12, 2011
Austin Dacey	Rock the Theocrats	September 26, 2011
Neil deGrasse Tyson	Communicating Science	February 28, 2011
John Shook	The God Debates	October 15, 2010
S. Jay Olshansky	Can Science Extend Human Life?	September 10, 2010
Adam Savage	Skeptic	July 9, 2010
S.T. Joshi	Fright and Free thought	May 28, 2010
Scott Lilienfeld	Real Self-Help	March 19, 2010
Andrew Revkin	The Death of Science Writing, and the Future of Catastrophe	March 12, 2010
Chris Hedges	I Don't Believe in Atheists	May 2, 2008
Lawrence M. Krauss	Seducing for Science	December 28, 2007
Paul Kurtz	Ethics for the Nonreligious	December 21, 2007
Richard Dawkins	Science and the New Atheism	December 7, 2007
Neil deGrasse Tyson	Communicating Science to the Public	November 16, 2007
Michael Behe	The Edge of Evolution	November 9, 2007
Steven Pinker	The Stuff of Thought	October 26, 2007
Alan Dershowitz	Blasphemy	October 5, 2007
Francis Collins	The Language of God	August 31, 2007
Carol Tavris	Mistakes Were Made	August 3, 2007
Ophelia Benson	Why Truth Matters	July 20, 2007
Philip Kitcher	Living with Darwin	July 13, 2007
Christopher Hitchens	God Is Not Great	July 6, 2007
Natalie Angier	The Canon	June 29, 2007
Tom Clark	Encountering Naturalism	June 22, 2007
Matthew C. Nisbet	Selling Science to the Public	April 20, 2007
Steven Pinker	Evolutionary Psychology and Human Nature	February 23, 2007
Barbara Forrest	The Wedge of Intelligent Design	February 16, 2007
Peter Singer	The Way We Eat	February 9, 2007
Neil deGrasse Tyson	Death by Black Hole	January 25, 2007
Ann Druyan	Carl Sagan and The Varieties of Scientific Experience	January 5, 2007
Susan Blackmore	In Search of the Light	December 15, 2006
Richard Dawkins	The God Delusion	October 16, 2006
Sam Harris	Letter to a Christian Nation	October 6, 2006
Ann Druyan	Science, Wonder, and Spirituality	September 15, 2006
Neil deGrasse Tyson	The Sky Is Not the Limit	August 17, 2006
Thomas Kida	Don't Believe Everything You Think	July 14, 2006
James Randi	Science, Magic, and Future of Skepticism	June 30, 2006
Tom Flynn	The Rise of the Non-Religious	June 23, 2006
Eugenie Scott	Evolution vs. Religious Belief?	April 28, 2006
Sam Harris	The Mortal Dangers of Religion	April 14, 2006
Sam Harris	The End of Faith	April 7, 2006
Jamy Ian Swiss	Psychics, Science, and Magic	March 24, 2006
Daniel Dennett	Breaking the Spell	March 3, 2006
Richard Dawkins	The Root of All Evil?	February 10, 2006
Eugenie Scott	The Dover Trial: Evolution vs. Intelligent Design	January 20, 2006
Max Maven	Magic and Skepticism	January 13, 2006

A full episode list is available on iTunes.

== Recognition ==
In May 2012, Point of Inquiry was named one of the "Top 10 Podcasts to Feed Your Brain" by Business Insider.

Featured podcast suggestion by the Telegraph February 9, 2013.

=== Awards ===
Award	Year	Category	Result	Ref.
Academy of Podcasters	2015	Spirituality & Religion	Finalist	
