= Free Inquiry =

Bi-monthly journal

- Vol. 35 issue 5 cover.
- Editor: Paul Fidalgo
- Categories: Secularism
- Frequency: Bimonthly
- Circulation: 17306 (2013) (U.S. and International)
- Publisher: Council for Secular Humanism
- Founded: 1980
- Country: United States
- Based in: Amherst, New York
- Language: English
- Website: www.secularhumanism.org
- ISSN: 0272-0701

Free Inquiry is a bimonthly journal of secular humanist opinion and commentary published by the Council for Secular Humanism, a program of the Center for Inquiry. Philosopher Paul Kurtz was the editor-in-chief from its inception in 1980 until stepping down in 2010. Kurtz was succeeded by Tom Flynn who worked as Editor in Chief until 2021. Paul Fidalgo was named editor in 2022, beginning with the October/November issue. Feature articles cover a wide range of topics from a freethinking perspective. Common themes are separation of church and state, science and religion, dissemination of freethought, and applied philosophy. Regular contributors include well-known scholars in the fields of science and philosophy.

== Controversy ==
In Free Inquiry's April–May 2006 issue, the magazine published four of the cartoons that had originally appeared in the Danish newspaper Jyllands-Posten and that had sparked violent worldwide Muslim protests. Kurtz, editor-in-chief of Free Inquiry said, "What is at stake is the precious right of freedom of expression". The Borders refused to carry this issue in their main and Waldenbooks stores because of the cartoons. The reason given by Borders for their decision was not sensitivity to religion but fear of violence.

The story made national and international news and the implications of this self-censorship were widely discussed, including by CBS News, The Washington Post, and The New York Times. The "blogosphere" widely condemned the decision of Borders to ban the magazine and columnist Christopher Hitchens lamented the action in an article.

== Columnists ==
Regular columnists include:

- Ophelia Benson – Author and blogger
- Russell Blackford – Author and philosopher
- Greta Christina – Author and blogger
- Shadia Drury – Professor of Philosophy and Political Science
- Tibor Machan – Professor of Philosophy
- Mark Rubinstein – Economist
- Faisal Saeed Al Mutar – Commentator and social critic

== Editorial Board ==
- Editor in Chief: Paul Kurtz (until May 2010)
- Editor: Paul Fidalgo
- Managing Editor: Nicole Scott
- Assistant Editor: Julia Lavarnway
- Senior Editors: Bill Cooke, Richard Dawkins, Ed Doerr (deceased), James Haught, Jim Herrick, Ronald A. Lindsay, Taslima Nasrin
Editors

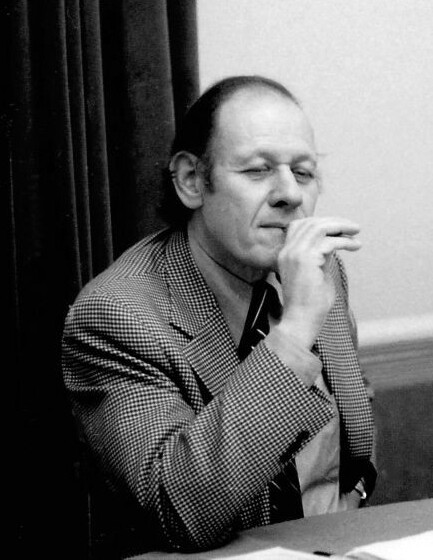
Paul Kurtz - 1980 to 2010

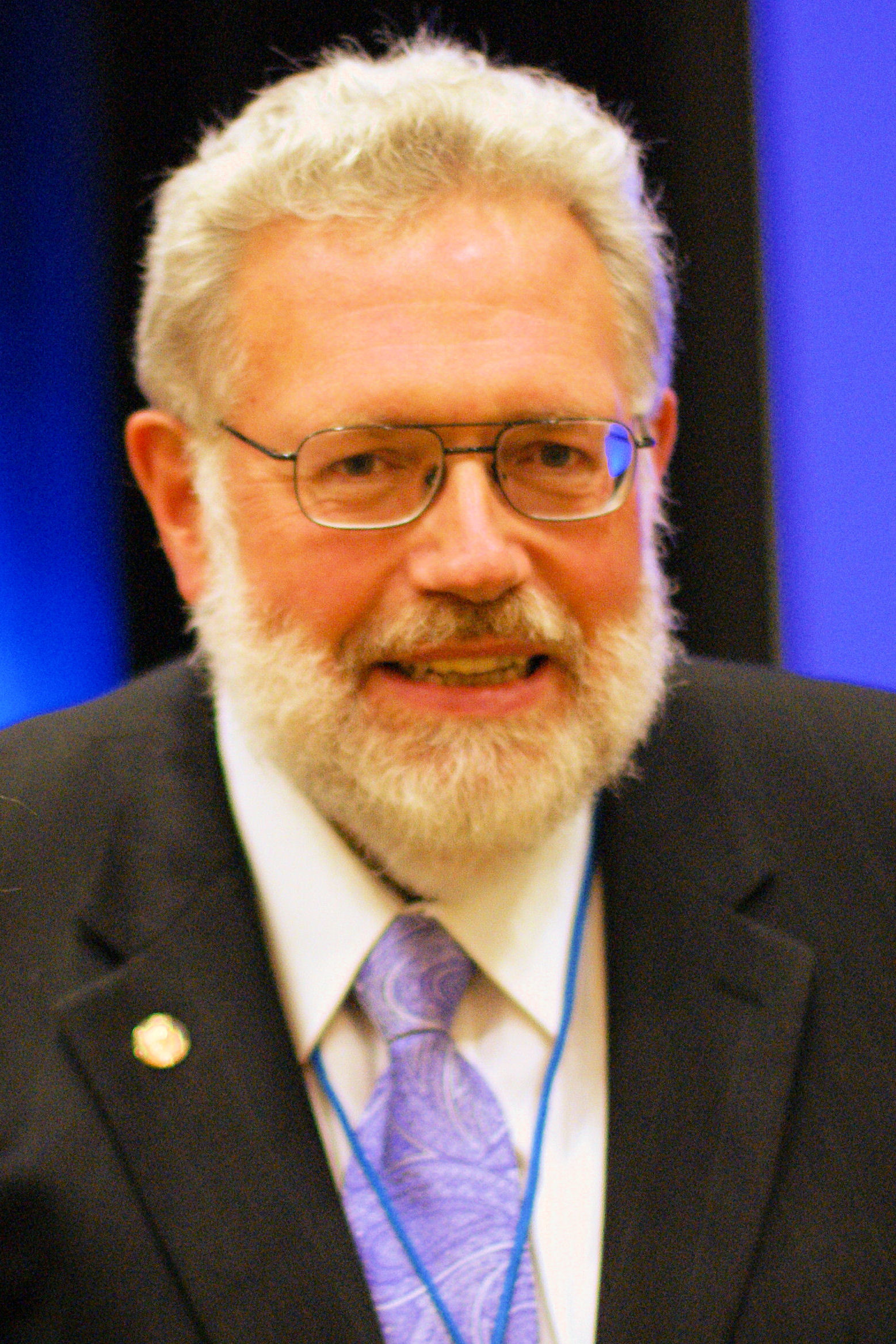
Tom Flynn - 2011 to 2021

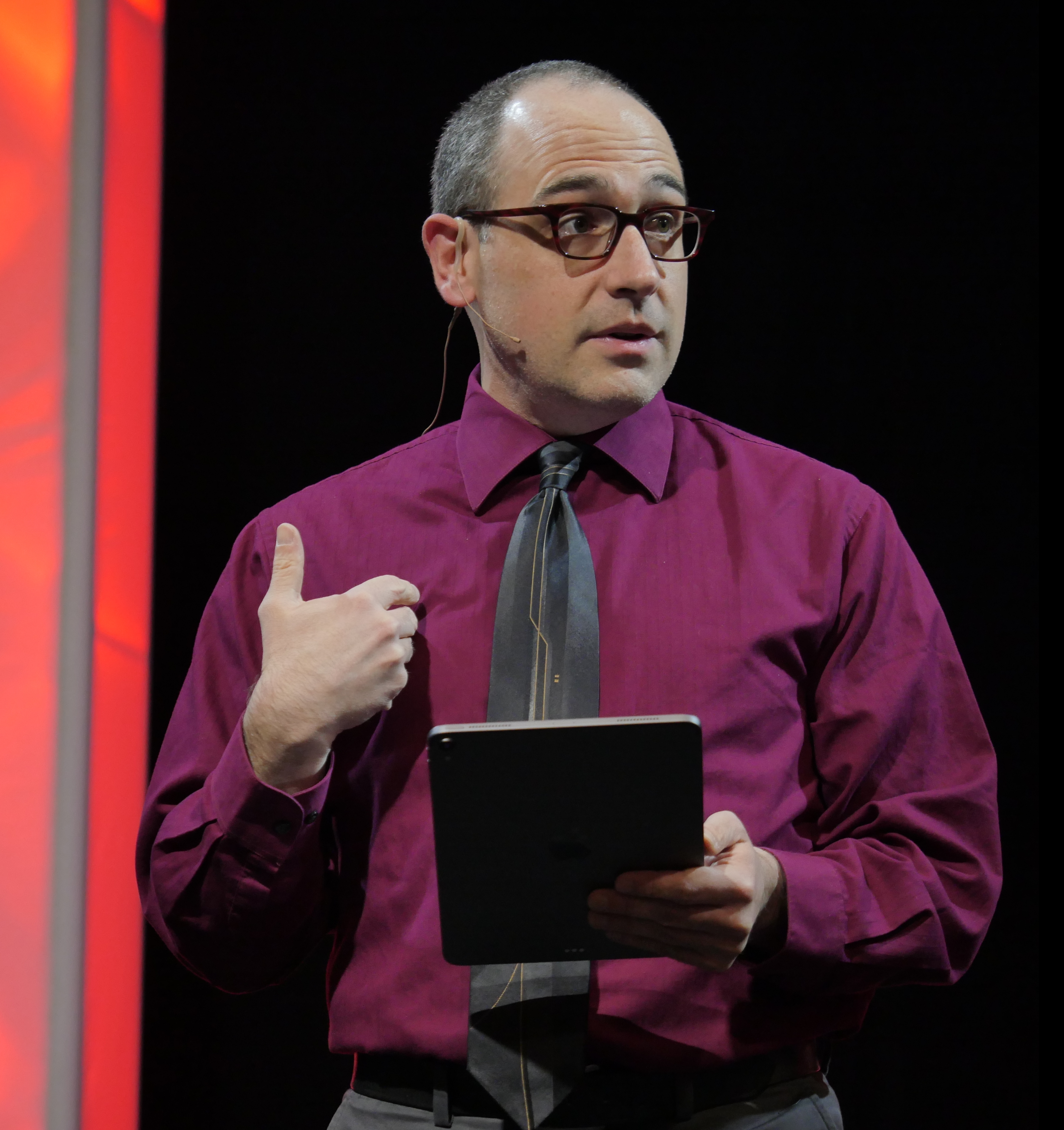
Paul Fidalgo - 2022 to 2024
