= West Tennessee Raids =

Forrest's Expedition into West Tennessee was a raid conducted by Confederate Brigadier General Nathan Bedford Forrest in Tennessee from December 1862 to January 1863, during the American Civil War. Forrest led an expedition of 1,800 to 2,500 men into Union-held West Tennessee to disrupt the supply lines of Major General Ulysses S. Grant, who was campaigning south along the Mississippi River toward Vicksburg.

The Confederate objective was to dismantle segments of the Mobile and Ohio Railroad between Columbus, Kentucky and Jackson, Tennessee in an attempt to slow Grant's advance. In meeting this objective the raid was largely successful, and Forrest returned with more men and supplies than he had started with. Ultimately, however, Grant's army was only marginally delayed, and Vicksburg fell to Union forces six months later. The West Tennessee raid consisted of three main actions at Lexington, Jackson and Parker's Cross Roads.

== Expedition begins ==
Forrest and his command, 1,800 men and four cannon, left Columbia, Tennessee on December 10 or 11, 1862, under orders from General Braxton Bragg. They were headed into West Tennessee, facing an area of well-entrenched enemies with ten times their strength in armaments. In writing to his superiors, Forrest made clear the ineffective condition of his arms as well as the fact that his men were supplied with only 10 rounds of caps for their shotguns while many of their flintlock muskets lacked flints. The reply was a curtly couched order to march without delay. Forrest was irritated at being ordered to go into the area without "ferriage."

The expedition reached the Tennessee River at Clifton below Double Island on December 13. The precise route Forrest took is not known, but there was a Columbia–Clifton Thoroughfare in existence during the era with a length of approximately 69 miles (111 km). Forrest's men spent hours looking to cross the rain-swollen Tennessee River. On December 14, Forrest found a leaky flatboat hidden in the brush. He made this into a pontoon to begin an effective passage across the river; by December 15, his command had successfully forded the river. The artillery and wagon trains used this bridge but the horses, mules and men swam across the river in a cold pelting rain without tents or other shelter. On the 15th, the troops marched 8 miles (13 km) toward Lexington in Henderson County, Tennessee.

On December 16, the expedition continued toward Lexington, making an additional 18 miles (29 km) before Forrest broke for camp to allow rest, dry clothing and prepare for the upcoming campaign. Upon inspection it was found that the greater part of the small supply of ammunition caps had become wet and unserviceable. However, Forrest had sent agents in behind the enemy lines, which paid off when a citizen returned to the Confederate encampment with 50,000 shotgun and pistol caps.

== Battle of Lexington ==
Forrest's unit encountered a Federal force eight miles from Lexington on December 17. Forrest sent Colonel James W. Starnes to engage and remove this obstacle and immediately led the remainder of his command by a road at a gallop to cut off the enemy retreat. He gave the lead to four Alabama companies from his old regiment under the command of Captain Frank B. Gurley. As soon as the artillery crossed a bridge about six miles from Lexington, General Forrest pushed on to where the enemy was found forming a strong position on an elevated ridge. Positioning George Gibbs Dibrell's 8th and Jacob B. Biffle's 19th Tennessee regiments as well as Gurley's Battalion and his own escort, Forrest attacked the left of the Union line and broke it, then turned and struck it on the flank again, scattering Colonel Isaac R. Hawkins' Tennessee Federals and leaving the 11th Illinois Cavalry Regiment and artillery to the brunt of the attack.

Capt. Gurley, with at most 200 men, captured 150 officers and men, including Colonel Robert G. Ingersoll and Major Lucien H. Kerr, along with 300 small arms, mostly Sharps carbines, ammunition, 200 horses and wagons. Also captured was the Union artillery, consisting of two fully equipped 3-inch Ordnance rifles. These were used by General Forrest until the close of the war. Starnes captured an additional fifty federals as well as numerous weapons as the fleeing federals left them upon the road. The federals did slow the Confederates down a little, but Union positions near Beech Creek were quickly overrun. Without further resistance, the Confederates continued toward the town of Jackson, arriving on the afternoon of December 18. Ingersoll himself seemed to enjoy his captivity until paroled three days later.

== Battle of Jackson ==
The citizens of Jackson, supportive of the Confederate cause, reported Union reinforcements were on the way. Therefore, at 8 PM, Forrest detached Col. Dibrell and Maj. Jesse Forrest each with 100 men to move out toward Humboldt to seize the nearest railroad stations, with orders to capture any approaching trains and to destroy any tracks of the Mobile and Ohio line. At the same time, Forrest sent Col. Biffle south to Bolivar to carry out the same mission. Dibrell captured the garrison of 100 men and their supplies by 2 AM, about 8 miles north of Jackson, and Maj. Forrest also captured his garrison of 75 men and supplies; Biffle captured 50 men and supplies. With all three leaders having destroyed enough railroad track to wreak havoc upon the Mobile and Ohio for the foreseeable future, they returned to the Confederate camp by daybreak on December 19. The spoils of war to this point were distributed to the CSA troops, replacing the inferior supplies with which they had entered the field eight days earlier.

Officially the federal troops in Jackson were no less than 10,000 and perhaps as much as 13,000. Local citizens stated the Union force numbered more than 15,000. The Battle of Jackson is the first documented time that Forrest used the ruse of spreading his command thinly over a wide area to make his force appear larger; he also commanded the drums of his unit to be beaten in such a manner as to mimic the sound of a heavy infantry force.

In the afternoon of December 19, Forrest left Col. Robert M. Russell as a rear guard with 2,000 men while he continued his advance toward the town. Union Brig. Gen. Jeremiah C. Sullivan, in command of the troops defending Jackson, ordered Col. Adolph Engelmann to lead two infantry regiments northeast of the town in anticipation of Forrest's attack. Forrest ordered a cavalry charge against Engelmann's troops, who successfully repulsed the attack before retreating to Jackson again. In fact, Forrest did not intend to attack the town with the bulk of his army, and the charge against Engelmann amounted to little more than a means of occupying Union attentions while two other mounted columns destroyed railroad track to the north and south of the town. By 8 PM on December 19, Forrest had reassembled his unit, now holding 500 prisoners, 25 "excellent" wagons, his artillery by a section and well-armed and fully munitioned troops. He quickly retreated from Jackson and moved to attack Trenton and Humboldt.

== Capture of Trenton ==
At 5 AM on December 20, Col. Dibrell's regiment was sent to destroy a rail bridge at Spring Creek. Here he captured 100 more Yankees along with their arms and supplies. At the same time, Col. Starnes' regiment and a squadron from Biffle's regiment as well as Capt. William H. Forrest's independent company, approximately 750 men in total, were dispatched to capture the town of Humboldt, which was completed by 10 PM. The Confederates captured four caissons with their horses, about 500 stands of arms, 300,000 rounds of small-arms ammunition and a multitude of other supplies.

During this time Forrest was moving toward Trenton with his escort and the captured guns noted above. He had also added 160 new volunteers from Hickman and Perry counties. Forrest again left Col. Russell as his rear guard, who again captured federals with their supplies. Russell met up with Forrest in Trenton later that night.

Forrest reached Trenton at 10 PM on December 20, and began the attack forthwith with Maj. Nicholas N. Cox on his right. Forrest charged through town with his escort, during which two of his men were killed and three wounded, and then withdrew approximately 200 yards to what is now the Trenton Cemetery. Forrest fired his big guns toward the depot; after a brief skirmish, Capt. J.P. Strange, the Confederate Adjutant, posted the artillery and began firing again. When white flags were shown, Strange was directed to receive the surrender. Meeting with Union Col. Jacob Fry, an elderly officer asking the terms of surrender, Forrest replied, "unconditional". Realizing he had no other alternative, Col. Fry unswung his sword and handed it to Forrest, remarking sadly that it had been in his family for 40 years. General Forrest received the sword and handled it for an instant, then turned back to the colonel and said, "Take back your sword Colonel as it is a family relic; but I hope sir when next worn it will be in a better cause than that of attempting the subjugation of your countrymen." This type of charity by Forrest to his enemies was documented many times. In the course of the surrender ceremony, a fire broke out which was obviously set by the federals to prevent the Confederates from gaining the spoils of war. Forrest, along with Maj. Strange, pistols in hand, forced the federal prisoners to fight the fire or be shot. The general then turned to Col. Fry to inform him that the culprits would be punished in the "most summary manner".

Forrest with his escort and the new green volunteers managed to capture Trenton as the rest of his unit was scattered throughout the region. Forrest had no more than 275 men but captured 400 federal soldiers, including Colonels Fry and Hawkins, several field officers, 300 negroes, 1000 horses and mules, 13 wagons and ambulances, 7 caissons, 20,000 artillery rounds, 400,000 small-arms rounds, 100,000 rations of subsistence, large amounts of cavalry equipment, quartermaster stores, and soldier baggage, collectively valued at more than $500,000 (equivalent to $16,100,000 in 2025). Forrest paroled some 1,300 Union officers and enlisted men to return home, as the captured POWs were growing too numerous to manage. Some 800–900 remained prisoners and were marched under the command of Lt. Col. Nathan D. Collins to be turned over to the federals in Columbus, Kentucky.

== Union City and turnaround ==
On the morning of December 21, Forrest resumed his advance toward Union City while Dibrell stayed as rear guard. Seven miles north, near Dyer, Tennessee, Forrest captured a garrison of 30 men and its supplies. He burned more bridges and rails and traveled another seven miles, where he overtook his Commissary Maj. G.V. Rambaut. There was considerable federal resistance, and a firefight broke out against 250 federals who retreated to their fortification at Kenton Station (present-day Kenton, Tennessee). Forrest surrounded the stockade to prevent escape into the Obion Bottoms; after a few cannon shots the stockade surrendered with white flags fluttering from all directions. His men began to tear up all of the rails and burn all trestles in the vicinity. That night, Col. Starnes was ordered to destroy all rails along the 15-mile stretch of the Obion Bottoms.

The next morning, scouts reported that a federal force of some 10,000 men was moving from Jackson at a rapid pace. Despite this, Forrest continued his mission to Union City, still some 20 miles further up the road. In the meantime, Lt. Col. Collins was en route to Columbus and happened upon a beleaguered federal force who surrendered by his demand. Collins captured 250 men and supplies. On December 22, Forrest encamped and made haste to parole his new prisoners acquired since leaving Trenton. On December 23, some 300 men who were turned over to Col. Collins (approximately 1,400 men now) were sent to Columbus. Also on the 23rd, federal soldiers at an outpost near Moscow, Kentucky, some 12 miles distant, fled toward Columbus upon seeing the Confederates.

Reaching the northernmost point of his mission, Forrest turned south to return some 12 miles south of Union City. A courier from Col. Starnes informed him they had destroyed the trestle works to the south of the Obion River. The entire command spent December 24 and 25 demolishing the solid heavy trestles on the North and South Forks of the Obion River, then rested for a few hours. Reports stated that Trenton was now occupied with 12,000 Union troops with the mission to destroy General Forrest's unit.

On December 26, Forrest's men destroyed the railroad bridge over the North Fork of the Obion, the Paducah Branch. Forrest then put his whole force in motion toward Dresden, Tennessee, 26 miles away, and camped near there for the night while waiting for scouting reports. Federals were rapidly advancing toward Union City from Trenton by road and a movement was made in force up the Obion in the direction of McLemoresville and Huntington to cut off the Confederates. On December 27, Forrest moved his command toward Huntington, encamping at McKenzie's Station on the Memphis, Clarksville and Louisville Railroad. Col. Russell was sent as vanguard to seize and hold a crossing over the Obion. However, the federals had already destroyed all bridges south of the high road leading from Jackson to Paris, Tennessee; Col. Russell encountered heavy resistance but eventually forded the Obion and held his position.

Maj. Cox was sent at double-time to seize the road from Paris to Huntington. In the ensuing time, Forrest made passage across the Obion near McLemoresville using an impassable bridge that the federals had abandoned. The locals in McLemoresville called this a "double bridge". Forrest reached it at 11 PM and began cutting timbers to reinforce the bridge. It took one hour to double the bridge. To convince his men that the bridge was safe, Forrest led the way across it. The earth was frozen so the Confederates had to fill the potholes with coffee and flour to allow passage. The men had to wade waist deep in mud, water and sleet but finally effected full passage by around 6 AM on December 29. The men were then given four hours to rest.

By 10 AM, scouts reported that 10,000 Union soldiers were 12 miles distant in Huntington. The Confederates were on the move toward Lexington over nearly impassable terrain and encamped nine miles from that location. Another battle from Forrest's command occurred during this time in Clarksburg, Tennessee, led by his younger brother Capt. Forrest.

== Battle of Parker's Cross Roads ==
His troops quite fatigued, Forrest decided to camp, risking a battle the next day versus moving on. They rested until 4 AM the next morning before moving out on the final leg of the campaign.

On December 30, Forrest's men moved speedily toward Red Mound or Parker's Cross Roads. About one-and-a-half miles from the crossroads, Forrest placed his men in line for battle. The federals appeared from the north-northeast and formed an opposing battle line. A battle ensued and the federals retreated toward the crossroads. The federals reformed their battle lines with 1,800 men to Forrest's 1,200 men: Morton's battery in the center, Freeman's battery on the flanks, and General Forrest driving the entire line.

Col. Cyrus L. Dunham stated in his official report that the CSA had 8,000 men to his smaller force consisting of the 39th Iowa Infantry, 50th Indiana Infantry, and the 22nd and 100th Illinois Infantry regiments, as well as companies A and E of the 18th Illinois Infantry, a total of 1,554 men. However, an embedded reporter with the Chicago Tribune reported a total of 1,824 strong.

By 11 AM, after hours of fighting, the Confederates continued to push back the Union force with their heavy guns. The federals stated in their reports that the Confederates were well-positioned, as every advance by the federals was being slaughtered. Here Col. Thomas A. Napier charged a fence line of federals to fall mortally wounded. Col. Napier in his martial ardor compelled him forward without proper reflection, costing him his life.

Forrest then threw Col. Russell around the left flank and rear with the artillery set to enfilade the enemy. The Union line gave way with white flags flying. In the meantime a fresh federal force of two brigades came up from the Confederate rear, in a sense trapping them. A federal officer called for Forrest to halt and surrender. Forrest promptly replied that he had already done so some time since but would move up what remained of his command and "surrender" in form; with this he turned his horse to gallop away in the direction of his troops, notifying the inmates of his hospital that they could make their escape. Rejoining his command, he double-timed from left flank; as Forrest was escaping, the federals came upon their injured comrades and resumed the battle. Maj. Cox with Napier's men was captured with about 250 men.

In the ensuing battles, Forrest's Confederates were caught in the open and the federals were now firing from the ridge that the CSA had occupied hours before. Forrest made one of his mad-dash charges toward the federal lines, dispersing their gunners and creating confusion. This allowed his command to regain their mounts. Col. Starnes came back into the fray with 250 men, which allowed Forrest to regroup with another 200 men; he came up 800 yards east of Parker's house and threw himself upon the rear of Dunham's brigade, recapturing his wagon train.

In the battles of the day from 6 AM to 3 PM, Confederate losses were 25 officers, including Col. Napier, 75 wounded and 250 captured, as well as three artillery pieces, four caissons, five wagons, two ambulances and 75,000 rounds of ammo. Union losses were 50 killed, 100 captured, and three guns hors de combat, as well as two caissons, 15 wagons, two ambulances and a multitude of other supplies captured.

An explanation follows on how a wary and alert General Forrest could be caught "unaware" of General Jeremiah C. Sullivan's fresh force. Forrest had made a proper provision to guard against such by ordering the detachment of a battalion of the 4th Tennessee to proceed to Clarksburg on the Huntington Road with the object of holding that approach in close observation. Capt. McLemore, with three companies (100 men), was given vaguely worded instructions other than reconnaissance near Clarksburg. When he heard the fighting he traversed through the woods to join in the fray and therefore was not on the main road when Sullivan appeared from the rear.

Upon his safe escape from Parker's Cross Roads, Forrest halted in Lexington, 12 miles from the battlefield, and allowed his animals to be fed, treated the wounded, and went in motion back toward the town of Clifton. Ten miles further into the journey back, he paroled his prisoners and his men rested here until daybreak. Forrest's intentions were to cross the Tennessee River at Perryville, now the very end of Kentucky Lake near Mousetail State Park.

Early in the morning, the scouts came back with information that 10,000 federals were moving from Purdy to Jacks Creek–Clifton, with the intention of cutting off the Confederate retreat to Middle Tennessee. Forrest galloped for 15 miles to catch his main command 11 miles from Clifton. Approximately eight miles from the river crossing, the advance party led by Col. Dibrell encountered 1,200 federals. He received the order to charge. The charge tore the federals asunder. Col. Starnes then cut left and Col. Biffle cut right, promptly scattering the federals with 20 killed and 50 captured. It was noon (meridian) when the river crossing was reached and it took eight hours to ply the river. Some 1,000 animals came back with Forrest's command, as well as 60 wagons, four ambulances, and a multitude of supplies.

== Summary ==
Forrest's expedition into West Tennessee had started with orders received on December 10, 1862. His army crossed the river into West Tennessee on December 15. In the short interval between December 15, 1862, and January 1, 1863, seldom in the annals of war had more hard swift riding as many sharp recounters, affluent in results, been crowded in the same brief time period. That command averaged over 20 miles (32 km) per day, fought three well-contested engagements with daily skirmishes, destroyed 50 large and small bridges on the Mobile and Ohio Railroad and broke up so much trestle work of the road as to render the railroad useless until after the war. The Confederates had captured and burned 18 or 20 stockades, captured or killed 2,500 enemy soldiers, taken or disabled 10 pieces of field artillery, and captured 50 wagons and ambulances with their teams, 10,000 stands of small arms, and one million rounds of ammunition. Having returned thoroughly armed and equipped including blankets, never resting a full night, Forrest left on December 10 or 11 with woeful preparation of weapons and supplies and returned with each man fully armed and his unit carrying a surplus of 500 Enfield rifles, 1,800 blankets, knapsacks, and a seasoned fighting force.

Forrest made camp on January 3, 1863, in Mount Pleasant, home of the Bigby Greys, then went to report to General Braxton Bragg, who was now encamped in Shelbyville, Tennessee. Bragg gave further orders to General Forrest.
