= 7th Tennessee Cavalry Regiment (Union) =

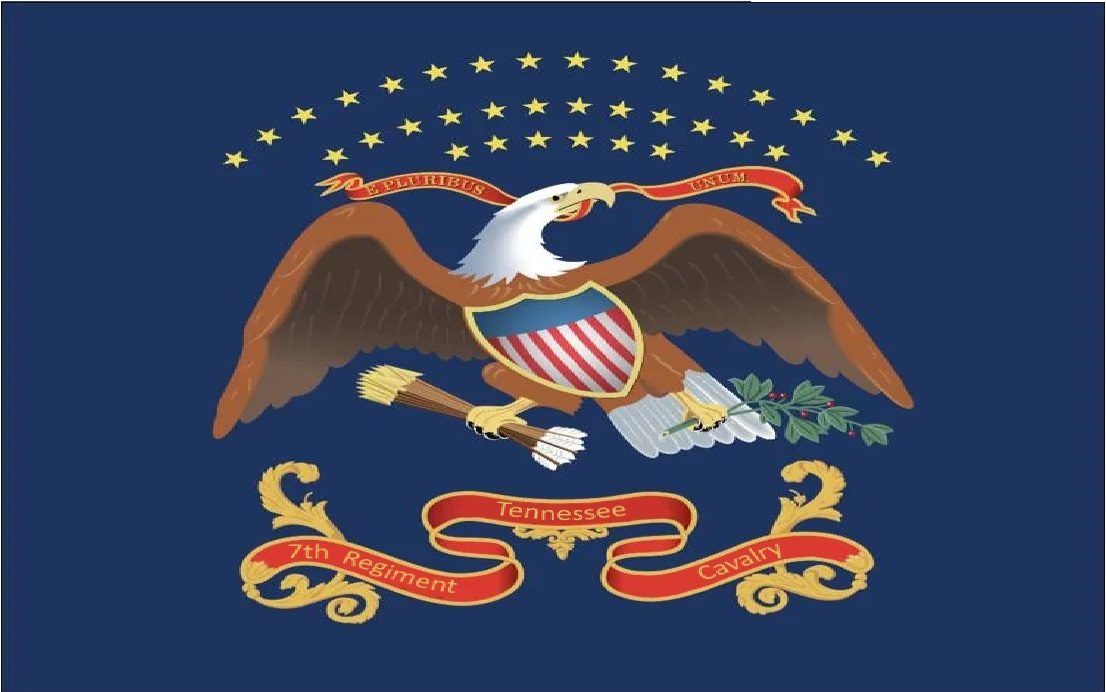
- Active: August 28, 1862, to August 9, 1865
- Country: United States
- Allegiance: Union
- Branch: Cavalry
- Engagements: American Civil War: Battle of Lexington; Battle of Jackson; Battle of Trenton; Battle of Parker's Cross Roads (small detachment); Scout out of La Grange, Tennessee (detachment); 4th Battle of Union City Tennessee

The 7th Tennessee Cavalry Regiment was a cavalry regiment that served in the Union Army during the American Civil War. The regiment was also known as the 2nd West Tennessee Cavalry.

== Service ==
The 7th Tennessee Cavalry was organized at Jackson, Grand Junction, and Trenton, Tennessee and mustered on August 28, 1862, for a three-year enlistment under the command of Colonel Isaac Roberts Hawkins.

The regiment was attached to District of Jackson, Department of the Tennessee, to November 1862. District of Jackson, XIII Corps, Department of the Tennessee, to December 1862. Cavalry Brigade, District of Jackson, XVI Corps, to April 1863. Unassigned, 1st Division, XVI Corps, to June 1863. 4th Brigade, 1st Cavalry Division, XVI Corps, to August 1863. District of Columbus, 6th Division, XVI Corps, to October 1863. Detached Cavalry Brigade, XVI Corps, to December 1863. Waring's Cavalry Brigade, XVI Corps, to January 1864. District of Columbus, Kentucky, to August 1865.

The 7th Tennessee Cavalry mustered out of service August 9, 1865, at Nashville, Tennessee.

== Detailed service ==
Duty in District of Jackson, Tenn., until January 1863. Actions at Salem Cemetery, near Jackson. December 19, and near Jackson December 29, 1862. Near Middleburg December 24. At LaGrange, Moscow and Germantown until June 1863. Expedition to Clifton February 17–21, 1863 (detachment). Scout from LaGrange into northern Mississippi April 29-May 5. Operations in northwest Mississippi June 15–25. Jack's Creek, Tenn., June 20. At Grand Junction June 1863. Skirmishes at and near Union City, Tenn., September 2. At Union City and Colliersville, Tenn., until January 1864. Expedition to Toone Station September 11–16, 1863. Skirmish at Montezuma September 16. (Company A detached at Paducah, Ky.) Skirmish at Dukedom February 28, 1864 (detachment). Skirmish near Union City March 12. Operations against Forrest in western Tennessee March 16-April 14. Reynoldsburg March 21. Attack on Union City March 24 (most of the regiment captured). Scout from Columbus to Hickman, Ky., July 17–18 (detachment). Skirmish near Union City September 2. Duty at Paducah, Ky., until June 1865. Ordered to Rockville, on Tennessee River, June 27, and duty there until August.

On March 24, 1864, at Union City, Tennessee, the regiment was attacked by the 7th Tennessee Cavalry, CSA, under Colonel William L. Duckworth. After repelling four assaults, with a loss of only one killed and two or three wounded, Lieutenant Colonel Hawkins was tricked into an unconditional surrender by Duckworth. Unknown to Hawkins, a federal force of some 2000 men six miles away were marching to his aid. The force surrendered was 16 officers and about 500 men. Captains John W. Beatty and T. P. Gray were among those surrendered, but escaped a few days later. Captain Beatty's report stated: "When we found that Colonel Hawkins had made an unconditional surrender, the officers and men cried like a whipped child. They also cursed Colonel Hawkins, and said he was a traitor, and that they would never serve under him again."

== Commanders ==
- Lieutenant Colonel Isaac Roberts Hawkins - commissioned colonel September 12, 1862, but mustered as lieutenant colonel

== Casualties ==
The regiment lost a total of 337 men during service; 8 enlisted men killed or mortally wounded, 1 officer and 328 enlisted men died of disease.

== See also ==
- List of Tennessee Civil War units
- Tennessee in the Civil War
