= Arthur Evans (author) =

Early gay rights advocate and author (1942–2011)

- Born: Arthur Scott Evans; October 12, 1942 York, Pennsylvania, U.S.
- Died: September 11, 2011 (aged 68) San Francisco, California, U.S.
- Occupation: Gay rights activist, author
- Education: Brown University; City College of New York (BA); Columbia University (MA, PhD)
- Partner: Arthur Bell (1964–1971); Jacob Schraeter (1972–1981)

Arthur Scott Evans (October 12, 1942 – September 11, 2011) was an early gay rights advocate and author, best known for his 1978 book Witchcraft and the Gay Counterculture. Politically active in New York City in the 1960s and early 1970s, he and his partner began a homestead in Washington state in 1972, then later moved to San Francisco where he became a fixture in the Haight-Ashbury neighborhood. In his later years, Evans remained politically active and continued as a translator and academic. His 1997 book Critique of Patriarchal Reason argued that misogyny had influenced "objective" fields such as logic and physics.

== Early life and education ==
Evans was born on October 12, 1942 in York, Pennsylvania. His father was a factory worker, while his mother ran a beauty shop in the front of their family home. Evans graduated from public high school in 1960, afterwards receiving a four-year scholarship from the Glatfelter Paper Company in York to study chemistry at Brown University. Evans and several friends founded the Brown Freethinkers Society, a group of self-professed "militant atheists" working against organized religion, which picketed Brown's required weekly chapel services. The story was picked up nationally. As a result, the paper company canceled Evans' scholarship, and Evans contacted Joseph Lewis, president of the Freethinkers Society, and Lewis threatened the paper company with a lawsuit if the scholarship were dropped. The scholarship stayed in place, with Evans switching to a major in political science. Evans withdrew from Brown and moved to Greenwich Village in 1963, which he later described as the best move he ever made in his life. Evans was admitted to City College of New York in 1966, switching his major to philosophy from political science, and graduating in 1967. He afterwards joined the doctoral program at Columbia in philosophy, where he focused on ancient Greek philosophy while continuing to take part in protests. His doctoral advisor was Paul Oskar Kristeller.

== Career in writing and activism ==
=== New York City ===
He became politically active in the 1960s, participating in his first sit-in on May 13, 1966, when he and other students occupied the administration building of City College in protest against the college's involvement in Selective Service. He also participated in a number of anti-war protests, including the 1968 Columbia protests. In 1967, Evans signed a public statement declaring his intention to refuse to pay income taxes in protest against the U.S. war against Vietnam. He also participated in the protests at the 1968 Democratic National Convention in Chicago. While at Columbia, Evans joined the Student Homophile League, founded by Nino Romano and Stephen Donaldson, although Evans himself was still closeted.

He was not at the Stonewall Riots in 1969, but they did fuel him into a "militant fervor," according to the New York Times, and inspired him to join the Gay Liberation Front along with Arthur Bell. Within GLF, he co-created a cell called the Radical Study Group to examine the history of homophobia and sexism, with participants including Evans, Bell, John Lauritsen, Larry Mitchell, and Steve Dansky. However, he and others felt the group was not coherent and assertive enough, and also that it was diluting its effectiveness by focusing on issues such as racial discrimination and the Vietnam War. On December 21, 1969, Evans, Marty Robinson, and several others met to found the early gay rights group Gay Activists Alliance, with a more aggressive ethos than GLF and 12 starting members. Evans wrote the group's statement of purpose, as well as much of its constitution. Based out of New York, the group used methods such as "zaps" to draw attention to discrimination, confronting Mayor John V. Lindsay and demonstrating against legislation of the time, for example a regulation at the time requiring gay people to get approval from a psychiatrist before being allowed to drive a taxi. Evans was often arrested for the zaps.

Although not yet out as gay to his family, in November 1970, he appeared on The Dick Cavett Show with other leaders Marty Robinson, along with Dick Leitsch of the Mattachine Society, making them among the first openly gay activists to be prominently featured on a national TV program.

=== Washington years ===
Withdrawing from Columbia in 1972, in 1972, Evans and his lover Jacob Schraeter left New York, purchasing a 40-acre (16-hectare) plot of forest in northeastern Washington state. Naming the land New Sodom and living in tents during the summers, Evans, Schraeter, and a third member formed the Weird Sisters Partnership group, named after the trio in Macbeth, a homesteading collective seeking self-sufficiency, with the group living off wild berries and vegetables. During winter months in Seattle, Evans continued research that he had begun in New York on the underlying historical origins of the counterculture, focusing in part on the sexual history of the counterculture. He published some of his research in 1973 in the journal Out, and later in Fag Rag. The Advocate also published a column written by Evans on the political strategy of zapping.

=== Years in San Francisco ===
When the Washington living experiment "failed," he and his companion moved to San Francisco, and Evans in 1974 moved into an apartment at the corner of Haight and Ashbury Streets. Opening a Volkswagen repair business called the Buggery, Evans also began writing a book on homophobia and persecution in the Middle Ages. In 1975, he formed the Faery Circle in San Francisco. The gay pagan-inspired group was devoted to ritual play, and later influenced the Radical Faeries. Evans has described the group as bringing together "gay sensibility, neo-paganism, and a sheer Whitmanesque celebration of the body and of sex." At 32 Page Street, an early San Francisco gay community center, in early 1976 he gave a series of public "Faeries" lectures based on his research on the historical origins of the gay counterculture.

In 1978 he published his recent research in Witchcraft and the Gay Counterculture: A Radical View of Western Civilization and Some of the People it Has Tried to Destroy, which analyzed evidence that many people accused of "witchcraft" and "heresy" during the Middle Ages and the Renaissance were specifically persecuted for their sexuality and ancient pagan practices. Published by the independent Boston imprint Fag Rag Books, the work considered, among other topics, early Celtic rituals and their connection with sexual traditions in gay culture. Historian Rollan McCleary has referred to the book as an "influential cult classic." Others have noted the book's cultural import, describing it "less a history of persecution than it is an invocational litany or an aggrieved magical treatise on the failures of patriarchal liberalism and industrial socialism to adequately recognize and protect the lives of gay people." Witchcraft and the Gay Counterculture was "an apposite resource on the history of social oppression." where Evans argues that magic is an "inherently collective activity, depending for its practice on group song, dance, sex and ecstasy." A poem from the book was included on the 2014 album Why Do The Heathen Rage? by The Soft Pink Truth. A planned re-release with the title The Lady Rises in the East was eventually published with other collected materials under the title The Evans Symposium: Witchcraft and the Gay Counterculture and Moon Lady Rising in 2018.

Among other groups, Evans was involved with the Bay Area Gay Liberation (BAGL) and the San Francisco Gay Democratic Club. In the late 1970s, Evans became known for distributing his own satirical pamphlets under the nom de plume "The Red Queen." The pamphlets, including one in 1978 titled "Afraid You’re Not Butch Enough?", satirized what Evans saw as a growing pattern of butch conformity overtaking gay men in the Castro neighborhood, presaging the "Castro clone" moniker. Against the "hyper-masculine Castro clone identity" drawing men in during the disco era, he continued his research into faeries and male involvement in Western spiritual traditions.

=== Later writings and activism ===
With the onset of the AIDS crisis in the 1980s, Evans became involved with several groups, which converged into ACT UP/SF. He was once arrested while protesting the price-increases on AIDS drugs by pharmaceutical companies along with his friend Hank Wilson.

He directed a 1984 production at the Valencia Rose Cabaret in San Francisco using his own translation of The Bacchae by Euripides, which features Dionysos, patron of homosexuality. The translation along with his commentary were published in New York by St. Martin's Press as The God of Ecstasy in 1988.

He began work on a nine-year philosophy project in 1988. It was published in 1997 as the Critique of Patriarchal Reason subsequent to a grant by the San Francisco Arts Commission, including art by Frank Pietronigo. In the book he argued that misogyny had influenced "objective" fields such as logic and physics. As an overview of the history of Western philosophy, the book focuses on how "misogyny and homophobia have influenced the supposedly objective fields of formal logic, higher mathematics, and physical science." Evans former doctoral advisor, Kristeller, called the book "a major contribution to the study of philosophy and its history." He focused the book in part on the internal homophobia of gay thinker Ludwig Wittgenstein, and how Wittgenstein's conflicted attitude affected his thinking and logic.

== Personal life ==
He became romantically involved with Arthur Bell in 1964, and the two separated in 1971. He met Jacob Schraeter in 1972 and they spent two years homesteading together in Washington state. The two moved to San Francisco in 1974, and although Schraeter returned to New York in 1981, Evans remained at the apartment at the corner of Haight Ashbury for the remainder of his life. Diagnosed with an aortic aneurysm in October 2010, Evans died in his Haight-Ashbury apartment of a massive heart attack on September 11, 2011. He was survived by his brother, Joe and his best friend Naphtali Offen.

== Publications ==
- 1978: Witchcraft and the Gay Counterculture
- 1988: The God of Ecstasy
- 1997: Critique of Patriarchal Reason
- 2018: The Evans Symposium: Witchcraft and the Gay Counterculture and Moon Lady Rising
