= Battle of Lexington (disambiguation) =

Battle of Lexington may refer to:

- Battle of Lexington in Massachusetts, a 1775 skirmish which opened the American Revolutionary War
- First Battle of Lexington in Missouri, an 1861 battle of the American Civil War
- Second Battle of Lexington in Missouri, an 1864 battle of the American Civil War
- Battle of Lexington, Tennessee, an 1862 battle of the American Civil War
