= I. Newton Baker =

American writer and editor

Isaac Newton Baker (March 12, 1838 – March 23, 1923) was an American writer and editor who was private secretary to, and biographer of, Robert G. Ingersoll. He was an editor of the American Sunday-School Times.

He was born in Philadelphia, where he died in 1923 of arteriosclerotic heart disease.
