= Battle of Jackson (disambiguation) =

The Battle of Jackson occurred at Jackson, Mississippi, on May 14, 1863, as part of the Vicksburg campaign of the American Civil War

Battle of Jackson may also refer to:

- Battle of Jackson, Tennessee (December 19, 1862), also during the American Civil War
- Jackson Expedition (July 1863), confrontation at Jackson, Mississippi, in the aftermath of the surrender of Vicksburg

== See also ==
- Jackson (disambiguation)
- Jackson's Valley campaign
- Stonewall Jackson
