= Maud Ingersoll Probasco =

American suffragist and animal rights activist

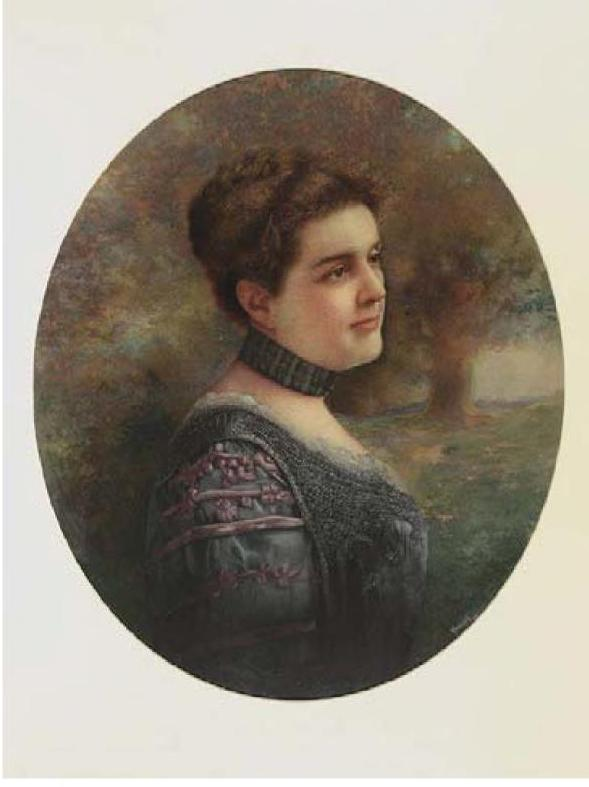
- portrait by C. A. Wittemore, 1917
- Born: November 4, 1864; Peoria
- Died: February 12, 1936 (aged 71); New York City
- Occupation: Suffragist
- Parent(s): Robert G. Ingersoll
- Relatives: Eva Ingersoll Brown

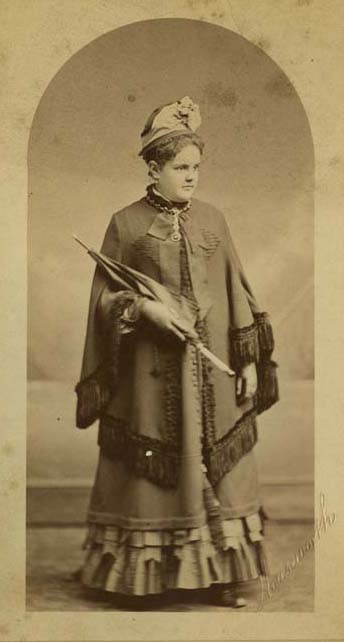
Maud Ingersoll Probasco

Maud Ingersoll Probasco (November 4, 1864 – February 12, 1936) was an American suffragist and animal rights activist.

== Early life and education ==
She was born Maud Robert Ingersoll on November 4, 1864 in Peoria, Illinois, the younger of two daughters of Robert G. Ingersoll, the American lawyer, writer, and orator known as "The Great Agnostic", and his wife Eva Amelia Parker. (Robert Ingersoll gave both of his daughters the middle name Robert.)

The Ingersoll sisters grew up in a four-story home in Peoria known as the Cockle Mansion, with a large extended family. Ingersoll held progressive views about the intellectual capabilities of women, and his daughters studied literature, art, music (Maud was a contralato), and languages. They were taught by private tutors, as Ingersoll was a believer in secular education and wished to avoid Christian teachings in the schools of the day. In 1878, the Ingersoll family moved to Washington, DC, to a house in Lafayette Square near the White House. The family hosted large weekly gatherings which included politicians, businessmen, artists, and other leading figures discussed the issues of the day, further broadening the sisters' education.

In late 1885, the Ingersoll family moved to a mansion at 101 Fifth Avenue in New York City.

== Activism ==
Ingersoll and her aunt Sue M. Farrell were members of the New York Anti-Vivisection Society, founded in 1908 by Diana Belais to campaign against vivisection, animal cruelty, and human experimentation. After a falling out with the organization, Ingersoll and Farrell founded their own organization in 1912, the Vivisection Investigation League, serving as corresponding secretary and president, respectively. The Vivisection Investigation League criticized work done by The Rockefeller Institute for Medical Research (a favorite target for anti-vivisection groups) and specifically the experiments of Hideyo Noguchi, who was developing a skin test for syphilis and tested his work on children. Ingersoll was also active with the American Society for the Prevention of Cruelty to Animals.

Ingersoll was an active suffragist in New York state. She was treasurer of the New York State Woman Suffrage Association in 1913. She served as a poll watcher and was a delegate to the New York State Convention of the National Progressive Party and for the Women's Political Union.

She headed the Robert Ingersoll Monument Association in an unsuccessful effort to place a monument to her late father designed by Gutzon Borglum in Washington, DC.

She was also a member of the American Birth Control League and vice-president of Freethinkers of America.

== Marriage ==
Ingersoll married Wallace McLean Probasco on December 30, 1912, in New York City in an "ethical ritual" presided over by Dr. John Lovejoy Elliott of the Ethical Culture Society. Wallace Probasco was general manager and director of the New Century Color Plate Company, and nephew of Supreme Court Justice John McLean.

Wallace Probasco engaged in a long extramarital affair with Mazie Ingersoll (no relation), wife of the wealthy watchmaker Robert H. Ingersoll. On December 19, 1926, in her apartment at 55 Park Avenue in New York City, both Wallace Probasco and Mazie Ingersoll were shot, and the latter killed. According to Wallace Probasco, he had broken off their affair, intending to return to his wife, and she shot him twice and committed suicide. A homicide case against Wallace Probasco was dismissed the following year. The Probascos reconciled.

== Death ==
Maud Ingersoll Probasco died on February 12, 1936, at Booth Memorial Hospital in New York City.
