= Eva Ingersoll Wakefield =

- Born: Eva Ingersoll Brown; 1892; Dobbs Ferry, New York, US
- Died: 1 April 1970 (aged 77–78); Fairfield, Connecticut, US
- Occupations: Writer, poet, activist, humanist
- Organization(s): Vivisection Investigation League, Women's International League for Peace and Freedom, American Humanist Association
- Relatives: Robert G. Ingersoll (grandfather); Eva Parker Ingersoll (grandmother); Maud Ingersoll Probasco (aunt)

Eva Ingersoll Brown Wakefield (1892 – 1 April 1970) was a writer, poet, freethinker, and an authority on the life of Robert G. Ingersoll, her grandfather.

== Personal life ==
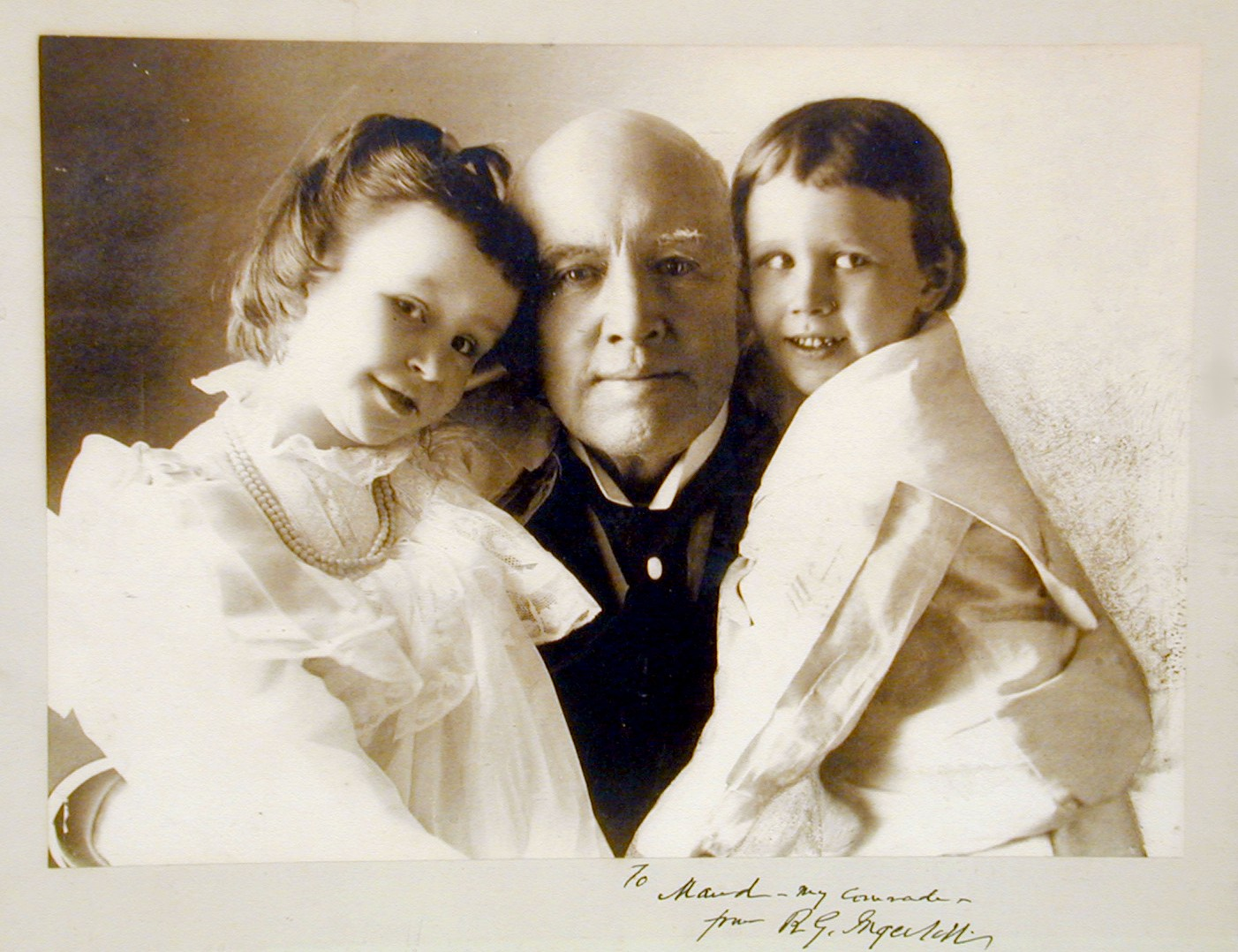
Eva Ingersoll Brown Wakefield as a child in 1899, with her grandfather, Robert G. Ingersoll, and brother, Robert G. Ingersoll Brown.

Eva Ingersoll Brown Wakefield was born in Dobbs Ferry, New York in 1892, the daughter of Walston H. and Eva Ingersoll Brown. Her mother, Eva Ingersoll Brown, was a suffragist and activist. She was tutored as a child, and later graduated from Columbia University.

In 1917, Brown married McNeal Swasey, but they later divorced. She married Sherman Day Wakefield, an author, editor, and bibliographer, in 1932. The wedding was performed by John Lovejoy Elliott of the New York Society for Ethical Culture, at the home of her aunt, Maud Ingersoll Probasco. Sherman Wakefield was on the editorial staff of The Humanist and also of Progressive World. Eva herself was a contributor to The Humanist, as well as writing poetry. One of her poems was included in an anthology compiled by Edwin Markham, with whom she studied.

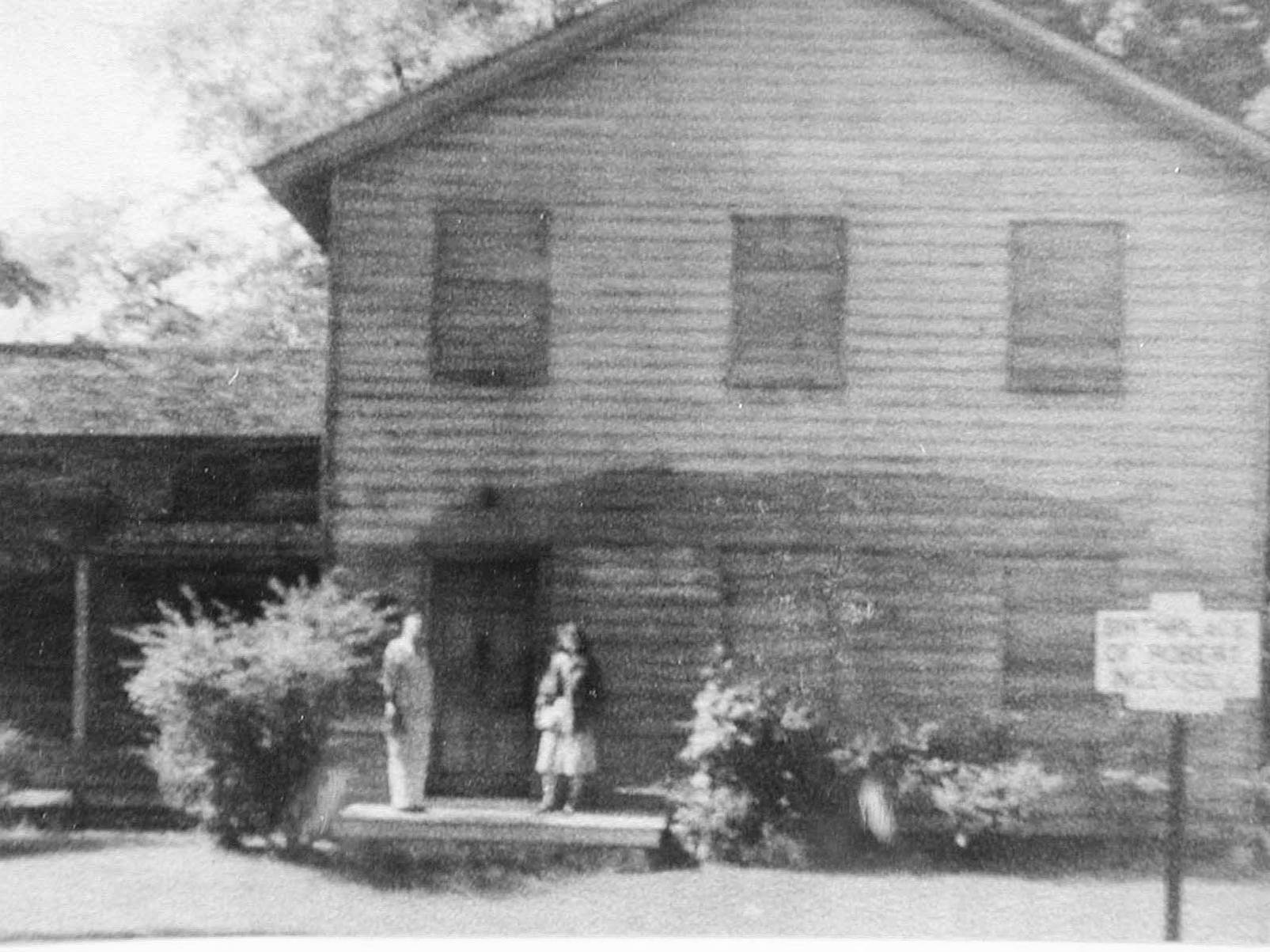
Ingersoll's birthplace in the 1950s. Eva Ingersoll Wakefield was secretary of the association which maintained it.

A passionate defender of her grandfather's legacy, Eva Ingersoll Wakefield published The Life and Letters of Robert G. Ingersoll in 1951, and later donated a significant amount of 'Ingersolliana' to the Library of Congress, the Abraham Lincoln Presidential Library and Museum, and other archives. As well as personal collections and copies of letters kept by her mother (Ingersoll's daughter) and aunt, Wakefield gathered correspondence from letters and journals, and from the collection of Harry Houdini.

== Activism ==
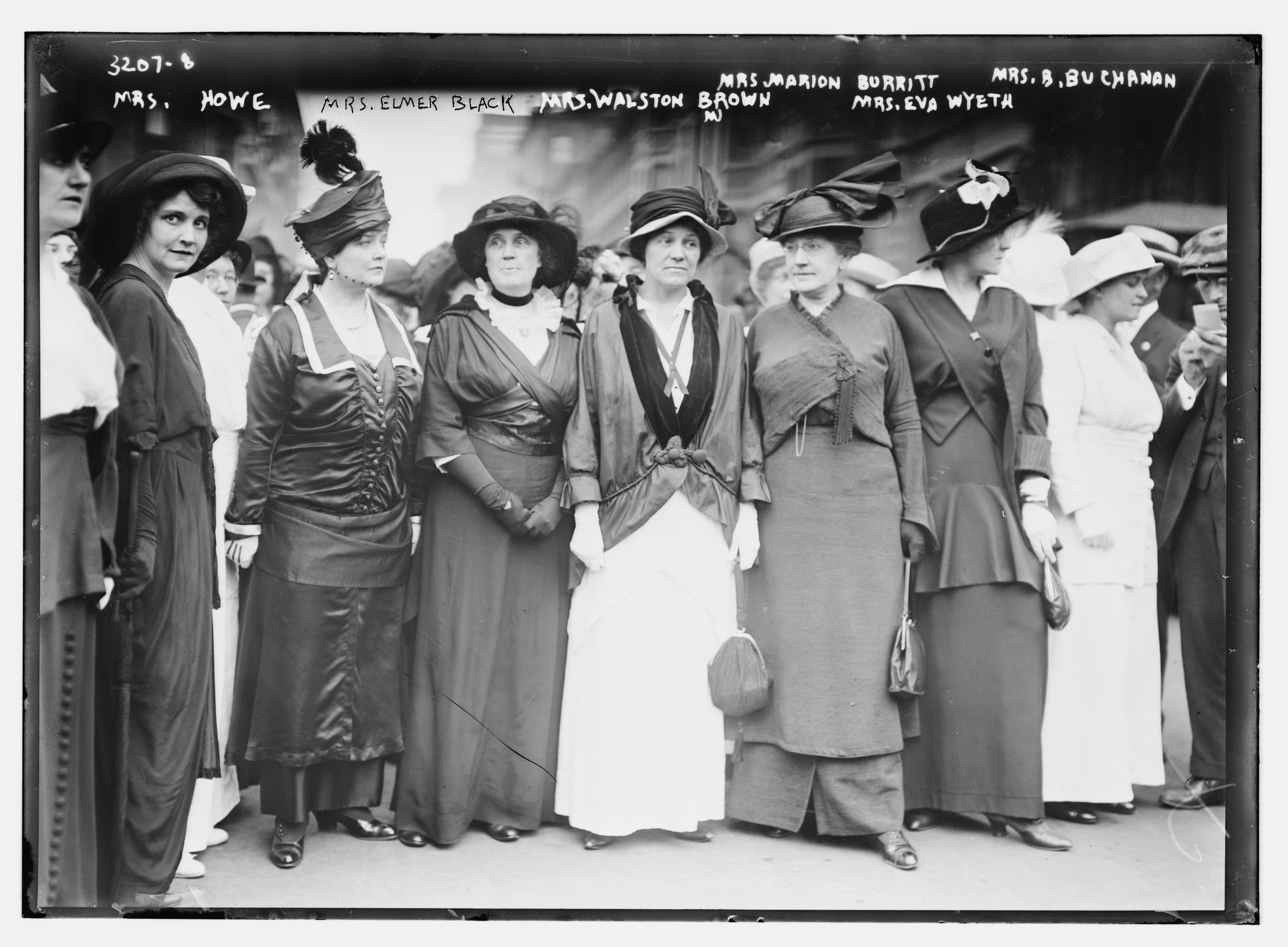
Eva Ingersoll Wakefield's mother, Eva Ingersoll Brown (third from left) with fellow suffragists in 1909

Eva Ingersoll Brown Wakefield was one of the earliest members of the First Humanist Society of New York, founded in 1929, and later President of the New York Chapter of the American Humanist Association.

During the 1930s, Wakefield was active in the Manhattan Branch of the Women's International League for Peace and Freedom. She was also director of the Vivisection Investigation League and a member of the National Society of Colonial Dames in the State of New York.

In addition to editing The Life and Letters of Robert G. Ingersoll, Wakefield was secretary of the Robert G. Ingersoll Memorial Association. which maintained the Robert Ingersoll Birthplace in Dresden, N.Y., as a museum.

== Death ==
She died on 1 April 1970 at the Carleton Hospital in Fairfield, Connecticut. At her memorial service, in lieu of flowers, contributions to the R.G. Ingersoll Memorial Association were requested. Sherman Day Wakefield died the following year.
