= Wheless =

Wheless is a surname. Notable people with the surname include:

- Hewitt T. Wheless (1913-1986), American military officer
- Joseph Wheless (1868-1950), American lawyer
- Troy Wheless (born 1980), American basketball player

== See also ==
- Thomas and Lois Wheless House, a historic house in North Carolina, U.S.
