= Eva Parker Ingersoll =

American freethinker and activist

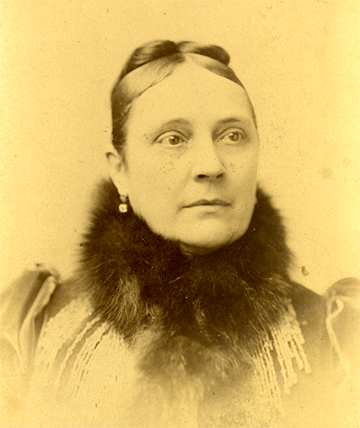
- Born: Eva Amelia Parker; 4 May 1841; Groveland, Illinois, U.S.
- Died: 2 February 1923 (aged 81); New York, U.S.
- Resting place: Arlington National Cemetery
- Spouse: Robert G. Ingersoll
- Children: Eva Ingersoll Brown; Maud Ingersoll Probasco
- Relatives: Eva Ingersoll Wakefield (granddaughter)

Eva Parker Ingersoll (née Eva Amelia Parker; 4 May 1841 – 2 February 1923) was an American freethinker, activist, and the wife of Robert G. Ingersoll, said to have been a significant influence on the development of her husband's own humanism.

== Early life ==
Eva Amelia Parker was born in Groveland, Illinois. Her parents were freethinkers: admirers of Thomas Paine and Voltaire. Eva's paternal grandmother, Sarah Buckman Parker, was described as bright and a noted “infidel.”

Robert Ingersoll was a lawyer and lecturer, who became best known as 'the great agnostic'. Eva Parker was described as being 'as free a thinker' as he was. The couple met when Ingersoll, defending a client in Groveland, was invited to dine with the Parkers. The family were described as being 'good heretics and "infidels" on their own account' and, as such, had been 'intensely interested in Robert ever since he made his first anti-theological speech, entitled Progress, at Pekin, Illinois, about a year before'.

== Marriage ==
Parker married Robert Green Ingersoll at her family home on 13 February 1862. In his 1927 biography of Robert Ingersoll (who died in 1899), Joseph McCabe wrote of the marriage that:

I dislike gush and will say only, in hackneyed phrase but with sincere meaning, that Ingersoll found an ideal mate. As late as 1913 and 1917 I found the home somehow so full of the spirit and presence of Robert Ingersoll that it was difficult to believe that he was not merely at work up-town and would drop in for dinner... Agnostic like himself, moved and directed by the same high ideals as himself, proud of him and devotedly attached to him, conscious that through him she was working for the world in working for him and his children, Eva Ingersoll found the thing which is as beautiful as it is rare, a perfect home, and she gave American mothers for all time a refulgent example of an entirely sweet and harmonious and serviceable family-life without a little of either the letter or the spirit of Christianity.

This sentiment was echoed in the biography of Robert Ingersoll written by the couple's granddaughter, who wrote:

Robert Ingersoll enjoyed the incomparable blessing of a supremely happy home from the day of his marriage until the day of his death. For thirty-eight years husband and wife were intellectual and spiritual comrades as well as romantic lovers, sharing each other's beliefs, thoughts, and emotions, consecrated to the same ideals and purposes. Robert inscribed his first published volume of lectures to "My Wife, a Woman Without Superstition."

Helen H. Gardener devoted her 1885 work Men, women and gods, and other lectures to Eva Ingersoll, writing:

This little volume is respectfully dedicated, with the love of the author, to Mrs. Eva Ingersoll, the brave, happy wife of America's greatest orator and woman's truest friend. In her beautiful home-life superstition and fear have never entered; human equality and freedom have their highest illustration; and time has deepened youthful love into a diviner worship than angels offer or than gods inspire.

Robert and Eva Ingersoll had two daughters, Eva and Maud, both of whom went on to be prominent activists. Eva Ingersoll Brown's daughter, Eva Ingersoll Brown Wakefield (1892–1970) was, alongside John Dewey, Albert Einstein, Julian Huxley, Thomas Mann, and George W. Rappleyea, an early member of The First Humanist Society of New York, founded in 1929.

== Activism ==
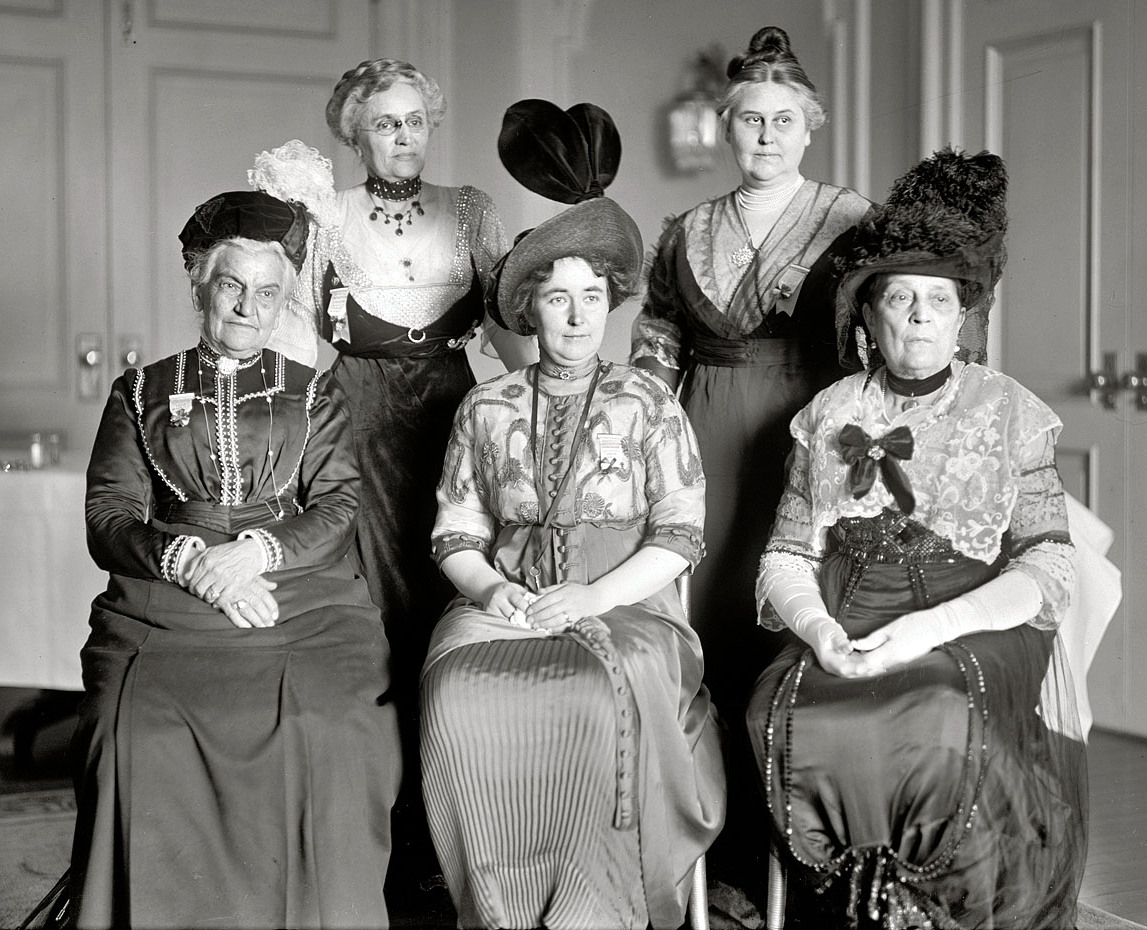
Eva Parker Ingersoll (front row, right) at the International Anti-Vivisection Congress, 1913. Also pictured is her younger sister, Sue M. Farrell (top row, left).

In her biography of Robert Ingersoll, Eva Ingersoll Brown Wakefield also described Eva's activism for a range of causes:

The two Evas and Maud were... women of vast public spirit, passionately concerned with the important issues of the day and of the age. Every movement for the betterment of humanity found in them eager and generous champions: birth control; child welfare; world peace; woman suffrage, and equality for women in all offices and relations of life; purified politics; slum clearance and model housing; prison reform; social justice; opposition to prejudice, injustice, and cruelty wherever found; intellectual liberty—all these they worked for with true Ingersollian enthusiasm, independence, and moral courage. As active members of the Audubon Society, the Society for the Prevention of Cruelty to Animals, and other humane organizations, they fought continuously for the rights of defenceless animals.

Robert Ingersoll himself was associated with English anti-vivisectionists and animal rights advocates, such as Henry Stephens Salt. In 1913, both Eva Ingersoll and her daughter, Maud, were among the Vice Presidents of the International Anti-Vivisection Congress, which had as its object: 'to advocate a consistent opposition to all forms of cruelty to animals.'

== Death ==
Eva Amelia Parker Ingersoll died on 2 February 1923 at her home in New York City, at the age of 82. She was buried in Arlington National Cemetery. Her funeral was conducted by John Lovejoy Elliott, Ethical Culture leader and teacher at the Ethical Culture Fieldston School, who had also led Robert Ingersoll's funeral.
