= 11th Illinois Cavalry Regiment =

11th Regiment Illinois Volunteer Cavalry
- Illinois flag
- Active: December 20, 1861, to September 30, 1865
- Country: United States
- Allegiance: Union
- Branch: Cavalry
- Engagements: Battle of Shiloh; Battle of Corinth; Battle of Lexington; Battle of Egypt Station

The 11th Regiment Illinois Volunteer Cavalry was a cavalry regiment that served in the Union Army during the American Civil War. The regiment was raised by orator Robert Green Ingersoll, who became its first colonel, and Basile D. Weeks.

== Service ==
The 11th Illinois Cavalry was mustered into service at Peoria, Illinois, on December 20, 1861.

The regiment was mustered out on September 30, 1865.

== Total strength and casualties ==
The regiment suffered the loss of two officers and 32 enlisted men who were killed in action or who died of their wounds in addition to eight officers and 237 enlisted men who died of disease, for a total of 279 fatalities.

== Commanders ==
- Colonel Robert Green Ingersoll - resigned June 30, 1863, after his capture on December 18, 1862, at the Battle of Lexington, Tennessee, and subsequent parole.
- Colonel Lucien H. Kerr - mustered out December 19, 1864.
- Colonel Otto Funke - mustered out with the regiment.

== See also ==
- List of Illinois Civil War Units
- Illinois in the American Civil War
