= Joseph Lewis (secularist) =

American activist, publisher, and litigator (1889–1968)

- Born: June 11, 1889; Montgomery, Alabama, U.S.
- Died: November 4, 1968 (aged 79); New York City, U.S.
- Occupations: Author; activist; publisher; litigator
- Years active: 1920–1968
- Organization: Freethinkers of America
- Spouses: Fay Jacobs (m. 1914; div. 1948) Ruth Stoller Grubman (m. 1952)
- Children: 2

Joseph Lewis (June 11, 1889 – November 4, 1968) was an American freethinker and atheist activist, publisher, and litigator. During the mid-twentieth century, he was one of America's most conspicuous public atheists, the other being Emanuel Haldeman-Julius. Born in Montgomery, Alabama to a Jewish family, he was forced by poverty to leave school at the age of nine to find employment. He read avidly, becoming self-educated. Lewis developed his ideas from reading, among others, Robert G. Ingersoll, whose published works made him aware of Thomas Paine. He was first impressed by atheism after having read a large volume of lectures of Ingersoll devoted to his idol Paine, which was brought to their house by his older brother. He later credited Paine's The Age of Reason with helping him abandon theism.

== Career ==
In 1920, Lewis moved to New York where he made contact with The Freethinkers Society, an organization founded in 1915.

As founder of the Truth Publishing Company, he was prosecuted in 1927 by John Saxton Sumner, secretary of the New York Society for the Suppression of Vice, "for publishing and selling William J. Robinson's Sexual Truths....At a hearing [in 1921], one of the counsels stated that a federal indictment was being prepared against Truth, because it was suspected of sending not only information regarding contraception to certain customers but also prophylactics themselves.""

In 1928 Lewis incorporated The Freethinkers Society and renamed it "The Freethinkers of America" and became its president (a title he would keep for the rest of his life). He later started his own publishing company, the Freethought Press Association, through which he published literature about freethought written by himself and others. Lewis' book The Bible Unmasked was published in 1926 and 15000 copies of it were sold. In the 1930s, Lewis expanded his business with a subsidiary, Eugenics Publishing Company, that published literature for common people written by medical experts about subjects such as contraception. Like Haldeman-Julius, Lewis published low-cost books on controversial topics and enjoyed commercial success. Profits from the Eugenics Publishing Company enabled Lewis to live comfortably, with an estate in Westchester County, New York, an apartment on Park Avenue in New York City, and a house in Miami Beach. He was also able to fund the Freethinkers of America's annual deficit; as a result, said freethought historian Robert W. Morrell, "it became in effect his private fiefdom."

A bulletin, The Freethinkers of America, was started by Lewis in 1928. In the 1940s it was renamed Freethinker and in the 1950s to its final name Age of Reason (named after Thomas Paine's book The Age of Reason). Contributors to the bulletin were, among others, William J. Fielding, Corliss Lamont and Franklin Steiner.

Over the years, Lewis brought a series of lawsuits, generally unsuccessful, to challenge what he saw as violations of the separation of church and state. He publicized these suits in the pages of the Freethinkers of America's successive bulletins. He also challenged notable faith healers. Some of his other initiatives proved successful. He raised funds to erect statues of Thomas Paine in Morristown, New Jersey; Paine's birthplace at Thetford, England; and Paris, France. He placed a bust of Paine in New York University's Hall of Fame, though he was unable to place a bust of Ingersoll there. His agitation was at least partly responsible for the issuing (in 1968) of a U.S. postage stamp honoring Paine. (He walked out of its unveiling ceremony in Philadelphia after a prayer was said.) In 1954, he orchestrated the second restoration of the birthplace of nineteenth-century agnostic orator Robert Green Ingersoll; a freethought museum operated at the Dresden, New York, site for several years thereafter.

Lewis believed that Thomas Paine was the true author of the Declaration of Independence, and made his case for this theory in his 1947 book Thomas Paine, Author of the Declaration of Independence. His other noteworthy publications included The Ten Commandments (1946), a lengthy justification for atheism, and An Atheist Manifesto (1954), published at the height of the Cold War to dispute popular ideas that atheism was un-American. He deeply recognized the meaning of Paine's ideas for establishing of the US and acquiring its independence from Great Britain. His first attempt to create a committee in order to include Paine's name in the Hall of Fame of New York was made in 1935 but was interrupted by the World War II. He appreciated Paine a lot for his ideas of "common man" and the freedom of slaves in the US, and Lewis believed that Paine had inspired Jefferson politically.

Lewis maintained rigid control over the Freethinkers of America, leading several honorary vice presidents to resign in frustration. After his death on November 4, 1968, the organization foundered. "It had become too much an extension of Lewis himself," wrote Robert Morrell.

The mid twentieth century – specifically, the period from George MacDonald's retirement as editor of The Truth Seeker in 1937 until the rise of Madalyn Murray O'Hair in 1963 – was a fallow period in American freethought. Lewis and Haldeman-Julius were essentially the only nationally visible public atheists of this period, and of those two, only Lewis was prominent not only as a publisher but as an activist. As for O'Hair (whom Lewis successfully sued for libel in 1967), her rise to prominence was occasioned by her unexpected victory in a U. S. Supreme Court church-state case, one much like the lawsuits Lewis had repeatedly brought to far more modest success. Lewis played an important role as a bridging figure between the Golden Age of Freethought and the reappearance of atheism on the public stage in the 1960s.

== Personal life and death ==
Lewis was the sixth of the eight (or according to one source, eleven) children of Samuel Lewis and Rachel ("Ray") Levy. In 1914 he married Fay Jacobs, with whom he had two children, a son who died in 1920, and a daughter, Claire. While the New Encyclopedia of Unbelief implies that the marriage ended with Fay's death, other sources indicate they were divorced in 1948. In 1952 Lewis married Ruth Stoller Grubman. They remained married until Joseph's death in 1968. His wife as well as his daughter were like-minded persons and had the same opinion on many essential things.

In addition to his devotion to the ideas of Paine and atheism, he liked to study astronomy and physics. Lewis was a theater-goer and was a fan of Ibsen.

He died of a heart attack at the age of 79 in his office.

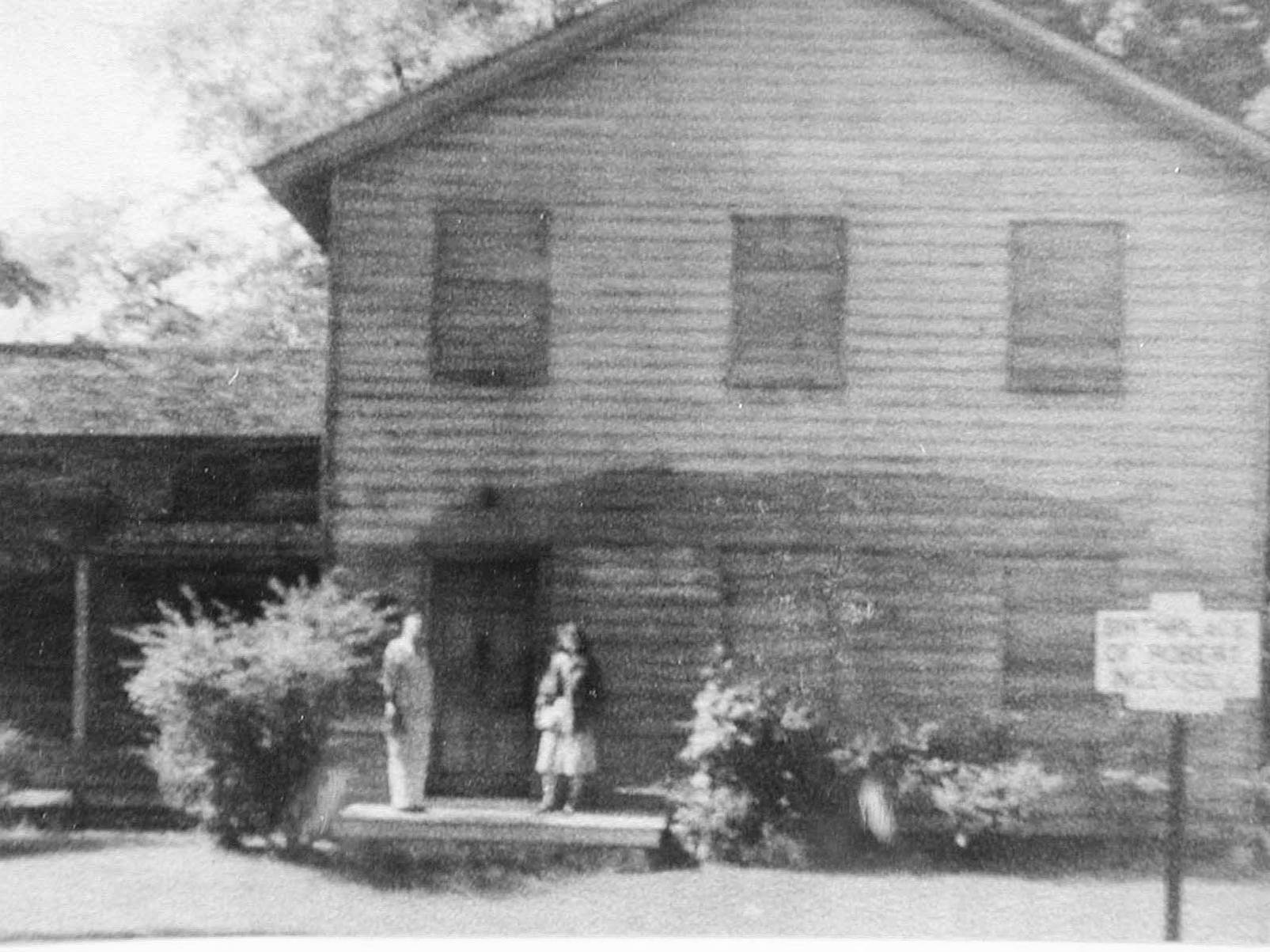
This undated photo from the early 1950s shows the Robert Green Ingersoll birthplace prior to its 1954 restoration by Lewis's organization. The man and woman are Arthur and Ruth Cromwell, husband-and-wife freethinkers from Rochester, New York, who served as Lewis's primary agents for much of the restoration work. Their daughter, Vashti McCollum, had been the plaintiff in McCollum v. Board of Education

== Bibliography ==
- The Tyranny of God (1921)
- Lincoln, the Freethinker (1925)
- Jefferson, the Freethinker (1925)
- The Bible Unmasked (1926)
- Franklin, the Freethinker (1926)
- Burbank, the Infidel (1929)
- Voltaire, the Incomparable Infidel (1929)
- Atheism, a collection of his public addresses (1930)
- The Bible and the Public Schools (1931)
- Should Children Receive Religious Instruction? (1933)
- The Ten Commandments (1946)
- Thomas Paine, Author of the Declaration of Independence (1947)
- In the Name of Humanity (1949)
- An Atheist Manifesto (1954)
- The Tragic Patriot (1954)
- Ingersoll, The Magnificent (1957)
