= Lucien H. Kerr =

American politician (1831–1873)

Member of the Illinois Senate from the 16th district
- In office 1870 – 1872
- Preceded by: New district
- Succeeded by: Redistricted

Personal details
- Born: May 4, 1831 London, Ohio
- Died: October 31, 1873 (aged 42) Peoria, Illinois
- Party: Republican
- Profession: Attorney

Lucien H. Kerr (May 4, 1831 – October 31, 1873) was an American politician and soldier from Ohio. Coming with his family to Peoria County, Illinois, Kerr studied law but enlisted in the Union Army before getting the chance to practice. He rose to lead the 11th Regiment Illinois Volunteer Cavalry until he was mustered out in 1864. Upon his return to Peoria, Kerr practiced law. He served one two-year term in the Illinois Senate, then was defeated in a re-election bid. He died the next year from an injury from a hunting accident.

== Biography ==
Lucien H. Kerr was born in London, Ohio, on May 4, 1831. The son of a prominent lawyer, Kerr studied at home and worked occasionally as a youth. He came with his family to a farm near Elmwood, Illinois. Kerr traded and shipped livestock in Elmwood, then moved to nearby Peoria to study law. Kerr was admitted to the bar around 1861, then almost immediately enlisted in the 11th Regiment Illinois Volunteer Cavalry of the Union Army. When the unit was deployed, Kerr was named its adjutant. He rose to the rank of major and lieutenant colonel, then assumed the full colonel when Col. Robert G. Ingersoll resigned after his capture. He was mustered out on December 19, 1864.

Upon his return to Peoria, Kerr practiced law. He made a public speech announcing his alignment with the Republican Party. In 1870, Kerr was elected to the Illinois Senate, where he served a two-year term. He was a candidate for re-election in 1872, but was unsuccessful. Kerr was appointed Peoria City Attorney, holding the position until his death.

In 1873, Kerr accidentally discharged his firearm while hunting, receiving a gunshot wound. An infection quickly spread and he died at the house of the Mayor of Peoria on October 31, 1873. He was buried at Springdale Cemetery in Peoria.
