= Eva Ingersoll Brown =

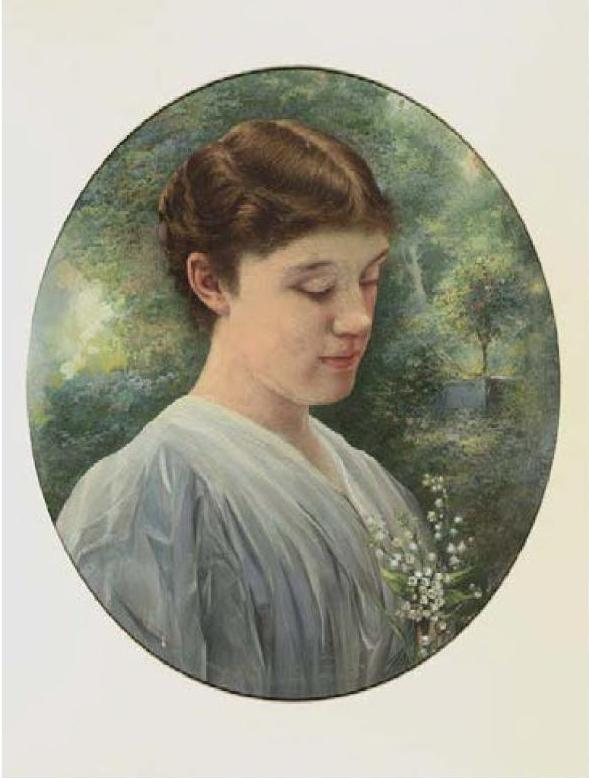
- Born: 22 September 1863
- Died: 28 August 1928 (aged 64)
- Children: Eva Ingersoll Brown Wakefield; Robert Ingersoll Brown
- Parent(s): Robert G. Ingersoll; Eva Parker Ingersoll
- Relatives: Maud Ingersoll Probasco (sister)

Eva Ingersoll Brown (22 September 1863 - 28 August 1928) was an American social worker, activist, and humanist. She was the daughter of lawyer and freethinker Robert G. Ingersoll and activist Eva Parker Ingersoll.

== Early life ==
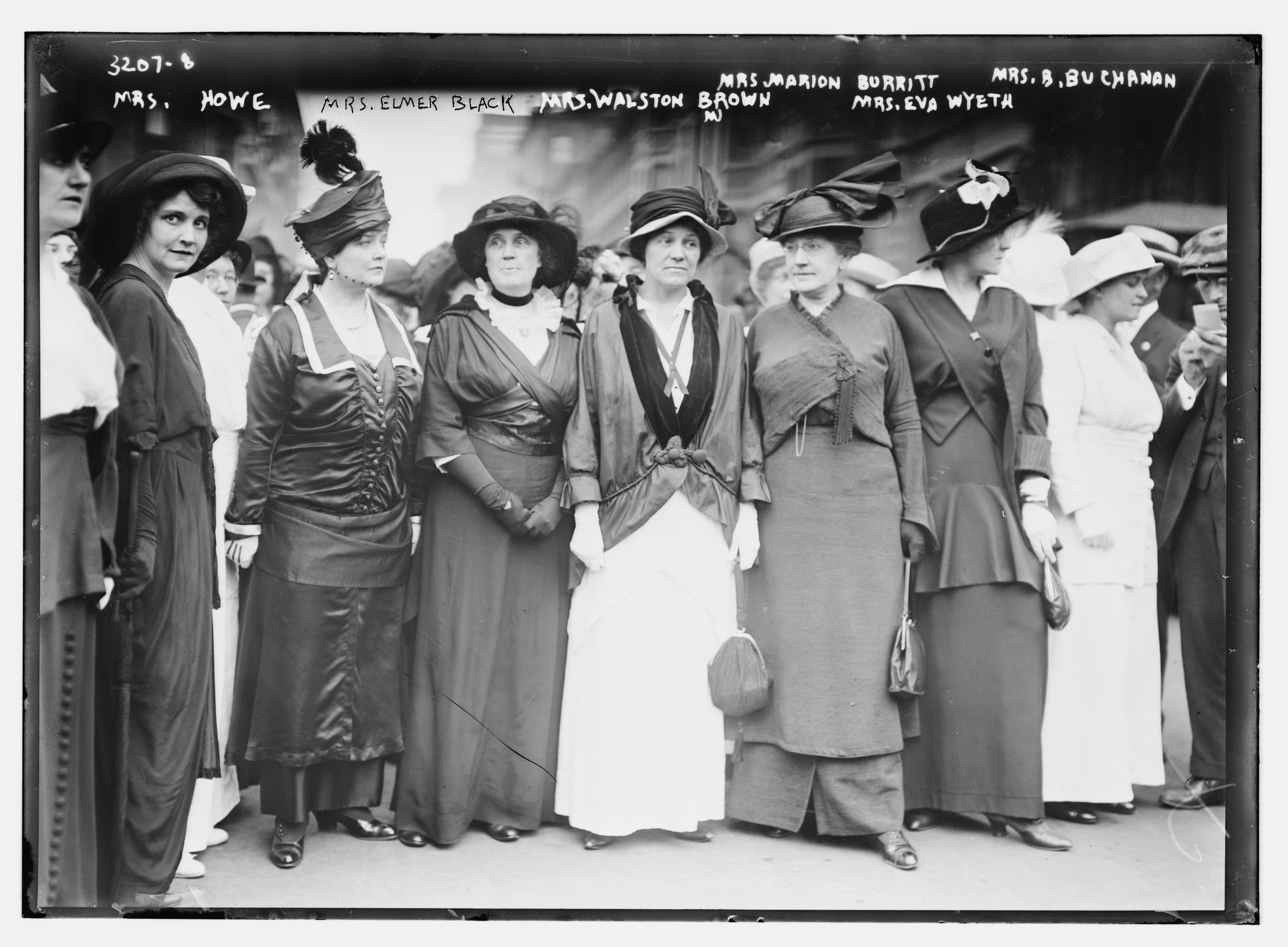
Eva Ingersoll-Brown (third from left) during a women's peace parade in New York City, 29 August 1914

Eva Ingersoll Brown was born 22 September 1863 in, the daughter of Robert Ingersoll and Eva Amelia Parker. Both were well-known activists and freethinkers. She was educated by private tutors.

She married the railwayman and financier Walston Hill Brown 13 November 1889 at 400 Fifth Avenue, New York City - the Ingersoll family home. According to their daughter, Eva Ingersoll Brown Wakefield:

At the time of Eva's marriage she made an unwritten agreement with her parents that she and her husband would live with the Ingersolls for one half of the year, and that the Ingersolls would live with the Browns for the balance of the time. This understanding was scrupulously adhered to until the death of Mrs. Ingersoll in 1923.

Walston Brown bought a country estate at Dobbs Ferry, New York as a gift for his new wife. Hamlin Garland, who visited the estate as the guest of Ingersoll Brown, described it as "a lovely estate with huge oaks, grassy slopes, clumps of vivid salvia, and glimpses of blue hills along the west bank of the Hudson River."

== Activism ==
Ingersoll-Brown became a prominent humanitarian and social worker in New York. She was President of the Child Welfare League, a member of the advisory board of the New York Peace Society, a member of the Consumers' League, the Women's Trade Union League, the National Child Labor Committee, the New York Child Labor Committee, the New York Society for the Prevention of Cruelty to Animals, the NAACP, and a number of other reformist organizations. Her younger sister, Maud Ingersoll Probasco, and mother, with whom she lived, were similarly active in social reform, and all four were "outspoken champions of the agnostic ideals of Colonel Ingersoll". Her daughter wrote that:

The two Evas and Maud were... women of vast public spirit, passionately concerned with the important issues of the day and of the age. Every movement for the betterment of humanity found in them eager and generous champions: birth control; child welfare; world peace; woman suffrage, and equality for women in all offices and relations of life; purified politics; slum clearance and model housing; prison reform; social justice; opposition to prejudice, injustice, and cruelty wherever found; intellectual liberty — all these they worked for with true Ingersollian enthusiasm, independence, and moral courage. As active members of the Audubon Society, the Society for the Prevention of Cruelty to Animals, and other humane organizations, they fought continuously for the rights of defenceless animals.

Eva and Maud founded the American Society for Humane Medical Research, an outgrowth of their work with the anti-vivisection movement.

Edwin Markham, Benjamin B. Lindsey and George Creel dedicated their 1914 book on child labor, Children in Bondage, to Ingersoll Brown: "Worker in Noble Causes, and President of The International Child Welfare League."
