= Robert Porter Caldwell =

American politician (1821–1885)

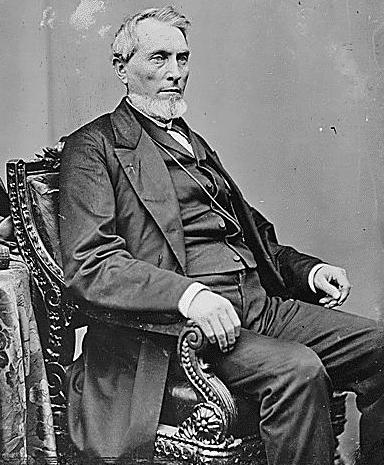

Member of the U.S. House of Representatives from Tennessee's 7th district
- In office March 4, 1871 – March 3, 1873
- Preceded by: Isaac R. Hawkins
- Succeeded by: John D. C. Atkins

Member of the Tennessee House of Representatives
- In office 1855-1856

Member of the Tennessee Senate
- In office 1847-1848

Personal details
- Born: December 16, 1821 Adair County, Kentucky, US
- Died: March 12, 1885 (aged 63) Trenton, Tennessee, US
- Party: Democratic
- Spouses: Harriett James Wilkins Caldwell; Anna E. Caldwell
- Children: Thomas Wilkins Caldwell

Robert Porter Caldwell (December 16, 1821 – March 12, 1885) was an American politician and a member of the United States House of Representatives for the 7th congressional district of Tennessee.

== Biography ==
Caldwell was born in Adair County, Kentucky, on December 16, 1821. He moved with his parents to Henry County, Tennessee, and a few years later moved to Obion County. He attended Cumberland University in Lebanon, Tennessee, and studied law at Troy.

Caldwell married Harriett James Wilkins who was born October 11, 1829, in Maury County, Tennessee, and died August 8, 1865. They were married on March 15, 1851, in Trenton. They had 5 children.

== Career ==
Admitted to the bar, Caldwell commenced practice in Trenton in 1845. He served in the Tennessee House of Representatives in 1847 and 1848. He was a member of the Tennessee Senate in 1855 and 1856. He was elected attorney general for the sixteenth judicial circuit of Tennessee in 1858.

During the Civil War, Caldwell was a major in the Twelfth Regiment, Tennessee Infantry, of the Confederate Army.

Caldwell was elected as a Democrat to the Forty-second Congress, but was not a successful candidate for re-election to the Forty-third Congress. He served from March 4, 1871, to March 3, 1873. He resumed the practice of law in Trenton, Tennessee.

== Death ==
Caldwell died in Trenton on March 12, 1885 (age 63 years, 86 days). He is interred at Oakland Cemetery, Trenton, Tennessee.

U.S. House of Representatives
Preceded by Isaac R. Hawkins	Member of the U.S. House of Representatives from Tennessee's 7th congressional district 1871-1873	Succeeded by John Atkins
