= Battle of Jackson, Tennessee =

Battle of the American Civil War

Coordinates: 35.6320°N 88.7635°W

- Part of American Civil War
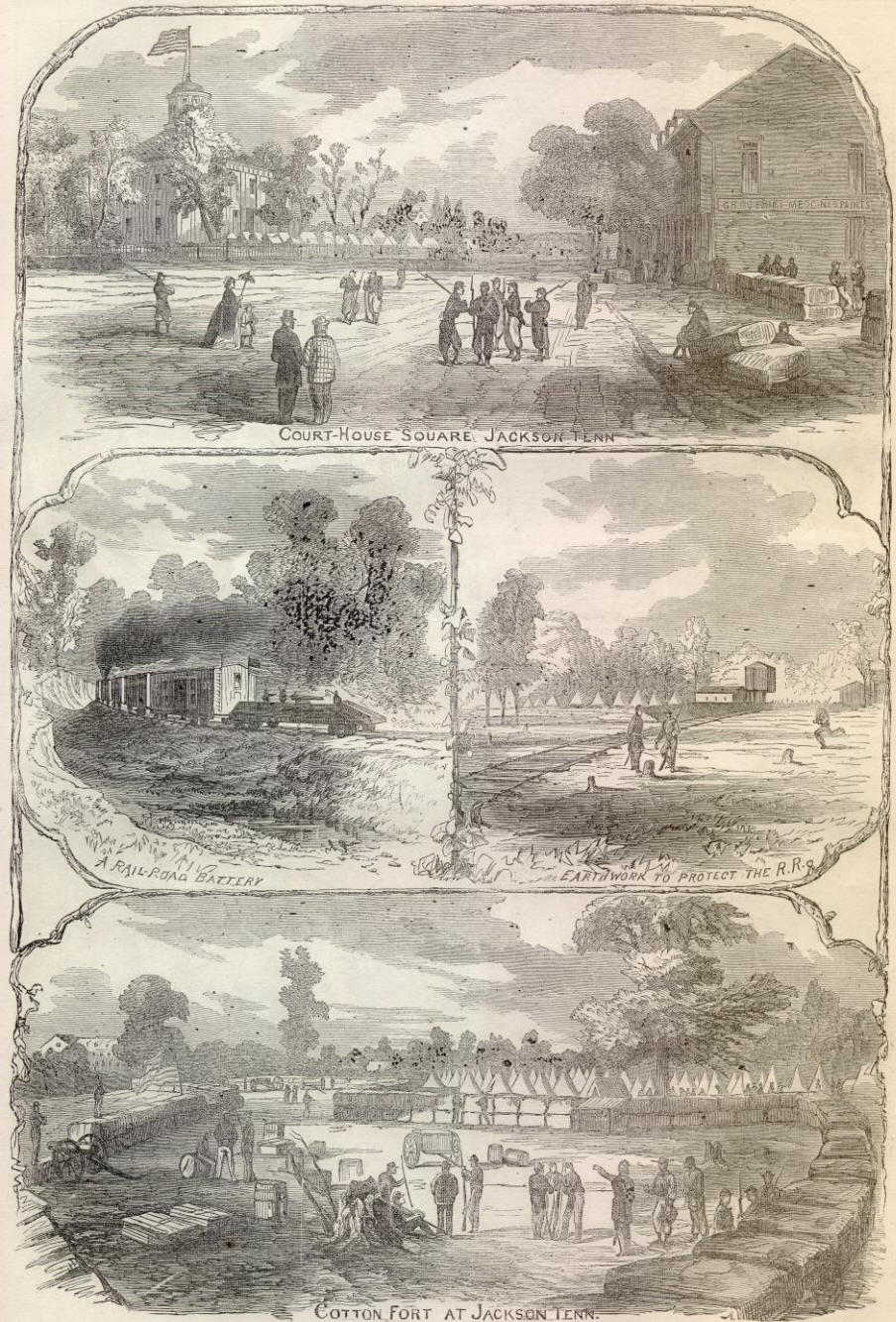
- Scenes from Jackson, done three months before the battle
Date	December 19, 1862
Location	Jackson, Tennessee
Result	Confederate victory

Belligerents
United States (Union)	Confederate States of America

Commanders and leaders
Adolph Englemann	Nathan Bedford Forrest

Units involved
Jackson garrison	Forrest's Cavalry Division

Strength
Unknown	400 cavalry

Casualties and losses
6	Unknown

The Battle of Jackson, also known as the Battle of Salem Cemetery, was fought on December 19, 1862, in Madison County, Tennessee, during the American Civil War.

== Background ==
The engagement at Jackson occurred during Confederate Brig. Gen. Nathan Bedford Forrest's Expedition into West Tennessee, between December 11, 1862, and January 1, 1863. Forrest wished to interrupt the rail supply line to Maj. Gen. Ulysses S. Grant's army, campaigning down the Mississippi Central Railroad. If he could destroy the Mobile & Ohio Railroad running south from Columbus, Kentucky, through Jackson, Tennessee, Grant would have to curtail or halt his operations. Forrest's 2,100-man cavalry brigade crossed the Tennessee River from December 15 to December 17, heading west. Grant ordered a troop concentration at Jackson under Brig. Gen. Jeremiah C. Sullivan and sent a cavalry force out under Col. Robert G. Ingersoll, to confront Forrest. Forrest, however, smashed the Union cavalry at Lexington on December 18.

== Battle ==
As Forrest continued his advance the next day, Sullivan ordered Col. Adolph Englemann to take a small force northeast of Jackson. At Old Salem Cemetery, acting on the defensive, Englemann's two infantry regiments repulsed a Confederate mounted attack and then withdrew a mile closer to town. To Forrest, the fight amounted to no more than a feint and show of force intended to hold Jackson's Union defenders in place while two mounted columns destroyed railroad track north and south of the town and returned. This accomplished, Forrest withdrew from the Jackson area to attack Trenton and Humboldt. Thus, although the Federals had checked a demonstration by a portion of Forrest's force, a major accomplishment, other Confederates had fulfilled an element of the expedition's mission.

== Rose Hill ==
Rose Hill is a large home built in 1823. During the Battle Of Jackson, Tennessee it was used as a hospital for both the injured Union and the Confederate soldiers. The house stands to this day and is currently a private residence.

== Battlefield preservation ==
The American Battlefield Trust and its partners have acquired and preserved 120 acres (49 ha) of the battlefield as of early 2024.
