= Freethinkers Society =

American organization

The Freethinkers of America
- Formation: 1915 as the Freethinkers Society of New York
- Founded at: New York City, New York, United States
- Type: Social group
- Purpose: Promoting freethought
- Headquarters: New York City, New York
- President: Joseph Lewis

The Freethinkers Society was an American organization founded as the Freethinkers' Society of New York in 1915. Later renamed, the society was behind a number of lawsuits seeking to ensure the separation of church and state.

== History ==
=== Founding of the organization ===
The society was founded in 1915. In January 1920, under the auspices of the Freethinkers' Society, Thomas Wright lectured in New York on Nietzsche and Thomas Paine in Manhattan.

The society was behind a number of lawsuits seeking to ensure the separation of church and state. In 1925, the society was suing Mount Vernon, New York, to stop school authorities from requiring children to attend religious services, with the case picked up as important by attorney Clarence Darrow. As of 1926, publisher Joseph Lewis remained president. After a court order favored their suit in early 1926, later that year, the society instituted injunction proceedings against the Board of Education of White Plains, New York over the decision of Supreme Court Justice Ellis J. Staley to allow time out for children's religious instruction. In May 1927, the Freethinkers' Society of New York took a decision on religious teaching to the Supreme Court on an appeal, after the court upheld the "religious training of public school children during schools hours at churches by parents."

=== Incorporation and renaming ===
In 1928, Lewis incorporated the Freethinkers Society, renaming it "The Freethinkers of America" and becoming its president.

In March 1930, at a luncheon honoring Philip J. Peabody, it was announced the society would move to legally force the board of education to eliminate the reading of the Bible in public schools. It was announced that Mayor Joseph Wheless, attorney for the association, would handle the case, with aid offered by Clarence Darrow, Arthur Garfield Hays and Stephen B. Vreeland.

As of November 1935, Freethinkers of America had 30,000 members at $1 a year for membership, with Lewis still president.

In 1936, Lewis denied that three honorary vice presidents had resigned, after the National Conference of Christians and Jews declared that Rupert Hughes, Clarence Darrow, and Harry Elmer Barnes had removed their names. Barnes confirmed he had argued with Lewis over Lewis' annual statement denouncing Yom Kippur, but had not resigned.

The society successfully challenged the use of public school buildings for religious training in 1948, with a decision by the Supreme Court despite protests by religious groups. In 1956, the organization sued to attempt to remove the "under god" from the Pledge of Allegiance, which had been added the year before. In 1958, the Freethinkers of America filed a suit over a hospital ban prohibiting birth-control therapy in New York city hospitals. Lewis died in 1968 after decades of activity with the organization.

== Members ==
Luther Burbank who was a member and first honorary vice president.

== See also ==
- Freethought
- Golden Age of Freethought
- Secularism
