= Diana Belais =

American animal rights activist

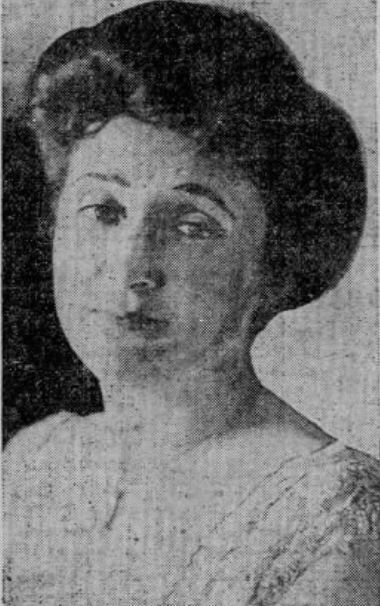
- Born: 1858
- Died: 1944 (aged 85–86); New York City
- Occupations: Animal rights and welfare activist
- Known for: Founder of the Anti-Vivisection Society of New York
- Spouse: David Belais

Diana Belais (1858–1944) was an American animal rights activist and anti-vivisectionist. She was the founder of the New York Anti-Vivisection Society.

== Career ==
As a young lady, Belais became interested in animal welfare by witnessing horses with large cargo loads slipping on the streets in severe winter conditions. She became an active member of the American Society for the Prevention of Cruelty to Animals.

Belais was the co-founder with her husband of the New York Humane Society in 1893. She was the founder of the New York Anti-Vivisection Society which was organized at a public meeting at Carnegie Hall in February 1908. Celebrities such as Minnie Maddern Fiske, Clara Morris and Emma Eames attended. Belais was president of the Anti-Vivisection Society of New York for thirty years.

In 1909, Belais and the New York Anti-Vivisection Society supported the Brough-Murray bill to prevent animal cruelty by allowing an "open door" measure so that doctors operating on animals must have an open door by their side in which inspectors appointed by the Board of Regents of the State University may walk in at any time. The bill was not successful. She pushed for another State regulation and supervision bill in 1910. In 1913, Belais protested against the Rockefeller Institute charging that Alexis Carrel was practicing cruel animal experiments at the institute. The New York Anti-Vivisection Society established a booth next to the Rockefeller Institute urging local citizens to rescue animals from the institute.

Belais wrote anti-vivisection articles in the Cosmopolitan magazine. She argued that animal experimentation was closely related to research exploitation of humans as in both cases the most vulnerable became subjects of experiments. She warned about the danger of clinical trials on children with tuberculin in Baltimore and New York.

Belais through the New York Anti-Vivisection Society hosted an annual event "Animal Hero Day" for heroic and intelligent dogs. Belias campaigned for legislation prohibiting the vivisection of dogs and in Albany testified at a hearing of an anti-vivisection bill. In 1912, Belais commented that "I wish people could realize that the anti-vivisection fight is the great moral question the hour... The growing spread of vivisection is teaching the young to be cruel, and when we have removed all feelings of humanity from the hearts of the children we have undermined all the ethical development we have attained.

In 1935, an election fight of the Society was taken to the supreme court by a defeated minority on charges that they were barred from election voting. Members were dissatisfied with how Belais was managing the Society as president. The Society dissolved in 1938 over an internal dispute.

Belais was director of the Medical Freedom League. She was editor of The Open Door magazine from 1895 to 1938, an animal welfare magazine.

== Personal life ==
Belais was a vegetarian for ethical reasons. She was married to David Belais (1863–1933) the inventor of white gold. Belais died at her home in New York City, aged 86. She was buried at Wellsburg, West Virginia. An obituary noted that "she could have led a life of ease, but she preferred to give her time and talents and money to trying to liberate the helpless, and virtually friendless, creatures, who could not speak for themselves".

== Selected publications ==
- "Why Vivisection?". Cosmopolitan. 56 (3): 649–653. 1914.
- "Why Does Christianity Permit Vivisection" (PDF). The Occultist. 1 (8): 14–15. 1928.

== Gallery ==
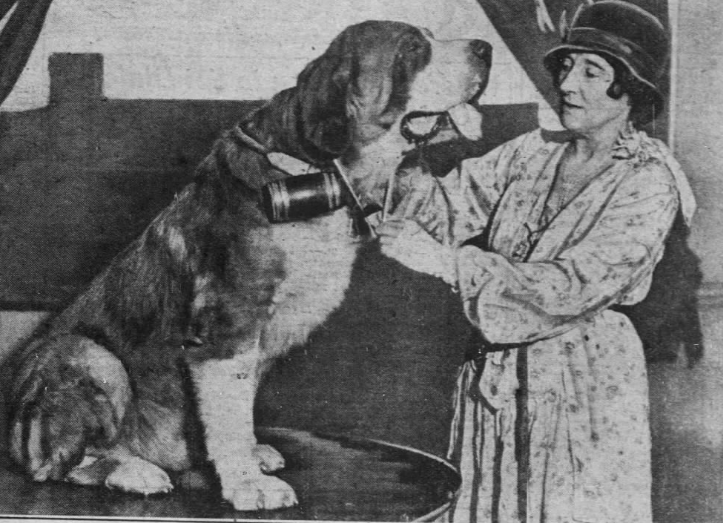
Belais in 1931 awarding a St. Bernard dog on Animal Hero Day

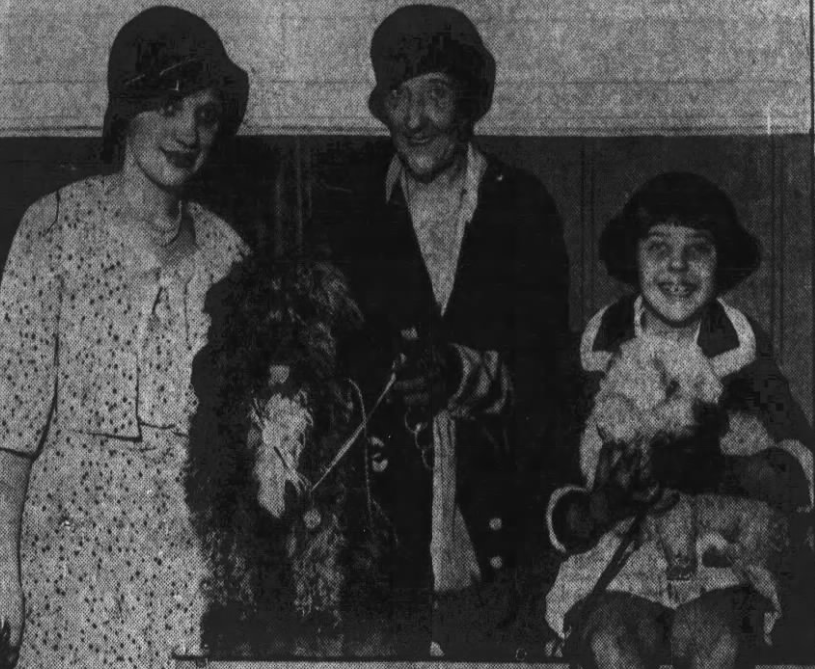
Belais (middle) in 1932 awarding hero dogs in New York
