= Isaac Roberts Hawkins =

American politician

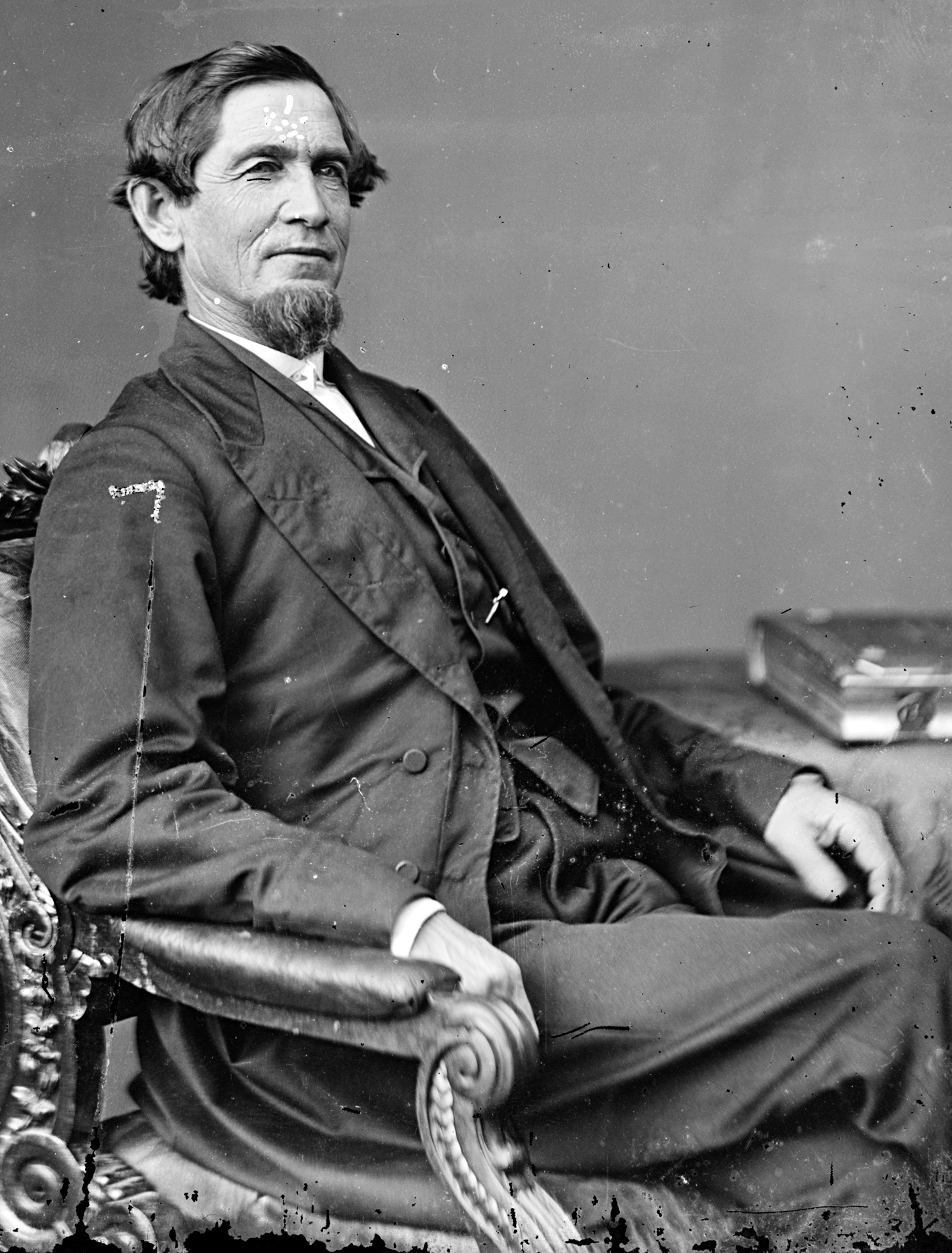

Member of the U.S. House of Representatives from Tennessee's 7th district
- In office July 24, 1866 – March 3, 1871
- Preceded by: John Vines Wright (1861) (Note: District inactive during the civil war)
- Succeeded by: Robert P. Caldwell

Personal details
- Born: May 16, 1818 Maury County, Tennessee, US
- Died: August 12, 1880 (aged 62) Huntingdon, Tennessee, US
- Party: Unconditional Union; Republican
- Spouse: Ellen Ott Hawkins
- Children: Eugene, Samuel

Military service
- Allegiance: (United States) Union
- Branch/service: United States Army; Union Army
- Years of service: 1862–1865
- Rank: Colonel; Bvt. Brigadier General
- Commands: 7th Tennessee Cavalry Regiment
- Battles/wars: Mexican–American War; American Civil War

Isaac Roberts Hawkins (May 16, 1818 – August 12, 1880) was an American soldier, politician and a member of the United States House of Representatives for Tennessee's 7th congressional district.

== Biography ==
Hawkins was born on May 16, 1818, near Columbia, Tennessee, in Maury County, to Samuel and Nancy Roberts Hawkins. Nancy was the daughter of Gen. Isaac Roberts and his wife Mary "Polly" Johnston Roberts and was the maternal granddaughter of Ann Robertson Johnston Cockrill, an early pioneer who was sister to James Robertson, a founder of Ft Nashborough (later Nashville). Samuel Hawkins' mother was Cassandra Roberts (Isaac Roberts' sister), which made Samuel and Nancy first cousins as well as spouses-not an uncommon practice at that time. Isaac moved with his parents to Carroll County in 1828 and attended the common schools. They lived on land that was part of a 1790 North Carolina land grant received by Gen. Roberts. Isaac engaged in agricultural pursuits, studied law, and was admitted to the bar in 1843. He commenced practice in Huntingdon, Tennessee, in Carroll County. He was married to Ellen Ott whose sister Justina married Isaac's first cousin Alvin, who later served as governor of Tennessee.

== Career ==
Having served as a lieutenant during the Mexican–American War, Hawkins then resumed the practice of law. A staunch Unionist, he was a delegate from Tennessee to a peace conference held in Washington, D.C., in 1861 in an effort to devise a means to prevent the impending war. He was elected to the convention for the consideration of Federal relations. He was judge of the circuit court in 1862. He entered the Union Army as lieutenant colonel of the 7th Tennessee Volunteer Cavalry in 1862. He was captured with his regiment at Union City, Tennessee, in 1864 and imprisoned. He was exchanged in August 1864 and resumed active service, being in command of the Cavalry force in western Kentucky until the close of the Civil War. He was commissioned by Governor William Gannaway Brownlow as one of the chancellors of Tennessee in 1865 but declined to qualify.

Upon the readmission of Tennessee to representation, Hawkins was elected as an Unconditional Unionist to the 39th Congress and re-elected as a Republican to the 40th and 41st, serving from December 4, 1865, to March 3, 1871. He was one of three and four (respectively) House Republicans to oppose the initial and final versions of the Fifteenth Amendment to the United States Constitution. He was a delegate to the 1868 Republican National Convention. During the Forty-first Congress, he was the chairman of the United States House Committee on Mileage.

== Death ==
Hawkins died in Huntingdon, Tennessee, on August 12, 1880 (age 62 years, 88 days). He is interred at the Hawkins family burial ground near Huntingdon.

== Notes ==
U.S. House of Representatives
Preceded by Civil War	Member of the U.S. House of Representatives from Tennessee's 7th congressional district 1866–1871	Succeeded by Robert P. Caldwell
