= Battle of Lexington, Tennessee =

Battle of the American Civil War

Battle of Lexington
- Part of American Civil War
Date	December 18, 1862
Location	Lexington, Tennessee
Result	Confederate victory

Belligerents
United States	Confederate States of America

Commanders and leaders
Robert G. Ingersoll	Nathan B. Forrest

Units involved
670	2,500

The Battle of Lexington in Tennessee was a small battle of the American Civil War, fought at Lexington, Tennessee on December 18, 1862, as part of General Nathan Bedford Forrest's cavalry raid into western Tennessee.

In late 1862, the main Union army in the west was in northern Mississippi. General Braxton Bragg sent General Forrest to raid into Tennessee against the Mobile and Ohio Railroad, which was a Union supply line. Forrest left Columbia, Tennessee, on December 11, 1862, and crossed the Tennessee River. On December 16, General Jeremiah Sullivan sent Colonel Robert G. Ingersoll from Jackson, Tennessee to Lexington. At Lexington, Ingersoll had 670 men (mostly raw recruits) and two 3-inch guns; part of his force was a contingent of cavalry under Col. Isaac Roberts Hawkins. Forrest had about 2,500 troopers.

As Forrest approached, Ingersoll ordered the destruction of a bridge across Beech Creek at Lower Road, and concentrated his forces along Old Stage Road, where he guessed that Forrest must attack. But the bridge across Beech Creek had not been destroyed, and Forrest crossed it, fell upon the flank of Ingersoll's command, and routed it. The Confederates captured Ingersoll, 140 men, both guns, and other equipment.

Forrest then moved to Jackson, Tennessee and fought there, then raided the railroad depot at Trenton, before moving to Union City and Clarksburg and withdrawing. Union forces attempted to cut off his withdrawal at the Battle of Parker's Cross Roads on December 31, 1862, but were not successful.
