= Joseph Wheless =

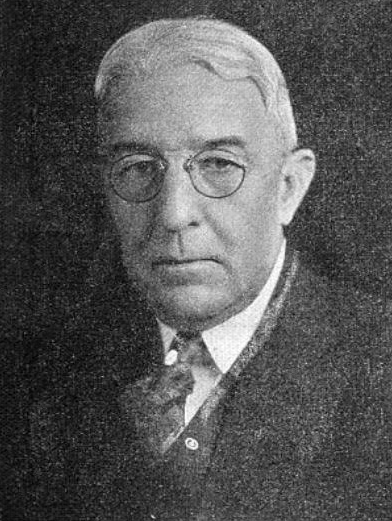
- Born: November 13, 1868; Nashville, Tennessee, US
- Died: September 19, 1950 (aged 81); New York, New York, US
- Burial place: Bellefontaine Cemetery
- Occupations: Lawyer, writer

Joseph Wheless (November 13, 1868 – September 19, 1950) was an American lawyer who wrote promoting the Jesus myth theory during the early years of the 20th century.

== Biography ==
Joseph Wheless was born in Nashville, Tennessee on November 13, 1868, son of Joseph Wheless Sr. (1830–1899), grandson of Aquilla Wheless. His mother Myra McCall, died when he was young, and his brothers and sisters were by his father's second wife. Wheless was raised Southern Methodist but later questioned the verity of the scriptures, studying their sources in detail. As a lawyer he defended American free-thinking and atheist organizations, was instructor in military jurisprudence at the University of Arkansas and held the rank of major in the department of the Judge Advocate General.

Also self-taught, Wheless was a successful lawyer and a very outspoken Jesus-was-a-myth writer. He studied for the bar while articled in his uncle's firm. Wheless served as counsel for several American free-thinking organizations and defended many cases involving issues of atheism. A specialist in South American law, he was also for some time an instructor in military jurisprudence at the University of Arkansas and a major in the Judge Advocate General's Department.

For his writing on religious topics, he received the honorary DD from the University of Denver. According to Wheless, not only had no one called Jesus ever lived, but Christianity and the Bible are based on deliberate fraud; Christianity's continued existence is a conspiracy using persecution and oppression to perpetuate itself, to enslave people.

He died at St. Luke's Hospital in New York on September 19, 1950, and was buried at Bellefontaine Cemetery in St. Louis.

== Works ==
- Compendium of the Laws of Mexico – Volume 1, Volume 2 (1910)
- Is it God's Word (1926)
- Debunking the Law of Moses (1929)
- Forgery in Christianity (1930)
