= Robert G. Ingersoll =

American agnostic, lawyer, politician and orator (1833–1899)

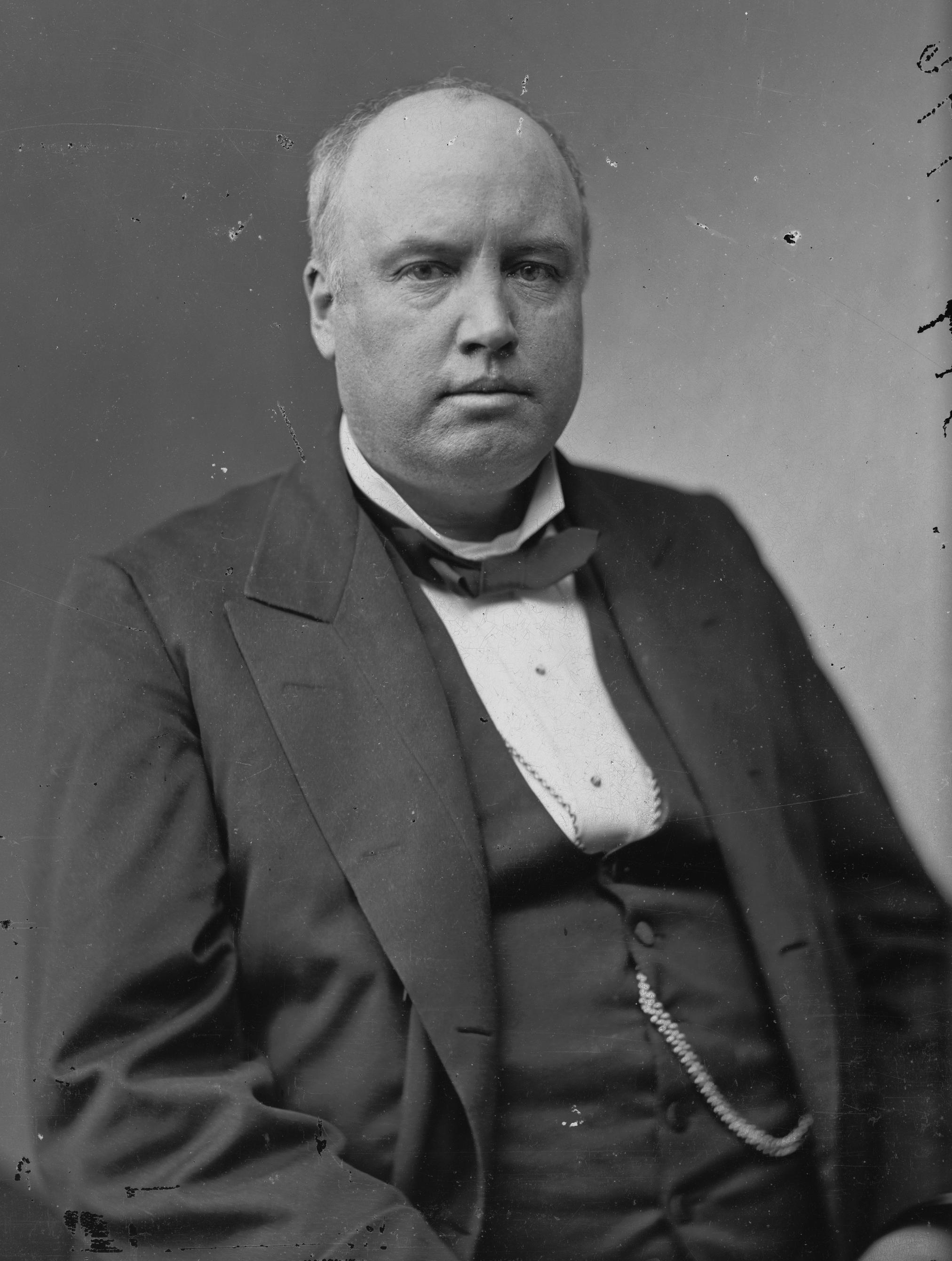
- Ingersoll c. 1865–80

16th Attorney General of Illinois
- In office 1867–1869
- Preceded by: David B. Campbell (1848)
- Succeeded by: Washington Bushnell

Personal details
- Born: Robert Green Ingersoll; August 11, 1833 Dresden, New York, U.S.
- Died: July 21, 1899 (aged 65) Dobbs Ferry, New York, U.S.
- Resting place: Arlington National Cemetery
- Party: Republican
- Spouse: Eva Parker Ingersoll
- Children: Eva Ingersoll Brown; Maud Ingersoll Probasco
- Relatives: Ebon Clarke Ingersoll (brother); Eva Ingersoll Wakefield (granddaughter)
- Occupation: Politician, orator, lecturer
- Writing career
- Period: 19th century
- Genres: Satire, essay, social commentary, political commentary, philosophical literature, biblical criticism
- Subjects: Freethought, agnosticism, humanism, abolitionism, women's rights

Robert Green Ingersoll (/ˈɪŋɡərˌsɔːl, -ˌsɒl, -səl/; August 11, 1833 – July 21, 1899), nicknamed "the Great Agnostic", was an American lawyer, writer, and orator during the Golden Age of Free Thought, who campaigned in defense of agnosticism.

== Personal life ==
Robert Ingersoll was born in Dresden, New York. His father, John Ingersoll, was an abolitionist-sympathizing Congregationalist preacher, whose radical opinions caused him and his family to relocate frequently. For a time, Rev. John Ingersoll substituted as preacher for American revivalist Charles G. Finney while Finney was on a tour of Europe. Upon Finney's return, Rev. Ingersoll remained for a few months as co-pastor/associate pastor with Finney. The elder Ingersoll's later pastoral experiences influenced young Robert negatively, however, as The Elmira Telegram described in 1890:

Though for many years the most noted of American infidels, Colonel Ingersoll was born and reared in a devoutly Christian household. His father, John Ingersoll, was a Congregationalist minister and a man of mark in his time, a deep thinker, a logical and eloquent speaker, broad minded and generously tolerant of the views of others. The popular impression which credits Ingersoll's infidelity in the main to his father's severe orthodoxy and the austere and gloomy surroundings in which his boyhood was spent is wholly wrong. On the contrary, the elder Ingersoll's liberal views were a source of constant trouble between him and his parishioners. They caused him to frequently change his charges, and several times made him the defendant in church trials. His ministerial career was, in fact, substantially brought to a close by a church trial which occurred while he was pastor of the Congregational Church at Madison, Ohio, and at which his third wife appeared as the prosecutor. Upon this occasion, he was charged with prevarication and unministerial conduct. The evidence adduced – the trial is one of the abiding traditions of the dull little town of Madison – was of the most trivial and ridiculous character, but the committee which heard it decided that, though he had done "nothing inconsistent with his Christian character," he was "inconsistent with his ministerial character," and forbade him to preach in the future. Elder John went before the higher church authorities and was permitted to continue his clerical labors. However, he soon removed to Wisconsin, going from there to Illinois, where he died. The Madison trial occurred when young Robert was nine years old, and it was the unjust and bigoted treatment his father received which made him the enemy, first of Calvinism, and later of Christianity in its other forms.

During 1853, "Bob" Ingersoll taught a term of school in Metropolis, Illinois, where he let one of his students, the future Judge Angus M. L. McBane, do the "greater part of the teaching, while Latin and history occupied his own attention". At some time prior to his Metropolis position, Ingersoll had also taught school in Mount Vernon, Illinois.

Ingersoll was married, February 13, 1862, to Eva Amelia Parker (1841–1923). They had two daughters. The elder daughter, Eva Ingersoll-Brown, was a renowned feminist and suffragist.

== Lawyer ==
Later in 1853, the family settled in Marion, Illinois, where Robert and his brother Ebon Clarke Ingersoll were admitted to the bar in 1854. A county historian writing 22 years later noted that local residents considered the Ingersolls as a "very intellectual family; but, being Abolitionists, and the boys being deists, rendered obnoxious to our people in that respect."

While in Marion, he learned law from Judge Willis Allen and served as deputy clerk for John M. Cunningham, Williamson County's County Clerk and Circuit Clerk. In 1855, after Cunningham was named registrar for the federal land office in southeastern Illinois at Shawneetown, Illinois, Ingersoll followed him to the riverfront city along the Ohio River. After a brief time there, he accepted the deputy clerk position with John E. Hall, the county clerk and circuit clerk of Gallatin County, and also a son-in-law of John Hart Crenshaw. On November 11, 1856, Ingersoll caught Hall in his arms when the son of a political opponent assassinated his employer in their office.

When he relocated to Shawneetown, he continued to read law with Judge William G. Bowman who had a large library of both law and the classics. In addition to his job as a clerk, he and his brother began their law practice using the name "E.C. and R.G. Ingersoll". During this time they also had an office in Raleigh, Illinois, then the county seat of neighboring Saline County. As attorneys following the court circuit he often practiced alongside Cunningham's soon-to-be son-in-law, John A. Logan, the state's attorney and political ally to Hall.

With his earlier mentor Cunningham having moved back to Marion after the land office's closing in 1856, and Logan's relocation to Benton, Illinois, after his marriage that autumn, Ingersoll and his brother moved to Peoria, Illinois, where they finally settled in 1857.

Ingersoll was involved with several major trials as an attorney, notably the Star Route trials, a major political scandal in which his clients were acquitted. He also defended a New Jersey man charged with blasphemy. Although he did not win the acquittal, his vigorous defense is considered to have discredited blasphemy laws and few other prosecutions followed.

For a time, Ingersoll represented con artist James Reavis, the "Baron of Arizona", pronouncing his Peralta Land Grant claim valid.

== Civil war ==
With the beginning of the American Civil War, he raised the 11th Regiment Illinois Volunteer Cavalry of the Union Army and assumed command. The regiment fought in the Battle of Shiloh. Ingersoll was later captured in a skirmish with the Confederates near Lexington, Tennessee on December 18, 1862, then paroled – i.e. released on his oath that he would not fight again against the Confederate States of America until formally exchanged for a captured Confederate soldier or officer of like rank (who was often under parole himself, making the practice a matter of honor and formality, which could be extended to individuals or even entire regiments en masse). This was an old practice which was still commonly observed early in the war, until the Dix–Hill Cartel broke down under political distress. Unable to perform his duties under his officer's commission while paroled, he tendered his resignation as commanding officer on June 30, 1863.

== Entry into politics ==
After the war, he served as Illinois Attorney General. He was a prominent member of the Republican Party and, though he never held elected office, he was nonetheless an active participant in politics. According to Robert Nisbet, Ingersoll was a "staunch Republican." His speech nominating James G. Blaine for the 1876 presidential election was unsuccessful, as Rutherford B. Hayes received the Republican nomination, but the speech itself, known as the "Plumed Knight" speech, was considered a model of political oratory. His opinions on slavery, woman's suffrage, and other issues of the time would sometimes become part of the mainstream, but his atheism/agnosticism effectively prevented him from ever pursuing or holding political offices higher than that of state attorney general. Illinois Republicans tried to persuade him to campaign for governor on the condition that Ingersoll conceal his agnosticism during the campaign, which he refused to do.

== Oratory and free thought ==
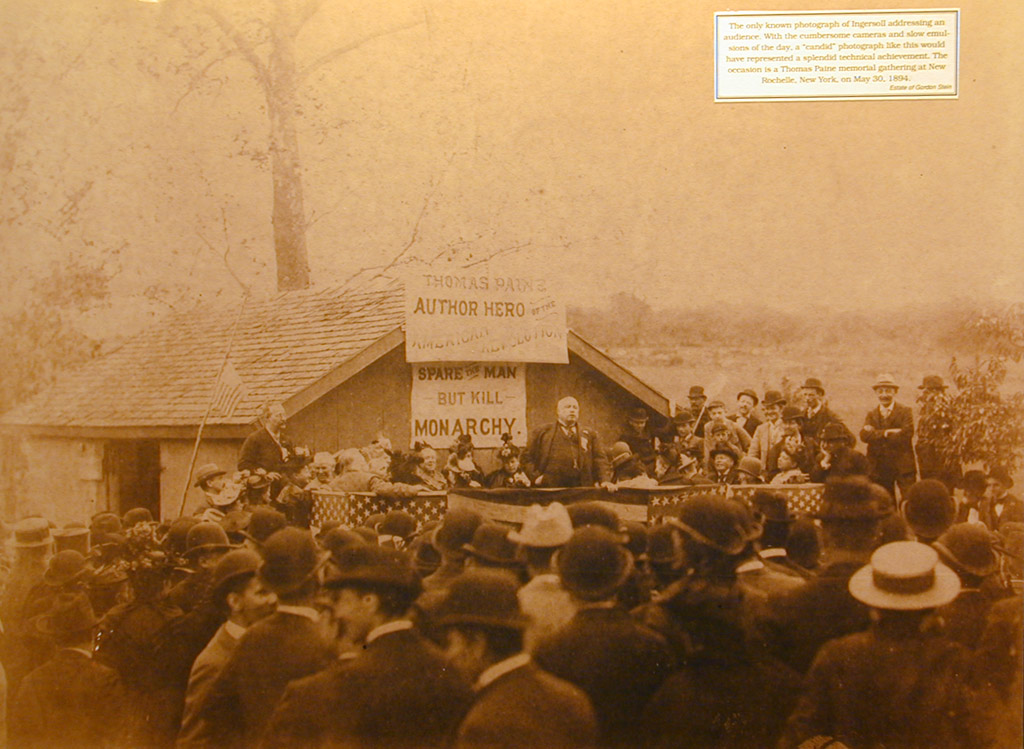
The only known image of Ingersoll addressing an audience.

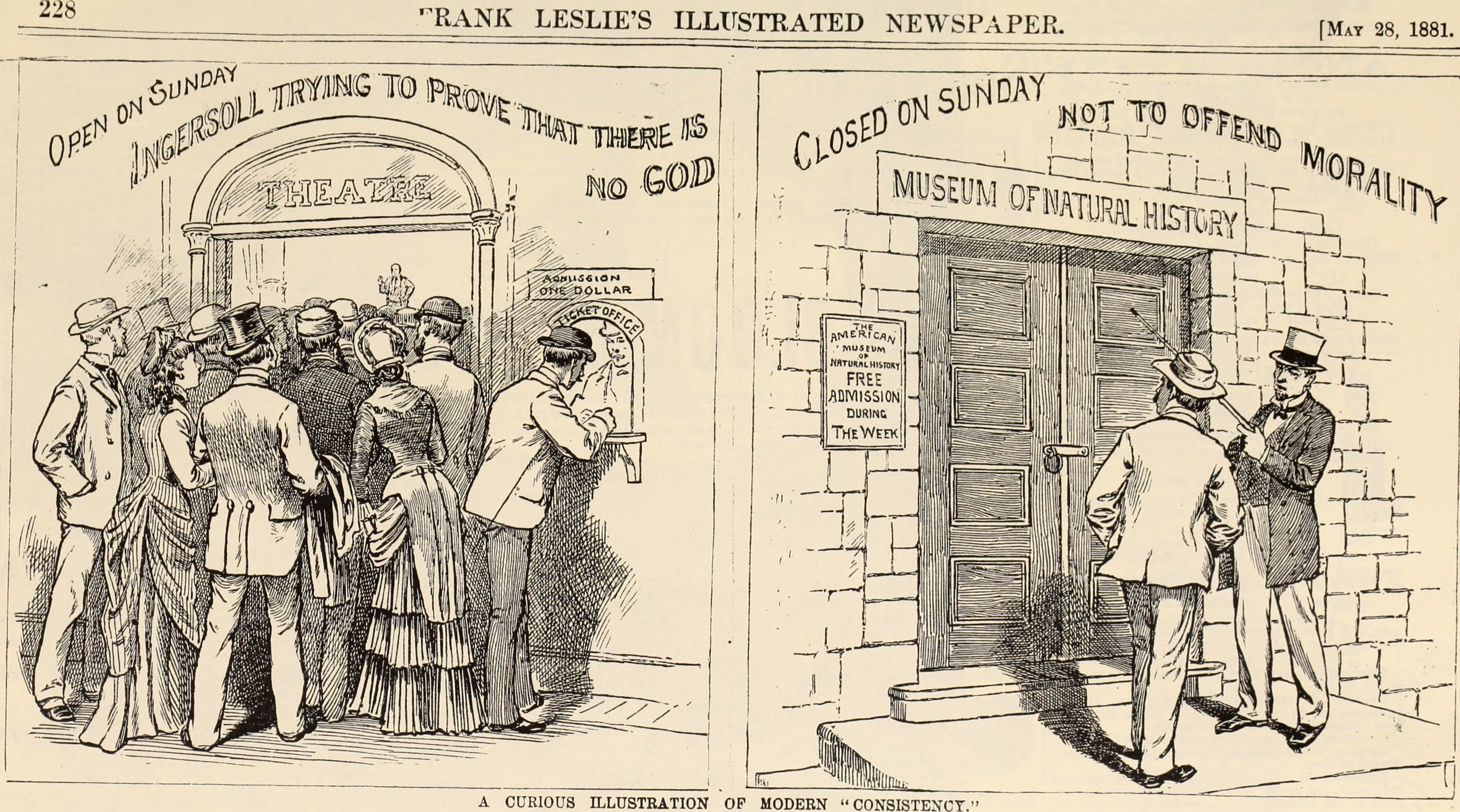
A political cartoon depicting crowds seeking entertainment by flocking to hear Ingersoll advocate for agnosticism in a theater which is open on Sunday, when the American Museum of Natural History is closed so as "Not to Offend Morality".

On October 30, 1880, Ingersoll was introduced as "the Great Agnostic" by Rev. Henry Ward Beecher, before a political speech delivered to a large audience at the Academy of Music in Brooklyn. He was ironically referred to as "Pope Bob" as early as 1879 by the Chicago Times. In an unpublished 1881 lecture entitled "The Great Infidels", he attacked the doctrine of Hell: "All the meanness, all the revenge, all the selfishness, all the cruelty, all the hatred, all the infamy of which the heart of man is capable, grew, blossomed, and bore fruit in this one word – Hell." He opposed the Chinese Exclusion Act and supported a more lenient policy toward Chinese workers coming to the United States. Ingersoll defended women’s rights and opposed racial discrimination and capital punishment.

== Membership of The Lambs ==
Ingersoll was elected to The Lambs Theatre Club in 1889 and gave an address to their first public "gambol" at the Broadway Theatre on March 3, 1891; his address "brought many laughs".

== Death ==
Ingersoll died from congestive heart failure at the age of 65. Soon after his death, his brother-in-law, Clinton P. Farrell, collected copies of Ingersoll's speeches for publication. The 12-volume Dresden Editions kept interest in Ingersoll's ideas alive and preserved his speeches for future generations. Ingersoll's ashes are interred in Arlington National Cemetery.

== Legacy ==
Susan Jacoby credits Ingersoll for the revival of Thomas Paine's reputation in American intellectual history, which had decreased after the publication of The Age of Reason published during 1794–95. Paine postulated that men, not God, had written the Bible, and Ingersoll included this work in his lectures on freethinking. As the only freethinker of his time with a wide audience outside of the unbelieving circle, he reintroduced Paine's ideas to a new generation.

In 2005, a popular edition of Ingersoll's work was published by Steerforth Press. Edited by the Pulitzer Prize-winning music critic Tim Page, What's God Got to Do With It: Robert Ingersoll on Free Speech, Honest Talk and the Separation of Church and State brought Ingersoll's thinking to a new audience.

In his capacity as the Illinois Attorney General, Ingersoll's name is carved on the cornerstone of the Illinois State Capitol.

== Friendship with Walt Whitman ==
Ingersoll enjoyed a friendship with the poet Walt Whitman, who considered Ingersoll the greatest orator of his time. "It should not be surprising that I am drawn to Ingersoll, for he is 'Leaves of Grass' ... He lives, embodies, the individuality, I preach. I see in Bob [Ingersoll] the noblest specimen – American-flavored – pure out of the soil, spreading, giving, demanding light."

The feeling was mutual. Upon Whitman's death in 1892, Ingersoll delivered the eulogy at the poet's funeral. The eulogy was published to great acclaim and is considered a classic panegyric.

== In popular culture ==
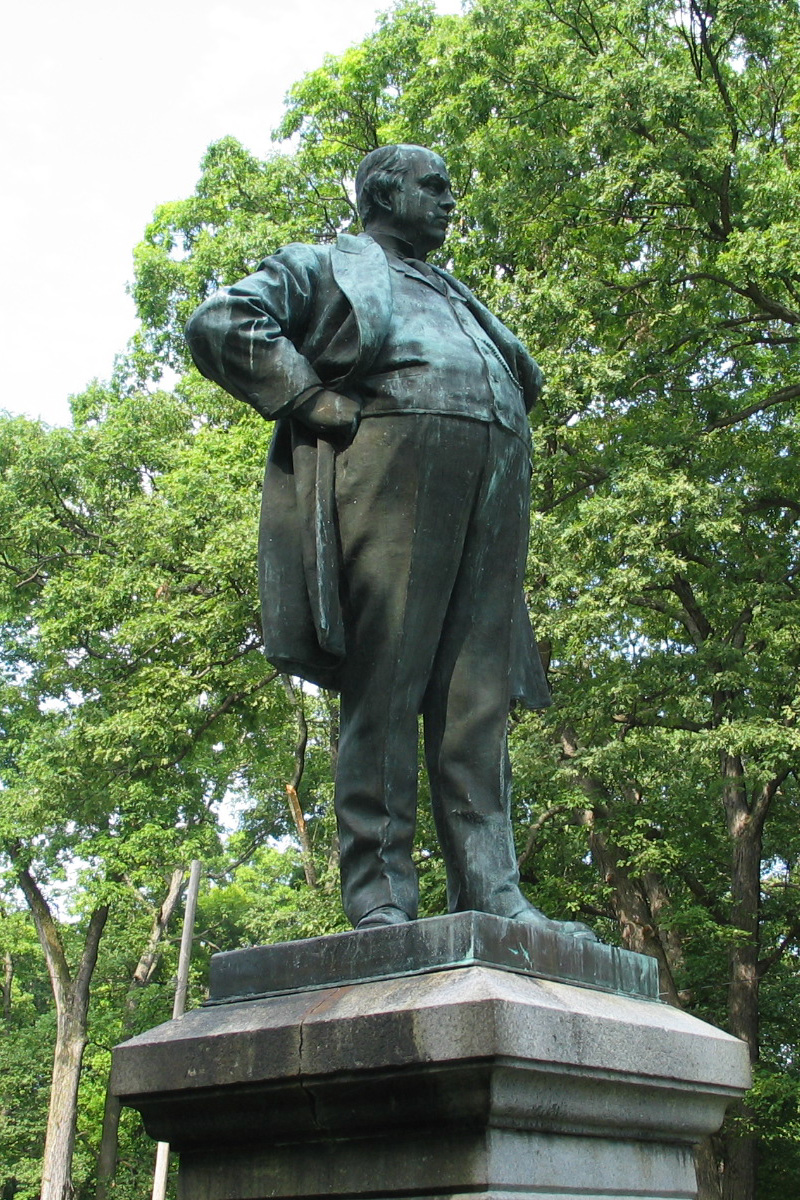
Ingersoll statue in Peoria, Illinois.

- In the novel In the Beauty of the Lilies by John Updike, The character Clarence Wimot is convinced to leave his faith primarily as a result of a passage from an Ingersoll text pertaining to cruelty in the Old Testament.
- The community of Redwater, Texas was founded in the mid-1870s as Ingersoll in honor of Robert Ingersoll; it was changed to its current name following an 1886 revival meeting that yielded 110 conversions, the townspeople no longer wishing to honor the agnostic.
- The Ingersoll Gender Center in Seattle WA is named after him.
- Colonel Bob Mountain in Washington state was named for Robert Ingersoll.
- His birthplace, known as the Robert Ingersoll Birthplace, or Robert Green Ingersoll Birthplace Museum, was listed on the National Register of Historic Places in 1988.
- A mine near Keystone, SD is named after him.
- Ingersoll's type of agnosticism was labelled Ingersollism by his intellectual contemporaries, including Congregationalist Lyman Abbott, Congregationalist minister John P. Sanderson, Illinois scholar and lawyer George Reuben Wendling and others (such as a collection of refutations of Ingersollism published in 1879 by Chicago publishers Rhodes and McClure).
- In July 2016 Ingersoll's statue in Peoria, Illinois was restored thanks to a successful fundraising effort by the Freedom From Religion Foundation.
- In Lewis Grassic Gibbon's modernist novel Sunset Song (1932), the character of Long Rob reads "the books of a coarse creature Ingersoll that made watches and didn't believe in God" and "God knows if the creature's logic was as poor as his watches" and "fair caution him and his Ingersoll that could neither make watches nor sense". The author's running joke intentionally confuses Robert G. Ingersoll with the watch-making company of the same name.
- In Sinclair Lewis's novel Elmer Gantry, the "freethinker" Jim Lefferts throws a volume of Ingersoll's work at Gantry following an argument over his recent conversion; Gantry, struggling to write a speech for a revival meeting, takes a paragraph from Ingersoll out of context and builds his sermon on it.
- Magician Penn Jillette has created characters named Bobby Ingersoll in his 2022 book Random and his 2025 book Felony Juggler: A Novel.

== Works ==
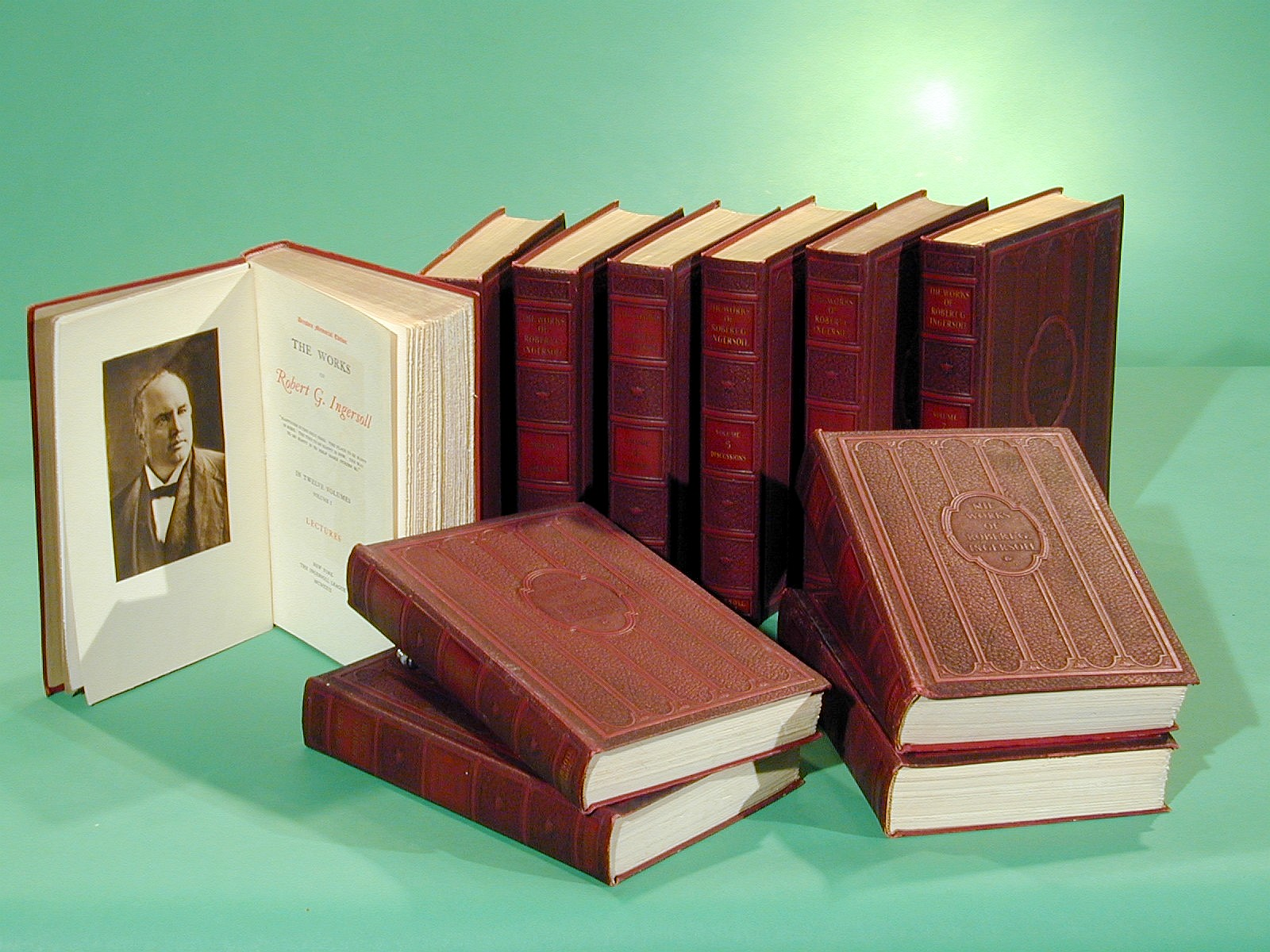
Ingersoll’s collected works in the Robert Green Ingersoll Birthplace Museum.

- The gods and other lectures (New York: D. M. Bennett, 1874)
- Some mistakes of Moses (Washington, D.C. : C. P. Farrell, 1879)
- Proceedings of the Civil Rights Mass-Meeting held at Lincoln Hall, October 22, 1883. Speeches of Hon. Frederick Douglass and Robert G. Ingersoll. (Washington, D. C.: C. P. Farrell, 1883)
- Walt Whitman (New York, The Truth Seeker Co, 1890)
- Col. Ingersoll's reply to his critics in the N.Y. "Evening Telegram." (Toronto: J. Spencer Ellis, 1892)
- Shakespeare, a lecture (New York, Farrell, 1895)
- Abraham Lincoln, a lecture (New York, Farrell, 1895)
- Voltaire, a lecture (New York, Farrell, 1895)
- Great speeches of Col. R. G. Ingersoll; complete (Chicago: Rhodes & McClure, 1895)
- "Why I Am an Agnostic" (1896)
- The works of Robert G. Ingersoll vols. 1, 2, 3, 4, 5, 6, 7, 8, 9, 10, 11, and 12 (New York: The Dresden pub. co., C. P. Farrell, 1900)

== Footnotes ==
Legal offices
Preceded by office abolished	Attorney General of Illinois; 1867–1869	Succeeded by Washington Bushnell
