= Freethought =

Position that beliefs should be formed only on the basis of logic, reason, and empiricism

Freethought (sometimes spelled free thought) is a social movement espousing unorthodox attitudes and beliefs, formed independently from authority, tradition, revelation, or dogma.

The cognitive application of free thought is known as freethinking, and adherents of freethought are known as freethinkers, which the Collins English Dictionary defines as someone "mentally free from the conventional bonds of tradition or dogma, and thinks independently." In some contemporary thought in particular, free thought is strongly tied with rejection of traditional social or religious belief systems. Freethinkers hold that knowledge should be grounded in facts, scientific inquiry, and logic. The skeptical application of science implies freedom from the intellectually limiting effects of confirmation bias, cognitive bias, conventional wisdom, popular culture, prejudice, or sectarianism.

The term first came into use in the 17th century in order to refer to people who inquired into the basis of traditional beliefs which were often accepted unquestioningly. Today, freethinking is most closely linked with agnosticism, deism, secularism, humanism, anti-clericalism, and religious critique.

== Definition ==
Atheist author Adam Lee defines freethought as thinking which is independent of revelation, tradition, established belief, and authority, and considers it as a "broader umbrella" than atheism "that embraces a rainbow of unorthodoxy, religious dissent, skepticism, and unconventional thinking."

The basic summarizing statement of the essay The Ethics of Belief by the 19th-century British mathematician and philosopher William Kingdon Clifford is: "It is wrong always, everywhere, and for anyone, to believe anything upon insufficient evidence." The essay became a rallying cry for freethinkers when published in the 1870s, and has been described as a point when freethinkers grabbed the moral high ground. Clifford was himself an organizer of freethought gatherings, the driving force behind the Congress of Liberal Thinkers held in 1878.

Regarding religion, freethinkers typically hold that there is insufficient evidence to support the existence of supernatural phenomena. According to the Freedom from Religion Foundation, "No one can be a freethinker who demands conformity to a bible, creed, or messiah. To the freethinker, revelation and faith are invalid, and orthodoxy is no guarantee of truth." and "Freethinkers are convinced that religious claims have not withstood the tests of reason. Not only is there nothing to be gained by believing an untruth, but there is everything to lose when we sacrifice the indispensable tool of reason on the altar of superstition. Most freethinkers consider religion to be not only untrue, but harmful."

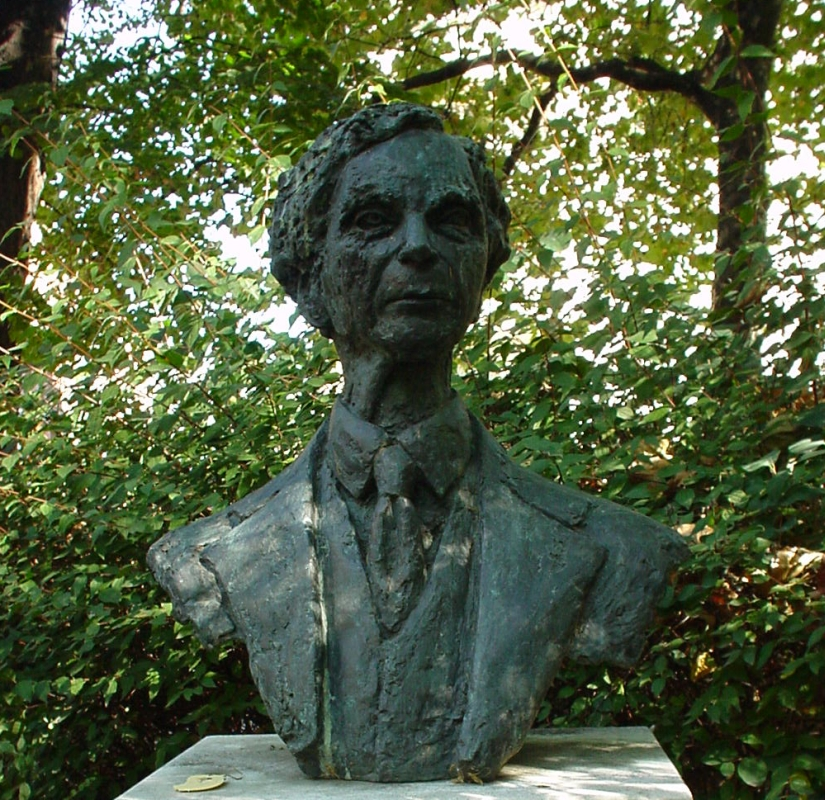
Bust of Bertrand Russell in London

Philosopher Bertrand Russell wrote in his 1944 essay The Value of Free Thought that someone is considered a freethinker only if their beliefs are supported by evidence rather than bias, regardless of how odd their conclusions may seem. According to Russell, a freethinker is not necessarily an atheist or an agnostic, as long as they are free from the "force of tradition" and the "tyranny of [their] own passions".

Fred Edwords, former executive of the American Humanist Association, suggests that by Russell's definition, liberal religionists who have challenged established orthodoxies can be considered freethinkers.

On the other hand, according to Bertrand Russell, atheists and/or agnostics are not necessarily freethinkers. As an example, he mentions Stalin, whom he compares to a "pope":

what I am concerned with is the doctrine of the modern Communistic Party, and of the Russian Government to which it owes allegiance. According to this doctrine, the world develops on the lines of a Plan called Dialectical Materialism, first discovered by Karl Marx, embodied in the practice of a great state by Lenin, and now expounded from day to day by a Church of which Stalin is the Pope. […] Free discussion is to be prevented wherever the power to do so exists; […] If this doctrine and this organization prevail, free inquiry will become as impossible as it was in the middle ages, and the world will relapse into bigotry and obscurantism.

In the 18th and 19th century, many thinkers regarded as freethinkers were deists, arguing that the nature of God can only be known from a study of nature rather than from religious revelation. In the 18th century, "deism" was as much of a 'dirty word' as "atheism", and deists were often stigmatized as either atheists or at least as freethinkers by their Christian opponents. Deists today regard themselves as freethinkers, but are now arguably less prominent in the freethought movement than atheists.

== Characteristics ==
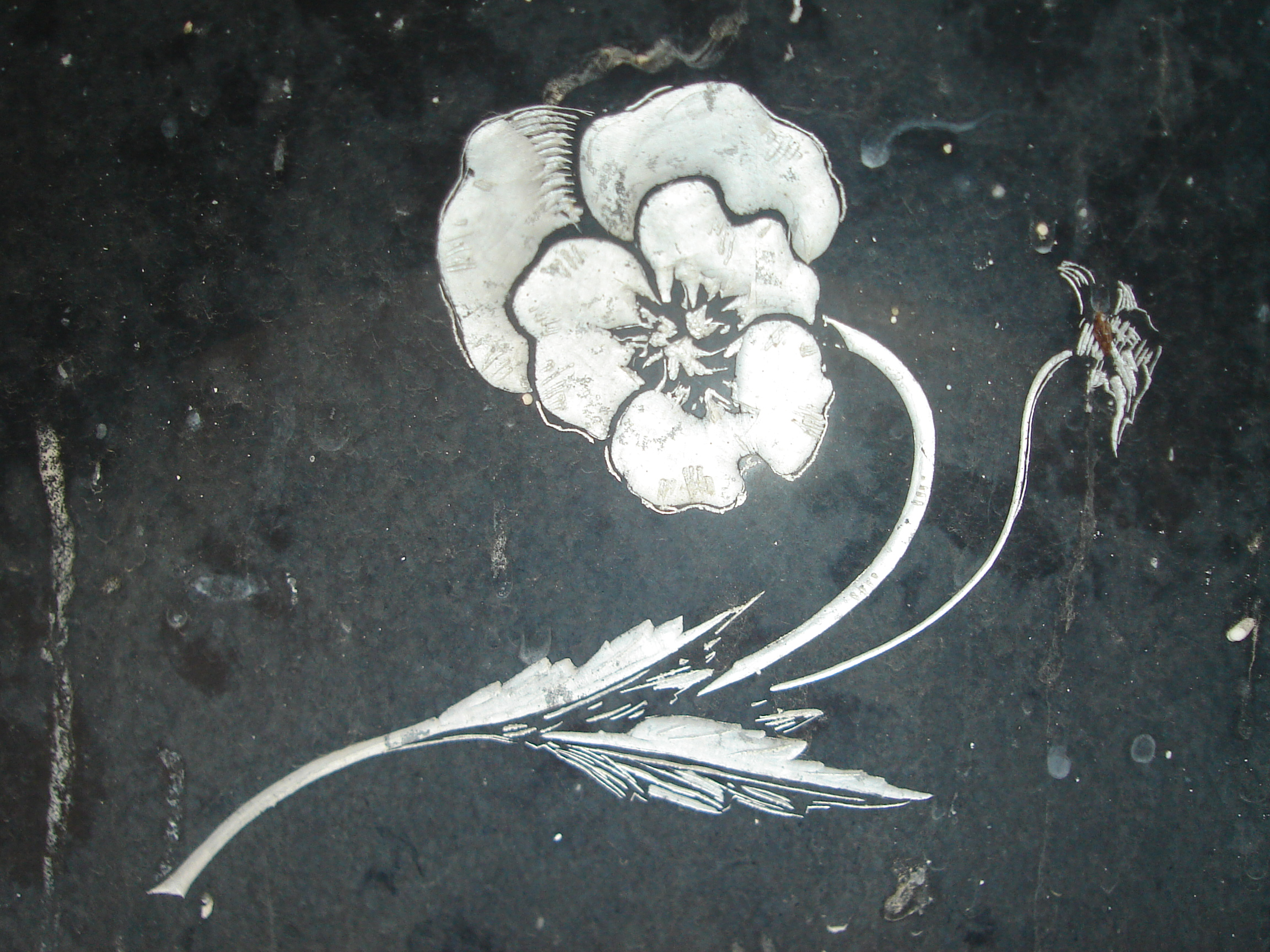
Tombstone detail of a freethinker, late 19th century (Cemetery of Cullera, Spain)

Among freethinkers, for a notion to be considered true it must be testable, verifiable, and logical. Many freethinkers tend to be humanists, who base morality on human needs and would find meaning in human compassion, social progress, art, personal happiness, love, and the furtherance of knowledge. Generally, freethinkers like to think for themselves, tend to be skeptical, respect critical thinking and reason, remain open to new concepts, and are sometimes proud of their own individuality. They would determine truth for themselves – based upon knowledge they gain, answers they receive, experiences they have and the balance they thus acquire. Freethinkers reject conformity for the sake of conformity, whereby they create their own beliefs by considering the way the world around them works and would possess the intellectual integrity and courage to think outside of accepted norms, which may or may not lead them to believe in some higher power.

== Symbol ==
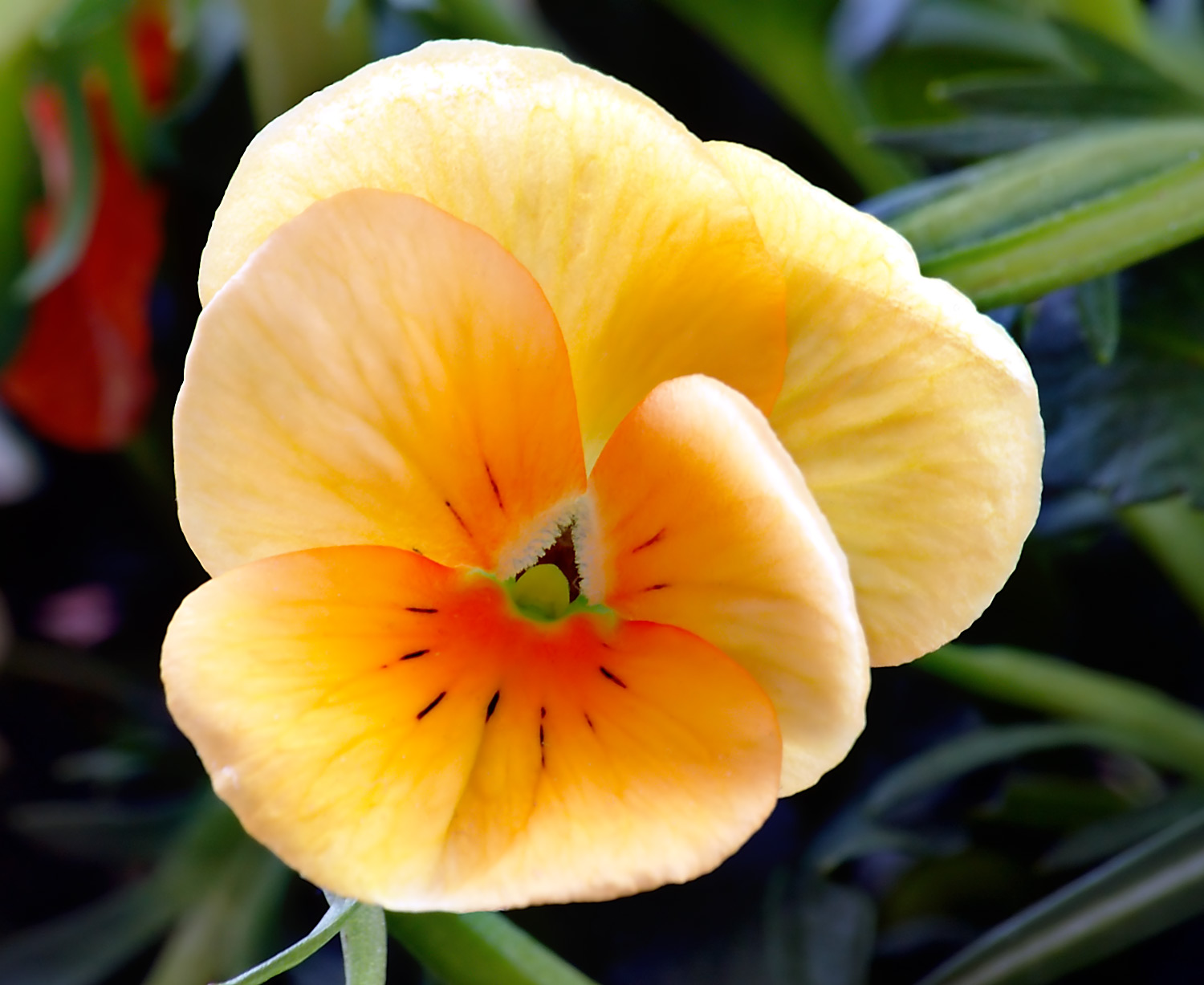
Pansy is a symbol of freethought.

The pansy serves as the long-established and enduring symbol of freethought; literature of the American Secular Union inaugurated its usage in the late 1800s. The reasoning behind the pansy as the symbol of freethought lies both in the flower's name and in its appearance. The pansy derives its name from the French word pensée, which means "thought". It allegedly received this name because the flower is perceived by some to bear resemblance to a human face, and in mid-to-late summer it nods forward as if deep in thought. In the 1880s, following examples set by freethinkers in France, Belgium, Spain and Sweden, it was proposed in the United States as "the symbol of religious liberty and freedom of conscience".

== History ==
Modern freethinkers, despite their pronounced rejection of tradition, consider several historical movements, developments and individuals as pre-modern precursors, such as critical thought in Ancient Greece, repositories of knowledge and wisdom in Ireland and in the Iranian civilizations (for example in the era of Khayyam (1048–1131) and his unorthodox Sufi Rubaiyat poems). Later societies made advances on freedom of thought such as the Chinese (note for example the seafaring renaissance of the Southern Song dynasty of 1127–1279), on through heretical thinkers on esoteric alchemy or astrology, to the Renaissance and the Protestant Reformation pioneered by Martin Luther.

French physician Rabelais (died 1553) celebrated "rabelaisian" freedom as well as good feasting and drinking (an expression and a symbol of freedom of the mind) in defiance of the hypocrisies of conformist orthodoxy in his utopian Thelema Abbey (from θέλημα: free "will"), the device of which was Do What Thou Wilt:

So had Gargantua established it. In all their rule and strictest tie of their order there was but this one clause to be observed, Do What Thou Wilt; because free people ... act virtuously and avoid vice. They call this honor.

When Rabelais's hero Pantagruel journeys to the "Oracle of The Div(in)e Bottle", he learns the lesson of life in one simple word: "Trinch!", Drink! Enjoy the simple life, learn wisdom and knowledge, as a free human. Beyond puns, irony, and satire, Gargantua's prologue-metaphor instructs the reader to "break the bone and suck out the substance-full marrow" ("la substantifique moëlle"), the core of wisdom.

Modern freethinkers also consider the execution of pantheistic writer and former Dominican friar Giordano Bruno by the Inquisition in 1600 a landmark.

=== Australia ===
Prior to World War II, Australia had high rates of Protestantism and Catholicism. Post-war Australia has become a highly secularised country. Donald Horne, one of Australia's well-known public intellectuals, believed rising prosperity in post-war Australia influenced the decline in church-going and general lack of interest in religion. "Churches no longer matter very much to most Australians. If there is a happy eternal life it's for everyone ... For many Australians the pleasures of this life are sufficiently satisfying that religion offers nothing of great appeal", said Horne in his landmark work The Lucky Country (1964).

=== Canada ===
In 1873, a handful of secularists founded the earliest known secular organization in English Canada, the Toronto Freethought Association. Reorganized in 1877 and again in 1881, when it was renamed the Toronto Secular Society, the group formed the nucleus of the Canadian Secular Union, established in 1884 to bring together freethinkers from across the country.

A significant number of the early members appear to have come from the educated labour "aristocracy", including Alfred F. Jury, J. Ick Evans and J. I. Livingstone, all of whom were leading labour activists and secularists. The second president of the Toronto association, T. Phillips Thompson, became a central figure in the city's labour and social-reform movements during the 1880s and 1890s and arguably Canada's foremost late nineteenth-century labour intellectual. By the early 1880s scattered freehought organizations operated throughout southern Ontario and parts of Quebec, eliciting both urban and rural support.

The principal organ of the freethought movement in Canada was Secular Thought (Toronto, 1887–1911). Founded and edited during its first several years by English freethinker Charles Watts (1835–1906), it came under the editorship of Toronto printer and publisher James Spencer Ellis in 1891 when Watts returned to England. In 1968 the Humanist Association of Canada (HAC) formed to serve as an umbrella group for humanists, atheists, and freethinkers, and to champion social justice issues and oppose religious influence on public policy—most notably in the fight to make access to abortion free and legal in Canada.

=== France ===
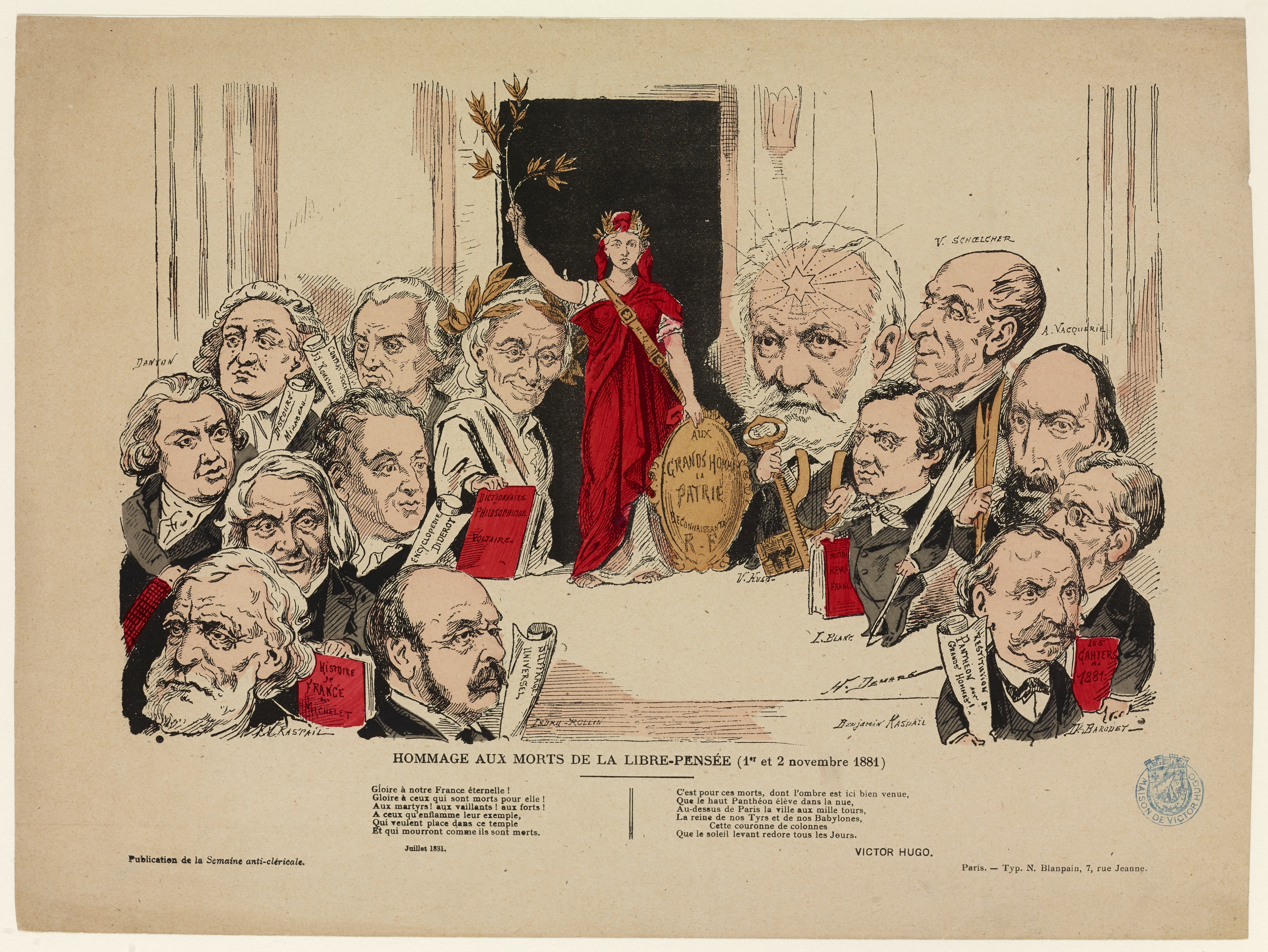
Hommage aux morts de la Libre-pensée, 1881

In France, the concept first appeared in publication in 1765 when Denis Diderot, Jean le Rond d'Alembert, and Voltaire included an article on Liberté de penser in their Encyclopédie. The concept of freethought spread so widely that even places as remote as the Jotunheimen, in Norway, had well-known freethinkers such as Jo Gjende by the 19th century.

François-Jean Lefebvre de la Barre (1745–1766) was a young French nobleman, famous for having been tortured and beheaded before his body was burnt on a pyre along with Voltaire's Philosophical Dictionary. La Barre is often said to have been executed for not saluting a Roman Catholic religious procession, but the elements of the case were far more complex.

In France, Lefebvre de la Barre is widely regarded a symbol of the victims of Christian religious intolerance; La Barre along with Jean Calas and Pierre-Paul Sirven, was championed by Voltaire. A second replacement statue to de la Barre stands nearby the Basilica of the Sacred Heart of Jesus of Paris at the summit of the butte Montmartre (itself named from the Temple of Mars), the highest point in Paris and an 18th arrondissement street nearby the Sacré-Cœur is also named after Lefebvre de la Barre.

The 19th century saw the emergence of a specific notion of Libre-Pensée ("freethought"), with writer Victor Hugo as one of its major early proponents. French Freethinkers (Libre-Penseurs) associate freedom of thought, political anti-clericalism and socialist leanings. The main organisation referring to this tradition to this day is the Fédération nationale de la libre pensée, created in 1890.

=== Germany ===
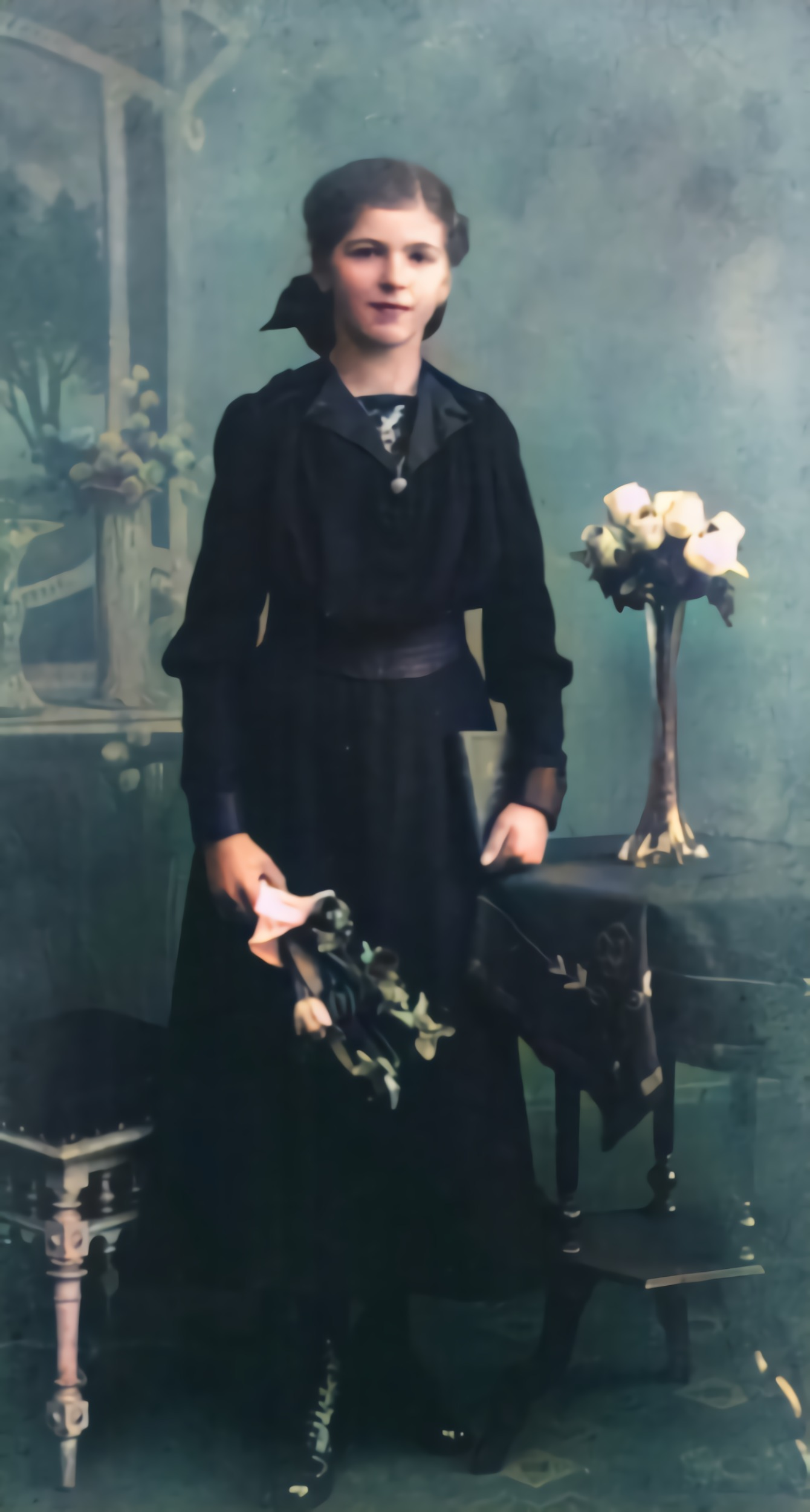
Jugendweihe is a German coming of age ceremony. Photograph from early 20th century.

In Germany, during the period 1815–1848 and before the March Revolution, the resistance of citizens against the dogma of the church increased. In 1844, under the influence of Johannes Ronge and Robert Blum, belief in the rights of man, tolerance among men, and humanism grew, and by 1859 they had established the Bund Freireligiöser Gemeinden Deutschlands (literally Union of Free Religious Communities of Germany), an association of persons who consider themselves to be religious without adhering to any established and institutionalized church or sacerdotal cult. This union still exists today, and is included as a member in the umbrella organization of free humanists. In 1881 in Frankfurt am Main, Ludwig Büchner established the Deutscher Freidenkerbund (German Freethinkers League) as the first German organization for atheists and agnostics. In 1892 the Freidenker-Gesellschaft and in 1906 the Deutscher Monistenbund were formed.

Freethought organizations developed the "Jugendweihe" (literally Youth consecration), a secular "confirmation" ceremony, and atheist funeral rites. The Union of Freethinkers for Cremation was founded in 1905, and the Central Union of German Proletariat Freethinker in 1908. The two groups merged in 1927, becoming the German Freethinking Association in 1930.

More "bourgeois" organizations declined after World War I, and "proletarian" freethought groups proliferated, becoming an organization of socialist parties. European socialist freethought groups formed the International of Proletarian Freethinkers (IPF) in 1925. Activists agitated for Germans to disaffiliate from their respective Church and for secularization of elementary schools; between 1919–1921 and 1930–1932 more than 2.5 million Germans, for the most part supporters of the Social Democratic and Communist parties, gave up church membership. Conflict developed between radical forces including the Soviet League of the Militant Godless and Social Democratic forces in Western Europe led by Theodor Hartwig and Max Sievers. In 1930 the Soviet and allied delegations, following a walk-out, took over the IPF and excluded the former leaders. Following Hitler's rise to power in 1933, most freethought organizations were banned, though some right-wing groups that worked with so-called Völkische Bünde (literally "ethnic" associations with nationalist, xenophobic and very often racist ideology) were tolerated by the Nazis until the mid-1930s.

=== Ireland ===
In the 19th century, received opinion was scandalized by George Ensor (1769–1843). His Review of the Miracles, Prophecies, & Mysteries of the Old and New Testaments (1835) argued that, far from being a source of moral teaching, revealed religion and its divines regarded questions of morality as "incidental"--as a "mundane and merely philosophical" topic.

=== Netherlands ===
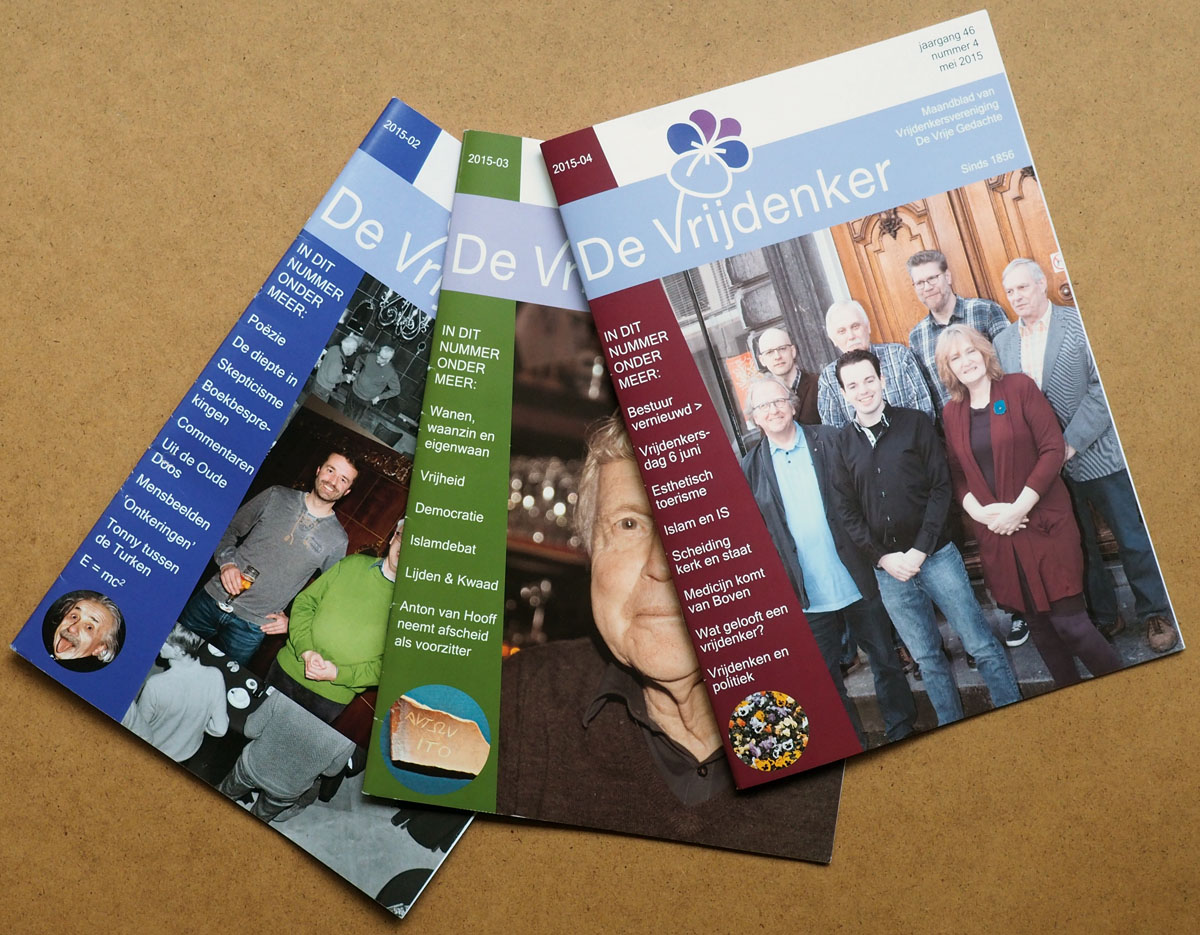
The Dutch magazine De Vrijdenker (The Freethinker) 2015

In the Netherlands, freethought has existed in organized form since the establishment of De Dageraad (now known as De Vrije Gedachte) in 1856. Among its most notable subscribing 19th century individuals were Johannes van Vloten, Multatuli, Adriaan Gerhard and Domela Nieuwenhuis.

In 2009, Frans van Dongen established the Atheist-Secular Party, which takes a considerably restrictive view of religion and public religious expressions.

Since the 19th century, freethought in the Netherlands has become more well known as a political phenomenon through at least three currents: liberal freethinking, conservative freethinking, and classical freethinking. In other words, parties which identify as freethinking tend to favor non-doctrinal, rational approaches to their preferred ideologies, and arose as secular alternatives to both clerically aligned parties as well as labor-aligned parties. Common themes among freethinking political parties are "freedom", "liberty", and "individualism".

=== Switzerland ===
With the introduction of cantonal church taxes in the 1870s, anti-clericals began to organise themselves. Around 1870, a "freethinkers club" was founded in Zürich. During the debate on the Zürich church law in 1883, professor Friedrich Salomon Vögelin and city council member Kunz proposed to separate church and state.

=== Turkey ===
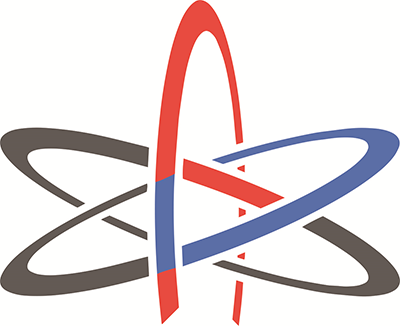
Logo of Atheism Association of Turkey

In the last years of the Ottoman Empire, freethought made its voice heard by the works of distinguished people such as Ahmet Rıza, Tevfik Fikret, Abdullah Cevdet, Kılıçzade Hakkı, and Celal Nuri İleri. These intellectuals affected the early period of the Turkish Republic. Mustafa Kemal Atatürk –field marshal, revolutionary statesman, author, and founder of the secular Turkish nation state, serving as its first President from 1923 until his death in 1938– was the practitioner of their ideas. He made many reforms that modernized the country. Sources point out that Atatürk was a religious skeptic and a freethinker. He was a non-doctrinaire deist or an atheist, who was antireligious and anti-Islamic in general. According to Atatürk, the Turkish people do not know what Islam really is and do not read the Quran. People are influenced by Arabic sentences that they do not understand, and because of their customs they go to mosques. When the Turks read the Quran and think about it, they will leave Islam. Atatürk described Islam as the religion of the Arabs in his own work titled Vatandaş için Medeni Bilgiler by his own critical and nationalist views.

Association of Atheism (Ateizm Derneği), the first official atheist organisation in Middle East and Caucasus, was founded in 2014. It serves to support irreligious people and freethinkers in Turkey who are discriminated against based on their views. In 2018 it was reported in some media outlets that the Ateizm Derneği would close down because of the pressure on its members and attacks by pro-government media, but the association itself issued a clarification that this was not the case and that it was still active.

=== United Kingdom ===
The term freethinker emerged towards the end of the 17th century in England to describe those who stood in opposition to the institution of the Church, and the literal belief in the Bible. The beliefs of these individuals were centered on the concept that people could understand the world through consideration of nature. Such positions were formally documented for the first time in 1697 by William Molyneux in a widely publicized letter to John Locke, and more extensively in 1713, when Anthony Collins wrote his Discourse of Free-thinking, which gained substantial popularity. This essay attacks the clergy of all churches and it is a plea for deism.

The Freethinker magazine was first published in Britain in 1881; it continued in print until 2014, and still exists as a web-based publication.

=== United States ===
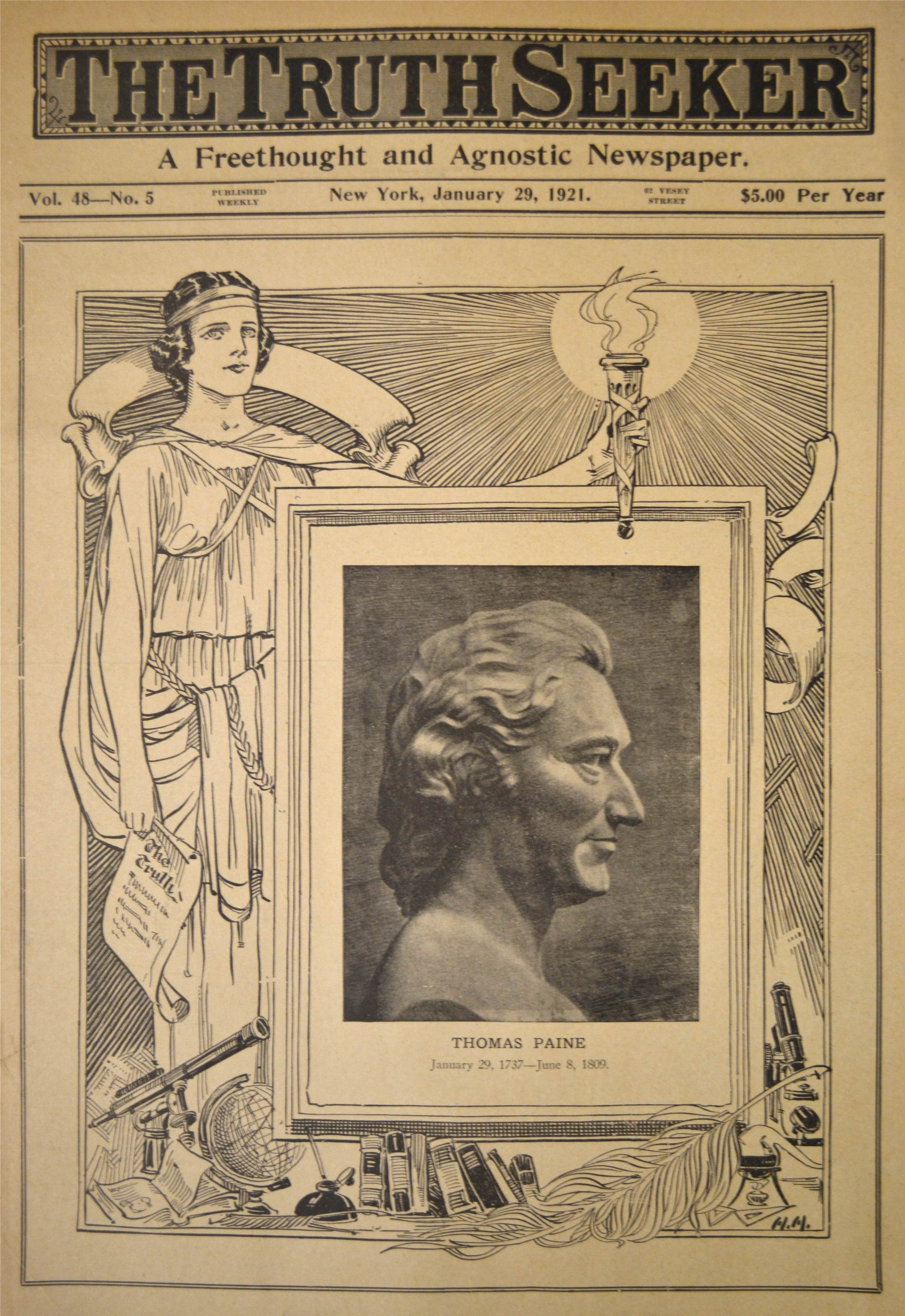
Cover of The Truth Seeker from 1921 with picture of Thomas Paine and symbols of the Enlightenment

The freethought movement first organized itself in the United States as the "Free Press Association" in 1827 in defense of George Houston, publisher of The Correspondent, an early journal of Biblical criticism in an era when blasphemy convictions were still possible. Houston had helped found an Owenite community at Haverstraw, New York in 1826–27. The short-lived Correspondent was superseded by the Free Enquirer, the official organ of Robert Owen's New Harmony community in Indiana, edited by Robert Dale Owen and by Fanny Wright between 1828 and 1832 in New York. During this time Robert Dale Owen sought to introduce the philosophic skepticism of the Freethought movement into the Workingmen's Party in New York City. The Free Enquirer's annual civic celebrations of Paine's birthday after 1825 finally coalesced in 1836 in the first national freethinkers organization, the "United States Moral and Philosophical Society for the General Diffusion of Useful Knowledge". It was founded on August 1, 1836, at a national convention at the Lyceum in Saratoga Springs with Isaac S. Smith of Buffalo, New York, as president. Smith was also the 1836 Equal Rights Party's candidate for Governor of New York and had also been the Workingmen's Party candidate for Lt. Governor of New York in 1830. The Moral and Philosophical Society published The Beacon, edited by Gilbert Vale.

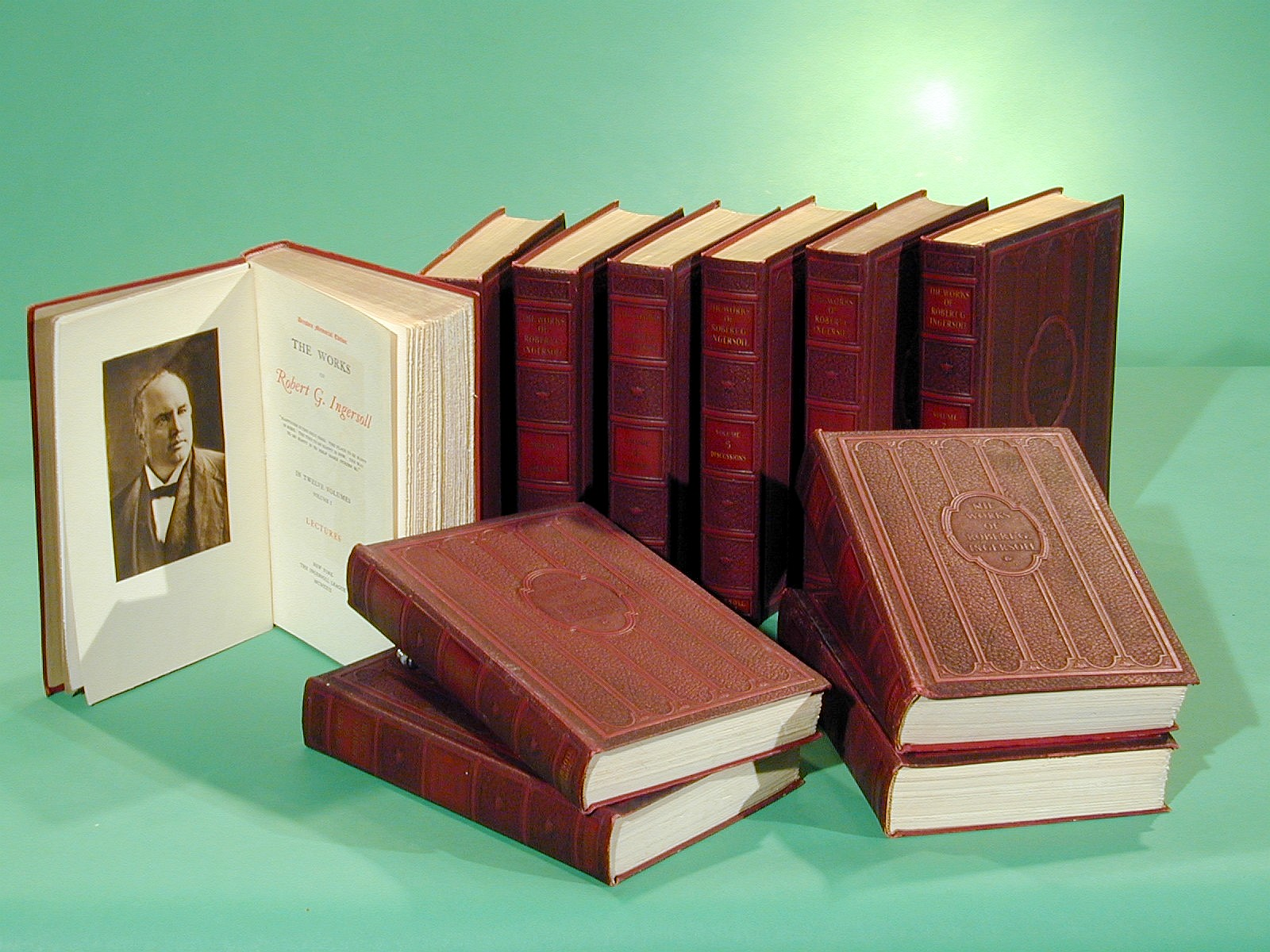
Collected works of Robert G. Ingersoll

Driven by the revolutions of 1848 in the German states, the 19th century saw an immigration of German freethinkers and anti-clericalists to the United States (see Forty-Eighters). In the United States, they hoped to be able to live by their principles, without interference from government and church authorities.

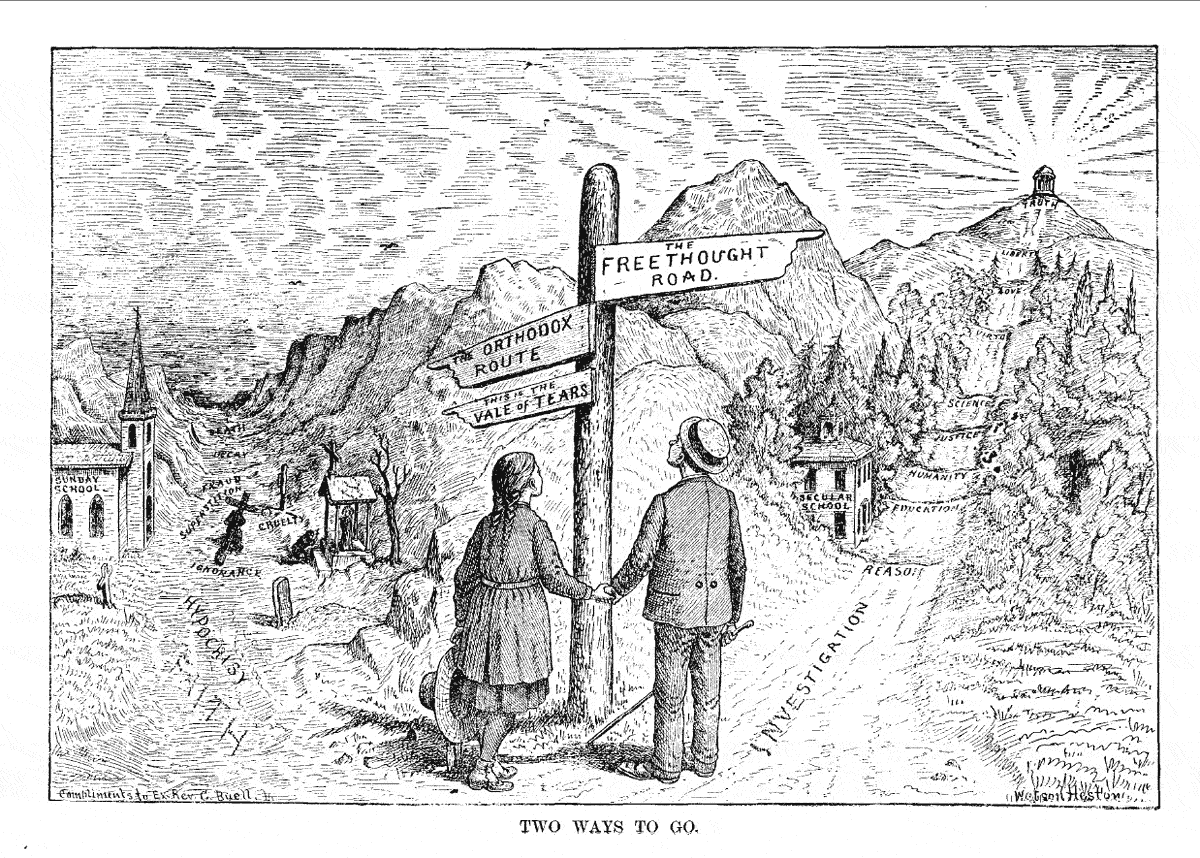
Watson Heston, Two Ways to Go, 1896

Many Freethinkers settled in German immigrant strongholds, including St. Louis, Indianapolis, Wisconsin, and Texas, where they founded the town of Comfort, Texas, as well as others.

These groups of German Freethinkers referred to their organizations as Freie Gemeinden, or "free congregations". The first Freie Gemeinde was established in St. Louis in 1850. Others followed in Pennsylvania, California, Washington, D.C., New York, Illinois, Wisconsin, Texas, and other states.

Freethinkers tended to be liberal, espousing ideals such as racial, social, and sexual equality, and the abolition of slavery.

The "Golden Age of Freethought" in the US came in the late 1800s. The dominant organization was the National Liberal League which formed in 1876 in Philadelphia. This group re-formed itself in 1885 as the American Secular Union under the leadership of the eminent agnostic orator Robert G. Ingersoll. Following Ingersoll's death in 1899 the organization declined, in part due to lack of effective leadership.

Freethought in the United States declined in the early twentieth century. By the early twentieth century, most freethought congregations had disbanded or joined other mainstream churches. The longest continuously operating freethought congregation in America is the Free Congregation of Sauk County, Wisconsin, which was founded in 1852 and is still active as of 2020. It affiliated with the American Unitarian Association (now the Unitarian Universalist Association) in 1955. D. M. Bennett was the founder and publisher of The Truth Seeker in 1873, a radical freethought and reform American periodical.

German freethinker settlements were located in:

- Burlington, Racine County, Wisconsin
- Belleville, St. Clair County, Illinois
- Castell, Llano County, Texas
- Comfort, Kendall County, Texas
- Davenport, Scott County, Iowa
- Fond du Lac, Fond du Lac County, Wisconsin
- Frelsburg, Colorado County, Texas
- Hermann, Gasconade County, Missouri
- Jefferson, Jefferson County, Wisconsin
- Indianapolis, Indiana
- Latium, Washington County, Texas
- Manitowoc, Manitowoc County, Wisconsin
- Meyersville, DeWitt County, Texas
- Milwaukee, Wisconsin
- Millheim, Austin County, Texas
- Oshkosh, Winnebago County, Wisconsin
- Ratcliffe, DeWitt County, Texas
- Sauk City, Sauk County, Wisconsin
- Shelby, Austin County, Texas
- Sisterdale, Kendall County, Texas
- St. Louis, Missouri
- Tusculum, Kendall County, Texas
- Two Rivers, Manitowoc County, Wisconsin
- Watertown, Dodge County, Wisconsin

=== Anarchism ===
==== United States tradition ====
Freethought influenced the development of anarchism in the United States. In the U.S.,

"freethought was a basically anti-Christian, anti-clerical movement, whose purpose was to make the individual politically and spiritually free to decide for himself on religious matters. A number of contributors to Liberty were prominent figures in both freethought and anarchism. The American individualist anarchist George MacDonald [(1857–1944)] was a co-editor of Freethought and, for a time, The Truth Seeker. E. C. Walker was co-editor of the freethought/free love journal Lucifer, the Light-Bearer."

"Many of the anarchists were ardent freethinkers; reprints from freethought papers such as Lucifer, the Light-Bearer, Freethought and The Truth Seeker appeared in Liberty...The church was viewed as a common ally of the state and as a repressive force in and of itself."

==== European tradition ====
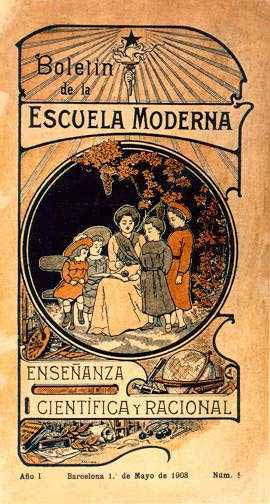
The Boletín de la Escuela Moderna, 1905, edited by Francisco Ferrer

In Europe, a similar development occurred in French and Spanish individualist anarchist circles:

"Anticlericalism, just as in the rest of the libertarian movement, in another of the frequent elements which will gain relevance related to the measure in which the (French) Republic begins to have conflicts with the church...Anti-clerical discourse, frequently called for by the French individualist André Lorulot [(1885–1963)], will have its impacts in Estudios (a Spanish individualist anarchist publication). There will be an attack on institutionalized religion for the responsibility that it had in the past on negative developments, for its irrationality which makes it a counterpoint of philosophical and scientific progress. There will be a criticism of proselytism and ideological manipulation which happens on both believers and agnostics".

These tendencies would continue in French individualist anarchism in the work and activism of Charles-Auguste Bontemps (1893–1981) and others. In the Spanish individualist anarchist magazines Ética and Iniciales

"there is a strong interest in publishing scientific news, usually linked to a certain atheist and anti-theist obsession, philosophy which will also work for pointing out the incompatibility between science and religion, faith, and reason. In this way, there will be a lot of talk on Charles Darwin's theories or on the negation of the existence of the soul".

In 1901, the Catalan anarchist and freethinker Francesc Ferrer i Guàrdia established "modern" or progressive schools in Barcelona in defiance of an educational system controlled by the Catholic Church. The schools had the stated goal to "educate the working class in a rational, secular and non-coercive setting". Fiercely anti-clerical, Ferrer believed in "freedom in education", education free from the authority of church and state. Ferrer's ideas, generally, formed the inspiration for a series of Modern Schools in the United States, Cuba, South America, and London. The first of these started in New York City in 1911. Ferrer also inspired the Italian newspaper Università popolare, founded in 1901.

== In Freemasonry ==
Freemasonry served an important purpose in the spreading of the freethinking movement. Freemason lodges in 18th century Europe served as sites for enlightenment thinking and discussion of new ideas, helping spread freethought philosophies. The informal, secretive nature of the lodges allowed intellectuals and elites to gather and debate radical topics away from the scrutiny of church and state.

Freemasonry attracted many freethinkers and became a hub of the movement, during the Enlightenment era due to its emphasis on inclusive membership, logic, rationalism, and religious tolerance. Freemasonry's origins from stonemason guilds meant its symbolism and rituals drew on concepts from the Trivium and Quadrivium, they include the Mastery of Grammar, Rhetoric, logic then mastery of arithmetic, geometry, music, and astronomy as well as other arts such as the mechanical arts, reflecting Enlightenment ideals in the goal of making its members Masters of their thoughts and opinions thus making them Freethinkers. This distinguished Freemasonry from other fraternal orders focused on chivalry or Christian morality.

=== Rationalism and science ===
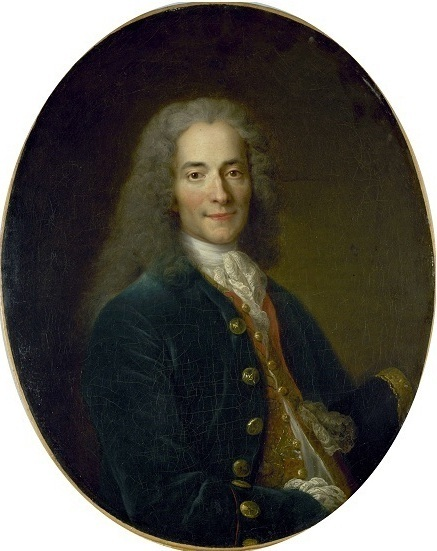
Voltaire

Due to Freemasonry utilizing extensive symbols and allegories related to mathematics, geometry, and architecture, conveying the importance of reason and science, and the central Masonic symbol of the compass and square represented logic and rigor as well references to the "Great Architect of the Universe", these concepts were interpreted as a deist scientific creator by Enlightenment freethinkers.

Influential early Speculative Masonic writings by James Anderson and Jean-Theophile Desaguliers frequently cited Isaac Newton and promoted Newtonian scientific ideas. Desaguliers was a close friend and student of Newton, further spreading Newton's theories to lodges. Geometry textbooks and lectures were common in early lodges, aligning with Enlightenment interest in mathematics and science.

Freemasonry's multi-tiered system of initiation rituals allegorically used the tools, stages, and concepts of architecture and mechanics to represent enlightenment and self-improvement through education and reason. This resonated with freethinkers' belief in perfecting society through spreading knowledge.

=== Religious tolerance ===
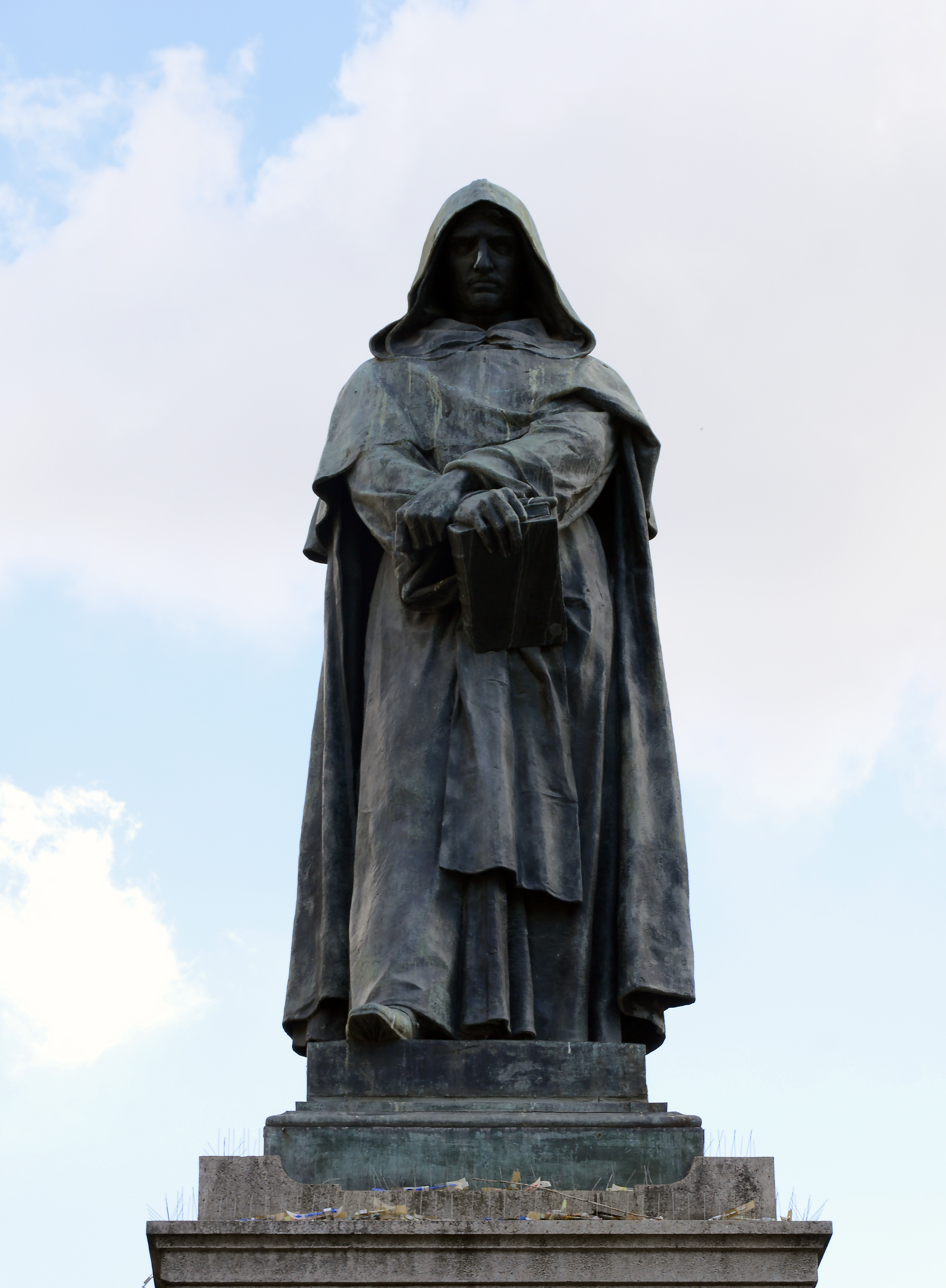
In 1889, a statue of Giordano Bruno was erected at the site of his execution, by freethinkers from several countries.

Unlike most contemporary fraternal orders, Freemasonry did not require its members to follow a specific religious creed. This openness allowed men of diverse faiths, including deists, to join local lodges throughout Europe and America in the Enlightenment era allowing Freethought to flourish. While utilizing religious imagery and themes, Freemasonry intentionally avoided dogmatic disputes and focused its moral lessons on shared values of virtue, charity, and righteousness thereby allowing its members to think for themselves.

This religious tolerance attracted Enlightenment thinkers, like Voltaire, who viewed organized religion as upholding oppressive traditional monarchs and hindering freethought. Benjamin Franklin praised Masonic principles of "liberality, tolerance and unity in essentials, leaving each Brother to his own opinions on non-essentials" in his writings.

=== Political liberalism ===
Many Enlightenment freethinkers perceived established dogmas as oppressing freethought. Consequently, the secrecy and hierarchical Initiatory structure of Freemasonry alarmed some authoritarian states, concerned it could encourage free and revolutionary ideas.

However, most Masonic lodges mainly aimed to promote morality, sociability, freedom and philanthropic causes rather than radical politics. Values of freethinking, liberty, equality, and opposition to tyranny were also celebrated in Masonic rituals and writings, many rituals have for motto "Liberty, Equality, Fraternity". This intellectual spirit likely contributed to many Freemasons supporting independence movements and participating as Founding Fathers of the United States.

In the 19th and 20th centuries, some authoritarian states were against Freemasonry, suspecting it of encouraging freethinking philosophies and suppressed Masonic lodges and members.

=== Pursuit of mastery ===
A core goal of Freemasonry's initiatory system is to guide people's intellectual and moral development towards mastery and self enlightenment. Masonic rituals and degrees symbolically depict the passage from an Apprentice to Fellowcraft to Master Mason as a metaphor for independent learning and self-improvement to the goal of becoming a Master of himself, thus a full freethinker.

Attaining mastery is presented as freeing someone's mind from blind reliance on authorities and dogmas so they can autonomously reason and have educated opinions. The perfectibility of human nature through education and liberty is a key theme. This aligns with freethinkers' views on thinking for oneself using logic and empiricism.

However, this does not mean that a Freemason cannot follow a dogma rather that as a freethinker, the Mason can, if they want, decide to follow a dogma on their own free will and accord, not because they are told to do so but by their own enlightened choice.

== See also ==
- Brights movement
- Critical rationalism
- Freethought Day
- Religious skepticism
