= Etta Semple =

American politician

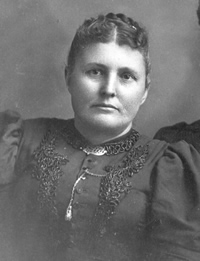
- Born: Martha Etta Donaldson; September 21, 1854; Quincy, Illinois, U.S.
- Died: April 11, 1914 (aged 59); Ottawa, Kansas, U.S.
- Known for: Atheist activism, publication of Freethought Ideal, creation of natural health sanitarium in Kansas
- Notable work: Freethought Ideal

Etta Semple (née Martha Etta Donaldson September 21, 1854 - April 11, 1914) was an American atheist and feminist activist, editor, publisher and community leader in Ottawa, Kansas. She was the president of the Kansas Freethought Association and, in later life, founded a "Natural Cure" sanitorium for 31 patients. Semple was part of a group of people in Kansas who actively fought the intrusion of religion into United States government, when prominent religious leaders of the time were "pushing to amend the US Constitution and declare America a Christian nation."

== Biography ==
Semple was born in Quincy, Illinois, to a Baptist family. Semple witnessed "rampant hyposcrisy and bigotry among Christians." Eventually Semple began to see religion as a sort of "ignorance and superstition."

Semple founded the Kansas Freethought Association (KFA) in order to protect the separation of church and state. Semple was elected president of the KFA in 1879. KFA eventually became the subject of censorship by town and church leaders. Briefly, Semple served as the vice president of the American Secular Union.

In 1887, she married her second husband, Matthew Semple. Both she and Matthew were active in the labor movement. Semple wrote two novels with themes relating to labor movement, called The Strike and Society. She also ran twice for public office with the Socialist Labor party ticket. Semple eventually was able to become a superintendent of public instruction.

Using her own money and time, Semple self-published a bimonthly newspaper called Freethought Ideal which had a circulation of 2,000. Semple also had the help of Laura Knox in editing and publishing. Freethought Ideal was published between 1898 and 1901, and allowed Semple to speak her mind without being censored. In an editorial appearing in 1898, she said, "Every true Freethinker accords to each individual the right to mental freedom. Where this freedom leads is no concern of others so long as it encroaches not upon their rights." Every issue of the Freethought Ideal offered a $1,000 reward to anyone who could give positive proof of the supernatural, including God. She also worked with cartoonist Watson Heston, who provided work for the Freethought Ideal. Her work on this newspaper was praised by the contemporary The Free Thought Magazine. In 1901, Semple decided that she was tired of "trying to talk sense to the rest of the world" and stopped publication of Freethought Ideal.

She was also involved in the temperance movement and met once with Carrie Nation in 1901. They were seen "arm-in-arm, engaged in earnest but amiable debate."

Also in 1901, Semple's husband became ill and since she was no longer working on the paper, she was able to devote time to helping him recover. Semple eventually ran a sanitorium out of her own home and for many years and it was the only hospital in the area. Semple would not turn away anyone, even if they were unable to afford to pay for care. Semple was called a 'Good Samaritan' and "one of the greatest benefactors Ottawa has ever had" by the Evening Herald (Ottawa). In 1905, in an unsolved murder, one of Semple's patients was killed inside the sanitarium by someone who came in through Semple's bedroom window with a knife and axe. Semple had given up her room to a sick patient, so it was believed that Semple was the intended victim.

Semple died from influenza in 1914. She was mourned by the entire town with headlines in the paper reading: "A Philanthropist Will Long Be Remembered Here" and "Good Deeds of a Good Woman Are on the Tongues of Ottawa Today". At her funeral, there were no prayers or hymns and the eulogizer read many of her favorite poems. They sang the secular song, "Scattering Seeds of Kindness".

For many years, her grave was unmarked, until in 2002, the Franklin County Historical Society raised enough money to erect a marker with the epitaph she wrote for herself on the stone. Her epitaph reads: "Atheist, Radical, Socialist. Feminist, Philanthropist and Free thinker. Etta was a newspaper editor, publisher, novelist, a medical intuitive, sanitarium founder and operator, and a champion of the downtrodden."

The building that housed her sanatorium was condemned in 2015. While many individuals wanted it preserved, it never received protected status.
