= Watson Heston =

American cartoonist

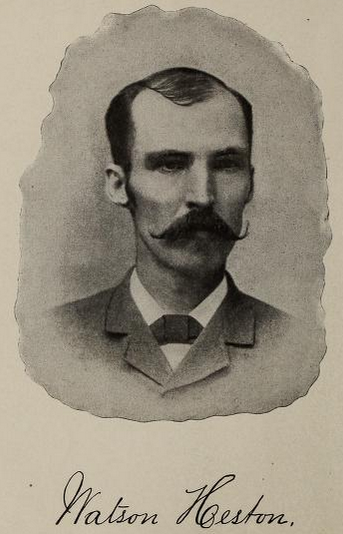
Watson Heston's depiction of himself

Watson Heston (September 25, 1846 – January 27, 1905) was an American editorial cartoonist who peaked in popularity during the Golden Age of Freethought in the late 19th century.

== Biography ==
Born in Ohio, he spent the majority of his life in Carthage, Missouri. He published cartoons satirising the Republican party in People's Party publications, and his cartoons satirising religion in general and Christianity in particular, appeared in the famous freethought newspapers Truth Seeker, Etta Semple's Free-Thought Ideal, and other regional papers. Later, he would write and illustrate The Old Testament Comically Illustrated (1892), and The New Testament Comically Illustrated (1898), which caricature scenes from the Bible. In 1890, Heston published a critique of the involvement of religious clergy in politics, calling for strict separation of church and state.

The Bible Comically Illustrated was published in 1900 by the Truth Seeker Company and sold at least 10,000 copies. Few copies of this book or his earlier works survive, as most were apparently destroyed by those who saw his works as blasphemy. His works can be found on sale from time to time, with the asking prices usually reaching $2,000.

== Gallery ==
Cartoons by Watson Heston
Famous among his caricatures of bible scenes are his depiction of Elisha watching two female bears mauling forty-two boys in 2 Kings 2:24.

In another cartoon, Heston calls on readers to reflect on the incest between Daughters in Genesis 19:30-38.

Heston caricatures Moses killing an Egyptian

Heston caricatures the Ten Commandments, changing "thou shalt not commit adultery" to "thou shalt not do as the preachers are wont to do"

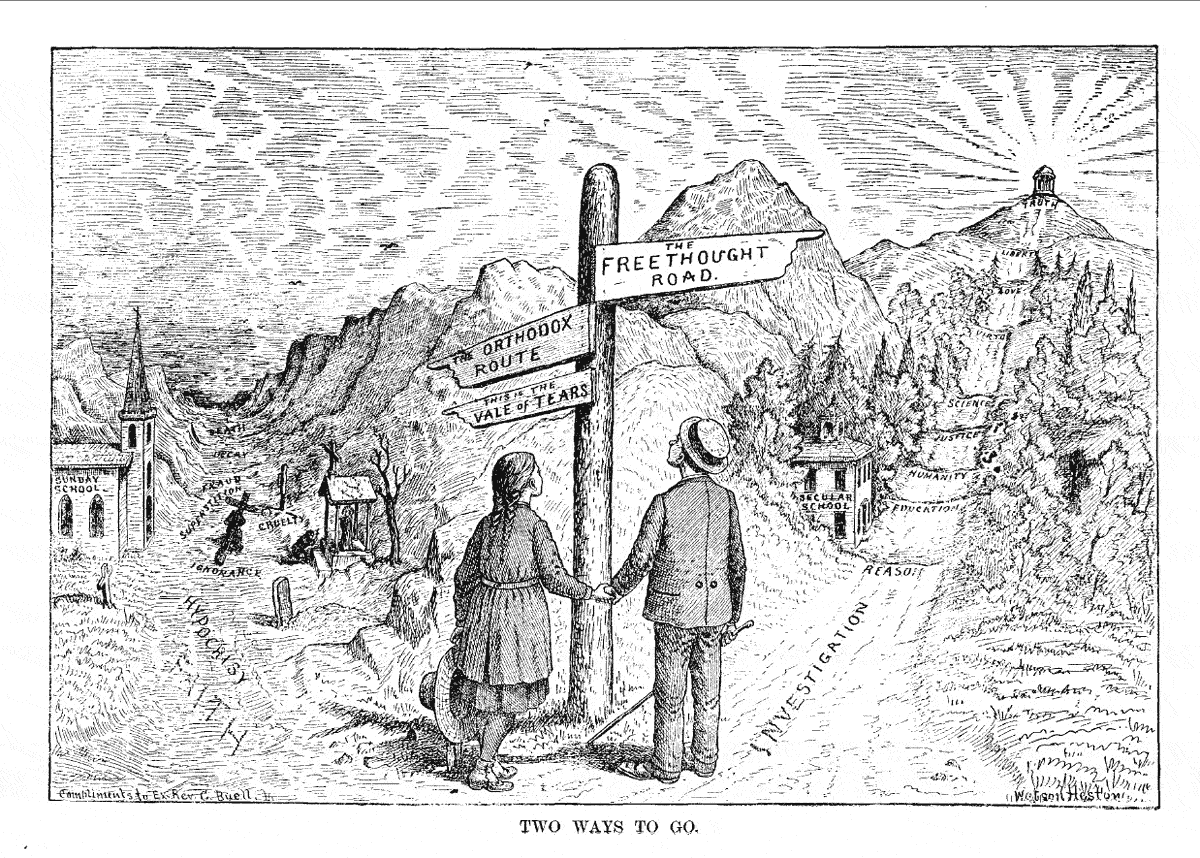
Two Ways to Go, 1896
