= American Secular Union =

The American Secular Union (ASU, also sometimes called the "American Secular Union and Freethought Federation") espoused secularism and freethought at the end of the 19th century in the United States.

As the National Liberal League suffered crippling factionalism and radicalization over the period 1878 to 1885, liberals reorganized in a non-political "American Secular Union" in 1884. Colonel Robert Green Ingersoll (1833–1899) served as the first president of the Union. Ida Craddock was elected Secretary of the Philadelphia chapter of the Union in 1889.

The American Secular Union and Freethought Federation dedicated themselves to the separation of church and state, and for its platform used the nine demands of liberalism, namely:

1. that churches and other ecclesiastical property shall be no longer exempt from taxation;
2. that the employment of chaplains in the United States Congress, in state legislaturess in the United States Army and United States Navy, and in prisons, asylums, and all institutions supported by public money, shall be discontinued, and that all religious services maintained by national, state, or municipal governments shall be abolished;
3. that all public appropriations for educational and charitable institutions of a sectarian character shall cease;
4. that, while advocating the loftiest instruction in morals and the inculcation of the strictest uprightness of conduct, religious teaching and the use of the Bible for religious purposes in public schools shall be prohibited;
5. that the appointment by the President of the United States and the governors of the various states of religious festivals, fasts, and days of prayer and thanksgiving shall be discontinued;
6. that the theological oath in the courts and in other departments of government shall be abolished, and simple affirmation under the pains and penalties of perjury, established in its stead;
7. that all laws directly or indirectly enforcing in any degree the religious and theological dogmaated, and that all laws shall be conformed to the requirements of natural morality, equal rights and impartial justice;
8. that, in harmony with the Constitution of the United States and the constitutions of the several states, no special privileges or advantages shall be conceded to Christianity or any other religion; that our entire political system shall be conducted and administered on a purely secular basis; and that whatever changes are necessary to this end shall be consistently, unflinchingly, and promptly made.

The American Secular Union published over a dozen pamphlets on topics regarding separation of church and state between 1886 and 1928.

Following Ingersoll's death in 1899 various leadership changes occurred. The organization withered around 1919.

== See also ==
- Golden Age of Freethought
