= Golden Age of Freethought =

19th-century intellectual movement in the USA

The Golden Age of Freethought is the mid 19th-century period in United States history which saw the development of freethought as an organized movement. The Age, roughly from 1875 to 1914, is referred to by at least one contemporary writer as "the high water mark of freethought as an influential movement in American society". It began around 1856 and lasted at least through the end of the century; author Susan Jacoby places the end of the Golden Age at the start of World War I.

Freethought is a philosophical position that holds that ideas and opinions should be based on science and reason, and not restricted by authority, tradition, or religion. It is characteristic of the 18th century Enlightenment but hardly confined to any one epoch or place. The late nineteenth century American Golden Age was encouraged by the lectures of the extremely popular agnostic orator Robert Green Ingersoll, the popularization of Charles Darwin's On the Origin of Species, the push for women's suffrage, and other political, scientific, and social trends that clashed with religious orthodoxy and caused people to question the traditional ideas about the world that they encountered in received opinion.

A freethinker of the late 19th century could have been someone from any of the varied religious and political backgrounds. Charles Knowlton, D. M. Bennett, and Ingersoll were influential freethinkers of the period.

Robert G. Ingersoll (1833–1899) was one of the more prominent freethinkers of his time. He was known as the "Great Agnostic". Ingersoll, a lawyer, an orator and a Civil War veteran, is famous for his skeptical approaches to popular religious beliefs. He would speak in public about orthodox views and would often poke fun at them. Guests would pay $1 to hear him speak (equivalent to $33 in 2025). Ingersoll was the leader of the American Secular Union, successor organization to the National Liberal League.

Charles Knowlton was born into a Puritan household in 1800. The science and medicine practiced around this time was known as "heroic". Heroic medicinal treatment was rather medieval and consisted of blood-letting, and induced vomiting and profuse sweating. These treatments, far from being restorative, usually actually proved harmful to patients. Knowlton had wet dreams in his adolescence, leading him to be the subject of many types of heroic treatment. The revulsion that these interventions induced in him prompted him to pursue humane approaches to treatment. Believing that effective and healthy treatment must be founded on a sound understanding of human anatomy, he began body snatching from graves and studying the bodies he exhumed. Knowlton was imprisoned for this. On release his concern for the introduction of more humane medicine was undimmed. He became a doctor, putting his scientific findings into his practice. He also married into a family of freethinkers.

Knowlton wrote "Elements of Modern Materialism" and "Fruits of Philosophy" in 1832. The second would prove much more successful. The book included a spermicidal method which he had invented.
