= D. M. Bennett =

American freethought writer (1818–1882)

DeRobigne Mortimer Bennett
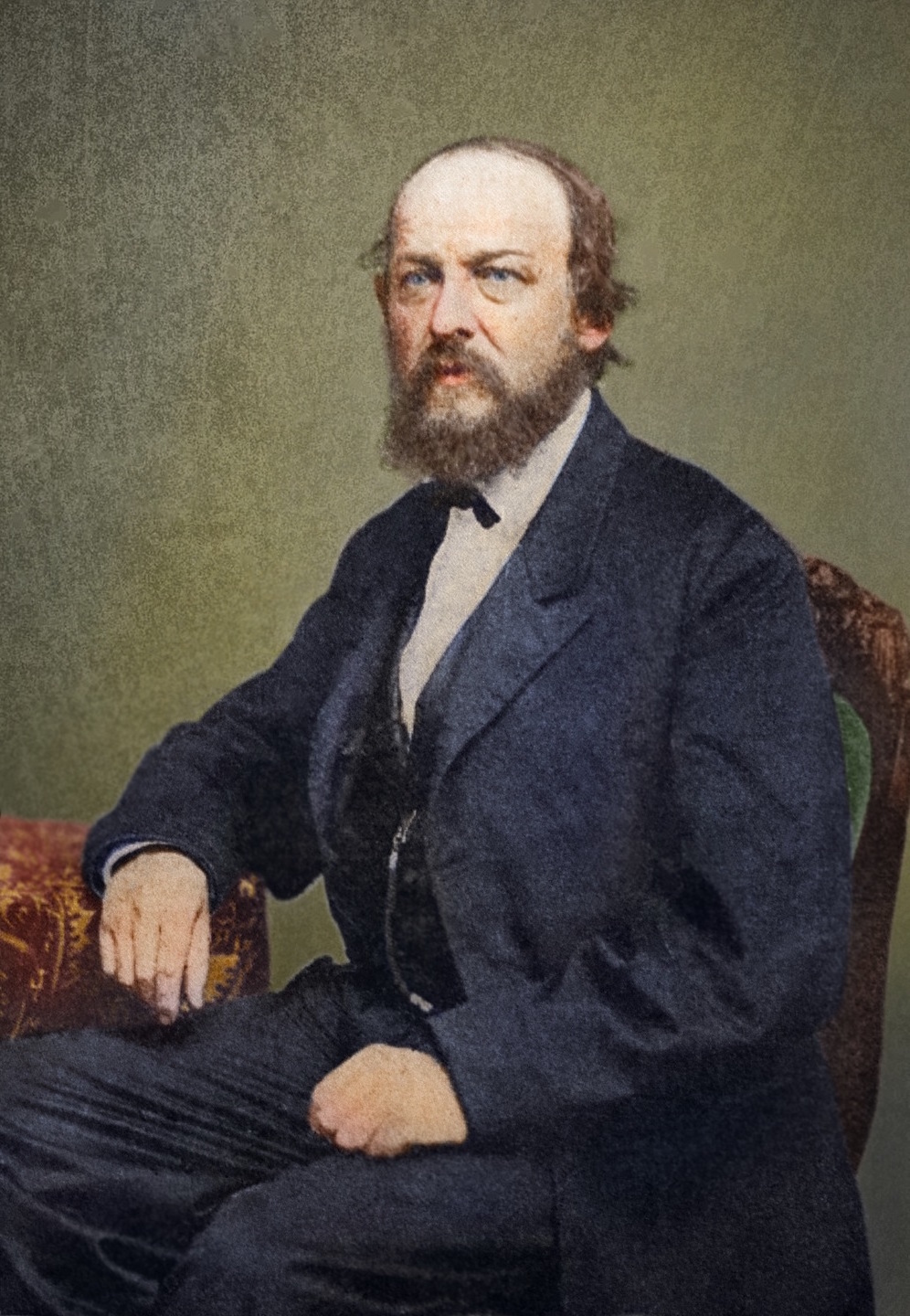
- Born: December 23, 1818; Springfield, New York, US
- Died: December 6, 1882 (aged 63); Manhattan, New York, US
- Occupations: Freethought writer, editor, publisher

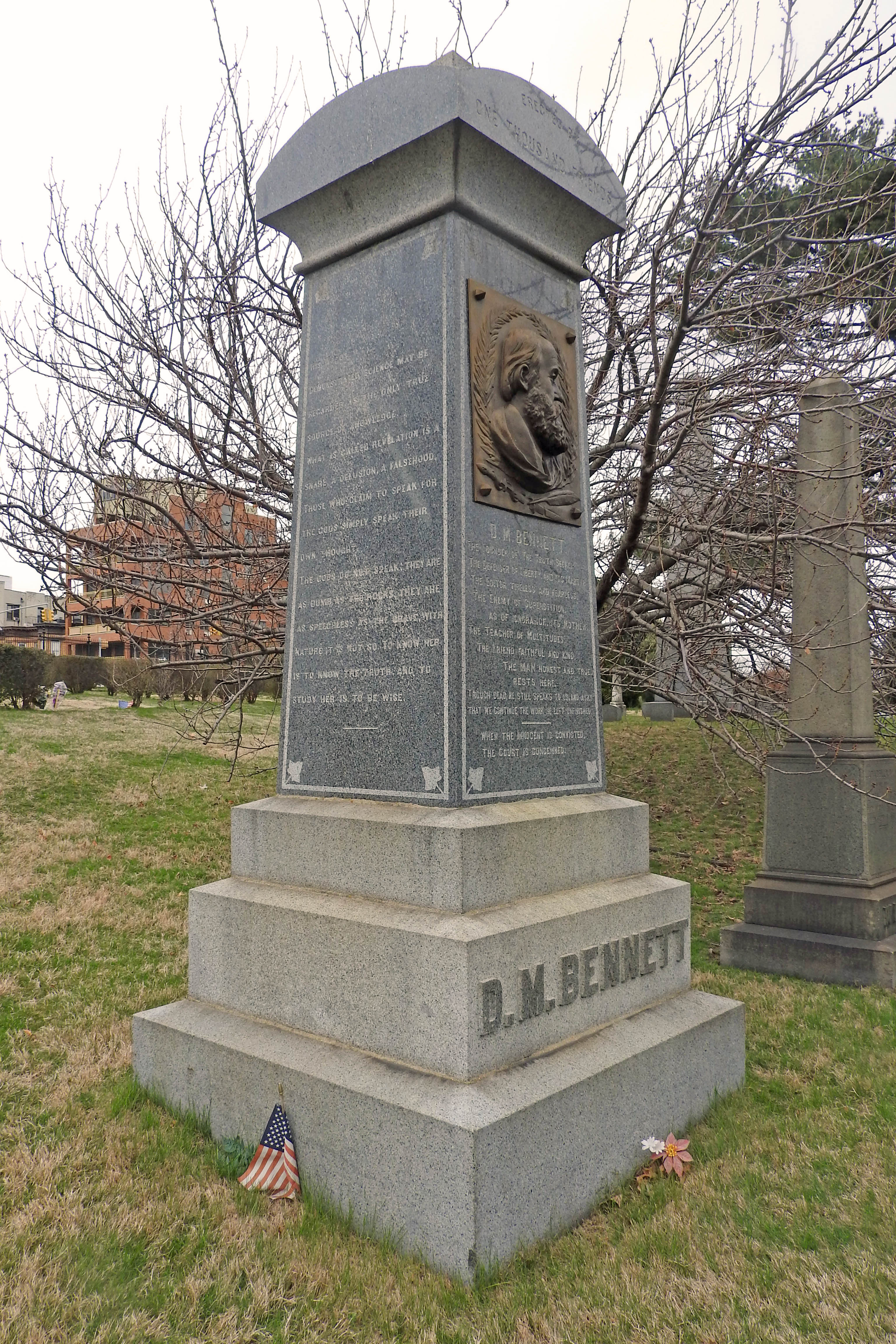
Tomb in Brooklyn

DeRobigne Mortimer Bennett (December 23, 1818 – December 6, 1882), best known as D.M. Bennett, was an American writer and publisher who was the founder of The Truth Seeker, a radical freethought and reform American periodical.

== Biography ==
=== Shaker life ===
Derobigne M. Bennett and his sister, Letsy Ann, were admitted as Shakers in New Lebanon, New York, in 1834. Living in the Church Family's First Order, he worked as a shoemaker, boys' caretaker, herbalist, physician, and scribe, writing part of the Journal of Inspirational Meetings in 1840 before his questioning nature became evident. His life with the Shakers ended in 1846 when he eloped with Mary Wicks at the same time his sister Letsy Ann Bennett eloped with John Allen, all four of them slipping away from the Shaker village unnoticed.

=== Freethinker ===
After leaving the Shakers, Bennett evolved into a "freethinker", founding The Truth Seeker newspaper with his wife Mary Wicks Bennett in 1873. In 1878, Bennett wrote that "Jesuism", rather than Pauline Christianity, was the gospel taught by Peter, John and James.

On 1 September 1873, D. M. and M. W. Bennett released the first tabloid edition of The Truth Seeker. Its masthead announced its purpose:

Devoted to: science, morals, free thought, free discussions, liberalism, sexual equality, labor reform, progression, free education and whatever tends to elevate and emancipate the human race.

Opposed to: priestcraft, ecclesiasticism, dogmas, creeds, false theology, superstition, bigotry, ignorance, monopolies, aristocracies, privileged classes, tyranny, oppression, and everything that degrades or burdens mankind mentally or physically.

.

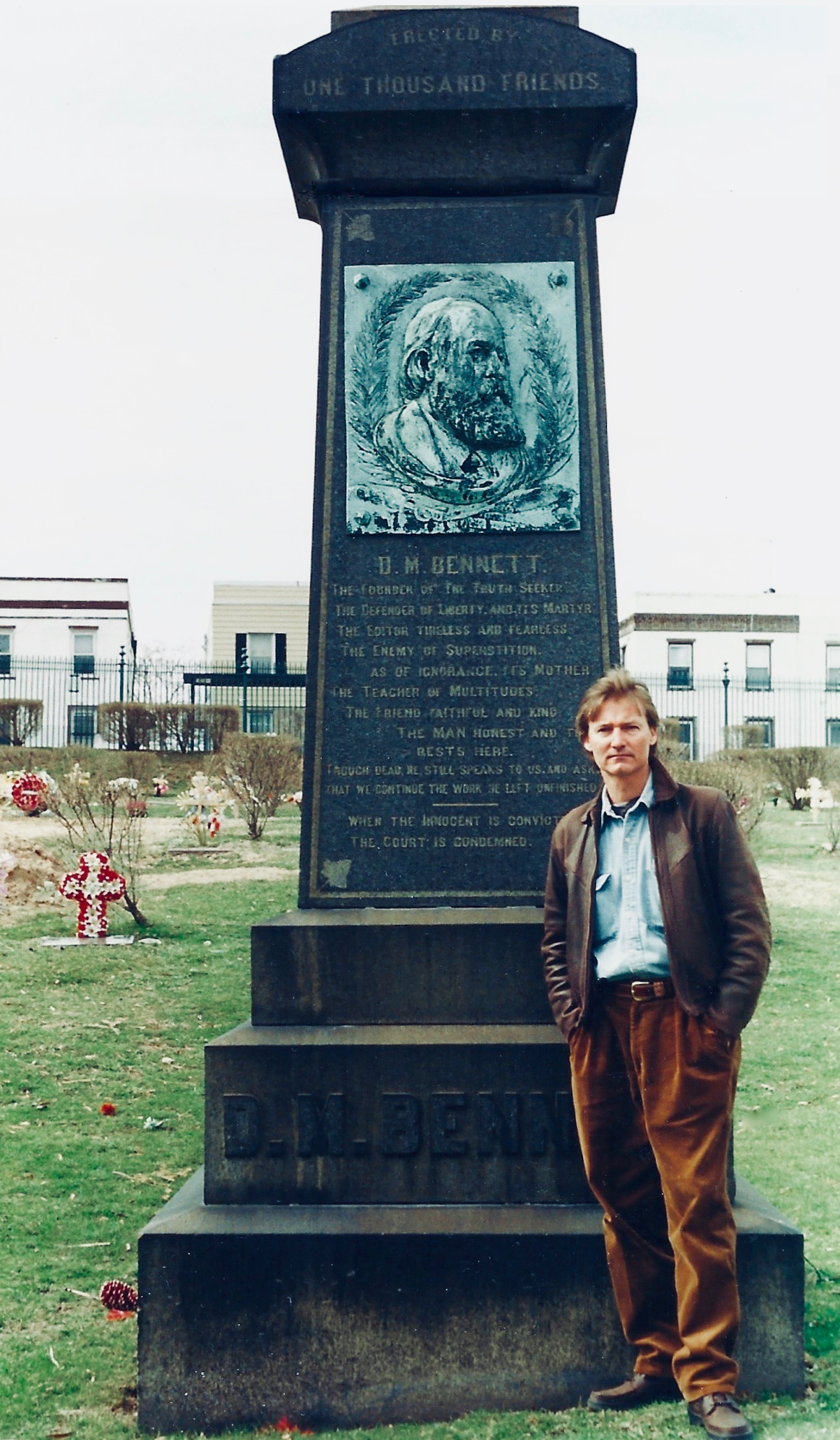
Roderick Bradford at the D.M. Bennett Monument in Green-Wood Cemetery, Brooklyn, New York. April, 1995.

D.M. Bennett is interred at Green-Wood Cemetery in Brooklyn, New York. His monument, erected by his fellow freethinkers, is covered with his statements.

Bennett was the subject of the biography D.M. Bennett: The Truth Seeker (2006) by Roderick Bradford and a 2009 documentary.

== Obscenity prosecution ==
United States Postal Inspector Anthony Comstock had Bennett arrested on December 10, 1878, for mailing Cupid's Yokes, a free love pamphlet. Bennett was prosecuted, subjected to a widely publicized trial, and imprisoned in the Albany Penitentiary for 11 months, during which his health greatly suffered. Despite a strong campaign in his favor for President Rutherford B. Hayes to pardon him, Hayes declined, pardoning the actual author (Ezra Heywood) instead.

== Publications ==
- An Open Letter to Jesus Christ (1875)
- The World's Sages, Thinkers and Reformers (1876)
- Thirty Discussions, Bible Stories: Essays and Lectures (1876)
- Interrogatories to Jehovah (1878)
- The Champions of the Church: Their Crimes and Persecutions (1878)
- Answers to Christian Questions and Arguments (1880)
- The Gods and Religions of Ancient and Modern Times (1880)
- A Truth Seeker in Europe (1881)
- A Truth Seeker Around the World (1882)
- The Semitic Gods and the Bible (1912)
