= National Liberal League =

US political organization

The National Liberal League (1876 – c.1885) of the United States advocated separation of church and state and the freedom of religion. The league evolved into the American Secular Union in 1884. The First Unitarian Society of Minneapolis grew directly out of the chapter there.

== History ==
The National Liberal League was one of the first national organizations dedicated to separating church and state. It was presaged by a series of local organizations that emerged before the Civil War that sought to combat Sunday laws, bible-reading in public schools, and other government policies perceived to violate religious liberty. These issues would concern the National Liberal League that formed in the 1870s. Officers included Francis E. Abbott, T.B. Wakeman, Elizur Wright, Robert G. Ingersoll, and others. Annual conventions took place in Syracuse (1878) Cincinnati (1879), St. Louis (1882), Milwaukee (1883), and Cleveland (1885).

In 1884 The Radical Review observed that the League "gave promises of great usefulness in the early years of its existence. In the fall of 1878 its activity was crippled by the appearance of some of those internal strifes and dissentions which seem to be the inevitable accompaniment of the development of all reformatory organisations. To screen personal animosities, always contemptible, side issues were introduced, and the essential aim of the League lost sight of. ... The National Liberal League split on the discussion of the constitutionality of the so-called Comstock law of 1873." Ingersoll resigned from his vice-presidency after the 1879 convention, in opposition to an adopted motion to provide a general defense, rather than his preference to exclude distributors of prurient material and only defend "real Freethought". The league evolved into the American Secular Union around 1885. Circa November 1901, a faction of the American Secular Union split off, and resumed use of the older "National Liberal League" name.

== Second Incarnation ==
The name was again in use circa 1945 by an organization which is claimed to have been unrelated. During Eisenhower's presidency, the National Liberal League questioned the appointment of William Brennan to the Supreme Court. In the 1960s, James Hervey Johnson is reported to have assumed the leadership of the National Liberal League of that era. Current era records suggest that Johnson relocated operations in his era of the 1947-founded organization to California, that the organization renamed itself in 1966 to the "National League For The Separation Of Church And State", and that subsequent to Johnson's death an organization of that name continued in New York, with leadership passing to Fred Edwords.

== See also ==
National Reform Association (1864)
