= Natural morality =

Morality that is based on human nature

Natural morality refers to morality that is based on human nature, rather than acquired from societal norms or religious teachings. Charles Darwin's theory of evolution is central to many modern conceptions of natural morality, but the concept goes back at least to naturalism.

== Darwinian morality ==
Charles Darwin defends a naturalist approach to morality. In The Descent of Man, he argues that moral behaviour has outgrown from animal tendency for empathy through evolution of morality. By comparing human and animal behavior through a naturalist approach, he concludes that moral sense is based on the species' sociability, notably altruism.

=== Altruism and selfishness ===
In Darwin's view, empathy lays as the foundation for our actions, as opposed to selfishness. He states that humans can generally distinguish between altruism (the "high moral rules") and selfishness (the "low moral rules"):

The higher are founded on the social instinct, and relate to the welfare of others. They are supported by the approbation of our fellow-men and by reason. The lower rules, though some of them when implying self-sacrifice hardly deserve to be called lower, relate chiefly to self, and arise from public opinion, matured by experience and cultivation..

=== Morality from sympathy ===
Darwin suggests sympathy is at the core of sociability and is an instinctive emotion found in most social animals. The ability to recognize and act upon others' distress or danger, is a suggestive evidence of instinctive sympathy; common mutual services found among many social animals, such as hunting and travelling in groups, warning others of danger and mutually defending one another, are some examples of instinctive sympathy Darwin offers. He insists it must be sympathy that compels an individual to risk his or her own life for another from his community.

Darwin suggests further that the role of acceptance of others acts as a guide for conduct; sympathy enables to obtain approval of others instead of rejection. Social animals, when separated from the herd, cannot endure solitude and oftentimes perish. Darwin argues social animals have a natural dislike for solitude, and states: "solitary confinement is one of the severest punishments which can be inflicted."

=== Natural morality for survival ===
Because of the instinctive nature of sympathy and its general recurrence among many social animals, Darwin deduces this emotional character must be inherited through natural selection. From a naturalist point of view, probably, instinctive sympathy was first developed for animals to thrive by living in society just as the pleasure of eating was first acquired to induce animals to eat. In this sense, morality is a crucial instinct for survival in social animals. As Darwin noted in The Descent of Man:

No tribe could hold together if murder, robbery, treachery, etc, were common.

Instinctive altruism effectively enables individuals to guarantee the survival of the group, which in turn will aid the survival of the individual. In The Descent of Man, Darwin notes:

Actions regarded by savages, and were probably so regarded by primaeval man, are good or bad, solely as they obviously affect the welfare of the tribe - not that of the species, nor that of an individual member of the tribe. This conclusion agrees well with the belief that the so-called moral sense is aboriginally derived from the social instincts, for both relate at first exclusively to the community.

=== Human morality ===
Mankind is a social animal, and has inherited its moral traits through the evolution of morality. As Darwin notes, the moral difference between mankind and animals, however, is "certainly one of degree and not of kind." Emotions such as remorse, regret or shame one may feel, stem from human's incessant reflection on past experiences and preoccupation with the judgement of others.

== See also ==
- Ethics
- Evolution of empathy
- Naturalism (philosophy)
