= Dixie Network =

American regional radio network

- Type: Radio
- Branding: "Dateline Dixie, news of the South for those in the South" "This is Dixie"
- Country: United States
- Founded: 1946 by Aaron B. Robinson, Sr
- Headquarters: Jackson, Tennessee, USA
- Broadcast area: Tennessee and Mississippi
- Dissolved: December 1973

The Dixie Network was a commercial radio broadcasting network operating in Tennessee and Mississippi beginning in 1946 and ending in December 1973. Three of the six AM stations had the letters "DX" within their call signs, such as WDXI in Jackson, Tennessee, WDXE-AM-FM, Lawrenceburg, Tennessee, and WDXN, Clarksville, Tennessee. These letters gave rise to usage of the term "Dixie Stations".

== History ==
Headquartered in Jackson, Tennessee, the stations were incorporated as separate corporations, each one founded by Aaron B. Robinson, Sr., principal owner and chief executive officer. The stations were: WCMA, Corinth, Mississippi, 1946; WENK, Union City, Tennessee, 1947; WDXI, Jackson, Tennessee, 1948; WDXE, Lawrenceburg, Tennessee, 1951; WTPR, Paris, Tennessee, 1951; WDXL, Lexington, Tennessee, 1954; WDXN, Clarksville, Tennessee, 1954; and WDXI-TV, Jackson, Tennessee, 1955. WDXL had been built in 1954 using equipment acquired when Robinson bought and shut down Jackson station WPLI the year prior; it was sold off the following year.

Dixie Network stations were known for a high degree of professionalism for small market operations. Always focused on local news and local community events, the stations and their personnel were known and respected for civic awareness and contributions.

Mr. Robinson, 55 years of age, died unexpectedly in December 1961. Under his will and testament, Robinson Enterprises, including the Dixie Network, were administered by the Trust Department of the former National Bank of Commerce in Jackson. J. Kenneth (Ken) Marston, manager of WDXE, was chosen by stockholders and National Bank of Commerce to assume general management of the Dixie Network beginning January 1962. WDXI-TV was sold to Bahakel Broadcasting Corporation of Charlotte, North Carolina, in 1966. The call sign became WBBJ-TV at that time.

In addition to community service by the respective stations management was known for participation in radio industry efforts beyond their station responsibilities. John E. Bell, manager, WCMA, Corinth, Mississippi served as President of the Mississippi Broadcast Association. J. Kenneth Marston, Sr. served as President of the Tennessee Association of Broadcasters. Still later, WDXI manager Charles R. Simms, served as President of the Tennessee Association of Broadcasters. Marston also was elected to the National Association of Broadcasters board of directors in 1970 Edward B. Fritts, who began his broadcast career at WENK, Union City, Tennessee, was elected President of The National Association of Broadcasters, Washington, D.C., where he led the national trade association with distinction.

Some station programming included "Dateline Dixie, news of the South for those in the South". T.N.T, temperature news and time with the outcue for many events including remotes broadcasts was "This is Dixie". The stations signed on by playing "Dixie".

The Dixie Network was wound down in the early 1970s; each station was sold under favorable conditions and concluded by close of business on December 31, 1973. At that time, Ken Marston was chosen by Tennessee radio and television broadcasters to transition the Tennessee Association of Broadcasters into a full-time trade association and establish its office and operations in Nashville. TAB had previously been an outgrowth of the University of Tennessee Knoxville.

== Former Dixie Network radio stations ==
- WCMA - Corinth, Mississippi - 1946
- WENK - Union City, Tennessee - 1947
- WDXI - Jackson, Tennessee - 1948
- WDXE - Lawrenceburg, Tennessee - 1951
- WDXE-FM - Lawrenceburg, Tennessee - 1965
- WTPR - Paris, Tennessee - 1953
- WDXN - Clarksville, Tennessee - 1954
- WDXI-TV - Jackson, Tennessee - 1955
