= WTJS =

WTJS may refer to:

- WTJS (FM), a radio station (93.1 FM) licensed to serve Alamo, Tennessee, United States
- WTJF (AM), a radio station (1390 AM) licensed to serve Jackson, Tennessee, which held the call sign WTJS from 1931 to 2017
