= WTJW =

WTJW may refer to:

- WTJW-LP, a low-power radio station (93.1 FM) licensed to serve Jasper, Indiana, United States
- WTJN-LP, a low-power radio station (107.1 FM) licensed to serve Troy, Ohio, United States, which held the call sign WTJW-LP in 2014
- WTJK, a radio station (105.3 FM) licensed to serve Humboldt, Tennessee, United States, which held the call sign WTJW from 2008 to 2012
