= WABD (disambiguation) =

WABD is a radio station (97.5 FM) licensed to Mobile, Alabama.

WABD may also refer to:

- Wabd, Kentucky, an unincorporated community
- WDLT-FM, a radio station (104.1 FM) licensed to Saraland, Alabama, which held the call sign WABD in 2012
- WCVQ, a radio station (107.9 FM) licensed to Fort Campbell, Kentucky, which held the call sign WABD-FM from 1968 to 1986
- WNYW, a Fox-owned-and-operated television station in New York, New York, which held the call sign WABD-TV from 1944 to 1958
- WQEZ, a radio station (1370 AM) licensed to Fort Campbell, Kentucky, which held the call sign WABD from 1968 to 2001
