= WVWF =

WVWF may refer to:

- WNZE, a radio station (1400 AM) licensed to serve Clarksville, Tennessee, United States, which held the call sign WVWF in 2020
- WJZM, a radio station (105.1 FM) licensed to serve Waverly, Tennessee, which held the call sign WVWF from 2019 to 2020
