= WVWB =

WVWB may refer to:

- WJZM, a radio station (105.1 FM) licensed to serve Waverly, Tennessee, United States, which held the call sign WVWB from 2020 to 2021
- WNZE, a radio station (1400 AM) licensed to serve Clarksville, Tennessee, which held the call sign WVWB from 2018 to 2019
