= WTNE =

WTNE may refer to:

- WTNE-LP, a low-power radio station (94.9 FM) licensed to serve Cleveland, Tennessee, United States
- WZNO-LP, a low-power radio station (107.3 FM) licensed to serve Cleveland, Tennessee, which held the call sign WTNE-LP in 2017
- WPOT, a radio station (1500 AM) licensed to serve Trenton, Tennessee, which held the call sign WTNE until 2014
- WYJJ (FM), a radio station (97.7 FM) licensed to serve Trenton, Tennessee, which held the call sign WTNE-FM from 2000 to 2009
