= WTJF =

WTJF may refer to:

- WTJF (AM), a radio station (1390 AM) licensed to serve Jackson, Tennessee, United States
- WTJF-FM, a radio station (94.3 FM) licensed to serve Dyer, Tennessee
