= WEGI =

WEGI may refer to:

- WEGI-LP, a low-power radio station (103.5 FM) licensed to serve Immokalee, Florida, United States
- WQEZ, a radio station (1370 AM) licensed to Fort Campbell, Kentucky, United States, which held the call sign WEGI from 2009 to 2013
- WRND, a radio station (94.3 FM) licensed to Oak Grove, Kentucky, which held the call signs WEGI and WEGI-FM from 2004 to 2013
