= WKFN =

Radio station in Clarksville, Tennessee

Coordinates: 36°32′31.2″N 87°19′32″W

- Clarksville, Tennessee; United States
- Frequency: 540 kHz
- Branding: ESPN Clarksville

Programming
- Format: Sports
- Affiliations: ESPN Radio

Ownership
- Owner: Saga Communications; (Saga Communications of Tuckessee, LLC)
- Sister stations: WCVQ; WNZE; WQEZ; WRND; WVVR; WZZP

History
- First air date: November 12, 1954 (as WDXN)
- Former call signs: WDXN (1954–2001)
- Call sign meaning: W K FaN (former branding)

Technical information
- Licensing authority: FCC
- Facility ID: 65202
- Class: D
- Power: 4,000 watts day; 55 watts night
- Translator: 104.1 W281BT (Clarksville)

Links
- Public license information: Public file; LMS
- Webcast: Listen Live
- Website: WKFN Online

WKFN (540 AM, "ESPN Clarksville") is a radio station broadcasting a sports format in Clarksville, Tennessee, United States as an affiliate of ESPN Radio. The station is owned by Saga Communications, and operates as part of its Five Star Media Group with its main offices in Clarksville.

== History ==
WKFN had its beginnings as WDXN AM which stood for Dixie Network, the original owner. The Dixie Network was based in Jackson, Tennessee where it operated WDXI/1310 and WDXI-TV/7. They also owned WENK, Union City, Tennessee and WTPR AM/-FM, Paris, Tennessee. WTPR-FM is now WAKQ. Dixie also owned WDXE, Lawrenceburg, Tennessee and another AM station in Corinth, Mississippi.

The network was operated by Aaron B. Robinson. Upon his death in 1961, the stations were held in trust by a bank in Jackson which was to decide if Aaron Robinson Jr. should inherit them. The bank eventually deemed that he should not and the stations all were sold, and the operations of the network wound up, in 1973.

The Dixie Radio Network had six stations, three of which had call letters which contained the letters WDX: WDXE Lawrenceburg and WDXI Jackson were sister stations to WDXN. All these stations were primarily "daytimers" until 1986 when deregulation allowed broadcasting past sundown and then began broadcasting 24 hours a day.

At one time WDXN was owned by Jack Mayer of Clarksville, who was the long-time secretary of the Tennessee Association of Broadcasters.

On February 1, 2001, the station was acquired by Saga Communications of Tuckessee, Inc., who in the same year, changed the call letters to the current WKFN.
