= WDXI =

Radio station in Jackson, Tennessee

- Jackson, Tennessee; United States
- Frequency: 1310 kHz
- Branding: Talk-N West TN Sports

Programming
- Format: Sports
- Affiliations: Fox Sports Radio

Ownership
- Owner: Golden Media Group Inc.
- Sister stations: WBFG, WNWS-FM

History
- First air date: October 31, 1948

Technical information
- Licensing authority: FCC
- Facility ID: 37244
- Class: D
- Power: 5,000 watts day; 50 watts night
- Transmitter coordinates: 35°39′50.00″N 88°49′20.00″W
- Translator: 103.5 W278CL (Jackson)

Links
- Public license information: Public file; LMS
- Webcast: Listen live
- Website: www.fsrjackson.com

WDXI (1310 AM, "Talk-N West TN Sports" is a radio station in Jackson, Tennessee, United States. It broadcasts a Sports format, The station is currently owned by Golden Media Group

Established in 1948, WDXI was the key station in the regional Dixie Network station group, owned by Aaron Robinson. Robinson also established the city's first television station, WDXI-TV (now WBBJ-TV), in 1955. After Robinson's death, his estate ran WDXI for a decade before it was sold. Long a country music station, it switched in the early 1990s to a news/talk format.

WDXI fell silent in February 2022, owing to damage to its transmission line and antenna tuning system. It has since been fixed and returned to air.

WDXI switched formats from oldies as "Kool 103.5" to Talk radio as "News Talk 103.5" at midnight on September 16, 2024 expanding coverage to cover more of Jackson & West tn with sister station WBFG-FM "News Talk 96.5".

WDXI switched formats from talk as “Talk N West TN” to Sports as “Talk N Sports West TN” on Monday, May 12, 2025 at midnight carrying Fox Sports programming 24/7. Fox sports programming was originally on WTJK 105.3 in Humboldt/Jackson, Tennessee that’s now moved to WDXI 1310 & 103.5 Fox sports Jackson.

== History ==
On June 3, 1947, Aaron B. Robinson, trading as the Dixie Broadcasting Company, filed with the Federal Communications Commission to build a new daytime-only radio station in Jackson. Robinson had previously worked from 1943 to 1946 at WTJS, the station of The Jackson Sun, and already had built WCMA in Corinth, Mississippi, and WENK in Union City. Originally specifying 930 kHz, the application was amended to 1310 kHz before being approved on April 29, 1948. From interim studios on North Market Street and a transmitter north of town, WDXI debuted on October 31. The station planned to affiliate with the Dixie Network, an operation owned by Robinson, and Mutual Broadcasting System, but it did not do so at launch because it wanted to wait until the FCC granted its application to begin nighttime broadcasts, which also included a daytime increase to 5,000 watts. These changes took effect in July 1949, by which time WDXI had moved into permanent studio quarters in the newly completed Williams Building at Lafayette and Highland streets the preceding March. The studios featured an auditorium with seating for 200. After buying out and shutting down Jackson station WPLI in 1953, Robinson would bring television to Jackson in 1955 with the establishment of WDXI-TV, a CBS/ABC affiliate on channel 7.

Robinson died of a heart attack in 1961 at the age of 55. His estate sold WDXI-TV to Bahakel Broadcasting in 1966, at which time it was renamed WBBJ-TV.

The Williams Building was heavily damaged by fire on the morning of January 21, 1972, beginning in the WDXI suite on the third floor, which completely collapsed. The last person in the building before the blaze broke out was a WDXI announcer who had stayed late; the studios were completely destroyed, and within a week the wrecking ball had come to demolish the structure. WDXI had already been contemplating new offices at its transmitter site at the time of the fire, and it engaged architects for a possible office site on Airways Boulevard in the wake of the blaze, but it first set up shop in the New Southern Building. WTJS donated records, while WJAK loaned the use of its facilities to allow the station to produce commercials. That same year, an anniversary edition of the Sun noted that a reference to "Dixie" in Jackson had a "50–50 chance" of being about WDXI, not the South.

In 1973, WDXI was sold to Community Service Broadcasting of Mount Vernon, Illinois. Instead of facilities on Airways, the firm commissioned a studio and office building at the transmitter site, which was completed in February 1975. By that time, it was broadcasting a country format. Community Service expanded in Jackson by purchasing WJHR (103.1 FM) at the end of 1982; Community Service had applied for the frequency but lost out to another group. It then sold its broadcast properties to CR Broadcasting in 1987 for $4 million; CR set up corporate headquarters in Jackson and relaunched the FM station, then hits-formatted WRJX, as adult contemporary WMXX-FM. It also experimented with converting the station to an all-Elvis Presley format during the day from November 1988 to May 1989.

The Glassman brothers, owners of Community Service Broadcasting, opted to buy back CR Broadcasting's stations in 1992; by that time, WDXI had converted from country music to a news/talk format. However, the Jackson stations were sold later that year to Gerald Wayne Hunt, Sr., of Pickwick Dam. WDXI was new but the FM was not; he had been part of the consortium that put WMXX on the air as WJHR in 1979. WDXI aired programming from the Business Radio Network, based in Colorado Springs, Colorado, and NBC Talknet. The business and sports format for WDXI continued untouched for nearly 25 years, as did WMXX, which Hunt flipped to oldies. WDXI had one local show by 2013, a Saturday morning sports talk show.

In 2017, WDXI launched an FM translator, W279AZ (103.7 FM) (now W278CL at 103.5), and revamped its programming to feature conservative talk including The Rush Limbaugh Show and The Sean Hannity Show and a local morning show, as well as existing coverage of St. Louis Cardinals baseball. By 2022, when the station was taken silent, Hunt Sr. had suffered several strokes and other medical complications and was reported to be in a long-term care facility.

On May 12, 2025, WDXI rebranded as "Talk-N West TN Sports".
