= WYJJ =

WYJJ may refer to:

- WYJJ (FM), a radio station (97.7 FM) licensed to serve Trenton, Tennessee, United States
- WYJJ-LD, a low-power television station (channel 34, virtual 27) licensed to serve Jackson, Tennessee
