= WOWQ =

WOWQ may refer to:

- WOWQ (FM), a radio station (101.7 FM) licensed to serve Central City, Pennsylvania, United States
- WJZM, a radio station (105.1 FM) licensed to serve Waverly, Tennessee, United States, which held the call sign WOWQ from 2021 to 2022
- WIFT, a radio station (102.1 FM) licensed to serve Du Bois, Pennsylvania, which held the call sign WOWQ from 1981 to 2000 and from 2002 to 2017
