= WHPP =

WHPP may refer to:

- WRDF, a radio station (106.3 FM) licensed to Columbia City, Indiana, which held the call sign WHPP from 2011 to 2014
- WTJK, a radio station (105.3 FM) licensed to Humboldt, Tennessee, which held the call sign WHPP from 2014 to 2018
