= WKBL =

WKBL may refer to:

- Women's Korean Basketball League
- WKBL (AM), a radio station (1250 AM) licensed to Covington, Tennessee, United States
