= WDVW =

WDVW may refer to:

- WTJK, a radio station (105.3 FM) licensed to serve Humboldt, Tennessee, United States, which held the call sign WDVW from 2012 to 2014
- WZRH, a radio station (92.3 FM) licensed to serve Laplace, Louisiana, United States, which held the call sign WDVW from 2004 to 2010
