= WTJN-LP =

Troy, Ohio; United States
- Broadcast area: Troy and nearby communities
- Frequency: 107.1 MHz
- Branding: POWER 107.1 FM

Programming
- Format: Variety

Ownership
- Owner: Troy Community FM

History
- First air date: February 14, 2014 (with original callsign WTJW-LP)
- Call sign meaning: TroJaN

Technical information
- Licensing authority: FCC
- Class: L1 (Low-power FM)
- ERP: 100 watts
- Transmitter coordinates: 40°02′28″N 84°12′17″W

Links
- Public license information: LMS
- Webcast: Listen Live
- Website: power1071.org

WTJN "The New 107.1" is a low-power FM broadcasting station licensed to, located in and serving the city of Troy, Ohio and nearby communities of Tipp City, Casstown, Fletcher and Covington.

== Brief history ==
Troy Community Radio began initially as a webcaster in September 2012 by Scott Hornberger in the spare bedroom of his home. It briefly broadcast as a micropower radio service at 94.1 in the latter part of 2012 before a new "filing window" (the second of its kind) was announced by the Federal Communications Commission (FCC) to allow applications for new low power FM stations. The window was opened in the fall of 2013 and the owner promptly applied for a low-power FM license. The application and license was granted on February 13, 2014 with the callsign WTJW-LP. Scott Hornberger is a 1988 graduate of Troy High School.

Troy had had its own FM broadcasting station WTRJ at 96.9 MHz in 1991 but the station changed formats, ownerships and callsigns several times and eventually moving its local base and studio to Dayton as WRNB, a classic soul format before being sold to EMF Broadcasting becoming WOKL, a local affiliate of K-LOVE. It is now WYDA an affiliate of EMF-owned sister network Air 1.

On March 6, 2014, the callsign changed from WTJW-LP to WTJN-LP to better coincide with the callsign meaning TroJaN, a reference to the Troy High School Trojans athletic teams and the local residents who proudly call themselves "Trojans."

In August 2020, WTJN was re-branded as "POWER 107.1 FM..EmPOWERing Local Non-Profit Organizations. The station applied for and was granted 501c3 status.

== Programming ==
The former Troy Community Radio (TCR), now POWER 107.1, airs a mix of popular music from the 1960s to the present with local high school sports coverage. The Dayton Daily News featured a story of the launch of WTJN (dated April 3, 2014) as did the Troy Daily News.

== Callsign history ==
The WTJW callsign had been used as the callsign of an FM station in Humboldt, Tennessee. It is now WTJK.

The WTJN callsign is also used as the name of a non-broadcasting webcaster in Jacksonville, Florida with an Eclectic rock format.

== See also ==
- Low-power FM
- Community radio
- Dayton Daily News article of WTJN's beginnings.
- Troy Daily News story from TDN-Net website.
