= WJPJ =

- Humboldt, Tennessee; United States
- Broadcast area: Jackson, Tennessee
- Frequency: 1190 kHz
- Branding: La Poderosa 99.9 FM & 1190 AM

Programming
- Language: Spanish
- Format: Regional Mexican

Ownership
- Owner: Grace Media Group Inc.
- Sister stations: WTJK, WTJS (FM), WNWS-FM

History
- First air date: July 6, 1972; 54 years ago
- Former call signs: WHMT (1972–2006); WLLI (2006–2010); WHUN (2010–2012)

Technical information
- Licensing authority: FCC
- Facility ID: 6582
- Class: D
- Power: 420 watts day
- Transmitter coordinates: 35°50′41″N 88°54′08″W
- Translator: 99.9 W260BA (Clarksburg)

Links
- Public license information: Public file; LMS

WJPJ (1190 AM, "La Poderosa 99.9 WJPJ") is a Spanish radio station licensed to serve Humboldt, Tennessee. The station's broadcast license is held by Palmer Johnson, Inc.

== History ==
=== WHMT ===
On March 30, 1972, Communications Associates, Inc., obtained a construction permit to build a new radio station in Humboldt on 1190 kHz. WHMT began with a country music format on July 6, 1972. Donald Stephenson became the sole owner at the end of 1975, retaining the country format. After the umbrella company for Stephenson's interests, Crestline Financial, entered into difficulties in 1982, it sold WHMT to RB Management Corporation, owned by the Boyd family.

In October 1988, station management filed a petition with the FCC to reduce their broadcast power from 500 to 420 watts and increase the height of their broadcast antenna. This move would allow the station to cover the same geographic area with lower electricity costs. The FCC granted the station a construction permit for these changes on January 10, 1989, with a scheduled expiration date of July 10, 1990. However, construction was completed before the end of January 1989, and WHMT applied for a new broadcast license to cover these changes. The FCC granted the station the revised license on August 22, 1989.

Under Boyd, WHMT shifted to oldies before returning to Christian country music in 1993. This was replaced with sports talk in 1997.

=== WLLI ===
In April 2006, Boyd Enterprises, Inc., reached an agreement to sell WHMT and sister stations WLSZ and WLSQ-FM to Forever Communications, Inc., subsidiary Forever South Licenses, LLC, for a combined sale price of $1.3 million. In addition, Boyd Enterprises would receive $80,000 per year for 10 years in return for agreeing to a non-compete clause. The FCC approved the sale on June 7, 2006, and the deal was formally consummated on July 31, 2006. The new owners had the FCC assign the station call sign "WLLI" on November 1, 2006, to match the "Willie 1190" branding of the station's new classic country music format.

On November 16, 2009, WLLI's signal went dark for financial reasons, with the license holder asserting that the station's expenses "far out weigh the very little revenue it generates". Predicting a lengthy shutdown, the station applied to the FCC for special temporary authority to remain silent. This authority was granted on November 20, 2009, with a scheduled expiration of May 19, 2010. The local programming aired on WLLI was moved to co-owned WTJJ (94.3 FM).

=== WHUN ===
The station swapped call signs with Forever Communications-owned WHUN in Huntingdon, Pennsylvania, on February 8, 2010. The Pennsylvania station began carrying its own "Willie" format, while the Tennessee station sat silent and seeking new ownership.

Citing the financial effects of the late-2000s recession, in July 2010, Forever South Licenses, LLC, contracted to donate the WHUN broadcast license to the nonprofit organization Joy Christian Communications, Inc. The FCC approved the transfer on September 3, 2010, and the deal was formally consummated on September 13, 2010. The station resumed normal broadcast operations on August 26, 2010, with new owners, a new call sign, and a new gospel music format.

However, Joy Christian Communications' tenure as owner of WHUN was short-lived as in June 2011 they agreed to sell the station to Palmer Johnson, Inc., a company "100% owned" by Emry Palmer "P.J." Johnson, for a total price of $10,000. The sale was approved by the FCC on December 1, 2011, and as of December 10, 2011, is awaiting formal consummation. Johnson also owns WTRB (1570 AM) in Ripley, Tennessee.

With the sale nearing completion, WHUN management notified the FCC on November 8, 2011, that the station would be signing off temporarily for financial reasons starting December 1, 2011, and sought special temporary authority to remain silent. The FCC granted this authority on November 30, 2011, with a scheduled expiration of May 28, 2012.

=== WJPJ ===
After being sold to Palmer Johnson, Inc. on June 1, 2012, the station changed call signs once again, taking on the identifier "WJPJ". The WHMT call sign had been sought, but it was already in use at a station in Tullahoma.

In August 2012 WJPJ returned to the air under the new ownership with a classic hits format. An FM translator, W260BA (99.9 FM), was added in 2016.

On April 20, 2018, WJPJ changed formats from classic hits to Christian radio, branded as "Good News Radio".

On November 1, 2020, WJPJ flipped to country. This came after an earlier attempt to join a regional news-talk network based at WTJS (93.1 FM).

On September 14, 2022, WJPJ changed its format from country to sports, branded as "Fox Sports Jackson".

On April 8, 2024, WJPJ flipped formats from Sports to Regional Mexican "La Poderosa 99.9 FM & 1190 AM." Fox sports that was on 99.9 fm & 1190 AM has moved back to its original frequency on 105.3 WTJK.

In March 2024, Palmer Johnson, Inc. donated WJPJ to Grace Broadcasting Services, Inc., which operates multiple radio stations in the Jackson, Tennessee, market. The FCC subsequently granted the assig2nment of the station's license to Grace Broadcasting Services on May 31, 2024.
