= WTGP =

WTGP may refer to:

- WTGP-LP, a low-power radio station (99.9 FM) licensed to serve Pikeville, Tennessee, United States
- WYJJ (FM), a radio station (97.7 FM) licensed to serve Trenton, Tennessee, which held the call sign WTGP from 2009 to 2012
