= WMXX =

WMXX may refer to:

- WMXX-FM, a radio station (103.1 FM) licensed to Jackson, Tennessee, United States
- WrestleMania XX, the 20th professional wrestling WrestleMania pay-per-view by World Wrestling Entertainment (WWE)
- WWXM, a radio station (97.7 FM) licensed to serve Georgetown, South Carolina, which held the call sign WMXX from 1985 to 1986
