= Troy, Ohio =

City and county seat of Miami County, Ohio

- City
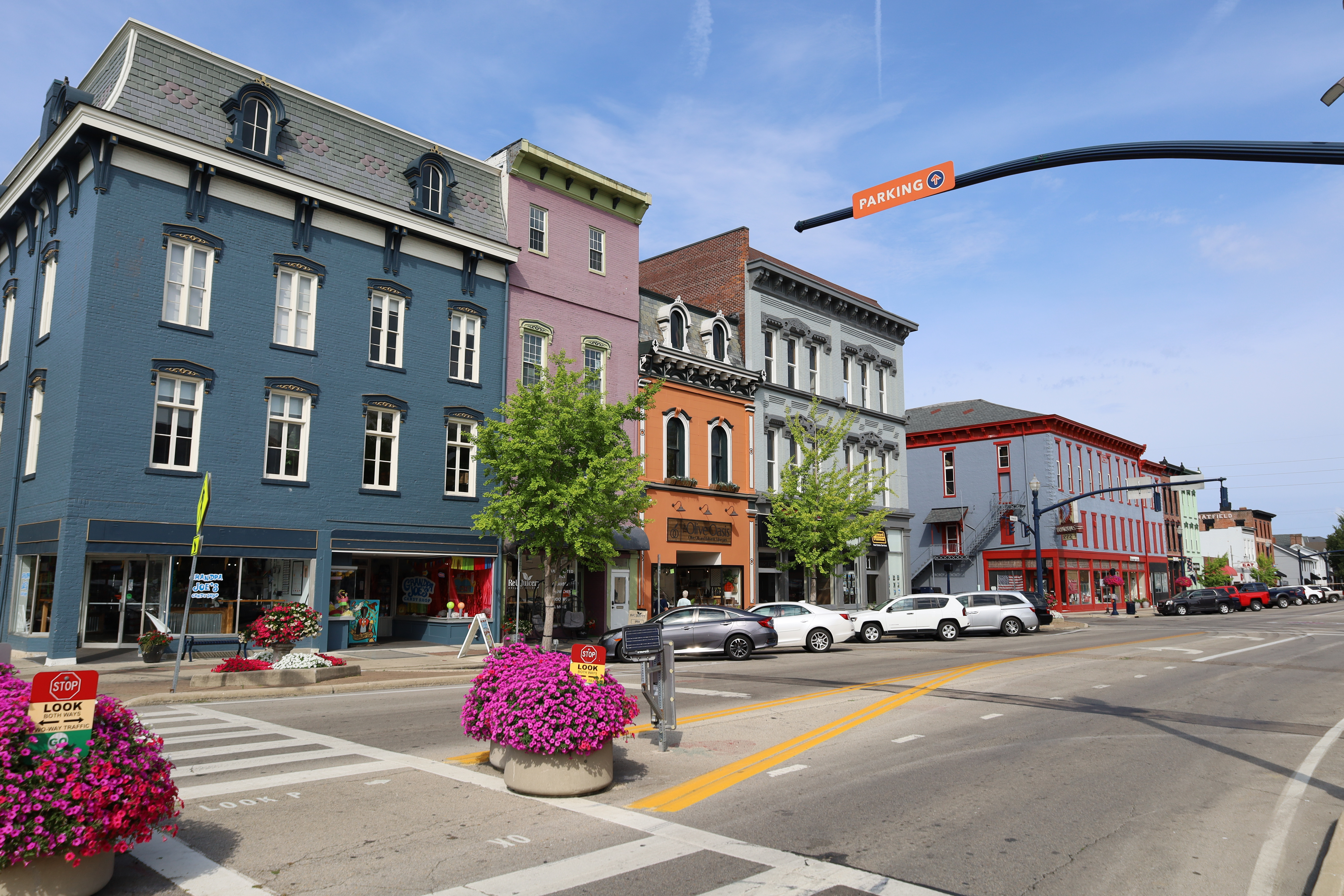
- Buildings along Main Street in Troy Public Square in 2023
- Nickname: Trojan city
- Motto: "Make It Yours"
- Interactive map of Troy, Ohio
- Location within Ohio Location within the United States
- Coordinates: 40°02′39″N 84°14′10″W
- Country: United States
- State: Ohio
- County: Miami

Government
  - Mayor: Robin Oda (R)

Area
  - Total: 12.43 sq mi (32.19 km^{2})
  - Land: 12.21 sq mi (31.62 km^{2})
  - Water: 0.22 sq mi (0.56 km^{2})
- Elevation: 853 ft (260 m)

Population (2020)
  - Total: 26,305
  - Density: 2,154.3/sq mi (831.79/km^{2})
- Time zone: UTC-5 (Eastern (EST))
  - Summer (DST): UTC-4 (EDT)
- ZIP codes: 45373-45374
- Area codes: 937, 326
- FIPS code: 39-77588
- GNIS feature ID: 2397060
- Website: troyohio.gov

Troy is a city in and the county seat of Miami County, Ohio, United States. The population was 26,305 at the 2020 census, making it Miami County's largest city and Ohio's 55th-largest. Troy lies along the Great Miami River about 19 miles (31 km) north of Dayton and is part of the Dayton metropolitan area.

== History ==
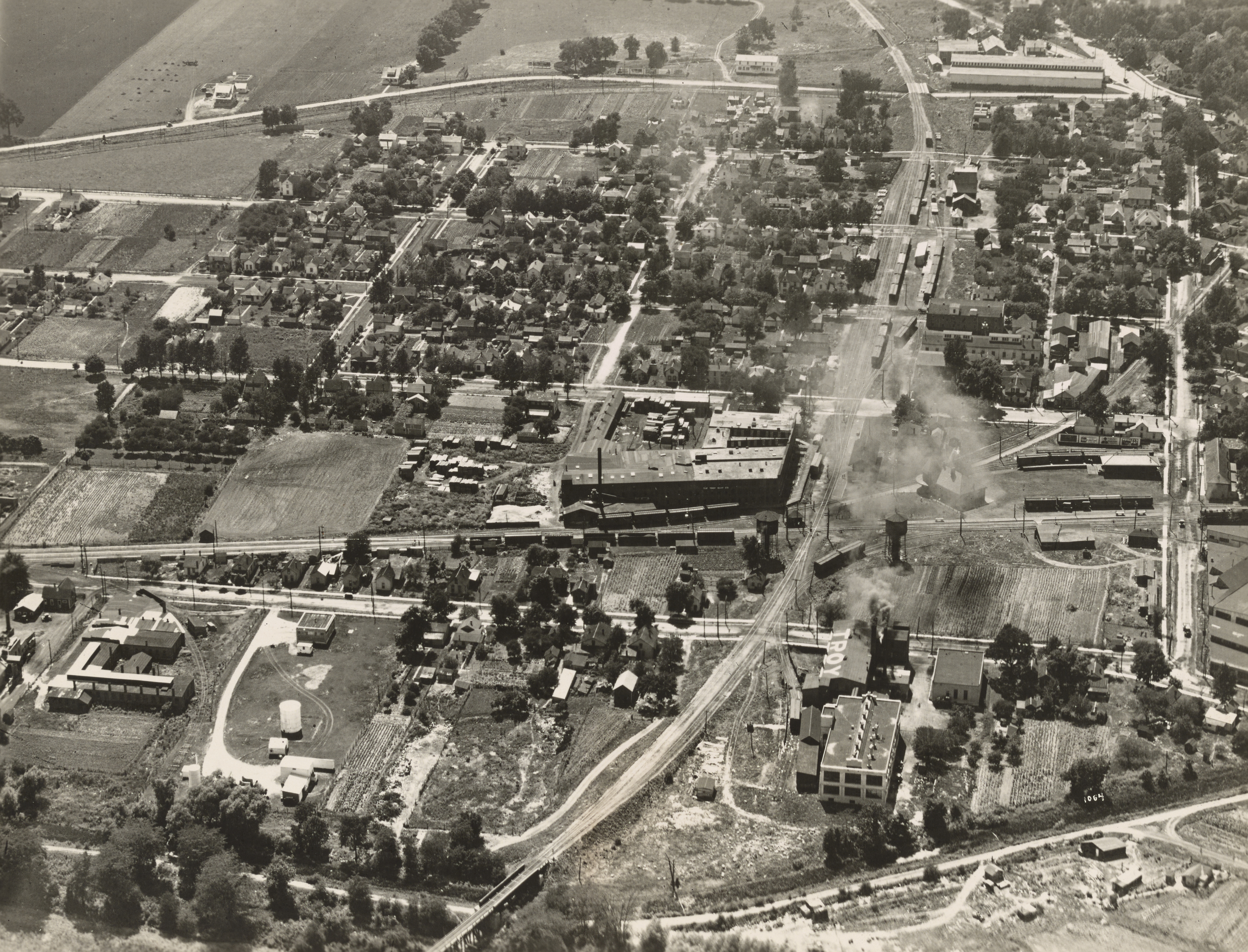
Troy in the 1920s

Troy was platted around 1807. A post office in Troy has been in operation since 1824.

Troy was one of the cities affected by severe flooding in the Great Flood of 1913.

In 1970, the Troy Historical Society published Troy: The Nineteenth Century, a book on Troy's history by Thomas Bemis Wheeler. The book discusses the city's founding city and the Ohio canal era of the 1800s.

== Geography ==
According to the United States Census Bureau, the city has an area of 11.94 square miles (30.92 km^{2}), of which 11.72 square miles (30.35 km^{2}) is land and 0.22 square miles (0.57 km^{2}) is water.

== Demographics ==
Historical population
Census	Pop.	Note	%±
1810	179		—
1820	293		63.7%
1830	504		72.0%
1840	1,351		168.1%
1850	1,956		44.8%
1860	2,643		35.1%
1870	3,005		13.7%
1880	3,803		26.6%
1890	4,494		18.2%
1900	5,881		30.9%
1910	6,122		4.1%
1920	7,260		18.6%
1930	8,675		19.5%
1940	9,697		11.8%
1950	10,661		9.9%
1960	13,685		28.4%
1970	17,186		25.6%
1980	19,008		10.6%
1990	19,478		2.5%
2000	21,999		12.9%
2010	25,058		13.9%
2020	26,305		5.0%
2025 (est.)	27,344		3.9%

=== 2020 census ===
As of the 2020 census, Troy had a population of 26,305 and a median age of 38.6 years; 23.7% of residents were under the age of 18 and 16.8% of residents were 65 years of age or older. For every 100 females there were 95.1 males, and for every 100 females age 18 and over there were 92.5 males age 18 and over.

99.4% of residents lived in urban areas, while 0.6% lived in rural areas.

There were 11,197 households in Troy, of which 29.4% had children under the age of 18 living in them. Of all households, 43.3% were married-couple households, 19.6% were households with a male householder and no spouse or partner present, and 29.1% were households with a female householder and no spouse or partner present. About 32.0% of all households were made up of individuals and 12.4% had someone living alone who was 65 years of age or older.

There were 11,859 housing units, of which 5.6% were vacant. The homeowner vacancy rate was 1.1% and the rental vacancy rate was 6.2%.

Racial composition as of the 2020 census
Race	Number	Percent
White	22,457	85.4%
Black or African American	1,082	4.1%
American Indian and Alaska Native	39	0.1%
Asian	797	3.0%
Native Hawaiian and Other Pacific Islander	4	0.0%
Some other race	320	1.2%
Two or more races	1,606	6.1%
Hispanic or Latino (of any race)	668	2.5%

=== 2010 census ===
As of the census of 2010, there were 25,058 people, 10,353 households, and 6,600 families residing in the city. The population density was 2,138.1 inhabitants per square mile (825.5/km^{2}). There were 11,166 housing units at an average density of 952.7 per square mile (367.8/km^{2}). The racial makeup of the city was 90.1% White, 4.2% African American, 0.2% Native American, 2.4% Asian, 0.6% from other races, and 2.4% from two or more races. Hispanic or Latino people of any race were 1.8% of the population.

There were 10,353 households, of which 33.1% had children under the age of 18 living with them, 46.1% were married couples living together, 12.9% had a female householder with no husband present, 4.7% had a male householder with no wife present, and 36.3% were non-families. 30.5% of all households were made up of individuals, and 10.6% had someone living alone who was 65 years of age or older. The average household size was 2.38 and the average family size was 2.95.

The median age in the city was 36.9 years. 25.2% of residents were under the age of 18; 7.9% were between the ages of 18 and 24; 28.1% were from 25 to 44; 25.7% were from 45 to 64; and 13.1% were 65 years of age or older. The gender makeup of the city was 48.7% male and 51.3% female.

=== 2000 census ===
As of 2000 the median income for a household in the city was $39,531, and the median income for a family was $46,889. Males had a median income of $35,819 versus $25,536 for females. The per capita income for the city was $19,892. About 6.4% of families and 8.2% of the population were below the poverty line, including 10.8% of those under age 18 and 6.4% of those age 65 or over.

== Arts and culture ==
Troy is home to the Troy-Hayner Cultural Center, a 1914 Romanesque mansion donated to the city by Mary Jane Harter Coleman Hayner. Hayner had been married to William Hayner, founder of a Dayton-based mail-order whiskey business that operated before Prohibition. The Troy-Hayner houses the Hayner Distillery Collection and a variety of works by local artists.

=== Historic sites ===
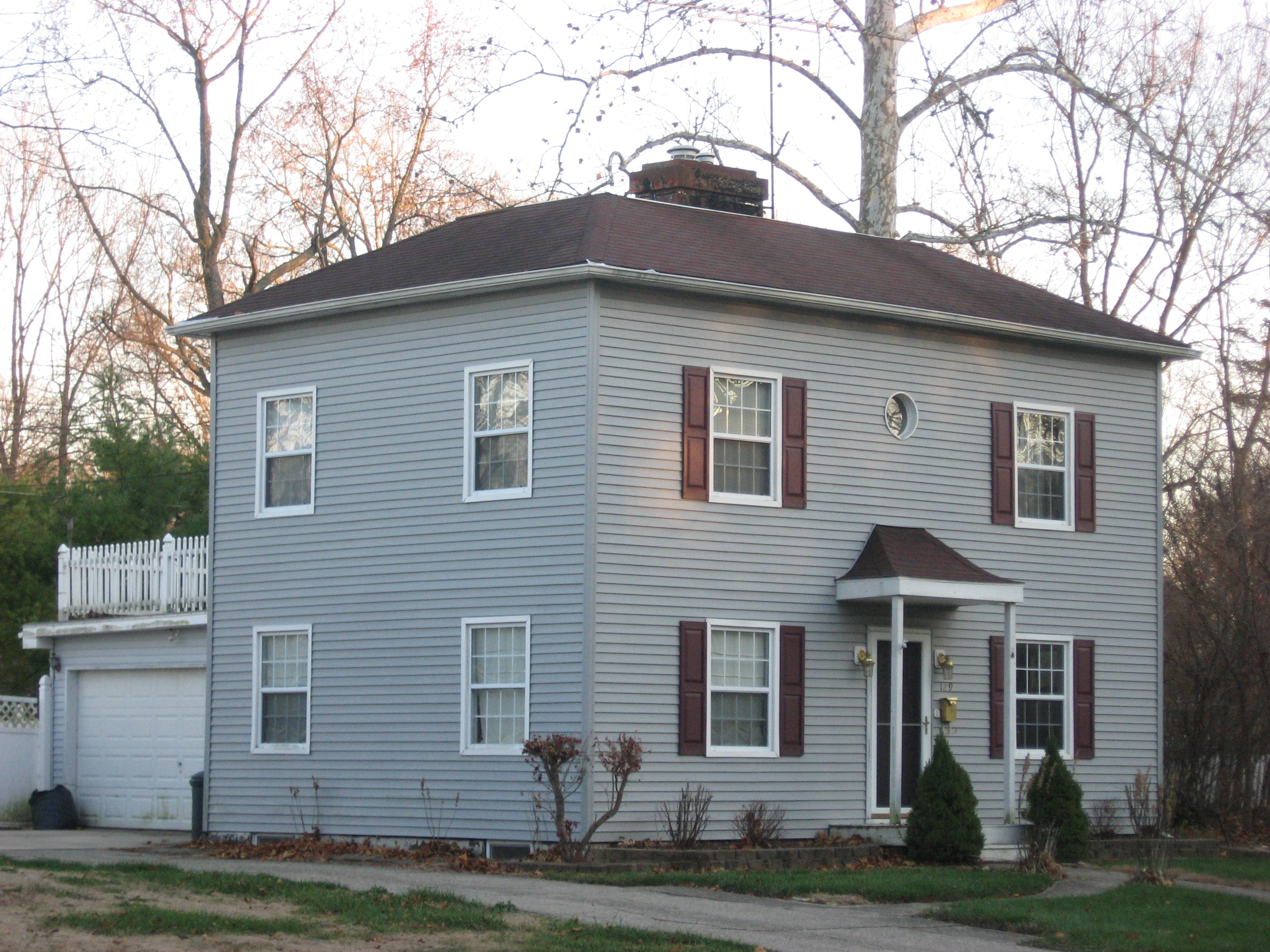
A surviving welded steel house

Troy was the location of the Hobart Welded Steel House Company, which might have become influential in U.S. housing if prefabricated houses had become popular after World War II. The firm's homes resemble the better-known Lustron houses of the Columbus, Ohio-based Lustron Corporation (which also failed). Hobart manufactured and built 22 homes, all in Troy, 16 of which survive and are listed on the U.S. National Register of Historic Places.

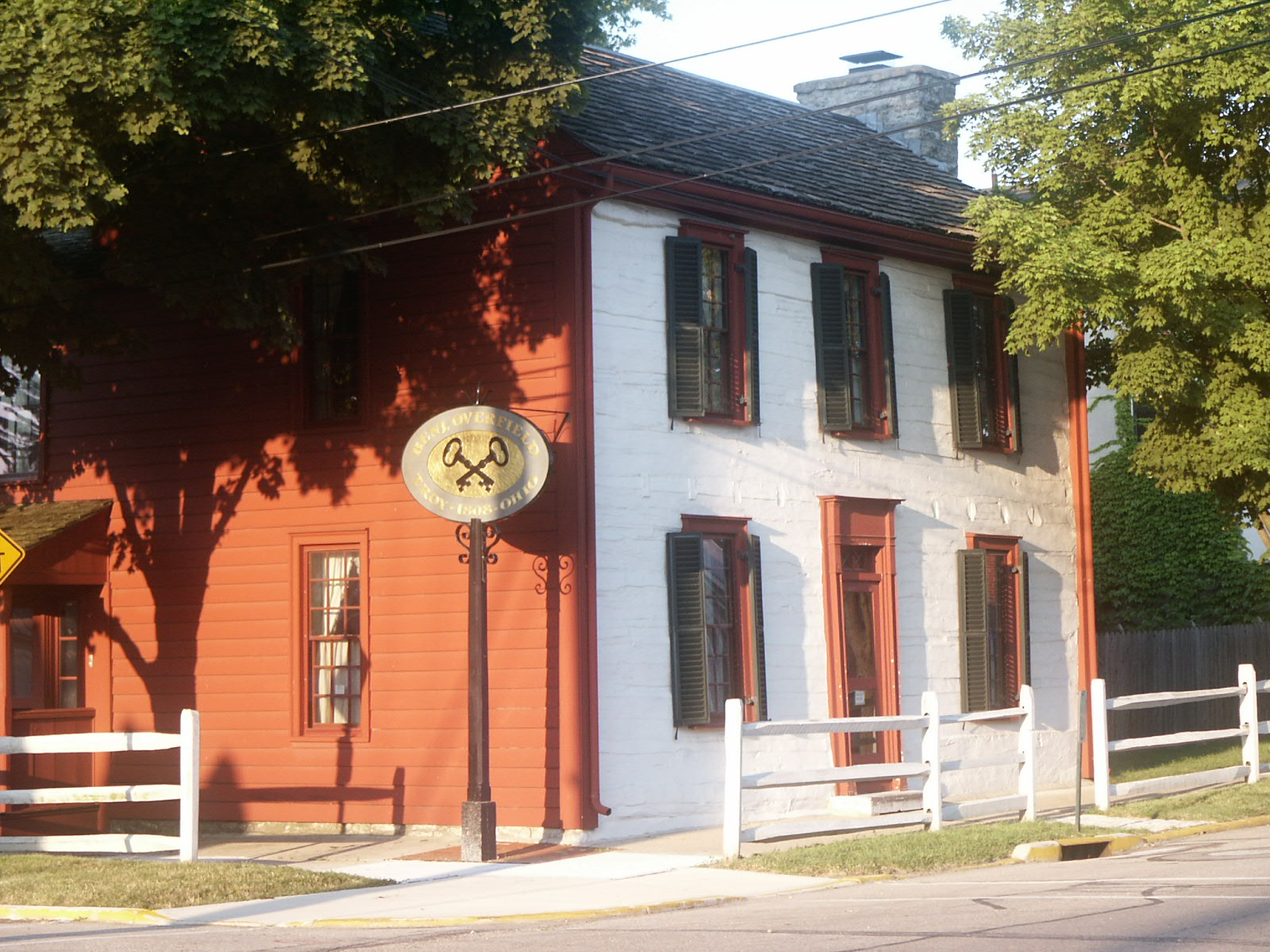
1808 Overfield Tavern, one of Ohio's oldest taverns, now a museum

Other NRHP-listed properties in Troy include four unrelated homes, a tavern, the Miami County Courthouse and Power Station, the 1859 First Presbyterian Church, and the Troy Public Square.

== Government ==
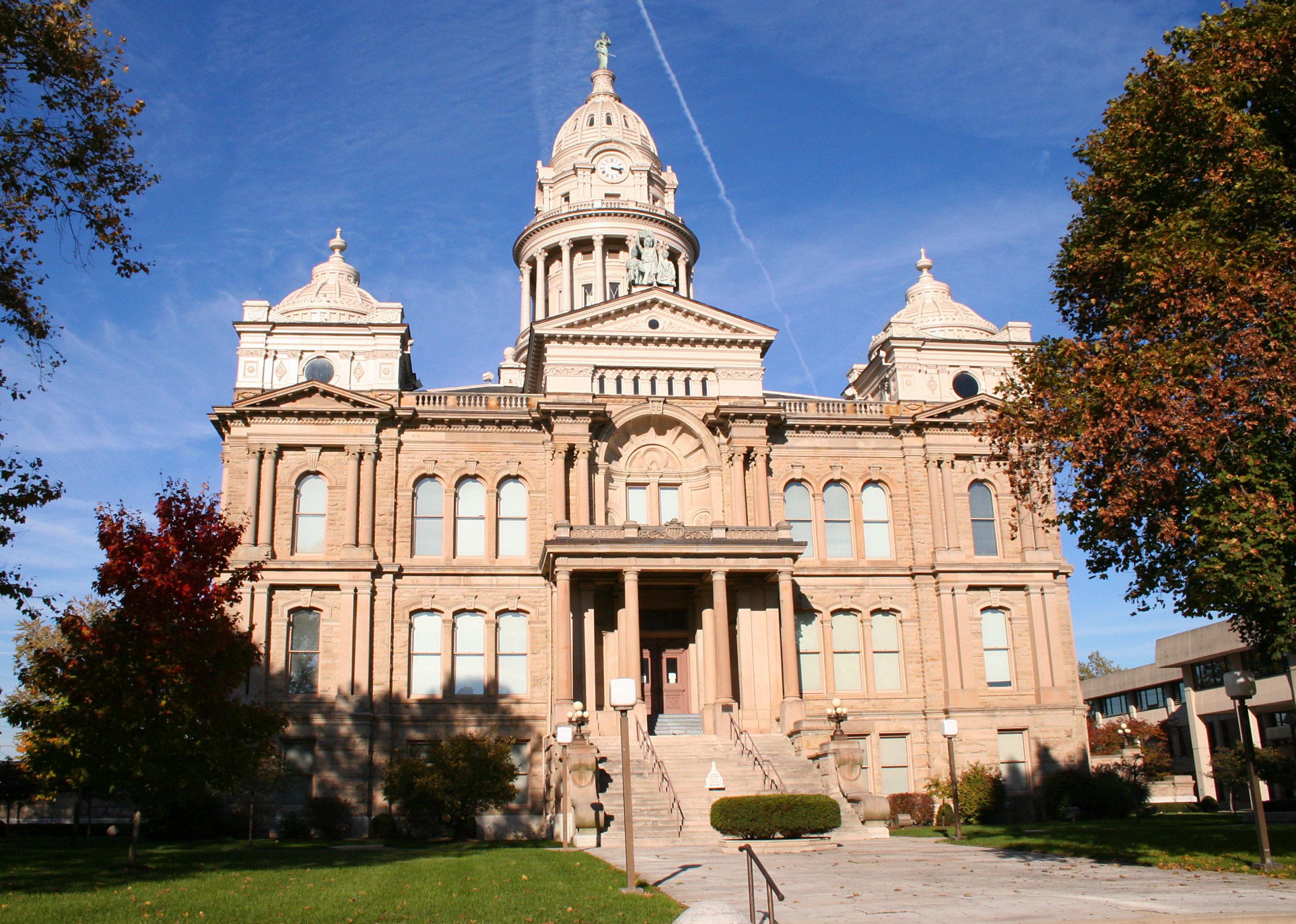
Miami County courthouse

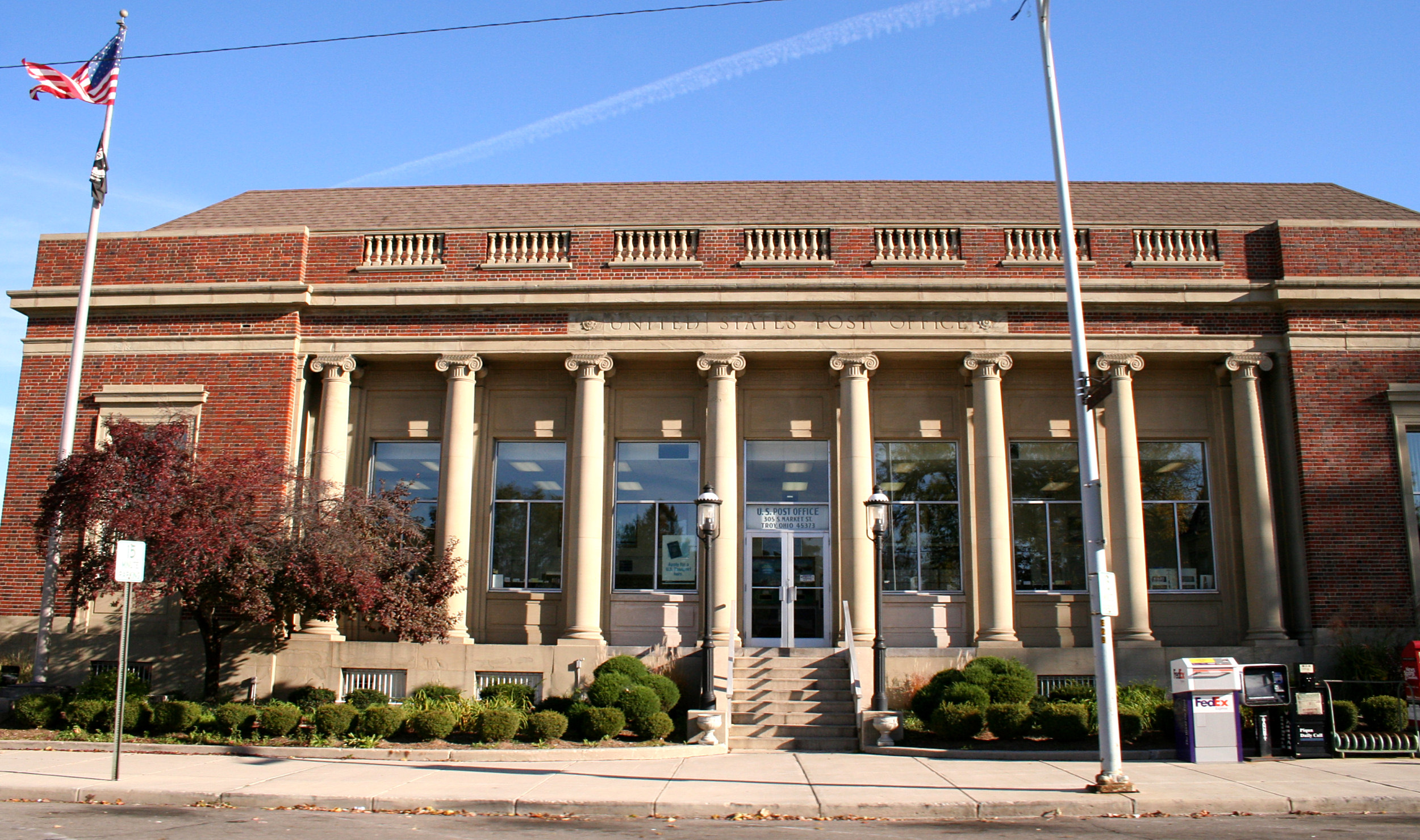
Post office

The City of Troy has a statutory form of government, as described in Ohio Revised Code Sections 731 and 733. General statutory law is the form of municipal government if the electorate has not adopted, by vote, one of the other forms. In addition to a council, the electorate chooses a mayor, council president, and three principal administrators (auditor, treasurer, and solicitor). The mayor administers the city's daily operations. Troy also has a service and safety director who reports to and is appointed by the mayor.

The mayor, auditor and law director are elected to four-year terms. The city council is elected to two-year terms in odd-numbered years. The electorate selects the council president, three at-large representatives, and ward representatives 1 through 6. The current mayor and auditor were elected in 2019 and the city council and treasurer were elected in 2021.

The Troy City Police Department is at 124 E. Main Street. It has 38 officers and three civilian employees. The department has three divisions: patrol, detective, and administration. Shawn McKinney is the police chief. The department moved to its current location in 1995.

The Troy Fire Department was established in 1850 when the Troy Hook & Ladder Company and the Troy Bucket Company were organized. The Fire Department of Troy was formally organized in the fall of 1857. The department has three fire stations, 37 firefighter/paramedics, a training lieutenant, 2 assistant chiefs and a fire chief, Matthew D. Simmons. The fire department provides a full complement of services to its citizens with fire/EMS/Community outreach/ specialty rescue services. The Troy Fire Department serves 74.2 square miles with the city and three townships averaging over 5,000 incidents a year.

== Education ==
Troy City Schools operates public schools covering most of the city limits.

Schools in Troy
School	Type	Grades	Founded
Troy High School	Public	9–12	1852
Troy Junior High School	Public	7–8	1972
Troy Christian High School	Private	Pre-K–12	1980
Miami Montessori School	Private	Pre-K–6	1979
The Overfield School	Private	18 months–K	1960
Van Cleve Elementary	Public	6	1914
Concord Elementary	Public	K–6	1919
Cookson Elementary	Public	K–5	1963
Forest Elementary	Public	K–5	1949
Heywood Elementary	Public	K–5	1931
Hook Elementary	Public	K–5	1967
Kyle Elementary	Public	K–5	1950
St. Patrick School	Private	K–8	1888

A part of Troy is in Miami East Local School District.

Troy is home to the Hobart Institute of Welding Technology, founded in 1930.

The Western Ohio Japanese Language School (オハイオ西部日本語学校 Ohaio Seibu Nihongo Gakkō) is a supplementary weekend Japanese school in unincorporated Miami County, near Troy. It started in April 1988.

The Troy-Miami County Public Library has three locations in Troy: the main Troy Library, The Local History Library, and the Maker Lab.

== Media ==
The city and surrounding area are served by a daily newspaper based in Troy, Miami Valley Today; the radio station WTJN-LP "POWER 107.1" 107.1 FM; and the magazine Troy Living.

== Notable people ==
- Ryan Brewer, college football player
- Cris Carter, NFL player
- Nancy J. Currie, engineer, U.S. Army officer, NASA astronaut
- Pat Darcy, Major League Baseball player
- Warren Davidson, U.S. representative from Ohio
- Kris Dielman, NFL player
- Bob Ferguson, NFL player
- Mike Finnigan, keyboard player and vocalist
- Wesley Henderson, architect
- Jack Hewitt, driver and two-time champion in the USAC Silver Crown Series
- Tolbert Lanston, founder of Monotype
- Miss May I, metalcore band
- Richmond Mayo-Smith, economist
- Roger A. McGuire, U.S. Ambassador to Guinea-Bissau
- Sam Milby, Filipino actor
- Heath Murray, Major League Baseball player
- Anne Rudloe, marine biologist
- Peter Shelton, sculptor
- Tim Vogler, NFL player
- Randy Walker, college football coach
- Bradley White, cyclist
- Erin Yenney, professional soccer player
