= WTJS (FM) =

Radio station in Alamo, Tennessee

- Alamo, Tennessee; United States
- Broadcast area: Jackson, Tennessee
- Frequency: 93.1 MHz
- Branding: Good News for West Tennessee 93.1

Programming
- Format: Christian music
- Affiliations: Salem Radio Network

Ownership
- Owner: Grace Broadcasting, Inc.
- Sister stations: WTJK, WKBL, WKBQ

History
- First air date: 1989; 8; 10
- Former call signs: WNBE (1989–1993); WWGM (1993–2018)

Technical information
- Licensing authority: FCC
- Facility ID: 24609
- Class: C3
- ERP: 14,000 watts
- HAAT: 135 meters (443 ft)
- Transmitter coordinates: 35°43′28.00″N 89°3′35.00″W

Links
- Public license information: Public file; LMS
- Webcast: Listen Live

WTJS (93.1 FM) is a radio station broadcasting a Christian music format. Licensed to Alamo, Tennessee, United States, the station is currently owned by Grace Broadcasting Services, Inc.

On December 29, 2021, WTJS changed its format from news/talk to Christian adult contemporary as "Good News 93.1".

On May 8, 2023, WTJS changed its format from contemporary Christian to conservative talk, branded as "Super Talk 93.1".

In May 2026, WTJS changed its format to Contemporary Christian / Southern Gospel mix format after being "Super Talk".
