= WMXX-FM =

Variety hits radio station in Jackson, Tennessee, United States

- Jackson, Tennessee; United States
- Frequency: 103.1 MHz
- Branding: Kool Mixx 103.1 FM

Programming
- Format: Variety hits/AC

Ownership
- Owner: Hunt Communications, LLC

History
- First air date: May 9, 1979
- Former call signs: WJHR (1979–1986); WRJX (1986–1987)
- Call sign meaning: Station branded as Jackson's "Magic Mix" in the late 1980s

Technical information
- Licensing authority: FCC
- Facility ID: 24099
- Class: C2
- ERP: 42,000 watts
- HAAT: 164 meters (538 ft)
- Transmitter coordinates: 35°32′39.00″N 88°47′18.00″W

Links
- Public license information: Public file; LMS
- Website: www.koolmix1031.com

WMXX-FM (103.1 FM) is a commercial radio station licensed to Jackson, Tennessee, broadcasting a variety hits music format known as "Kool Mixx 103.1 FM". The station is currently owned by Hunt Communications, LLC.

== History ==
In 1976, the Federal Communications Commission (FCC) designated for comparative hearing three different applications for the 103.1 MHz frequency, from Charles C. Allen; Community Service Broadcasting, owner of WDXI (1310 AM); and Madison County Broadcasting, a consortium of J. A. Baxter, Gordon L. Bostic, and Gerald Wayne Hunt. Allen dropped out, and in 1978, an FCC hearing examiner selected the Baxter-Bostic-Hunt bid on grounds that Community Service already owned WDXI and radio stations elsewhere, whereas the Madison County Broadcasting principals owned no stations. Final approval, granted in December 1978, allowed for construction to begin; the call sign WJHR was selected, and studios were built on Old Pinson Road.

WJHR began broadcasting with an adult contemporary "easy rock" format on May 9, 1979. It was the first new station in Jackson since WJAK signed on in 1954. The station proved successful, filling a hole in the market and turning a profit within two months of signing on; by the time Community Service moved to purchase it at the end of 1982 for excess of $1 million, it was the number-one FM station, and the combination of WDXI and WJHR put the number one AM and FM outlets in town under one roof. On January 1, 1986, WJHR changed its call sign to WRJX and adopted an album-oriented rock format as "Good Rock 103".

Community Service Broadcasting sold its broadcast properties to CR Broadcasting in 1987 for $4 million; CR set up corporate headquarters in Jackson, and it decided that younger listeners were already well-served by the market's other stations. It flipped WRJX to adult contemporary as WMXX-FM, Jackson's "Magic Mix", on May 8, 1987.

The Glassman brothers, who owned Community Service Broadcasting, repurchased CR Broadcasting in 1992, citing the improving Jackson economy. However, later that year, the Jackson stations were sold later that year to Gerald Wayne Hunt for $350,000. Ten years to the day after closing on selling WJHR, Hunt closed on his purchase of WMXX-FM. The format was immediately changed to oldies, targeting the baby boomer population and with a large female listenership.

Even though WMXX's studios had moved to WDXI's Radio Park facility in Jackson, the tower remained at the Old Pinson Road site. It was struck by lightning in July 2003, with the blaze spreading to and destroying the transmitter building, described as a double-wide trailer surrounded by other construction. The incident took WMXX and WTNV (104.1 FM) off the air for several days, with WTNV having just moved to the WMXX tower after it lost its own in a tornado on May 4. The station has continued in its oldies format, organizing regular "Caravan of Stars" concerts with oldies artists;
