= Troy Public Square =

- U.S. National Register of Historic Places
- U.S. Historic district
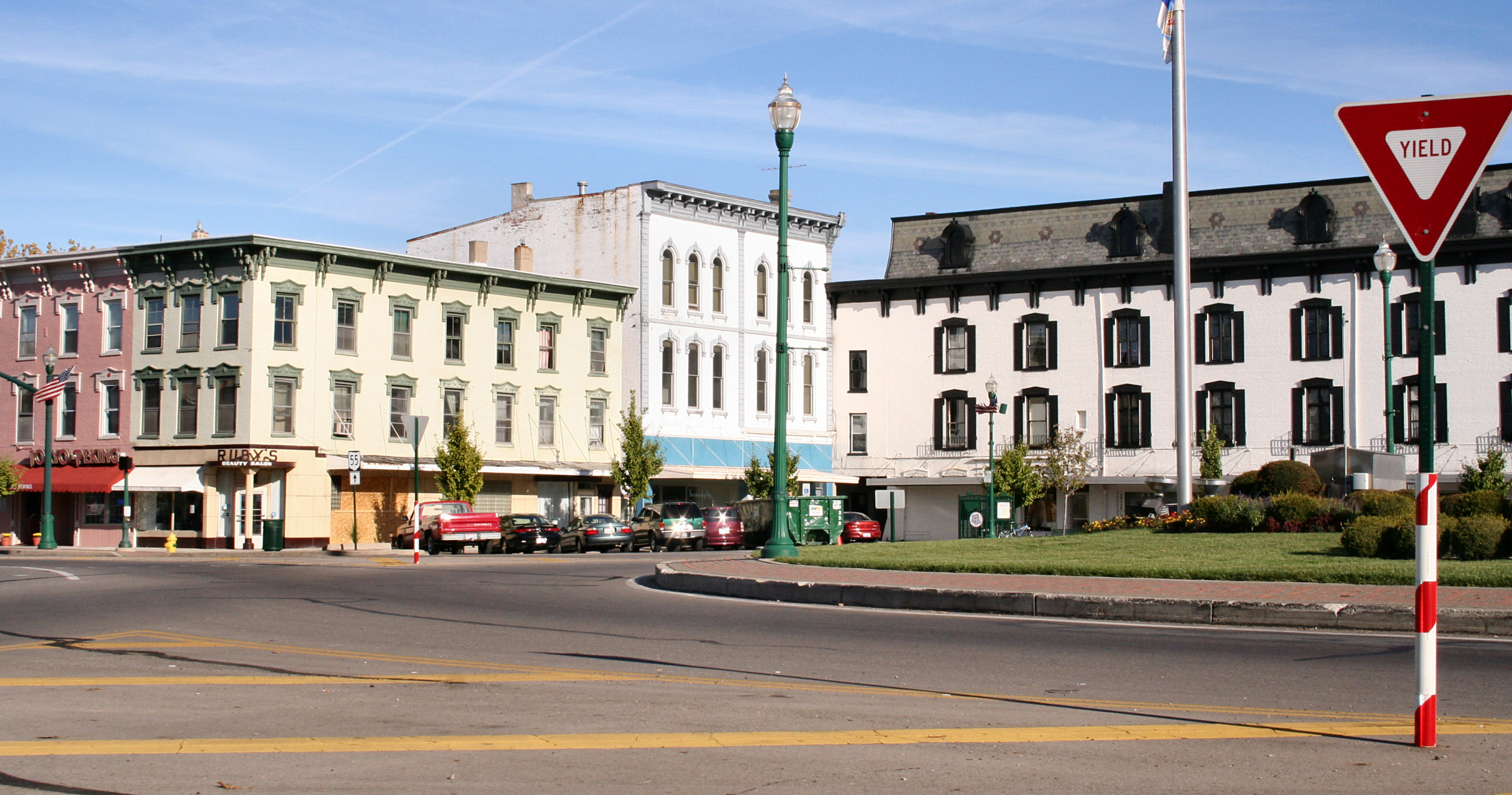
- Troy's Public Square in 2005

- Location within Ohio Location within the United States
- Location: Property surrounding junction of Main and Market Sts., Troy, Ohio
- Coordinates: 40°02′23″N 84°12′12″W
- Architect: multiple
- Architectural style: Late Victorian
- NRHP reference No.: 75001491
- Added to NRHP: June 30, 1975

The Troy Public Square is a historic district in Troy, Ohio, United States that is listed on the National Register of Historic Places. The "downtown area," the junction of Main and Market Streets, is a commerce center for Troy because of its central location in the town, restaurants and stores which line the square. Troy Main Street also hosts events in the Public Square frequently as a way to help grow businesses in the downtown area.
