= WHHG =

Classic rock radio station in Milan, Tennessee, United States

Coordinates: 35.902°N 88.782°W

- Milan, Tennessee; United States
- Broadcast area: Jackson, Tennessee
- Frequency: 92.3 MHz
- Branding: 92.3 the Hog

Programming
- Format: Classic rock
- Affiliations: Premiere Networks; United Stations Radio Networks

Ownership
- Owner: Forever Communications; (Forever South Licenses, LLC)
- Sister stations: WOGY, WTJF, WTJF-FM, WYJJ

History
- First air date: December 12, 1964 (as WKBJ-FM)
- Former call signs: WKBJ-FM (1964–1983); WYNU (1983–2017)
- Call sign meaning: W H HoG

Technical information
- Licensing authority: FCC
- Facility ID: 50125
- Class: C0
- ERP: 100,000 watts
- HAAT: 302 meters (991 ft)

Links
- Public license information: Public file; LMS
- Webcast: Listen live
- Website: www.923thehog.com

WHHG (92.3 FM), known as "92.3 the Hog", is a classic rock formatted radio station based in Milan, Tennessee. The station is owned by Forever Communications, through licensee Forever South Licenses, LLC. WHHG serves Jackson and West Tennessee with an ERP of 100,000 watts at 92.3 MHz. The station can be heard clearly throughout nearly all of West Tennessee, but can be intermittently picked up in Memphis, areas along the Tennessee River, southwestern Kentucky, extreme northern Mississippi, and even in portions of the Arkansas/Missouri delta along the Mississippi River. Previously, the station was "WYNU U92, Classic Hits for U", and before that it was (also with the WYNU calls) "Rock 92.3".

== History ==
In the 1980s, it was known as 92-FM, airing a Top 40 format. Before 2006, WHHG (then WYNU) was owned by Clear Channel Communications. Forever Communications (licensee Forever South) purchased WHHG and WOGY (then WTNV). It would be until 2014 before changes were due for the station. On April 1, Forever reformatted the station as "Classic Hits WYNU U92". In December 2017, the station switched formats back to Classic Rock as "92.3 The Hog". Soon after that in January 2018, the callsign WYNU that was part of the station since 1983 was ditched in favor of WHHG, to go along with the HOG brand.
