= WZZP =

Radio station in Hopkinsville, Kentucky

- Hopkinsville, Kentucky; United States
- Broadcast area: Clarksville–Hopkinsville
- Frequency: 97.5 MHz
- Branding: Z97.5

Programming
- Format: Mainstream rock
- Affiliations: United Stations Radio Networks; Westwood One

Ownership
- Owner: Saga Communications; (Saga Communications of Tuckessee, LLC)
- Sister stations: WCVQ; WKFN; WNZE; WQEZ; WRND; WVVR

History
- First air date: June 29, 2000
- Former call signs: WTNK (June–October 2000)

Technical information
- Licensing authority: FCC
- Facility ID: 83979
- Class: A
- ERP: 6,000 watts
- HAAT: 100 meters (330 ft)
- Transmitter coordinates: 36°45′47″N 87°26′59″W

Links
- Public license information: Public file; LMS
- Webcast: Listen Live
- Website: z975.com

WZZP (97.5 FM "Z97.5") is a mainstream rock radio station licensed to Hopkinsville, Kentucky, United States, and serving the Clarksville, Tennessee and Fort Campbell, Kentucky. Owned by Saga Communications and operated as part of its Five Star Media Group, it debuted with a classic hits format in 2000, switching to the active rock format in 2003. WZZP operates at 6,000 watts from an antenna located in Hopkinsville.

== History ==
On November 9, 1999, Southern Broadcasting, Inc., with its president Thomas T. Cassetty applied to the FCC for a construction permit to build WZZP. The station went on the air as WTNK on June 29, 2000. According to FCC records, the station's original call sign stood for "Tennessee aNd Kentucky". On October 20, 2000, the station changed its call sign to the current WZZP.

== See also ==
- KAZR "103.3 Everything That Rocks", Saga's Des Moines, Iowa station of the same format.
- WLZX-FM 99.3 "Everything That Rocks", Saga's Northampton, Massachusetts station of the same format.
