= WPOT =

- Trenton, Tennessee; United States
- Frequency: 1500 kHz
- Branding: Pure Country Radio

Programming
- Format: Country (WJPJ simulcast)

Ownership
- Owner: Grace Broadcasting Services

History
- First air date: July 1, 2009 (as WTNE)
- Former call signs: WTNE (2009–2014)

Technical information
- Licensing authority: FCC
- Facility ID: 73032
- Class: D
- Power: 250 watts day 6 watts night
- Transmitter coordinates: 35°58′52.00″N 88°55′32.00″W

Links
- Public license information: Public file; LMS
- Webcast: Listen live
- Website: www.goodnewsradionetwork.com

WPOT (1500 AM) is a radio station broadcasting a Christian radio format. Licensed to Trenton, Tennessee, United States, the station is currently owned by Grace Broadcasting Services and features programming from Westwood One. The station went silent on July 1, 2009.

On April 20, 2018, WPOT changed their format from southern gospel to a simulcast of Pure Country Radio-formatted WJPJ 1190 AM Humboldt.
