= WBFG (FM) =

Radio station in Parker's Crossroads, Tennessee

- Parker's Crossroads, Tennessee; United States
- Broadcast area: West Tennessee
- Frequency: 96.5 MHz
- Branding: Talk-N-West Tennessee 96.5 FM, 101.5 FM

Programming
- Format: Conservative talk

Ownership
- Owner: Golden Media Group
- Sister stations: WDXI WNWS-FM

History
- First air date: 1999
- Call sign meaning: We Broadcast For God (former religious format)

Technical information
- Licensing authority: FCC
- Facility ID: 85424
- Class: A
- ERP: 6,000 watts
- HAAT: 100 meters (330 ft)
- Transmitter coordinates: 35°45′33.00″N 88°23′15.00″W

Links
- Public license information: Public file; LMS
- Webcast: Listen live
- Website: talknwesttn.com

WBFG (96.5 FM, "Talk-N-West Tennessee") is a commercial radio station licensed to Parker's Crossroads, Tennessee, United States, serving rural West Tennessee and Jackson. Owned by News Talk West Tennessee, LLC., the station features a conservative talk format with local coverage of local high school football and basketball.

WBFG's transmitter is sited on Enochs Lane near Tennessee State Route 22 in Parker's Crossroads.

== History ==
The station received its construction permit from the Federal Communications Commission in the late 1990s. The original owner, planning a Christian radio format, chose the call sign WBFG for the slogan "We Broadcast for God." In 1999, the construction permit was acquired by Crossroads Broadcasting LLC, based in Lexington.

The station signed on the air in late 1999. It had a sports radio format, featuring programming from ESPN Radio and local coverage of West Tennessee high school sports. In 2023, the station flipped to a conservative talk format, with local hosts part of the day and syndicated talk shows nights and weekends.
