= WVVR =

Radio station in Hopkinsville, Kentucky

- Hopkinsville, Kentucky; United States
- Broadcast area: Clarksville–Hopkinsville
- Frequency: 100.3 MHz
- Branding: Beaver 100.3

Programming
- Format: Country
- Affiliations: Westwood One

Ownership
- Owner: Saga Communications; (Saga Communications of Tuckessee, LLC)
- Sister stations: WCVQ; WKFN; WNZE; WQEZ; WRND; WZZP

History
- First air date: September 17, 1960
- Former call signs: WKOF (1960–1976); WKSD (1976–1977); WKOA-FM (1977–1986); WZZF (1986–1994)

Technical information
- Licensing authority: FCC
- Facility ID: 73970
- Class: C0
- ERP: 100,000 watts
- HAAT: 305 meters (1,001 ft)
- Transmitter coordinates: 36°56′58″N 87°40′18″W

Links
- Public license information: Public file; LMS
- Webcast: Listen live
- Website: beaver1003.com

WVVR (100.3 FM, "Beaver 100.3") is a radio station licensed to Hopkinsville, Kentucky, United States and serving the Clarksville–Hopkinsville area. The station is owned by Saga Communications through licensee Saga Communications of Tuckessee, LLC, and operates as part of its Five Star Media Group. It airs a country music format.

== History ==
=== Early days ===
The station's construction permit was issued by the FCC on February 27, 1960. It went on the air on September 17, 1960, as WKOF under ownership of Pennyrile Broadcasting Company. It was a part-time simulcast of WKOA (1480 AM), which was previously owned by the Kentucky New Era newspaper, with 50% of WKOF's programming being a separate entity from the AM station. In 1968, its first power increase was granted for the station to increase its power from its original 7,950 watts to 30,000 watts. The station then changed the callsign to WKSD on July 1, 1976. The station was purchased in 1977 by a group of Hopkinsville, Kentucky investors, under the business name Pennyrile Broadcasting Company, with Hal King serving as the manager; the new owners changed the callsign to WKOA-FM on November 10, 1977. In 1979, the station relocated its transmission facility from its original location near the Western Kentucky Fairgrounds to its current location, and increased its signal power to its current 100,000 watts, becoming one of the most powerful radio stations in the Hopkinsville area.

Over time the station programmed beautiful music, stereo rock and contemporary hit radio, with brandings such as "K-100" and "Z-100". When the station became Z-100 in Spring 1986, the station changed its call letters to WZZF-FM. In September 1990, the CHR format and "Z" branding were dropped and was rebranded Kool 100, changing its format to oldies.

=== Rebranding as WVVR, the Beaver ===
In 1994, the station was purchased by WRUS, Inc., of Russellville, Kentucky (a division of Forever Broadcasting at the time). WZZF retained its oldies format for a little longer, but changed call letters to the current WVVR on July 1 of that same year, when it joined forces with WBVR-FM (96.7 MHz, now WOVO) to simulcast the latter's country music format. For the ten years prior to this, WBVR-FM (originally broadcast at 101.1 MHz) in Russellville was considered to be the "Original Beaver" radio station, with the hook phrase "The Beaver 1-oh-1 FM". That station had far less power and was separate until its purchase later on after the Beaver branding was reallocated onto the former WMJM (96.7 MHz). That changed after the tower and frequency were sold to Clear Channel in Nashville, Tennessee; although the license for the 101.1 MHz frequency remains licensed in Russellville, the frequency is now in use by Nashville-based hip hop station WUBT. This is when WBVR-FM (licensed to nearby Auburn as of 2001) adopted the 96.7 FM frequency in Bowling Green after the closure of WMJM's previous operations. Afterward, the Hopkinsville station adopted a new branding, "Beaver 100.3". Beaver Country programming was fed to both WBVR and WVVR from its Russellville studio. This ended in the late 1990s, when the station moved out of its studios in Russellville, Kentucky, and split operations between new studios located in both Bowling Green and downtown Hopkinsville. The Beaver branding is currently used by both WVVR and the Horse Cave-licensed WBVR-FM (106.3 MHz, formerly WOVO), under separate ownership. After the sell off from Forever Broadcasting in the 2000s, the station was moved to a brand new location in Clarksville, Tennessee, along with the other main Clarksville stations including WCVQ.

=== Former on-air personalities ===
- Scooter Davis (d. 6/24/2016)
- Myla Thomas (currently mornings at WBVR in Bowling Green)
- Radio Rusty (Engineer for WFGS in Murray, KY)
- Steve Meredith aka "Roy Calhoun"
- Dylan "The Country Music Thriller" Miller
- Bailey Brooks (currently at WVVR as morning show co-host)
- Cheyenne Rivers
- Michael Davis (currently at WFGS in Murray, Kentucky)
- Marc Green
- Shannon Presley (currently at WBVR in Bowling Green)
- Alan Austin (currently at WBVR in Bowling Green)
- Tony Pratt aka "Kaptain Kicks" (currently at Nashville Country Television Network in Nashville, TN)
