= Troy City Schools =

School district in Ohio, United States

Address
- 500 North Market Street Troy, Ohio, 45373; United States

District information
- Type: Public
- Grades: KG–12
- Schools: 9
- NCES District ID: 3904492

Students and staff
- Students: 3,929 (2025–2026)
- Teachers: 234.62 (on an FTE basis) (2025–2026)
- Staff: 371.46 (on an FTE basis) (2025–2026)
- Student–teacher ratio: 16.75 (2025–2026)

Other information
- Website: www.troy.k12.oh.us

Troy City Schools is the school district headquartered Troy, Ohio.

It includes most of the city of Troy.

On February 10, 2014 Eric Herman, the district superintendent, notified Troy City Schools board of education that the Ohio School Facilities Commission gave the district a $17,985 grant to buy a security communication system. This would allow school employees to immediately send alerts to police officer vehicles and school offices.

== Schools ==
- Troy High School
- Troy Junior High School
- Van Cleve 6th Grade School

K-5 elementary schools:

- Concord Elementary
- Cookson Elementary
- Forest Elementary
- Heywood Elementary
- Hook Elementary
- Kyle Elementary

In Van Cleve there are currently over 400 students.
