= WNWS-FM =

- Jackson, Tennessee; United States
- Frequency: 101.5 MHz
- Branding: Talk-N West Tennessee

Programming
- Format: News Talk Information
- Affiliations: USA Radio Network, Westwood One

Ownership
- Owner: Golden Media Group Inc.
- Sister stations: WDXI, WBFG (FM)

History
- First air date: August 30, 1993
- Former call signs: WVYG (1991–1993)
- Call sign meaning: News

Technical information
- Licensing authority: FCC
- Facility ID: 29671
- Class: A
- ERP: 2,200 watts
- HAAT: 116.0 meters
- Transmitter coordinates: 35°38′59.00″N 88°46′11.00″W

Links
- Public license information: Public file; LMS
- Webcast: Listen Live
- Website: wnws.com

WNWS-FM (101.5 FM) is a radio station broadcasting a News Talk Information format. Licensed to Jackson, Tennessee, United States, the station serves the Jackson area. The station is currently owned by Radiocorp of Jackson, Inc. and features programing from CBS Radio and Westwood One.

The station airs Dave Ramsey's financial affairs show, as well as local programs The 180 hosted by Dan Reaves (not the former National Football League head coach), and Sea Bass, Mid-Day Smack hosted by Mike Doles and Danny Keith, The Afternoon Show hosted by Keith Sherley and The Cheap Seats hosted by Sea Bass (a sports talk show). Greg Wood and Coleman Smith host the morning show Daybreak.

The station also broadcasts live video streams of High School Football and Basketball for 6 high schools in and around Jackson, TN. The teams include University School of Jackson, Crockett County High School, Chester County High School, South Gibson High School, and Haywood County High School, plus a game of the week for one of the three Jackson Madison County Public Schools including Jackson South Side, Jackson North Side, and Liberty Tech.
