= WOGY =

Country music radio station in Jackson, Tennessee, United States

- Jackson, Tennessee; United States
- Frequency: 104.1 MHz
- Branding: Froggy 104

Programming
- Format: Country
- Affiliations: Westwood One

Ownership
- Owner: Forever Communications; (Forever South Licenses, LLC)
- Sister stations: WHHG, WTJF, WTJF-FM, WYJJ

History
- First air date: August 24, 1947
- Former call signs: WTJS-FM (1947–1976); WKIR (1976–1987); WTNV (1987–July 2006); WJGY (July–October 2006)
- Former frequencies: 100.7 MHz (1947–1950s)
- Call sign meaning: "Froggy"

Technical information
- Licensing authority: FCC
- Facility ID: 14743
- Class: C1
- ERP: 100,000 watts
- HAAT: 208 meters (682 ft)
- Transmitter coordinates: 35.647°N 88.833°W

Links
- Public license information: Public file; LMS
- Webcast: Listen Live
- Website: www.radio731.com/stations/froggy/

WOGY (104.1 FM), known as "Froggy 104", is an American radio station licensed to Jackson, Tennessee, and owned by Forever Communications through Forever South Licenses, LLC. As of October, 2007, the programming format is country music. The station is a 100,000 watt radio station that reaches as far north as Kentucky and even covers the eastern suburbs of Memphis.

== History ==
WOGY went on the air on August 24, 1947, as WTJS-FM, the FM counterpart of WTJS, owned by The Jackson Sun. The station changed its call letters to WKIR on January 1, 1976.

=== 104.1 MHz Jackson ===
The station was formerly Eagle 104 with the callsigns WTNV and was owned by Clear Channel Communications. After becoming "Froggy 104" the callsign was WJGY.

=== WOGY callsign ===
The callsign WOGY once belonged to a radio station in Memphis, Tennessee at the 94.1 MHz frequency known as "Froggy 94", which is currently WMLE. The station was owned by Sinclair Broadcast Group which ran the format from March 1993 to January 2001 until Entercom bought the station and flipped the format.

WOGY was then owned, but never used, by a northwestern Tennessee Radio Group. When that group relinquished control of the callsign, Forever Communications then gained control and changed the WJGY callsign to its current state.

== Currently ==
104 became 'Froggy 104' on August 1, 2006. "The Morning Splash" features Tad Pole and Lily Padd, mid-days are hosted by Cricket and "The Big Time with Whitney Allen" rounds out the weekdays.

== Coverage ==
Cities in WOGY's West Tennessee coverage area include: Jackson, Bolivar, Dyersburg, Union City, Paris, and Lexington, Tennessee.

== Sister stations ==
Forever also owns "92.3 the Hog" WHHG, The Willie Radio Network (1390 WTJF and 94.1FM) as well as JJ 97.7 WYJJ.
