= WDXL =

Lexington, Tennessee; United States
- Frequency: 1490 kHz
- Branding: Southern Gospel AM 1490

Programming
- Format: Defunct (formerly Southern Gospel)
- Affiliations: Citadel Media

Ownership
- Owner: Lexington Broadcasting Service, Inc.

Technical information
- Facility ID: 37196
- Class: C
- Power: 1,000 watts unlimited
- Transmitter coordinates: 35°38′5.00″N 88°23′34.00″W

WDXL (1490 AM, "Southern Gospel AM 1490") was a radio station broadcasting a southern gospel music format. Licensed to Lexington, Tennessee, United States, the station was owned by Lexington Broadcasting Service, Inc. and featured programming from Citadel Media.

WDXL's owners surrendered its license to the Federal Communications Commission (FCC) on December 9, 2013; as a result, the FCC cancelled the station's license on December 18, 2013.
