= Troy High School (Ohio) =

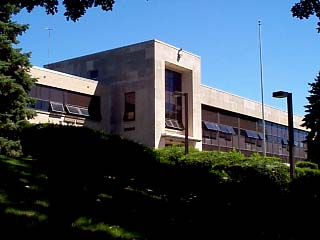
- Front entrance of Troy High School before renovation work

Location
- 151 Staunton Road; Troy, Ohio 45373; United States; 40°02′44″N 84°12′04″W

Information
- Type: Public
- Motto: Truth, Honor, Sportsmanship
- Established: 1852; 174 years ago
- School district: Troy City Schools
- Principal: Alexis Dedrick
- Staff: 55.00 (FTE)
- Grades: 9-12
- Enrollment: 1,222 (2023–2024)
- Student to teacher ratio: 22.22
- Colors: Scarlet and Grey
- Athletics: Football, Baseball, Basketball, Soccer, Ice Hockey, Gymnastics, Volleyball, Golf, Tennis, Bowling, Wrestling, Track, Cross Country, Swimming
- Athletics conference: Miami Valley League
- Mascot: Trojan
- Team name: Trojans
- Rival: Piqua High School, Tippecanoe High School
- Website: www.troy.k12.oh.us

Troy High School is a public high school in Troy, Ohio, part of Troy City Schools. The current 182,000-square-foot (16,900 m^{2}) complex was built in 1958, and has an enrollment of 1,504 students. The school's mascot is the Trojan. Their athletic teams compete in the Miami Valley League (MVL).

== 1969–1971 Trojans football ==
In 1969 Troy Trojans was a high school team that was rebuilding and led by undersized sophomores, they were having a terrible season (they went 2-7-1), this making four straight losing seasons, two in the Western Ohio League (WOL) 1968 and 1969, and two before that (1966–1967) in the Miami Valley League (MVL). On the last play, of the last game of the season, with the game tied 22-22 against powerful rival Huber Heights Wayne, the pass went to the 165-pound Randy Walker. He was tackled 8 inches (200 mm) from the end zone. After the game the coach, James "Jim" Conard, made the entire team walk around with a piece of cloth that was 18 inches (460 mm) long, until the start of the 1970 season. Walker gave up his first love, baseball, joined the track team for speed and stamina, and started lifting weights-gaining 30 pounds, reporting to fall practice at 195-pounds.

The 18-inch (460 mm) strip of cloth would motivate his team, Conard and Walker would not lose another game the remaining two seasons, going 20-0, and winning back-to-back WOL titles. In 1971 they outscored opponents, 406-54, out-gained opponents 3,711 yards (3,393 m) to 1,267, and punting only 19 times all season. The team and the defense dominated opponents, forcing 31 turnovers, and posting five shutouts (including a 35-0 victory over Wayne).

Three backs would be selected to the All-Western Ohio League team, Gordon Bell, Walker, and Joe Allen. Bell, who gained 3,707 yards (3,390 m) in three seasons, rushed for 1,447 yards (on 198 carries) and scored 19 touchdowns in 1971, and was named first team All-Ohio for both 1970 and 1971. Bell would have also been "Ohio Back of the Year" had he not finished second, to Archie Griffin (Columbus Eastmoor), in both years. Walker, whose main assignment was to block, rushed for 724 yards (662 m), on a 14.9 yards (13.6 m) per carry average. Allen had 544 yards (497 m) on 67 carries (8.1 YPC). David Starkey, the heart of the defense and was named an All-Ohio defensive lineman. Elmo Boyd, a track star who only played football his senior season (1971), finished with 12 catches for 374 yards (31.2 yards-per-catch average) and seven touchdowns.

In 2001, the 1971 team was selected by a panel of Dayton Daily News sports writers as the best Miami Valley prep football team of the last 50 years. Coach Conard retired after the 1971 season to become a principal at Troy Junior High.

20 players from the 1971 Trojans would go on to play college football, 15 of those at the Division I level, and two would play in the National Football League (NFL). Bell would go on to play for the Michigan Wolverines in college, gaining 2,900 yards, and play four seasons in the NFL for the New York Giants and St. Louis Cardinals. Walker would star in three seasons at fullback for the Miami RedHawks, on a team that went 32-1-1, winning the Mid-American Conference title all three years. Drafted by the Cincinnati Bengals (1976; 13th round), Walker would instead choose to become an assistant coach (later head coach of both the Miami RedHawks and the Northwestern Wildcats). Boyd went on to play football at Eastern Kentucky and with the NFL's San Francisco 49ers. Starkey and fullback Joe Allen would play for the Florida Gators. In addition quarterback Al Mayer went on to play at Marshall.

== Clubs and activities ==
The school's Latin Club functions as a local chapter of both the Ohio Junior Classical League (OJCL) and National Junior Classical League (NJCL).

Troy High School entered the National Archery in the Schools Program (NASP) in 2008. Since then, the Troy High School Archery Team has gone to the state NASP tournament in Columbus, OH and the national NASP tournament in Louisville, KY every year. In 2011 the team as a whole placed 29th in the nation.

Other clubs and activities include:

- Academic Quiz Team
- ASL Club
- Yearbook
- ASTRA
- Book Club
- Business Club (FBLA)
- Chess Club
- Drama Club
- Great Outdoors Club
- FCA
- FCCLA
- GSA
- Interact
- Junior Cabinet
- Key Club
- Math Club
- Musical
- National Honor Society
- Newspaper
- Senior Cabinet
- Spanish Club (inactive for 2020-21 school year)
- Student Council
- Xtreme Bots

== OHSAA State Championships ==
- 2016 Girls Bowling
- 2011 Boys Bowling

== Trojan Marching Band ==
The Troy High School Trojan Marching Band has qualified for State Marching Band Finals since the events inception in 1980. In addition, the Troy Marching Band has received a Superior rating at this event since 2000. The Trojan Marching Band has performed in the London New Year's Day Parade in 2002, 2006, 2010, 2014, 2018, and 2022.

== Recent years ==
In October 2005, a $12 million renovation commenced. These plans included a new gymnasium, student commons, science wing, new restrooms, new tennis court as well as a new student parking lot. Construction began about January 2006 and was completed about March 2007.

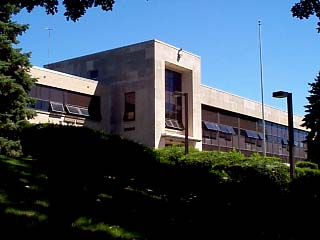
A view of the front entrance of Troy High School

== Notable alumni ==
- Gordon Bell, NFL football player
- Ryan Brewer, 1998 Ohio Mr. Football award
- Nancy J. Currie, American astronaut
- Kris Dielman, NFL football player and four time Pro Bowl selection
- Casey Black DeSantis, First lady of Florida
- Heath Murray, Former MLB player (San Diego Padres, Detroit Tigers, Cleveland Indians)
- Tommy Myers, NFL football player
- Bob Ferguson, NFL football player
- Tanya Thornton Shewell, Maryland politician
- Tom Vaughn, NFL football player
- Randy Walker, NCAA football coach
