= WRND =

Radio station in Oak Grove, Kentucky

Coordinates: 36.641°N 87.434°W

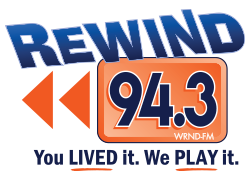
- Oak Grove, Kentucky; United States
- Broadcast area: Clarksville, Tennessee; Fort Campbell, Kentucky
- Frequency: 94.3 MHz
- Branding: Rewind 94.3

Programming
- Format: Classic hits
- Affiliations: Premiere Networks; Westwood One

Ownership
- Owner: Saga Communications; (Saga Communications of Tuckessee, LLC)
- Sister stations: WCVQ; WKFN; WNZE; WQEZ; WVVR; WZZP

History
- First air date: 1965 (as WDBL-FM)
- Former call signs: WDBL-FM (1979–2002); WJOI-FM (2002–2004); WEGI (2004–2009); WEGI-FM (2009–2013); WRND-FM (2013–2018)
- Call sign meaning: RewiND

Technical information
- Licensing authority: FCC
- Facility ID: 14915
- Class: A
- ERP: 6,000 watts
- HAAT: 78 meters

Links
- Public license information: Public file; LMS
- Webcast: Listen Live
- Website: rewind943.com

WRND (94.3 FM, "Rewind 94.3") is a commercial radio station licensed to Oak Grove, Kentucky, United States, and serving the Clarksville, Tennessee and Fort Campbell, Kentucky areas. WRND and its sister stations are known as the "Five Star Radio Group" and is owned by Saga Communications.

== History ==
The station had its beginning in 1965, licensed to Springfield, Tennessee as WDBL-FM. According to FCC records, the station changed calls on November 4, 2002, to WJOI-FM and then changed calls again on March 13, 2004, to WEGI. Saga Communications assumed ownership and control of the station on July 3, 2003, from Tuned In Broadcasting, Inc.

Saga Communications, Inc. had the FCC change the city of license to Oak Grove, Kentucky.

On April 15, 2009, WEGI-FM "Eagle 94.3" began simulcasting on WEGI AM 1370, one of Saga Communications, Inc.'s AM properties. They broadcast a new top of the hour FCC ID check as "WEGI-AM 1370, FORT CAMPBELL ... WEGI-FM 94.3 OAK GROVE". At this time, the call sign on 94.3 FM was changed from WEGI to WEGI-FM so that AM 1370 could change their call sign from WJQI to WEGI.

On December 26, 2013, WEGI-FM shifted their format to variety hits, branded as "Rewind 94.3". The station changed its call sign to WRND-FM on December 27, 2013, and then to the current WRND on March 5, 2018.
