= WKBL (AM) =

- Covington, Tennessee; United States
- Frequency: 1250 kHz
- Branding: KBL 1250 & K 105.3

Programming
- Format: Classic Hits

Ownership
- Owner: Charles Ennis; (Grace Broadcasting Services, Inc.)
- Sister stations: WKBQ, WTJK

History
- First air date: August 16, 1954; 71 years ago

Technical information
- Licensing authority: FCC
- Facility ID: 57887
- Class: D
- Power: 800 watts (day); 80 watts (night)
- Transmitter coordinates: 35°35′12.00″N 89°38′21.00″W
- Translator: (101.9 MHz) W270DR (Covington)

Links
- Public license information: Public file; LMS
- Webcast: Listen live

WKBL (1250 AM) is a radio station broadcasting a Classic Hits format. Licensed to Covington, Tennessee, United States, the station is currently owned by Charles Ennis, through licensee Grace Broadcasting Services, Inc.

On April 20, 2018, WKBL changed their format from oldies to Christian radio, branded as "Good News Radio", simulcasting WJPJ 1190 AM Humboldt.

On May 25, 2025, WKBL started simulcasting with sister station WTJK "K 105.3" Humboldt/Jackson TN boosting its coverage area to cover more of West Tennessee.
