= WCVQ =

Radio station in Fort Campbell, Kentucky

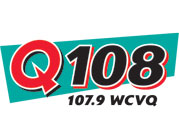
- Fort Campbell, Kentucky; United States
- Broadcast area: Clarksville–Hopkinsville
- Frequency: 107.9 MHz (HD Radio)
- Branding: Q108

Programming
- Format: Hot adult contemporary
- Subchannels: HD2: 99.1 The Fort (Rhythmic Top 40); HD3: 100.7 The Outlaw (Classic country)
- Affiliations: Premiere Networks; Westwood One

Ownership
- Owner: Saga Communications; (Saga Communications of Tuckessee, LLC)
- Sister stations: WKFN; WNZE; WQEZ; WRND; WVVR; WZZP

History
- First air date: 1968
- Former call signs: WABD-FM (1968–1986)

Technical information
- Licensing authority: FCC
- Facility ID: 61253
- Class: C1
- ERP: 100,000 watts
- HAAT: 275 meters (902 ft)
- Transmitter coordinates: 36°32′23″N 87°39′45″W
- Translators: HD2: 99.1 W256CI (Clarksville); HD3: 100.7 W264CK (Clarksville)

Links
- Public license information: Public file; LMS
- Webcast: Listen Live; Listen Live (HD2); Listen Live (HD3)
- Website: q108.com 991thefort.com (HD2) outlaw1007.com (HD3)

WCVQ (107.9 FM, "Q108") is a radio station licensed to Fort Campbell, Kentucky, United States, broadcasting a hot adult contemporary format in the Clarksville–Hopkinsville broadcast area. The station is owned by Saga Communications under licensee Saga Communications of Tuckessee, LLC, and operates as part of its Five Star Media Group. and is also broadcasting on HD radio.

WCVQ studios and offices are co-located with its sister stations in Clarksville, Montgomery County, Tennessee; all of which make up a cluster known as the 5 Star Radio Group, a unit of Saga Communications, Inc. The station's transmitter is located near the junction of US 79/SR 76 and SR 46 in eastern Stewart County just north of Indian Mound.

== History ==
The station first signed on the air in 1968 as WABD-FM, which at the time was a sister station to the AM station with the same call letters. Under ownership by the Fort Campbell Broadcasting Company, WABD (AM 1370, now WQEZ) was a Top 40-formatted station. In the late 1970s, WABD-FM broadcast an album rock format, while WABD switched to oldies.

On December 13, 1986, the station was sold to Southern Broadcasting Corporation, and changed their call letters to the current WCVQ. The station has used the Q-108 branding ever since. Also in December 1986, WCVQ upgraded its signal to a 100,000 watt signal. Its current owner, Saga Communications, purchased the station in 2000. The station's signal has been transmitting from their current 950 feet (290 m) tower ever since.

=== HD Radio launch and FM translators ===
In 2014, through its HD radio signal, the station launched its HD2 subchannel to serve as a Contemporary Christian station, branded as "Sunny 99.1," which is simulcast over analog low-powered FM translator W256CI, which broadcasts at 99.1 megahertz. The next year, an HD3 subchannel was launched to bring the Classic Country format to the area, which is simulcast over W264CK, at 100.7 megahertz.

=== Translators ===
Broadcast translator for WCVQ-HD2
Call sign	Frequency	City of license	FID	ERP (W)	HAAT	Class	FCC info
W256CI	99.1 FM	Clarksville, Tennessee	154860	250	90 m (295 ft)	D	LMS

Broadcast translator for WCVQ-HD3
Call sign	Frequency	City of license	FID	ERP (W)	HAAT	Class	FCC info
W264CK	100.7 FM	Clarksville, Tennessee	89006	250	98 m (322 ft)	D	LMS

== Signal coverage ==
WCVQ's primary coverage area is the Clarksville–Hopkinsville metropolitan area, covering the Pennyrile region of Western Kentucky and northwestern Middle Tennessee. WCVQ also secondarily covers the Nashville Metropolitan Area as it is considered to be in both the Clarksville and Nashville radio markets.
