= WTJF-FM =

Sports radio station Dyer, Tennessee

- Dyer, Tennessee; United States
- Frequency: 94.3 MHz
- Branding: Sports Radio 94/1390

Programming
- Format: Sports radio
- Affiliations: ESPN Radio

Ownership
- Owner: Forever Communications; (Forever South Licenses, LLC)
- Sister stations: WHHG, WOGY, WTJF, WYJJ

History
- First air date: 1995 (as WLSQ-FM)
- Former call signs: WLSQ-FM (1993–2006); WQGY (2006–2007); WLLI-FM (2007–2008); WTJJ (2008–2016); WDYE (2016–2017); WLLI-FM (2017–2019); WZGY (2019–2020)

Technical information
- Licensing authority: FCC
- Facility ID: 20390
- Class: A
- ERP: 6,000 watts
- HAAT: 100 meters (330 ft)
- Transmitter coordinates: 36°6′12.00″N 89°7′45.00″W

Links
- Public license information: Public file; LMS
- Webcast: Listen live
- Website: www.radio731.com/stations/sportsradio/

WTJF-FM (94.3 FM) is a radio station broadcasting a Sports format. Licensed to Dyer, Tennessee, United States, the station is owned by Forever Communications, through licensee Forever South Licenses, LLC.

== History ==
On March 14, 2016, the then-WDYE changed its format from a simulcast of news/talk-formatted WTJS 1390 AM to country. On January 16, 2017, WDYE changed its call letters to WLLI-FM and changed its format to classic country, branded as "Willie 94", joining in a simulcast of 1390 AM once more.

The station changed its call sign to WZGY on December 30, 2019. On February 3, 2020, WZGY changed its format from classic country to country, branded as "Froggy 94.3 & 99.3".

On December 30, 2020, WZGY changed its call letters to WTJF-FM and flipped to conservative talk, once again simulcasting 1390 AM. The conservative talk programming was replaced with a sports radio format, primarily featuring ESPN Radio programming, on January 1, 2024.
