= WQEZ =

Radio station in Fort Campbell, Kentucky

- Fort Campbell, Kentucky; United States
- Broadcast area: Clarksville, Tennessee–Hopkinsville, Kentucky
- Frequency: 1370 kHz
- Branding: La Pantera 99.9

Programming
- Format: Spanish CHR & Regional Mexican

Ownership
- Owner: Saga Communications; (Saga Communications of Tuckessee, LLC)
- Sister stations: WCVQ; WKFN; WNZE; WRND; WVVR; WZZP

History
- First air date: 1963 (as WABD)
- Former call signs: WABD (1963–2001); WJMR (2001–2003); WKFN (2003–2005); WJQI (2005–2009); WEGI (2009–2013); WRND (2013–2018)
- Call sign meaning: "EZ" (former branding)

Technical information
- Licensing authority: FCC
- Facility ID: 61260
- Class: D
- Power: 1,000 watts (day); 53 watts (night)
- Transmitter coordinates: 36°38′28″N 87°26′1″W
- Translator: 99.9 W260DH (Fort Campbell)

Links
- Public license information: Public file; LMS
- Webcast: Listen Live
- Website: lapantera999.com

WQEZ (1370 AM) is a radio station broadcasting a Spanish CHR format. Licensed to Fort Campbell, Kentucky, United States, the station serves the Clarksville–Hopkinsville area. The station is owned by Saga Communications through licensee Saga Communications of Tuckessee, LLC, and operates as part of its Five Star Media Group. Its tower and transmitter located on Stateline Road in Oak Grove, Kentucky immediately outside the main gates of the Fort Campbell, Kentucky military installation.

== History ==
Former logo used until July 19, 2025

The station went on the air as WABD in 1963 broadcasting a top-40 station appealing to soldiers and their families at the Fort Campbell Military Reservation. Leo Wilson of Hopkinsville helped build the station and Gary L. Latham was president and general manager. In addition to Latham, Shelby McCallum and then-Kentucky Governor Ned Breathitt were partners in the station, whose call letters stood for "Airborne Division", in honor of the 101st Airborne Division at the military base. The station launched WABD-FM (now WCVQ) in 1968. In the late 1970s, album rock moved to WABD-FM and the AM became oldies.

In 1986, the stations were sold to Southern Broadcasting of Clarksville, Tennessee, with Tom Cassetty, president and general manager. WABD-FM changed call letters to WCVQ-FM; that station became gold-based adult contemporary sound, while WABD took the urban format.

Southern sold the stations to Saga Communications, Inc., the current owner and operator.

Today the station's studios and offices are located in Clarksville, Tennessee co-located with WVVR, WCVQ, WKFN, WZZP-FM, and WRND-FM, a cluster of stations known as the 5 Star Radio Group owned by Saga Communications.

The station changed its format to all country gospel music on January 1, 2008.

On April 15, 2009, Saga dropped the all country gospel music format to simulcast WEGI-FM "Eagle 94.3 Classic Hits" and changed the call letters to WEGI.

On December 26, 2013, WEGI (along with WEGI-FM) shifted their format to variety hits, branded as "Rewind 94.3". The stations changed their call signs to WRND and WRND-FM, respectively, on December 27, 2013.

On April 11, 2018, WRND split from its simulcast with WRND-FM and changed their format to soft adult contemporary, branded as "EZ 99.9" under new WQEZ calls. The 99.9 frequency in the branding is for FM translator W260DH 99.9 FM Fort Campbell.

On July 19, 2025, WQEZ dropped its soft adult contemporary format and flipped to a Spanish CHR format, branded as "La Pantera 99.9".
