= WJZM =

Classic Hits radio station in Waverly, Tennessee

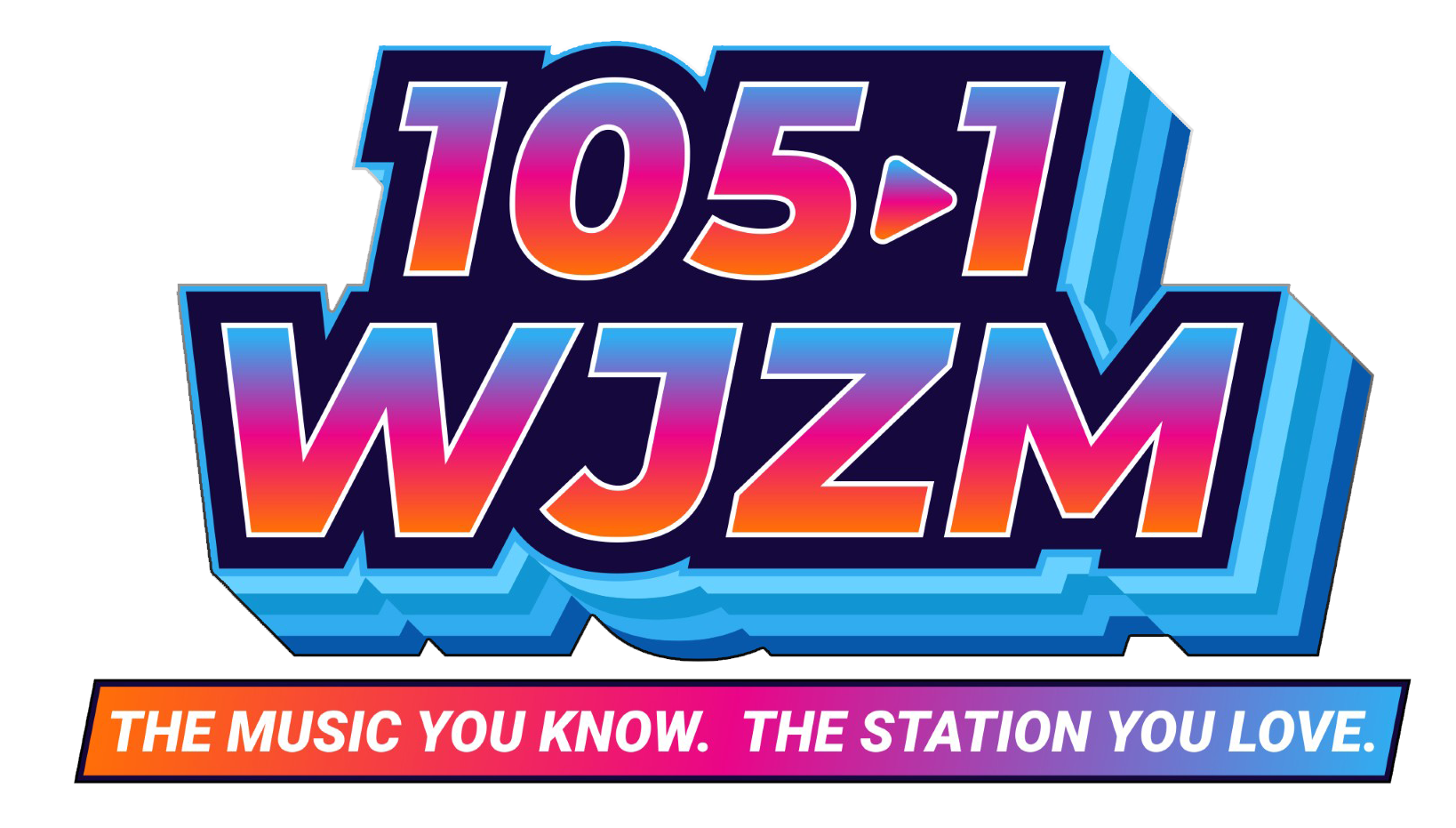
- Waverly, Tennessee; United States
- Broadcast area: Clarksville metropolitan area
- Frequency: 105.1 MHz
- Branding: Classic Hits 105.1 WJZM

Programming
- Language: English
- Format: Classic hits
- Affiliations: ABC News Radio; Premiere Networks; United Stations Radio Networks

Ownership
- Owner: Fowler Media, LLC; (Fowler Media, LLC)

History
- First air date: September 26, 1972 (as WVRY at 104.9)
- Former call signs: WVRY (1972–2016); WVWF (2016–2019); WBWR (2019); WVWF (2019–2020); WVWB (2020–2021); WOWQ (2021–2022); WLFN (2022–2024)
- Former frequencies: 104.9 MHz (1972–1989)

Technical information
- Licensing authority: FCC
- Facility ID: 41865
- Class: C2
- ERP: 50,000 watts
- HAAT: 150 meters (490 ft)
- Transmitter coordinates: 36°05′25″N 87°38′05″W

Links
- Public license information: Public file; LMS
- Webcast: Listen live
- Website: 1051wjzm.com

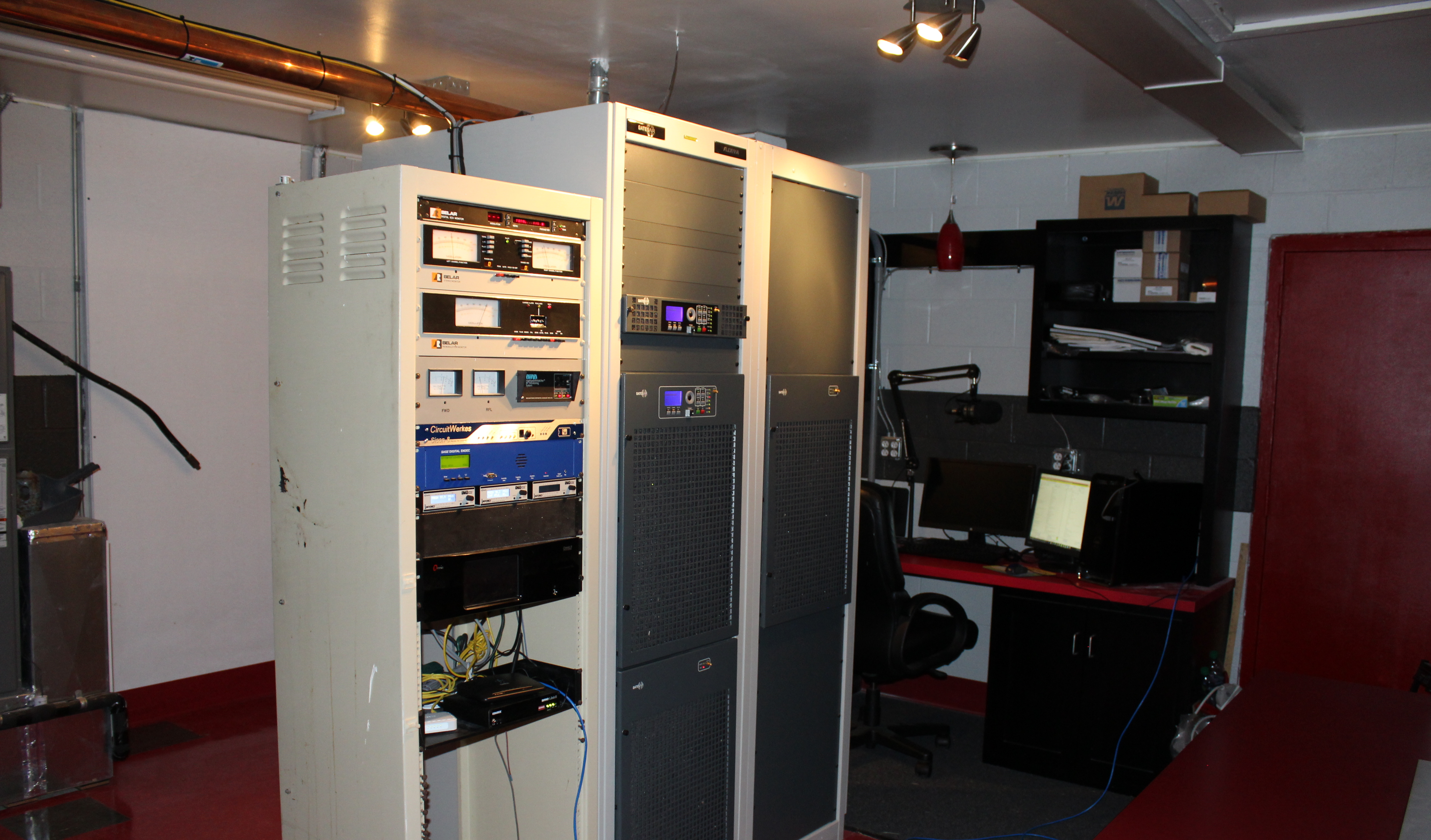
Transmitter

WJZM (105.1 FM) is a commercial radio station licensed to serve Waverly, the county seat of Humphreys County, Tennessee, United States. The station, established in 1972, is owned by Fowler Media, LLC of Montgomery County, Tennessee and broadcasts a classic hits format. The WJZM studio and offices are located in West Clarksville, Tennessee. WJZM were the first Call Signs issued by the Federal Communications Commission to serve Clarksville, Tennessee and Montgomery County, Tennessee in 1941. WJZM has an effective radiated power of 50,000 watts.

== Programming ==
105-1 WJZM broadcasts an adult contemporary Music Format with Local News, Accuweather, ABC News and syndicated shows On with Mario Lopez, Delilah at Night and the Hot AC version of the iHeart Radio Countdown and Carson Daly's Daly Download on the weekends. WJZM also broadcasts Smooth Jazz Overnights from 1am-5am.

== History ==
The station began broadcast operations on September 26, 1972, with 3,000 watts of effective radiated power on a frequency of 104.9 MHz from an antenna 300 feet (91 m) in height above average terrain. The station was assigned the call sign WVRY by the Federal Communications Commission (FCC). The station was built by Humphreys County Broadcasting Company as an FM sister station to WPHC (1060 AM).

In March 1984, license holder Robert M. McKay Jr., (doing business as Humphreys County Broadcasting Company) agreed to sell WVRY and WPHC to Mid-Cummberland Communications, Inc. The FCC approved the joint sale on May 24, 1984, and the deal was completed on July 12, 1984.

In May 1988, WVRY management applied to the FCC for permission to change the station's frequency to 105.1 MHz, increase the effective radiated power to 50,000 watts, raise the height above average terrain of the antenna to 150 meters (490 ft), and change class to C2. The FCC issued the station a construction permit to make these changes on November 23, 1988, with a scheduled expiration date on May 23, 1990. Construction and testing were completed in June 1989, so a new broadcast license application to cover these changes was submitted. The FCC granted the new license on June 14, 1990.

In November 1996, Mid-Cumberland Communications, Inc., reached a deal to sell WVRY and WPHC to Reach Satellite Network, Inc. The FCC approved the combo deal on November 27, 1996, and the sale was completed on December 12, 1997. Within days, the new owners sold AM station WPHC to Canaan Communications, Inc., an area religious broadcaster.

In December 1999, the stockholders of Reach Satellite Network agreed to sell the company and its broadcast assets to Salem Communications. At the time of the sale, Reach Satellite Network held the broadcast licenses for WVRY and WBOZ (104.9 FM in Woodbury, Tennessee). The FCC approved the transfer of control on February 15, 2000, and completion of the transaction took place on March 31, 2000. On March 9, 2007, Salem sold WVRY to Grace Broadcasting Services, for a total of $900,000. The deal gained FCC approval on May 23, 2007, and was completed on May 29, 2007. On May 1, 2013, WVRY was sold to JWL Communications for $1 million.

In 2016, the station was acquired by MP Media for an undisclosed purchase price. After briefly stunting as Trump 105.1, playing songs vaguely related to Donald Trump, the station flipped to classic country as 105.1 The Wolf.

On February 7, 2018, Ashland City-based WVWK (formerly WJNA, now WNTC) began simulcasting WVWF's programming. That station has since relaunched separate original programming.

On June 10, 2019, the station changed its call sign to WBWR. On June 14, 2019, Mike Parchman's Consolidated Media LLC consummated the purchase of the station from Cumberland Radio Partners for $1. WBWR changed its call sign back to WVWF on June 18, 2019, to WVWB on January 9, 2020, and to WOWQ on July 26, 2021.

On December 22, 2021, WOWQ changed its format from classic country to adult hits, branded as "105.1 The Train". The call sign changed again to WLFN on June 3, 2022, after the station effectively reverted the change at that time and flipped to country as "The Wolf", and to WJZM on January 23, 2024.

On January 21, 2025, almost exactly a year after the last callsign change, the station dropped the country format (which would move to an online webstream on the former website, shifting to a classic country focus) and began stunting with various loops of songs (specifically, first "Take This Job and Shove It" by Johnny Paycheck, then "May The Bird of Paradise Fly Up Your Nose" by Little Jimmy Dickens, then "The Door" by Teddy Swims, then "Jungle Love" by The Time); at 5:30 PM on the 24th, the stunt shifted to a jockless contemporary hit radio format, with the first song under the temp format being "Good Luck, Babe!" by Chappell Roan. On the 24th, during the stunting period, the station announced it would flip to adult contemporary, branded simply as "105.1 WJZM".

=== The Original WJZM ===
WJZM began in the early 1940s, when radio included everything from serialized dramas and weekly sermons to news and live sports.

The premiere broadcast on Sunday, Oct. 14, 1941, began at 9 a.m. with a Sunday School lesson from First Baptist Church by Pastor Richard N. Owen, then a sermon by the Rev. W.L. McColgan of First Presbyterian Church, according to Leaf-Chronicle archives. Then followed addresses by Montgomery County Judge John T. Cunningham; Charles V. Runyon, representing Mayor William Kleeman; and H.D. Pettus and C.W. Bailey, representing the Clarksville Chamber of Commerce. From there, the station offered a wide variety of daily programming, starting at 6 a.m. and signing off at 11 p.m., according to 1941 listings. Local programs included shows such as "Clarksville Calling" and "Sports Spotlight", supplemented by syndicated shows from the Mutual Broadcasting System such as "White House Conference", "Ned Jordan, Secret Agent" and "Morton Gould’s Orchestra".

The station, which was the first radio station, WNZE licensed in Clarksville by the Federal Communications Commission, was granted a construction permit as WJZM on February 19, 1941. It was originally slated to broadcast at 1370 kilocycles, but the permit was modified to reassign the station to 1400 kilocycles as part of the North American Regional Broadcasting Agreement. WJZM signed on the air as Clarksville's pioneer station at 9 a.m. on the morning of October 14, 1941. The station offered a wide variety of programming in its early years, broadcasting a 17-hour schedule each day. For much of its first 60 years on the air, the station had an affiliation with the Mutual Broadcasting System.

Local businessman Hank Bonecutter, who started his radio career at WJZM in 1973, purchased the station in 1994 under the business name Cumberland Radio Partners, Inc., which he sold to a group of other local businessmen in 2012. The call signs were changed in 2018.

Cumberland Radio Partners, Inc became a part of Consolidated Media, LLC in 2019 and in 2021 the station was sold to Saga Communications.

The WJZM call signs were on AM1400 from 1941 until 2018.

=== Notable Figures ===
Actor Frank Sutton began his broadcasting career at WJZM in 1942, as a Radio Announcer after moving back to Clarksville upon his graduation at East High School in Nashville. He was fired after the owner heard only static when tuning in one morning.

Actor, Senator and Former Presidential Candidate Fred Thompson frequented WJZM as an air guest.

== Former logos ==
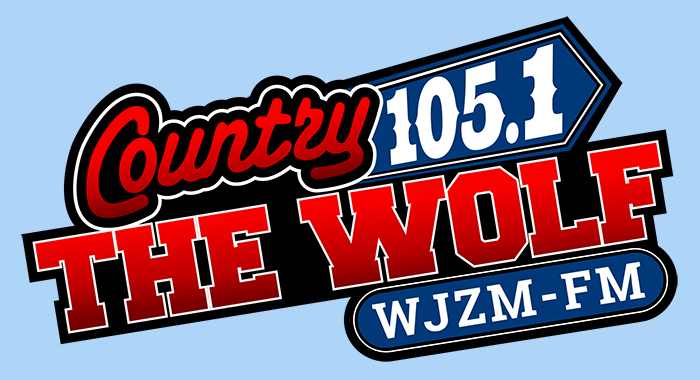
Country 105-1 The Wolf WJZM logo

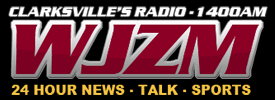
News Talk 1400 WJZM logo

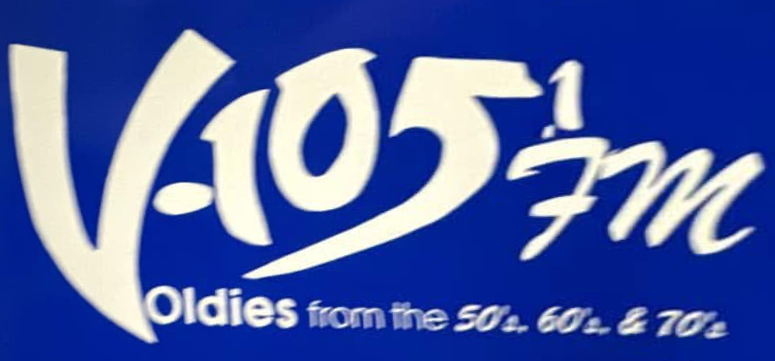
Oldies 105.1 WVRY logo

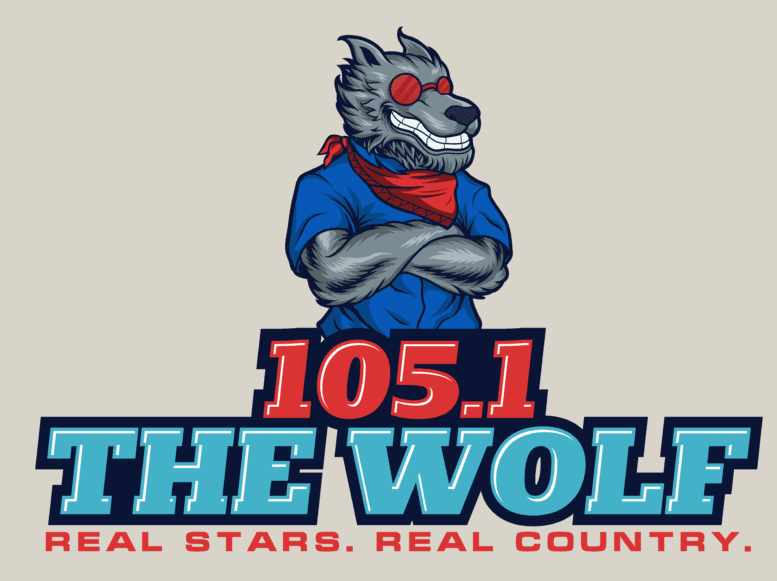
Real Stars. Real Country 105.1 The Wolf logo

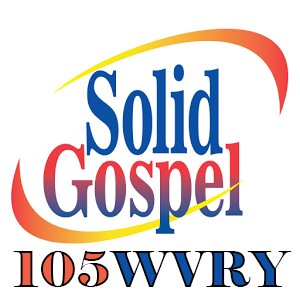
Solid Gospel 105 WVRY logo

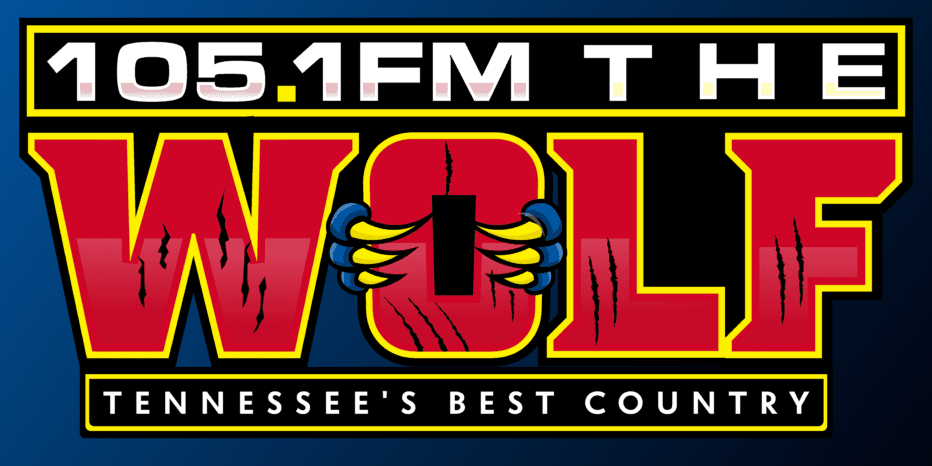
Tennessee's Best Country 105.1 The Wolf logo

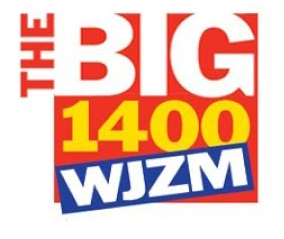
The Big 1400 WJZM logo

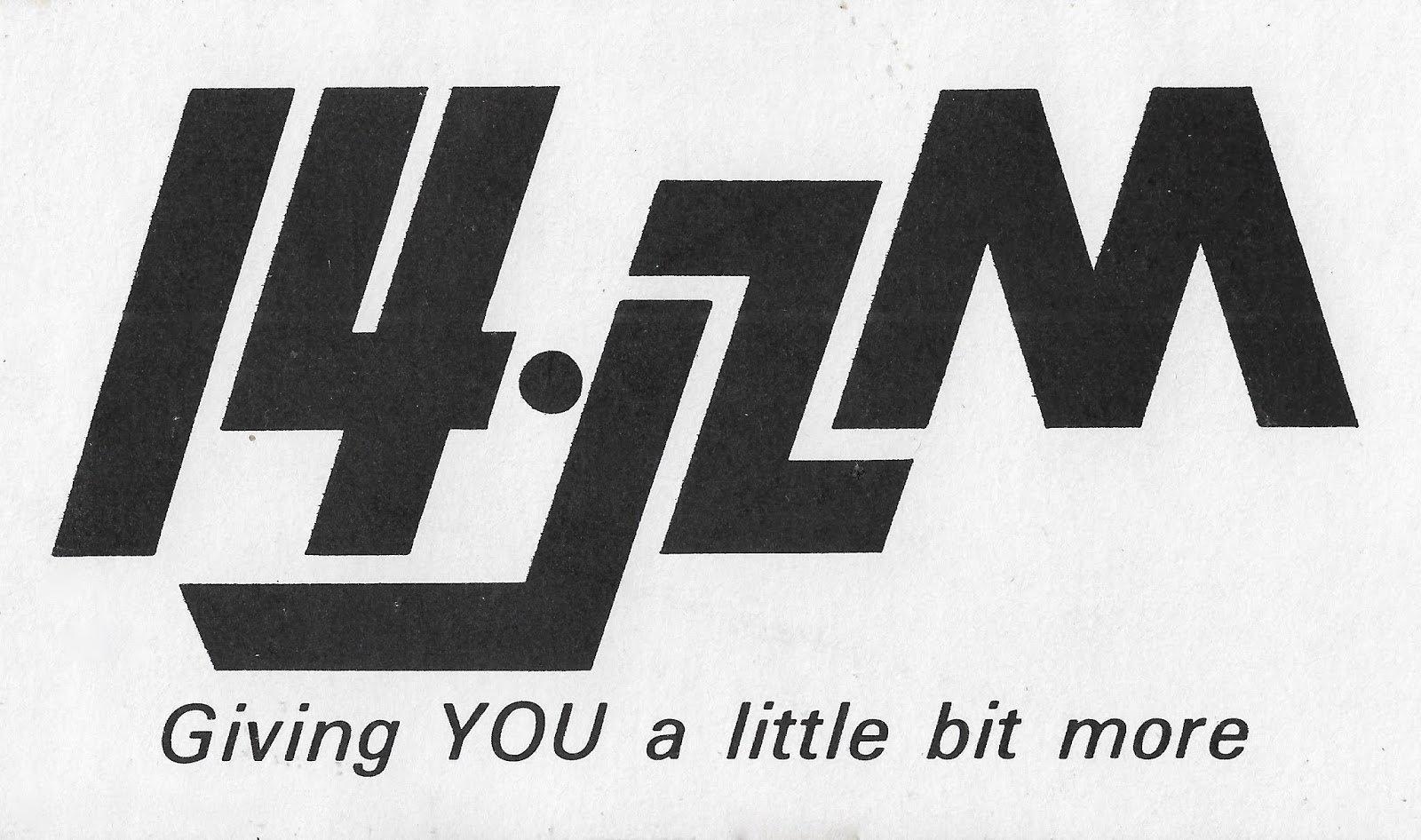
Top40 14JZM logo

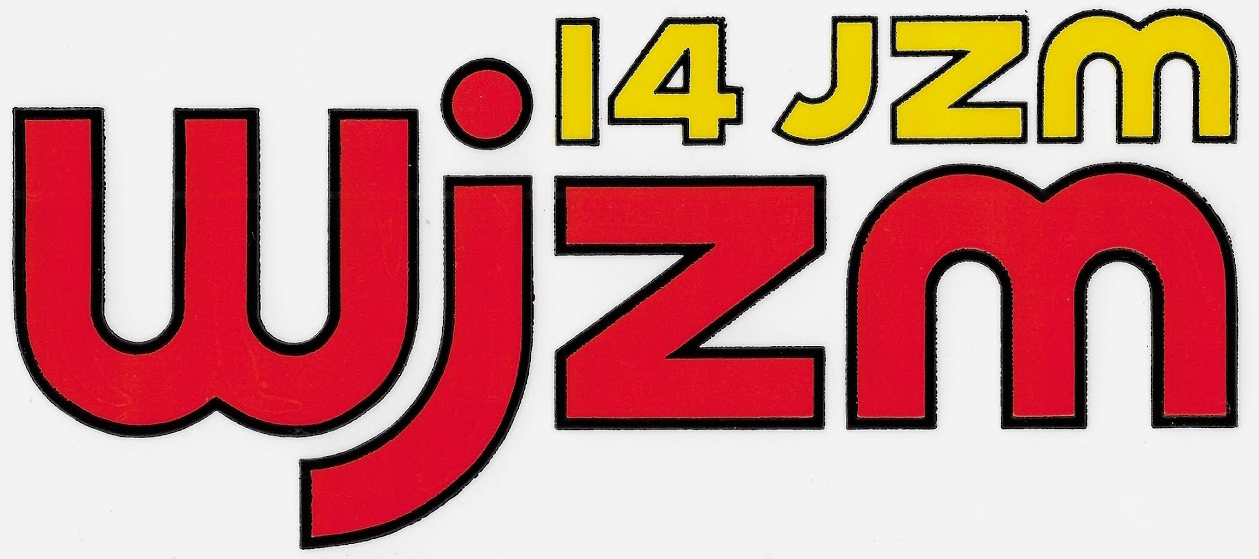
Top40 14JZM logo
