= WBBJ-TV =

Television station in Jackson, Tennessee

- Jackson, Tennessee; United States
- Channels: Digital: 35 (UHF); Virtual: 7
- Branding: WBBJ ABC 7; WBBJ CBS 7 (7.3); WBBJ 7 Eyewitness News

Programming
- Affiliations: 7.1: ABC; 7.3: CBS; for others, see § Subchannels

Ownership
- Owner: Gray Media; (Gray Television Licensee, LLC)

History
- First air date: March 6, 1955
- Former call signs: WDXI-TV (1955–1966)
- Former channel numbers: Analog: 7 (VHF, 1955–2009); Digital: 43 (UHF, 1999–2020)
- Former affiliations: CBS (1955–1967)
- Call sign meaning: For former owner, Bahakel Broadcasting of Jackson

Technical information
- Licensing authority: FCC
- Facility ID: 65204
- ERP: 857 kW
- HAAT: 303 m (994 ft)
- Transmitter coordinates: 35°38′16″N 88°41′33″W

Links
- Public license information: Public file; LMS
- Website: www.wbbjtv.com

WBBJ-TV (channel 7) is a television station in Jackson, Tennessee, United States, affiliated with ABC and CBS. Owned by Gray Media, the station maintains studios on Muse Street in Jackson, and its transmitter is located on Potts Chapel Road in unincorporated eastern Madison County.

== History ==
The station signed on March 6, 1955, as WDXI-TV, Jackson's first television station. It operated an analog signal on VHF channel 7, and was a CBS affiliate owned by Aaron Robinson along with WDXI radio (1310 AM). Cy Bahakel bought the station in 1966 and changed the call letters to the current WBBJ-TV on December 7, 1966 (as Robinson's estate held on to WDXI radio). Since then, WBBJ has had the longest ownership tenure of any station in Tennessee, surpassing stations in much larger markets in the state.

When the station changed its calls to WBBJ, it also simultaneously dropped CBS in favor of ABC (which WDXI-TV had carried as a secondary affiliation for some time beforehand). By the end of 1967, Bahakel's other stations it owned at the time, WABG in Mississippi, WCCB in Charlotte, and WOLO in Columbia were all affiliated with ABC. Since 1967 until the launch of WBBJ's CBS-affiliated subchannel, Jackson has received CBS programming from WREC-TV/WREG-TV in Memphis. Like many of the stations that operated in analog on channel 7, the station has used various versions of the circle 7 logo over the years; since 2003, WBBJ has used the original, ABC-trademarked version. Area viewers can also see ABC programming over-the-air in some areas from WATN-TV in Memphis, but that outlet is not carried by local cable providers.

On December 16, 2025, it was announced that WBBJ-TV would be sold to Gray Media for $8.25 million (which is $6.25 million for the television assets and $2 million for the physical broadcast property of its studios on Muse Street); this would make it a sister station to NBC affiliates WMC-TV in Memphis and WSMV-TV in Nashville. The sale was completed on February 13, 2026.

=== WBBJ-DT3 (CBS) and WBBJ-DT4 (MeTV) ===
On January 1, 2012, WBBJ-DT3 became the area's CBS affiliate, bringing the network back to the market (and back to WBBJ, which carried the network until 1967). Between January 1, 2012, and September 2021, WBBJ-DT3 had served as a dual CBS/MeTV affiliate, offering programming from the MeTV service during select hours (on weekday afternoons and during overnight hours on weekends), in addition to the CBS affiliation, until MeTV programming was moved to a new fourth subchannel, which airs its full schedule uninterrupted. Prior to its CBS affiliation, WBBJ-DT3 served as a 24-hour live feed of a NOAA National Weather Service Doppler weather radar with audio from NOAA Weather Radio.

== News operation ==
On August 1, 2007, WBBJ debuted new graphics, logo, music, and an updated weather set. The station, which had been using Frank Gari's "Image News" music package since 1999, switched to "In-Sink" by Nashville-based company 615 Music. Also on this date, the weeknight 5 p.m. newscast dropped the Live at 5 branding and returned to ABC 7 Eyewitness News at 5 which is simulcast on local radio station WFHU (91.5 FM). The ninety-minute weekday morning show became Good Morning West Tennessee.

In addition to network and syndicated programming, there are local newscast offerings on WBBJ-DT3 through simulcasts with the main channel and broadcasts in new time slots. It offers local news weekdays at noon for thirty minutes as well as weeknights at 5:30 and 6:30 seen exclusively on the CBS subchannel. As a result, CBS Evening News airs weeknights at 6 p.m., which is a half-hour later than most affiliates in the Central Time Zone.

On January 23, 2013, the station debuted a brand new set that has a working newsroom behind the main anchor desk. Also, the new set shows the Circle 7 logo, but no longer features the ABC logo, since the station is affiliated with both ABC and CBS.

=== Notable former on-air staff ===
- Courtney Friel – news anchor
- Lew Jetton – reporter, weather, and sports anchor
- Anne Pressly – reporter (one month at WBBJ)

== Technical information ==
=== Subchannels ===
The station's signal is multiplexed:

Subchannels of WBBJ-TV
Subchannel	Res.	Short name	Programming
7.1	720p	WBBJ-DT	ABC
7.2	480i	MESN	Midsouth SEN (WMC-TV)
7.3	720p	WBBJCBS	CBS
7.4	480i	WBBJ-Me	MeTV

Simulcast of subchannel of another station

=== Analog-to-digital conversion ===
WBBJ-TV shut down its analog signal, over VHF channel 7, on June 12, 2009, as part of the federally mandated transition from analog broadcasts to digital broadcasts.
