= WKBQ =

Coordinates: 35.587°N 89.639°W

- Covington, Tennessee; United States
- Broadcast area: Memphis, Tennessee
- Frequency: 93.5 MHz
- Branding: US 51 Country 93.5 FM

Programming
- Format: Country

Ownership
- Owner: Charles Ennis; (Grace Broadcasting Services, Inc.)
- Sister stations: WKBL

History
- First air date: 1965 (as WKBL-FM)
- Former call signs: WKBL-FM (1965–1999)

Technical information
- Licensing authority: FCC
- Facility ID: 57886
- Class: A
- ERP: 6,000 watts
- HAAT: 100 meters (330 ft)

Links
- Public license information: Public file; LMS
- Webcast: Listen live
- Website: us51country.com

WKBQ (93.5 FM) is a country music radio station in Covington, Tennessee, and serving the Memphis, Tennessee area, owned by Charles Ennis through licensee Grace Broadcasting Services, Inc.

== History ==
WKBQ first signed on the air as WKBL-FM in 1965 with a country music format until 1999 when it switched to an adult top 40 format and adopted the WKBQ call sign. In 2007, it returned to country.

The WKBQ call sign was previously used for many years by a top 40 radio station serving the St. Louis Missouri/Illinois market. That station is now licensed as WARH.
