= WYJJ (FM) =

Urban contemporary radio station in Trenton, Tennessee, United States

- Trenton, Tennessee; United States
- Broadcast area: Jackson, Tennessee
- Frequency: 97.7 MHz
- Branding: JJ 97.7

Programming
- Format: Urban adult contemporary
- Affiliations: Premiere Networks

Ownership
- Owner: Forever Communications; (Forever South Licenses, LLC)
- Sister stations: WHHG, WOGY, WTJF, WTJF-FM

History
- First air date: August 1980 (as WTNE-FM)
- Former call signs: WTNE-FM (1980–1983); WLOT (1983–1993); WWEZ (1993–2000); WTNE-FM (2000–2009); WTGP (2009–2012)
- Call sign meaning: We're Your Jackson Joy

Technical information
- Licensing authority: FCC
- Facility ID: 54899
- Class: C2
- ERP: 34,000 watts
- HAAT: 123 meters (404 ft)
- Transmitter coordinates: 35°44′35.00″N 88°59′19.00″W

Links
- Public license information: Public file; LMS
- Webcast: Listen Live
- Website: www.radio731.com/stations/jj-97-7/

WYJJ (97.7 MHz, "JJ 97.7") is an FM radio station broadcasting an urban adult contemporary format. Licensed to Trenton, Tennessee, United States, the station serves the Jackson, Tennessee area. The station is currently owned by Forever Communications through Forever South Licenses, LLC.

== History ==
The station was assigned the call sign WLOT on May 10, 1983. On February 15, 1993, the station changed its call sign to WWEZ, on December 11, 2000, to WTNE-FM, on September 23, 2009, to WTGP, and on September 15, 2012, to the current WYJJ.

On September 15, 2012, WTGP changed its format from contemporary Christian (as "The Dove") to urban adult contemporary, branded as "JJ 97.7" under the new call letters WYJJ.
