= WTJK =

Coordinates: 35.845°N 88.902°W

- Humboldt, Tennessee; United States
- Broadcast area: Jackson, Tennessee
- Frequency: 105.3 MHz
- Branding: K 105.3

Programming
- Format: Classic Hits

Ownership
- Owner: Grace Broadcasting, Inc.
- Sister stations: WTJS (FM), WKBQ, WKBL

History
- First air date: 1988; 38 years ago
- Former call signs: WLSZ (1988–2008); WTJW (2008–2012); WDVW (2012–2014); WHPP (2014–2018)

Technical information
- Licensing authority: FCC
- Facility ID: 6583
- Class: A
- ERP: 4,700 watts
- HAAT: 95 meters (312 ft)

Links
- Public license information: Public file; LMS
- Webcast: Listen Live

WTJK (105.3 FM) is a Classic Hits formatted broadcast radio station licensed to Humboldt, Tennessee, United States.

WTJK serves the Jackson, Tennessee listening area, and is owned by Grace Broadcasting Services, Inc.

== History ==
On September 15, 2012, the then-WTJW changed its format from news/talk to contemporary Christian, branded as "The Dove", under new call sign, WDVW.

On January 1, 2015, WDVW flipped to classic hits as "Hippie Radio 105.3", with a call sign change to WHPP. The station changed its call sign to WTJK on January 9, 2018. On January 15, 2018, WTJK changed its format from classic hits to talk.

On April 20, 2018, WTJK changed its format from talk (which moved to WTJS 93.1 FM Alamo) to sports, branded as "Fox Sports Jackson".

On September 14, 2022, WTJK changed its format from sports (which moved to WJPJ 1190 AM Humboldt) to Regional Mexican, branded as "La Poderosa 105.3".

On April 8, 2024 WTJK flipped back formats to Sports as it was originally on WTJK 105.3 from 2018 to 2022. La Poderosa that was originally on WTJK 105.3 has moved to WJPJ 1190 AM & 99.9 FM Humboldt.

On May 25, 2025 WTJK flipped formats from Sports as (Fox Sports Jackson) to Classic Hits branded as "K 105.3". WTJK is simulcasting with sister station WKBL AM 1250.
