= WTJF (AM) =

Radio station in Jackson, Tennessee

- Jackson, Tennessee; United States
- Frequency: 1390 kHz
- Branding: Sports Radio 94FM & 1390AM

Programming
- Format: Sports radio
- Affiliations: ESPN Radio

Ownership
- Owner: Forever Communications; (Forever South Licenses, LLC)
- Sister stations: WHHG, WOGY, WTJF-FM, WYJJ

History
- First air date: 1931 (as WTJS)
- Former call signs: WTJS (1931–2017); WLLI (2017–2020)
- Call sign meaning: Variation of former WTJS calls

Technical information
- Licensing authority: FCC
- Facility ID: 14742
- Class: B
- Power: 5,000 watts day 1,000 watts night
- Transmitter coordinates: 35.6461°N 88.8325°W
- Translator: 94.1 W231BU (East Union)
- Repeater: 94.3 WTJF-FM (Dyer)

Links
- Public license information: Public file; LMS
- Webcast: Listen live
- Website: www.radio731.com/stations/sportsradio/

WTJF (1390 AM) is a Sports formatted radio station. Licensed to Jackson, Tennessee, United States, the station is owned by Forever Communications, through licensee Forever South Licenses, LLC.

== History ==
The station, under the WTJS calls, was the first radio station in Jackson, Tennessee, and the entire West Tennessee area excluding Memphis and was the beacon that made Jackson the center hub of what is called the Golden Circle Area. In the 1930s, people listened to WTJS for farm programming, live radio shows and the latest news updates. Being a wide-reaching advertising medium, WTJS enticed listeners from 22 counties to shop in Jackson, thus the genesis of the "Hub City".

On January 16, 2017, WTJS flipped to classic country as Willie 94, in simulcast with 94.3 WDYE. The station changed its call letters to WLLI.

After stunting with Christmas music as Rudolph Radio, on December 30, 2020, WLLI flipped to conservative talk as "Tennessee Patriot Network", changing its call letters to WTJF. WTJF also readded the 94.3 simulcast. The conservative talk programming, subsequently rebranded "The TJ Network", was replaced with a sports radio format, primarily featuring ESPN Radio programming, on January 1, 2024.
