= WNZE =

Radio station in Clarksville, Tennessee

- Clarksville, Tennessee; United States
- Broadcast area: Clarksville–Hopkinsville
- Frequency: 1400 kHz
- Branding: 105.5 The Patriot

Programming
- Format: Conservative talk
- Affiliations: Fox News Radio; Compass Media Networks; Premiere Networks; Westwood One

Ownership
- Owner: Saga Communications; (Saga Communications of Tuckessee, LLC)
- Sister stations: WCVQ; WKFN; WQEZ; WRND; WVVR; WZZP

History
- First air date: October 14, 1941
- Former call signs: WJZM (1941–2018); WVWB (2018–2019); WWNZ (2019–2020); WVWF (January–July 2020); WBQL (2020–2021)

Technical information
- Licensing authority: FCC
- Facility ID: 12495
- Class: C
- Power: 380 watts
- Transmitter coordinates: 36°30′57.00″N 87°20′57.00″W
- Translator: 105.5 W288DQ (Clarksville)

Links
- Public license information: Public file; LMS
- Webcast: Listen Live
- Website: patriot1055.com

WNZE (1400 AM, "105.5 The Patriot") is a radio station broadcasting a conservative talk format. Licensed to Clarksville, Tennessee, United States, the station serves the Clarksville–Hopkinsville area. The station is owned by Saga Communications, through licensee Saga Communications of Tuckessee, LLC, and operates as part of its Five Star Media Group.

== History ==
The station, which was the first radio station to be licensed in Clarksville by the Federal Communications Commission, was granted a construction permit as WJZM on February 19, 1941. It was originally slated to broadcast at 1370 kilocycles, but the permit was modified to reassign the station to 1400 kilocycles as part of the North American Regional Broadcasting Agreement. WJZM signed on the air as Clarksville's pioneer station at 9 a.m. on the morning of October 14, 1941. The station offered a wide variety of programming in its early years, broadcasting a 17-hour schedule each day. For much of its first 60 years on the air, the station had an affiliation with the Mutual Broadcasting System.

Local businessman Hank Bonecutter, who started his radio career at WJZM in 1973, purchased the station in 1994 under the business name Cumberland Radio Partners, Inc., which he sold to a group of other local businessmen in 2012.

In 2018, the station's callsign was changed to WVWB, and became a country music station after many years serving as a News/Talk station. The station launched FM translator W288DQ (105.5 MHz) to simulcast the AM signal for FM users. Two more callsign changes occurred; the station became WWNZ in 2019, and then WVWF in January 2020. After the station was sold to Saga Communications, Inc., the station's callsign was changed to WBQL in 2020.

On March 17, 2021, WNZE changed its format from country to conservative talk, branded as "NewZee 105.5". On January 8, 2024, WNZE rebranded as "105.5 The Patriot".

== Programming ==
Two local programs are broadcast: Good Morning Clarksville (Monday-Friday, 6-9 AM) and SportsTalk with Justin Swallows (Monday-Friday, 3-6 PM). The station also carries most Clarksville Academy high school football and boys' basketball games. In addition to local offerings, WNZE serves as an affiliate of the University of Tennessee Vol Network for football and both men's and women's basketball. For decades, the station was an affiliate of the Atlanta Braves Radio Network, but dropped the affiliation before the 2018 baseball season.
