= Carroll County, Tennessee =

County in Tennessee, United States

- County
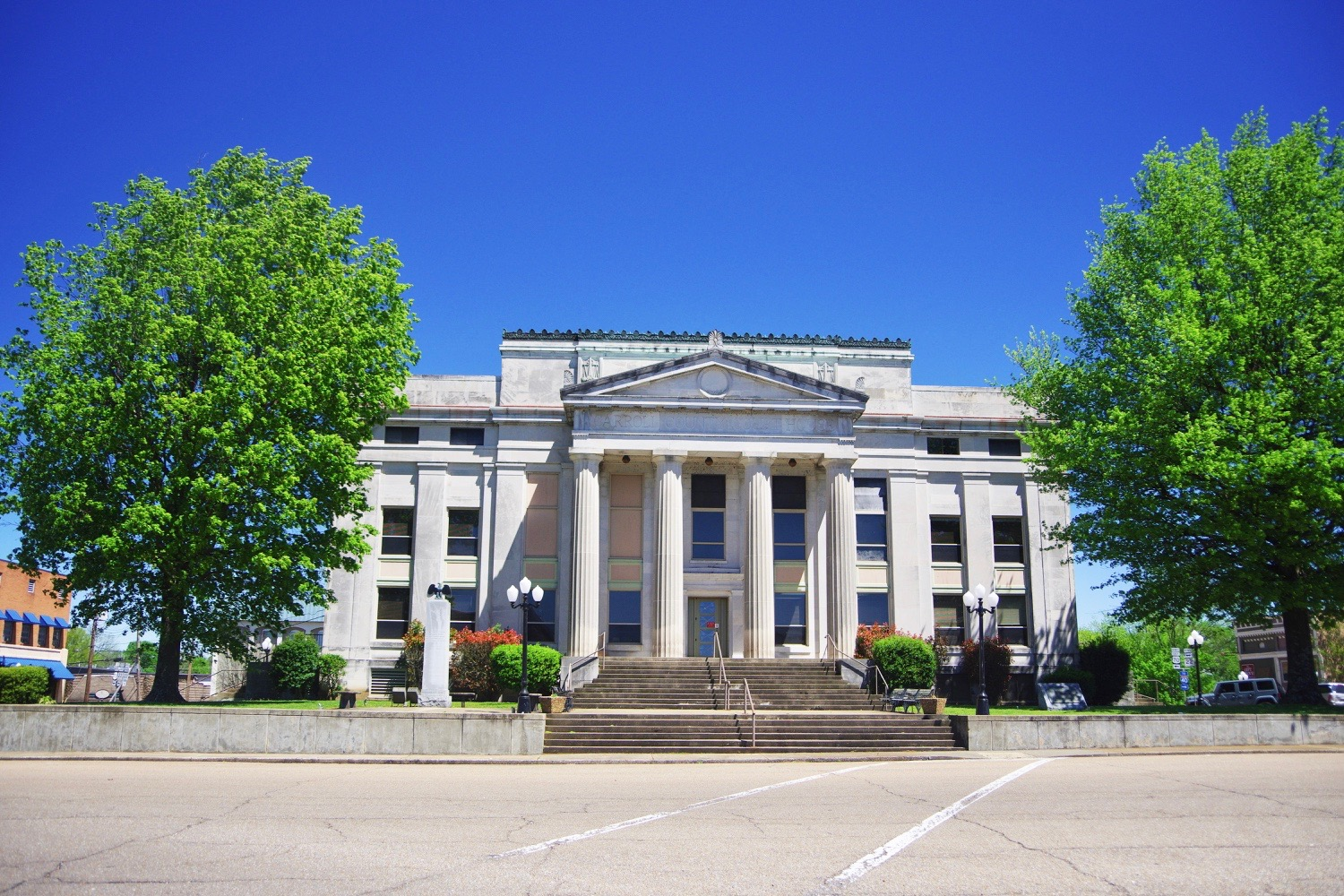
- Carroll County Courthouse in Huntingdon

- Location within the U.S. state of Tennessee
- Coordinates: 35°59′N 88°27′W
- Country: United States
- State: Tennessee
- Founded: November 7, 1821
- Named for: William Carroll
- Seat: Huntingdon
- Largest city: McKenzie

Area
  - Total: 600 sq mi (1,600 km^{2})
  - Land: 599 sq mi (1,550 km^{2})
  - Water: 0.8 sq mi (2.1 km^{2}) 0.1%

Population (2020)
  - Total: 28,440
  - Estimate (2025): 29,200 ▲
  - Density: 48/sq mi (19/km^{2})
- Time zone: UTC−6 (Central)
  - Summer (DST): UTC−5 (CDT)
- Congressional district: 8th
- Website: carrollcountytn.gov

Carroll County is a county located in the western division of the U.S. state of Tennessee. As of the 2020 census, the population was 28,440. Its county seat is Huntingdon. The county was established by the Tennessee General Assembly on November 7, 1821, and was named for Governor William Carroll.

== Geography ==
According to the U.S. Census Bureau, the county has a total area of 600 square miles (1,600 km^{2}), of which 599 square miles (1,550 km^{2}) is land and 0.8 square miles (2.1 km^{2}) (0.1%) is water.

=== Adjacent counties ===
- Henry County (northeast)
- Benton County (east)
- Decatur County (southeast)
- Henderson County (south)
- Madison County (southwest)
- Gibson County (west)
- Weakley County (northwest)

=== State protected areas ===
- Harts Mill Wetland Wildlife Management Area (part)
- Jarrell Switch Refuge
- Natchez Trace State Forest (part)
- Natchez Trace State Park (part)

== Demographics ==
Historical population
Census	Pop.	Note	%±
1830	9,397		—
1840	12,362		31.6%
1850	15,967		29.2%
1860	17,437		9.2%
1870	19,447		11.5%
1880	22,103		13.7%
1890	23,630		6.9%
1900	24,250		2.6%
1910	23,971		−1.2%
1920	24,361		1.6%
1930	26,132		7.3%
1940	25,978		−0.6%
1950	26,553		2.2%
1960	23,476		−11.6%
1970	25,741		9.6%
1980	28,285		9.9%
1990	27,514		−2.7%
2000	29,475		7.1%
2010	28,522		−3.2%
2020	28,440		−0.3%
2025 (est.)	29,200	▲	2.7%
U.S. Decennial Census; 1790-1960 1900-1990; 1990-2000 2010-2014

=== 2020 census ===
Carroll county racial Composition
Race	Num.	Perc.
White (non-Hispanic)	23,744	83.49%
Black or African American (non-Hispanic)	2,445	8.6%
Native American	75	0.26%
Asian	124	0.44%
Pacific Islander	5	0.02%
Other/Mixed	1,278	4.49%
Hispanic or Latino	769	2.7%

As of the 2020 census, the county had a population of 28,440, and the median age was 43.3 years. 20.9% of residents were under the age of 18 and 21.3% of residents were 65 years of age or older. For every 100 females there were 94.8 males, and for every 100 females age 18 and over there were 91.6 males.

The racial makeup of the county was 84.4% White, 8.6% Black or African American, 0.3% American Indian and Alaska Native, 0.4% Asian, <0.1% Native Hawaiian and Pacific Islander, 1.2% from some other race, and 5.0% from two or more races. Hispanic or Latino residents of any race comprised 2.7% of the population.

The 2020 census indicated that 17.9% of residents lived in urban areas, while 82.1% lived in rural areas.

There were 11,446 households in the county, of which 27.3% had children under the age of 18 living in them. Of all households, 47.5% were married-couple households, 18.2% were households with a male householder and no spouse or partner present, and 28.1% were households with a female householder and no spouse or partner present. About 29.9% of all households were made up of individuals and 14.6% had someone living alone who was 65 years of age or older.

There were 13,084 housing units, of which 12.5% were vacant. Among occupied housing units, 73.9% were owner-occupied and 26.1% were renter-occupied. The homeowner vacancy rate was 1.6% and the rental vacancy rate was 9.7%.

=== 2000 census ===
As of the census of 2000, there were 29,475 people, 11,779 households, and 8,398 families residing in the county. The population density was 49 people per square mile (19 people/km^{2}). There were 13,057 housing units at an average density of 22 units per square mile (8.5/km^{2}). The racial makeup of the county was 87.68% White, 10.35% Black or African American, 0.24% Native American, 0.16% Asian, 0.02% Pacific Islander, 0.45% from other races, and 1.10% from two or more races. 1.41% of the population were Hispanic or Latino of any race.

There were 11,779 households, out of which 30.00% had children under the age of 18 living with them, 56.30% were married couples living together, 11.50% had a female householder with no husband present, and 28.70% were non-families. 25.80% of all households were made up of individuals, and 12.70% had someone living alone who was 65 years of age or older. The average household size was 2.42 and the average family size was 2.90.

In the county, the population was spread out, with 23.20% under the age of 18, 8.40% from 18 to 24, 26.70% from 25 to 44, 24.40% from 45 to 64, and 17.30% who were 65 years of age or older. The median age was 39 years. For every 100 females there were 92.30 males. For every 100 females age 18 and over, there were 89.80 males.

The median income for a household in the county was $30,463, and the median income for a family was $36,880. Males had a median income of $29,904 versus $20,024 for females. The per capita income for the county was $16,251. About 10.90% of families and 13.90% of the population were below the poverty line, including 17.90% of those under age 18 and 13.40% of those age 65 or over.

== Transportation ==
The Carroll County Airport is a county-owned public-use airport located four nautical miles (4.6 mi; 7.4 km) northwest of the central business district of Huntingdon, Tennessee.

== Media ==
=== Radio stations ===
- WRQR-FM 105.5 "Today's Best Music with Ace & TJ in the Morning"
- WTPR-AM 710 "The Greatest Hits of All Time"
- WTPR-FM 101.7 "The Greatest Hits of All Time"
- WEIO "100.9 The Farm"
- WHDM 1440-AM 98.9-FM
- WAJJ 89.3 FM Christian Radio "The J"

=== Newspapers ===
- Carroll County News-Leader
- The McKenzie Banner
- Tennessee Magnet Publications

=== Online News Publications ===
- Carroll County Observer

== Communities ==
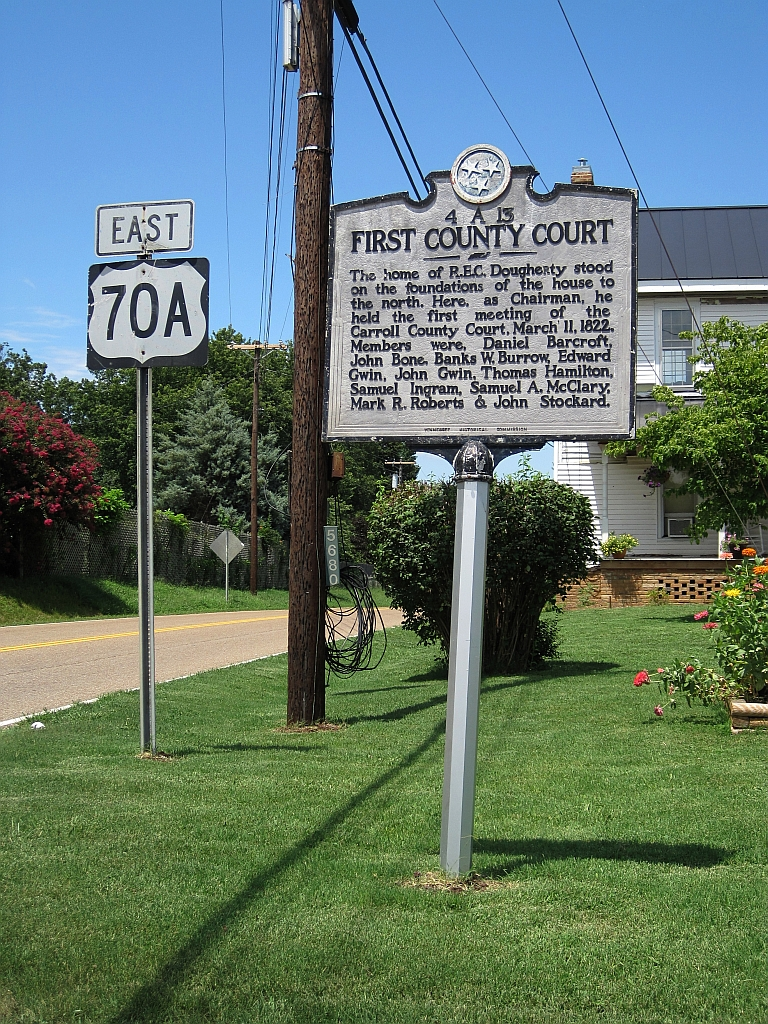
McLemoresville

=== City ===
- McKenzie (small portions in Henry County and Weakley County)

=== Towns ===
- Atwood
- Bruceton
- Clarksburg
- Hollow Rock
- Huntingdon (county seat)
- McLemoresville
- Trezevant

=== Census-designated places ===
- Lavinia
- Yuma

=== Unincorporated communities ===
- Buena Vista
- Cedar Grove
- Christmasville
- Hopewell
- Lavinia
- Leach
- Westport

== Politics ==
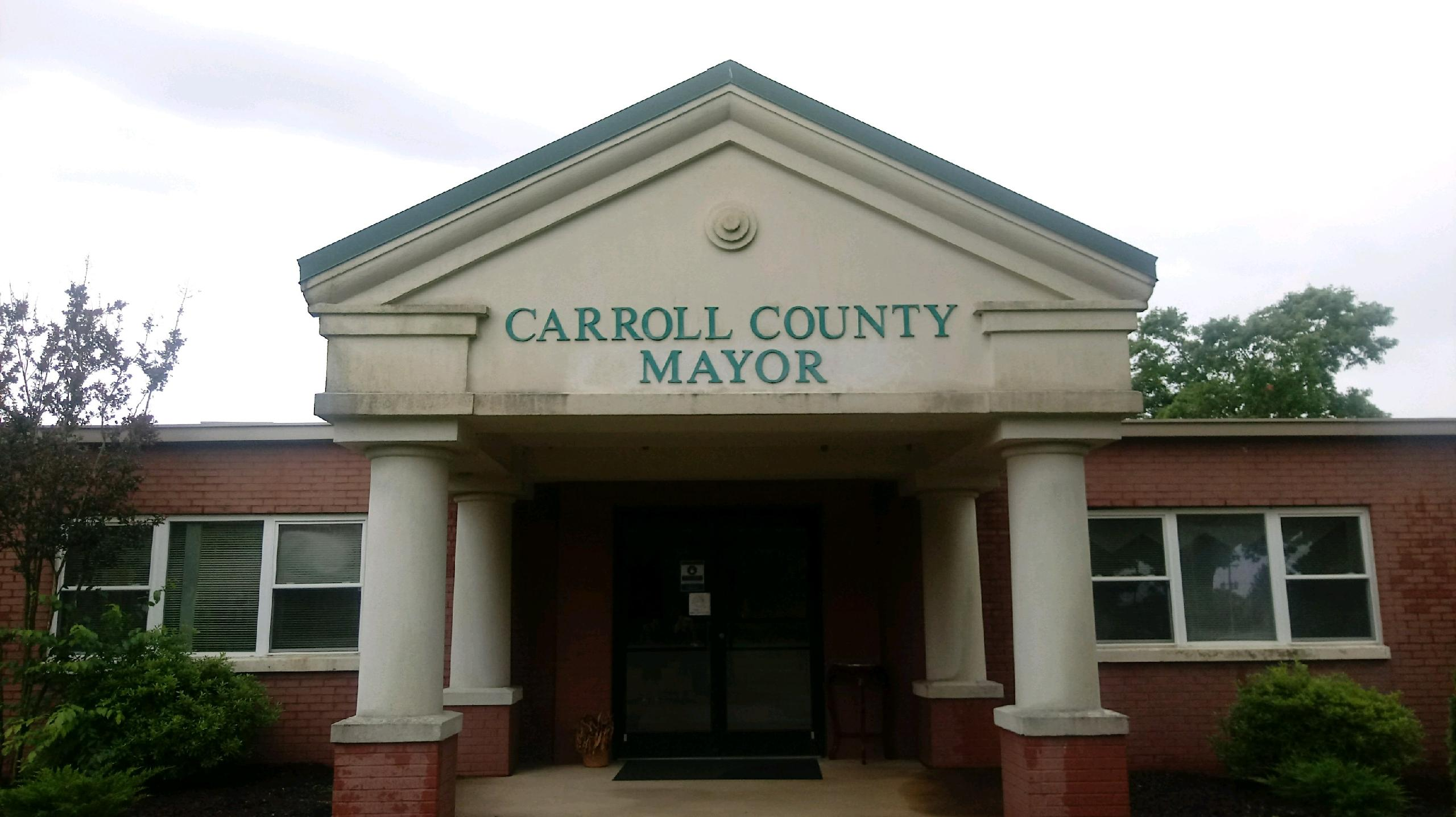
Carroll County's mayoral office

In the 21st century, Carroll County is overwhelmingly Republican. In general, the alignment of voters with the two major parties has shifted since the late 20th century, but Carroll County had a different history. Conservative whites in the upland and Deep South largely shifted away from the Democratic Party in the late 20th century to the Republican Party, but Carroll County had only briefly supported Democratic presidential candidates in the 20th century: 1912, when Southerner Woodrow Wilson was elected; from 1932 to 1948, for Franklin D. Roosevelt and Harry Truman during the Depression and years of World War II and after, and Southerners Lyndon B. Johnson in 1964, Jimmy Carter in 1976, and Bill Clinton in 1992–1996.

But at the time of the American Civil War and for decades after, Carroll was the northernmost county in the Unionist Republican bloc, made up of Wayne, Henderson, Hardin and McNairy counties, within historically Democratic West Tennessee. The whites in this bloc were yeomen farmers who owned few slaves; most identified as Unionist. In Tennessee's Ordinance of Secession referendum on June 8, 1861, Carroll County voted to remain in the Union by a margin of 1,349 to 967, whilst earlier on February 9, 1861, county voters voted against holding a secession convention by a margin of 1,495 to 678. Historians note that the enclave developed this way because, unlike in the fertile Delta, this region of the Highland Rim had soils that were shallow, humus-poor and easily erodible. Settlers who were poor could acquire land here, as the area could not support the plantations more typical of Middle and West Tennessee, which were dependent on the labor of enslaved African Americans.

United States presidential election results for Carroll County, Tennessee
Year	Republican		Democratic		Third party(ies)	
Year	No.	%	No.	%	No.	%
1912	1,362	33.62%	1,653	40.80%	1,036	25.57%
1916	2,217	52.05%	2,001	46.98%	41	0.96%
1920	4,141	56.29%	3,215	43.71%	0	0.00%
1924	2,199	51.61%	1,962	46.05%	100	2.35%
1928	2,981	62.80%	1,743	36.72%	23	0.48%
1932	2,505	48.58%	2,603	50.48%	48	0.93%
1936	2,282	42.87%	2,989	56.15%	52	0.98%
1940	2,782	49.31%	2,830	50.16%	30	0.53%
1944	2,996	58.88%	2,077	40.82%	15	0.29%
1948	2,651	42.95%	2,818	45.65%	704	11.40%
1952	3,741	56.46%	2,841	42.88%	44	0.66%
1956	4,235	55.80%	3,232	42.58%	123	1.62%
1960	4,517	59.36%	2,961	38.91%	131	1.72%
1964	3,734	47.93%	4,056	52.07%	0	0.00%
1968	3,757	41.80%	1,932	21.50%	3,298	36.70%
1972	5,784	69.28%	2,290	27.43%	275	3.29%
1976	4,031	41.47%	5,581	57.41%	109	1.12%
1980	5,681	50.98%	5,277	47.36%	185	1.66%
1984	6,017	56.43%	4,568	42.84%	77	0.72%
1988	5,635	57.32%	4,151	42.23%	44	0.45%
1992	4,842	41.04%	5,741	48.66%	1,216	10.31%
1996	4,206	42.70%	4,912	49.87%	731	7.42%
2000	5,465	50.48%	5,239	48.39%	123	1.14%
2004	6,605	56.18%	5,070	43.12%	82	0.70%
2008	7,455	64.01%	3,980	34.17%	211	1.81%
2012	7,225	66.58%	3,475	32.02%	151	1.39%
2016	7,756	74.69%	2,327	22.41%	301	2.90%
2020	9,205	77.32%	2,559	21.50%	141	1.18%
2024	9,547	80.35%	2,233	18.79%	102	0.86%

== See also ==
- National Register of Historic Places listings in Carroll County, Tennessee
