= WMUF =

WMUF may refer to:

- WHNY-FM, a radio station (104.7 FM) licensed to serve Henry, Tennessee, United States, which held the call sign WMUF-FM from 1998 to 2010 and WMUF from 2011 to 2019
- WHNY (AM), a radio station (1000 AM) licensed to serve Paris, Tennessee, which held the call sign WMUF from 1980 to 2011
- WLZK, a radio station (94.1 FM) licensed to serve Paris, Tennessee, which held the call sign WMUF-FM from 1991 to 1997
