= Woodland Mills, Tennessee =

- City
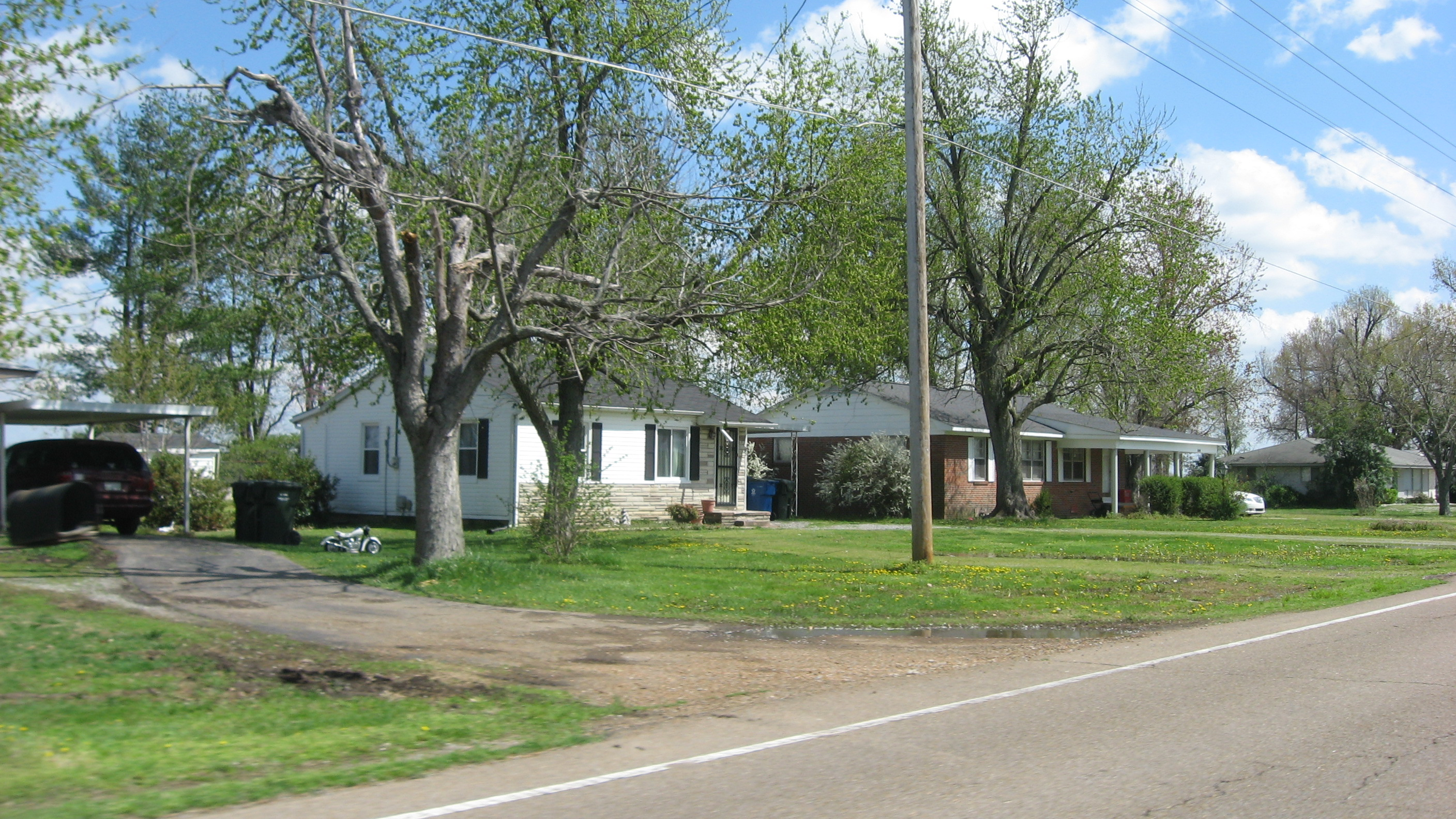
- Houses on State Route 5

- Location of Woodland Mills in Obion County, Tennessee.
- Coordinates: 36°28′31″N 89°6′45″W
- Country: United States
- State: Tennessee
- County: Obion
- Established: 1850s
- Incorporated: 1968

Government
  - Mayor: Joe Lewis

Area
  - Total: 1.27 sq mi (3.29 km^{2})
  - Land: 1.27 sq mi (3.29 km^{2})
  - Water: 0 sq mi (0.00 km^{2})
- Elevation: 364 ft (111 m)

Population (2020)
  - Total: 346
  - Density: 272.0/sq mi (105.01/km^{2})
- Time zone: UTC-6 (Central (CST))
  - Summer (DST): UTC-5 (CDT)
- ZIP code: 38271
- Area code: 731
- FIPS code: 47-81700
- GNIS feature ID: 1314534
- Website: https://www.woodlandmillstn.net/

Woodland Mills is a city in Obion County, Tennessee, United States. As of the 2020 census, Woodland Mills had a population of 346. It is part of the Union City, TN–KY Micropolitan Statistical Area.

== Geography ==
Woodland Mills is located at 36°28′31″N 89°6′45″W (36.475326, -89.112452).

According to the United States Census Bureau, the city has a total area of 1.1 square miles (2.8 km^{2}), all land.

== Demographics ==
Historical population
Census	Pop.	Note	%±
1970	396		—
1980	526		32.8%
1990	398		−24.3%
2000	296		−25.6%
2010	378		27.7%
2020	346		−8.5%

=== 2020 census ===
As of the 2020 census, Woodland Mills had a population of 346. The median age was 47.6 years. 18.2% of residents were under the age of 18 and 25.1% of residents were 65 years of age or older. For every 100 females there were 89.1 males, and for every 100 females age 18 and over there were 91.2 males age 18 and over.

0.0% of residents lived in urban areas, while 100.0% lived in rural areas.

There were 153 households in Woodland Mills, of which 30.7% had children under the age of 18 living in them. Of all households, 56.2% were married-couple households, 17.0% were households with a male householder and no spouse or partner present, and 23.5% were households with a female householder and no spouse or partner present. About 22.2% of all households were made up of individuals and 11.8% had someone living alone who was 65 years of age or older.

There were 165 housing units, of which 7.3% were vacant. The homeowner vacancy rate was 0.0% and the rental vacancy rate was 0.0%.

Racial composition as of the 2020 census
Race	Number	Percent
White	318	91.9%
Black or African American	20	5.8%
American Indian and Alaska Native	0	0.0%
Asian	0	0.0%
Native Hawaiian and Other Pacific Islander	0	0.0%
Some other race	0	0.0%
Two or more races	8	2.3%
Hispanic or Latino (of any race)	2	0.6%

=== 2000 census ===
As of the census of 2000, there was a population of 296, with 118 households and 92 families residing in the city. The population density was 280.2 inhabitants per square mile (108.2/km^{2}). There were 122 housing units at an average density of 115.5 per square mile (44.6/km^{2}). The racial makeup of the city was 91.22% White, 7.77% African American, 0.34% Asian, and 0.68% from two or more races. Hispanic or Latino of any race were 1.01% of the population.

There were 118 households, out of which 33.1% had children under the age of 18 living with them, 66.1% were married couples living together, 8.5% had a female householder with no husband present, and 21.2% were non-families. 20.3% of all households were made up of individuals, and 10.2% had someone living alone who was 65 years of age or older. The average household size was 2.51 and the average family size was 2.86.

In the city, the population was spread out, with 22.3% under the age of 18, 9.1% from 18 to 24, 29.7% from 25 to 44, 26.4% from 45 to 64, and 12.5% who were 65 years of age or older. The median age was 38 years. For every 100 females, there were 81.6 males. For every 100 females age 18 and over, there were 87.0 males.

The median income for a household in the city was $46,875, and the median income for a family was $51,250. Males had a median income of $37,125 versus $22,500 for females. The per capita income for the city was $19,103. About 5.2% of families and 4.5% of the population were below the poverty line, including none of those under the age of eighteen and 5.8% of those 65 or over.

== Media ==
Radio Stations

- WENK-AM 1240 - "The Greatest Hits of All Time"
- WWGY 99.3 - "Today's Best Music with Ace & TJ in the Morning"

== Education ==
It is in the Obion County Schools.
