= McKenzie, Tennessee =

McKenzie, Tennessee McKenzie Station
- City
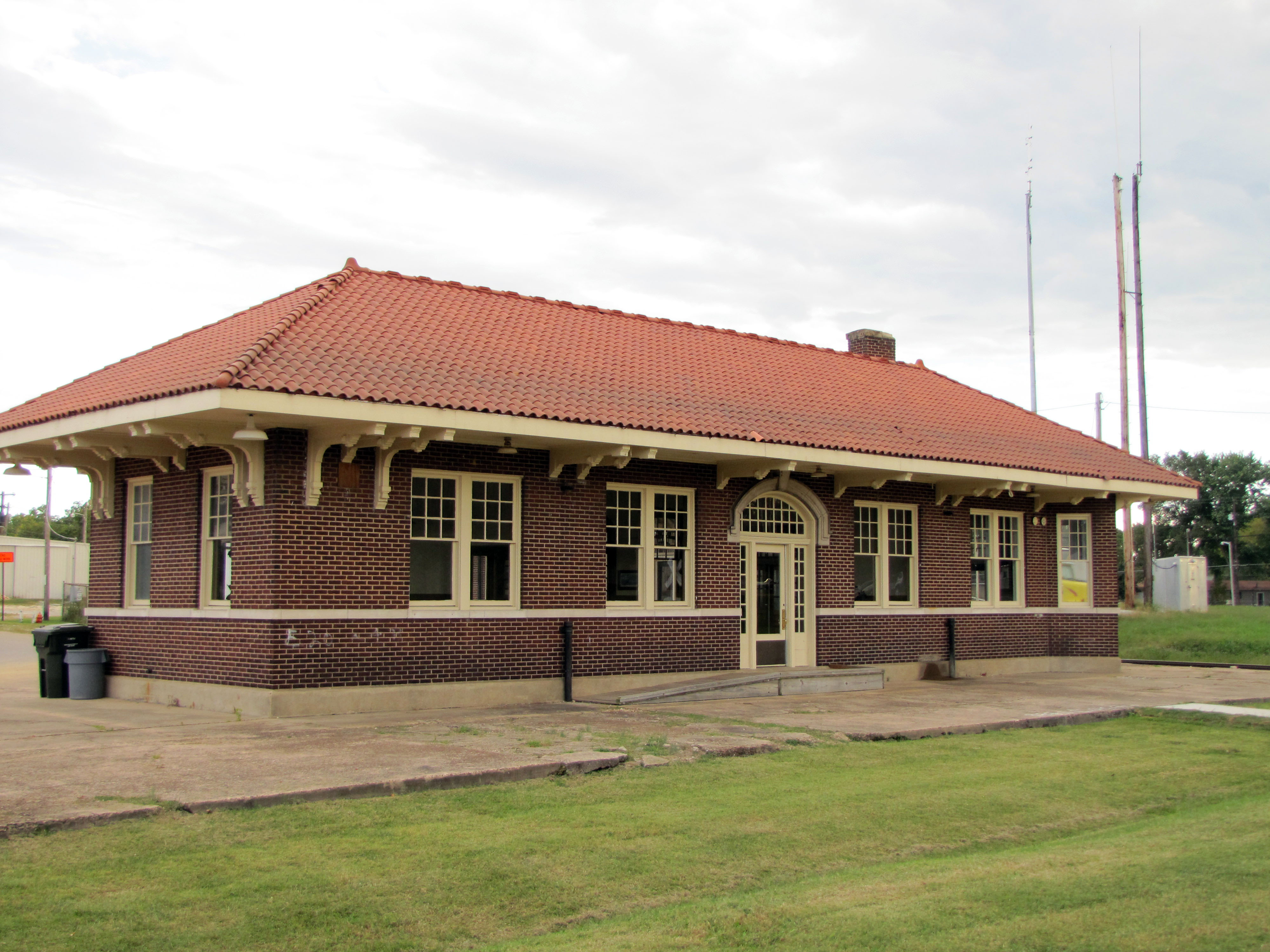
- The McKenzie Depot, September 2014
- Motto: This is your town...
- Location of McKenzie in Weakley County, Tennessee.
- Coordinates: 36°7′59″N 88°31′2″W
- Country: United States
- State: Tennessee
- Counties: Carroll, Weakley, Henry
- Incorporated: 1869
- Named after: James Monroe McKenzie (1818-1873)

Government
  - Mayor: Ryan Griffin
  - Vice Mayor: Jessie Townes

Area
  - Total: 6.37 sq mi (16.50 km^{2})
  - Land: 6.37 sq mi (16.49 km^{2})
  - Water: 0 sq mi (0.00 km^{2})
- Elevation: 492 ft (150 m)

Population (2020)
  - Total: 5,529
  - Density: 868.3/sq mi (335.24/km^{2})
- Time zone: UTC-6 (Central (CST))
  - Summer (DST): UTC-5 (CDT)
- ZIP code: 38201
- Area code: 731
- FIPS code: 47-44940
- GNIS feature ID: 1326832
- Website: mckenzietn.org

McKenzie is a city at the tripoint of Carroll, Henry, and Weakley counties in Tennessee, United States. As of the 2020 census, McKenzie had a population of 5,529.

== History ==
The city of McKenzie was originally surveyed and platted in 1865 on land that belonged to James McKenzie. This land was at the crossroads of the main lines for the Nashville & Northwestern Railroad and the Louisville & Memphis Railroad, and a station, originally called "McKenzie Station" was erected at the crossing. The town was incorporated by the state of Tennessee on January 22, 1869.

On October 15, 1887, the President of the United States, Grover Cleveland, visited the town and stayed overnight at the McKenzie Hotel, next door to the depot.

== Geography ==
McKenzie is located in northern Carroll County at 36°7′59″N 88°31′2″W (36.133189, -88.517189). A small part of the city extends north into Henry County, and a smaller part extends west into Weakley County. U.S. Route 79 passes through the city southeast of the center, leading northeast 17 miles (27 km) to Paris and southwest 20 miles (32 km) to Milan. Tennessee State Route 22 runs through the east side of the city as a bypass, leading northwest 25 miles (40 km) to Martin and southeast 10 miles (16 km) to Huntingdon.

According to the United States Census Bureau, McKenzie has a total area of 6.3 square miles (16.2 km^{2}), all land.

== Demographics ==
Historical population
Census	Pop.	Note	%±
1890	1,166		—
1900	1,266		8.6%
1910	1,322		4.4%
1920	1,630		23.3%
1930	1,858		14.0%
1940	2,019		8.7%
1950	3,774		86.9%
1960	3,780		0.2%
1970	4,873		28.9%
1980	5,405		10.9%
1990	5,168		−4.4%
2000	5,295		2.5%
2010	5,310		0.3%
2020	5,529		4.1%

=== 2020 census ===
As of the 2020 census, there were 5,529 people and 1,278 families residing in the city. The median age was 32.0 years, 19.7% of residents were under the age of 18, and 17.6% of residents were 65 years of age or older. For every 100 females there were 91.9 males, and for every 100 females age 18 and over there were 88.3 males age 18 and over.

93.8% of residents lived in urban areas, while 6.2% lived in rural areas.

There were 1,978 households in McKenzie, of which 29.6% had children under the age of 18 living in them. Of all households, 37.2% were married-couple households, 21.7% were households with a male householder and no spouse or partner present, and 34.3% were households with a female householder and no spouse or partner present. About 35.4% of all households were made up of individuals and 15.7% had someone living alone who was 65 years of age or older.

There were 2,351 housing units, of which 15.9% were vacant. The homeowner vacancy rate was 3.6% and the rental vacancy rate was 10.9%.

Racial composition as of the 2020 census
Race	Number	Percent
White	4,334	78.4%
Black or African American	707	12.8%
American Indian and Alaska Native	14	0.3%
Asian	30	0.5%
Native Hawaiian and Other Pacific Islander	3	0.1%
Some other race	153	2.8%
Two or more races	288	5.2%
Hispanic or Latino (of any race)	286	5.2%

=== 2000 census ===
As of the census of 2000, there was a population of 5,295, with 2,131 households and 1,412 families residing in the city. The population density was 957.9 inhabitants per square mile (369.8/km^{2}). There were 2,382 housing units at an average density of 430.9 units per square mile (166.4 units/km^{2}). The racial makeup of the city was 82.80% White, 14.24% African American, 0.11% Native American, 0.34% Asian, 0.02% Pacific Islander, 0.79% from other races, and 1.70% from two or more races. Hispanic or Latino of any race were 2.15% of the population.

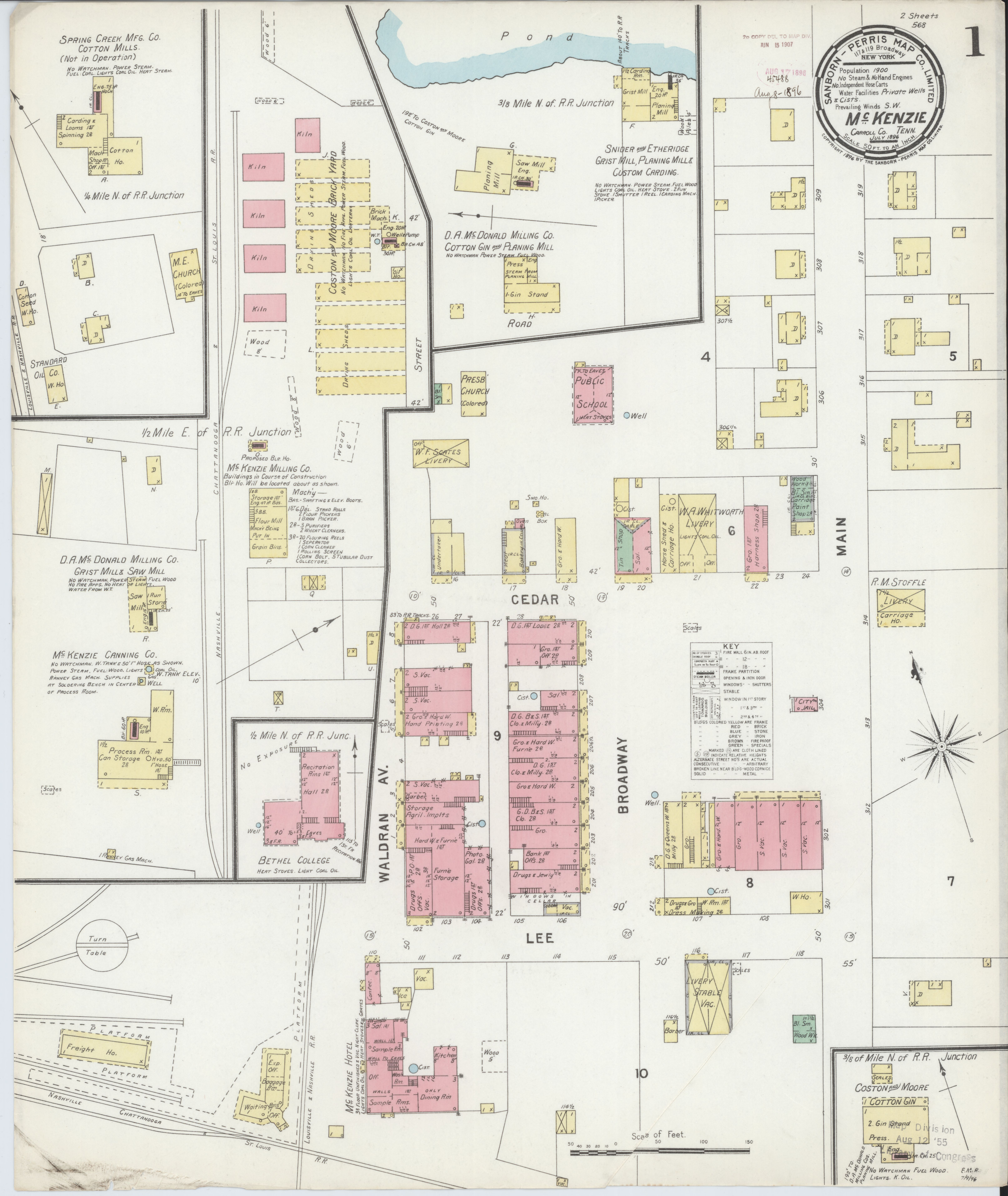
1896 Sanborn Fire Insurance Map from McKenzie, Carroll County, Tennessee

There were 2,131 households, out of which 28.4% had children under the age of 18 living with them, 47.4% were married couples living together, 15.6% had a female householder with no husband present, and 33.7% were non-families. 29.8% of all households were made up of individuals, and 14.6% had someone living alone who was 65 years of age or older. The average household size was 2.31 and the average family size was 2.85.

In the city, the population was spread out, with 21.8% under the age of 18, 12.4% from 18 to 24, 24.2% from 25 to 44, 22.8% from 45 to 64, and 18.8% who were 65 years of age or older. The median age was 38 years. For every 100 females, there were 88.7 males. For every 100 females age 18 and over, there were 85.7 males.

The median income for a household in the city was $28,319, and the median income for a family was $34,322. Males had a median income of $26,038 versus $19,090 for females. The per capita income for the city was $18,723. About 10.4% of families and 13.4% of the population were below the poverty line, including 19.1% of those under age 18 and 9.9% of those age 65 or over.

== Education ==
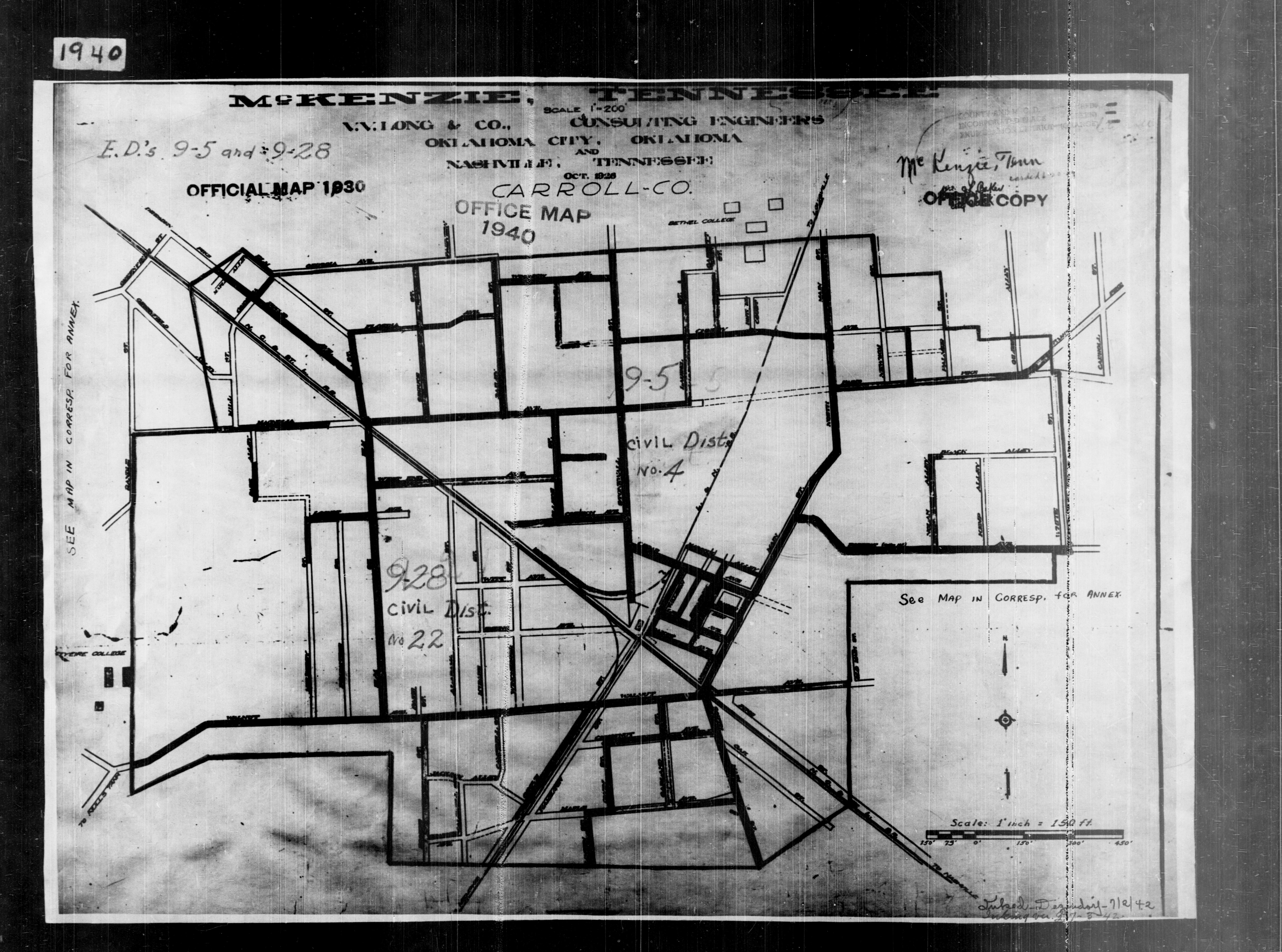
1940 Census Enumeration District Map for McKenzie, TN

=== Bethel University ===
Since 1872, Bethel University's campus has been located on the north side of town. This Cumberland Presbyterian affiliated university offers Bachelors and master's degrees in multiple fields. The school is accredited by the Southern Association of Colleges and Schools, and operates.satellite campuses in Jackson, TN, and Paris, TN.

=== Tennessee College of Applied Technology ===
Formerly the formerly named the McKenzie State Area Vocational School, the Tennessee College of Applied Technology is one of 46 institutions in the Tennessee Board of Regents system and offers courses in Industrial Electricity/Electronics, Machine Shop, Refrigeration, Office Occupations Instructor, Welding, Masonry, Industrial Maintenance, and HVAC.

=== McKenzie Special School District ===
- McKenzie Elementary School (grades PreK-4)
- McKenzie Middle School (grades 5–8)
- McKenzie High School (grades 9–12)

== Cultural Institutions ==
- Park Theater - A 1940s theater that shows local plays and movies
- McKenzie Memorial Library - City library with 14,902 books in circulation
- Gordon Browning Museum and Genealogical Library - Museum named in honor of former Tennessee Governor Gordon Browning
- Webb School Alumni Museum - local museum focused on the all-Black Webb School, which served West Tennessee from 1927 to 1966

== Media ==
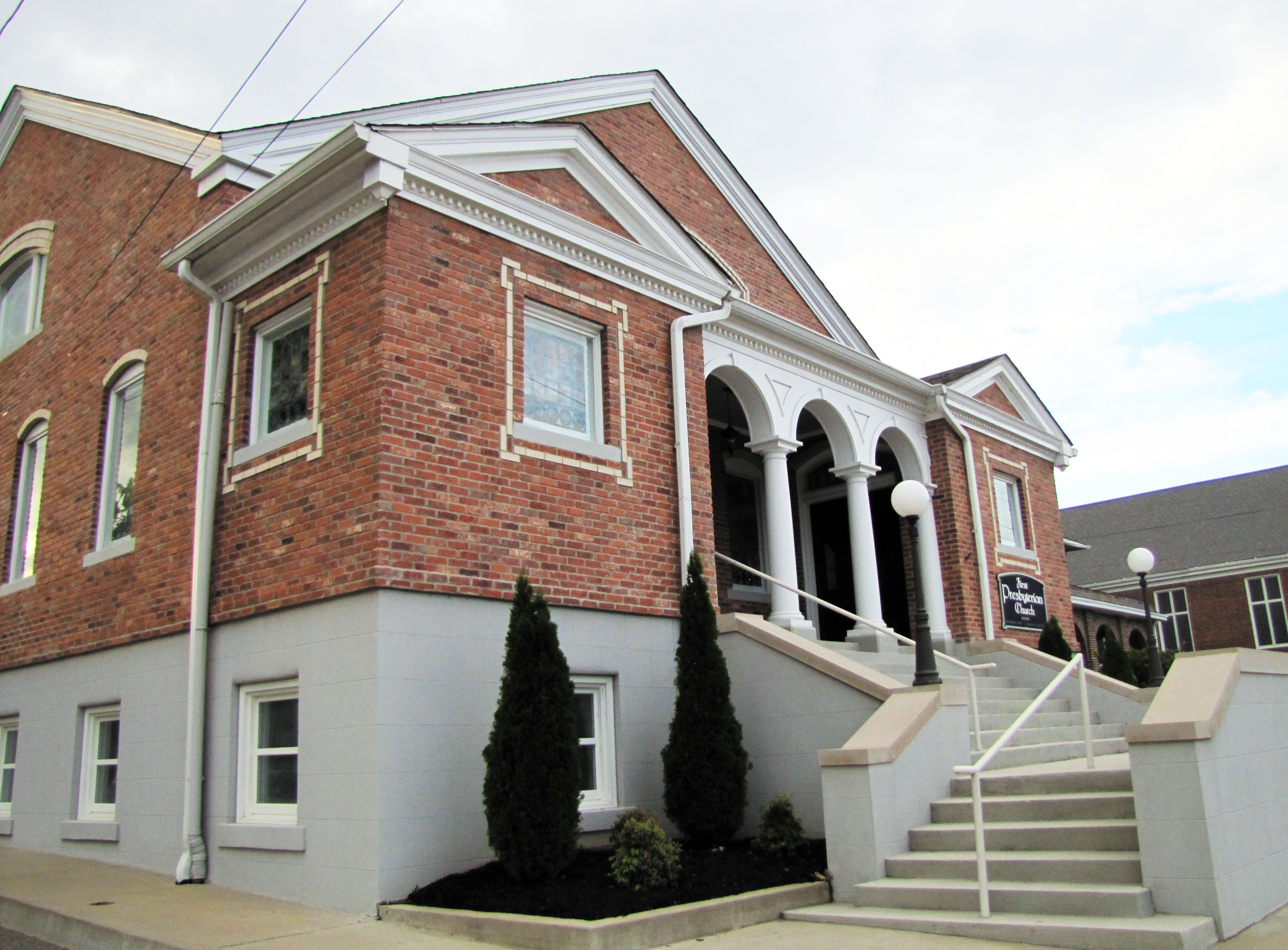
The First Presbyterian Church in McKenzie, September 2014

=== Radio ===
- WRQR-FM 105.5 "Today's Best Music with Ace & TJ in the Morning"
- WTPR-AM 710 "The Greatest Hits of All Time"
- WTPR-FM 101.7 "The Greatest Hits of All Time"
- WTJF AM 1390 FM 105.3 & 94.3 "The Mike Slater Show" 6 am-9 am
- WHDM 1440-AM 98.9-FM
- WAJJ 89.3 FM WAJJ Christian Radio

=== Newspapers ===
- The McKenzie Banner

=== Online News Publications ===
- Carroll County Observer

== See also ==
- List of cities in Tennessee
