= WHNY =

WHNY may refer to:

- WHNY (AM), a radio station (1000 AM) licensed to serve Paris, Tennessee, United States
- WHNY-FM, a radio station (104.7 FM) licensed to serve Henry, Tennessee
