= WRQR =

WRQR may refer to:

- WRQR-FM, a radio station (105.5 FM) licensed to serve Paris, Tennessee, United States
- WHNY (AM), a radio station (1000 AM) licensed to serve Paris, Tennessee, which held the call sign WRQR from 2011 to 2020
- WTIB, a radio station (94.3 FM) in Farmville, North Carolina, United States, known as WRQR until 1996
- WYHW, a radio station (104.5 FM) in Wilmington, North Carolina, known as WRQR from 1996 to 2008
- WBKZ, a radio station (105.1 FM) in Havelock, North Carolina, briefly known as WRQR in 2008
