= WPBE =

WPBE may refer to:

- WPBE-LP, a radio station (98.3 FM) licensed to West Palm Beach, Florida
- WEIO, a radio station (100.9 FM) licensed to Huntingdon, Tennessee, which held the call sign WPBE from 1982 to 1986
- WPBS (AM), a radio station (1040 AM) licensed to Conyers, Georgia, which held the call sign WPBE from 1989 to 2003
