= WWGY =

WWGY may refer to:

- WWGY (FM), a radio station (99.3 FM) licensed to serve Fulton, Kentucky, United States
- WYLE (FM), a radio station (95.1 FM) licensed to serve Grove City, Pennsylvania, United States, which held the call sign WWGY from 2004 to 2017
