= WWDX =

- Huntingdon, Tennessee; United States
- Frequency: 1530 kHz
- Branding: 100.9 The Farm

Programming
- Format: Country
- Affiliations: SportsMap

Ownership
- Owner: Chris Freeland and Laurie Hendrickson; (Freeland Broadcasting Co, Inc.)
- Sister stations: WEIO

History
- First air date: 1977
- Last air date: March 2025
- Former call signs: WJPJ (1975–1995); WDAP (1995–2007)

Technical information
- Licensing authority: FCC
- Facility ID: 54829
- Class: D
- Power: 1,000 watts day; 250 watts critical hours
- Transmitter coordinates: 36°0′4.2″N 88°26′2.2″W

Links
- Public license information: Public file; LMS

WWDX (1530 AM, "100.9 The Farm") was a daytime-only radio station broadcasting a country music format. Licensed to Huntingdon, Tennessee, United States, the station was owned by Chris Freeland and Laurie Hendrickson's Freeland Broadcasting Company, who inherited WWDX and WEIO from their father Jim.

The station was first licensed on June 15, 1977, as WJPJ; it became WDAP on October 23, 1995, and WWDX on August 27, 2007. WWDX went off the air in March 2025 due to antenna damage, ahead of the July closure of sister station WEIO. The Federal Communications Commission cancelled the station's license on April 8, 2026.
