= KPAC =

KPAC may refer to:

- Kerala People's Arts Club, a theatrical arts club in Kerala, India; actors associated with and named after it include
  - K. P. A. C. Azeez (1934–2003)
  - K. P. A. C. Lalitha (1947–2022)
  - K. P. A. C. Leela (fl. 1962 – c. present)
  - K. P. A. C. Sulochana (1938–2005)
  - K. P. A. C. Sunny (1934–2006)
- Kochavva Paulo Ayyappa Coelho, a 2016 Indian Malayalam-language film
- Krider Performing Arts Center, an auditorium in Paris, Tennessee, United States
- KPAC (FM), a radio station (88.3 FM) licensed to San Antonio, Texas, United States
- K-PAC (University of the Pacific), a radio station on the campus of the University of the Pacific in Stockton, California, United States
- KBTV-TV, a television station (channel 4) licensed to Port Arthur, Texas, United States, which formerly used the call sign KPAC
