= WHDM =

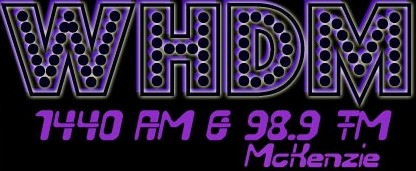
- McKenzie, Tennessee; United States
- Broadcast area: Huntingdon, Tennessee; Paris, Tennessee
- Frequency: 1440 kHz
- Branding: WHDM 1440 AM & 98.9 FM

Programming
- Format: Oldies
- Affiliations: Citadel Media

Ownership
- Owner: Forever Communications; (Forever South Licenses, LLC)
- Sister stations: WENK, WHNY, WHNY-FM, WLZK, WRQR-FM, WTPR, WTPR-FM, WWGY

History
- First air date: January 29, 1954

Technical information
- Licensing authority: FCC
- Facility ID: 61591
- Class: D
- Power: 500 watts day 91 watts night
- Transmitter coordinates: 36°7′58.00″N 88°31′24.00″W
- Repeater: 98.9 W255BF (McKenzie)

Links
- Public license information: Public file; LMS
- Website: www.radionwtn.com/whdm/

WHDM (1440 AM, "Oldies Radio") is a radio station broadcasting an oldies music format. Licensed to McKenzie, Tennessee, United States, the station is currently owned by Forever Communications, through licensee Forever South Licenses, LLC, and features programming from Citadel Media.
