= WVHR =

WVHR may refer to:

- WEIO, a radio station (100.9 FM) licensed to Huntingdon, Tennessee, which held the call sign WVHR from 1991 to 2009
- WWDE-FM, a radio station (101.3 FM) licensed to Hampton, Virginia, which has previously held the call sign WVHR
