= Lynching of Joseph Upchurch =

1927 lynching of a Black man in Tennessee

- Location: 36°18′4″N 88°18′50″W; Near Paris, Tennessee, USA
- Date: June 17, 1927
- Target: Joseph Upchurch
- Attack type: Lynching or shooting
- Victim: 1

Joseph Upchurch was an African-American man who was lynched by a mob near Paris, Tennessee, on June 17, 1927.

== Events ==
According to the Memphis Evening Appeal, Paris sheriff D. T. Caldwell was at Joseph Upchurch's house (in the northwest part of Henry County, Tennessee) on June 17, 1927, after being told by his relatives that he had been acting "queerly". The paper said "Upchurch is said to have been mentally unbalanced and threatened other negroes of the neighborhood", and when Caldwell attempted to arrest him, Upchurch shot him. Caldwell died soon thereafter, and a deputy locked Upchurch in a cabin. At the time the report was printed, Upchurch was still in the cabin; the deputy hadn't tried to move him to town because of the threat of mob violence, but a group of deputies was supposedly on the way to retrieve him.

The New York Times reported the next day on the events, and said that a mob of some 50 men had arrived at the cabin in which Upchurch was locked, and shot him. The cabin "was riddled with bullets by the posse".

A local magazine wrote up a slightly different story in 2013, and claimed that there was an exchange of gunfire involving lawmen and, apparently, the victim, but mentions no mob. After the sheriff was killed, it said, "Backup was called, and as other lawmen arrived, a chaotic scene ensued with hundreds of rounds of gunfire back and forth. In the end, Upchurch also was shot dead."
