= Lavinia, Tennessee =

- Unincorporated community
- Location within Tennessee Location within the United States
- Coordinates: 35°50′57″N 88°39′39″W
- Country: United States
- State: Tennessee
- County: Carroll

Area
  - Total: 1.41 sq mi (3.64 km^{2})
  - Land: 1.41 sq mi (3.64 km^{2})
  - Water: 0 sq mi (0.00 km^{2})
- Elevation: 531 ft (162 m)

Population (2020)
  - Total: 81
  - Density: 57.6/sq mi (22.24/km^{2})
- Time zone: UTC-6 (Central (CST))
  - Summer (DST): UTC-5 (CDT)
- ZIP code: 38348
- Area code: 731
- GNIS feature ID: 1290773

Lavinia is an unincorporated community in Carroll County, Tennessee, United States. In 1822, Lavinia was organized as a community. In 1950, Lavinia School was destroyed by a fire.

== Demographics ==
Historical population
Census	Pop.	Note	%±
2020	81		—
U.S. Decennial Census
