= WSOF (FM) =

- Madisonville, Kentucky; United States
- Frequency: 89.9 MHz (HD Radio)
- Branding: Light & Truth Radio Network

Programming
- Format: Christian radio

Ownership
- Owner: Island Ford Baptist Church; (Madisonville Baptist Temple Inc.)

History
- First air date: February 1977; 49 years ago
- Former call signs: WSOF-FM (1980–2017)
- Call sign meaning: "Wonderful Sounds of Faith"

Technical information
- Licensing authority: FCC
- Facility ID: 39596
- Class: C2
- ERP: 39,000 watts
- HAAT: 86 meters (282 ft)
- Transmitter coordinates: 37°21′26.00″N 87°28′41.00″W
- Repeater: see below

Links
- Public license information: Public file; LMS
- Webcast: Listen live
- Website: wsof.org

WSOF (89.9 FM) is a Christian radio–formatted radio station licensed to Madisonville, Kentucky, United States. The station is currently owned by Madisonville Baptist Temple Inc. WSOF serves as the flagship station of the Light & Truth Radio Network, which consists of an additional 4 full-power FM stations across Western Kentucky, West Tennessee, and Southern Illinois. The station's transmitter is located at the church on Island Ford Road (KY 281) on the northeast side of Madisonville.

== History ==
WSOF went on-the-air in February 1977 as a ministry of Island Ford Baptist Church. At its start, the station aired programming 18 hours a day. In 2005, IFBC purchased WAJJ in McKenzie, Tennessee. In November 2021, WSOF applied for three construction permits for new non-commercial stations. All of them would be granted, with the three stations launching by 2023.

== Satellite stations ==
In addition to its primary signal from Madisonville, WSOF is relayed on four full-power stations and one translator across Western Kentucky, West Tennessee, and Southern Illinois:

Location	Callsign	Frequency	Sign on date	Class	ERP (watts)	HAAT	Facility ID	Transmitter coordinates	Notes
McKenzie, Tennessee	WAJJ	89.3 FM	January 14, 2002; 24 years ago	A	620	125 m (410.10 ft)	93702	36°6′55.4″N 88°30′37″W	
Murray, Kentucky	WKYG	89.3 FM	2022; 4 years ago	A	500	123 m (403.54 ft)	765784	36°38′43.9″N 88°28′32.2″W	
Cadiz, Kentucky	WLHE	88.7 FM	2023; 3 years ago	A	2,500	87 m (285.43 ft)	765780	36°48′32″N 87°56′12″W	
Harrisburg, Illinois	WLTM	90.3 FM	2022; 4 years ago	A	260	192 m (629.92 ft)	765792	37°35′06″N 88°30′47″W	
Paris, Tennessee	W242AS	96.3 FM	2006; 20 years ago	D	13	97.4 m (319.55 ft)	145181	36°19′37.2″N 88°15′58.2″W	Translator of WAJJ
