= Huntingdon, Tennessee =

- Town
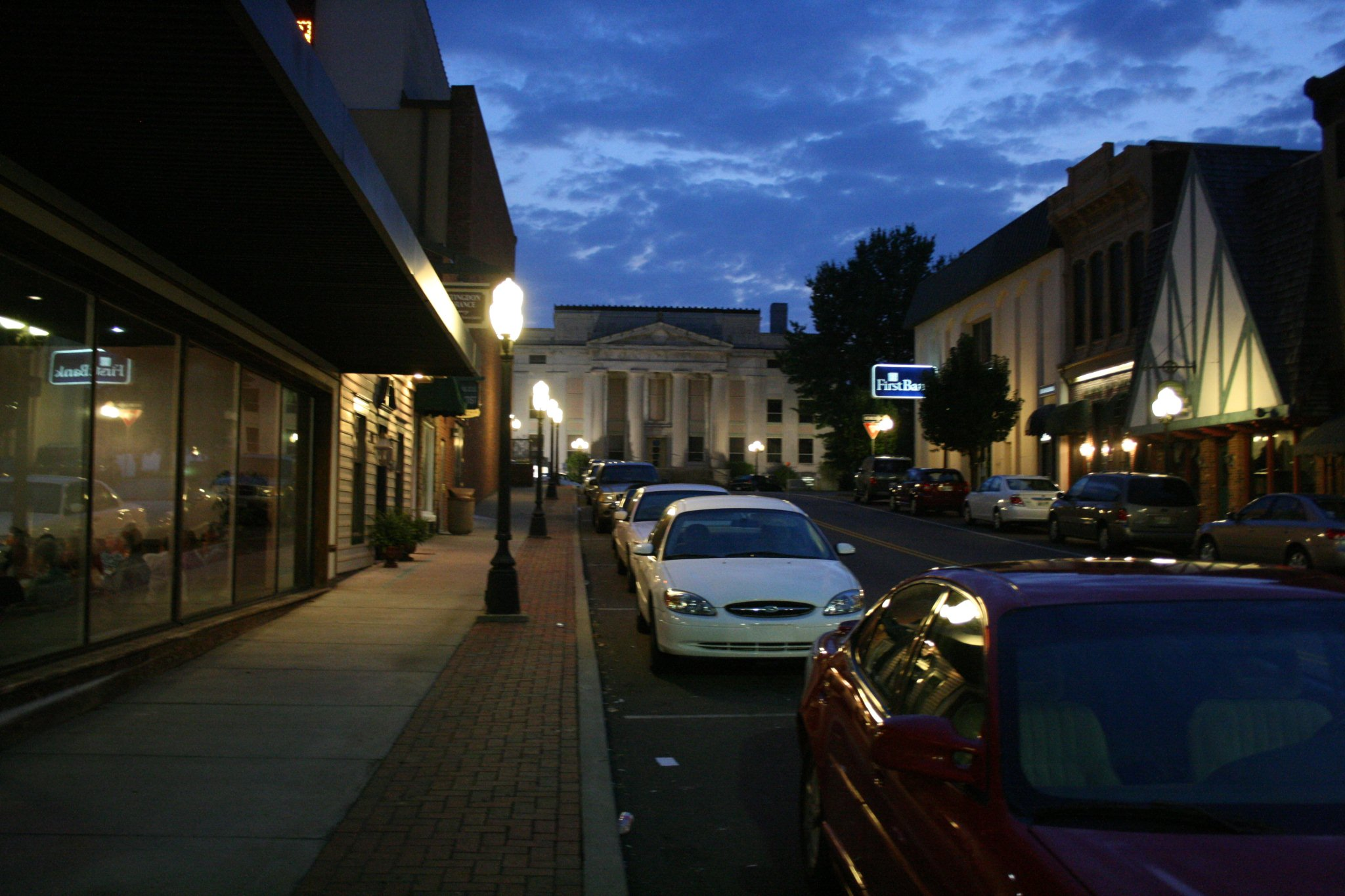
- Huntingdon Court Square as seen from Main Street
- Motto: "Honoring Our Heritage
- Location of Huntingdon in Carroll County, Tennessee.

- Location of Huntingdon, Tennessee
- Coordinates: 36°0′26″N 88°25′14″W
- Country: United States
- State: Tennessee
- County: Carroll

Area
  - Total: 11.89 sq mi (30.79 km^{2})
  - Land: 11.84 sq mi (30.66 km^{2})
  - Water: 0.050 sq mi (0.13 km^{2})
- Elevation: 410 ft (120 m)

Population (2020)
  - Total: 4,439
  - Density: 375.0/sq mi (144.77/km^{2})
- Time zone: UTC-6 (Central (CST))
  - Summer (DST): UTC-5 (CDT)
- ZIP code: 38344
- Area code: 731
- FIPS code: 47-36580
- GNIS feature ID: 1288761
- Website: www.huntingdontn.com

Huntingdon is a town in Carroll County, Tennessee, United States. The population was 4,439 at the 2020 census and 3,985 in 2010. It is the county seat of Carroll County.

== History ==
European-American settlers named Huntingdon for Memucan Hunt, who first owned the town site in western Tennessee. Huntingdon was home to many prominent farming families.

== Geography ==
Huntingdon is located slightly east of the center of Carroll County at 36°0′26″N 88°25′14″W (36.007154, -88.420683).

According to the United States Census Bureau, the town has a total area of 12.0 square miles (31.0 km^{2}), of which 11.9 square miles (30.8 km^{2}) is land and 0.04 square miles (0.1 km^{2}), or 0.42%, is water.

=== Climate ===
Climate data for Huntingdon Water Plant, Tennessee (1991–2020 normals, extremes 1962–present)
Month	Jan	Feb	Mar	Apr	May	Jun	Jul	Aug	Sep	Oct	Nov	Dec	Year
Record high °F (°C)	77 (25)	83 (28)	88 (31)	92 (33)	94 (34)	106 (41)	104 (40)	105 (41)	101 (38)	96 (36)	86 (30)	85 (29)	106 (41)
Mean daily maximum °F (°C)	47.0 (8.3)	51.8 (11.0)	61.1 (16.2)	71.3 (21.8)	79.1 (26.2)	86.3 (30.2)	89.2 (31.8)	88.8 (31.6)	83.1 (28.4)	72.2 (22.3)	59.8 (15.4)	50.1 (10.1)	70.0 (21.1)
Daily mean °F (°C)	37.6 (3.1)	41.2 (5.1)	49.7 (9.8)	59.2 (15.1)	68.2 (20.1)	76.0 (24.4)	79.3 (26.3)	78.1 (25.6)	71.2 (21.8)	59.8 (15.4)	48.5 (9.2)	40.6 (4.8)	59.1 (15.1)
Mean daily minimum °F (°C)	28.2 (−2.1)	30.6 (−0.8)	38.4 (3.6)	47.1 (8.4)	57.3 (14.1)	65.8 (18.8)	69.3 (20.7)	67.4 (19.7)	59.4 (15.2)	47.3 (8.5)	37.2 (2.9)	31.0 (−0.6)	48.2 (9.0)
Record low °F (°C)	−23 (−31)	−2 (−19)	5 (−15)	22 (−6)	32 (0)	41 (5)	44 (7)	47 (8)	32 (0)	24 (−4)	10 (−12)	−11 (−24)	−23 (−31)
Average precipitation inches (mm)	4.18 (106)	4.58 (116)	5.45 (138)	5.25 (133)	5.91 (150)	4.66 (118)	4.74 (120)	3.60 (91)	3.49 (89)	3.99 (101)	4.72 (120)	5.35 (136)	55.92 (1,420)
Average snowfall inches (cm)	1.6 (4.1)	1.0 (2.5)	0.2 (0.51)	0.0 (0.0)	0.0 (0.0)	0.0 (0.0)	0.0 (0.0)	0.0 (0.0)	0.0 (0.0)	0.0 (0.0)	0.1 (0.25)	0.4 (1.0)	3.3 (8.4)
Average precipitation days (≥ 0.01 in)	9.9	9.1	11.4	9.9	10.5	9.3	8.5	7.1	6.4	7.7	8.9	10.0	108.7
Average snowy days (≥ 0.1 in)	1.0	0.7	0.2	0.0	0.0	0.0	0.0	0.0	0.0	0.0	0.0	0.2	2.1
Source: NOAA

== Demographics ==
Historical population
Census	Pop.	Note	%±
1850	245		—
1870	609		—
1880	646		6.1%
1890	707		9.4%
1900	1,332		88.4%
1910	1,112		−16.5%
1920	1,121		0.8%
1930	1,286		14.7%
1940	1,432		11.4%
1950	2,043		42.7%
1960	2,119		3.7%
1970	3,661		72.8%
1980	3,962		8.2%
1990	4,180		5.5%
2000	4,349		4.0%
2010	3,985		−8.4%
2020	4,439		11.4%

=== 2020 census ===
Huntingdon racial composition
Race	Num.	Perc.
White (non-Hispanic)	3,394	76.46%
Black or African American (non-Hispanic)	673	15.16%
Native American	12	0.27%
Asian	27	0.61%
Other/Mixed	241	5.43%
Hispanic or Latino	92	2.07%

As of the 2020 census, Huntingdon had a population of 4,439. The median age was 41.4 years. 23.7% of residents were under the age of 18 and 22.0% of residents were 65 years of age or older. For every 100 females there were 87.8 males, and for every 100 females age 18 and over there were 82.3 males age 18 and over.

0.0% of residents lived in urban areas, while 100.0% lived in rural areas.

There were 1,833 households in Huntingdon, of which 29.9% had children under the age of 18 living in them. Of all households, 42.3% were married-couple households, 16.0% were households with a male householder and no spouse or partner present, and 35.8% were households with a female householder and no spouse or partner present. About 32.6% of all households were made up of individuals and 16.1% had someone living alone who was 65 years of age or older.

There were 2,008 housing units, of which 8.7% were vacant. The homeowner vacancy rate was 2.2% and the rental vacancy rate was 9.0%.

=== 2010 census ===
As of the census of July 2010, there were 3,985 people living in the town.

=== 2000 census ===
As of the census of 2000, the population density was 387.8 inhabitants per square mile (149.7/km^{2}). There were 1,950 housing units at an average density of 173.9 units per square mile (67.1 units/km^{2}). The racial makeup of the town was 80.52% White, 17.87% African American, 0.14% Native American, 0.11% Asian, 0.02% Pacific Islander, 0.11% from other races, and 1.22% from two or more races. Hispanic or Latino of any race were 0.62% of the population.

There were 1,752 households, out of which 30.1% had children under the age of 18 living with them, 51.4% were married couples living together, 14.4% had a female householder with no husband present, and 32.1% were non-families. 29.5% of all households were made up of individuals, and 16.0% had someone living alone who was 65 years of age or older. The average household size was 2.34 and the average family size was 2.88.

In the town, the population was spread out, with 23.3% under the age of 18, 7.2% from 18 to 24, 25.3% from 25 to 44, 23.2% from 45 to 64, and 21.0% who were 65 years of age or older. The median age was 41 years. For every 100 females, there were 84.1 males. For every 100 females age 18 and over, there were 79.4 males.

The median income for a household in the town was $27,625, and the median income for a family was $41,438. Males had a median income of $31,506 versus $20,081 for females. The per capita income for the town was $17,296. About 9.3% of families and 14.3% of the population were below the poverty line, including 19.2% of those under age 18 and 14.5% of those age 65 or over.

== Media ==
Radio stations:

- WRQR-FM 105.5 "Today's Best Music with Ace & TJ in the Morning"
- WTPR-AM 710 "The Greatest Hits of All Time"
- WEIO 100.9 The Farm Home of the Country hits of Today and Yesterday

Newspapers:

- Carroll County News-Leader
- The McKenzie Banner
- Tennessee Magnet Publications

Online News Publications:

- Carroll County Observer

== Recreation, sports, and entertainment ==
The town is the site of the Dixie Carter Performing Arts and Academic Enrichment Center, which serves as a premiere venue for the performing, literary, visual and media arts. It is named for Carroll County native Dixie Carter.

The New Carroll County Thousand Acre Recreation Lake is located on Hwy 70 West out of Huntingdon.

== Notable people ==
- Jessica Andrews, country music singer
- Gordon Browning, governor of Tennessee from 1937 to 1939
- Dixie Carter, film, television, and stage actress, best known for her role as Julia Sugarbaker in the CBS sitcom Designing Women (Born in Neighboring McLemoresville)
- Carl Mann, rockabilly singer
- George W. Murphy, governor of Arkansas
- Tim Priest, former Tennessee football player and Vol Network color commentator
- Timothy Tucker, former president of the American Pharmacists Association
