= Westport, Tennessee =

- Unincorporated community
- Location within Tennessee Location within the United States
- Coordinates: 35°53′47″N 88°19′02″W
- Country: United States
- State: Tennessee
- County: Carroll
- Elevation: 469 ft (143 m)
- Time zone: UTC-6 (Central (CST))
  - Summer (DST): UTC-5 (CDT)
- ZIP code: 38387
- Area code: 731
- GNIS feature ID: 1304495

Westport is an unincorporated community in Carroll County, Tennessee, United States. Its Zip Code is 38387.
