= Yuma, Tennessee =

- Unincorporated community
- Location within Tennessee Location within the United States
- Coordinates: 35°50′51″N 88°20′12″W
- Country: United States
- State: Tennessee
- County: Carroll

Area
  - Total: 1.45 sq mi (3.75 km^{2})
  - Land: 1.45 sq mi (3.75 km^{2})
  - Water: 0 sq mi (0.00 km^{2})
- Elevation: 482 ft (147 m)

Population (2020)
  - Total: 103
  - Density: 71.1/sq mi (27.46/km^{2})
- Time zone: UTC-6 (Central (CST))
  - Summer (DST): UTC-5 (CDT)
- ZIP code: 38390
- Area code: 731
- GNIS feature ID: 1304717

Yuma is an unincorporated community in Carroll County, Tennessee, United States. It is located along Tennessee State Route 424 about 3.5 miles (5.6 km) southeast of Clarksburg. Yuma has a post office, with Zip code 38390.

Yuma derives from the Cherokee word meaning "good" and "peaceful", the name was chosen by officials who were impressed by the fertility of the land.

== Demographics ==
Historical population
Census	Pop.	Note	%±
2020	103		—
U.S. Decennial Census
