= Leach, Tennessee =

Unincorporated community in Tennessee, US

Coordinates: 35°55′58″N 88°29′14″W

Leach is an unincorporated community in Carroll County, in the U.S. state of Tennessee.

== History ==
A post office called Leach was established in 1880, and remained in operation until 1986. The community was named for the local Leach family.
