= Krider Performing Arts Center =

Coordinates: 36.2924°N 88.3042°W

Krider Performing Arts Center (KPAC) is an auditorium located in Paris, Henry County, Tennessee, United States. It is attached to Paris Elementary School, which frequently utilizes the facility. KPAC features a full stage with curtains, a backstage props room, a green room, a piano room, a sound booth, a catwalk, and a lobby with a ticket counter. The auditorium has a seating capacity of approximately 500 to 600 people.

== Uses ==
The Krider Center is available throughout the year for musical, dance, and theatrical performances, as well as conferences, seminars and church meetings.

— Krider Performing Arts Center Website,

Aside from the frequent use by the elementary school, the city also uses KPAC. Professionals and other traveling groups have graced the auditorium, usually drawing more crowds than locally sponsored programs, though both types' audience turn-outs don't always depend on the performer(s). Paris city schools (grades pre-school through eighth) have free in-school music programs that use KPAC for general music, strings, and band concerts.

It also hosts various both profit and non-profit groups throughout the year. Because the auditorium has the sound booth and stage, musical and promotional groups also book appearances. Recently, community churches have taken short residency on Sundays. Since the accommodations and services at KPAC are relatively convenient for the area, the auditorium is popular among the region. The Krider Center is used yearly for theatrical purposes, too.

== KPAC programs ==
=== Krider Idol ===
KPAC holds auditions for a program called Krider Idol, a semi-mock of the popular TV show American Idol. Only the most talented youngsters are chosen to perform. On the night of the competition the contestants are eliminated by the judges until there is only one left.

=== Drama programs ===
They also have a summer theater workshop called Children's Theater and a winter one called Winter Workshop, founded winter 2007. For a small fee, the enrolled students spend several weeks during the summer and/or winter in which instructors both direct and teach the students in three plays based for three different age groups: 5-8; 9-12; 13–18 years old. Anyone in the area can audition for the play in their age group; if the students above a certain age want to participate in the play, but don't want a role, they can sign up to join the stage crew. These people work behind the scenes learning skills from an experienced instructor such as building the sets used in the actual play, how to manage the props, and learning to operate the stage's mechanical components. The entire cast attend practices and learn about the art of drama. These plays rely heavily on their sets, and the actors wear costumes when on stage performing.

== History ==
KPAC's name is taken from a Paris, Tennessee, couple, Clem and Ruby Krider. For more than 60 years, they played a major role in the art community of Henry County. Ruby taught public speaking and drama to many generations of Parisians, a few being Tony winner Cherry Jones, Pulitzer Prize winner John Noble Wilford, Cheers star Shelley Long, Vanderbilt law professor Robert Covington, and Ford Motor Company Controller Frank Mason.

In the summer of 2003, KPAC was minorly hit by a tornado passing through the Henry County area. The lobby windows and such were damaged. It wasn't damaged nearly as badly, though, as one of the nearby wings of the Paris Elementary School; the third-grade hallway of the building had to be rebuilt. While the school wing took several months to repair, KPAC was soon and again opened to the public.
