= The Ace & TJ Show =

Syndicated morning radio show

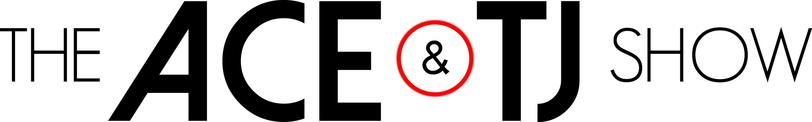
- Official Logo
- Genre: comedy, talk
- Running time: 6:00 a.m.-10:00 a.m. Eastern (weekdays)
- Country of origin: United States
- Home station: WNKS Charlotte, NC
- Starring: Ace; TJ; Riggins; Alexis
- Original release: November 29, 1993 – September 20, 2024
- Website: AceTJ.com
- Podcast: AceTJ.com/listen

The Ace & TJ Show was a syndicated morning radio show originating out of Charlotte, North Carolina. It was mainly featured in the Southern United States, and mainly targeted Southerners. By January 5, 2012, The Ace & TJ Show began broadcasting as the morning show on WHQC ("Channel 96-1"). Ace & TJ were previously on Charlotte's WNKS ("Kiss 95.1"), where the show debuted on April 6, 1998. After some unsuccessful contract discussions with CBS Radio, their last day on Kiss 95.1 was Friday, May 20, 2011. Their non-compete agreement was valid until December 1, 2011, at which point they started to look for a new home station in Charlotte.

Ace & TJ were eight-time nominees for the Radio and Records CHR "Personality Of The Year", though they never won.

The show was available among the cities in which they are broadcast through terrestrial radio. The show is also available online through the Ace & TJ Button. Additional programming is also available on The Ace & TJ Button immediately following the end of the terrestrial radio version of the show online from AceTJ.com. There is also an Ace & TJ Button App available in the iTunes App Store and Android Marketplace.

As of August 31, 2021, Ace & TJ was no longer heard in Charlotte except for minute-long clips airing throughout the day on WXRC. This follows the end of the duo's relationship with iHeartRadio. Now that they own the show, the morning show will continue via online streaming and various apps in addition to 13 affiliates, eight of which will carry the full show.

Channel 96-1's former logo 2011-2014

On July 13, 2022, it was reported that the program would return to the web site of its former flagship station (WNKS) on July 18, while Ace & TJ Anytime would air on the station from 9 A.M. to Noon.

In May 2024 it was announced the show would move to WKQC.

On September 20, 2024, it was announced that Ace is no longer with the show. The TJ & Riggins show was to start September 23. New co-host Bryan "Riggins" Weber started as an intern in 2009 and became vice-president of programming for the network in 2016. WKQC dropped the show.

On February 4, 2025, it was announced that Ace passed at age 56.

== Show line-up ==
=== Main cast ===
- TJ: The Love Specialist. He was the other co-host of the show. TJ has two children: Lanie and Aiden aka "Boy", as TJ calls him, and he is married to Jodi. His real name is Ritchie. TJ also hosts the TJ & Jodi's House Podcast with his wife, Jodie.
- Riggins: The Music Master. Was an intern from January to August 2009. He was The Ace & TJ Show's creative consultant. He constantly updates the website, making sure that it always has the most current videos and information.
- Tech-D Rob: The Technical Director. Rob took BreezeKat's position following Breeze's exit from the show. He is now in charge of the technical aspects of the show. Rob also hosts the Nerd News Podcast.
- Lindsay: The Girl. Right before joining the Ace & TJ Show, she was a dancer for the Charlotte Bobcats dance team. Lindsey returned to the show September 2024.

=== Former show members ===
- Ace: The Rockstar (left show September 2024). The lead singer of the band Charity Case. He "ran the board" for the show and was the co-host along with TJ. Had three children, Payton (deceased July 2020), Cade, and Dax. He was married to Amanda. His real name was David. Ace also hosted the Meaningful Meeting Podcast.
- Alexis (2020-2024): The New Girl. The newest member of the show. She started behind the scenes as an assistant for Adam, the show manager. In January 2021 she became a full-time cast member.
- Sass (2018-2020) Sass is a former intern for the show. She got her name honestly, being sassy. She's a very talented singer and had gone on to pursue other ventures.
- Guenn (2016-2018) "Ol' Girl" came back after abandoning the show for the competition back in 2011. The cast missed Guenn and loved having her back for a few years. Guenn decided to take time away from radio to spend with family but still does radio spots for iHeart.
- Caroline (2013): The Executive Producer. Caroline replaced Yankee Pete as the show's Executive Producer following Pete's retirement from radio. Caroline joined the show from Houston, where she was the producer of The Roula & Ryan Show. Caroline officially joined the show shortly after news broke on July 16, 2013.
- Yankee Pete (1998-2013): The Guy With The Really Deep Voice. He was officially Ace & TJ's Chief of Staff. He is also the voice behind Stupid News. Yankee Pete, who had been in the radio industry for over 24 years and with the Ace & TJ Show for a total of 19 years, retired from the Ace & TJ Show on June 28, 2013.
- Monica (2011-2012): The Little Big Star. Monica Palumbo was the last guest Ace & TJ ever had in their original studio in Charlotte. She filled-in during Ace & TJ's seven-month absence from Charlotte radio while their former "girl" waited out her noncompete clause. Monica was hired by the show a few months after Guenn took a job with Ace & TJ's former company CBS Radio. Her first official day as being a regular cast member was Tuesday, January 3, 2012. Before joining the show she was a model with Marilyn Green, whose modeling agency was in charge of Sprint's models for their NASCAR contract. She also is a former Miss North Carolina USA. On November 1, 2012, Monica made the announcement that she would be leaving The Ace & TJ Show at the end of the year to move to Fuquay-Varina, near Raleigh, NC to be with her new husband, Rick, where his car dealership is located. They were married on May 5, 2012 and decided to live in the same house rather than continue commuting back and forth. Monica's last day on the show was Thursday, December 20, the day before the show's annual break for Christmas and New Year's. She also serves as a Fox Sports correspondent.
- BreezeKat (2001-2012): The Bouncy Little Ninja. Started as an intern in 2001 and worked off and on with the Show for the next 11 years until reaching the title of Executive Producer. He was in charge of Total Ace & TJ. Additionally, he was in charge of the interns. BreezeKat left the Ace & TJ Show on August 10, 2012 to take a Chief of Staff position with Bob and the Showgram. Following BreezeKat's departure with the Showgram, he became the Executive Producer of the now defunct Drex and Maney show on Kiss 95.1.
- Guenn (2007–2011): Ol' Girl. Guenn replaced Madden. She was in the sales and promotions department at the show's former flagship station, Kiss 95.1, until she sat in for a couple of days, and, after a short time filling in, Ace and TJ thought that they should make her the permanent replacement for Madden. After Ace & TJ's contract with CBS Radio expired, Guenn had to remain with CBS, as her contract ran through December 2011. Originally, they planned to have her rejoin The Ace & TJ Show after the expiration of her contract with CBS Radio. Ace & TJ made the announcement on their show in September 2011 that Guenn would not be returning to the show. Returned to the show as "the girl" in January 2017.
- White Shadow (2008–2010): The Guy Who Was On The Roof That One Time. Shadow was in charge of doing most of the posting to the website. On Monday, October 11, 2010, less than a week after he became engaged to his girlfriend, Amy, Shadow said farewell to the Ace & TJ radio family.
- Ryan (2001–2008): The Stunt Guy. He was with the show 7 years, filling the show's producer role. He ran the group of interns in the news room and made sure things with the website are up-to-date.
- Madden (2005–2007): The Redneck Girl. She replaced Angie in June 2005. Left the Show June 27, 2007 to become a mid-day host and assistant program director in Modesto, CA.
- Cubby (2004–2006): The Britney Spears Lover. Intern turned assistant producer that was with the show for 2 years. Cubby has been a special in-studio and call-in guest of the show from time to time.
- Angie Fitzsimmons (2000–2005): The Angel. Angie left the show in June 2005 to move to Los Angeles with her husband. Has since become the executive producer on Carson Daly's radio show.
- Terri (1996–2000): The Original Girl. Terri was "the girl" originally.
- Intern / Daddy Matt (1998–2000): Started out as the intern and then stayed on to become an assistant producer.
- Justin (1997–1998): Was an assistant producer before Intern Matt joined the show. Is featured on Ace & TJ's first CD, No, You Shut Up!

== List of Ace & TJ affiliates ==
Radio stations that broadcast the show include

- WWGY (Froggy 99.3) / WRQR-FM (Rocky 105.5) from Fulton, Kentucky / Union City/Martin/Paris, Tennessee
- WKIB Mix 96.5 from Cape Girardeau, Missouri
- WERO BOB 93.3 from Greenville, North Carolina / Jacksonville, North Carolina
- WMYI 102.5 The Lake from Greenville/Spartanburg, South Carolina
- WNOK 104.7 WNOK from Columbia, South Carolina
- WKSI 98-3 Kiss FM from Winchester, Virginia
- WMKS Hits 100.3 from Greensboro, North Carolina
- WJSR Awesome 100.9 from Lakeside, Virginia
- WLZK The Lake 94.1 from Paris, Tennessee

All of the above stations air or have previously aired a Top 40 (CHR) format, except for KABW, which plays country music.

== Philanthropy ==
- Payton's Promise: A charity founded to focus on disaster relief, community improvements, supplementing other charities, and to fill needs for families when caring for terminally ill or chronically disabled children. Later renamed "Payton's Promise" after Ace's daughter was killed in a motor vehicle collision in July, 2020.
- Ace and TJ founded their own charity called "Ace & TJ's Grin Kids". Ace & TJ's Grin Kids is a non-profit 501(c)3 charity, created by morning show personalities Ace & TJ in Charlotte, North Carolina in January 2000. The name of the organization comes from Ace & TJ's motto on their morning show, "You Grin, You're In!". The charity is run solely on the donations from the show's listeners, The Radio Family. The goal is to take a plane-load of permanently disabled and terminally ill children to Disney World each year in October. The charity went on its first trip to Disney World in 2000 and just recently made its 13th consecutive trip. The trip each year is cost-free to the participants and has brought joy to over 260 children. The charity ceased operations in 2022.
- Charity Case is a band that Ace formed in 2001 to mimic the show Making the Band plays solely to raise money for Grin Kids. The band was formed to originally play for one show, has since gone on to raise more than $750 thousand for the charity. Charity Case finished its eight-year run in June 2009. The retirement ended in March 2010 and they even tried to open for the band KISS during their summer 2010 tour. In attempting to do so, they had to submit an original song, Victoria's Secret, the first ever released by Charity Case.
- World Vision: Ace & TJ began a relationship with World Vision, a Christian-based charity that allows people to sponsor children in third-world countries all over the world to bring such basic relief as clean water to communities stricken by overwhelming poverty. Ace & TJ spent all day helping to raise money and sponsorship of "last chance" children during their show on Thursday, July 26, 2012, with everyone on the show taking part and sponsoring children themselves.
- Breaking & Entering Christmas: Ace & TJ take nominations for families in need in November each year for a series they call "Breaking & Entering Christmas". Yankee Pete and his band of Merry Hoodlum Elves then travel to the houses of the families, break into their house, and leave thousands of dollars in Christmas gifts, decorations, and other necessities to help these families through the holidays and the winter. Gifts for the families are donated from businesses all over the Ace & TJ listening area as well as donations from Ace & TJ Radio Family members (listeners).
- In April 2007, Ace & TJ began work on a project to build two memorial parks. One would be named Jeff Shelton Memorial Park, which would be a revitalization of the Old City of Locust Park, which opened October 20, 2007. The other would be named Sean Clark Memorial Park, which would be located inside of Beatties Ford Park, in East Lincoln County, NC. They are to be named after slain Charlotte Mecklenburg Police Officers Jeff Shelton and Sean Clark, who were murdered in the line of duty on March 31, 2007. Sean Clark Memorial Park was completed in 2013.
- Another popular event sponsored by the show is the Second Chance Prom, which is open to ages 21 and over. The Second Chance Prom is held annually on the first Saturday of May in Uptown Charlotte, with all the proceeds going to Grin Kids.
- Over the years, Ace & TJ have held many donation marathons for different tragedies, disasters and charities. Some of them include one for September 11, Hurricane Katrina (which was called Give to the Gulf).

== Show features ==
=== Current ===
- Now Trending: Takes place at the top of every hour. It was the hourly news segment. It replaced the Ace & TJ Update and Stupid News.
- The Week in Review: A weekly segment that took place on Fridays at the start of the second hour of the show and is replayed at the start of the third hour. This segment is a song composed by Riggins that recaps all the important things that have gone on during the week, both show-related and pop culture news.
- The Guinness Book of Listeners: An ongoing list of unofficial records held by members of the Ace & TJ Radio Family. An updated list could usually be found within a few days of a new entry on the Features page of http://www.AceTJ.com. Each entry was based on the honor of the person calling or e-mailing and include such entries as "Most Illegitimate Kids in a Wedding", "Married to the Person with the Most Divorces", "Oldest Prom Date", "Shortest Time from Meeting to Playing the Piano", and "Dated a Man the Longest Before Finding Out He Was Married", to name a few. The "winners" in these various categories not only claim bragging rights throughout the entire and quickly-growing Ace & TJ Radio Empire, but also were immortalized in the annals of Ace & TJ Show History.
- The World Famous Friday Morning Weekend Blastoff: A segment immediately following the Ace & TJ Update every Friday. They played five songs, including a sing along clip, to get everyone listening pumped up and ready for the weekend. One of the longest-running and most popular bits in the history of the show, songs were usually from the hair metal, old school hip hop, and boy band genres.
- The Ace & TJ Curse: If something is going to break or get messed up, it will mess up for Ace and/or TJ at the most inopportune time.

=== Past ===
- Stupid News: A former daily segment hosted by Yankee Pete that details all the stupid things that people do in the news. It is one of Ace & TJ's longest-running segments. One of Ace & TJ's longest-running segments and was unceremoniously replaced by The Fix.
- Herman: Ace's 'real' name. TJ started saying that Ace's real name was Herman (it's actually David) and actually fooled a lot of people into thinking that was Ace's real name. One such instance was when a listener was yelling "Hey Herman" at Ace repeatedly down the aisle of a store.
- TJ's Relationship Recovery Show: A previous Button Show hosted by TJ, who dispensed his expert relationship advice to the masses in attempt to aid the people in getting the romance they need. It aired Mondays, immediately following More Show.
- Let's Talk with Monica: A previous Button Show, it featured Monica talking about whatever she wanted and often featured friends of hers as special guests. It aired Fridays, immediately following The Hangover with Riggins.
- TJ's Wife: Jodi, according to TJ, she is "351 Pounds of Half-Nubian nasty". She also rides around on a "Fat Scooter". This is a false description.
- The Ace & TJ Show And Now We Know segment: At the end of every show, each main cast member – Ace, Riggins, Pete, Monica, and TJ – would share something that they learned from the Show that day, set to Riggins and his guitar.
- Show Apologies: At the end of every show, Yankee Pete would list, by name, and say the show is sorry to people that the Show or someone individually may have offended throughout the day.
- 5 Things You Need To Know: At the end of every show the Yankee Pete would run down a list of the 5 Things a listener would need to know for the rest of the day. Some of these were funny in nature, others were more serious. This show feature was unceremoniously retired on March 12, 2010.
- Elvis Presley and his colon: On everything related to Presley, TJ, and sometimes other members of the show, make sure to note that "At the time of Elvis's death, his colon was twice its normal size due to a build up of white fecal matter".
- The Circle of Life: One of the show's gags where, during every story that features something to do with Africa, this will be the introduction to the story. Each show member gets a great deal of joy from hearing this song and it has been stated that the Yankee Pete paid over $10 just to find the right version.
- Yankee Pete used to make jokes about hiring prostitutes and then later killing them to get his money back. Everyone laughs, but Ace is always uncomfortable with the jokes.
- iPod Idol: This is where BreezeKat will sing a song picked by Ace & TJ to sing and did so while wearing headphones plugged directly into the music. It usually ended with a lot of laughs from the cast.
- Super Ace: Running joke that started a few weeks before Ace's High School Reunion, where it was noted that Ace has the ability to save all reunions when they are in jeopardy.
- The Ace Curse: In opposition of Super Ace was the Ace Curse, where Ace always goes too far when interviewing celebrities and asks the wrong questions, which does a good job in embarrassing the show and making others feel bad for him. Some very funny incidents were when Ace asked Carolina Panthers' Wide Receiver Steve Smith about his love for the show I Love Lucy, to which Smith replied that he had no idea what Ace was talking about. Another even more comical incident was when TJ and Madden played a prank on Ace when, shortly after the death of Anna Nicole Smith's son, they interviewed singer James Blunt and, in Blunt's bio report put together by Madden, it stated that Blunt had done a song for the Anna Nicole Smith's show called Hats Off, to which Blunt replied, "are you sure you're interviewing the right person", as well as some other very funny comments on Ace's behalf.
- Dr. Phil: Most of the members of the show have expressed their love for the television personality and earlier in the life of the show TJ did an impression of Dr. Phil in answering questions about peoples' problems. One day TJ stopped "feeling it" and said that they went to the well one too many times on this one.
- Pet Psychic: Another one of TJ's personalities where he imitated the Pet Psychic that was featured on Animal Planet. He also interviewed a few dogs, including Angie's, a former show member's dog and making some very funny, suggestive comments. This was also declared by TJ as "going to the well one too many times" and has been dropped as one of their bits.
- Drunk Kiss Fan: Recorded by former show member BreezeKat, before a Kiss/Aerosmith concert and is constantly used throughout the show to add an extra bit of humor.
- Drunk Mötley Crüe Fan: Recorded by former show member Ryan at the Mötley Crüe/Aerosmith concert, the favorite saying from the clip is "I did, man, myself!".
- Britney Spears Comeback: Ace & TJ Morning Show extended an offer to Britney Spears to perform in front of top broadcast and recording-industry executives from around the country in 2007. The R&R Convention, which is recognized as the premier annual conference for the radio and record industries was co-located with the NAB Radio Show in Charlotte, NC. Ace & TJ offered Britney a secured spot in front of the very people who helped launch her career.
- Freddie Fatterson: Very large character portrayed by the Yankee Pete.
- A popular running joke was that everyone would make fun of Yankee Pete's affinity for lite/soft rock music, which never fit the bill of the CHR-formatted stations that carry the show. Some of the artists include Dan Fogelberg, Cyndi Lauper and Billy Joel, Yankee Pete also loves Neil Diamond and would sing his songs "coming to America" and others to name a few.
- Yankee Pete's German Voice: When any story or news item involves a German, Yankee Pete would do an impression of a German accent.
- Christie's Best Friend: Yankee Pete would speak as a teenage girl whenever making fun of girls. She loved Christie's uncle and hated her mom. Pete always did the voice as a typical teenage girl's voice, using phrases such as, "like" and "whatever".
- Make Pete Say Geez: was another popular game they played where radio family would call in and tell their most 'red-neck' story and which ever one had Pete groan the most and say "Geez" would be the winner.
- Ace & TJ Celebrity News (formerly Guenntertainment): A daily recap of all things celebrity related.
- Bad Boyfriend Poker: A segment that TJ thought up after seeing a book in the bargain bin at a Barnes & Noble Bookstore, two callers alternate playing three "hands" or "stories" each of bad boyfriends. The cast then votes on who they believe has the worst boyfriend, making her the winner, or "loser", depending on how you look at it. Not only has this segment been borrowed by radio shows throughout the country, but it has become The Ace & TJ Show's CSI of radio contests since its debut on September 1, 2009, spurring such spinoffs as Psycho Ex-Girlfriend Poker, Psycho Mother-in-Law Poker, Bad Date Poker, Dysfunctional Family Poker, Bad Dad Poker, and Bad Best Friend Poker, to name a few.
- Top This: A segment where listeners are charged with one-upping each other with their stories. It is the evolution of Make Pete Say Jeez. Listeners call in with their crazy stories, each getting more extreme than the last in the level of crazy.

== Original CDs ==
- No, You Shut Up!: released in 1999. This was Ace & TJ's first CD released to benefit Grin Kids. Composed totally of clips from the show and parody songs performed by Ace.
- 12 pack o' Nuthin': released in 2001. The second CD released by Ace & TJ. Featured clips from the show and acoustic performances from bands such as Train.
- That Ain't Funny: released in 2002. Third CD released. Only features clips from the show and parody songs done by Ace.
- Mirth, Wit, & Merry Song: released in 2003. Their last CD released containing clips from the show. Also has acoustic performances from bands such as Matchbox Twenty and Uncle Kracker.
- Charity Case: released in 2007. Their most current CD. Consists only of recordings of Ace's band, Charity Case. It was recorded live in 2006 during Gravedigger's Ball in Charlotte, North Carolina.

== Original books ==
- The Extraordinary Adventures of an Oh-So Ordinary Rabbit by Dexter R. Abbott: written for children and all proceeds going to Ace & TJ's Grin Kids. Illustrated by a Grin Kid as well.
