= WWGY (FM) =

Radio station in Fulton, Kentucky

- Fulton, Kentucky; United States
- Broadcast area: Western Kentucky; West Tennessee; Union City, Martin
- Frequency: 99.3 MHz
- Branding: Froggy 99.3

Programming
- Format: Country
- Affiliations: Ace & TJ Show; Westwood One

Ownership
- Owner: Forever Communications; (Forever South Licenses, LLC)
- Sister stations: WENK, WHDM, WHNY, WHNY-FM, WLZK, WRQR-FM, WTPR, WTPR-FM

History
- First air date: 1954; 72 years ago (as WFUL-FM)
- Former call signs: WFUL-FM (1953–1982); WWKF (1982–2019)

Technical information
- Licensing authority: FCC
- Facility ID: 71506
- Class: A
- ERP: 3,000 watts
- HAAT: 91 meters (299 ft)
- Transmitter coordinates: 36°27′59.2″N 88°56′47.2″W

Links
- Public license information: Public file; LMS
- Webcast: Listen live
- Website: www.radionwtn.com

WWGY (99.3 FM, "Froggy 99.3") is a country music formatted radio station licensed to Fulton, Kentucky, and serving Union City, and Martin, Tennessee. The station is owned and operated by Forever Communications, through licensee Forever South Licenses, LLC. The syndicated Ace & TJ Show is carried weekday mornings.

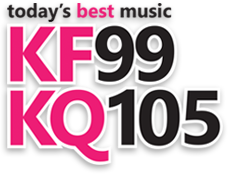
Logo as "KF 99"

On February 3, 2020, WWGY changed their format from top 40/CHR to country, branded as "Froggy 94.3 & 99.3".

On December 30, 2020, WWGY dropped their broadcast on WTJF-FM and rebranded on-air as "99.3 Northwest TN's Froggy", dropping the mention of 94.3.
