= WLZK =

Radio station in Jackson, Tennessee

- Paris, Tennessee; United States
- Broadcast area: Jackson, Tennessee
- Frequency: 94.1 MHz
- Branding: 94.1 The Lake

Programming
- Format: Hot adult contemporary
- Affiliations: Jones Radio Network

Ownership
- Owner: Forever Communications; (Forever South Licenses, LLC)
- Sister stations: WENK, WHDM, WHNY, WHNY-FM, WRQR-FM, WTPR, WTPR-FM, WWGY

History
- First air date: November 1, 1991 (as WMUF-FM)
- Former call signs: WMUF-FM (1991–1997)

Technical information
- Licensing authority: FCC
- Facility ID: 4806
- Class: C3
- ERP: 10,500 watts
- HAAT: 100 meters (330 ft)
- Transmitter coordinates: 36°18′50.00″N 88°17′33.00″W

Links
- Public license information: Public file; LMS
- Webcast: Listen live
- Website: www.radionwtn.com

WLZK (94.1 FM) is a radio station broadcasting a hot adult contemporary format. Licensed to Paris, Tennessee, United States, the station serves the Jackson, Tennessee area. The station is currently owned by Forever Communications, through licensee Forever South Licenses, LLC, and features programming from Jones Radio Network.

== History ==
The station went on the air as WMUF-FM on 1991-04-10. On 1997-06-09, the station changed its call sign to the current WLZK.
