= WHNY-FM =

- Henry, Tennessee; United States
- Broadcast area: Paris, Tennessee
- Frequency: 104.7 MHz
- Branding: Big Henry 104.7

Programming
- Format: Country
- Affiliations: Fox News Radio; Westwood One

Ownership
- Owner: Forever Communications; (Forever South Licenses, LLC)
- Sister stations: WENK, WHDM, WHNY, WLZK, WRQR-FM, WTPR, WTPR-FM, WWGY

History
- First air date: 1999 (as WMUF-FM)
- Former call signs: WMUF-FM (1998–2010); WRQR (2010–2011); WMUF (2011–2019); WHNY (2019)

Technical information
- Licensing authority: FCC
- Facility ID: 85416
- Class: A
- ERP: 2,900 watts
- HAAT: 145 meters (476 ft)
- Transmitter coordinates: 36°08′19″N 88°15′52″W

Links
- Public license information: Public file; LMS
- Webcast: Listen Live
- Website: WHNY-FM Online

WHNY-FM (104.7 MHz) is a radio station licensed to serve Henry, Tennessee, United States. The station, which broadcasts a country music format, is owned by Forever Communications, through licensee Forever South Licenses, LLC.

== History ==
The station was assigned the WMUF-FM call sign by the Federal Communications Commission on June 1, 1998. On September 20, 2010, the station changed its call sign to WRQR, and again on October 8, 2011, to WMUF. On July 1, 2019, the station changed its call sign to WHNY, and then to WHNY-FM on December 23, 2019.

On March 2, 2020, WHNY-FM rebranded as "Big Henry" and shifted its format from country music to classic country in a simulcast with sister station WHNY.
