= WHNY (AM) =

- Paris, Tennessee; United States
- Broadcast area: Jackson TN area
- Frequency: 1000 kHz
- Branding: Big Henry

Programming
- Format: Country (WHNY-FM simulcast)
- Affiliations: Fox News Radio; Westwood One

Ownership
- Owner: Forever Communications; (Forever South Licenses, LLC)
- Sister stations: WENK, WHDM, WHNY-FM, WLZK, WRQR-FM, WTPR, WTPR-FM, WWGY

History
- First air date: 1980 (as WMUF)
- Former call signs: WMUF (1980–2011); WRQR (2011–2020)

Technical information
- Licensing authority: FCC
- Facility ID: 4805
- Class: D
- Power: 5,000 watts day 2,500 watts critical hours
- Transmitter coordinates: 36°18′50.00″N 88°17′33.00″W
- Translator: 97.5 W248BK (Paris)

Links
- Public license information: Public file; LMS
- Webcast: Listen Live
- Website: www.radionwtn.com

WHNY (1000 kHz) is an American AM radio station broadcasting a country music format, simulcasting WHNY-FM 104.7 Henry, Tennessee. Licensed to Paris, Tennessee, United States, it serves the Jackson, Tennessee, area. The station is owned by Forever Communuications, through licensee Forever South Licenses, LLC, and features programming from Westwood One.

On March 2, 2020, WHNY changed their format from oldies to classic country, simulcasting WHNY-FM 104.7, branded as "Big Henry".

== FM translator ==
In addition to the main station at 1000 kHz, WHNY is relayed by an FM translator to widen its broadcast area and, in this case, allow 24 hours broadcasting of the format. WHNY is a daytime-only station. The FM translator also gives the listener the advantage of FM broadcasting in high fidelity stereo sound.

Broadcast translator for WHNY
Call sign	Frequency	City of license	FID	ERP (W)	HAAT	Class	FCC info
W248BK	97.5 FM	Paris, Tennessee	153039	250	100 m (328 ft)	D	LMS

== Previous logo ==
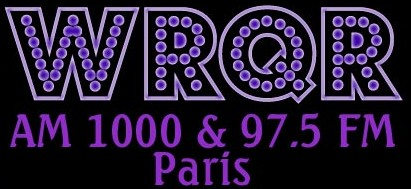
