= WRQR-FM =

Radio station in Paris, Tennessee

- Paris, Tennessee; United States
- Broadcast area: Western Kentucky; and West Tennessee; (Paris, McKenzie, Murray)
- Frequency: 105.5 MHz
- Branding: Rocky 105.5

Programming
- Format: Classic rock
- Affiliations: Ace & TJ Show; Westwood One

Ownership
- Owner: Forever Communications; (Forever South Licenses, LLC)
- Sister stations: WENK, WHDM, WHNY, WHNY-FM, WLZK, WTPR, WTPR-FM, WWGY

History
- First air date: 1967; 59 years ago
- Former call signs: WTPR-FM (1968–1985); WAKQ (1985–2019)

Technical information
- Licensing authority: FCC
- Facility ID: 71502
- Class: A
- ERP: 3,700 watts
- HAAT: 128 meters (420 ft)
- Transmitter coordinates: 36°16′45.2″N 88°20′31.1″W

Links
- Public license information: Public file; LMS
- Webcast: Listen live
- Website: www.radionwtn.com

WRQR-FM (105.5 MHz, "Rocky 105.5") is a radio station licensed to Paris, Tennessee and serves Paris, McKenzie, Tennessee, and Murray, Kentucky. It broadcasts a classic rock format. The station is owned and operated by Forever Communications, through licensee Forever South Licenses, LLC. The syndicated Ace & TJ Show is carried weekday mornings.

On February 3, 2020, WRQR-FM changed their format from top 40/CHR to classic rock, branded as "Rocky 105.5".

== Previous logo ==
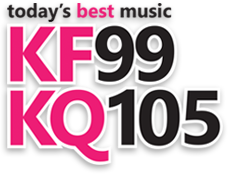
