= WEIO =

- Huntingdon, Tennessee; United States
- Frequency: 100.9 MHz
- Branding: 100.9 The Farm

Programming
- Format: Country

Ownership
- Owner: Chris Freeland and Laurie Hendrickson; (Freeland Broadcasting Co, Inc.)
- Sister stations: WWDX

History
- First air date: November 1979 (as WPVG)
- Last air date: July 1, 2025
- Former call signs: WPVG (1976–1982); WPBE (1982–1986); WHZZ-FM (1986–1991); WVHR (1991–2009)
- Call sign meaning: "EIEIO" from "Old MacDonald Had a Farm"

Technical information
- Licensing authority: FCC
- Facility ID: 42368
- Class: C3
- ERP: 25,000 watts
- HAAT: 91 meters (299 ft)
- Transmitter coordinates: 35°57′5.2″N 88°27′47.1″W

Links
- Public license information: Public file; LMS
- Website: www.thefarmradio.com

WEIO (100.9 FM, "100.9 The Farm") was a radio station that last broadcast a country music format. Licensed to Huntingdon, Tennessee, United States, the station was owned by Chris Freeland and Laurie Hendrickson's Freeland Broadcasting Company, who inherited the station from their father Jim.

On July 1, 2025, WEIO ceased operations; its AM sister station, WWDX, had left the air in March due to antenna damage. By the time of the station's closure, the studio and transmitter facility had become more valuable than WEIO itself; co-owner Chris Freeland attributed WEIO's decline to changes in management and the market. The studio building was immediately sold; the WEIO license was separately placed on the market, with the intention of returning it to the Federal Communications Commission if a buyer was not found. The license was surrendered in June 2026.
