= Paris, Tennessee =

- City
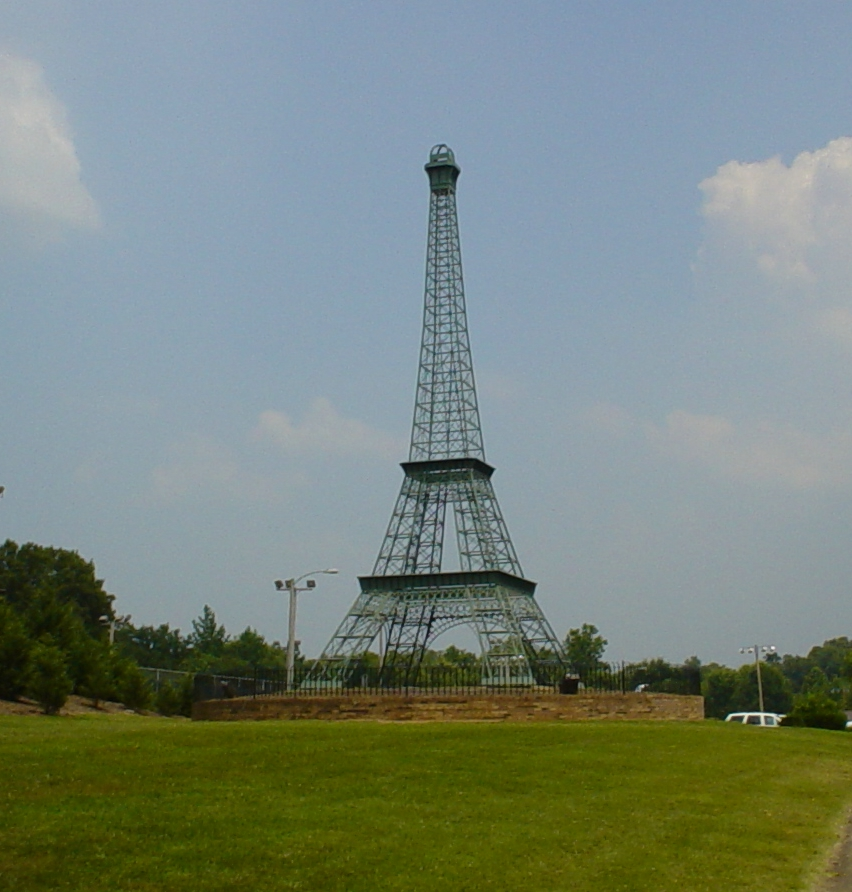
- The Eiffel Tower of Paris, Tennessee

- Flag Seal Logo

- Location in Henry County, Tennessee
- Coordinates: 36°18′4″N 88°18′50″W
- Country: United States
- State: Tennessee
- County: Henry
- Incorporated: 1823
- Named for: Paris, France

Area
  - Total: 12.95 sq mi (33.55 km^{2})
  - Land: 12.91 sq mi (33.43 km^{2})
  - Water: 0.046 sq mi (0.12 km^{2})
- Elevation: 515 ft (157 m)

Population (2020)
  - Total: 10,316
  - Density: 799.2/sq mi (308.56/km^{2})
- Time zone: UTC-6 (Central (CST))
  - Summer (DST): UTC-5 (CDT)
- ZIP code: 38242
- Area code: 731
- FIPS code: 47-56720
- GNIS feature ID: 1296772
- Website: City website

Paris is a city in and the county seat of Henry County, Tennessee, United States. As of the 2020 census, the city had a population of 10,316.

A 70-foot (21 m) replica of the Eiffel Tower stands in the southern part of Paris.

== History ==
The present site of Paris was selected by five commissioners appointed to the task of choosing a county seat at the December 1822 session of the Court of Pleas and Quarter Sessions of Henry County. Their choice was a 50-acre (20 ha) site, of which 37.5 acres (15.2 ha) were owned by Joseph Blythe and 12.5 acres (5.1 ha) owned by Peter Ruff; both men donated the land to the county to have the seat there. A public square, streets, alleys, and 104 lots were laid off, and the lots were sold at auction over a two-day period in either March or April 1823.

Paris was incorporated on September 30, 1823. It was the first town incorporated in West Tennessee, followed by Lexington on October 9, 1824, and Memphis on December 19, 1826. The city was named after Paris, in honor of the Marquis de Lafayette, a hero of the American Revolutionary War.

As the county seat, Paris was a center of trade for the rural county, which was largely devoted to agriculture and particularly the cultivation of cotton as a commodity crop. The planters depended on a large workforce of enslaved African Americans. In 1927, a man named Joseph Upchurch was lynched in Paris.

Between about 1970 and 1990, Paris became the center of the Old Beachy Amish. Beachy Amish from different regions moved there to maintain their traditional ways. Because of internal conflicts, most Old Beachy Amish left the region in the early 1990s and had completely vacated it by 2000.

Since the American Civil War, Paris has had an African American community of around 15%. Prior to the early 1960s, young black children attended segregated schools. But beginning in the 1960s, the town of Paris worked in conjunction with Henry County to consolidate all schools, busing all children from the periphery of the county to consolidated, integrated schools in Paris. The process was largely peaceful. Also beginning in the 1960s, there was a gradual process of integration of the races in business around the town, also largely peaceful.

== Geography ==
Paris is located just south of the center of Henry County at 36°18′4″N 88°18′50″W (36.301229, -88.313815). U.S. Route 641 passes through the city center as Market Street, leading north 21 miles (34 km) to Murray, Kentucky, and southeast 22 miles (35 km) to Camden. U.S. Route 79 passes southeast of the city center as Tyson Avenue and Wood Street; it leads northeast 62 miles (100 km) to Clarksville and southwest 16 miles (26 km) to McKenzie. Nashville, the state capital, is 86 miles (138 km) to the east in a straight line and 113 miles (182 km) by the quickest road route, via Clarksville.

According to the United States Census Bureau, Paris has a total area of 13.0 square miles (33.7 km^{2}), of which 13.0 square miles (33.6 km^{2}) are land and 0.04 square miles (0.1 km^{2}), or 0.27%, is covered by water. The city is drained primarily to the east, by tributaries of West Sandy Creek, flowing to the Tennessee River in Kentucky Lake. The southwest corner of the city drains to the Middle Fork of the Obion River, a west-flowing tributary of the Mississippi River.

=== Climate ===
The climate of Paris is humid subtropical (Köppen Cfa) with mild winters and hot summers. Under the Trewartha climate classification, it is a temperate oceanic (Do) climate because only 7 months of the Paris year have a mean daily temperature of 50 °F (10 °C) or higher.

Climate data for Paris, Tennessee (1991–2020 normals, extremes 1922–1927, 1937–2018)
Month	Jan	Feb	Mar	Apr	May	Jun	Jul	Aug	Sep	Oct	Nov	Dec	Year
Record high °F (°C)	80 (27)	82 (28)	89 (32)	92 (33)	96 (36)	105 (41)	108 (42)	111 (44)	106 (41)	98 (37)	85 (29)	80 (27)	111 (44)
Mean daily maximum °F (°C)	45.9 (7.7)	50.7 (10.4)	60.0 (15.6)	70.4 (21.3)	77.9 (25.5)	85.1 (29.5)	88.2 (31.2)	88.1 (31.2)	82.3 (27.9)	71.7 (22.1)	59.0 (15.0)	49.1 (9.5)	69.0 (20.6)
Daily mean °F (°C)	36.2 (2.3)	40.1 (4.5)	48.4 (9.1)	58.1 (14.5)	66.8 (19.3)	74.6 (23.7)	78.0 (25.6)	77.2 (25.1)	70.6 (21.4)	59.2 (15.1)	47.7 (8.7)	39.5 (4.2)	58.0 (14.4)
Mean daily minimum °F (°C)	26.6 (−3.0)	29.6 (−1.3)	36.9 (2.7)	45.7 (7.6)	55.6 (13.1)	64.1 (17.8)	67.7 (19.8)	66.3 (19.1)	58.9 (14.9)	46.7 (8.2)	36.4 (2.4)	30.0 (−1.1)	47.0 (8.3)
Record low °F (°C)	−19 (−28)	−22 (−30)	0 (−18)	21 (−6)	30 (−1)	42 (6)	48 (9)	42 (6)	24 (−4)	21 (−6)	−2 (−19)	−12 (−24)	−22 (−30)
Average precipitation inches (mm)	4.03 (102)	4.89 (124)	5.33 (135)	5.24 (133)	5.68 (144)	4.32 (110)	4.39 (112)	3.81 (97)	3.91 (99)	3.82 (97)	4.54 (115)	5.08 (129)	55.04 (1,398)
Average snowfall inches (cm)	2.6 (6.6)	1.4 (3.6)	0.7 (1.8)	0.1 (0.25)	0.0 (0.0)	0.0 (0.0)	0.0 (0.0)	0.0 (0.0)	0.0 (0.0)	0.0 (0.0)	0.0 (0.0)	0.4 (1.0)	5.2 (13)
Average precipitation days (≥ 0.01 in)	10.3	9.8	10.8	10.7	11.5	9.7	8.7	7.0	7.7	7.7	9.3	11.4	114.6
Average snowy days (≥ 0.1 in)	0.8	1.0	0.5	0.0	0.0	0.0	0.0	0.0	0.0	0.0	0.0	0.3	2.6
Source: NOAA

== Demographics ==
Historical population
Census	Pop.	Note	%±
1880	1,767		—
1890	1,917		8.5%
1900	2,018		5.3%
1910	3,881		92.3%
1920	4,730		21.9%
1930	8,164		72.6%
1940	6,395		−21.7%
1950	8,826		38.0%
1960	9,325		5.7%
1970	9,892		6.1%
1980	10,728		8.5%
1990	9,332		−13.0%
2000	9,763		4.6%
2010	10,156		4.0%
2020	10,316		1.6%

=== 2020 census ===
As of the 2020 census, Paris had a population of 10,316, with 4,467 households and 2,556 families residing in the city. The median age was 41.4 years; 22.9% of residents were under the age of 18 and 22.2% of residents were 65 years of age or older. For every 100 females, there were 87.5 males, and for every 100 females age 18 and over there were 82.7 males age 18 and over.

There were 4,467 households in Paris, of which 27.8% had children under the age of 18 living in them. Of all households, 33.9% were married-couple households, 20.3% were households with a male householder and no spouse or partner present, and 39.2% were households with a female householder and no spouse or partner present. About 37.8% of all households were made up of individuals and 18.5% had someone living alone who was 65 years of age or older.

There were 5,018 housing units, of which 11.0% were vacant. The homeowner vacancy rate was 2.9% and the rental vacancy rate was 8.5%.

96.0% of residents lived in urban areas, while 4.0% lived in rural areas.

Racial composition as of the 2020 census
Race	Number	Percent
White	7,659	74.2%
Black or African American	1,734	16.8%
American Indian and Alaska Native	26	0.3%
Asian	134	1.3%
Native Hawaiian and Other Pacific Islander	0	0.0%
Some other race	176	1.7%
Two or more races	587	5.7%
Hispanic or Latino (of any race)	287	2.8%

=== 2010 census ===
As of the census of 2010, there was a population of 10,156, with 4,394 households and 2,605 families residing in the city. The population density was 897.4 inhabitants per square mile (346.5/km^{2}). There were 4,965 housing units at an average density of 456.4 per square mile (176.2/km^{2}). The racial makeup of the city was 76.99% White, 19.25% African American, 0.34% Native American, 0.64% Asian, 0.01% Pacific Islander, 0.42% from other races, and 2.34% from two or more races. Hispanic or Latino of any race were 1.63% of the population.

There were 4,394 households, out of which 24.8% had children under the age of 18 living with them, 38.5% were married couples living together, 16.8% had a female householder with no husband present, and 40.7% were non-families. 36.8% of all households were made up of individuals, and 19.3% had someone living alone who was 65 years of age or older. The average household size was 2.14 and the average family size was 2.77.

In the city, the ages of population were nearly equally distributed, with 22.94% under the age of 18, 55.89% from 18 to 64, and 21.7% who were 65 years of age or older. For every 100 females, there were 81.5 males. For every 100 females age 18 and over, there were 77.1 males.

The median income for a household in the city was $25,261, and the median income for a family was $32,258. Males had a median income of $27,759 versus $20,198 for females. The per capita income for the city was $15,572. About 14.1% of families and 19.0% of the population were below the poverty line, including 26.6% of those under age 18 and 20.5% of those age 65 or over.

== Industry ==
Local companies manufacture brakes, small electric motors, aftermarket auto parts, metal doors, rubber parts, school laboratory furniture and Ready to Eat Foods.

== Culture ==
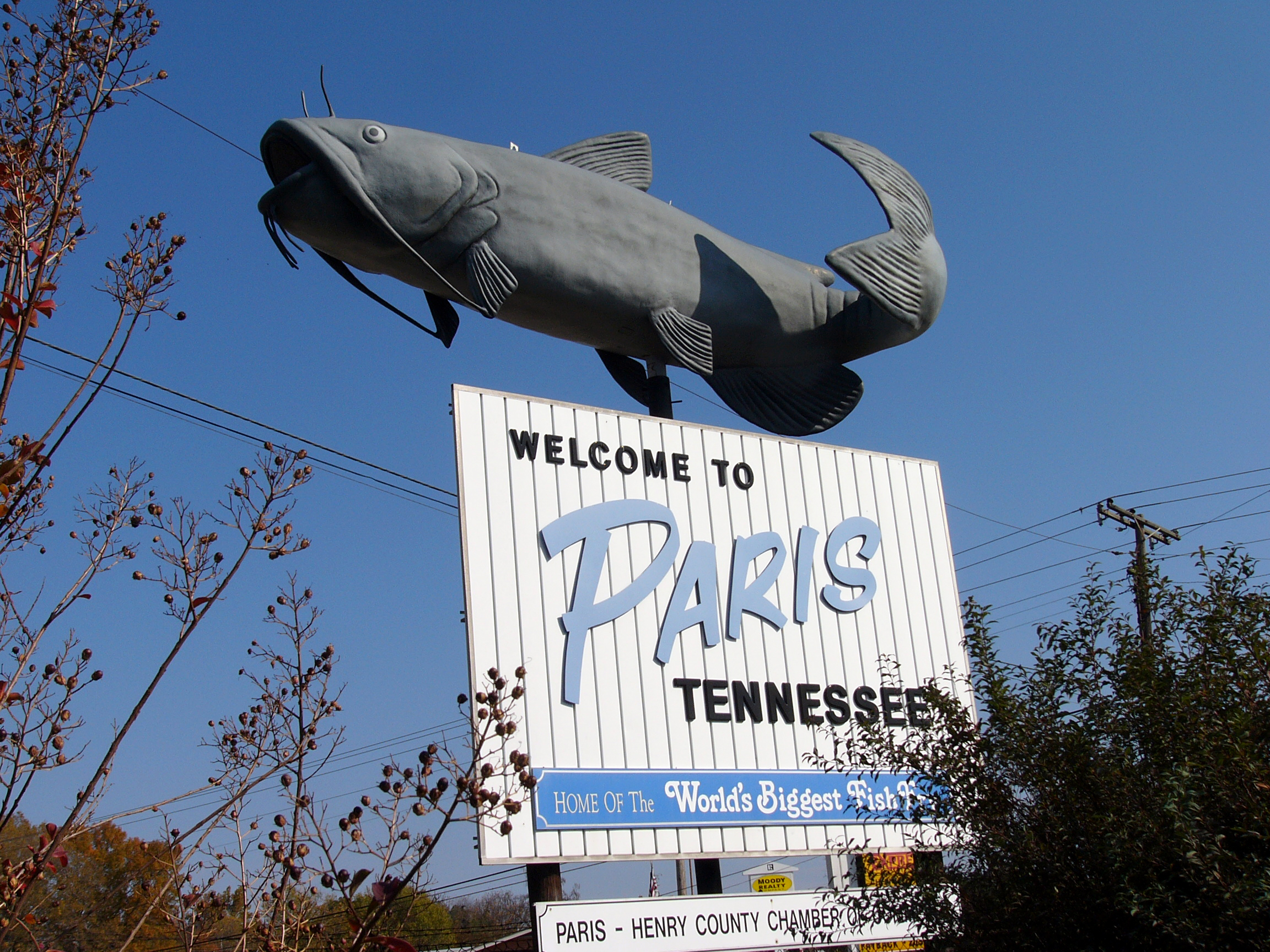
Welcome sign along US 79

=== Eiffel Tower ===
Constructed by students at Christian Brothers University in the early 1990s, the Eiffel Tower was installed in Eiffel Tower Park. The original 65-foot (20 m) wooden tower was later replaced with a 70-foot (21 m) metal structure. The tower is a scale model of the Eiffel Tower in Paris.

Eiffel Tower Park provides tennis courts, a public Olympic-sized swimming pool, soccer fields, two walking trails, two children's playgrounds with pavilions, a splash pad, and a frisbee golf course.

=== Arts ===
Paris is known for its support of the arts. Many large events of musical nature take place in the city's auditorium, the Krider Performing Arts Center. Known as "KPAC", the building is attached to the city's public elementary school, Paris Elementary. Additionally, the Paris-Henry County Arts Council hosts artistic events throughout the year, including Arts 'Round the Square and an annual photography showcase. The Paris Academy for the Arts offers classes and workspace for local artists.

== Sports ==
From 1922 to 1924, Paris was home to a Minor League Baseball team that played in the Kentucky–Illinois–Tennessee League as the Paris Travelers (1922) and the Paris Parisians (1923–1924). HCHS Football team has won the 5A State Championship twice.

== Notable people ==
- John Hall Buchanan, Jr., U.S. Representative of Alabama's 6th Congressional District
- John Wesley Crockett (1807–1852), politician, attorney general
- Rosan "Rattlesnake Annie" Gallimore, country musician
- Edwin Wiley Grove, established Paris Medicine Company 1886, endowed E. W. Grove High School 1906
- Isham G. Harris (1818 – 1897), politician, Tennessee governor, President pro tempore of the United States Senate
- John Hudson, NFL football player, Super Bowl champion Baltimore Ravens in 2000
- Howell Edmunds Jackson, Tennessee House of Representatives, United States Senate, U.S. Supreme Court justice
- Vernon Jarrett, political activist, social commentator, Chicago Tribune
- Mordecai Wyatt Johnson, preacher, president of Howard University
- Bobby Jones, gospel musician
- Cherry Jones, Tony Award-winning actress
- Merle Kilgore, country musician, songwriter, manager
- Charles Gilbert "Chick" King, MLB, outfielder, Detroit Tigers, Chicago Cubs, and St. Louis Cardinals
- Keith Lancaster, singer, songwriter, and founder of The Acappella Company
- Vernon McGarity, Congressional Medal of Honor 1946
- Bobby Olive, former NFL wide receiver for the Indianapolis Colts
- James D. Porter (1828–1912), American politician, judge of the 12th Judicial Circuit of Tennessee,Tennessee governor
- Thomas Clarke Rye, attorney general of the 13th Judicial District, Tennessee governor
- Edward H. Tarrant (1796–1848), American politician, namesake of Tarrant County, Texas
- Stephen M. Veazey, president, Community of Christ
- Hank Williams Jr., country musician, has a home "near Paris"
- Felix Zollicoffer (1812 – 1862), American newspaperman, politician, and soldier
- Gin Cooley, model
- Jim Cullivan, football coach, born and died in Paris

== Paris/Henry County media ==
Radio stations

- WHNY AM/1000
- W248BK FM/97.5
- WHNY-FM FM/104.7
- WLZK FM/94.1 - "94.1 The Lake"
- WRQR-FM FM/105.5 - KF99-KQ105
- WTPR AM/710 - WENK-WTPR
- WTPR FM/101.7

Newspapers

- The Paris Post-Intelligencer
