= WENK =

Radio station in Union City, Tennessee

Coordinates: 36°25′28″N 89°2′17″W

WENK/WTPR-AM-FM
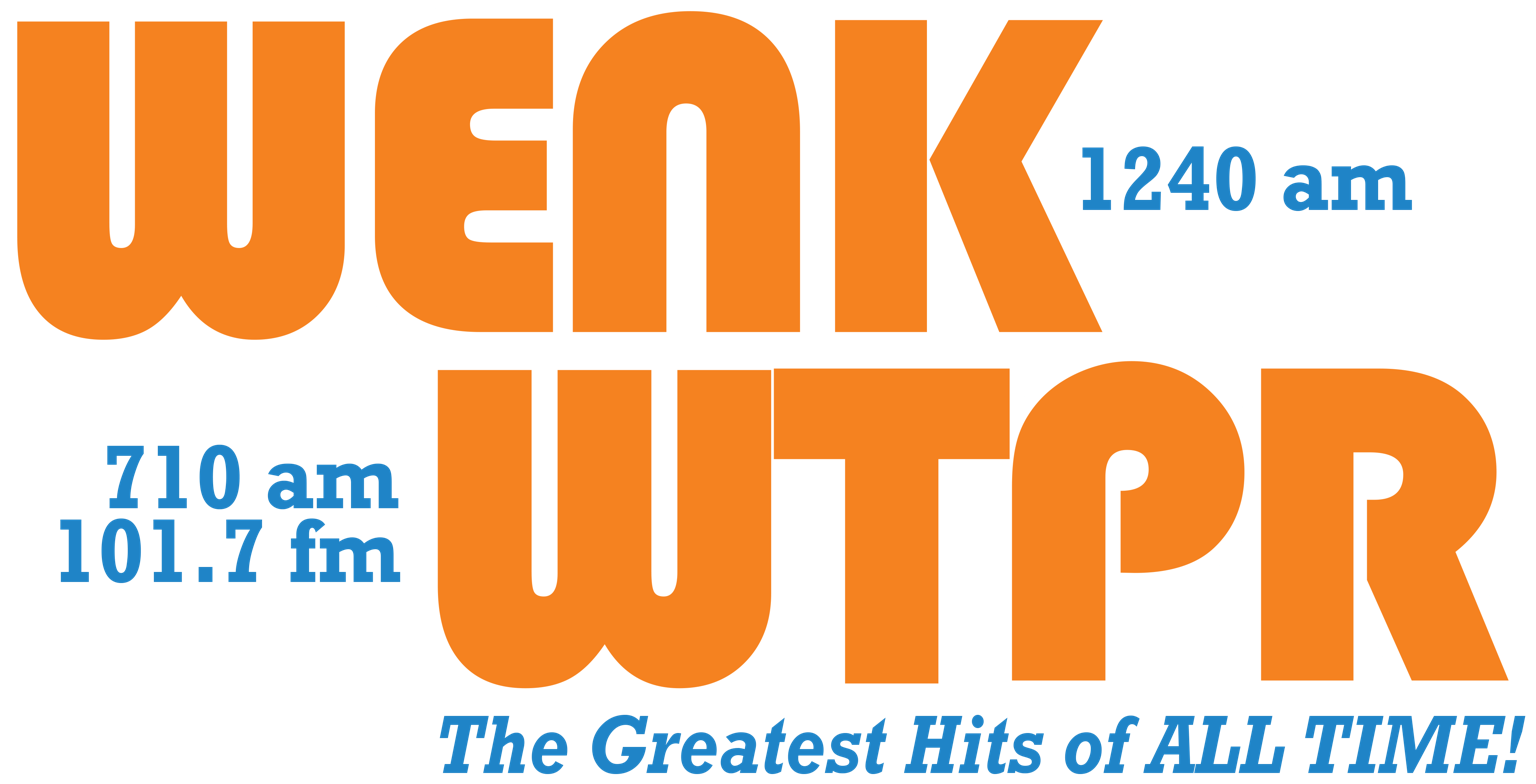
- WENK: Union City, Tennessee WTPR: Paris, Tennessee WTPR-FM: McKinnon, Tennessee; United States
- Broadcast area: Northwest Tennessee
- Frequencies: WENK: 1240 kHz; WTPR: 710 kHz; WTPR-FM: 101.7 MHz
- Branding: WENK-WTPR

Programming
- Format: Oldies

Ownership
- Owner: Forever Communications; (Forever South Licenses, LLC)
- Sister stations: WHDM, WHNY, WHNY-FM, WLZK, WRQR-FM, WWGY

History
- First air date: WENK: October 26, 1946; WTPR: 1947; WTPR-FM: March 14, 1988 (as WTWL at 101.5)
- Former call signs: WTPR-FM: WTWL (1988–1994)
- Former frequencies: WTPR-FM: 101.5 MHz (1988–2005)
- Call sign meaning: WENK: unknown WTPR: West Tennessee Paris Radio

Technical information
- Licensing authority: FCC
- Facility ID: WENK: 71504; WTPR: 71503; WTPR-FM: 12496
- Class: WENK: C WTPR: D WTPR-FM: A
- Power: WENK: 1,000 watts WTPR: 750 watts day
- ERP: WTPR-FM: 1,800 watts
- HAAT: WTPR-FM: 185 meters
- Translator: WENK: 95.5 W238CU (Union City)

Links
- Public license information: Public file; WENK: 71504 WTPR: 71503 WTPR-FM: 12496 LMS
- Website: www.radionwtn.com

WENK is an AM radio station based in northwest Tennessee.

== History ==
In its first incarnation, WENK 1240 went on the air with 250 watts day and night from the upstairs of a furniture store on October 26, 1946. WTPR 710 went on the air with 250 watts daytime from the second floor of a building on the square in downtown Paris in 1947. Both were owned by the Dixie Network of Jackson, Tennessee. and had at the time a variety format.

WENK featured the talents of people like Hank Huggins and Lou Wrather during the early days. WTPR was home to future Nashville star Ralph Emery and future WPSD-TV newsman Dan Steele.

WENK caught the Rock and Roll bug in 1956, and for the most part remained a popular music or Top 40 station until WWKF took that format in 1982. John Dixon Williams, a future WPSD-TV newsman and general manager was an early star. WTPR continued to play a variety of music over the years.

WENK increased its power to 1,000 watts in the early 1960s and WTPR was able to increase its power to 1000 watts daytime as well. During this period personalities like J. R. Moore and Ed Taylor were heard on WENK, along with Jolly George and John True. WTPR featured Bill McCutcheon. The late Gary Powley who worked at WTPR in the 1990s and until his death in 2005 actually got his start at WENK in 1968.

Present day President and General Manager Terry Hailey followed Gary Powley at WENK in 1968 and has been with the station ever since. Cindy Snyder was one of the driving forces behind WTPR in the 1980s and 1990s. Joe Van Dyke was long time general manager at WTPR for the Dixie Network.

WENK purchased WTPR in 1989. WTPR then adopted WENK's oldies format which continues today. WTWL, Dover/McKinnon, was added in 1994 with callsign changed to WTPR-FM. The station was on 101.5, but changed to 101.7 in June 2005. WENK, WTPR and WTPR-FM are now a three-way simulcast of ‘The Greatest Hits of All Time’ and are on AM1240, AM710 and FM101.7. The stations can be heard in southeast Missouri, northeast Arkansas...and all across northwest Tennessee and southwest Kentucky from Reelfoot Lake to Kentucky Lake to Clarksville. Their sister stations WWGY and WRQR-FM (KF99/KQ105) play contemporary hit music or Top 40, the format they took from WENK in 1982.

Effective December 28, 2016, WENK of Union City sold WENK, WTPR, WTPR-FM, WAKQ, and WWKF to Forever Communications for $500,000.

== Sister stations ==
- WWGY 99.3: Fulton, Kentucky/Union City, Tennessee
- WRQR-FM 105.5: Paris, Tennessee
