= Otis Leon McCoy =

American singer-songwriter (1897–1995)

- Born: February 17, 1897
- Died: March 27, 1995 (aged 98)
- Occupations: Singer-songwriter, music teacher
- Relatives: Thomas Jackson Denson (grandfather); Seaborn McDaniel Denson (great-uncle)

Otis Leon McCoy (February 17, 1897 – March 27, 1995) was an American gospel singer-songwriter and music teacher. He was the president of Tennessee Music and Printing, the publishing company of the Church of God, and he wrote hundreds of Southern gospel hymns.

== Early life ==
McCoy was born on February 17, 1897. His grandfather was Thomas Jackson Denson and his great-uncle was Seaborn McDaniel Denson. McCoy learned to sing Sacred Harp music from his grandfather, and he was educated at the James D. Vaughan School of Music in Lawrenceburg, Tennessee.

== Career ==
McCoy was a singer-songwriter of Southern gospel. From 1923 to the 1930s, McCoy was a member of the Vaughan Radio Quartet, a band whose members included Adger M. Pace, William Burton Walbert and Hilman Barnard. In 1942, McCoy joined the Homeland Harmony Quartet, whose members included James McCoy, B. C. Robinson, and Connor Brandon Hall. Over the course of his career, McCoy wrote hundreds of Southern gospel hymns, including Keep On The Firing Line and Heaven Bound Train.

McCoy worked for the James D. Vaughan Publishing Company in Lawrenceburg. In 1931, he became the founding president of Tennessee Music and Printing, the publishing company of the Church of God in Cleveland, Tennessee. He served again as its president from 1934 to 1945, 1947 to 1952, and 1958 to 1961.

== Death and legacy ==
McCoy died in 1995. He was inducted into the Southern Gospel Museum and Hall of Fame in 2003.
