= National Gospel Singing Convention =

The National Gospel Singing Convention is an annual Southern gospel music event, and has played a significant part in the development of Gospel music.

The convention was established by the most prominent publishers of shape note song books in 1936, including the Morris-Henson Company, the Vaughan Quartet, James D. Vaughan Music Publishers, the Hartford Music Company, A. J. Showalter Company, Denson Music Company, Theodore Sisk Music Company, Tennessee Music and Printing Company, George W. Sebren, W. P. Ganus, and the Stamps Baxter Music and Printing Company. The first event was held in 1936 in Atlanta, Georgia, with Adger M. Pace serving as the convention's first president.

In 1949, the convention's constitution was revised so that state singing conventions would have voting privileges in addition to music publishers. In 1961, Stella Vaughan wrote an article for Vaughan's Family Visitor newsletter that chronicled the convention's first twenty-five years. The convention has continued as an annual event for more than 70 years, rotating among small towns throughout the United States (typically in the South). Lawrenceburg, Tennessee, home of the original Vaughan Publishing Company and generally regarded as the birthplace of Southern Gospel music since 1910, hosted the 1991, 1996, 2006, and 2015 conventions.

The current president of the convention is former president of the Georgia State Gospel Singing Convention, Cameron B. Holloway. The 2023 session will take place at the historic Orange United Methodist Church outside Canton, Georgia on November 17 and 18, 2023.

== National Gospel Singing Convention ==
Year	President	Location
1936	Adger M. Pace	Atlanta, Georgia
1937	Adger M. Pace	Birmingham, Alabama
1938	Otis L. McCoy	Old Hickory, Tennessee
1939	W. Lee Higgins	Greenville, South Carolina
1940	W. Lee Higgins	Akron, Ohio
1941	George W. Sebren, J. M. Henson acting	Asheville, North Carolina
1942	W. B. Walbert	Charleston, West Virginia
1943	W. Lee Higgins	Akron, Ohio
1944	J. A. McClung, J. M. Henson acting	Detroit, Michigan
1945	J. M. Henson	Decatur, Georgia
1946	Adger M. Pace	Monticello, Arkansas
1947	Frank Stamps	Montgomery, Alabama
1948	W. Lee Higgins, Harley Lester acting	Cleveland, Tennessee
1949	G. K. Vaughan	Greenville, South Carolina
1950	M. J. Beasley	Birmingham, Alabama
1951	W. H. (Bill) Fleming	Conway, Arkansas
1952	Roscoe Long	Gainesville, Georgia
1953	Gaskell Warren	Cookeville, Tennessee
1954	Earl Crowson	Louisville, Mississippi
1955	H. A. Waltman	Mobile, Alabama
1956	Mrs. C. H. (Mom) Rushing	Tulsa, Oklahoma
1957	J. E. Wheeler	Porterville, California
1958	Ray Wyatt	Pell City, Alabama
1959	Earl Crowson	Louisville, Mississippi
1960	A. B. Taylor	Live Oak, Florida
1961	Videt Polk	Pass Christian, Mississippi
1962	Nolin Jeffress	Crossett, Arkansas
1963	Gaskell Warren	Cookeville, Tennessee
1964	J. S. Cooksey	Tifton, Georgia
1965	Willie Weems	Forest, Mississippi
1966	Videt Polk	Pass Christian, Mississippi
1967	Oliver S. Jennings	Madison, Tennessee
1968	Arch Gibson	Plainview, Texas
1969	Connor B. Hall	Cleveland, Tennessee
1970	Lewis Miller	Cullman, Alabama
1971	Nolin Jeffress	Hot Springs, Arkansas
1972	Videt Polk	Pass Christian, Mississippi
1973	E. F. (Gene) Roberts	Cookeville, Tennessee
1974	Ernest Latta	Tulsa, Oklahoma
1975	J. C. Cobb	Albertville, Alabama
1976	Talmadge Johnson	Roswell, New Mexico
1977	Arthur Watson	Stephenville, Texas
1978	Nolin Jeffress	Hot Springs, Arkansas
1979	J. W. Payne	Blairsville, Georgia
1980	Gary Davis	Ruston, Louisiana
1981	Christine (Martin) Moore	Winter Haven, Florida
1982	Theron Lee	Cullman, Alabama
1983	W. C. Taylor, Jr.	Kingsport, Tennessee
1984	Ernest Latta	Tulsa, Oklahoma
1985	Nolin Jeffress, Walker Watson acting	Hot Springs, Arkansas
1986	James W. Tennyson	Jackson, Mississippi
1987	Jake Brown, Mickey Marlow acting	Stephenville, Texas
1988	David Leach	Henryetta, Oklahoma
1989	J. T. Dean	Hot Springs, Arkansas
1990	Curtis Nelson	Decatur, Alabama
1991	Jimmy Glass	Lawrenceburg, Tennessee
1992	Bobby Keys	Cartersville, Georgia
1993	Eugene McCammon	Knoxville, Tennessee
1994	Mike Pace	Stephenville, Texas
1995	Pauline Thompson	Corsicana, Texas
1996	Jimmy Glass	Lawrenceburg, Tennessee
1997	Wynona Browning	Fayette, Alabama
1998	Billy Henderson	Ruston, Louisiana
1999	Vera Miller	Decatur, Alabama
2000	C. B. Anderson	Jacksonville, Texas
2001	Charles Jefferson	Sallisaw, Oklahoma
2002	K. Wayne Guffey	Trenton, Georgia
2003	Jeff Y. Gregory	Westmoreland, Tennessee
2004	Marty Phillips	Crossett, Arkansas
2005	Wynona Browning	Hamilton, Alabama
2006	Byron L. Reid	Lawrenceburg, Tennessee
2007	Everette Driskell	Pass Christian, Mississippi
2008	June Walker	Waco, Georgia
2009	Melba (Hutson) Bounds	Nashville, Arkansas
2010	Glen Taylor	Baton Rouge, Louisiana
2011	Iris Bass	Rainsville, Alabama
2012	Gay (Pace) Young	Monticello, Arkansas
2013	Susan Bollman	Mount Pleasant, Texas
2014	Jo Parker	Wetumpka, Alabama
2015	Jimmy Glass	Lawrenceburg, Tennessee
2016	Linda (Wedgeworth) Hight	Carthage, Texas
2017	Dylan Feezell	Houston, Alabama
2018	Crandall Woodson	Tucker, Georgia
2019	Andy Browning	Weatherford, Texas
2020	Carl Gregory	Tupelo, Mississippi Postponed until 2022 due to COVID-19
2023	Cameron B. Holloway	Canton, Georgia resigned due to political infighting
2023	Gay Young	Wilmar, Arkansas
2024	Sarah McKamie	Gatesville, Texas
