= Lee Roy Abernathy =

American gospel musician

- Born: August 13, 1913; Cartersville, Bartow County, Georgia
- Died: May 25, 1993 (aged 79) Canton, Georgia
- Genres: Southern gospel music
- Occupations: Southern gospel musician, songwriter and performer

Lee Roy Abernathy (1913–1993) was a Southern gospel musician, songwriter, and performer.

He created the first gospel sheet music in 1943, which he was able to send out by mail. According to the New Georgia Encyclopedia, he "invented a music typesetting system, pioneered the use of public address systems in gospel concerts, and wrote the first singing commercials."

== Biography ==
Abernathy was born on August 13, 1913, in the Atco community of Cartersville, Bartow County, Georgia. His father was Dee Abernathy.

He married Louise Ammons in the early 1930s, and they had three children, Hugh, Linda, and Susan.

== Music ==
Abernathy's first musical experience came with his father’s group, the Atco Quartet, at the age of five where his dad sang bass. His parents instilled a love for quartet music and the tradition of gospel singing conventions, where he learned to read shape notes. He was able to sing harmony with the quartet while standing on a Coca-Cola crate. He studied music under James D. Vaughan, J. M. Henson, and Adger M. Pace.

In the 1930s, he founded the Modern Mountaineers, performing live on Atlanta's WSB (AM). In 1936, he wrote "Good Times Are Coming Soon," a reelection campaign song for President Franklin D. Roosevelt.

He wrote many gospel songs, including "He’s A Personal Savior", "A Newborn Feeling", and "I Thank My Savior for It All", but his signature song was "A Wonderful Time Up There". Some pastors objected to its jazz beat, which influenced the early career of Elvis Presley. Abernathy disregarded the criticism, believing that he had written the song as a result of divine inspiration. The song was later called the "Gospel Boogie" and was recorded by numerous quartets, as well as Johnny Cash, Johnny Mathis, and Pat Boone. Boone's recording of the song reached number four on the Billboard charts in 1958.

Abernathy wrote "Burning of the Winecoff Hotel" following the tragic Winecoff Hotel fire in Atlanta in 1946. He was a frequent guest of the hotel and would have been at the hotel on the night of the fire, but had gone home when a friend gave him a gasoline ration stamp.

Abernathy became the pianist for the Homeland Harmony Quartet in 1947. He also performed with the Rangers Quartet, Jubilee Quartet, Miracle Men, Happy Two, and Abernathy All Star Quartet. Happy Two appeared on their own daily WAGA-TV television show in Atlanta beginning in 1951 and continued for seven years, at one point reaching the top three shows in the Nielsen ratings.

== Political life ==
Abernathy launched a campaign for Georgia governor in 1958. He finished far back in third in the Democratic party primary behind William Bodenhamer and the eventual winner, Ernest Vandiver.

== Death and legacy ==
Abernathy continued to teach piano and voice lessons until his death on May 25, 1993. He was 79 years old. He was buried at Cherokee Memorial Park in Canton, Georgia.

He is a member of the Gospel Music Hall of Fame and the Southern Gospel Music Association Hall of Fame. In 1989 he received the Mary Tallent Pioneer Award from the Georgia Music Hall of Fame.

The "Annual Memorial Lee Roy Abernathy Singing" is held in Canton in his honor.
