= WKSR =

WKSR may refer to:

- WKSR (AM), a radio station (1420 AM) licensed to serve Pulaski, Tennessee, United States
- WLFM (FM), a radio station (103.9 FM) licensed to serve Lawrenceburg, Tennessee, which held the call sign WKSR-FM from 2014 to 2016
- WLXA, a radio station (98.3 FM) licensed to serve Loretto, Tennessee, which held the call sign WKSR-FM from 1995 to 2014
