= WDXE =

WDXE may refer to:

- WDXE (AM), a radio station (1370 AM) licensed to serve Lawrenceburg, Tennessee, United States
- WLXA, a radio station (98.3 FM) licensed to serve Loretto, Tennessee, which held the call sign WDXE-FM from 2014 to 2016
- WLFM (FM), a radio station (103.9 FM) licensed to serve Lawrenceburg, Tennessee, which held the call sign WDXE-FM from 1964 to 2014
