= William Burton Walbert =

American singer (1886–1959)

- Born: May 18, 1886; Barren County, Kentucky, U.S.
- Died: December 2, 1959 (aged 73); Birmingham, Alabama, U.S.
- Occupation: Hymn writer
- Spouse: Mable Grace Vaughan
- Children: 1 son
- Relatives: James David Vaughan (father-in-law)

William Burton Walbert (May 18, 1886 – December 2, 1959) was an American Southern gospel songwriter, singer, composer, and editor. He (co-)wrote many songs, and he was the director of the Vaughan School of Music in Lawrenceburg, Tennessee.

== Early life ==
Walbert was born in Barren County, Kentucky on May 18, 1886. He attended the Vaughan School of Music in Lawrenceburg, Tennessee.

== Career ==
Walbert worked for the James D. Vaughan Music Company, where he taught shape note singing schools. After James D. Vaughan's death, Walbert took charge of the school.

Walbert was also a music performer. In 1917, he joined the Vaughan Saxophone Quartet with Joe Allen, Ira Foust and Adger M. Pace. From 1923 to the 1930s, Walbert was a member of the Vaughan Radio Quartet, a band whose members included Pace, Hilman Barnard, and Otis Leon McCoy.

Walbert (co-)wrote many Southern gospel songs, including Peace Like a River, Oh, What a Blessing, Tell It Everywhere You Go, and I've Never Loved Him Better.

== Personal life and death ==
Walbert married Mable Grace Vaughan, James David Vaughan's daughter, in 1915. They had a son, James D. Walbert, who became a pianist.

Walbert died of a stroke on December 2, 1959, in Birmingham, Alabama, at age 72. His funeral was held in Lawrenceburg. He was inducted into the Southern Gospel Music Hall of Fame in 1959.
