= Winter storm naming in the United States =

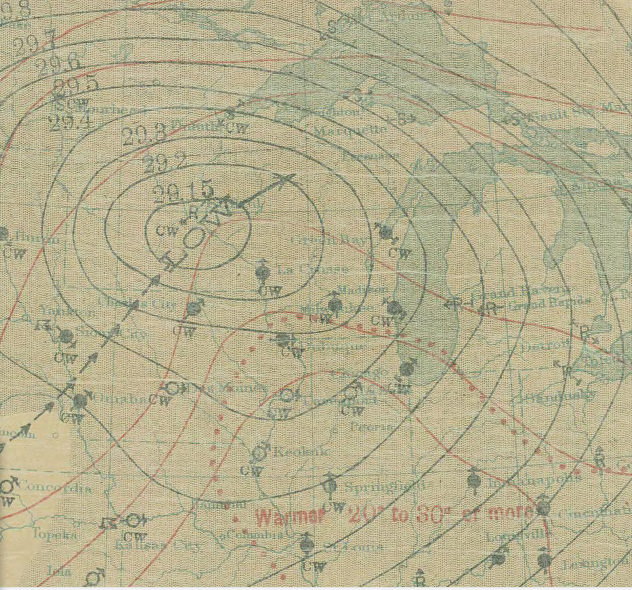
The "Mataafa Storm" of 1905 was named after SS Mataafa, which was wrecked during the storm.

In the United States, names of winter storms have been coined using schemes such as the days of the year that the storm impacted or noteworthy structures that the storm had damaged and/or destroyed. In the 2010s, winter storm naming became controversial with The Weather Channel coming up with its own list of names for winter storms similar to that of hurricanes.

The marketing and hype of weather became a big part of media revenue by the 1990s (see Weather media in the United States). The Weather Channel critics contend that the naming of winter storms was a way to hype winter weather on the East Coast between Virginia and Connecticut. Although the region on average sees far less snow than many areas of the USA, it has the largest media market. Most government and research meteorologists argue that winter storms can reform more than once, making the process of naming them both difficult and redundant. The United States National Weather Service (NWS) has refrained from commenting on the system and stated that they do not name winter storms.

== Background ==
The practice of using names to identify weather systems goes back several centuries, with systems named after places, saints or things they hit before the formal start of each naming scheme. Examples include The Great Snow of 1717, The Schoolhouse Blizzard (1888), the Mataafa Storm, the Storm of the Century (1993). Credit for the first usage of personal names for weather is generally given to the Queensland Government Meteorologist Clement Wragge, who named tropical cyclones and anticyclones between 1887–1907. This system of naming weather systems subsequently fell into disuse for several years after Wragge retired, until it was revived for typhoons in the latter part of the Second World War.

Named days of the calendar for storms include a storm that hit in 1940 called the Armistice Day Blizzard, a storm in Oregon in 1962 called the Columbus Day Storm, a storm in 1976 called the Groundhog Day gale, and more recently a storm in 1991 dubbed the Halloween blizzard. The twentieth century closed with two more storms that received names. In 1997, a blizzard that impacted the Northeastern United States was called the April Fool's Day Blizzard.

Storms of the twenty-first century include the South Valley Surprise of 2002 that impacted Oregon. During 2006 a major winter storm that impacted Colorado was dubbed the Colorado Holiday Blizzards. During October 2012 after informally using the previously coined name "Snowtober" for the 2011 Halloween nor'easter, The Weather Channel announced that it was going to start naming winter storms from a predetermined list of names. The Weather Channel argued that the winter storm names would improve communications of storm warnings and help reduce storm impacts. Private agencies, and news stations have also named storms in recent years that have received international media attention. These names include "Snowmageddon", "Snowzilla", and other voted upon names such as Anna, after former First Lady Anna Harrison.

From the winter of 1998–99 until 2012–13, the United States National Weather Service (NWS) Weather Forecast Office in Buffalo, New York, unofficially named lake-effect snow storms after the event, using various themes including insects, heavenly bodies, famous scientists, minerals and cows.

== Notable media ==
=== WFSB Channel 3, Connecticut ===
During the winter of 1971–72, meteorologist Ken Garee of the Travelers Weather Service in Hartford, Connecticut, started to name winter storms, in order to help educate the WTIC television and radio audiences about the rapid movement of winter storms. Over the years, the naming scheme was continued by the staff of WFSB Channel 3 with a variety of different themes used to name the systems, including the top baby names of 1957, the children of Channel 3, and Connecticut towns.

Currently systems are named if they are forecast to produce over 6 in (15 cm) of snow over the majority of the state or at least 1/2 the amount of ice accretion an average ice storm would produce over the area. Critics say it is a way to hype the rather brief winter season in Connecticut. According to WFSB, the naming of winter storms has had a mixed reaction over the years, with some viewers criticizing it; however, the majority of their viewers found it fun and loved the tradition.

=== WLUK Fox 11, Wisconsin ===
During the late 1980s, WLUK-TV meteorologist John Chandik started to name winter storms alphabetically, after communities in the station's viewing area in northeastern Wisconsin. Over the next few years, the naming scheme continued with a fresh list of names developed internally every year and started to use people names for the winter storms, as it did not make sense to name a system e.g. Florence if the majority of the snow was in Appleton or Oshkosh. Today systems are most commonly named if they are forecast to produce over 5 in (13 cm) of snow over WLUK Fox 11's viewing area, or if a major ice storm occurs which has the potential for power outages and driving hazards. WLUK has found that their naming of winter storms has had a mixed reaction over the years, with some communities taking it as a source of pride and fun, while others do not like the naming scheme.

=== The Weather Channel ===
During Halloween 2011, a nor'easter impacted the northeastern United States and was nicknamed "Snowtober" by various media outlets and on social media, which prompted The Weather Channel (TWC) to put the nickname on air, where it took off. As a result, commercial weather services started to informally investigate naming winter storms and realized that Twitter needed a hashtag for every system so that information could be filtered. During October 2012, TWC announced that 3 of their senior meteorologists would start proactively naming noteworthy winter storms, using names from a predetermined list of 26 Roman and Greek names. TWC argued that the naming scheme would raise awareness and make communications and information sharing easier, which in turn would make it easier for people to understand forecasts, leading to better planning, preparedness, and results with less impact overall. The initial reaction to TWC's naming scheme was mixed as most people did not have a problem with it, while others were not happy that TWC had not consulted the rest of the meteorological community on the initiative, and called it self-serving and not in the interest of effective weather communication. After considering TWC's press release and various other factors, the founder and president of the commercial weather service Accuweather, Joel Myers, suggested that TWC had "confused media spin with science and public safety." He also stated that Accuweather had explored the issue for 20 years and had concluded that it "was not good science" that would "mislead the public" and noted that "winter storms were very different from hurricanes". At the time, the NWS made no comment about the naming system but noted that they did not name winter storms.

After TWC named its first system in November 2012, the NWS Eastern Region headquarters reminded its forecast offices that it does not name winter storms. The NWS Weather Forecast Office in Buffalo, New York unofficially named six systems after the fact during the winter of 2012–13. After reading a headline entitled "Brutus expected to bury Bozeman", students at the Bozeman High School in Montana reached out to TWC and provided them with four years' worth of classical Latin and Greek names as they wanted to raise awareness of the languages. During the season, TWC did not use any quantitative method to name the systems and started to use the names provided by the students after it had exhausted the list of names that it had preselected. After the season had ended, TWC reviewed the systems it had assigned a name to and felt that 90% of the systems deserved to be named, based on the impacts they had on a regional and national basis. They also determined that the project had been a success; after over a billion impressions were recorded on Twitter and numerous schools, agencies and media outlets had also started to use it. As a result, they decided to use the named storms of 2012–13 as a benchmark and developed a quantitative method for deciding when to name future storms, which they entitled the Integrated Meteorological Population and Area Calculation Tool (IMPACT). This tool allowed TWC to calculate the population and area that is forecast to be impacted by a winter storm, based on thresholds set by the NWS for winter weather warnings and advisories.

As a result, they decided that they would name a storm during the 2013–14 season if it was forecast to impact over 2 million people or 400,000 km^{2} (150,000 mi^{2}); it was noted that the storm naming committee could override the guidance in certain circumstances. Over the next few years, TWC continued to develop the science behind their naming scheme and collaborated with the Latin class at Bozeman High School to release a new set of 26 names each year.

Despite the unofficial status of TWC's naming system, the winter storm names are used by news outlets, government agencies, airlines, and utility providers.

== United States government naming policy ==
The U.S. government-operated National Oceanic and Atmospheric Administration (NOAA) (a division of which—the National Hurricane Center—has named hurricanes for many years), and its main division—the National Weather Service (NWS)—did not acknowledge TWC's winter storm names and asked its forecast offices to refrain from using the TWC names. In a November 2012 memo, it requested that its employees avoid referring to storms by name. NWS spokesperson Susan Buchanan stated, "The National Weather Service does not name winter storms because a winter storm's impact can vary from one location to another, and storms can weaken and redevelop, making it difficult to define where one ends and another begins." The National Weather Service has stated that "no plans to consider naming winter storms" are in progress.

== Reception ==
Private weather forecaster AccuWeather disagreed with the practice of naming winter storms in 2013. AccuWeather president Joel N. Myers stated in February 2013, "The Weather Channel has confused media spin with science and public safety. We [...] have found this is not good science and will mislead the public." In defense of TWC's practice, TWC's Norcross said, "The fact is, a storm with a name is easier to follow, which will mean fewer surprises and more preparation." Media organizations such as The New York Times and The Washington Post later stated that they would not use a name such as "Winter Storm Nemo" for the February 2013 nor'easter. However, some outlets such as New York mayor Michael Bloomberg's office used the Twitter hashtag "#nemo" to refer to the storm. Tom Kines of AccuWeather stated, "The Weather Channel probably names the storms because it gets the publicity." TWC relies on its TV audience and page views for revenue as the weather service is privately owned. Other claims include TWC naming the storms as a form of an advertisement campaign. Other stations/organizations have decided to use their own naming system, which only adds to the confusion that abounds.

Doctoral candidate Adam Rainear from the University of Connecticut stated that the names do not add credibility based on a study he had done on impacts. Rainear argued that hurricane names were adopted as a useful tool for mariners to help warn ships of the storm's path. He points out though, that no "data" supports the notion of The Weather Channel drawing in more people by naming winter storms. The AP Stylebook issued an update in 2018 advising that "Major storm names provided by government weather agencies, the European Union or World Meteorological Organization are acceptable." then went on to say "Do not use names created by private agencies or other organizations." This change affects news and media sources that rely on the Associated Press.

== AMS committee ==
During 2017 an ad-hoc subcommittee of the American Meteorological Society's Committee on the Effective Communication of Water and Climate Information investigated the naming of winter storms, in order to see if the United States weather enterprise and National Weather Service should adopt a winter storm naming process. The Committee requested and received several presentations on naming schemes from The Weather Channel and elsewhere. The committee also consulted with the NWS who noted that collaboration would be needed with Canada and Mexico, while the agency that named the systems would need to be neutral. The NWS also noted that its participation in any research did not imply an endorsement of the naming scheme or commitment to an operational change and that it did not have any plans to invest any money in this area.

The committee subsequently found that there was no strong evidence that naming winter storms enhanced safety and that the major intent behind naming winter storms was to help communications with the general public and decision-makers. Members of the committee subsequently commented that they felt better informed after these presentations, but were not able to come to a consensus on if the United States weather enterprise should adopt a naming process for winter storms. In particular, members felt like they needed more information before they could make an informed opinion and suggested that further research was needed around the naming criteria, why and how the TWC names are used and into any potential harm of naming weather systems. They also suggested that the issue should be moved up to either the AMS Board on Enterprise Communication or the AMS Board of Best Practices.

== See also ==
- Winter storm naming in Europe
- Tropical cyclone naming
- Snowmageddon
