= WLLX =

Coordinates: 35.282306°N 87.105°W

- Lawrenceburg, Tennessee; United States
- Broadcast area: Southern Middle Tennessee
- Frequency: 97.5 MHz
- Branding: 97.5 - 98.3 WLX

Programming
- Format: Commercial; Country; News, Weather
- Affiliations: Fox News Radio

Ownership
- Owner: Prospect Communications
- Sister stations: WDXE, WKSR, WLXA, WWLX

History
- First air date: February 20, 1981

Technical information
- Licensing authority: FCC
- Facility ID: 53664
- Class: C2
- ERP: 42,000 watts
- HAAT: 161 meters (528 ft)

Links
- Public license information: Public file; LMS
- Webcast: Listen Live
- Website: www.radio7media.com/index.php/wlx-home

WLLX (97.5 FM) is a Class C2 FM radio station serving the southern Tennessee area. The station was one of the first in the nation to own and operate a live, color weather radar system and distribute the images to its listeners via a subcarrier on the primary FM signal.

The station has had a successful history of serving the community in times of breaking news and severe weather conditions. WLLX was granted a construction permit by the Federal Communications Commission (FCC) in 2005 to upgrade its power from 25 kW to 50 kW. The project was completed and the station signed on the air in mid-January 2006 serving a population total near 3.5 million in the area south of Nashville, Tennessee to just north of Birmingham, Alabama.

The station is based in Lawrenceburg, Tennessee.

On August 5, 2008, WLLX split its simulcast with WWLX. The AM station re-launched with a new branding, "Classic Hits WLX" and a network of FM translators that cover Southern Middle Tennessee. In July 2014, Classic Hits WLX was re-launched as "105.3 The X" with a revised Classic Rock music format in addition to local sports coverage.

Both stations are owned and operated by Prospect Communications.

== Television ==
WLLX was one of the parent companies that founded the now independent Tennessee Valley Weather, a 24/7 weather channel carried on a host of digital platform and local cable provider affiliates. In 2020, they purchased a dual polarimetric doppler weather radar following an EF-1 tornado that struck Lawrenceburg on February 5, 2020.

== Translators ==
WLLX's programming is also carried on three broadcast translator stations to extend or improve the coverage area of the station.

Call sign	Frequency	City of license	FID	ERP (W)	Class	FCC info
W232DY	94.3 FM	Lawrenceburg, TN	53668	250	D	LMS
W264AD	100.7 FM	Columbia, TN	72482	250	D	LMS
W263AE	100.5 FM	Lewisburg, TN	31795	250	D	LMS
