= 1958 Georgia gubernatorial election =

1958 Georgia Democratic gubernatorial primary
- September 10, 1958

410 county unit votes 206 unit votes needed to win
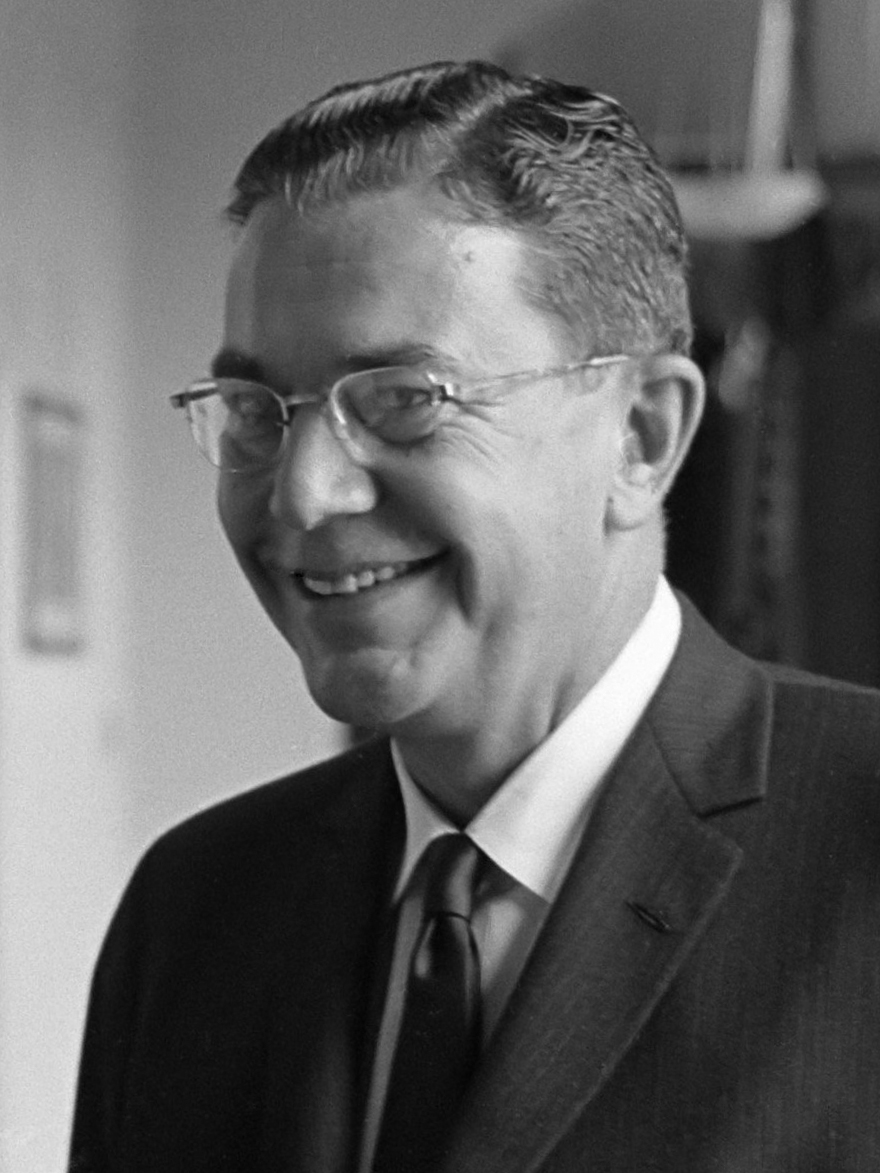

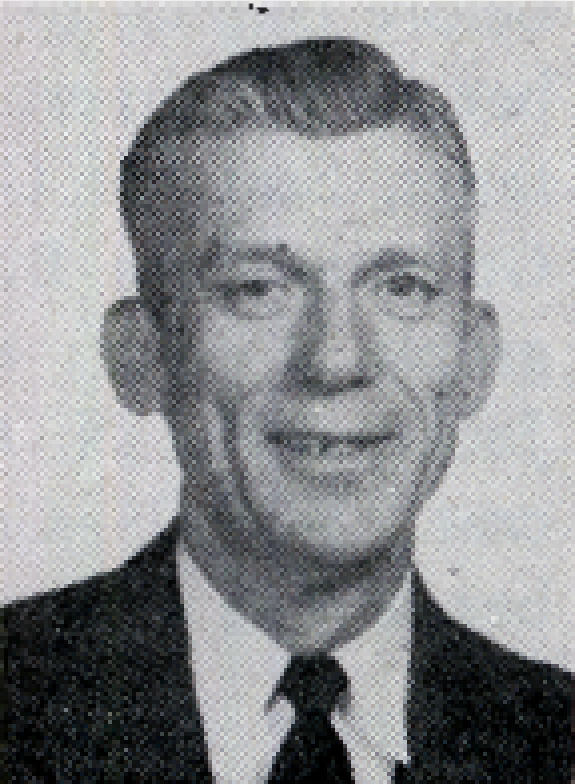

Nominee	Ernest Vandiver	William Bodenhamer	Lee Roy Abernathy
Party	Democratic	Democratic	Democratic
Electoral vote	400	10	0
Popular vote	499,477	87,830	33,099
Percentage	80.51%	14.16%	5.34%
- Vandiver: 50–60% 60–70% 70–80% 80–90% >90% Bodenhamer: 50–60%
Governor before election
Marvin Griffin
Democratic
Elected Governor
Ernest Vandiver
Democratic

The 1958 Georgia gubernatorial election was held on November 4, 1958.

Lieutenant Governor Ernest Vandiver won the Democratic primary on September 10 with 80.51% of the vote and 400 out of 410 county unit votes. At this time, Georgia was a one-party state, and the Democratic nomination was tantamount to victory. Vandiver won the November general election without an opponent.

== Democratic primary ==
=== County unit system ===
From 1917 until 1962, the Democratic Party in the U.S. state of Georgia used a voting system called the county unit system to determine victors in statewide primary elections.

The system was ostensibly designed to function similarly to the Electoral College, but in practice the large ratio of unit votes for small, rural counties to unit votes for more populous urban areas provided outsized political influence to the smaller counties.

Under the county unit system, the 159 counties in Georgia were divided by population into three categories. The largest eight counties were classified as "Urban", the next-largest 30 counties were classified as "Town", and the remaining 121 counties were classified as "Rural". Urban counties were given 6 unit votes, Town counties were given 4 unit votes, and Rural counties were given 2 unit votes, for a total of 410 available unit votes. Each county's unit votes were awarded on a winner-take-all basis.

Candidates were required to obtain a majority of unit votes (not necessarily a majority of the popular vote), or 206 total unit votes, to win the election. If no candidate received a majority in the initial primary, a runoff election was held between the top two candidates to determine a winner.

=== Candidates ===
- Lee Roy Abernathy, Southern gospel singer
- William T. Bodenhamer, Baptist preacher and state legislator from Ty Ty
- Ernest Vandiver, Lieutenant Governor of Georgia

=== Campaign ===
Bodenhamer ran a "biblical segregationist" campaign aligned with incumbent Governor Marvin Griffin, whom Vandiver had alienated during their term together. He opened his campaign by showing pictures of Vandiver between two Negro politicians and said, "Birds of a feather flock together." He accused Vandiver of being "the candidate of the NAACP." Vandiver responded by promising that "no, not one" black would be admitted to Georgia's white schools.

Lee Roy Abernathy, a gospel singer from Canton who frequently appeared on Atlanta television, also ran on a platform promising to diminish the powers of the governor and make monthly television reports to the people of Georgia.

=== Results ===
Candidate	Popular vote		County unit vote	
Candidate	Votes	%	Votes	%
Ernest Vandiver	499,477	80.51	400	97.56
William T. Bodenhamer	87,830	14.16	10	2.44
Lee Roy Abernathy	33,099	5.34		
Write-in	3	0.00		
Total	620,409	100.00	410	100.00

In the decisive county unit count, Vandiver won 400 out of 410 votes, with Bodenhamer winning the remaining ten. This was the last primary election held under the county unit rule, which was ruled unconstitutional by the Supreme Court of the United States in Gray v. Sanders.

== General election results ==
1958 Georgia gubernatorial election
Party	Candidate	Votes	%	±%
Democratic	Ernest Vandiver	168,414	100.00%	

== Legacy ==
Georgia writer Flannery O'Connor wrote about the election in a letter describing the choice of candidates as "the present lieutenant governor whose only visible merit is good looks, 2) a hillbilly singer, Leroy the Boy Abernathy and 3) a rabid preacher, who claims to be backed by the Bible".
