= Adger M. Pace =

American songwriter (1882–1959)

Adger McDavid Pace
- Born: August 13, 1882
- Died: February 12, 1959 (aged 76); Lawrenceburg, Tennessee, U.S.
- Occupation: Hymn writer

Adger M. Pace (August 13, 1882 - February 12, 1959) was an American hymn writer, music performer and teacher. He (co-)wrote close to 4,000 Southern gospel shape note songs, including Jesus Is All I Need, My Father Answers Prayers, Beautiful Star of Bethlehem, and Peace, Sweet Peace.

== Early life ==
Pace was born on August 13, 1882. He had two brothers and three sisters.

== Career ==
Pace was hired by James David Vaughan as the music editor of his publishing company, the James D. Vaughan Publishing Company. Pace also taught at the Vaughan School of Music in Lawrenceburg, where one of his students was Ottis J. Knippers, a singer-songwriter who served as a judge and a member of the Tennessee House of Representatives. Pace authored two musical textbooks.

Pace was also a music performer. In 1917, he joined the Vaughan Saxophone Quartet with Joe Allen, Ira Foust and William Burton Walbert. From 1923 to the 1930s, Pace was a member of the Vaughan Radio Quartet, a band whose members included Walbert, Hilman Barnard and Otis Leon McCoy.

Over the course of his career, he co-wrote nearly 4,000 Southern gospel songs, including Jesus Is All I Need, My Father Answers Prayers, The Homecoming Week, Beautiful Star of Bethlehem, The Glad Reunion Day, Keep Holding On, The Happy Jubilee, and Peace, Sweet Peace. With Benjamin Franklin White, he co-wrote Lone Pilgrim.

== Personal life, death and legacy ==
Pace married Johnnie Ryals. They had two sons and a daughter. They resided at 622 North Military Avenue in Lawrenceburg, Tennessee.

Pace died of a stroke on February 12, 1959, in Lawrenceburg, at age 76. His piano is at the James D. Vaughan Memorial Museum in Lawrenceburg.

== Selected works ==
- Pace, Adger M. (1916). Pace's Modern Harmony and Voice-leading: A New and Complete System for the Study of Harmony and Composition, by Rules of Voice-leading, Simplified so the Student Can Learn the Art with or without a Teacher. Lawrenceburg, Tennessee: J. D. Vaughan. OCLC 39254590.
- Pace, Adger M. (1951). Vaughan's Up-to-date Rudiments and Music Reader. Lawrenceburg, Tennessee: James D. Vaughan. OCLC 3347969.
