= WWLX =

- Loretto, Tennessee; United States
- Frequency: 590 kHz C-QUAM AM Stereo
- Branding: 106.1 & 93.1 The X

Programming
- Format: Variety hits
- Affiliations: Fox News Radio

Ownership
- Owner: Prospect Communications; (Roger Wright)
- Sister stations: WDXE, WKSR, WLLX, WLXA

History
- First air date: 1987

Technical information
- Licensing authority: FCC
- Facility ID: 53665
- Class: D
- Power: 600 watts day 133 watts night
- Transmitter coordinates: 35°12′12.00″N 87°19′39.00″W
- Translators: 93.1 W226AF (Loretto); 106.1 W291DG (Lawrenceburg)

Links
- Public license information: Public file; LMS
- Webcast: Listen Live
- Website: The X Website

WWLX (590 AM) is a radio station broadcasting a variety hits format, Licensed to Loretto, Tennessee, United States, the station is currently owned by Prospect Communications.

WWLX was a simulcast of sister station WLLX until August 2008 when it was re-branded as "Classic Hits WLX" and launched with a network of FM translators that cover Southern Middle Tennessee. In July 2014 Classic Hits WLX was re-launched as "105.3 The X" with a revised classic rock music format in addition to local sports coverage. On May 1, 2016 WWLX switched to a simulcast of country-formatted WLLX.

== Previous logo ==
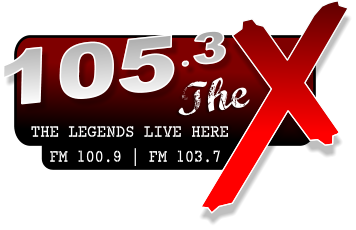
