= Tennessee Valley Weather =

Television station in Tennessee, United States

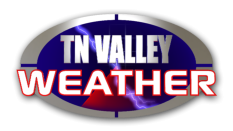
- Original logo, used from 2020 to 2023; it remains in use with minor alterations to the background and text
- Type: Weather television
- Country: United States
- Broadcast area: Southern Middle Tennessee (Maury to Hardin counties eastward to Lincoln and Marshall counties); Northern Alabama (Madison and Morgan counties westward); Tishomingo County, Mississippi
- Headquarters: Lawrenceburg, Tennessee, U.S.

Programming
- Language: English
- Picture format: 1080i (HDTV)

Ownership
- Owner: Tennessee Valley Media Group

History
- Founded: April 2020
- Launched: April 12, 2020 (5 years ago)

Links
- Webcast: Tennessee Valley Weather livestream
- Website: www.tnvalleyweather.com

Tennessee Valley Weather is a local streaming and cable weather television channel owned by Tennessee Valley Media Group, and headquartered in Lawrenceburg, Tennessee. It provides daily weather forecasts and local severe weather information for 16 counties in North Alabama, Southern Middle Tennessee and Northeast Mississippi, covering southern portions of the Nashville and most of the Huntsville–Decatur–Florence media markets.

The channel offers a linear television feed—offering live updates and automated loops of forecast maps and radar images—available on various over-the-top streaming platforms (such as YouTube and Roku) and local cable providers, along with radio updates and social media posts. Tennessee Valley Weather is the flagship service of the Lawrenceburg-based National Weather Network, a collective of over-the-top digital weather television services founded in May 2023. (As of January 2026, the group consists of 16 current and future member affiliates based in twelve U.S. states.)

== History ==
Due to the location of the Tennessee Valley within Dixie Alley, a region prone to violent and long-tracked tornadoes, much focus has been given to researching and improving warnings for weather events affecting the region. Lawrence County, Tennessee is the site of the only recorded F5-rated tornado in Tennessee history, dubbed "The Forgotten F5", occurring on April 16, 1998 as part of a broader significant tornado outbreak that impacted the region.

One of the parent companies, Lawrenceburg, Tennessee radio station WLLX, has owned a weather radar since 1987 for general precipitation observation. On February 5, 2020, an EF1 tornado impacted the town of Lawrenceburg with little warning, leading to discussions of the necessity of better warning processes. Subsequently, Tennessee Valley Weather (co-founded by longtime WLLX meteorologists Ben Luna and Fred Gossage) launched on April 2, 2020, following WLLX owner Prospect Communications' acquisition of Florence, Alabama-based digital weather information provider Shoals Weather.

In 2022, Luna and Kevin Wright spun off Tennessee Valley Weather into a separate multimedia company, Tennessee Valley Media Group. On January 19, 2025, Tennessee Valley Weather became one of the six founding member affiliates of the National Weather Network collective of multi-platform digital weather channels.

== Programming ==
Tennessee Valley Weather produces live weather updates five times per day Monday through Friday and twice daily on weekends; most of its broadcast day, however, is filled by an automated loop of maps and graphics outlining current and forecasted weather conditions across the viewing area and the United States, accompanied by an "L-bar" datascreen displaying current conditions for Lawrenceburg and Florence, as well as weather alerts and extended forecasts for various cities across the primary 16-county viewing area.

The channel also provides live coverage of severe weather impacting the region, in the event warnings are issued by the National Weather Service offices in Huntsville and Nashville. The channel's chief meteorologist, Fred Gossage, produces a weekly educational segment highlighting the science behind the area's weather. Tennessee Valley Weather also owns and operates a network of weather cameras located in 18 communities throughout the Tennessee Valley region.

== Technology ==
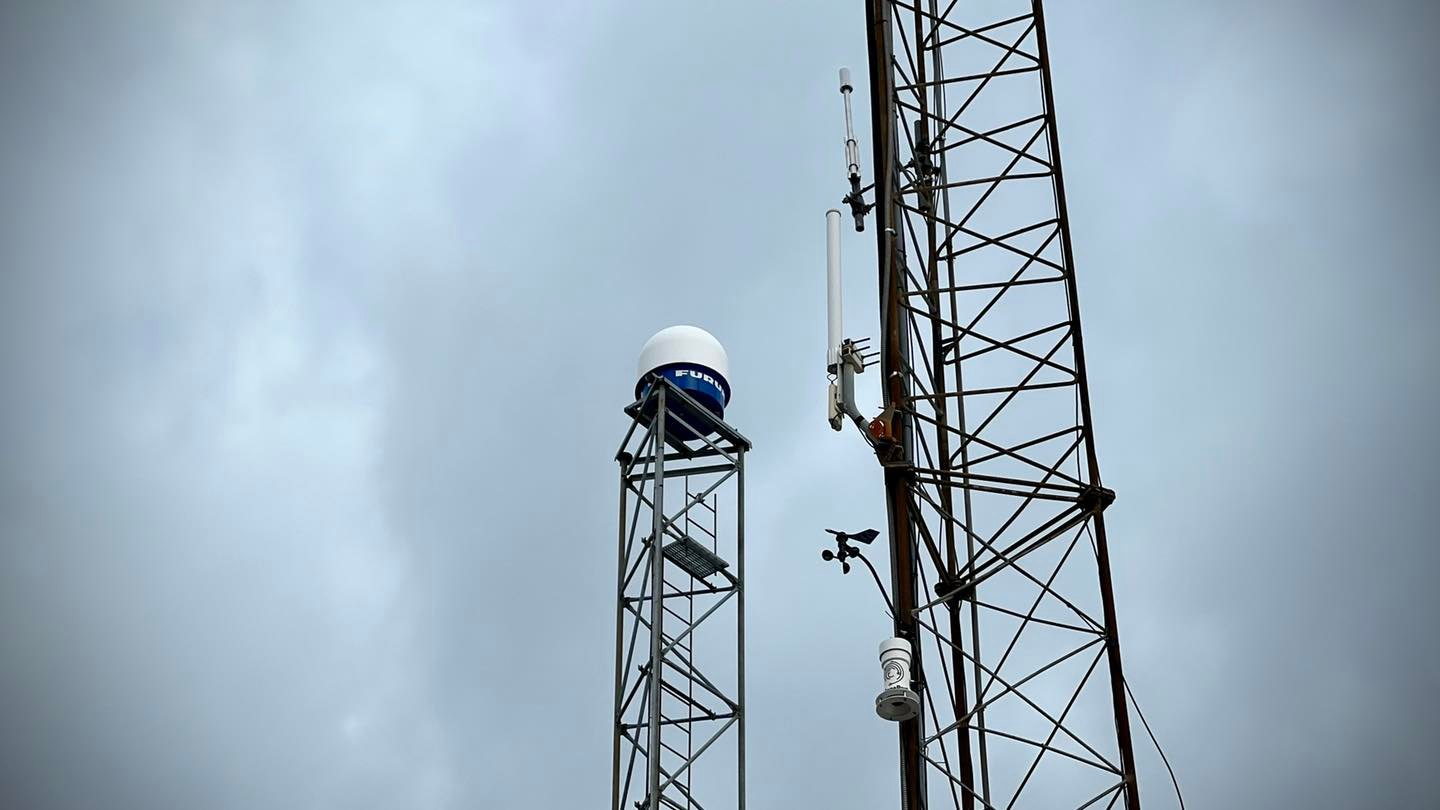
Doppler Radar stationed in Lawrenceburg, Tennessee

Tennessee Valley Weather employs a wide array of technology, including Baron Services' Lynx graphics system, a Furuno WR2120 Dual Polarimetric Doppler weather radar, for which it founded the non-profit Tennessee Valley Weather Radar Foundation, and a network of weather sensors and live cameras. The network also operates a mobile app available in both the Apple App Store and Google Play.

== Notable on-air staff ==
- Ben Luna – managing meteorologist (longtime WLLX broadcaster and former WAAY-TV weekend meteorologist)
- Fred Gossage – chief meteorologist (co-founder of Shoals Weather and former WBRC weather operations assistant)
- Bryan Wilson – weekend meteorologist (expert radar technician)
- Kelli Rosson – afternoon weekday meteorologist (former WYMT-TV meteorologist)
