= News media in the United States =

American reporting on current events

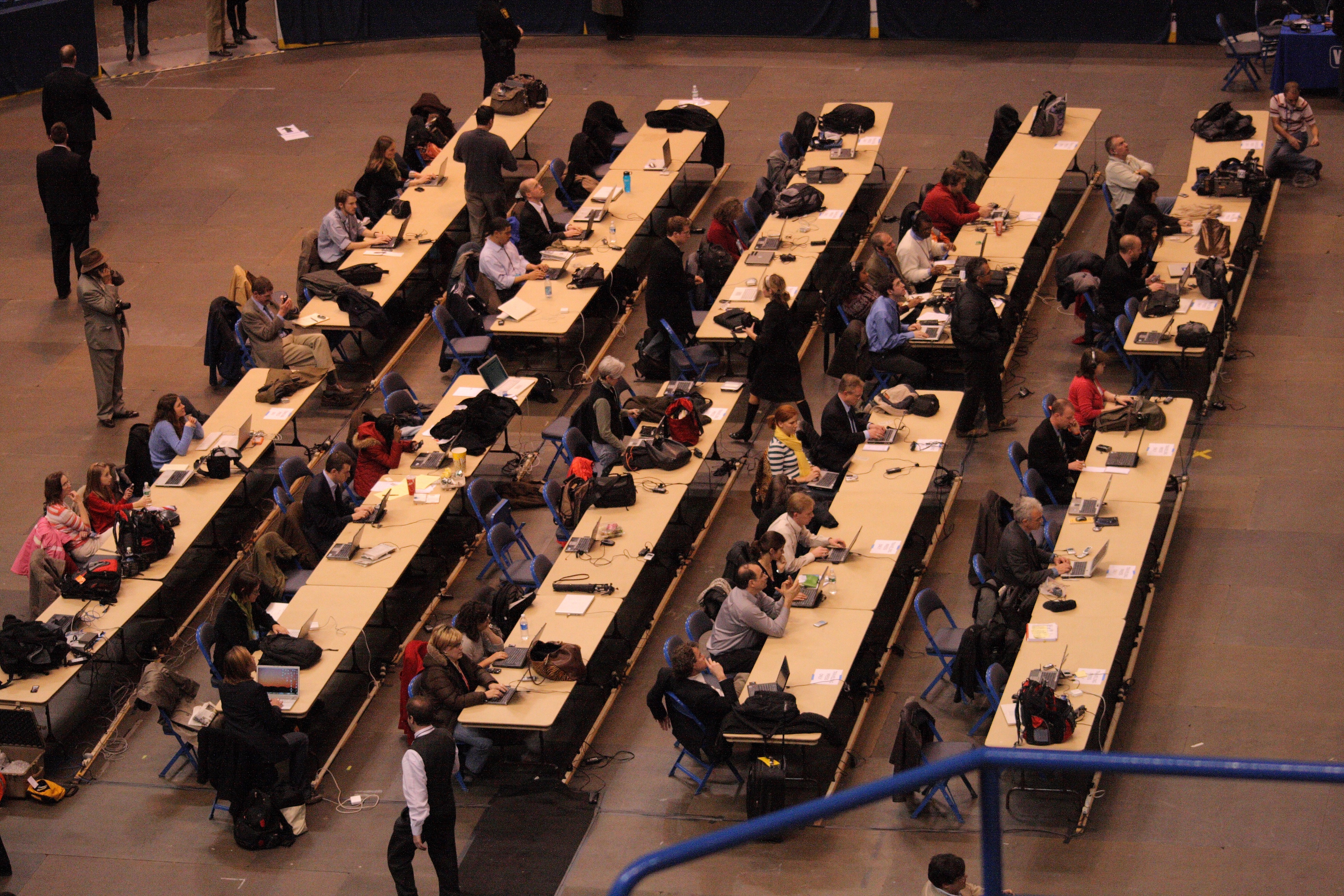
Tables for journalists reporting on a political rally for Barack Obama in Hartford, Connecticut in February 2008

Mass media are the means through which information is transmitted to a large audience. This includes newspapers, television, radio, and more recently the Internet. Organizations that provide news through mass media in the United States are collectively known as the news media in the United States.

== History ==
Journalism in the United States began humbly and became a political force in the campaign for American independence. Following independence, the first amendment to the U.S. Constitution guaranteed freedom of the press and freedom of speech. The American press grew rapidly following the American Revolution. The press became a key support element to the country's political parties, but also for organized religious institutions.

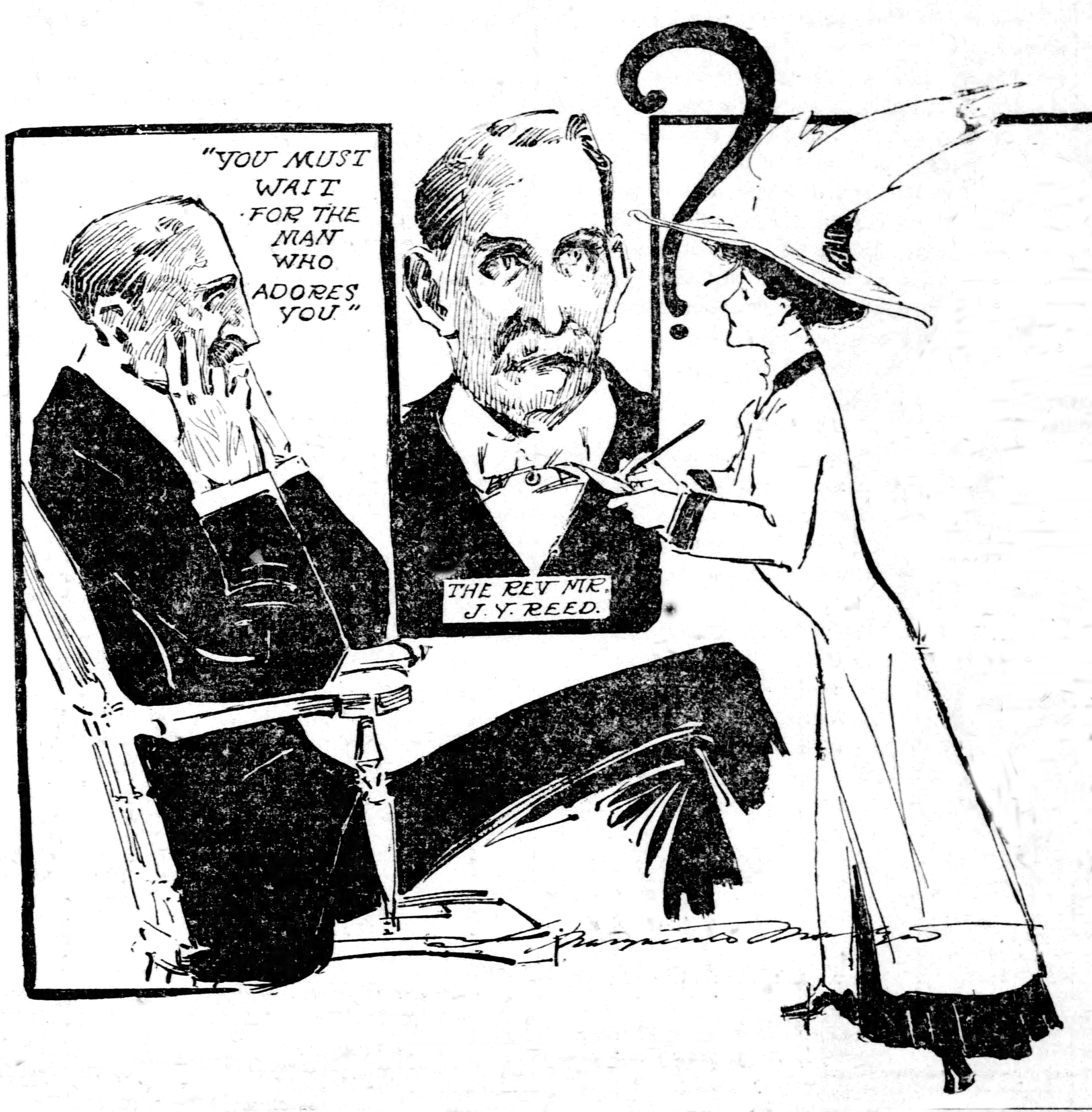
Journalist Marguerite Martyn of the St. Louis Post-Dispatch made this sketch of herself interviewing a Methodist minister in 1908 for his views on marriage.

During the 19th century, newspapers began to expand and appear outside the cities of the Eastern United States. From the 1830s onward the penny press began to play a major role in American journalism. Technological advancements such as the telegraph and faster printing presses in the 1840s helped expand the press of the nation, as it experienced rapid economic and demographic growth.

By 1900, major newspapers had become profitable powerhouses of advocacy, muckraking and sensationalism, along with serious, and objective news-gathering. Starting in the 1920s, technological change again changed American journalism as radio and television began to play increasingly important roles.

In the late 20th century, much of American journalism merged into big media conglomerates (principally owned by media moguls like Ted Turner and Rupert Murdoch). With the coming of digital journalism in the 21st Century, newspapers faced a business crisis as readers turned to the internet for news and advertisers followed them.

== Mergers and Acquisitions ==
Mergers and acquisitions have reshaped the American news industry over the past several decades, driven by declining print advertising, the rise of digital-first models, and private equity involvement.

One of the most notable deals was Amazon founder Jeff Bezos's 2013 purchase of The Washington Post for $250 million, a personal acquisition rather than a corporate merger, which brought new technology investment to a legacy newspaper. That same year, AOL had already acquired The Huffington Post in 2011 for roughly $315 million, folding it into AOL's media division before Verizon later absorbed both AOL and Yahoo into the Oath (later Verizon Media) portfolio.

Print consolidation accelerated with Gannett's 2019 merger with GateHouse Media, creating the largest newspaper chain in the country by title count, spanning hundreds of local papers. Around the same period, Alden Global Capital, a hedge fund known for aggressive cost-cutting, expanded its holdings through Digital First Media and later took full control of Tribune Publishing in 2021, acquiring titles such as the Chicago Tribune and New York Daily News.

BuzzFeed acquired HuffPost from Verizon Media in 2021 in a stock deal, and had earlier acquired the sports and culture outlet Complex Networks. IAC, which had spun off various media properties, merged its Dotdash publishing unit with Meredith Corporation's national media group in 2021, forming Dotdash Meredith and combining titles like People, Better Homes & Gardens, and Investopedia. Univision's sale of Gizmodo Media Group properties (including Deadspin, Jezebel, and The Onion) in 2019 led to the creation of G/O Media under private equity ownership.

Vice Media, once a highly valued digital news brand, filed for bankruptcy in 2023 and was subsequently acquired by a group of its lenders, including Fortress Investment Group, in a deal reflecting the broader struggles of venture-backed digital journalism. Similarly, Vox Media pursued growth through acquisitions such as New York Media (publisher of New York Magazine) in 2019, while G/O Media later sold The Onion to Global Tetrahedron in 2024.

== Structure ==
=== Non-profit ===
The Public Broadcasting Service (PBS) is the primary non-profit television service, with 349 member public broadcasters. News and public affairs programs include PBS NewsHour, Frontline, and Washington Week. In September 2012, PBS rated 88% above CNN in public affairs programming, placing it competitively with cable news outlets but far behind private broadcasters ABC, CBS, and NBC. Due to its local and non-profit nature, PBS does not produce 24-hour news, but some member stations carry MHz WorldView, NHK World, or World as a digital subchannel.

National Public Radio (NPR) is the primary non-profit radio service, offered by over 900 stations. Its news programming includes All Things Considered and Morning Edition.

PBS and NPR are funded primarily by member contributions and corporate underwriters, with a relatively small amount of government contributions.

Other national public television program distributors include American Public Television and NETA. Distributors of radio programs include American Public Media, Pacifica Radio, Public Radio International, and Public Radio Exchange.

Public broadcasting in the United States also includes Community radio and College radio stations, which may offer local news programming.

=== Major outlets ===
Name	Means of distribution	Main media type(s)	Founded/launched
ABC News	Television, online, radio	News	1945
CBS News	Television, magazines, formerly radio	News	1927
CNN	Television, online	News, politics	1980
Fox News	Television, online, radio	News, politics	1996
MS NOW	Television, online	News, politics	1996
NBC News	Television, online, radio	News	1940
The New York Times	Newspapers, online	News, sports	1851
USA Today	Newspapers, online	News	1982
The Wall Street Journal	Newspapers, online	News	1889
The Washington Post	Newspapers, online	News	1877
Politico	Online	News, politics	2007
Bloomberg	Online, radio	World news	1981
Vice News	Online	News	2013
HBO	Online, television	Entertainment	1972
HuffPost	Online	News	2005
TMZ	Online	Celebrity news	2005
CNET	Online	Tech news	1994
NPR	Radio, online	News, politics, arts	1970
Pacifica Radio	Radio	News, politics	1946
The Hollywood Reporter	Magazines, online	Hollywood film	1930
Newsweek	Magazines, online	News	1933
The New Yorker	Magazines, online	News	1925
Time	Magazines, online	News	1923
U.S. News & World Report	Magazines, online	News	1948

=== Social media as a news source ===
News consumption on social media in 2021 was down 5% from what it was in 2020. A 3rd of Facebook users accessed news from their site.While almost all of the Twitter (now X) uses that were served got access to news from their site. The users accessing news on X is down about 4% from 2020, while Facebook is down 7%. Women use Facebook more to access new that men do by 31%, and men get their news from X 13% more than women do. Ages 30-49 are likely to use Facebook for news more than any other age range. Whereas 18-29 year olds are more likely to get it from X than any other age. White people are more likely than any other group surveyed to use both Facebook and X for news.

This article from 2021 in the American Journalism Handbook finds that social media for news consumption has become very Central with 42 to 53% of Americans using social media as a new source. This figure has grown tremendously since 2013.Research cited article reveals that people who primarily find their news or get their news on social media demonstrate lower levels of factual knowledge and are more likely to encounter misinformation. At the same time, there is growing support for the moderation of false information online, but it is still divided. It was also identified that there is a growing dependency on certain platforms by journalistic outlets. for example, Facebook's prioritization of videos in 2015 affected the way news is spread on social media.

A 2025 article by the Pew Research Center states that in the US, just over half of adults reported that they had gotten news from social media. 38% of US adults reported using Facebook to regularly get news, while 35% reported using YouTube as a news source.Followed by Instagram, TikTok, and then X, formerly Twitter. Of the users on X, 57% reported getting their news from X. Similarly, 55% do the same with Truth Social.There was a jump in reports of TikTok users using TikTok to interact with news, from 22% in 2020 to 55% in 2025.The people who are more likely to consume their news from TikTok, Instagram, and X are younger people. Also, your race affects your likelihood of reporting getting your news from Instagram or YouTube. As well as your education, it can also affect where you are likely to get your news.

Trust in news organizations and social media in the United States has been on a steady decline as of late, and there are many noticeable ways in which it has dropped. Per a 2025 Pew Research Center survey, roughly 56% of adults in the United States reported having some trust in the national news organizations they consume. However, this number has decreased drastically from when another survey was conducted in early 2025, by about 11% and roughly 20% from around a decade ago. Even though there is still more trust in local news outlets than national news organizations, which is at around 70%, this too has seen a decline over time. Political affiliation plays a crucial role in these numbers. For example, Republican-leaning independents and Republicans are far less likely than Democrats in reporting their trust in national news, even though trust has decreased on both sides of the aisle. Another important factor to consider is age range. Individuals who are 30 or younger tend to get their news information from social media platforms like Instagram or Tiktok. Adults that are older than 30 are the exact opposite. They tend not to trust social media and instead trust more traditional news organizations.

The 2025 Digital News Report which is the 14th Edition of this report. Shows that the use of X (Formerly Twitter) as a news source is up 8 points in the US from prior years.While the fear of being able to discern Misinformation is up to 73% in the United States.54% of people report accessing news via social media. People 35 and under are more likely to access news on social media.

Both reports give different numbers for the percent of people who access social media to view news, but they claim the same thing that the use of social media as a news source has increased in recent years. Also, there are certain ages or races that use social media more to interact with the news.

This study examined how audiences used social media platforms as news sources.Many users in this report reported encountering news while using social media, and not actively seeking it out.Findings from this report suggest that younger users are significantly more likely to engage with the access news on social media than older users.Social media is important for sharing, commenting, and discussing the news with others.This study concluded that social media does not and cannot fully replace traditional news sources like television or direct sites; instead, social media should function as a way to direct the users to those sites or those external sources.

In 2017, a Digital Journalism report found that more positive news stories performed significantly better and went viral on platforms like YouTube and Twitter (now X) than negative stories did.It was also identified in the study that new stories' social significance, like economic, political, and cultural, would also do better, and unexpected things happening were also prominent in viral news elements like humor, sexuality, animals, and children were less likely to appear.There were also differences in platforms. YouTube had more awe-inspiring, positive content that went viral, while Twitter had more surprising stories, such as the ones that ranked highest.The findings show that stories that invoked positive emotions or had social significance, and sometimes were unexpected, were more likely to become viral on social media.

In 2018, the American Press Institute released a study in which they focused on specific patterns of public attitudes and news consumption in the United States. They collected their data using a national survey and found that Americans receive their news across a wide spectrum of platforms like social media, websites, mobile applications, newspapers, and television. Their findings concluded that many adults still received their news from the television, and found that older adults had even higher numbers because they don't use social media as often. The younger demographic of Americans reported relying on digital platforms and social media to stay informed with news. The study done by the American Press Institute emphasized the multi-platform nature of news consumption among Americans, with many respondents stating that they actually use several sources instead of one to make an informed opinion on the accuracy and reliability of the information they receive. Additionally, the study also found that most news exposure online occurs incidentally, meaning that Americans aren't going on social media just to see the news. This only occurs in an online setting, and does not necessarily pertain to consuming news on the television.

Scholarly research has shown the extent of the spreading of misinformation on social media and news organizations. One example of misinformation being spread is when the COVID-19 pandemic struck the globe in early 2020. Studies were conducted to research into platform design features like algorithms that show what it deems as important to the user based on engagement and the kind of videos/news that someone likes. Since social media is built on algorithms and tailoring to your taste, mass misinformation was able to spread at great lengths. False claims like the vaccine having microchips and how it is contracted began to circulate the internet at lightning speed. More specifically, content that evoked strong emotional reactions received more engagement, this reinforcing individuals' beliefs about the virus. Researchers also looked at psychological factors and how they were related to the pandemic and seeking information. Key terms like confirmation bias, and partisan identity were of the utmost importance to the researchers and their work. They found that when individuals were subjected to unverified claims regarding the virus, they deemed it as credible and accurate, which was most certainly not the case. During this time, there was very little protection and verification on posts that were made public online.

The goal of this article was to identify Health misinformation and their prevalence on different social media platforms they accomplished this by searching through published articles about health misinformation on social media.The results of this study were that misinformation about smoking drugs like opioids and marijuana was the most misinformation about them at around 87%.And the second most which was 43%, was about vaccines.The social media platforms that contain the most misinformation was Twitter (now X).And the topics that had the most misinformation about them were smoking and drugs, vaccines, and diseases.

== Agenda-setting ==
An important role which is often ascribed to the media is that of agenda-setter. Georgetown University professor Gary Wasserman describes this as "putting together an agenda of national priorities — what should be taken seriously, what lightly, what not at all". Wasserman calls this "the most important political function the media perform". Agenda-setting theory was proposed by McCombs and Shaw in the 1970s and suggests that the public agenda is dictated by the media agenda.

An article from EBSCO Research discussed the mass media and political agenda-setting theory as it relates to political communication. The theory was first introduced by Donald Shaw and Maxwell McCombs around the 1970s, and initially proposed that mass media influences the public agenda by molding which issues are deemed as important to the American public. Instead of telling people what opinions they should have, media coverage affects which topics gain the most attention and engagement, and that they are considered transparent in public discourse. Agenda-setting spans across many media platforms that include digital outlets, print, and broadcast. It also says that the theory has evolved over the years to include different levels of agenda-setting. The first level focuses more on transparency of the issue, as mentioned previously. The second level of agenda-setting focuses more on the framing or attributes of the issue at hand. Agenda-setting effects are extremely influential in environments where people have a limited experience, this increasing reliance on information that is mediated. As a result, the agenda-setting theory is a key part in the central framework when looking at the relationship between public opinion and mass media.

Even though digital media continues to see record-breaking usage, studies show that most Americans still prefer to receive their news from the television. Around 5 decades ago, all Americans were getting their news from network television, thanks to the discovery of cable in the 1980s. Back then, there was only three real stations that people tuned into: ABC, NBC, and CBS. In total, these three channels saw around 80 million consumers. Back when these three channels were the main sources of news for Americans via television, there was much less bias in their reporting. Additionally, 24 hour news had recently came to fruition so Americans had no need to seek their news elsewhere. Television news has gone through many transformations as the years progressed as technology, media economics, and audience behavior have shifted across the country. In today's day in age, many news networks have become extremely polarized; usually tailoring to either Republicans or Democrats. It has become increasingly difficult to find news that remains neutral and accurate at the same time, which then leads to a massive distrust in media outlets and organizations. Terms like "fake news" continue to divide Americans. Today, it is hard to tell whether or not a news source is reliable or not, meaning that Americans usually have to look at several news articles and sift through the lies to determine what is accurate and not.

Recent studies have looked into how news media shape the public's understanding of major social policies that make up the United States' "social safety net". This includes topics like health insurance, welfare programs, paid leave, housing, food assistance, and early childhood care. In 2025, a review was conducted using forty different studies published between 1990 and 2022. This review found that U.S. news coverage often emphasized individual stories and political dynamics instead of systemic context of social issues and structural causes. The primary focus on this review was "episodic framing" and how it may influence the publics' perceptions by reinforcing stereotypes about recipients and limiting attention to much more broader policy implications. Additionally, studies also show some variation in framing, depending on political context and media type, with television and print outlets often framing topics like health insurance and welfare debates in terms of partisan conflict instead of substantive policy details. Although some coverage during events like the COVID-19 pandemic in 2020 shifted toward reducing stigmatized language and explaining program benefits, the literature overall suggests that journalists rarely integrate discussions of social determinants of health and health equity into coverage of safety-net policy. Researchers have suggested that greater inclusion of structural context and expert sources could potentially improve public discourse on social supports and its implications for the well-being of the population.

=== Agenda-setting in domestic politics ===
In a commercialized media context, the media can often not afford to ignore an important issue which another television station, newspaper, or radio station is willing to pick up. The news media may be able to create new issues by reporting or they can obscure issues through negligence and distraction. For example, if neighborhoods are affected by high crime rates, or unemployment, journalists may not spend sufficient time reporting on potential solutions, or on systemic causes such as corruption and social exclusion, or on other related issues. They can reduce the direct awareness of the public of these problems. In some cases, the public can choose another news source, so it is in a news organization's commercial interest to try to find an agenda which corresponds as closely as possible to peoples' desires. They may not be entirely successful, but the agenda-setting potential of the media is considerably limited by the competition for viewers' interest, readers and listeners.

Different US news media sources tend to identify the same major stories in domestic politics, which may imply that the media are prioritizing issues according to a shared set of criteria.

=== Agenda-setting in foreign policy ===
One way in which the media could set the agenda is if it is in an area in which very few Americans have direct experience of the issues. This applies to foreign policy. When American military personnel are involved, the media needs to report because the personnel are related to the American public. The media is also likely to have an interest in reporting issues with major direct effects on American workers, such as major trade agreements with Mexico. In other cases, it is difficult to see how the media can be prevented from setting the foreign policy agenda.

McKay lists as one of the three main distortions of information by the media "Placing high priority on American news to the detriment of foreign news. And when the US is engaged in military action abroad, this 'foreign news' crowds out other foreign news".

=== Horse race approach to political campaign coverage ===
American news media are more obsessed than ever with the horse-race aspects of the presidential campaign, according to a 2007 study. Coverage of the political campaigns have been less reflective on the issues that matter to voters, and instead have primarily focused on campaign tactics and strategy, according to a report conducted jointly by the Project for Excellence in Journalism, part of the Pew Research Center, and the Joan Shorenstein Center on the Press, Politics and Public Policy at the Kennedy School of Harvard University, which examined 1,742 stories that appeared from January through May 2007 in 48 news outlets. Almost two-thirds of all stories in American news media, including print, television, radio and online, focused on the political aspects of the campaign, while only one percent focused on the candidates' public records. Only 12 percent of stories seemed relevant to voters' decision-making; the rest were more about tactics and strategy.

The proportion of horse-race stories has gotten worse over time. Horse-race coverage has accounted for 63 percent of reports this year (2007) compared with what the study said was about 55 percent in 2000 and 2004. "If American politics is changing," the study concluded, "the style and approach of the American press do not appear to be changing with it".

The study found that the American news media deprive the American public of what Americans say they want: voters are eager to know more about the candidates' positions on issues and their personal backgrounds, more about lesser-known candidates and more about debates. Commentators have pointed out that when covering election campaigns news media often emphasize trivial facts about the candidates but more rarely provide the candidates' specific public stances on issues that matter to voters.

The same approach can also apply to issue politics. Kathleen Hall Jamieson, director of the Annenberg Public Policy Center coined the term "tactical framing" to describe news coverage that focuses on the question of how a policy proposal will affect the next election, rather than whether or not it is a good idea. Jamieson cites coverage of the Green New Deal as an example. Research by Jameson has found the presence of tactically framed stories can make voters more cynical and less likely to remember substantive information.

== See also ==
- All-news radio § United States
- Mainstream media
- Media bias in the United States
- Media of the United States
- Weather media in the United States
