= WDXE (AM) =

- Lawrenceburg, Tennessee; United States
- Broadcast area: Lawrence County
- Frequency: 1370 kHz
- Branding: 95.3 & 105.3 & 1370 WDXE

Programming
- Format: Talk radio
- Affiliations: Fox News Radio; Westwood One

Ownership
- Owner: Roger Wright; (Radio 7 Media, LLC)
- Sister stations: WKSR, WLLX, WLXA, WWLX

History
- First air date: July 21, 1951
- Call sign meaning: Dixie Network, former owner

Technical information
- Licensing authority: FCC
- Facility ID: 27241
- Class: D
- Power: 1,000 watts (day); 25 watts (night)
- Transmitter coordinates: 35.256944°N 87.306667°W
- Translators: 95.3 W237FD (Lawrenceburg); 105.3 W287AA (Lawrenceburg)

Links
- Public license information: Public file; LMS
- Webcast: Listen live
- Website: radio7media.com/wdxe

WDXE (1370 FM) is a commercial radio station licensed to Lawrenceburg, Tennessee, United States, and serving Lawrence County. WDXE is owned by Roger Wright, through licensee Radio 7 Media, LLC, and features a talk radio format.

Former logo

== Translators ==
WDXE's programming is also carried on two broadcast translator stations to extend or improve the coverage area of the station.

Broadcast translators for WDXE
Call sign	Frequency	City of license	FID	ERP (W)	Class	FCC info
W237FD	95.3 FM	Lawrenceburg, TN	200434	250	D	LMS
W287AA	105.3 FM	Lawrenceburg, TN	58445	250	D	LMS
