= Homeland Harmony Quartet =

The Homeland Harmony Quartet was an American gospel group founded in 1935.

The original lineup of the quartet was Otis Leon McCoy, Doyle Blackwood, Fred Calvin Maples, and B.C. Robinson. The group had lasting ties to the Church of God and went through more than fifty line-up changes in a career that spanned thirty years.

In 1943, tenor Connor Brandon Hall joined the quartet. He would remain with the group until his death in 1992. Other notables to sing with the group include basses Big Jim Waits and Johnny Atkinson, Lee Roy Abernathy and baritone James McCoy. The line-up of Hall, Abernathy, J. McCoy, Shorty Bradford, and A.D.Soward that formed in 1947 is widely considered to have been a seminal influence on both pop and further gospel musical stylings.

== Personnel ==
Tenor

- Connor Hall (1942-1989)

Lead

- Otis McCoy (1942-1944)
- Shorty Bradford (1946-1948, 1953-1954)
- Paul Stringfellow (1948-1950)
- Bobby Shaw (1950-1952, 1987-1989)
- Wayne Groce (1952-1953)
- Harold Lane (1954-1955)
- Jim Cole (1955-1956)
- Tommy Rainer (1956-1957)
- Fred Elrod (1957-1958, 1963-1987)

Baritone

- James McCoy (1942-1958)
- Jimi Hall (1963-1969)
- JL Steele (1969-1986)

Bass

- B.C. Robinson (1942-1943)
- Big Jim Waits (1943-1944, 1949-1952)
- John Hamrick (1946-1947)
- Aycel Soward (1947-1949, 1953–54, 1955)
- Johnny Atkinson (1952-1953)
- London Parris (1954)
- George Younce (1955)
- Rex Nelon (1955-1958)
- Bill Curtis (1963-1989)

Piano

- Hovie Lister (1942-1944)
- Lee Roy Abernathy (1946-1948, 1953-1954)
- Reece Crockett (1948-1949)
- Wally Varner (1949-1950, 1951-1953)
- Doy Ott (1950-1951)
- Randy Jones (1954-1955)
- Jack Clark (1955-1956, 1969-1989)
- Livey Freeman (1958) according to Rex Nelon
