= Lawrenceburg, Tennessee =

- City
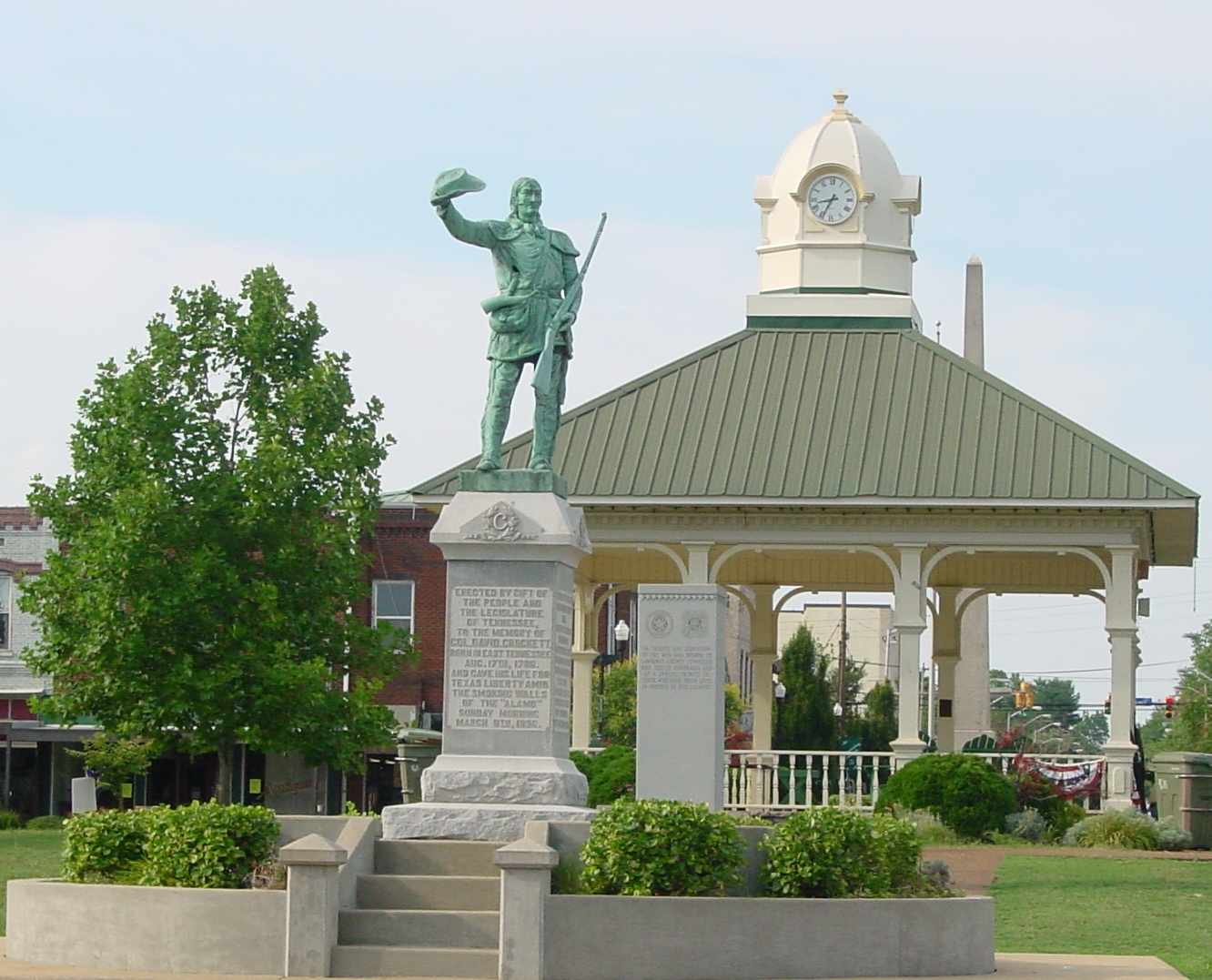
- Town square in Lawrenceburg with a statue of David Crockett in the center.
- Motto: "Where Tradition Meets Progress"
- Location of Lawrenceburg in Lawrence County, Tennessee.
- Coordinates: 35°14′37″N 87°20′4″W
- Country: United States
- State: Tennessee
- County: Lawrence
- Founded: 1819
- Incorporated: 1825
- Named for: James Lawrence

Government
  - Type: Mayor/Council/Administrator
  - Mayor: Blake Lay
  - City Administrator: Dick McKinley
  - Chief of Police: Terry Beecham
  - City Council: Council Members: Darryl Watson; Chad Moore; Jamie Sevier; Robin Williams

Area
  - Total: 12.66 sq mi (32.80 km^{2})
  - Land: 12.66 sq mi (32.80 km^{2})
  - Water: 0 sq mi (0.00 km^{2})
- Elevation: 896 ft (273 m)

Population (2020)
  - Total: 11,633
  - Density: 918.5/sq mi (354.64/km^{2})
- Time zone: UTC-6 (Central (CST))
  - Summer (DST): UTC-5 (CDT)
- ZIP code: 38464
- Area code: 931
- FIPS code: 47-41340
- GNIS feature ID: 1290790
- Website: www.lawrenceburgtn.gov

Lawrenceburg is a city in and the county seat of Lawrence County, Tennessee, United States. The largest city on the state's southern border between Chattanooga and Memphis, it lies on the banks of Shoal Creek. The population was 11,633 at the 2020 United States Census. The city is named after War of 1812 American Navy officer James Lawrence.

Located around 80 miles (130 km) southwest of Nashville at the junction of U.S. Routes 43 and 64, Lawrenceburg is called the "Crossroads of Dixie."

== History ==
According to a recent theory, the Lawrenceburg area is the likely site of "Chicasa"—the place where Spanish explorer Hernando de Soto and his men wintered in 1540–41 (though earlier theories have suggested this campsite to have been in northern Mississippi). The Chickasaw Nation sold the area to the US in 1816.

Upon moving from East Tennessee into the region around 1817, David Crockett served as a justice of the peace, a colonel of the militia, and a state representative. David Crockett established a powder mill on Shoal Creek originally called the Sycamore River. This area is now home to David Crockett State Park. Crockett was elected as a commissioner and served on the board that placed Lawrenceburg four miles (6.4 km) west of the geographic center of Lawrence County. Crockett was opposed to the city being located in its current location, largely out of fear of flooding. He and his family lived in Lawrenceburg for several years before moving to West Tennessee after a flood destroyed his mill.

After World War II, the Murray Ohio Manufacturing Company, a U.S. producer of bicycles and outdoor equipment, moved its manufacturing operations to Lawrenceburg, building a new factory and assembly plant. Over the next several decades, the Murray factory grew to be one of the largest in the United States: 42.7 acres (173,000 m^{2}) under roof.

During the April 16 1998 tornado outbreak. At 4:30 P.M a large F5 tornado struck Northwest of Lawrenceburg, causing no fatalities but caused 21 injuries.

A flood struck Lawrenceburg in July 1998, killing two people on Shoal Creek.

Following the flood, the city undertook a 10-year flood control project that dramatically reduced risk for major flooding that had plagued the town since the days of Davy Crockett.

== Geography ==
Lawrenceburg is located at 35°14′37″N 87°20′4″W (35.243491, −87.334563).

The city of Lawrenceburg has a total area of 12.6 square miles (33 km^{2}). It is the largest city on the state line between Chattanooga and Memphis. Located on the southern Highland Rim, Lawrence County and Lawrenceburg are set atop of a large mountain plateau of the Appalachian Mountain range with elevations ranging between 810 feet (250 m) to over 1,120 feet (340 m). Map of the Appalachian Mountain Range.

=== Climate ===
Climate data for Lawrenceburg, Tennessee (1991–2020 normals, extremes 1954–present)
Month	Jan	Feb	Mar	Apr	May	Jun	Jul	Aug	Sep	Oct	Nov	Dec	Year
Record high °F (°C)	76 (24)	81 (27)	85 (29)	89 (32)	94 (34)	106 (41)	103 (39)	104 (40)	99 (37)	96 (36)	90 (32)	75 (24)	106 (41)
Mean maximum °F (°C)	67.3 (19.6)	71.7 (22.1)	78.1 (25.6)	83.8 (28.8)	87.7 (30.9)	92.8 (33.8)	95.1 (35.1)	94.5 (34.7)	91.9 (33.3)	84.8 (29.3)	76.2 (24.6)	67.9 (19.9)	96.5 (35.8)
Mean daily maximum °F (°C)	48.6 (9.2)	53.4 (11.9)	61.7 (16.5)	71.2 (21.8)	78.1 (25.6)	85.0 (29.4)	88.0 (31.1)	87.6 (30.9)	82.6 (28.1)	72.5 (22.5)	60.5 (15.8)	51.3 (10.7)	70.0 (21.1)
Daily mean °F (°C)	38.3 (3.5)	42.2 (5.7)	49.8 (9.9)	58.7 (14.8)	66.8 (19.3)	74.4 (23.6)	77.7 (25.4)	76.7 (24.8)	70.7 (21.5)	60.0 (15.6)	48.7 (9.3)	41.3 (5.2)	58.8 (14.9)
Mean daily minimum °F (°C)	28.0 (−2.2)	31.0 (−0.6)	38.0 (3.3)	46.3 (7.9)	55.6 (13.1)	63.7 (17.6)	67.5 (19.7)	65.8 (18.8)	58.7 (14.8)	47.4 (8.6)	37.0 (2.8)	31.3 (−0.4)	47.5 (8.6)
Mean minimum °F (°C)	8.5 (−13.1)	13.8 (−10.1)	21.2 (−6.0)	29.1 (−1.6)	40.5 (4.7)	50.6 (10.3)	57.5 (14.2)	55.2 (12.9)	42.7 (5.9)	30.8 (−0.7)	21.7 (−5.7)	12.6 (−10.8)	4.0 (−15.6)
Record low °F (°C)	−14 (−26)	−12 (−24)	4 (−16)	22 (−6)	30 (−1)	36 (2)	47 (8)	44 (7)	31 (−1)	19 (−7)	8 (−13)	−10 (−23)	−14 (−26)
Average precipitation inches (mm)	5.33 (135)	5.23 (133)	5.37 (136)	4.89 (124)	6.08 (154)	4.34 (110)	5.19 (132)	3.83 (97)	4.32 (110)	3.70 (94)	5.37 (136)	6.21 (158)	59.86 (1,519)
Average snowfall inches (cm)	1.4 (3.6)	1.6 (4.1)	0.3 (0.76)	trace	0.0 (0.0)	0.0 (0.0)	0.0 (0.0)	0.0 (0.0)	0.0 (0.0)	0.0 (0.0)	0.0 (0.0)	0.7 (1.8)	4.0 (10)
Average precipitation days (≥ 0.01 in)	8.4	8.4	9.5	9.1	9.5	9.2	8.7	7.0	6.5	6.2	8.0	9.4	99.9
Average snowy days (≥ 0.1 in)	0.6	0.8	0.2	0.0	0.0	0.0	0.0	0.0	0.0	0.0	0.0	0.5	2.1
Source: NOAA (precip/precip days, snow/snow days 1981–2010)

== Demographics ==
Historical population
Census	Pop.	Note	%±
1870	351		—
1880	503		43.3%
1890	618		22.9%
1900	823		33.2%
1910	1,687		105.0%
1920	2,461		45.9%
1930	3,102		26.0%
1940	3,807		22.7%
1950	5,442		42.9%
1960	8,042		47.8%
1970	8,889		10.5%
1980	10,184		14.6%
1990	10,412		2.2%
2000	10,796		3.7%
2010	10,428		−3.4%
2020	11,633		11.6%

=== 2020 census ===
As of the 2020 census, Lawrenceburg had a population of 11,633. The median age was 38.4 years, 23.2% of residents were under the age of 18, and 20.1% of residents were 65 years of age or older. For every 100 females there were 88.1 males, and for every 100 females age 18 and over there were 83.0 males age 18 and over.

94.2% of residents lived in urban areas, while 5.8% lived in rural areas.

There were 4,836 households in Lawrenceburg, of which 29.8% had children under the age of 18 living in them. Of all households, 35.6% were married-couple households, 19.2% were households with a male householder and no spouse or partner present, and 38.3% were households with a female householder and no spouse or partner present. About 35.9% of all households were made up of individuals and 16.7% had someone living alone who was 65 years of age or older.

There were 5,221 housing units, of which 7.4% were vacant. The homeowner vacancy rate was 1.4% and the rental vacancy rate was 6.3%.

Racial composition as of the 2020 census
Race	Number	Percent
White	9,925	85.3%
Black or African American	484	4.2%
American Indian and Alaska Native	33	0.3%
Asian	94	0.8%
Native Hawaiian and Other Pacific Islander	0	0.0%
Some other race	248	2.1%
Two or more races	849	7.3%
Hispanic or Latino (of any race)	572	4.9%

=== 2010 census ===
As of the census of 2010, there were 10,428 people living in the city. The population density was 857.6 inhabitants per square mile (331.1/km^{2}). There were 5,166 housing units at an average density of 410.4 units per square mile (158.5 units/km^{2}). The racial makeup of the city was 94% White, 2.6% Black or African American, 0.3% American Indian and Alaska Native, 0.4% Asian, 0.0% Native Hawaiian and Other Pacific Islander, 0.6% from Some Other Race, and 2.1% from Two or More Races. Hispanic or Latino people represented 2% of the population.

There were 4,579 households, out of which 24.8% had children under the age of 18 living with them, 39% were a husband-wife family living together, 15% had a female householder with no husband present, 4.8% had a male householder with no wife present, and 41.1% were nonfamily households. 36.4% of nonfamily households were made up of a householder living alone, and 18.1% of nonfamily households consisted of a person living alone who was 65 years of age or older. The average household size was 2.23, and the average family size was 2.89.

The median age of a person in Lawrenceburg during the 2010 United States census was 40.8 years. The population was 53.4% female and 46.6% male.

The median income for a household in the city was $36,286, and the median income for a family was $47,143. Median earnings for male full-time, year-round workers was $34,960 versus $26,188 for female full-time, year-round workers. The per capita income for the city was $20,587. About 12.6% of families and 18.8% of the population were below the poverty line, including 28.5% of those under age 18 and 13.9% of those age 65 or over.

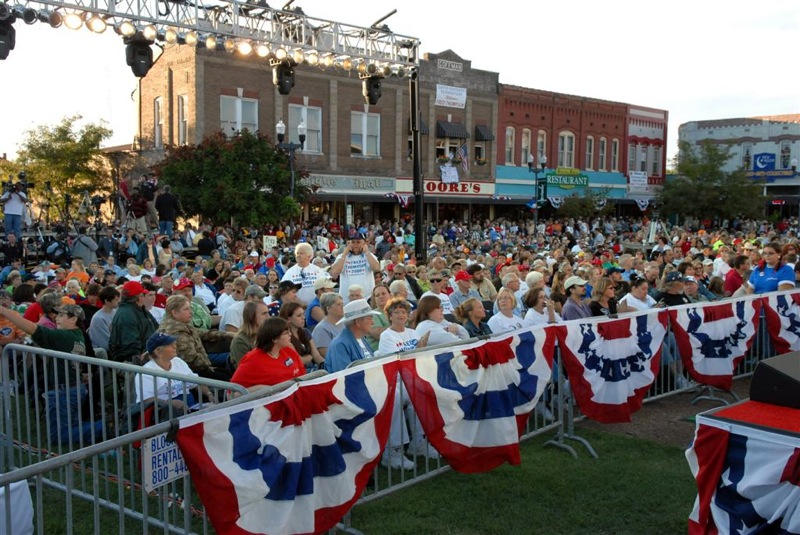
Fred Thompson Rally in Lawrenceburg, 2008

== Culture ==
Tourist attractions include David Crockett State Park.

== Education ==
The city of Lawrenceburg is served by the Lawrence County School System. There are four public elementary schools, one public middle school, and one public high school, as well as three private schools within the city's borders. Lawrenceburg is home to a satellite campus of Columbia State Community College and the Southern Tennessee Higher Education Center. The local school district also operates an adult secondary educational facility and a virtual school for K-12 students.

== Radio broadcasting ==
- WDXE "AM 1370 FM 105.3 The Legend WDXE"
- WLFM "K-Love"
- WLLX "The TN Valley's Superstation 97.5 / 98.3 WLX"

== Television broadcasting ==
- Tennessee Valley Weather

== Notable people ==
- Davy Crockett for a time called Lawrenceburg home. Many landmarks and businesses now include Crockett in their names. David Crockett State Park on the western edge of the city and the David Crockett Monument located on the city square are two spots that pay homage to the legendary outdoorsman.
- Michael Jeter (1952–2003), Tony Award-winning actor for Grand Hotel, also had a memorable film role in The Green Mile, played Mister Noodle on Sesame Street; born in Lawrenceburg.
- James Daniel Niedergeses, bishop of the Roman Catholic Diocese of Nashville
- Adger M. Pace (1882–1959), Southern gospel hymn writer
- Ingram C. Sowell (1892–1947), rear admiral, US Navy, and recipient of the Navy Cross
- Fred Dalton Thompson (1942–2015), lawyer, U.S. senator, actor, and Law & Order cast-member; sought the GOP nomination for president in the 2008 campaign
- James David Vaughan, credited as the father of Southern gospel music and founder of the Vaughan Publishing Company in downtown Lawrenceburg
- William Burton Walbert (1886–1959), Southern gospel singer-songwriter
- David Weathers, former pitcher for the Cincinnati Reds; father of Ryan Weathers
- Ryan Weathers, professional baseball pitcher in the San Diego Padres organization
