= WLXA =

Radio station in Loretto, Tennessee

- Florence, Alabama; United States
- Frequency: 98.3 MHz (HD Radio)
- Branding: 97.5 - 98.3 WLX

Programming
- Format: Country (WLLX simulcast)
- Subchannels: HD2: Classic hits (WKSR simulcast)

Ownership
- Owner: Roger Wright; (Radio 7 Media, LLC)
- Sister stations: WDXE, WKSR, WLLX, WWLX

History
- First air date: 1970 (as WMGL)
- Former call signs: WMGL (1970–1986); WINJ (1986–1995); WKSR-FM (1995–2014); WDXE-FM (2014–2016)

Technical information
- Licensing authority: FCC
- Facility ID: 53875
- Class: C3
- ERP: 17,500 watts 25,000 watts (Application)
- HAAT: 119 meters (390 ft); 86 meters (282 ft) (Application)
- Transmitter coordinates: 34°57′55.3″N 87°30′0.1″W; 34°45′24.3″N 87°40′44.1″W (Application)
- Translator: 103.5 W278CH (Muscle Shoals, Alabama)

Links
- Public license information: Public file; LMS
- Webcast: Listen Live
- Website: WLXA Online

WLXA (98.3 FM) is a radio station broadcasting a country music format, simulcasting WLLX 97.5 FM Lawrenceburg, TN. Licensed to Florence, Alabama, United States, the station is currently owned by Roger Wright through licensee Radio 7 Media, LLC, and features programming from Westwood One.

== Sports ==
Starting in 2021, WLX became the radio broadcast partner for the North Alabama Lions. North Alabama football and basketball games are broadcast on the 98.3 and the 103.5 frequencies.

== Previous logos ==
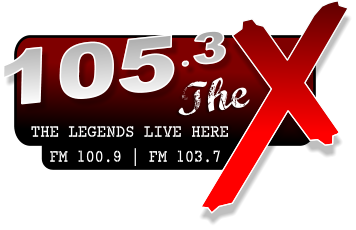
