= Weather media in the United States =

In the United States, weather and weather forecasting are covered by farmers' almanacs, newspapers, radio, television stations, and the internet. Farmers' Almanacs have taken a stab at forecasting for the following year or so for around two centuries. At first, weather media included reporting on past events, with forecasting playing a role from the late 19th century onward. Weather-related information proliferated to near real-time after the invention of the telegraph. Radio and satellite broadcasts made weather-related communication ever quicker, with the World Wide Web making broadcasting and reporting nearly instantaneous.

By the 1990s, sensationalism played a role in large weather coverage. Hyping weather, especially winter weather, has become a major marketing tool in media. It is common for media in the United States to hype cold temperatures that are just a few degrees colder than normal for any region. Hyping cold in the resort and sunbelt areas of the United States is also common, with the media flying in reporters to cover the weather in Florida or southern California when temperatures below 32°F (0°C) are expected.

== Farmers' almanacs ==
Farmers' Almanacs have published long-term forecasts for around 200 years. While almanac publishers have attributed an 80 to 85 percent accuracy rate to the publication's annual forecasts, independent studies that retrospectively compare the weather with the predictions have not shown them more accurate than chance. Predictions for each edition are made as far as two years in advance. The Farmers’ Almanac publishers are highly secretive about the method used to make its predictions, only stating publicly that it is a "top secret mathematical and astronomical formula, that relies on sunspot activity, tidal action, planetary position and many other factors." (The use of planetary position or astrology to forecast weather dates back to Ptolemy's work in the second century of the Common Era, and it was thus an outgrowth of the almanacs' other main purpose to provide the positions of celestial bodies. Like other forms of astrology, the scientific community considers it a discredited pseudoscience.)

== Newspapers ==
An example of a two-day weather forecast in the visual style that an American newspaper might use. Temperatures are given in Fahrenheit.

Newspapers, early in their history, reported on current and past weather events. Prior to the telegraph, distant weather reports travelled around 100 miles per day (160 km/d), though it was more typically 40–75 miles per day (60–120 km/day) (whether by land or by sea). By the late 1840s, the telegraph allowed reports of weather conditions from a wide area to be received almost instantaneously, allowing forecasts to be made from knowledge of weather conditions further upwind. This led to United States government involvement in the weather enterprise.

The 1876 Centennial Exposition in Philadelphia, Pennsylvania demonstrated that daily weather map transmission via telegraph could be accomplished. The New York Daily Graphic published weather maps from mid-1879 through the summer of 1882. By 1894, there were four daily newspapers publishing weather maps in Boston, New Orleans, Cincinnati, and San Francisco. An increasing amount of newspapers published weather maps over the following years, before the fad passed in 1912. While the number of newspapers carrying weather maps decreased beyond 1912, many continued publishing them until interest in flight increased interest in the maps once more in the 1930s.

== Radio and radiofax ==
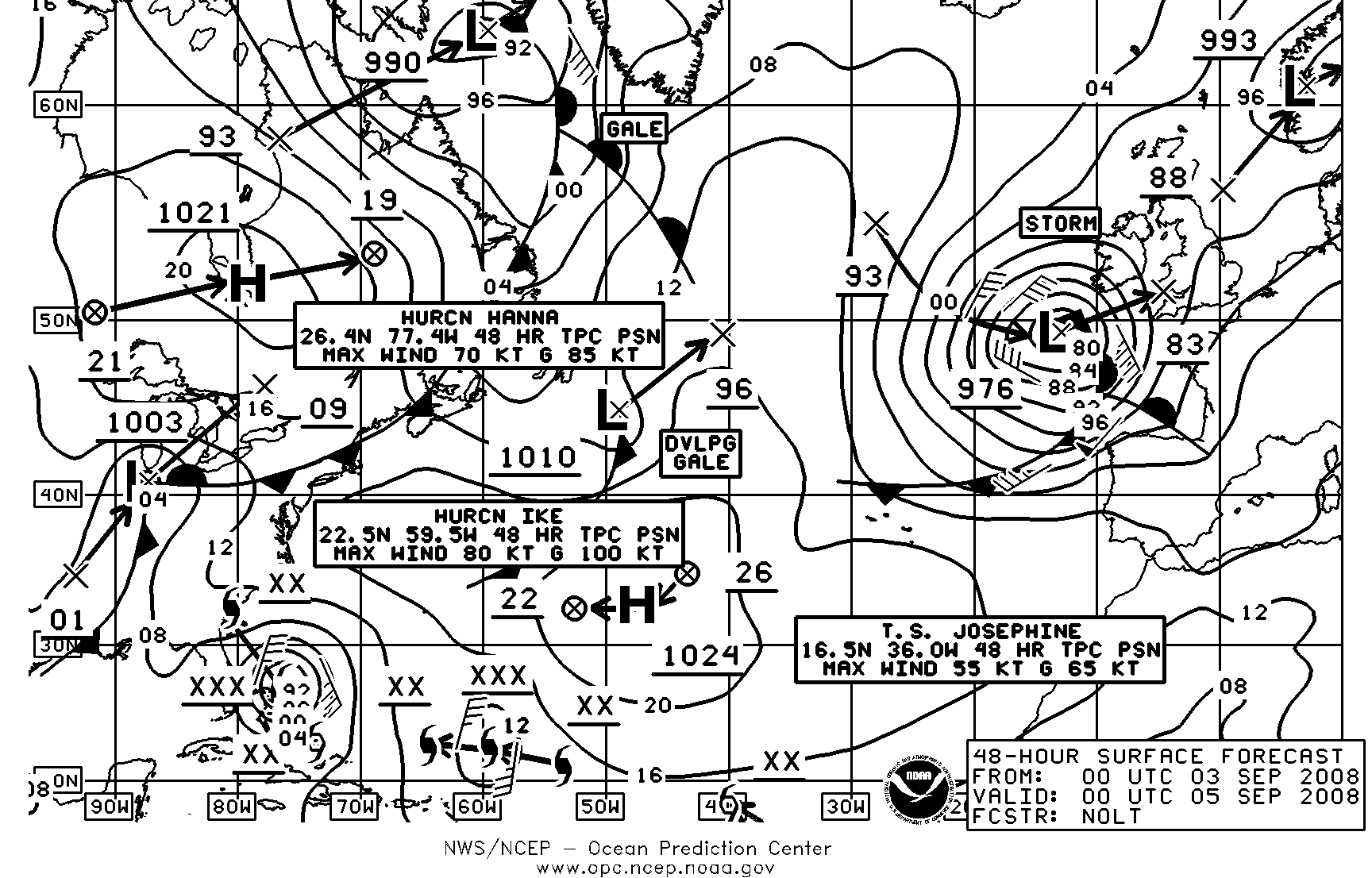
OPC pressure forecast valid at 48 hours, an example of a radiofax chart

In 1922 the Navy provided radio broadcasts of North Atlantic coastal conditions twice daily. After early agricultural and daily weather information radio broadcasts by the University of North Dakota (1914) and the University of Wisconsin (1921), by 1925 the Department of Agriculture was broadcasting a daily weather forecast nationwide. Beginning in 1930, radiofax broadcasts of weather information and forecasts were broadcast for use by ships at sea, emanating from the United States military and the National Weather Service on a cooperative basis. Starting in 1935, Weather Bureau/National Weather Service weather maps were published in newspapers via the Associated Press in a slightly processed format as Wirephoto weather maps.

By the mid 20th century, radio and television led to the next revolution in weather coverage. NOAA Weather Radio broadcasts began within the United States Weather Bureau in the 1950s, and expanded significantly during the 1970s, providing a more direct line of weather information from the government to the public. In 1975, NOAA Weather Radio was designated the sole government-operated radio system used to convey weather watches, warnings, and warning of nuclear attack. Local radio stations, particularly those that focus on the news, report on current weather conditions and the expected forecast and can act as the main source of information during power outages.

== Television ==
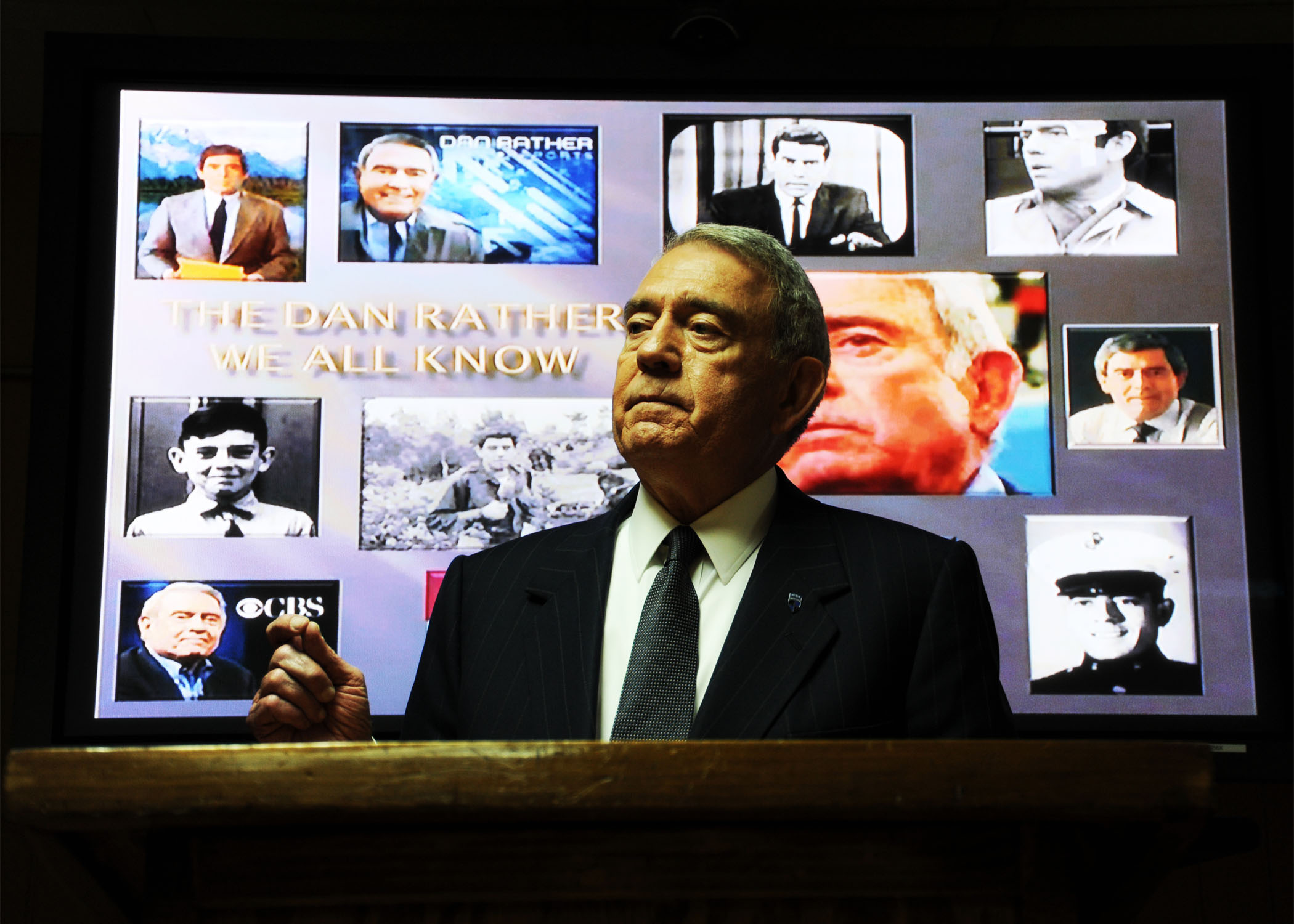
Dan Rather speaking about his experiences in his 61 years of journalism before a group of NATO commanders at Camp Eggers in Kabul, Afghanistan in July 2011

On television, weather segments are included within local and national news coverage. Dan Rather In early September 1961 reported live from the Galveston Seawall as Hurricane Carla threatened the Texas coastline. He took a camera crew to the U.S. Weather Bureau (National Weather Service) office with a WSR-57 radar console located on the 5th floor of the Post Office Building on 25th Street in downtown Galveston. A meteorologist drew for him a rough outline of the Gulf of Mexico on a sheet of plastic, and held that over the radar display of Carla to give Rather's audience an idea of the Carla's size, and the position of the hurricane's eye. Rather's reporting was the first ever display of a meteorological surveillance radar on television, and has been imitated by more recent reporters.

Weather-centered programming began in the 1970s, with the advent of the PBS-broadcast Aviation Weather (1972–1976), A.M. Weather (1978–1995) and NWS-broadcast Alaskan weather (1976–present) broadcasts, with programs staffed by Federal Aviation Administration and National Weather Service employees. After the development of cable television, the first weather-centered network, the Atlanta, Georgia-based The Weather Channel, went on the air in 1982. The Weather Channel, owned by NBC, Bain Capital, and The Blackstone Group since 2008, moved from all weather-centered coverage to a mix of weather coverage and documentary/entertainment based programming arena during the 2000s.

Other weather-centered television networks were created as competition to The Weather Channel, such as NBC's Weather Plus (2004–2008), WeatherNation (2010–current) and Fox Weather (2021–current), which came into being during the first decade of the 21st century. Other proposed television networks from the Pennsylvania-based AccuWeather company and Atlanta-based NetworkWeather were slated to come into existence during mid to late 2014.

== Internet ==
Internet-based weather information began experimentally with the Viewtron television service in the mid-1980s, and later on through gopher and World Wide Web sites in the 1990s. The National Weather Service formed a direct line of communication with the public through the internet in 1995, with the establishment of internet websites from each local forecast office, river forecast offices, and the various offices within the National Centers for Environmental Prediction. By the 2000s, when internet coverage expanded to cell phone usage and automobiles, various applications allowed users to get information graphically while on the go. Many local and national television stations which are either weather-centered in their programming or contain weather segments, stream their programming online onto the World Wide Web. National weather-centered television networks such as The Weather Channel and WeatherNation stream their content online.

== Sensationalism and hype ==
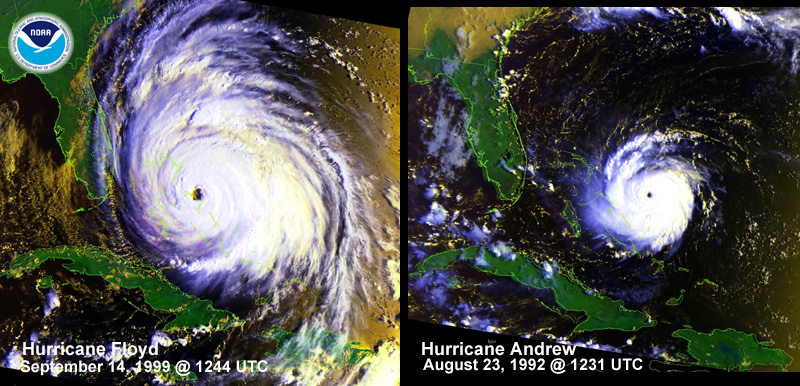
Satellite images of Hurricane Floyd led to a mass public evacuation of Florida, seven years after Hurricane Andrew. This image is a visual comparison of Hurricanes Floyd and Andrew while at similar positions and nearly identical intensities

In 1954 and 1955, hurricane-related news cracked the top ten news items of the year, due to the busy hurricane seasons along the East coast. As nightly network news broadcasts featured weather-related items more prominently within their newscasts – from outside the top 10 news items in the late 1980s and early 1990s to the fourth most-covered item by 1998 – concerns were raised concerning media hype and sensationalism in 2000. Those involved in the discussion agreed on the need to work in a more coordinated manner between the media, government weather organizations, and emergency managers. A series of tropical cyclone-related events in the state of Florida, with the media showing bumper-to-bumper traffic, empty store shelves, and unofficial evacuation announcements, led to public confusion and an overloading of emergency responders located away from the location of significant impact. Reporters made independent extrapolations based on disparate reports to guess when local bridges would close. A concentration on the current strength of Hurricane Floyd, rather than its expected track and weakening farther up the coastline, led to mass evacuations within Florida which were unnecessary. Attempts to correct misperceptions amongst local media went nowhere, as reporters had left the scene, looking for areas of more significant impact.

== Sources of hurricane information ==
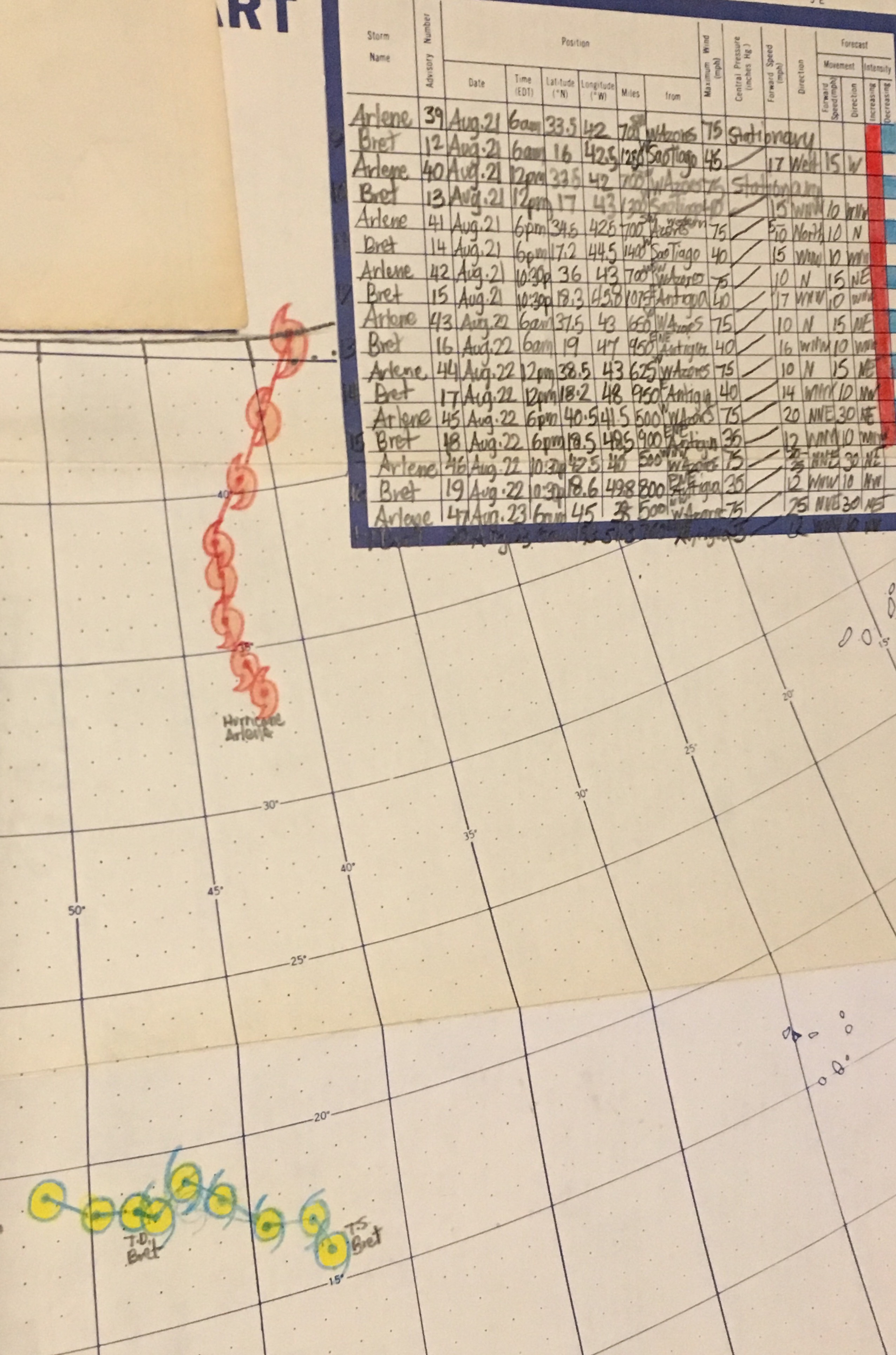
Chart with concurrent information for Hurricane Arlene and Tropical Storm Bret logged and plotted

In order to use hurricane tracking charts, one needs access to latitude/longitude pairs and maximum sustained wind information in order to know which symbol to depict. New tropical cyclone information is available at least every six hours in the Northern Hemisphere from the National Hurricane Center. In decades past, newspaper, television, and radio (including weather radio) were the sources for this information. In the late 1970s, specialized programs such as A.M. Weather allowed people to tune at a specific time in the morning to get tropical cyclone-related information for the northeast Pacific and north Atlantic basins. The advent of NOAA Weather Radio in the 1950s, which expanded during the 1970s in the wake of Hurricane Camille, by the National Weather Service allowed those with receivers that had access to the "weather bands" to listen in for tropical cyclone advisories in coastal/near coastal areas.

Local television stations within threatened markets would advertise tropical cyclone positions within the morning, evening, and nightly news during their weather segments every half hour. In the early 1980s, The Weather Channel would have tropical updates at 25 minutes after the hour each hour with this information. When hurricanes were closer to the coast, updates would occur at 25 and 52 minutes past the hour. By the 1990s, the updates became 50 minutes after the hour on a permanent basis. Starting in the mid-1990s, the World Wide Web allowed for the development of ftp and web sites by the National Hurricane Center which allowed the end user to get their information from their official products.
