= WKSR (AM) =

Radio station in Tennessee, United States

- Pulaski, Tennessee; United States
- Frequency: 1420 kHz
- Branding: Classic KSR - WKSR FM 100.9 FM 107.7 AM 1420

Programming
- Format: Classic hits

Ownership
- Owner: Morgan Hoover; (Richland Broadcasting Company)

History
- First air date: 1947

Technical information
- Licensing authority: FCC
- Facility ID: 53874
- Class: D
- Power: 1,000 watts day 60 watts night
- Transmitter coordinates: 35°12′1″N 87°4′30″W
- Translators: 100.9 W265AQ (Pulaski); 107.7 W299CW (Pulaski)
- Repeater: 98.3-2 WLXA-HD2 (Florence)

Links
- Public license information: Public file; LMS
- Webcast: Listen Live
- Website: wksr.com

WKSR (1420 kHz) is an AM radio station broadcasting a classic hits format. Licensed to Pulaski, Tennessee, United States, the station is currently owned by Morgan Hoover through Richland Broadcasting Company.

The Rocky 1420 branding was replaced by Oldies 1420 KSR as of spring 2010. On March 1, 2018, the station switched from a country music format to classic hits and adopted the branding "Classic KSR".

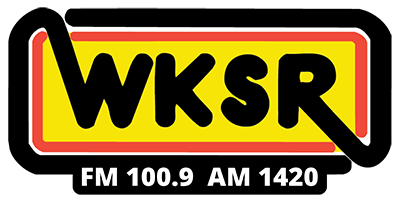
Logo before 107.7 translator sign on
