= Southern gospel =

Subgenre of gospel music

- Stylistic origins: Sacred Harp music; shape note singing; hymns; spirituals; high church music
- Cultural origins: Late 19th century, southeastern US evangelicals

Subgenres
- Bluegrass gospel; country gospel

Fusion genres
- Contemporary Christian music

Other topics
- Gospel Music Association; Christian music; National Gospel Singing Convention; Southern Gospel Museum and Hall of Fame

Southern gospel music is a genre of Christian music. Its name comes from its origins in the southeastern United States. Because it grew out of the musical traditions of white musicians from the American South, the name is used to differentiate it from the black gospel tradition.

Its lyrics are written to express either personal or a communal faith regarding biblical teachings and Christian life, as well as (in terms of the varying music styles) to give a Christian alternative to mainstream secular music. Sometimes known as quartet music for its traditional "four men and a piano" set up, southern gospel has evolved over the years into a popular form of music across the United States and overseas, especially among baby boomers and those living in the Southern United States.

Like other forms of music, the creation, performance, significance, and even the definition of southern gospel varies according to the cultural and social context. It is composed and performed for many purposes, ranging from aesthetic pleasure, religious or ceremonial purposes, or as an entertainment product for the marketplace.

== Origins ==
The date of southern gospel's establishment, as a distinct genre, is generally considered to be 1910, the year the first professional quartet was formed for the purpose of selling songbooks for the James D. Vaughan Music Publishing Company in Lawrenceburg, Tennessee. Nonetheless, the style of the music itself had existed for at least 35 years prior—although the traditional wisdom that southern gospel was "invented" in the 1870s by circuit preacher Everett Beverly is spurious.

The existence of the genre prior to 1910 is evident in the work of Charles Davis Tillman (1861–1943), who popularized "The Old Time Religion", wrote "Life's Railway to Heaven" and published 22 songbooks. Some of the genre's roots can be found in the publishing work and "normal schools" or singing schools of Aldine S. Kieffer and Ephraim Ruebush. Southern gospel was promoted by traveling singing school teachers, quartets, and shape note music publishing companies such as the A. J. Showalter Company (1879) and the Stamps-Baxter Music and Printing Company.

Over time, southern gospel came to be an eclectic musical form with groups singing traditional hymns, a capella (jazz-style singing with no instruments) songs, country, bluegrass, spirituals, and "convention songs". Because it grew out of the musical traditions of white musicians from the American South, the name Southern gospel was used to differentiate it from the black gospel tradition.

Convention songs typically have contrasting homophonic and contrapuntal sections. In the homophonic sections, the four parts sing the same words and rhythms. In the contrapuntal sections, each group member has a unique lyric and rhythm. These songs are called "convention songs" because various conventions were organized across the United States for the purpose of getting together regularly and singing songs in this style. Convention songs were employed by training centers like the Stamps-Baxter School Of Music as a way to teach quartet members how to concentrate on singing their own part. Examples of convention songs include "Heavenly Parade", "I'm Living In Canaan Now", "Give the World a Smile", and "Heaven's Jubilee".

== Early performers ==
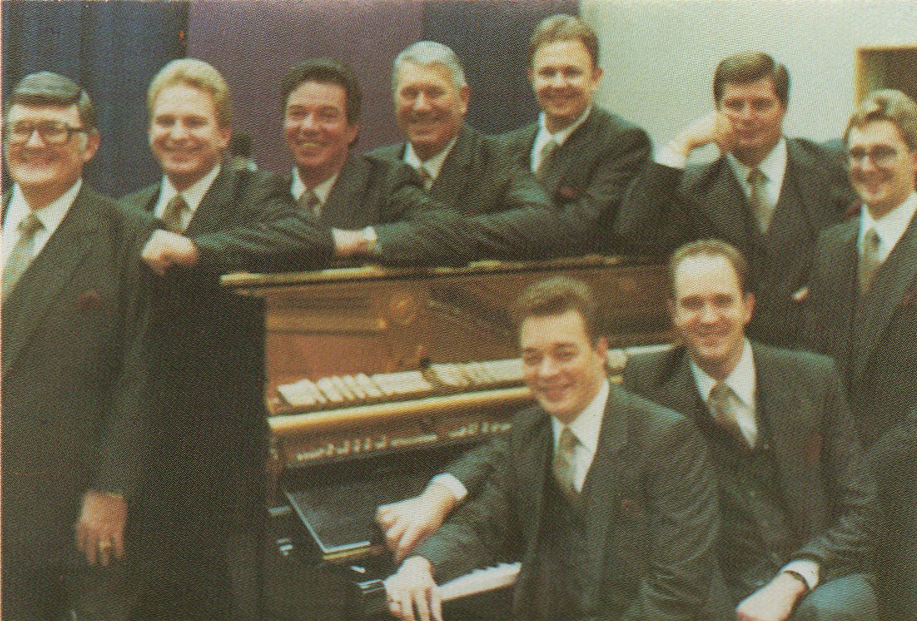
The Kingsmen Quartet in 1985

Southern gospel is sometimes called "quartet music" by fans because of the originally all-male, tenor-lead-baritone-bass quartet makeup. Early quartets were typically either a cappella or accompanied only by piano or guitar, and in some cases a piano and banjo in areas that were influenced by bluegrass music such as Appalachia. Over time, full bands were added and even later, pre-recorded accompaniments (soundtracks) were introduced.

In the first decades of the twentieth century, southern gospel drew much of its creative energy from the holiness movement churches that arose throughout the south. Early gospel artists such as The Speer Family, The Stamps Quartet, The Blackwood Family, and The Lefevre Trio achieved wide popularity through their recordings and radio performances in the 1920s, 1930s, 1940s and 1950s. On October 20, 1927, The Stamps Quartet recorded its early hit "Give The World A Smile" for RCA Victor, which become the Quartet's theme song. The Stamps Quartet was heard on the radio throughout Texas and the South. A handful of groups were considered pioneers in southern gospel music for a series of "firsts." The Blackwood Brothers, with James Blackwood and J.D. Sumner became the first group to travel in a bus, which is on display at the Southern Gospel Museum and Hall of Fame at Dollywood in Pigeon Forge, Tennessee. Sumner also was instrumental in creating the National Quartet Convention, an annual music festival where many groups, both unknown and well known perform for a week. The Speer Family was known for bringing blended groups to mainstream popularity where both male and female performers toured together. The best known group of the 1950s and 1960s was the Statesmen Quartet, which set the trend for broad appeal of the all-male quartets that would develop years later. The Statesmen were known for their showmanship and introduction of jazz, ragtime, and even some early rock and roll elements into their music. They were also known for their stage appearance with trendy suits and wide audience appeal and for their signature song, "Happy Rhythm" (Rockin and a'Rollin).

== Modern Southern gospel ==
By the 1990s, the "old-timey" quartet-style music began to develop to include more soloists and duos. Although still mostly popular in the Southeast and Southwest, it has a nationwide and even international audience. The music remains "more country than city, more down-home than pretentious". The Gaither Homecoming tours and videos began as a reunion of many of the best-known individuals in the industry, first organized Bill and Gloria Gaither in 1991.

In 2005, The Radio Book, a broadcast yearbook published by M Street Publications, reported 285 radio stations in the U.S. with a primary format designation as "southern gospel," including 175 AM stations and 110 FM stations. Southern gospel was the 9th most popular format for AM stations and the 21st most popular for FM. Southern gospel radio promoters routinely service more than a thousand radio stations which play at least some southern gospel music each week. Internet-only southern gospel radio stations have also increased in number.

Two popular satellite stations that feature southern gospel are channel 34 on XM Satellite Radio and Channel 65 (changed from 67) on Sirius Satellite Radio. Both play the same feed entitled, "enLighten on SiriusXm". Enlighten plays southern gospel and has several featured programs which air weekly including Paul Heil's Gospel Greats and Bill Gaither's Homecoming Radio.

Progressive southern gospel is characterized by a blend of traditional southern gospel, bluegrass, modern country, contemporary Christian and pop music elements. Progressive southern gospel generally features artists who push their voices to produce a sound with an edge to it. Lyrically, most progressive southern gospel songs are patterned after traditional southern gospel in that they maintain a clear evangelistic and/or testimonial slant. Southern gospel purists view lyrical content and the underlying musical style as the key determining factors for applying the southern gospel label to a song.

Although there are some exceptions, most southern gospel songs would not be classified as Praise and Worship. Few southern gospel songs are sung "to" God as opposed to "about" God. On the other hand, southern gospel lyrics are typically overt in their Christian message unlike Contemporary Christian music (CCM) which sometimes has had "double entendre" lyrics, which could be interpreted as being about a devout love for God or an earthly love for a man or woman.

== Media ==
Becoming popular through songbooks, such as those published by R. E. Winsett of Dayton, Tennessee, southern gospel was and is one of the few genres to use recordings, radio, and television technologies from the very beginning for the advancements of promoting the genre.

One of the longest-running print magazines for southern gospel music has been the Singing News. They started in the early 1970s supplying radio airplay charts and conducting annual fan-based awards. They also supply popular topic forums for southern gospel fans to meet and discuss the genre. The move to internet services has brought along companies such as SoGospelNews.com which has become a noted e-zine forum for southern gospel and has remained a supporter for the past twelve years. It too contains the music charts with forums and chat rooms available to the fans.

Internet Radio has broadened the southern gospel music fan base by using computer technologies and continual streaming. One of these media outlets is Sunlite Radio, which features many of the southern gospel programs likewise heard on traditional radio. This list includes The Gospel Greats with Paul Heil, which recently celebrated 30 years on the air, Southern Gospel USA, a weekly half-hour countdown show hosted by Gary Wilson, Classic radio programs such as The Old Gospel Ship and Heaven's Jubilee with Jim Loudermilk. Another online station is "The Gospel Station."
