= James David Vaughan =

American singer

- Born: James David Vaughan; December 14, 1864; Giles County, Tennessee United States
- Died: February 9, 1941 (aged 76)
- Genres: Christian

James David Vaughan (December 14, 1864 – February 9, 1941) was an American music teacher, composer, song book publisher, the founder of the Vaughan Conservatory of Music and the James D. Vaughan Publishing Company.

== Biography ==
Vaughan was born in Giles County, Tennessee, the son of George Washington and Eliza (Shores) Vaughan. He died February 9, 1941.

Vaughan is generally considered to be one of the founders of the genre now known as "Southern gospel" music. He started the James D. Vaughan Music Publishing Company in 1900 in Minor Hill, Tennessee, and in 1910 moved to Lawrenceburg, Tennessee. He taught shape note singing schools. He was the first to establish a professional quartet and put them on the road for the purpose of selling songbooks. The Vaughan School of Music was formed in 1911 in Lawrenceburg. Numerous gospel performers would study there in the following years. In 1912, Vaughan began the Vaughan Family Visitor, an influential publication across the South during the early 20th century.

In 1922, Vaughan founded one of the first radio stations in Tennessee, WOAN, where he broadcast Southern Gospel music until 1930. He also founded the first record company based in the South, Vaughan Phonograph Records. Vaughan was also involved in local politics, serving as mayor of Lawrenceburg from 1923 to 1927, a position his brother Charles Wesley and son would hold after him.

As one of the most significant figures in southern gospel music, James D. Vaughan was inducted into the Gospel Music Hall of Fame in 1972 and the Southern Gospel Music Hall of Fame in 1997.
