= The History of Rock and Roll contents =

Radio documentary on rock and roll music

The History of Rock and Roll is a radio documentary on rock and roll music, originally syndicated in 1969, and again in 1978 and 1981. It is currently distributed as both a 2 1/2-minute short feature on internet networks, and a two-hour weekly series hosted by Wink Martindale, distributed to radio stations nationwide. This list below reflects the contents of the more widely heard 1978 version of The History of Rock & Roll.

== The Birth Of Rock And Roll ==
- Intro
- 1978-1955 Time Sweep
- 50s R&B Hit Sweep
- The Moonglows - Sincerely (1955)
- The Penguins - Earth Angel (1955)
- Bo Diddley - Bo Diddley (1955)
- Chuck Berry - Maybellene (1955)
- Chuck Berry - School Day (1956)
- Chuck Berry - Rock And Roll Music (1957)
- Chuck Berry Hit Sweep
- Chuck Berry - Johnny B. Goode (1958)
- Lloyd Price - Lawdy Miss Clawdy (1952)
- Fats Domino - Ain't That A Shame (1955)
- Fats Domino Hit Sweep
- Fats Domino - Blue Monday (1957)
- Fats Domino - Blueberry Hill (1957)
- Fats Domino - Walking to New Orleans (1960)
- Little Richard - Tutti Frutti (1956)
- Little Richard Hit Sweep
- Little Richard - "Good Golly, Miss Molly" (1958)

== Country Rock ==
- Bill Haley & His Comets - Shake Rattle And Roll (1954)
- Bill Haley & His Comets - Crazy Man Crazy (1953)
- Bill Haley & His Comets - Rock Around the Clock (1955)
- Carl Perkins - Blue Suede Shoes (1956)
- Johnny Cash - I Walk The Line (1956)
- Johnny Cash - Ballad Of A Teenage Queen (1958)
- Jerry Lee Lewis - Great Balls Of Fire (1957)
- Jerry Lee Lewis - Whole Lotta Shakin' Goin' On (1957)
- Jerry Lee Lewis - High School Confidential (1958)
- Jerry Lee Lewis - Breathless (1958)
- Elvis Presley - That's All Right (1954)
- Elvis Presley - Good Rockin' Tonight (1954)
- Elvis Presley - Mystery Train (1955)

== Elvis Presley-Part II ==
- Heartbreak Hotel (1956)
- Hound Dog (1956)
- Don't Be Cruel (1956)
- Love Me Tender (1956)
- All Shook Up (1957)
- Teddy Bear (1957)
- Jailhouse Rock (1957)
- Don't (1958)
- Hard Headed Woman (1958)
- I Got Stung (1958)
- A Fool Such As I (1959)
- I Need Your Love Tonight (1959)
- A Big Hunk O' Love (1959)
- My Wish Came True (1959)
- Stuck On You (1960)
- It's Now Or Never (1960)
- Are You Lonesome Tonight? (1960)

== Elvis Presley-Part III ==
- Can't Help Falling In Love (1961)
- Return To Sender (1962)
- Devil In Disguise (1963)
- "Crying in the Chapel" (1965)
- If I Can Dream (1968)
- In The Ghetto (1969)
- Suspicious Minds (1969)
- Burning Love (1972)
- Also Sprach Zarathustra (Live 1972)
- That's All Right (Live 1972)
- Are You Lonesome Tonight? (Live 1969)
- Hound Dog (Live 1969)
- Blue Suede Shoes (Live 1969)
- All Shook Up (Live 1969)
- An American Trilogy (Live 1972)
- My Way (Live 1977)
- Can't Help Falling In Love (Live 1969)
- The Impossible Dream (Live 1972)

== 50s Rhythm & Blues ==
- The Coasters - Young Blood (1957)
- The Coasters - Searchin' (1957)
- The Coasters - Yakety Yak (1958)
- The Coasters - Charlie Brown (1959)
- The Drifters - Honey Love (1954)
- The Drifters - There Goes My Baby (1959)
- The Drifters Hit Sweep #1
- The Drifters - Save the Last Dance for Me (1960)
- The Drifters Hit Sweep #2
- The Drifters - Up on the Roof (1963)
- The Drifters - "Under the Boardwalk" (1964)
- Ray Charles - I Got A Woman (1955)
- Ray Charles - What'd I Say (1959)
- Ray Charles - Georgia On My Mind (1960)
- Ray Charles - I Can't Stop Loving You (1962)
- Ray Charles Hit Sweep
- Ray Charles - You Are My Sunshine (1962)

== 50s Rockabilly ==
- Gene Vincent & His Blue Caps - Be-Bop-a-Lula (1956)
- Buddy Knox - Party Doll (1957)
- The Crickets - That'll Be The Day (1957)
- Buddy Holly & The Crickets Hit Sweep
- Buddy Holly - Peggy Sue (1957)
- The Crickets - Oh Boy! (1957)
- Buddy Holly - It Doesn't Matter Anymore (1959)
- Eddie Cochran - Sittin' In The Balcony (1958)
- Eddie Cochran - Summertime Blues (1958)
- The Everly Brothers - Wake Up Little Susie (1957)
- The Everly Brothers - Bye Bye Love (1957)
- The Everly Brothers Hit Sweep
- The Everly Brothers - All I Have To Do Is Dream (1958)
- The Everly Brothers - "Cathy's Clown" (1960)
- The Everly Brothers - "Ebony Eyes" (1961)
- Roy Orbison - Only The Lonely (1960)
- Roy Orbison - "Oh, Pretty Woman" (1964)

== Superstars Of The Late 50s-Early 60s - Part 1 ==
- Pat Boone - Love Letters In The Sand (1957)
- Pat Boone Hit Sweep
- Pat Boone - "Moody River" (1961)
- Paul Anka - Diana (1957)
- Paul Anka - Lonely Boy (1959)
- Paul Anka Hit Sweep
- Paul Anka - Put Your Head On My Shoulder (1959)
- Neil Sedaka - "Calendar Girl" (1960)
- Neil Sedaka Hit Sweep
- Neil Sedaka - Breaking Up Is Hard to Do (1962)
- Ricky Nelson - Poor Little Fool (1958)
- Ricky Nelson - Lonesome Town (1958)
- Ricky Nelson - "Hello Mary Lou" (1961)
- Ricky Nelson Hit Sweep
- Bobby Darin - Splish Splash (1958)
- Bobby Darin Hit Sweep
- Bobby Darin - Mack The Knife (1959)
- Bobby Darin - If I Were a Carpenter (1966)

== Superstars Of The Late 50s-Early 60s - Part II ==
- Sam Cooke - You Send Me (1957)
- Sam Cooke - Chain Gang (1960)
- Sam Cooke Hit Sweep
- Sam Cooke - Bring It On Home To Me (1962)
- Sam Cooke - Another Saturday Night (1963)
- Jackie Wilson - Lonely Teardrops (1959)
- Jackie Wilson - "Baby Workout" (1963)
- Jackie Wilson Hit Sweep
- Jackie Wilson - (Your Love Keeps Lifting Me) Higher And Higher (1967)
- Dion and the Belmonts - A Teenager in Love (1959)
- Dion and the Belmonts Hit Sweep
- Dion - The Wanderer (1962)
- Dion - Runaround Sue (1961)
- Dion - Ruby Baby (1963)
- Chubby Checker - The Twist (1960)
- Chubby Checker - Limbo Rock (1962)

== The Hits Of '56 & '57 ==
- The Platters - Only You (1956)
- The Teenagers - Why Do Fools Fall In Love (1956)
- Little Richard - "Long Tall Sally" (1956)
- 1956 #1s Chart Sweep
- Bill Doggett - Honky Tonk (1956)
- The Five Satins - In The Still Of The Night (1956)
- Jim Lowe - Green Door (1956)
- The Dells - Oh What A Night (1956)
- 1956 Classic Hits Chart Sweep
- Elvis Presley - Love Me (1956)
- Fats Domino - I'm Walkin' (1957)
- 1957 #1s Chart Sweep
- The Del-Vikings - Come Go With Me (1957)
- The Diamonds - Little Darlin' (1957)
- Marty Robbins - A White Sport Coat (And A Pink Carnation) (1957)
- Jimmie Rodgers - Honeycomb (1957)
- The Rays - Silhouettes (1957)
- Danny & The Juniors - At The Hop (1957)
- 1957 Big Hits Chart Sweep

== The Hits Of '58 & '59 ==
- Chuck Berry - "Sweet Little Sixteen" (1958)
- 1958 #1s Chart Sweep
- The Champs - Tequila (1958)
- The Elegants - Little Star (1958)
- The Big Bopper - Chantilly Lace (1958)
- Little Anthony & The Imperials - Tears On My Pillow (1958)
- The Moonglows - The Ten Commandments Of Love (1958)
- 1958 Big Hits Chart Sweep
- The Kingston Trio - Tom Dooley (1958)
- The Platters - Smoke Gets In Your Eyes (1959)
- 1959 #1s Chart Sweep
- The Crests - 16 Candles (1959)
- Lloyd Price - Stagger Lee (1959)
- Ritchie Valens - La Bamba (1959)
- Frankie Avalon - Venus (1959)
- Wilbert Harrison - Kansas City (1959)
- 1959 Big Hits Chart Sweep
- The Flamingos - I Only Have Eyes For You (1959)

== The Hits Of '60 & '61 ==
- Brenda Lee - Sweet Nothin's (1960)
- 1960 Big Hits Chart Sweep
- Jimmy Jones - Handy Man (1960)
- Bobby Rydell - Wild One (1960)
- Hank Ballard & The Midnighters - Finger Poppin' Time (1960)
- Barrett Strong - Money (1960)
- Ray Peterson - Tell Laura I Love Her (1960)
- 1960 #1s Chart Sweep
- The Ventures - Walk Don't Run (1960)
- Maurice Williams and the Zodiacs - Stay (1960)
- Connie Francis - "Where the Boys Are" (1961)
- Chubby Checker - Pony Time (1961)
- Elvis Presley - Surrender (1961)
- 1961 Big Hits Chart Sweep
- Ernie K-Doe - Mother-In-Law (1961)
- Del Shannon - Runaway (1961)
- The Marcels - Blue Moon (1961)
- 1961 #1s Chart Sweep
- Ricky Nelson - Travelin' Man (1961)
- Bobby Lewis - Tossin' and Turnin' (1961)
- Curtis Lee - Pretty Little Angel Eyes (1961)

== The Hits Of '62 & '63 ==
- Little Eva - The Loco-Motion (1962)
- Sam Cooke - Twistin' the Night Away (1962)
- Bobby Vinton - Roses Are Red (1962)
- 1962 Big Hits Chart Sweep
- Gene Chandler - Duke of Earl (1962)
- The Crystals - He's a Rebel (1962)
- 1962 #1s Chart Sweep
- Tommy Roe - Sheila (1962)
- Bobby "Boris" Pickett & The Crypt-Kickers - Monster Mash (1962)
- Bobby Vee - The Night Has a Thousand Eyes (1963)
- The Chiffons - He's So Fine (1963)
- 1963 Big Hits Chart Sweep
- Peter Paul & Mary - "Puff The Magic Dragon" (1963)
- Jan & Dean - "Surf City" (1963)
- The Surfaris - Wipe Out (1963)
- 1963 #1s Chart Sweep
- Nino Tempo & April Stevens - Deep Purple (1963)
- Jimmy Gilmer & The Fireballs - "Sugar Shack" (1963)

== The Hits Of '64 & '65 ==
- Lesley Gore - "You Don't Own Me" (1964)
- 1964 Big Hits Chart Sweep
- Jan & Dean - "Dead Man's Curve" (1964)
- Peter & Gordon - "A World Without Love" (1964)
- Johnny Rivers - Memphis (1964)
- The Shangri-La's - Remember (Walkin' In The Sand) (1964)
- Herman's Hermits - "I'm into Something Good" (1964)
- 1964 #1s Chart Sweep
- The Kinks - "All Day and All of the Night" (1964)
- Sam The Sham & The Pharaohs - "Wooly Bully" (1965)
- 1965 Big Hits Chart Sweep
- Jay & The Americans - "Cara Mia" (1965)
- Sonny & Cher - "I Got You Babe" (1965)
- The McCoys - "Hang On Sloopy" (1965)
- The Byrds - "Mr. Tambourine Man" (1965)
- Petula Clark - Downtown (1965)
- 1965 #1s Chart Sweep
- The Supremes - "I Hear a Symphony" (1965)
- The Beatles - "We Can Work It Out" (1965)

== Girl Groups/Phil Spector ==
- The Chantels - Maybe (1958)
- The Shirelles - "Will You Love Me Tomorrow?" (1961)
- The Shirelles - Soldier Boy (1962)
- The Chiffons - One Fine Day (1963)
- The Angels - My Boyfriend's Back (1963)
- The Shangri-Las - I Can Never Go Home Anymore (1965)
- The Shangri-Las - "Leader of the Pack" (1964)
- The Ronettes - Walking In The Rain (1964)
- The Ronettes - Be My Baby (1963)
- The Crystals - He's Sure The Boy I Love (1963)
- The Crystals - Then He Kissed Me (1963)
- The Crystals - Da Doo Ron Ron (1963)
- The Righteous Brothers - You've Lost That Lovin' Feeling (1964)
- The Teddy Bears - To Know Him Is To Love Him (1958)
- The Skyliners - Since I Don't Have You (1959)
- Bob B. Soxx & The Blue Jeans - Zip-A-Dee Doo-Dah (1963)
- Four Tops - "Reach Out I'll Be There" (1966)

== Motown Sound-Part 1 ==
- The Miracles - Shop Around (1960)
- The Marvelettes - "Please Mr. Postman" (1961)
- The Contours - Do You Love Me (1962)
- The Miracles - "You've Really Got a Hold on Me" (1962)
- Marvin Gaye - Pride And Joy (1963)
- Martha & The Vandellas - "Come and Get These Memories" (1963)
- Martha & The Vandellas - Heat Wave (1963)
- Marvin Gaye - Can I Get A Witness (1963)
- Mary Wells - My Guy (1964)
- The Supremes - "Where Did Our Love Go" (1964)
- Four Tops - Baby I Need Your Loving (1964)
- Martha & The Vandellas - Dancing In The Street (1964)
- The Supremes - Baby Love (1964)
- The Supremes - "Come See About Me" (1964)
- Marvin Gaye - "How Sweet It Is (To Be Loved by You)" (1965)

== Four Seasons Vs. Beach Boys ==
- The Four Seasons - Sherry (1962)
- The Four Seasons - "Walk Like a Man" (1963)
- The Four Seasons - "Candy Girl" (1963)
- The Four Seasons - "Dawn (Go Away)" (1964)
- The Four Seasons - Rag Doll (1964)
- The Four Seasons - "Let's Hang On" (1965)
- Frankie Valli - Can't Take My Eyes Off You (1967)
- The Beach Boys - "Surfin' U.S.A." (1963)
- The Beach Boys - "Surfer Girl" (1963)
- The Beach Boys - Fun Fun Fun (1964)
- The Beach Boys - "I Get Around" (1964)
- The Beach Boys - "Help Me, Rhonda" (1965)
- The Beach Boys - "California Girls" (1965)
- The Beach Boys - Barbara Ann (1965)
- The Beach Boys - Good Vibrations (1966)

== Beatles-Part 1 ==
- Tony Sheridan & The Beatles - My Bonnie (1961)
- The Beatles - Ain't She Sweet (1964)
- The Beatles - Love Me Do (1962)
- The Beatles - "Please Please Me" (1963)
- The Beatles - I Want to Hold Your Hand (1963)
- The Beatles - "I Saw Her Standing There" (1963)
- The Beatles - This Boy (1963)
- The Beatles - All My Loving (1963)
- The Beatles - "She Loves You" (1963)
- The Beatles - Can't Buy Me Love (1964)
- The Beatles - Twist and Shout (1963)
- The Beatles - Do You Want to Know a Secret (1963)
- The Beatles - P.S. I Love You (1962)
- The Beatles - A Hard Day's Night (1964)
- The Beatles - And I Love Her (1964)
- The Beatles - She's A Woman (1964)

== British Invasion ==
- The Dave Clark Five - "Glad All Over" (1964)
- The Dave Clark Five Hit Sweep
- The Dave Clark Five – Over And Over (1965)
- The Dave Clark Five - Because (1964)
- The Dave Clark Five - Any Way You Want It (1964)
- The Kinks - "You Really Got Me" (1964)
- The Kinks Hit Sweep
- The Kinks - "Tired of Waiting for You" (1965)
- The Animals - "We Gotta Get Out of This Place" (1965)
- The Animals Hit Sweep
- The Animals - "The House of the Rising Sun" (1964)
- The Yardbirds - For Your Love (1965)
- The Yardbirds - "Heart Full of Soul" (1965)
- The Yardbirds - I'm A Man (1965)
- The Zombies - "She's Not There" (1964)
- Wayne Fontana & The Mindbenders - Game Of Love (1965)
- The Honeycombs - "Have I the Right?" (1964)
- The Searchers - "Needles and Pins" (1964)
- The Searchers - Love Potion #9 (1964)
- Manfred Mann - Do Wah Diddy Diddy (1964)

== Beatles-Part II ==
- The Beatles - "I Feel Fine" (1964)
- The Beatles - Eight Days A Week (1964)
- The Beatles - "Ticket To Ride" (1965)
- The Beatles - Help! (1965)
- The Beatles - Norwegian Wood (1965)
- The Beatles - Rubber Soul Montage
- The Beatles - Michelle (1965)
- The Beatles - Yesterday (1965)
- The Beatles - "Day Tripper" (1965)
- The Beatles - "Nowhere Man" (1965)
- The Beatles - Sgt. Pepper's Lonely Hearts Club Band (1967)
- The Beatles - With A Little Help From My Friends (1967)
- The Beatles - She's Leaving Home (1967)
- The Beatles - A Day In The Life (1967)
- The Beatles - Sgt. Pepper's Lonely Hearts Club Band (Reprise) (1967)

== Motown Sound-Part II ==
- Martha & The Vandellas - Nowhere To Run (1965)
- The Temptations - My Girl (1965)
- The Supremes - "Stop! In the Name of Love" (1965)
- Four Tops - I Can't Help Myself (1965)
- The Miracles - "The Tracks of My Tears" (1965)
- Marvin Gaye - "I'll Be Doggone" (1965)
- Jimmy Ruffin - What Becomes Of The Brokenhearted? (1966)
- The Supremes - "You Can't Hurry Love" (1966)
- Four Tops - Standing In The Shadows Of Love (1967)
- Four Tops - Bernadette (1967)
- Martha & The Vandellas - Jimmy Mack (1967)
- Diana Ross & The Supremes - Reflections (1967)
- Gladys Knight & The Pips - I Heard It Through The Grapevine (1967)
- Smokey Robinson & The Miracles - I Second That Emotion (1967)
- Marvin Gaye & Tammi Terrell - Ain't No Mountain High Enough (1967)
- The Temptations - I Wish It Would Rain (1967)

== Folk Rock ==
- The Lovin' Spoonful - "Do You Believe in Magic?" (1965)
- The Lovin' Spoonful - Daydream (1966)
- The Lovin' Spoonful Hit Sweep
- The Lovin' Spoonful - "Summer in the City" (1966)
- The Byrds - Eight Miles High (1966)
- The Byrds - "Turn Turn Turn" (1965)
- Donovan - "Catch the Wind" (1965)
- Donovan - "Sunshine Superman" (1966)
- Simon & Garfunkel - Bookends (1968)
- Tom & Jerry - Hey Schoolgirl (1957)
- Simon & Garfunkel - The Sounds Of Silence (1965)
- Simon & Garfunkel - Homeward Bound (1966)
- Simon & Garfunkel - "I Am a Rock" (1966)
- Simon & Garfunkel - Scarborough Fair (Canticle) (1968)
- Simon & Garfunkel - Mrs. Robinson (1968)
- Simon & Garfunkel - Bridge Over Troubled Water (1970)

== Rolling Stones-Part I ==
- The Rolling Stones - Time Is On My Side (1964)
- The Rolling Stones - The Last Time (1965)
- The Rolling Stones - "(I Can't Get No) Satisfaction" (1965)
- The Rolling Stones - "Get Off of My Cloud" (1965)
- The Rolling Stones - As Tears Go By (1965)
- The Rolling Stones - "19th Nervous Breakdown" (1966)
- The Rolling Stones - Paint It Black (1966)
- The Rolling Stones - Mother's Little Helper (1966)
- The Rolling Stones - Have You Seen Your Mother Baby Standing In The Shadow? (1966)
- The Rolling Stones - Ruby Tuesday (1967)
- The Rolling Stones - Let's Spend The Night Together (1967)
- The Rolling Stones - Dandelion (1967)
- The Rolling Stones - Jumpin' Jack Flash (1968)
- Rolling Stones Hit Sweep
- The Rolling Stones - Honky Tonk Women (1969)

== Beatles-Part III ==
- The Beatles - Penny Lane (1967)
- The Beatles - Strawberry Fields Forever (1967)
- The Beatles - All You Need Is Love (1967)
- The Beatles - Yellow Submarine (1966)
- The Beatles - Hey Jude (1968)
- The Beatles - Revolution (1968)
- The Beatles - White Album Montage
- The Beatles - Get Back (1969)
- The Beatles - Come Together (1969)
- The Beatles - Something (1969)
- The Beatles - Let It Be (1970)
- The Beatles - The Long And Winding Road (1970)

== Beatles-Solo ==
- The Plastic Ono Band - Give Peace A Chance (1969)
- John Lennon & The Plastic Ono Band - Instant Karma! (1970)
- John Lennon & The Plastic Ono Band - Imagine (1971)
- John Lennon & The Plastic Ono Nuclear Band - Whatever Gets You Thru The Night (1974)
- John Lennon - #9 Dream (1974)
- George Harrison - My Sweet Lord (1970)
- George Harrison - What Is Life (1970)
- George Harrison - Bangla Desh (Live 1971)
- George Harrison - Give Me Love (Give Me Peace On Earth) (1973)
- Ringo Starr - It Don't Come Easy (1971)
- Ringo Starr - Back Off Boogaloo (1972)
- Ringo Starr - Photograph (1973)

== Bob Dylan ==
- Bob Dylan - Blowin' In The Wind (1963)
- Bob Dylan - The Times They Are A-Changin' (1963)
- Bob Dylan - Subterranean Homesick Blues (1965)
- Bob Dylan - Like A Rolling Stone (1965)
- Bob Dylan - "Positively 4th Street" (1965)
- Bob Dylan - Rainy Day Women #12 & 35 (1966)
- Bob Dylan - I Want You (1966)
- Bob Dylan - Just Like A Woman (1966)
- Bob Dylan Cover Songs Montage
- Bob Dylan - All Along The Watchtower (1967)
- Bob Dylan - Lay Lady Lay (1969)
- Bob Dylan - Knocking On Heaven's Door (1973)
- Bob Dylan - Concert For Bangla Desh Live Montage (1971)
- Bob Dylan - Most Likely You'll Go Your Way And I'll Go Mine (Live 1974)

== San Francisco Sound ==
- Scott MacKenzie - San Francisco (Be Sure To Wear Flowers In Your Hair) (1967)
- Jefferson Airplane - Somebody To Love (1967)
- Jefferson Airplane - White Rabbit (1967)
- Strawberry Alarm Clock - Incense And Peppermints (1967)
- Big Brother & The Holding Company - Piece Of My Heart (1968)
- Janis Joplin - Me And Bobby McGee (1971)
- Creedence Clearwater Revival - Susie Q (1968)
- Creedence Clearwater Revival - Proud Mary (1969)
- Creedence Clearwater Revival - Bad Moon Rising (1969)
- Creedence Clearwater Revival - Green River (1969)
- Creedence Clearwater Revival - Born On The Bayou (1969)
- Santana - Black Magic Woman (1970)
- Santana - Evil Ways (1969)

== Soft British Rock ==
- The Hollies - Bus Stop (1965)
- The Hollies - Stop Stop Stop (1966)
- The Hollies Hit Sweep
- The Hollies - He Ain't Heavy He's My Brother (1969)
- The Hollies - Long Cool Woman In A Black Dress (1971)
- Bee Gees - New York Mining Disaster 1941 (1967)
- Bee Gees - I Started A Joke (1968)
- Bee Gees Hit Sweep
- Bee Gees - How Can You Mend A Broken Heart (1971)
- Bee Gees - Jive Talkin' (1975)
- Bee Gees - You Should Be Dancing (1976)
- The Moody Blues - Tuesday Afternoon (1967)
- The Moody Blues - Questions (1970)
- The Moody Blues - Nights In White Satin (1967)

== Hard Rock-Part 1 ==
- Cream - Sunshine Of Your Love (1967)
- Cream - White Room (1968)
- Steppenwolf - Rock Me (1969)
- Steppenwolf - Born To Be Wild (1968)
- Steppenwolf - Magic Carpet Ride (1968)
- The Doors - Light My Fire (1967)
- The Doors - Hello I Love You (1968)
- The Doors - Love Her Madly (1971)
- The Doors - Riders On The Storm (1971)
- The Guess Who - Shakin' All Over (1965)
- The Guess Who - These Eyes (1969)
- The Guess Who Hit Sweep
- The Guess Who - American Woman (1970)

== Hard Rock-Part II ==
- The Who - I Can See For Miles (1967)
- The Who - See Me Feel Me (1969)
- The Who - Pinball Wizard (1969)
- The Who - Won't Get Fooled Again (1971)
- Iron Butterfly - In-A-Gadda-Da-Vida (1968)
- Deep Purple - Hush (1968)
- Deep Purple - Smoke On The Water (1972)
- Led Zeppelin - Whole Lotta Love (1969)
- Led Zeppelin - Immigrant Song (1970)
- Led Zeppelin - Black Dog (1971)
- Led Zeppelin - Stairway To Heaven (1971)

== The Hits Of '66 & '67 ==
- The Troggs - Wild Thing (1966)
- 1966 Big Hits Chart Sweep
- The Monkees - I'm a Believer (1966)
- Lou Christie - "Lightnin' Strikes" (1966)
- The Righteous Brothers - "(You're My) Soul and Inspiration" (1966)
- 1966 #1s Chart Sweep
- The Mamas & the Papas - California Dreamin' (1966)
- Johnny Rivers - "Poor Side of Town" (1966)
- The Association - Cherish (1966)
- Bobbie Gentry - Ode To Billie Joe (1967)
- The Young Rascals - Groovin' (1967)
- Neil Diamond - Thank the Lord for the Night Time (1967)
- 1967 Big Hits Chart Sweep
- The Jimi Hendrix Experience - Purple Haze (1967)
- Buffalo Springfield - For What It's Worth (1967)
- 1967 #1s Chart Sweep
- Procol Harum - A Whiter Shade Of Pale (1967)

== Good-Time Rock Groups Of The 60s ==
- Gary Lewis & the Playboys - "This Diamond Ring" (1965)
- Bobby Fuller Four - "I Fought the Law" (1966)
- The Shadows Of Knight - Gloria (1966)
- The Young Rascals - "Good Lovin'" (1966)
- Paul Revere & The Raiders - Kicks (1966)
- The Standells - Dirty Water (1966)
- Tommy James & The Shondells - Hanky Panky (1966)
- ? and the Mysterians - "96 Tears" (1966)
- The Monkees - "Last Train to Clarksville" (1966)
- Count Five - "Psychotic Reaction" (1966)
- Mitch Ryder & The Detroit Wheels - "Devil with a Blue Dress On/Good Golly Miss Molly" (1966)
- Blues Magoos - (We Ain't Got) Nothin' Yet (1967)
- The Buckinghams - Kind Of A Drag (1967)
- The Turtles - Happy Together (1967)
- The Box Tops - The Letter (1967)
- John Fred & His Playboy Band - Judy In Disguise (1968)
- The Grass Roots - Midnight Confessions (1968)

== Soul In The 60s ==
- Arthur Conley - Sweet Soul Music (1967)
- Joe Tex - "Hold What You've Got" (1964)
- James Brown - "Papa's Got a Brand New Bag" (1965)
- James Brown Hit Sweep
- Wilson Pickett - "In the Midnight Hour" (1965)
- Wilson Pickett Hit Sweep
- Percy Sledge - "When a Man Loves a Woman" (1966)
- Sam & Dave - Soul Man (1967)
- Aretha Franklin - I Never Loved A Man (The Way I Love You) (1967)
- Aretha Franklin - Chain Of Fools (1968)
- Aretha Franklin - (You Make Me Feel Like) A Natural Woman (1967)
- Aretha Franklin Hit Sweep
- Aretha Franklin - Respect (1967)
- Otis Redding - (Sittin' On) The Dock Of The Bay (1968)
- Sly & The Family Stone - Dance To The Music (1968)
- Sly & The Family Stone Hit Sweep
- Sly & The Family Stone - Everyday People (1968)
- Sly & The Family Stone - Thank You (Falettinme Be Mice Elf Agin) (1970)
- Sly & The Family Stone - Family Affair (1971)

== The Hits Of '68 & '69 ==
- Johnny Nash - Hold Me Tight (1968)
- Marvin Gaye - I Heard It Through The Grapevine (1968)
- 1968 Big Hits Chart Sweep
- Richard Harris - MacArthur Park (1968)
- Mary Hopkin - Those Were The Days (1968)
- Bobby Goldsboro - Honey (1968)
- 1968 #1s Chart Sweep
- Jose Feliciano - Light My Fire (1968)
- Peter Paul & Mary - Leaving On A Jet Plane (1969)
- The 5th Dimension - Aquarius/Let The Sunshine In (1969)
- Three Dog Night - Easy To Be Hard (1969)
- 1969 Big Hits Chart Sweep
- Elvis Presley - Don't Cry Daddy (1969)
- 1969 #1s Chart Sweep
- B.J. Thomas - Raindrops Keep Fallin' On My Head (1969)
- Classics IV Featuring Dennis Yost - Traces (1969)

== The 1970s ==
=== Hits of the 1970s (part 1) ===
- Shocking Blue - Venus (1970)
- Diana Ross & The Supremes - Someday We'll Be Together (1970)
- Chart Sweep: 1970 hits
- (Tony Orlando and) Dawn - Knock Three Times (1971)
- Norman Greenbaum - Spirit in the Sky (1970)
- Chart Sweep: 1970 #1s
- Creedence Clearwater Revival - Travelitn' Band (1970)
- The Guess Who - No Time (1970)
- The Ides of March - Vehicle (1970)
- Van Morrison - Domino (1970)
- Three Dog Night - Liar (1971)
- Chart Sweep: 1971 hits
- Ike & Tina Turner - Proud Mary (1971)
- Don McLean - American Pie (1971)
- Chart Sweep: 1971 #1s
- Neil Young - Heart of Gold (1972)
- Roberta Flack - The First Time Ever I Saw Your Face (1972)
- Chart Sweep: 1972 hits
- Nilsson - Without You (1972)
- Badfinger - Day After Day (1972)
- T. Rex - Bang a Gong (Get It On) (1972)
- Chart Sweep: 1972 #1s
- Raspberries - Go All the Way (1972)
- Led Zeppelin - D'yer Mak'er (1973)
- Chart Sweep: 1973 hits
- Eddie Kendricks - Keep On Truckin' (1973)
- Billy Preston - Will It Go Round in Circles (1973)
- Paul Simon - Kodachrome (1973)
- Chart Sweep: 1973 #1s
- Anne Murray - Danny's Song (1973)
- Charlie Rich - The Most Beautiful Girl (1973)
- ABBA - Waterloo (1974)
- The Hollies - The Air That I Breathe (1974)
- Chart Sweep: 1974 hits
- Olivia Newton-John - I Honestly Love You (1974)
- MFSB - TSOP (The Sound of Philadelphia) (1974)
- Stevie Wonder - You Haven't Done Nothin' (1974)
- Chart Sweep: 1974 #1s
- Neil Sedaka - Laughter in the Rain (1974)
- Captain & Tennille - Love Will Keep Us Together (1975)
- America - Sister Golden Hair (1975)
- Chart Sweep: 1975 hits
- Janis Ian - At Seventeen (1975)
- Van McCoy - The Hustle (1975)
- 10cc - I'm Not in Love (1975)
- Chart Sweep: 1975 #1s
- Michael Martin Murphey - Wildfire (1975)
- The Bellamy Brothers - Let Your Love Flow (1976)
- Cliff Richard - Devil Woman (1976)
- Chart Sweep: 1976 hits
- Kiss - Beth (1976)
- Gary Wright - Dream Weaver (1976)
- Daryl Hall & John Oates - She's Gone (1976)
- Chart Sweep: 1976 #1s
- Rod Stewart - Tonight's the Night (Gonna Be Alright) (1976)
- Alan O'Day - Undercover Angel (1977)
- Meco - Star Wars Theme / Cantina The Band (1977)
- Chart Sweep: 1977 hits
- Mary McGregor - Torn Between Two Lovers (1977)
- ABBA - Dancing Queen (1977)
- Donna Summer - I Feel Love (1977)
- Chart Sweep: 1977 #1s
- Commodores - Easy (1977)

=== Jim Croce ===
- Jim Croce - You Don't Mess Around with Jim (1972)
- Jim Croce - Bad, Bad Leroy Brown (1973)
- Jim Croce - Time in a Bottle (1973)
- Jim Croce - I'll Have to Say I Love You in a Song (1974)

=== Carly Simon ===
- Carly Simon - That's the Way I've Always Heard It Should Be (1971)
- Carly Simon - Anticipation (1971)
- Carly Simon - You're So Vain (1973)

=== James Taylor ===
- James Taylor - Fire and Rain (1970)
- James Taylor - You've Got a Friend (1971)

=== Carole King ===
- Carole King - I Feel the Earth Move (1971)
- Montage of songs composed by Carole King
- Carole King - It's Too Late (1971)
- Montage of Carole King's hits
- Carole King - Jazzman (1974)

=== Glen Campbell ===
- Glen Campbell - By the Time I Get to Phoenix (1967)
- Glen Campbell - Wichita Lineman (1969)
- Glen Campbell - Rhinestone Cowboy (1975)

=== Neil Diamond ===
- Neil Diamond - Sweet Caroline (1969)
- Neil Diamond - Cracklin' Rosie (1970)
- Neil Diamond - Song Sung Blue (1972)
- Neil Diamond - I Am... I Said (Live) (1972)

=== Crosby, Stills, Nash & Young ===
- Crosby, Stills, & Nash - Suite: Judy Blue Eyes (1968)
- Crosby, Stills, Nash, & Young - Woodstock (1970)

=== Bread ===
- Bread - Make It with You (1970)
- Bread - If (1971)
- Montage of Bread's hits

=== The Carpenters ===
- Carpenters - (They Long to Be) Close to You (1970)
- Montage of the Carpenters' hits

=== 70s Soft Rock ===
- Gordon Lightfoot - If You Could Read My Mind (1970)
- John Denver - Take Me Home, Country Roads (1971)
- John Denver - Rocky Mountain High (1972)
- America - A Horse with No Name (1972)
- Jackson Browne - Doctor My Eyes (1972)
- Cat Stevens - Morning Has Broken (1972)
- Lobo - Don't Expect Me to Be Your Friend (1972)
- Joni Mitchell - Help Me (1974)
- Jefferson Starship - Miracles (1975)
- Barry Manilow - I Write the Songs (1976)
- Seals and Crofts - Get Closer (1976)
- England Dan & John Ford Coley - I'd Really Love to See You Tonight (1976)
- Starland Vocal Band - Afternoon Delight (1976)

=== 70s Soul and Funk ===
- B. B. King - The Thrill Is Gone (1970)
- The Jackson 5 - I Want You Back (1969)
- The Jackson 5 - ABC (1970)
- Isaac Hayes - Theme from 'Shaft' (1971)
- Al Green - Let's Stay Together (1972)
- The Staple Singers - I'll Take You There (1972)
- The Temptations - Papa Was a Rolling Stone (1972)
- Curtis Mayfield - "Freddie's Dead (Theme from 'Superfly')" (1972)
- O'Jays - Love Train (1973)
- War - The Cisco Kid (1973)
- Gladys Knight & The Pips - Midnight Train to Georgia (1973)
- Ohio Players - Fire (1975)
- Earth, Wind & Fire - Shining Star (1975)
- Rose Royce - Car Wash (1976)

=== Disco ===
- KC and the Sunshine Band - That's the Way (I Like It) (1975)
- Montage of KC and the Sunshine Band's hits
- Donna Summer - Love to Love You Baby (1975)
- Diana Ross - Love Hangover (1976)
- The Spinners - The Rubberband Man (1976)
- Leo Sayer - You Make Me Feel Like Dancing (1976)

=== Blood, Sweat & Tears ===
- Blood, Sweat & Tears - You Made Me So Very Happy (1969)
- Blood, Sweat & Tears - Spinning Wheel (1969)

=== Chicago ===
- Chicago - Make Me Smile (1970)
- Chicago - 25 or 6 to 4 (1970)
- Chicago - Colour My World (1971)
- Chicago - Saturday in the Park (1972)
- Montage of Chicago's album tracks
- Chicago - If You Leave Me Now (1976)

=== Three Dog Night ===
- Three Dog Night - One (1969)
- Three Dog Night - Mama Told Me Not to Come (1970)
- Three Dog Night - Joy to the World (1971)

=== Progressive rock ===
- Rare Earth - Get Ready (1970)
- Joe Cocker - The Letter (1970)
- Rod Stewart - Maggie May (1971)
- Yes - Roundabout (1972)
- Derek and the Dominos - Layla (1972)
- Alice Cooper - School's Out (1972)
- Jethro Tull - Living in the Past (1972)
- The Doobie Brothers - Listen to the Music (1972)
- The Doobie Brothers - China Grove (1973)
- Grand Funk Railroad - We're an American Band (1973)
- The Allman Brothers Band - Ramblin' Man (1973)
- Lynyrd Skynyrd - Sweet Home Alabama (1974)
- Bachman-Turner Overdrive - You Ain't Seen Nothing Yet (1974)
- Electric Light Orchestra - Can't Get It out of My Head (1975)
- David Bowie - Fame (1975)
- Queen - Bohemian Rhapsody (1976)
- Aerosmith - Dream On (1976)
- Peter Frampton - Show Me the Way (1976)
- Peter Frampton - Baby, I Love Your Way (1976)
- Heart - Magic Man (1976)
- Steve Miller Band - Rock'n Me (1976)

=== The Rolling Stones (part 2) ===
- The Rolling Stones - Brown Sugar (1971)
- The Rolling Stones - Tumbling Dice (1972)
- The Rolling Stones - Happy (1972)
- The Rolling Stones - Angie (1973)
- The Rolling Stones - Heartbreaker (1974)
- The Rolling Stones - It's Only Rock & Roll (But I Like It) (1974)
- The Rolling Stones - "Ain't Too Proud to Beg" (1974)
- The Rolling Stones - Fool to Cry (1976)
- The Rolling Stones montage from their best selling LP's

==== Live ====
- The Rolling Stones Live - Jumpin' Jack Flash (1968)
- The Rolling Stones Live - Sympathy for the Devil (1973)
- The Rolling Stones Live - You Can't Always Get What You Want (1969)
- The Rolling Stones Live - Street Fighting Man (1989)
- The Rolling Stones Live - Hot Stuff (1976)

=== Paul McCartney and Wings ===
- Paul McCartney - Another Day (1971)
- Paul McCartney - Uncle Albert / Admiral Halsey (1971)
- Paul McCartney & Wings - Hi, Hi, Hi (1972)
- Paul McCartney & Wings - My Love (1973)
- Paul McCartney & Wings - Live and Let Die (1973)
- Paul McCartney & Wings - Helen Wheels (1973)
- Paul McCartney & Wings - Jet (1974)
- Paul McCartney & Wings - Band on the Run (1974)
- Paul McCartney & Wings - Junior's Farm (1974)
- Paul McCartney & Wings - Listen to What the Man Said (1975)
- Paul McCartney & Wings - Let 'Em In (1976)
- Paul McCartney & Wings - Silly Love Songs (1976)

=== Stevie Wonder ===
- Stevie Wonder - Fingertips, Part 2 (1963)
- Stevie Wonder - "Uptight (Everything's Alright)" (1965)
- Stevie Wonder - A Place in the Sun (1966)
- Stevie Wonder - I Was Made to Love Her (1967)
- Stevie Wonder - For Once in My Life (1968)
- Stevie Wonder - Signed, Sealed, Delivered, I'm Yours (1970)
- Stevie Wonder - If You Really Love Me (1971)
- Stevie Wonder - Superstition (1972)
- Stevie Wonder - You Are the Sunshine of My Life (1973)
- Stevie Wonder - Living for the City (1973)
- Stevie Wonder - Boogie on Reggae Woman (1975)
- Stevie Wonder - I Wish (1977)
- Stevie Wonder - Sir Duke (1977)

=== Elton John ===
- Elton John - Your Song (1970)
- Elton John - Friends (1971)
- Elton John - Levon (1971)
- Elton John - Rocket Man (1972)
- Elton John - Honky Cat (1972)
- Elton John - Crocodile Rock (1972)
- Elton John - Daniel (1973)
- Elton John - Saturday Night's Alright for Fighting (1973)
- Elton John - Goodbye Yellow Brick Road (1973)
- Elton John - Bennie and the Jets (1974)
- Elton John - Don't Let the Sun Go Down on Me (1974)
- Elton John - The Bitch Is Back (1974)
- Elton John - Lucy in the Sky with The Diamonds (1974)
- Elton John - Pinball Wizard (1975)
- Elton John - Philadelphia Freedom (1975)
- Elton John - Someone Saved My Life Tonight (1975)
- Elton John - Island Girl (1975)
- Elton John & Kiki Dee - Don't Go Breaking My Heart (1976)
- Elton John - Sorry Seems to Be the Hardest Word (1976)
- Elton John - Funeral for a Friend/Love Lies Bleeding in My Hands (1973)

=== Fleetwood Mac ===
- Fleetwood Mac - Over My Head (1976)
- Fleetwood Mac - Rhiannon (1976)
- Fleetwood Mac - Say You Love Me (1976)
- Fleetwood Mac - Go Your Own Way (1977)
- Fleetwood Mac - Dreams (1977)
- Fleetwood Mac - Don't Stop (1977)
- Fleetwood Mac - You Make Loving Fun (1977)

=== Linda Ronstadt ===
- Linda Ronstadt Featuring the Stone Ponies - Different Drum (1967)
- Linda Ronstadt - You're No Good (1975)
- Linda Ronstadt - When Will I Be Loved? (1975)
- Linda Ronstadt - Tracks of My Tears (1976)
- Linda Ronstadt - That'll Be the Day (1976)
- Linda Ronstadt - Blue Bayou (1977)
- Linda Ronstadt - It's So Easy (1977)

=== Eagles ===
- Eagles - Take It Easy (1972)
- Eagles - Witchy Woman (1972)
- Eagles - Peaceful Easy Feeling (1973)
- Eagles - Best of My Love (1975)
- Eagles - One of These Nights (1975)
- Eagles - Lyin' Eyes (1975)
- Eagles - Take It to the Limit (1976)
- Eagles - New Kid in Town (1977)
- Eagles - Hotel California (1977)
- Eagles - Life in the Fast Lane (1977)

== A Top Ten of Rock & Roll ==
- Bill Haley & His Comets - (We're Gonna) Rock Around the Clock (1955)
- Elvis Presley - Heartbreak Hotel (1956)
- Chubby Checker - The Twist (1960)
- Bob Dylan - Like a Rolling Stone (1965)
- The Rolling Stones - (I Can't Get No) Satisfaction (1965)
- Marvin Gaye - I Heard It Through the Grapevine (1968)
- The Beatles - Hey Jude (1968)
- Simon & Garfunkel - Bridge over Troubled Water (1970)
- Led Zeppelin - Stairway to Heaven (1972)
- Stevie Wonder - Superstition (1972)

== Ending Time Sweep ==
The "time sweep" is a 53-minute collage of number one hits from the Rock & Roll era. The original 1969 History of Rock and Roll timesweep closed with the final measures of the Beatles' "A Day in the Life". The revised 1978 version ended with Debby Boone's "You Light Up My Life" (the number one song at the time that version was being prepared), while the 1981 version ended with 1981's "I Love a Rainy Night" (Eddie Rabbitt), followed by The Beatles' version of "Rock and Roll Music".
