= Frank Nicotero =

American comedian

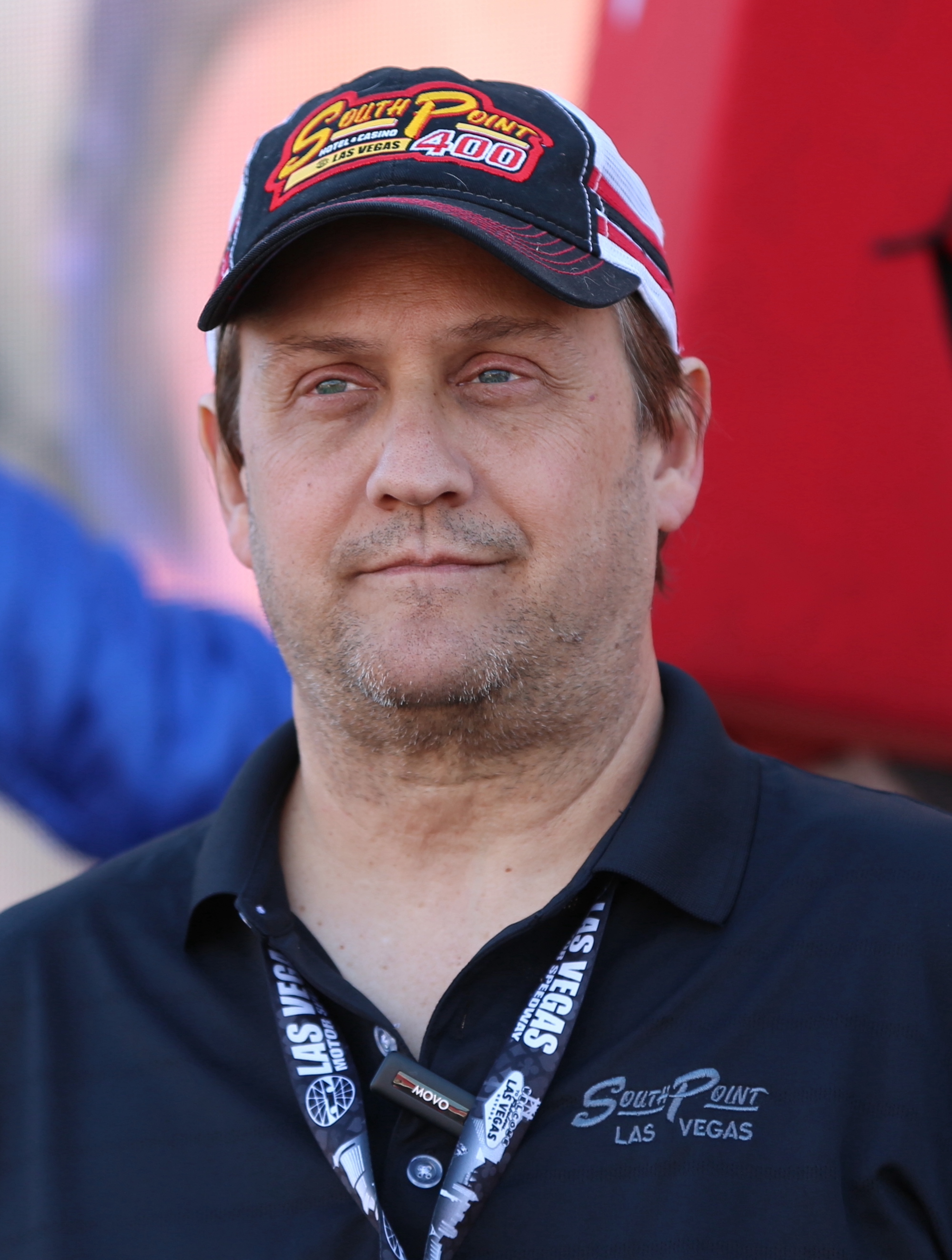
- Nicotero at Las Vegas Motor Speedway in 2024
- Born: Frank Joseph Nicotero; Pittsburgh, Pennsylvania
- Relatives: Greg Nicotero (cousin)
- Website: http://franknicotero.net

Frank Joseph Nicotero is an American stand-up comedian, television writer, and television host. He is best known for hosting the game show Street Smarts, which aired in syndication from 2000 to 2005.

== Career ==
Frank Nicotero got his start in Pittsburgh doing stand up, quickly finding success when he landed his first stand-up gig at Pittsburgh's famed Funny Bone comedy club in 1988. Shortly afterward, he toured college circuits, appearing with other comedians including Drew Carey, Adam Sandler, and Rob Schneider—and appearing at more than 300 colleges and clubs throughout the country. He has been a regular for over 10 years at The World Famous Laugh Factory on the Sunset Strip. He is also a regular at The Icehouse in Pasadena and The Comedy Magic Club in Hermosa Beach, California.

In 1996, Nicotero appeared as a contestant on the game shows Debt and Ultimate Fan League, winning over $14,000 cash on the former. This led to him being auditioned by several game show producers to host television pilots, one of which was a bowling game show co-hosted by Pat Sajak. From this, Nicotero also found roles in writing and production for other game shows as well. This included writing for Peer Pressure and Outrageous, in addition to writing and producing Faux Pause on Game Show Network. Nicotero's longest-tenured role was the host of the game show Street Smarts, which aired in syndication from 2000 to 2005.

Nicotero has co-hosted The Sharon Osbourne Show and has appeared as a guest on The Wayne Brady Show, The Rosie O'Donnell Show, FSN's The Sports List, Jury Duty, and the comedy game shows Make Me Laugh and Comedy on the Road. In December 2008, Frank was the voice over announcer for NBC’s Funniest Christmas Moments Special.

In 2011, he hosted a kids show on The Hub called The Game of Life based on the board game. He also was chosen as the second voiceover for TruTV's It Only Hurts When I Laugh, replacing Thom Kikot. In 2012, Frank went on the road with The X Factor as the emcee for all the try-out shows. He was considered as a host for the show. In 2013, he hosted Win, Lose or Pawn, a CMT game show set in a pawn shop. In 2015, he hosted another CMT game show, Pontoon Payday.

Frank’s most recent work is his starring role in the AMC’s streaming service Shudder’s season 2 Christmas Special of Creepshow.

== Filmography ==
Film and television appearances by Frank Nicotero
Title	Year	Role
Faux Pause	1998-99	Producer, writer
Street Smarts	2000-2005	Host
Primetime in No Time	2008-2011	Host
The Game of Life	2011-2012	Host
Pontoon Payday	2015	Host
