= Trilon =

Three-faceted prism-shaped object used in billboards

Example of a trilon.

A trilon is a three-faceted prism-shaped object.

A trilon can be made to rotate on an axle to show different text or images which may be applied to any of its three facets. Trilons have been used on billboards, variable-message signs. and in game shows.

== Signage ==
Trilons have been used in roadside billboards and variable-message signs. Particularly in billboards, many long, thin trilons are placed side-by-side in the frame and periodically rotate simultaneously to cycle the billboard through three separate signs, although many have been replaced by dot-matrix signs capable of displaying a much wider range of messages.

== Game shows ==
The game board on the original Concentration may have been the first use of trilons on a game show. The game combined the card game with a rebus puzzle. The original game board consisted of 30 motorized trilons. One facet of each trilon had an identifying number. A description of a prize or other game element was on a second facet, and a portion of a rebus was on the third facet. The rebus was gradually revealed as the game progressed. Puzzle pieces were kept under high security and were attached to the trilons only as needed.

Trilons became a common element on many other game (and reality) shows including:

- Three on a Match, which used a board with three columns of four trilons each, but unlike Concentration, these trilons rotated vertically rather than horizontally.
- Several incarnations of the Pyramid series (exceptions were the main game board in 1990 and all boards in the 2002 and 2012 versions).
- The main game in the game show Whew!
- The first season of Street Smarts.
- The spaces on the letter board in Wheel of Fortune were trilons until 1997.
- The entire game board on the original Family Feud was one large trilon through 1994.
- The board used in the Hidden Pictures rounds on the syndicated version of the Nickelodeon game show Finders Keepers.
- The "Jailtime Challenge" round of Where in the World Is Carmen Sandiego? used a game board with 15 trilons that, like those on Three on a Match, rotated vertically.
- The game show Debt had a game board with thirty trilons during its first season.
- Several pricing games featured in The Price Is Right, such as Bargain Game, Hot Seat and One Away.
- The live competitions on the American version of Big Brother.

Mechanically speaking, trilons had a penchant for being temperamental, labor-intensive, and very noisy. They were largely replaced by on-set television monitors, as on Jeopardy! (starting with the 1984 revival, although pull-cards were used instead of trilons to show the categories until 1991). They were replaced by a CGI game board on the 1987 "Classic" revival of Concentration and Family Feud (starting with the 1999 revival).
