= Street Smarts =

American Game Show

- Genre: Game show
- Presented by: Frank Nicotero
- Country of origin: United States
- Original language: English
- No. of seasons: 5

Production
- Running time: approx. 22 minutes
- Production companies: AND Syndicated Productions; Entertain the Brutes (2000–2003) (seasons 1–3); Telepictures Productions

Original release
- Network: Syndicated
- Release: October 2, 2000 – May 25, 2005

Street Smarts is an American game show that featured two in-studio contestants trying to predict the outcome of interviews of people who were found on the street. The show, which was hosted by Frank Nicotero, aired in syndication from 2000 to 2005. Nicotero would be on locale (via archived footage) with the on the street contestants, virtually any and everywhere in the United States. The in studio gameplay however, was at G4 and TMZ, headquarters, Victory Studios, in Glendale, California.

== Format ==
The show features two in-studio contestants competing against each other; and three voluntary "on the street" contestants/participants, (who were approached to be on the program in an unsuspecting manner, and who were also generally referred to as "savants" by Nicotero), who are civilians, situated in a popular outdoor metropolis area, in which the "savants" are featured via archived, prior pre-recorded vox populi interviews moderated by Nicotero. The "savants" are presented through large projection screens in the studio (and the archival footage of them will be shown in studio, and to the home audience, throughout the program).

The "savants" were usually almost always, at a populous party event, festival, happening, social gathering, or function, (some "savants" also were on vacation, on holiday, or were out-of-towners, or tourists). This aspect was probably done to take the "savants" out of their element, making incorrect responses likely to happen based on the current situation. Nicotero would also constantly soft talk, sweet talk, flatter himself, use sarcasm, and tease with the "savants", making the trivia questions he asked, come across off guard to the "savants", leading the "savants", to possibly misunderstand what Nicotero intentionally meant, and also possible unpredictable comedic responses.

The in-studio contestants are revealed to the audience. The three "savants" are also revealed, and they describe themselves to the audience (through archival footage shown in-studio, and to the home audience.)

Realistically based only on impressions given by the "savants" to the in-studio contestants, the in-studio contestants must predict whether the "savants" gave a correct or incorrect answer, based on general knowledge and pop culture questions, exclaimed by Nicotero to the "savants."

Occasionally, the "savants", were given a sign, with a picture of a celebrity on it, and asked to name whom this person was, also the "savants" were given a large sign with the name of a word, in which the "savant" was asked to pronounce the word, or explain the definition of the word. The "savants", may also be asked to make gestures, or signals, in response to a question as well.

=== Round One ("Who Knew It?") ===
A question is posed, and the studio contestants must predict which of the three "savants" gave the correct answer. A correct prediction earns $100. Three questions are asked in this round, and sometimes two "savants" will have answered a question correctly. Sometimes, as an aside, Nicotero will call for a wrong-answer clip to be played, to add humor to the show.

In-studio contestants are allowed to pick the same "savant", if they wish.

=== Round Two ("Who Blew It?") ===
At the start of this round, before gameplay, Nicotero would interview the in-studio contestants, with the in-studio contestants, usually revealing something unique or special about them.

This round, is similar to the first round, but the object is to predict which "savant", gave an incorrect response; for each question, only two of the "savants" are considered (one of whom answered correctly), and correct predictions are now worth $200.

Like in the first round, in-studio contestants, may wish to pick the same "savant".

Also, a Dunce Cap is in play in Round Two; Once the question is posed, an in-studio contestant can hit their dunce buzzer, if he/she thinks that his/her opponent does not know the answer. (The in-studio contestant that wishes to "dunce" the other contestant, can hit the dunce buzzer during anytime Nicotero is speaking and presenting the question; however, the in-studio contestant that was "dunced", will be given the question in its entirety.) The contestant who hit the "dunce" buzzer, (or if both contestants hit the "dunce" buzzer, whoever hit it first) usually placed the Dunce Cap on the contestant who was "dunced". The in-studio contestant that was "dunced", must then answer the question within 5 seconds. If the contestant gets the question wrong, $200 goes to the contestant who hit the "dunce" buzzer. However, if the dunce does know the answer, then the contestant who was "dunced" gets the $200, and is allowed to place the dunce cap on the contestant, who hit the buzzer originally. In either case, the cap must be worn for the remainder of the round. Also, only one dunce cap opportunity is available.

=== Round Three ("Pick Your Pony/Brain") ===
The third round saw the two contestants choose one of the "savants" to work with for the entire round. The round was known as "Pick Your Pony" for the first three seasons and "Pick Your Brain" in the final two seasons. The in-studio contestants must each choose a different "savant." The in-studio contestant that had the lower score, (or if scores were tied, the in-studio contestant that won the "preliminary tiebreaker",) has priority in choosing which "savant" they want. The other in-studio contestant then made a choice from the remaining "savants". The third "savant" that was not chosen, is absent for this round.

Unlike in the first two rounds, the in-studio contestants do not have free roam on deciding which "savant" to predict what their response will be. The in-studio contestants, are tied to only that "savant" they chose priorly.

Also unlike the previous rounds, in which all "savants" were asked the identical question, Nicotero asked oblique individual questions to the "savants", and each in-studio contestant, were given a separate individual question, for the "savant" they chose.

The in-studio contestants must predict, whether the "savant" they chose, gave a correct, or incorrect answer. Three questions are asked of each contestant, for a total of six in the round. Correct predictions are now worth $300. The Dunce Cap is back in this round, regardless of whether or not it was used in the previous round. Once again there is one dunce per round, but dunces are now worth $300.

The "right" reference is indicated in green; the "wrong" reference in red.

=== Final Round ("One Final Question/Wager of Death") ===
Before the final commercial break, Nicotero, revealed the final question he asked to each of the three "savants" he interviewed. This question was remarkably always usually an obscure slang question, or a trick and/or indirect question, in which the chances of someone giving a correct or incorrect response, were equal.

During the commercial, the contestants each choose, in secret, 1) which "savant" they wish to pick, 2) whether they got the question right or wrong, and 3) the amount of their score that they wish to wager. A correct prediction adds the contestant's wager to his/her score, while an incorrect prediction loses the wager. High scorer at the end of the game keeps their money, and, in season 5, has the opportunity to risk their winnings for the possibility of a slot in the season-ending Tournament of Champions (see below). An exception to this rule occurs when celebrities play for charity: the winning player's charity receives the money won, with a minimum of $1,000; the losing player's charity receives $500, regardless of the actual score.

The contestants may pick the same "savant". The "savants" that were not chosen, are absent for this round. During the credits roll, the answer to the "Wager of Death" question, from the "savants" not picked, regardless if they gave a correct, or incorrect response, were shown to the audience.

The theoretical maximum win on Street Smarts was $4,600, this required getting all predictions right, an all-in bet on the "Wager of Death," and winning both "Dunces."

=== Tiebreaker ===
If the game ended in a tie at more than $0, one final question was asked to both studio contestants. The first player to buzz-in chooses to either answer the question or pass it to his/her opponent. If the buzzing player chooses to answer, he or she must answer based on the information given to that point; if he or she passes, the other player is allowed to hear the entire question. A correct answer by the responding contestant wins the game; answering incorrectly awards the game to their opponent. The tiebreaker only takes place if the players have money; if both players have $0, then the game is over and nobody wins.

In all celebrity episodes, the game ends in a tie and both charities receive the same amount.

=== Set design ===
For the first season of Street Smarts, the contestants sat in chairs and recorded their answers in the first two rounds using a mechanical trilon and a Right/Wrong paddle for the "Pick Your Pony" round. For the Wager of Death, the contestants would write their wagers, their chosen savants and predictions down on writable flip cards. Meanwhile, television screens positioned next to their chairs would show the score.

Beginning in season two and continuing for the remainder of the series, the contestants stood behind a desk for the whole show and recorded their answers by way of pushing buttons.

== The $100,000 Tournament ==
To celebrate the series being the first street-interview show in 20 years to be renewed for a fifth season, Street Smarts offered its winning contestants an opportunity to compete for $100,000 in a season-ending, single-elimination tournament for what proved to be its final season. On each episode the winning contestant was given the choice to either take whatever money he/she had won and leave, or forfeit the money and receive a spot in the tournament instead. Thirty-two contestants elected to give back their winnings to take the chance at winning $100,000.

The tournament took place over the final thirty-one episodes of the season, and each game was played for points instead of money. The first sixteen episodes comprised the first round, referred to as "The Thunderous 32" on air. The winners of those episodes advanced to the second round, consisting of eight episodes and called "The Savvy 16". The eight winners from those episodes advanced to the third round, consisting of four episodes and called "The Great 8". The winners would face off in the last two episodes before the final, called "The 'Phat' 4", and the winners of those two games faced off in the final match, referred to as "The Six-Figure Showdown", for the $100,000 grand prize.

The tournament concluded on May 25, 2005, with Teresa Lee winning the final match and the $100,000. The tournament final also served as the final episode of Street Smarts (as the series was not renewed for the 2005–06 season), and reruns continued until September 23, 2005.

== International versions ==
| Country | Local name | Host | Channel | Year aired |
|---|---|---|---|---|
| Canada (French) | Les Beaux Parleurs | Patrice L'Écuyer | Radio-Canada | 2001–2002 |
| Germany | Strohleins Experten | Marco Ströhlein | Sat.1 | 2002–2003 |
| Germany | Strassenstars | Roberto Cappelluti | HR-fernsehen | 2004–2026 |
| United Kingdom | Does Doug Know? | Daisy Donovan | Channel 4 | 2002 |
| United States | Street Smarts | Frank Nicotero | Syndication | 2000–2005 |

== Reruns/syndication ==
Reruns of the show have aired in the past on both WGN America and Game Show Network. On March 22, 2021, an official Street Smarts channel was launched on YouTube.
