= Pete Johnson (rock critic) =

Music critic for the Los Angeles Times

Pete Johnson was a music critic for the Los Angeles Times in the 1960s before being replaced by Robert Hilburn in 1970. In 1969, he wrote The History of Rock and Roll and appeared in another rockumentary, the Pop Chronicles.

In writing The History of Rock and Roll documentary, Johnson said: "I included nearly every record I ever rem[em]ber hearing".

After his work at Los Angeles Times, Johnson was editorial director of Circular, a promotional magazine published by Warner Bros.

== Sample reviews ==
- The Doors
- The Grateful Dead
- Steve Winwood
- The Band
