= Wink Martindale =

American DJ and television personality (1933–2025)

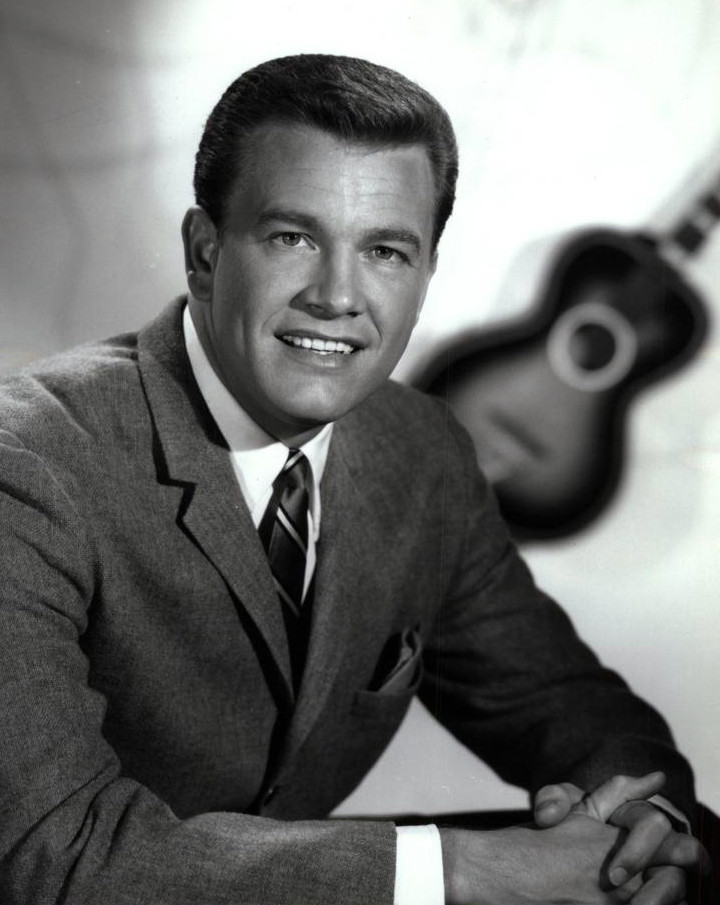
- Martindale in a 1964 publicity photo
- Born: Winston Conrad Martindale; December 4, 1933; Jackson, Tennessee, U.S.
- Died: April 15, 2025 (aged 91); Rancho Mirage, California, U.S.
- Occupations: Disc jockey; radio personality; game show host; television producer
- Years active: 1951–2025
- Spouses: Madelyn Leech (m. 1954; div. 1971) Sandy Ferra (m. 1975)
- Children: 4

Winston Conrad "Wink" Martindale (December 4, 1933 – April 15, 2025) was an American disc jockey, radio personality, game show host and television producer. Regarded as a pop culture icon, he was known for his outgoing and jovial demeanor and his booming voice, who was also well-known for hosting the game shows: Gambit from 1972 to 1976 (and again from 1980 to 1981), Tic-Tac-Dough from 1978 to 1985, High Rollers from 1987 to 1988, and Debt from 1996 to 1998. He also presented Wink's Vault, on his YouTube Channel, from 2014 until his death in 2025.

== Early life ==
Winston Conrad Martindale was born on December 4, 1933, in Jackson, Tennessee. His mother, Frances Mae (née Mitchell; 1901–1986), was a housewife, and his father, James ("Auzie") Martindale (1901–1969), was a lumber inspector. He was the fourth of five children: James Kenneth Martindale (1925–2017), Edward Leo Martindale (1927–2003), Frances Geraldine King (1930–2025), and David Lynn Martindale (1943–1990).

Martindale grew up in humble circumstances in a deeply religious household. When speaking of his childhood, Martindale said that "There were five of us in our small house, and my three brothers, one sister, and I lived with our parents in a two-bedroom, one-bath house with no shower. All of our water had to be heated. We poured water into a tub to take a bath. My parents bought our groceries on credit at Woody's Grocery Store. We used to go to church every Sunday morning and evening and on Wednesday nights we went to Bible study. When school was out in the summer, we attended Vacation Bible School."

For a child his age, Martindale had a distinctive voice, although his mother was the opposite of that. His mother had wanted him to become a minister. She believed he had the perfect voice for it and he was also a frequent churchgoer. Martindale said that a person could only become a minister if he heard a calling, and would later admit to his minister that he wasn't called for the ministry. Martindale then said: "When I was a boy growing up in Tennessee, my mother, God bless her, always wanted me to be a preacher. She'd say, 'Son, with your voice, I think God intended you to do work in the ministry.' It took me years to convince mother that you don't just become a preacher. You have to be called to the ministry. She finally accepted that, though it took years. So when I got the preacher job on 'B&B' I thought, 'Mom would be so proud.'" Martindale got his nickname "Wink" after he shortened it from Winston to Winkie after his childhood friend had trouble pronouncing his first name (Martindale would ultimately shorten it again to "Wink" later in life).

== Career ==
=== Radio ===
Martindale started his career as a disc jockey, when he was 17 at WPLI in Jackson, earning $25 a week. After moving to WTJS, he was hired away for double the salary by Jackson's only other station, WDXI. Next, he hosted mornings at WHBQ in Memphis while a college student at Memphis State University, before graduating with a bachelor of science degree in 1957. While at Memphis State, Martindale was a member of Kappa Sigma fraternity.

On the evening of July 10, 1954, Martindale was showing the WHBQ studio to some friends when he realized that his colleague on the 9 p.m. to midnight shift, Dewey Phillips, was getting a large number of reactions from listeners after airing a new song. The song was Elvis Presley's first record, "That's All Right". The song was recorded at Sam Phillips' recording studio on the evening of July 5, 1954. Phillips, who had brought the record on July 6, was in the WHBQ studio on the first airing night and had Presley's telephone number. DJ Dewey Phillips wanted to interview Elvis during his program, so Martindale endeavored to contact Presley, but Gladys Presley, Elvis's mother, answered the phone and said Elvis was so nervous that he had gone to a movie theater. Gladys and her husband Vernon brought Elvis to WHBQ and Dewey interviewed Elvis without his knowing that he was on the air (Martindale reported that Elvis later admitted that he would have been unable to talk otherwise).

Martindale's rendition of the spoken-word song "Deck of Cards" went to No. 7 on the Billboard Hot 100 chart and sold over a million copies in 1959. In Canada it reached No. 3. It also peaked at No. 5 in the UK Singles Chart in April 1963, one of four visits to that chart. It was followed by "Black Land Farmer". In 1959, he became morning man at KHJ in Los Angeles, California, moving a year later to the morning show at KRLA and finally to KFWB in 1962. He also had lengthy stays at KGIL (AM) from 1968 to 1971, KKGO-FM/KJQI, and Gene Autry's KMPC (now KSPN-AM) from 1971 to 1979 and again from 1983 to 1987, the short-lived Wink and Bill Show on KABC during 1989, and KJQI from 1993 to 1994. In 1967, Martindale acted in a short futuristic documentary film about home life in the year 1999 produced by the Philco-Ford Corporation which predicted, among other things, Internet commerce.

In 2026, Martindale was inducted into the Radio Hall of Fame in the "Legends" category.

=== Television ===
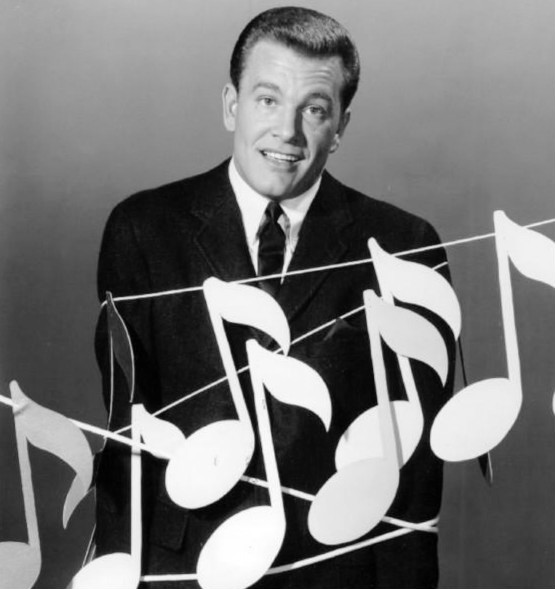
Martindale in 1964, as the host of What's This Song?

Martindale's first break into television was at WHBQ-TV in Memphis, as the host of Mars Patrol, a science-fiction themed children's television series. At his tenure with WHBQ, he became the host of the teenage TV show Dance Party (1955–1959), where his friend Elvis Presley made an appearance on June 16, 1956. Following Presley's death in 1977, Martindale aired a nationwide tribute radio special in his honor.

Martindale's first game-show hosting job was on the show What's This Song?, which he hosted for NBC (credited as "Win Martindale") from 1964 to 1965. From 1970 to 1971, he hosted a similar song-recognition game show, Words and Music, again on NBC. His first major success came in 1972, when he took the emcee position on a new CBS game show, Gambit. He spent four years hosting the original Gambit and later hosted a Las Vegas–based revival for 13 months in 1980–81. Martindale said in 2000, in his memoir, Winking at Life: "From the day it hit the air, Gambit spelled winner, and it taught me a basic tenant [sic] of any truly successful game show: Kiss! Keep It Simple Stupid," he added: "Like playing Old Maids as a kid, everybody knows how to play 21, i.e. blackjack."

The emcee role for which Martindale is most widely known is on Tic-Tac-Dough. He was tapped by Barry & Enright Productions to host the revived series in 1978 and stayed until 1985, presiding over one of the more popular game shows of the day. Coincidentally, Martindale died one day after the revival of Tic-Tac-Dough premiered on Game Show Network, which occurred on April 14, 2025. While hosting Tic-Tac-Dough, Martindale (along with fellow game show hosts Art James, Jack Clark, and Jim Perry) made a cameo appearance in the 1980 TV movie The Great American Traffic Jam in a scene where the quartet played golf. During that time, Martindale decided to branch out and form his own production company, Wink Martindale Enterprises, so he could develop and produce his own game shows. His first venture was Headline Chasers, a co-production with Merv Griffin that premiered in 1985; Martindale had left Tic-Tac-Dough to host his creation, but the show did not meet with any success and was cancelled after its only season in 1986. Martindale's next venture was more successful, as he created and, along with Barry & Enright, co-produced the Canadian game show Bumper Stumpers for Global Television Network and USA Network. This series aired on both American and Canadian television from 1987 until 1990. In 1986, he launched a partnership with producer Jerry Gilden, Martindale/Gilden Productions, and it started off with a game show development contract with CBS. In 1988, Martindale/Gilden Productions secured the licensing rights from Parker Brothers to develop game shows based on Parker-owned properties such as Boggle.

After hosting two short-lived Merrill Heatter-produced game shows (a revival of High Rollers and the Canadian The Last Word), Martindale went back into producing and launched The Great Getaway Game on Travel Channel in 1990. Two years after that program went off the air, Martindale teamed up with Bill Hillier and The Family Channel to produce a series of "interactive" game shows that put an emphasis on home viewers being able to play along from home and win prizes. Four series were commissioned and Martindale served as host for all four. The first to premiere, on June 7, 1993, was Trivial Pursuit, an adaptation of the popular trivia-based board game. On March 7, 1994, the list-based Shuffle and Boggle, another board-game adaptation, premiered and were very different from Trivial Pursuit, which was presented more in a traditional game-show style. These two programs, along with the Jumble-based show that replaced Shuffle on June 13, 1994, after its initial 14-week run ended, were played more like the interactive games for the home viewers that were the focus of the block. Except for Trivial Pursuit, none of the interactive games were much of a success; Boggle ended on November 18, 1994, while Jumble came to an end on December 30, 1994. Trivial Pursuit ended on the same day as Jumble, but continued to air in reruns for some time afterward, finally being removed from the Family Channel schedule in July 1995.

In June 1996, Martindale's last successful, yet short-lived run, when he became host of Lifetime's highest-rated quiz show, Debt, which had debt-ridden contestants compete to try to eliminate their debts, he was the producer's, Michael Davies's, first choice and he accepted it. He said in 1996, about the show that was supposed to be a promising, long run, for the network: "Essentially, it's a 21st-century version of Jeopardy for the MTV crowd, and will focus on pop culture. Young people will be the contestants, and if they win, they'll be able to wipe out their credit-card debt," he said. "Disney promised this will do for me what MTV did for Tony Bennett, and I'm going to hold them to it." When his show won a CableACE Award, Martindale said, the following year, in 1997: "What a concept," He also added: "We help the contestants pay for the goodies they've already gone out and bought." Despite its popularity on cable, Debt was cancelled in 1998, for the reason more males were watching the show than females (the network's target audience). In a 2018 interview, Martindale said about Debt being sued by the creator of Jeopardy!, despite being the success of the show, on cable television, at the end of the first year, before the second show was different than the one, before it: "That first season of Debt was terrific. The colors on the set matched the colors on a Visa card and after that first season, Visa made us change the colors. We also received a complaint from Merv Griffin Productions that some of our questions and answers were too much like those on Jeopardy! They sued us and won. We had to change the way the game was played—it never was the same, and the ratings showed it. So after two seasons, unfortunately, Debt went by the wayside. But it was a terrific show." Martindale did not host another game show for over a decade.

=== Film ===
- Year 1999 A.D. (1967) – as Mike

=== Later career ===
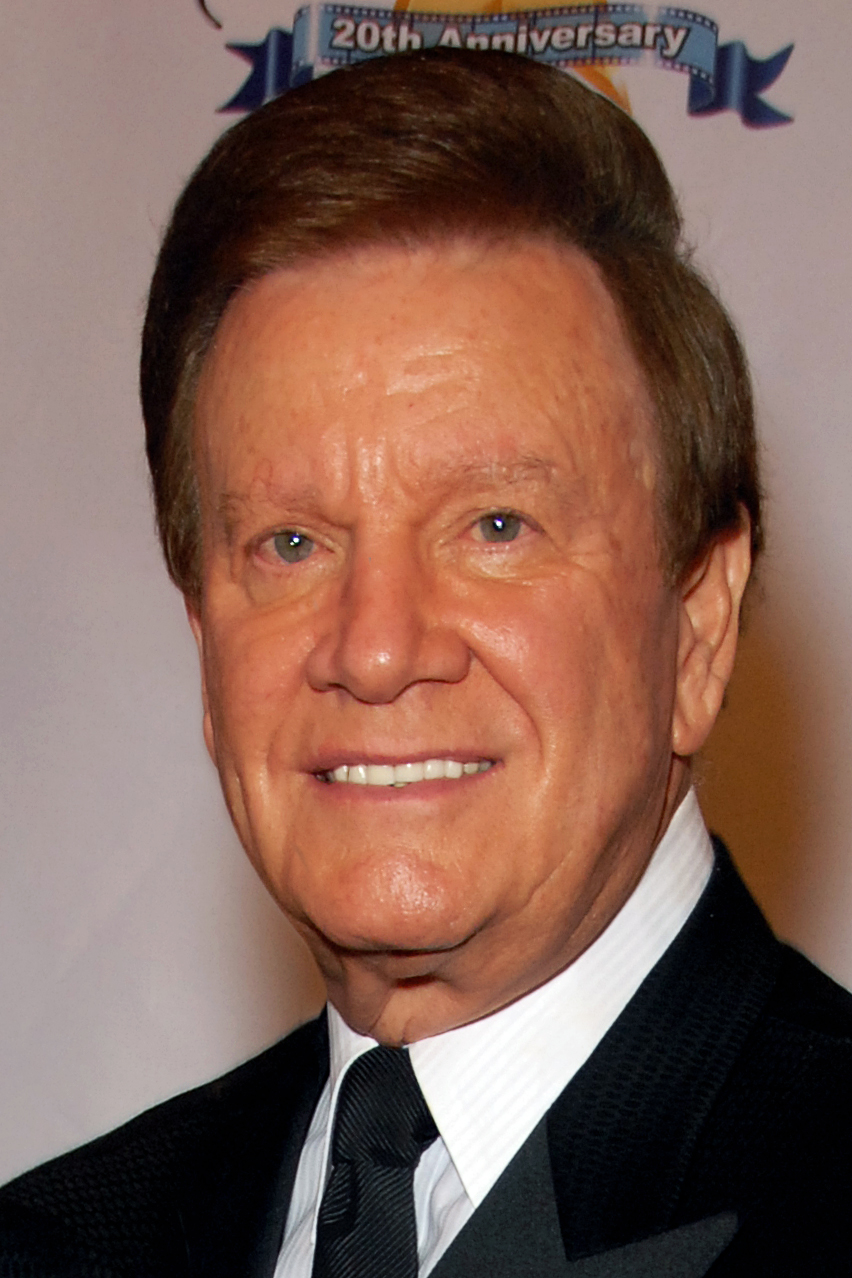
Martindale attending the "Night of 100 Stars" for the 82nd Academy Awards viewing party in March 2010

On June 2, 2006, Martindale received a star on the Hollywood Walk of Fame. In 2007, he became a member of the nominating committee of the Hit Parade Hall of Fame. On October 13, 2007, Martindale was one of the first inductees into the American TV Game Show Hall of Fame in Las Vegas. Martindale was one of the hosts featured in the 2002 NBC special Most Outrageous Game Show Moments, alongside Bob Eubanks, Jim Lange, Ben Stein, and Peter Marshall, but was not featured in any of the subsequent episodes ordered by the network.

Martindale appeared in various television commercials, including a stint as a pitchman for the travel website Orbitz. Until 2007, he had a daily three-hour show on the syndicated Music of Your Life format, which is heard on around 200 radio stations. On June 2, 2009, Martindale signed with the syndicated Hit Parade Radio format. The format began operation on February 7, 2010, with Martindale as afternoon drive personality. The syndicator stopped operating on June 6, 2010. In 2008, he appeared on GSN Live, an interstitial program during the afternoon block of classic game show reruns. Several times during 2008, Martindale filled in for Fred Roggin on GSN Live while Roggin was on vacation. Martindale's last program was the GSN original series Instant Recall, which premiered on March 4, 2010. Instant Recall was the first show Martindale hosted following Debt aired on Lifetime from 1996 to 1998. In 2012, Martindale returned to radio, as host of The 100 Greatest Christmas Hits of All Time. The nationally syndicated show is produced by Envision Radio Networks. In 2013, Martindale made a guest appearance on The Eric Andre Show; in an appearance typical for the show, he did the interview dressed in a motion-capture suit (at one point being, rather poorly, mocapped dancing), sang a song teaching kids their "Jamaican ABCs," and promoted a drinkable mouthwash, called Scoap (pronounced "sco-app").

In 2014, Martindale began a YouTube channel, featuring episodes of game shows, game show pilots, rare clips from various game shows, and other game show related content. He continued to maintain the channel, named "Wink's Vault", with episode B-128 of Martindale-hosted game show Debt being published less than two hours before his death; Martindale's assistants have continued operating the channel under the name "The Game Show Vault." He made a special guest appearance on the December 2, 2014, episode of the GSN show The Chase hosted by Brooke Burns and featuring Mark Labbett.

In October 2016, Martindale appeared on the daytime soap opera The Bold and the Beautiful, as a minister. On April 21, 2017, Martindale appeared in a KFC advertising campaign featuring Rob Lowe as astronaut Colonel Sanders making a JFK speech spoof and giving an homage; the ad is about launching a Zinger chicken sandwich into space. On April 4, 2018, Martindale was the "surprise co-host" (via phone) for SiriusXM NHL Network Radio's "Three Questions" segment, where a celebrity co-host creates the questions and then quizzes the show's broadcast crew.

On January 28, 2021, Martindale claimed on his Facebook page that he had one of the pilots for the ABC version of Deal or No Deal and would upload it when his YouTube channel hit 18,000 subscribers. When he hit his goal on July 19, 2021, the pilot was uploaded to his channel. On June 6, 2021, Martindale began hosting the nationally and internationally syndicated The History of Rock 'n' Roll, a two-hour weekend look back at music from the 1960s, 1970s, and 1980s. The production is created by a team composed of Martindale, producer/engineer Peter Jay Gould of The Intervale Group, and writer/producer Gary Theroux, who wrote and produced the 1978 52-hour marathon version of The History of Rock 'n' Roll for Drake-Chenault. The new richly produced series combines songs, fun facts about the music and the artists, and artist interview soundbites.

== Personal life ==
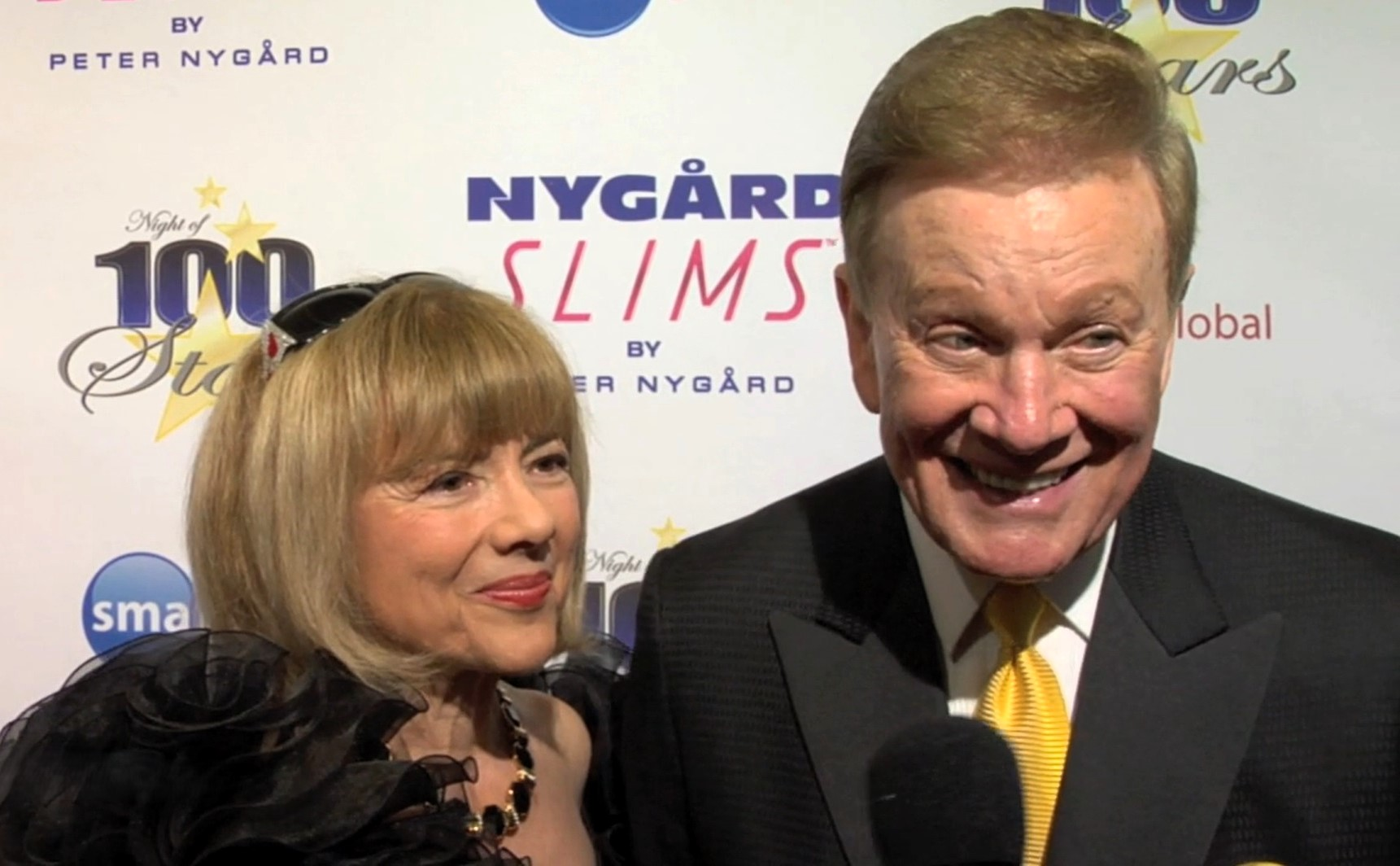
Martindale (right) with his wife Sandy at an Oscars viewing event at the Beverly Hlls Hilton in Beverly Hills, February 2015

Martindale married Madelyn Leech in 1954 and they had four children. The couple divorced in 1971. He later married his second wife, Sandy (née Ferra), in 1975. He had a few dogs named after the various game shows he hosted.

Martindale identified as a born-again Christian and was once a guest on the TBN flagship program Praise the Lord. He endorsed several conservative positions politically. His wife, Sandy, previously dated Elvis Presley. Both he and Sandy were friends with Presley. They appeared on Sirius' Elvis Radio and shared stories about Presley.

=== Death ===
Martindale died from lymphoma at a hospital in Rancho Mirage, California, on April 15, 2025, at the age of 91. A spokesperson said he'd been battling the disease for over a year, though Martindale chose to keep his illness private.

Media offices
Preceded by Jack Barry	Host of Tic-Tac-Dough; 1978–1985	Succeeded by Jim Caldwell
Preceded by Alex Trebek	Host of High Rollers; 1987–1988	Succeeded by Series ended
Preceded by Series created	Host of Trivial Pursuit; 1993–1994	Succeeded by Christopher Knight (2008–2009)
