= Robert Hilburn =

American journalist (born 1939)

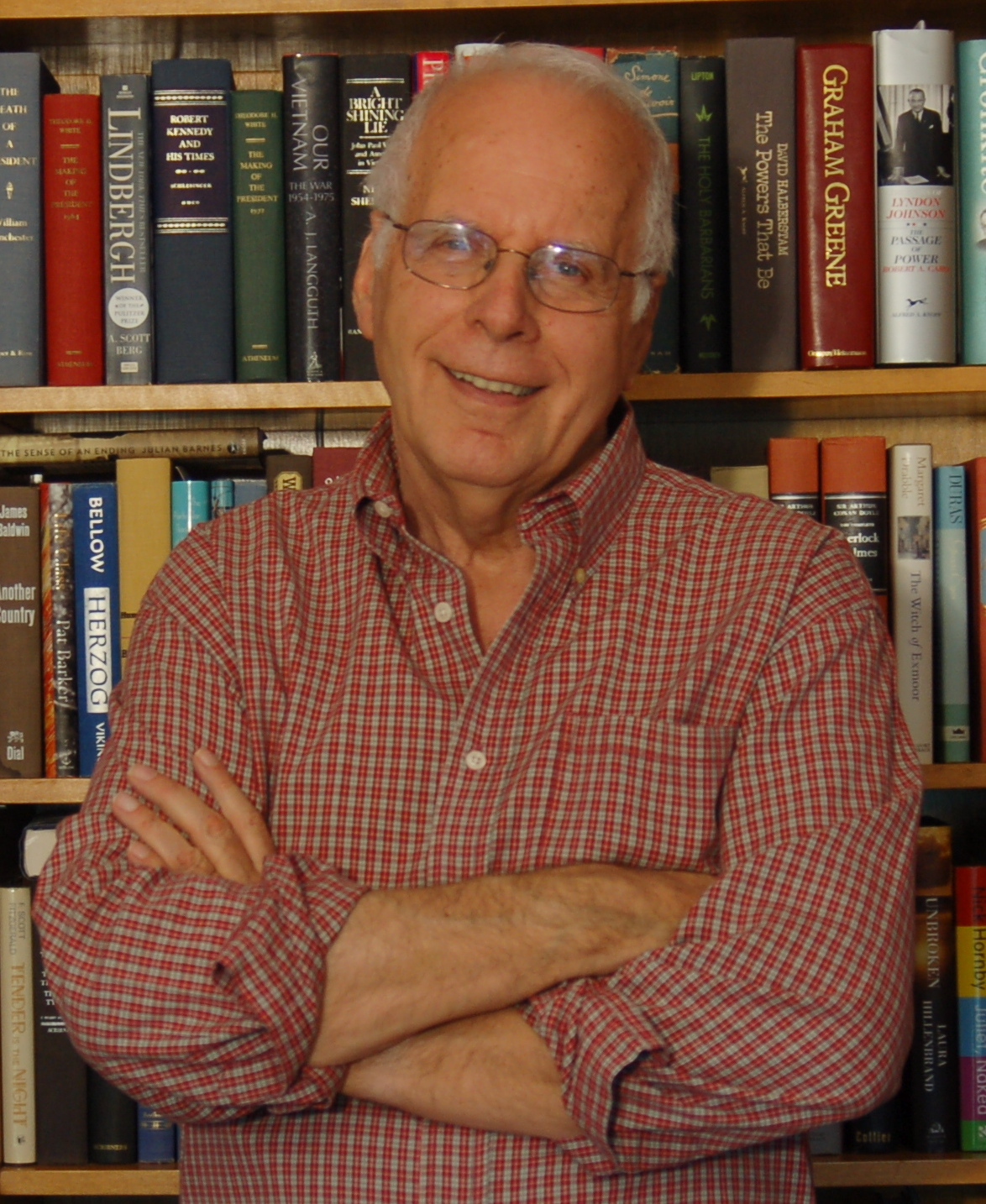
- Hilburn in front of his personal library in 2010
- Born: Charles Robert Nelms; September 25, 1939 (age 86); Natchitoches, Louisiana, U.S.
- Education: California State University, Northridge
- Occupations: Journalist; music critic; author; biographer
- Years active: 1966–present
- Spouses: Ruthann Snijders; Kathi Hilburn
- Children: 2
- Website: www.roberthilburnonline.com

Robert Hilburn (born September 25, 1939) is an American pop music critic, editor, author, and radio host. The chief pop music critic and pop music editor at the Los Angeles Times for more than 30 years, he has written five books, including a memoir and biographies of Johnny Cash, Paul Simon, Bruce Springsteen and Randy Newman.

== Early life and education ==
Hilburn was born Charles Robert Nelms in Natchitoches, Louisiana to Alice Marie Taylor, a homemaker, and Charles Merritte Nelms, who owned a Ford dealership. His parents' marriage was brief. Following their divorce, his mother married John Edward Hilburn, an Army lieutenant.

Hilburn lived in Natchitoches, mostly on his grandfather’s cotton farm in nearby Campti, until he was five. During those years, and when visiting his grandparents in later summers, he was exposed to the blues and country music styles that eventually gave birth to rock ‘n’ roll.

The family spent several years in Dallas before moving to Southern California, where John Edward Hilburn was an electronic engineer in the aerospace industry.

Hillburn attended Reseda High School. He graduated from California State University, Northridge with a degree in journalism in 1961.

== Career ==
=== 1966-2005: Early career, Los Angeles Times ===
Hilburn worked as a news reporter on a suburban Los Angeles newspaper, The Valley Times, in the early 1960s, and was later a public information officer for the Los Angeles Unified School District.

Eager to write about music, Hilburn began writing for the Los Angeles Times as a freelancer in 1966. He wrote a series of articles about artists including Johnny Cash and Janis Joplin for the paper before he was hired full-time, replacing Pete Johnson as rock critic in 1970. While at the Times, Hilburn accompanied several artists on landmark tours; he covered Elton John's inaugural visit to Russia, Paul Simon's Graceland tour stop in Zimbabwe; and Bob Dylan's first concerts in Israel. He spent a week on the road with the Sex Pistols during the British band's first U.S. tour. He was with Johnny Cash when he performed at Folsom Prison in 1968.

In addition to writing extensively about Dylan, Springsteen, David Bowie, and U2, Hilburn was an early champion of artists including John Prine, Patti Smith, the Eagles, Tom Petty, Prince, Elvis Costello, Guns N' Roses, Rage Against the Machine, Nine Inch Nails, Ice Cube, Public Enemy, Eminem, the White Stripes, Arcade Fire, and X. John credited Hilburn for helping to launch his career; U2, Prine, Springsteen, and Dr. Dre, among other artists, commented similarly.

Although credited with taking rock journalism to a "new, more serious frontier," Hilburn approached rock criticism as a fan; in a 2009 interview with the Washington Post, he said: “I thought the message of the artist was more important than the writing style...I tried to be clear, I wanted everyone to be welcome." In 2005 he accepted a buy-out package and retired from his staff position at the Times. He continued to write features for the paper.

While at the Los Angeles Times, Hilburn wrote Springsteen, his first biography.

=== 2006-present: Corn Flakes with John Lennon; Dylan, Simon, and Newman biographies; KSCN ===
In 2010, Hilburn's memoir, Corn Flakes with John Lennon, was published. It focused on the work and influence of John Lennon, Bob Dylan, Johnny Cash, Bruce Springsteen, Stevie Wonder, Phil Spector, Michael Jackson, U2, Kurt Cobain, and N.W.A. In a review of the book in The Austin Chronicle, Margaret Moser wrote: "It's not just that Hilburn has been there and gotten the tour T-shirt... Hilburn is the real thing writing about the real thing."

In 2013, Hilburn published a biography of Cash titled Johnny Cash: The Life. Michiko Kakutani, the chief book critic of The New York Times, named the biography one of her ten favorite books of the year. Kirkus called it "an instant-classic music biography with something to offer all generations of listeners."

After reading the Cash book, Paul Simon, who previously declined multiple offers to tell his story, sat for more than 100 hours of interviews with Hilburn. Published by Simon & Schuster in 2018, Hilburn's biography, Paul Simon: The Life, was described as "epic" in Rolling Stone. A four-star review in USA Today described the book as "a straight-shooting tour de force", noting Hilburn’s "reportorial skill" and "nuanced attention to the dynamics and the substance of Simon’s artistry."

Hilburn's A Few Words in Defense of Our Country: The Biography of Randy Newman, was published by Hachette in October 2024. Friends since they met at Newman's 1970 debut concert at the Troubadour, Hilburn wrote that Newman would become a "creative master." Despite their relationship, it took Hilburn some time to convince Newman to support the biography. In an interview with The Independent, Hilburn noted that despite Newman's success, he did not like to talk about his songs. Shy and introverted, Newman described songwriting as torture. "He always had to find what was important enough to say; he really wanted to truly explain his country." A Few Words in Defense of Our Country explored Newman's catalog of socially conscious songs that attacked what he saw as shortcomings in the American character, including racism, sexism and greed. An "immersive and satisfying" biography, it "clarifies the intentions underlying Newman's most challenging songs."

Hilburn, who lives in Los Angeles, hosts a weekly Wednesday evening music program, Rock 'n' Roll Times, on 885 The SoCal Sound, a public broadcasting radio station in Southern California.

== Bibliography ==
- Springsteen, Rolling Stone Press, January 1986; 256 pages; ISBN 0684187035
- Cornflakes with John Lennon and Other Tales from A Rock and Roll Life; Rodale Books, October 2010; 288 pages; ISBN 160529165X
- Johnny Cash: The Life, Orion Books, January 2013, 352 pages; ISBN 0297866583
- Paul Simon: The Life; Simon & Schuster; May 28, 2019; 448 pages;ISBN 9781501112133
- A Few Words in Defense of Our Country: The Biography of Randy Newman; Hachette Books; October 2024, 544 pages; ISBN 9780306834691
