= Gary Theroux =

American radio personality (1951–2025)

Gary Theroux (October 2, 1951 – August 9, 2025) was an American radio personality, author, educator, producer, scriptwriter, and musicologist. He wrote and co-produced the Billboard award-winning 52-hour 1978 edition of The History of Rock and Roll rockumentary. Theroux also spent 20 years as the Music & Entertainment Editor of Reader's Digest. He researched, wrote and produced the two hour weekly series version of The History of Rock and Roll which he hosted with Wink Martindale and was syndicated by G Networks and Radio Express.

Theroux's work over the years has resulted in multiple Telly, Golden Reel, N.Y. Festivals, Billboard, and Communicator Awards. Over his 1982-2002 run as the Music & Entertainment Editor of Reader’s Digest he strategized, directed teams, and helped manage RD's Home Entertainment Division, marketing in 33 countries. He created, programmed, produced, and annotated more than 300 CD/DVD releases which collectively have sold more than 39 million copies. During Theroux's tenure his division of the Reader's Digest Association grew in stature to account for no less than 60% of the RDA's entire corporate income (while the flagship magazine was generating only 25%).

Theroux began in radio at age 11, quickly developing the ability to climb into the heads of target demos other than his own and custom-craft programming just for them. His extensive knowledge of music and pop cultures of all eras and genres allowed him to create definitive LP and later CD collections in a broad spectrum of styles. A founder of Reader’s Digest Video, he created many of their biggest TV triumphs, such as America In The '40s (PBS), Legends Of Comedy (Disney), and An Old-Fashioned Christmas (syndicated). He also assembled such award-winning series and specials as Remembering The ‘70s, Elvis, On A Country Road (with Lee Arnold), In Touch (with Kris Erik Stevens), The 100 Greatest Christmas Hits of All Time (with Wink Martindale), The Golden Years, The Halloween Spooktacular (with Kerin McCue), and, most famously, the 52-hour The History of Rock and Roll (winner of Billboard’s “Top Special Program Of The Year” award). The author of many articles, liner notes, and books, Theroux was a former format designer/programmer and Director of Special Features for Drake-Chenault Enterprises. A longtime DJ, actor, narrator, commercial spokesman, scriptwriter, and UCLA instructor, Gary was also an entertainment historian, maintaining files (bios, photos, reviews, etc.) on more than a century of hit music, films, and TV programming. From 2007 to 2011 he served as managing producer-head writer for Armstrong InterActive's Emmy-winning TV programming. Theroux became one of the industry leaders on the Nominating Committee of The Hit Parade Hall of Fame. Screenplays he had written include the goodtime comedy screenplay and novelization versions of The Craziest Christmas.

He died on August 9, 2025, at the age of 73, in New Haven, Connecticut.

== The History of Rock and Roll ==
In 1975, Theroux found that the script of the 1969 production of The History of Rock and Roll contained many inaccuracies and omissions. As Drake-Chenault programmer/DJ/music historian and Director of Special Features, he researched, rewrote, and rebuilt the program entirely from scratch. The new version dramatically expanded the story with fresh interviews, insightful narration, more music, and a host of innovations—-all in a modular format which allowed stations more programming flexibility. Bill Drake knew that the rising popularity of stereo FM rock stations made it necessary to redo the show in stereo. The documentary approached each year of the history, between 1955 and 1977, with a focused half-hour, and devoted separate segments to key artists and trends. Theroux acquired all rights to the trademark name The History of Rock and Roll and in 2021 relaunched the concept via an all-new two-hour weekly series version hosted by Wink Martindale and syndicated by G Networks. Bill Drake himself narrated the 1978 52 hour version of the rockumentary.

Among other things, Theroux had Drake-Chenault chief engineer Mark Ford painstakingly assemble two kinds of annual montages: one of each chart-topping hit of a given year (in sequence) and the other of other key songs there was no time to play in full. Those #1 hit montages were reprised for the climactic final hour of the show, edited together back to back, to create a fast-paced 45-minute medley of every chart-topping hit from 1955 to the fall of 1977. The 1978 edition of The History of Rock and Roll debuted as a marathon broadcast over more than 400 domestic stations and another 400 overseas, and won Billboard magazine's "Top Special Program of the Year" award.

That success sparked Theroux to write "The Top Ten: 1956–Present", a book about the ten biggest hit records of each year. In 1998 Theroux began hosting his own version of The History of Rock and Roll as a fast-paced syndicated daily 2 1/2-minute feature. The online showcasing of that feature led to it winning the title of "Best Online Program" in the New York Festivals International Radio Programming Awards global competition.

In 2019 Theroux wrote and produced, for Shout Factory, the 70 minute video documentary Inside The History of Rock 'n' Roll which remains unreleased. Fourteen key hitmakers of the 1955-69 era were profiled in the production via historic performance clips, rare home movies, and insightful audio interviews with everyone from Bill Haley, Chuck Berry, Fats Domino, and Elvis Presley, to Buddy Holly, Jerry Lee Lewis, Dion, The Ronettes, and Ray Charles. Also along for the ride: The Beatles, Freddy Cannon, Tom Jones, The Doors and The Supremes.

2022 marked the eleventh year of worldwide syndication (through Envision and later G Networks) of Theroux's award-winning "100 Greatest Christmas Hits of All Time," which is now heard in more than 75 countries around the world. The ten-hour radio special, hosted by Wink Martindale, counts down the 100 largest-selling, highest-charted and best-loved original hit Yuletide recordings (both singles and key album tracks), from Bing Crosby's 1942 "White Christmas" to the present. More than 160 stars contribute holiday greetings and the stories behind the songs. The countdown, which is updated each year, also features a number of "bonus tracks": rare and surprising tracks by stars few knew ever made Christmas recordings.
