= The History of Rock and Roll =

American radio documentary about rock and roll music

The History of Rock & Roll is an American radio documentary on rock and roll music, first syndicated in 1969. Originally one of the lengthiest documentaries of any medium (48 hours in the 1969 version, 52 hours each for the 1978 and 1981 versions), The History of Rock & Roll is a definitive history of the Rock and Roll genre, stretching from the early 1950s to the present day. The "rockumentary," as producers Bill Drake and Gene Chenault called it, features hundreds of interviews and comments from numerous rock artists and people involved with rock and roll.

Notable features introduced in the 1978 edition of this documentary include the "chart sweep," featuring a montage of #1 songs and notable hits from a given year or artist, a "time sweep" for each one-hour segment providing a montage of the major hits for each year or individual artist, and closing with a special climactic time sweep featuring a montage of every #1 hit from 1955 to the then current year.

While the documentary focuses on Rock & Roll and its variants, some songs and artists from other genres are also represented as they also became major hits on stations that primarily played Rock & Roll.

A revised version of the series is currently syndicated to internet networks and radio stations in both daily stripped short-form segments hosted by Gary Theroux (writer of the 1978 edition), and a weekly version hosted by former disc jockey and game show host Wink Martindale.

== Editions ==
"The History of Rock and Roll," 1969
- Running time: 48 hours
- Country of origin: USA
- Language: English
- Home station: KHJ
- Syndicates: RKO General
- Created by: Bill Drake
- Written by: Pete Johnson
- Directed by: Ellen Pelissero
- Produced by: Ron Jacobs
- Narrated by: Robert W. Morgan, Humble Harve Miller.
- Original release: 1969

=== 1969 ===
The History of Rock & Roll first aired on the weekend of February 21–23, 1969, on 93 KHJ Los Angeles, hosted by Robert W. Morgan. It aired for 48 hours and was later syndicated. Later that year, with slight modifications to the script, another version was aired hosted by Humble Harve Miller. The program was then syndicated nationally in the fall of 1969 by parent company RKO General. KHJ repeated this in 12-hour blocks. This version was syndicated throughout the early 1970s, and was sent to stations on large 10 1/2" reels of 1/4" tape, in full-track mono. Stations were required to return the tapes immediately after airing, though (surprisingly) several stations offered copies of the show as prizes. The original KHJ show also carried promos awarding copies of the show as prizes to a handful of listeners, on reel-to-reel tape AND a tape recorder to play it on.

Writer Pete Johnson said that "I included nearly every record I ever rem[em]ber hearing". The History of Rock and Roll billed itself as "modern music's first rockumentary" when it first aired on February 21, 1969. However, it had some competition for that title from the Pop Chronicles which began airing on February 9, 1969, on rival Los Angeles AM station KRLA. But since The History of Rock and Roll completed its first broadcast that weekend, it was the first of these rockumentaries to be broadcast in full.

"The History of Rock and Roll," 1978
- 1978 promotional poster by Tom Jung
- Running time: 52 hours
- Country of origin: USA
- Language: English
- Syndicates: Drake-Chenault
- Created by: Bill Drake
- Written by: Gary Theroux (1978 version); Nicky Wyne, Bill Drake (1981 version)
- Directed by: Bill Drake
- Produced by: Mark Ford and Phil Yarborough (1978 version); Bill Drake and Mark Ford (1981 version)
- Executive producers: Bert Kleinman (1978 version); Bill Watson (1981 version)
- Narrated by: Bill Drake
- Recording studio: Canoga Park, CA
- Original release: 1978
- No. of episodes: 52 self-contained hours
- Audio format: stereo (except for individual performances originally recorded in mono)

=== 1978 ===
In 1975, Drake-Chenault began the process of updating the documentary. Finding that the 1969 script contained inaccuracies and omissions, programmer/DJ/music historian Gary Theroux researched, rewrote, and rebuilt the program entirely from scratch. The new version expanded the story with fresh interviews, insightful narration, more music, and a host of innovations—all in a modular format which allowed stations more programming flexibility. Drake knew that the rising popularity of stereo FM rock stations made it necessary to redo the show in stereo. The revised show was also completely remixed and re-edited from scratch, using a homebuilt control room assembled together by engineer Mark Ford at the company headquarters in Canoga Park, California, and a library of thousands of LPs and 45 singles. The program employed a systematic approach covering each year with a focused half-hour as well as separate segments devoted to key artists or trends. The result, hosted by Bill Drake, was an enormously successful ratings hit. Drake replaced previous host Humble Harve Miller.

Since the documentary was in development at the time Elvis Presley died in August 1977, Drake-Chenault was able to quickly produce and distribute material from the documentary as "Elvis: A Three Hour Special".

Among other things, Theroux had Drake-Chenault chief engineer Mark Ford assemble two kinds of annual montages: one of each chart-topping hit of a given year (in sequence) and the other of other key songs there was no time to play in full. Those #1 hit montages were reprised for the climactic final hour of the show—edited together back to back to create a fast-moving 45-minute medley of every chart-topping hit from 1955 to the fall of 1977. The riveting nature of Theroux's much-bootlegged ending later inspired a series of hits medleys by many artists, including Elvis Presley, The Beatles, Stars on 45, and Jive Bunny & the Mixmasters. The 1978 edition of "The History of Rock & Roll" debuted as a marathon broadcast over more than 400 domestic stations and another 400 overseas, and won Billboard magazine's "Top Special Program of the Year" award. That led Theroux to host his own version of "The History of Rock 'n' Roll" as a syndicated daily 2 1/2-minute feature.

Following the success of the 1978 release, Drake-Chenault created a shorter, edited version, marketed as "The History of Rock & Roll: The Early Years." It featured only the years through 1971 and was targeted to oldies stations.

=== 1981 ===
The final Drake-Chenault version was released in the spring of 1981, named the Silver Anniversary Edition of the History of Rock & Roll, so-called as it was released 25 years after Elvis Presley's first #1 hit. Not wishing to increase the size of the program, and with an attempt to place greater emphasis on the current musical trends, the controversial decision was made to severely cut back the sections devoted to the 1950s and early 1960s (prior to the advent of the Beatles). All of the pre-1978 content in the "Silver Anniversary Edition," therefore, was actually a recycled cut-down of Theroux, Ford and Drake's award-winning work. Only their two-hour profile of Elvis Presley remained relatively intact. The half-hour recaps of chart highlights from each year between 1956 and 1963 were condensed into a single half hour, while new chart sweeps for 1978, 1979, and 1980 were expanded to a full hour each. The final hour, the "time sweep", brought the number one song montage up to date through Eddie Rabbitt's "I Love a Rainy Night", the song that was number one in early 1981, at the time this version was prepared. The program closed with The Beatles' version of "Rock and Roll Music".

=== 1997- ===
Westwood One, successor-in-interest to the Drake-Chenault company, is believed to own the rights to the 1978 and 1981 editions, with no current plans to produce a revised version of the series in the model of the Drake-Chenault incarnations. Such an undertaking would require 35-plus additional years of the rock era to be covered (including new interviews, updates, and a new narrator brought in to supplant the existing pre-1981 material, since Bill Drake died in 2009). The climactic "Time Sweep" would have to be expanded to two hours in order to bring the montage current. The documentary would likely run 150 to 200 hours. The likelihood of a revised documentary is diminished further by the fact that rock has lost much of its dominance over the music industry since 1981 as hip hop and electronic music have grown in popularity.

However, the series does continue in two forms, distributed to internet networks and radio stations nationwide.

In 1997, Gary Theroux revived "The History of Rock 'n' Roll" as a daily 2 ½ minute syndicated radio feature which he hosted, wrote and co-produced with Jeremy Goldsmith and Elliot Peper at Tabby Sound Studios in New York. (Later installments were produced with Peter Gould at The Intervale Group in Connecticut.) Nearly every fast-paced episode interweaves three key hits by a spotlit artist with comments by that star and whatever minimal narration is needed to complete each story. The Gary Theroux-hosted "micro-series" version of "The History of Rock 'n' Roll" can still be heard worldwide over rewoundradio.com and supernovaradio.co as of 2014, the year the series was honored as the world's "Best Online Radio Program" at the New York Festivals International Radio Programming Awards.

Wink Martindale began hosting a new version of the series in mid-2021, presented as a weekly two-hour block, with the same premise as its predecessors. Martindale continued to host the program until his death in 2025.

The Drake-Chenault and Gary Theroux Productions' "History of Rock 'n' Roll" programs are not to be confused with other productions with similar names, such as the ABC Rock Radio Network's "The Official History of Rock & Roll." Hosted by a team of disc jockeys including Tony Pigg, Meg Griffin, Jimmy Fink and Mike Harrison, it otherwise bore little resemblance to the Drake-Chenault version.

=== Country music edition ===
Based on the success of The History of Rock and Roll, Drake-Chenault created a country music version called The History of Country Music. Produced and syndicated to radio stations in 1982, this 52-hour radio documentary was hosted by Ralph Emery and had features similar to the Rock and Roll version. The final hour is a time sweep of all of the country No. 1 songs from 1944 to late 1981/early 1982 (approximately 650 individual songs) according to the Billboard country charts.

== Name ==
Despite the program's popularity, the name "History of Rock & Roll" was not trademarked for more than 30 years—until the U.S. Patent and Trademark office finally granted the rights in 2014 to Gary Theroux Productions (producers of the current daily 2 1/2-minute feature version). As a result, various items came on the market that bear the name which had no connection to the radio program. These included various oldies compilations (such as a set of LP albums from Pickwick Records), books (such as a History of Rock and Roll college textbook, written by Tom Larson) and videos and DVDs (like a Time Life History of Rock and Roll DVD set). In addition, Rolling Stone magazine not only released a book with this phrase (The Rolling Stone Illustrated History of Rock & Roll), but also had an early-1980s weekly radio series with some similarities to the classic 1978 special (Rolling Stone's Continuous History of Rock & Roll).

== Contents ==
The award-winning 1978 version of the show opened with a quick reverse "Time Sweep", featuring clips from selected songs from the 1970s backwards to the 1950s. The 52-hour documentary covered the origins and development of the rock and roll genre through the 1950s, 1960s, and 1970s, culminating in a "Top Ten of Rock & Roll." The program concluded with The History of Rock and Roll Time Sweep, a 45-minute collage of number one hits from January 1956 (Dean Martin's "Memories Are Made Of This") to November 1977 (Debby Boone's "You Light Up My Life").

The 1981 revision of the climactic "Time Sweep" began with Bill Haley & The Comets' "Rock Around The Clock", and ended with Eddie Rabbitt's "I Love A Rainy Night" (the song that was Number One at the time the 1981 version was produced), followed by The Beatles' "Rock and Roll Music".

== See also ==
- Pop Chronicles, 9 February 1969 audio history of the 1950s and 1960s
- Cumulus Media (whose Westwood One division now owns documentary)
- Triton Media Group
