= Drake-Chenault =

Radio syndication company

Drake-Chenault logo

Drake-Chenault Enterprises (originally American Independent Radio Inc.) was a radio syndication company that specialized in automation on FM radio stations. The company was founded in the late-1960s by radio programmer and deejay Bill Drake (1937–2008), and his business partner, Lester Eugene Chenault (1919–2010). Drake-Chenault was the predecessor of Jones Radio Networks with its syndicated satellite-delivered formats.

== History ==
In the 1940s and 1950s, FM radio stations began to appear all over the US, generally alongside a sister AM station. Most stations held their FM license by simulcasting the programming of the AM sister station.

In the 1960s the FCC introduced a rule that prohibited owners of AM and FM stations from simulcasting, in an attempt to increase variety of programming and generate FM listenership. The FM audience share at that time was very small. Since the AM and FM stations aired the same programming, there was little reason to listen to FM. The rule targeted major markets first and had a "roll-out" period of several years with a smaller percentage of simulcasting allowed each year and smaller markets coming under the rule.

When station operators chose what format to air on the FM stations, one of the objectives was not to compete with the AM station. During this time AM stations could target big audiences so stations could be categorized with broad definitions such as MOR, top 40 and country/western. So "counter-programming" the FM was simple. A broadcaster with a youth-targeted Top 40 AM station would likely target an older demographic on the sister FM, or vice versa if the AM was an older-targeted MOR station. Nearly every large market had a "progressive rock" album station, a forerunner to AOR, and a "beautiful music" station. Both approaches had some early success. The baby boomers gravitated to the better audio quality, fewer commercials and "hipness" of the free-form rock stations. Older FM listeners embraced the lush sounds and fewer commercials of beautiful music stations. Many offices and retail stores used the "beautiful" stations as free background music.

The station operators also wanted to be able to run the FM stations inexpensively. There wasn't the revenue from FM to support a "live" presentation with another staff of announcers. The result was the birth of automated equipment and the pre-recorded, syndicated format business.

The automation systems usually consisted of 3 or 4 reel-to-reel tape decks, playing 10.5" or 14" reels containing the music, and several tape cartridge decks for commercials, weather, promos (promotional announcements), etc. The early systems were "pre-computer" and simply sequenced pre-selected events that were triggered by an inaudible tone. Depending on the automation supplier and the quantity of tape decks, a system would cost $18,000-$30,000.

The early syndication format suppliers included Bonneville, Schulke, Triangle, IGM, TM, Drake-Chenault and others. Drake-Chenault (D-C) entered the business only to record music on tape for the RKO FM stations. D-C was a consultant for the RKO chain on the AM side and the aforementioned FCC rule was impacting the RKO FM stations. Music tapes were recorded at Gene Chenault's KYNO in Fresno, located on Barton Avenue. Under the name of Barton Industries in the late 60's, format syndication was born. The first format was Hitparade which aired on KHJ-FM in Los Angeles.

In the early 1970s with AM and FM stations in all market sizes coming under the FCC rule and following the large market model, Drake-Chenault entered the radio syndication business in earnest, making taped formats available to non-RKO stations. Drake-Chenault syndication established a studio at 8399 Topanga Canyon Blvd. in Canoga Park, CA. Among the early format offerings were Classic Gold, created for KHJ-FM (which became KRTH), Solid Gold, Hitparade and Great American Country. The original 48-hour History of Rock and Roll, which had been created for KHJ, was made available nationwide, and was followed by other syndicated "special" programs.

James Kefford, who became the company's President, joined the firm in 1973 and teamed up with the automation suppliers to visit radio station owners and detail the benefits of using the automation system and the Drake Chenault programmers. Bill Drake and Gene Chenault tapped Kefford to spearhead the next growth phase for the company in 1977. By the late 70's, with a staff of regional managers, programming consultants, production engineers and administrative personnel the Drake Chenault format client list grew to over 300, with many of the consulted stations number one in their markets.

The company was sold to Albuquerque-based Wagontrain Communications in March 1985. Senior VP Denny Adkins, who had joined D-C in 1976 as a national programming consultant and ultimately oversaw the creation and content of all format programming, was named president.

Drake-Chenault was relocated to Albuquerque in the summer of 1986 along with Dallas-based TM Programming, which had also been acquired by Wagontrain. TM Programming was renamed Programming Consultants after the acquisition. The plan of having the two once-solid companies occupy the same building and compete while sharing administration, production and other support departments to reduce expenses didn't work. While some attribute satellite radio programming as the reason for their demise, debt service smothered the companies and they were ultimately broken up, with BPI Programming and Jones Radio (later absorbed by Oaktree Capital Management's Triton Media Group) picking up the pieces.

== Documentaries ==
In 1978, Drake-Chenault released and syndicated an all-new, 52-hour edition of the definitive rock documentary, The History of Rock & Roll, a concept originally created by Ron Jacobs and Bill Drake at KHJ in 1969. The new version was researched and written by Gary Theroux, who co-produced it with Drake, who supplied the narration. The rockumentary's most famous (and most heavily bootlegged) feature was the final hour, the brainchild of Theroux. His original format for the special consisted of a series of half-hour or hour-long themed segments, mostly spotlighting key hitmakers (Elvis Presley, The Beatles, etc.) or key trends (folk-rock, soul music, etc.) He also created a series of half-hours that spotlit individual years and key hits released within them. To supplement those, Theroux had built what he called A and B montages. The A montages consisted of every #1 hit of that year in chronological order. The B montages were made up of other memorable hits there was simply no time to play in full. "Our crew worked day and night on the production," recalled Theroux, "resulting in the girlfriend of one of our engineers complaining that she never got to see him. To explain what he'd been up to, the engineer made a copy of the A montage element tape reel, took it home and set it up to play for her while he went out and picked up a pizza. Upon his return, he found his girlfriend sitting cross-legged in front of the speakers with tears in her eyes. 'What's wrong?" he said. 'Oh my God,' she replied. 'I've just been listening to my life passing before my ears.' When the engineer told me that story, I knew instantly how we would end the special—by editing all those #1 hit A montages together." The resulting 45-minute montage inspired a whole series of later medley hits by everyone from Elvis Presley to The Beatles, Stars on 45 to Jive Bunny & the Mastermixers. Theroux's landmark rockumentary debuted as a weekend marathon broadcast over more than 800 foreign and domestic stations and went on to win Billboard magazine's "Top Special Program of The Year" award. It also sparked Theroux to write the book The Top Ten: 1956-Present, which reveals the sometimes funny, sometimes sad, sometimes outrageous but always insightful stories behind the ten biggest hit records of each year since 1956. Theroux owned the "History of Rock 'n' Roll" trademark, and hosted a 2 1/2 minute daily syndicated version of "The History of Rock 'n' Roll".

Because the History was in pre-production when Elvis Presley died in August 1977, a completely new three-hour Presley special was able to be written, produced, duplicated, and shipped within 48 hours of Presley's death to several hundred radio stations. It was narrated by Bill Drake and slightly condensed to fit into "The History of Rock 'n' Roll".

Drake-Chenault also produced the multi-part hour-long series "The Golden Years" and "The Golden Years of Country" as well as Mark Elliott's "Weekly Top 30" (from 1979 to 1982) and its successor, Charlie Van Dyke's "Weekly Music Magazine".

Drake died on November 29, 2008. Chenault died on February 23, 2010.
