= Debt (game show) =

- Genre: Game show
- Created by: Sarah Jane West
- Directed by: James Marcione
- Presented by: Wink Martindale
- Announcer: Julie Claire
- Theme music composer: Alan Ett
- Country of origin: United States
- Original language: English
- No. of seasons: 2

Production
- Executive producer: Andrew J. Golder
- Producers: Dean Young; David M. Greenfield
- Running time: approx. 22–26 minutes
- Production companies: Faded Denim Productions; Buena Vista Television; Lifetime Productions

Original release
- Network: Lifetime
- Release: June 3, 1996 – August 14, 1998

Debt is an American game show hosted by Wink Martindale which aired on Lifetime from June 3, 1996, to August 14, 1998. It was produced by Buena Vista Television, a part of The Walt Disney Company. The show featured contestants who were trying to earn money to get out of debt. It had a similar format to Jeopardy!, on which contestants answered trivia, which eventually drew a legal challenge from that show's producers and forced changes to the format. However, it targeted a younger audience and placed a larger emphasis on popular culture.

== Personnel ==
The game was conceived by Sarah Jane West. Its host was Wink Martindale, and Kurt Engstrom was featured as an assistant playing the role of a security guard. Julie Claire was the show's announcer.

== Conception and development ==
The show was produced by The Walt Disney Company. The show's set was designed to resemble the aesthetics of the 1950s, and had a disco soundtrack. The trivia asked on the show was typically based on popular culture and its target audience of Generation X viewers. Martindale later described it as "a 21st-century version of Jeopardy for the MTV crowd".

Television producer Michael Davies, who would eventually become the executive producer of Jeopardy! over two decades later, invited Martindale to host Debt, which he agreed to. Martindale later stated that the producers at Disney had told him the show would "do for [him] what MTV did for Tony Bennett."

Potential contestants had to prove that they had at least $6,000 worth of debt in order to qualify for the show. 5,000 people auditioned to compete on the show.

== Gameplay ==
Three new contestants competed per episode, each having accumulated several thousand dollars' worth of debt (usually between $6,000 and $10,000) for various reasons (school loans, paying for a wedding, credit card bills, etc.). For scoring purposes, their debts were averaged before the game began. Scores were shown in negative amounts to indicate their remaining debts.

=== Round 1 (General Debt) ===
In the first round, contestants faced a gameboard with five categories, each with five questions in negative dollar values ranging from −$50 to −$250, in increments of $50. The first choice of question went to the contestant who had the lowest debt before averaging. This contestant chose a category and value, then Martindale asked a "Who am I?" question that all contestants could answer. Contestants buzzed in to answer and were required to phrase their response as "You are..." to receive credit (although the contraction "You're" also was accepted). A correct answer deducted the question's value from the contestant's debt. A wrong answer, or failing to respond within an allotted time, increased the contestant's debt, and allowed the others to buzz in. The contestant answering correctly then chose the next question from the board. If no one answered correctly, the contestant who gave the last correct answer kept control.

A "Debt-onator" was hidden behind one question, judged by the producers to be the most difficult one of the round. Regardless of the displayed value, it was played for −$500.

The players were warned when the round entered its final two minutes. Once time ran out or all 25 questions had been asked, the two contestants with the lowest debt amounts moved on to the next round, while the contestant with the highest debt amount was eliminated and received a consolation prize of a $200 savings bond, along with a piggy bank.

==== Season two changes ====
As originally conceived, the first-round gameplay for Debt was almost indistinguishable from that of the popular game show Jeopardy!. Columbia Tristar Television sent a cease and desist order to Disney, which prompted the show to make changes for Debt's second and final season.

After the debts were averaged, Martindale asked a toss-up question that awarded −$1 and initial control of the round. Rather than selecting an individual question, the contestant in control chose one of five categories from the board and Martindale asked five questions in succession, with values increasing from −$50 to −$250. The "Debt-onator" was hidden behind one category and doubled the value of its questions (−$100 to −$500). The contestant who gave the last correct answer in a category chose the next one. Finally, contestants were no longer required to start their answers with the "I am" and "You are..." phrases at any point in the game. When a contestant was eliminated by having the highest amount of debt in the first two rounds, the three phrases: "See Ya", "Bye-Bye", and "So Long", were displayed in the eggcrate contestant's podium.

=== Round 2 (Gambling Debt) ===
A category was revealed, and the contestants bid back and forth as to how many of its five questions they could answer correctly. Bidding continued until one contestant either reached the maximum of five or challenged the other to "Prove it!"

If the winning bidder gave enough correct answers to fulfill the contract, the value of the category was deducted from their debt; otherwise, the opponent's debt was reduced by that same amount. The contestant with the lower remaining debt at the end of Round 1 started the bidding on the first category, and the winner of each category earned the right to place the first bid on the next one. Five categories were played in this round, with values of -$300, -$400, -$500, -$750, and -$1,500.

At the end of the round, the contestant with the lower debt amount moved on to the bonus round for a chance to pay off all of their debt, while their opponent was eliminated and received a piggy bank and a $500 savings bond. If one contestant built up an insurmountable lead, the game ended immediately (referred to by Martindale as being "Mathematically eliminated") and they advanced to the bonus round.

=== Bonus Round ===
The bonus round was played in two parts. In the first part, "Get Out of Debt," the contestant had 60 seconds to answer 10 questions in a given category. If they passed or missed a question, Martindale asked another one in its place. If the contestant succeeded, their entire original debt (before averaging) was paid off; otherwise, they kept all money won during the first two rounds.

For the second part, "Bet Your Debt," the contestant was given the option to stop playing and keep their winnings, or risk them on one question from their favorite topic in the world of popular culture. If they chose to take the risk, Martindale asked the question and gave the contestant 10 seconds to respond. A correct answer doubled the contestant's winnings (e.g.: if a contestant had accumulated $8,046 in debt, then they would win $16,092), while a miss forfeited everything. In the latter case, the contestant received a piggy bank and a savings bond worth either $1,500 (for winning the first part of the round) or $1,000 (for losing it). If the contestant chose not to take the risk, they were still asked the question and given a chance to respond, in order to find out what would have happened.

== Reception ==
The show received mostly negative reviews at the time of its premiere. New York Daily News called it "stupid", criticizing the contestants and quality of questions. Ken Tucker of Entertainment Weekly described it as "kitsch" and "tacky". John Carman of SFGATE was similarly critical of the premise, which he described as a "gimmick", and the trivia. Debt was criticized by credit card companies and consumer advocates for being "irresponsible".

=== Ratings ===
In August 1996, the show was the most popular series on Lifetime, with an average of 750,000 weeknight viewers. It was Lifetime's highest rated program with male viewers, a demographic the network wasn't going after. The series had a 1.8 Nielsen rating as of April 1998, when it went into syndication. Martindale blamed the show's ratings decline and eventual cancellation on the forced changes to distance itself from Jeopardy! in season 2.
