= Selmer station =

- Selmer Depot
- Location within Tennessee
- Location: 111 S Railroad St North Fillmore Street, Selmer, Tennessee
- Coordinates: 35.16812°N 88.59258°W
- Built: 1925
- Architectural style: American Craftsman
- Part of: Downtown Selmer

The Selmer Depot, a former Gulf, Mobile and Ohio Depot, is one of two G,M&O railroad depots left in the state of Tennessee. The original railway that ran through Selmer was chartered in 1848 for the Mobile & Ohio Railroad, with the first tracks being laid in the 1850s. The depot is now private property.

== History ==
In 1848, the Mobile & Ohio Railroad was chartered with the first railways laid in about the 1858. Since the county seat of McNairy County, Purdy, had refused railways, the railways moved 4 miles west. Two communities developed around the railway called Falcon and New South, later called Selmer. Purdy remained a key location of the Civil War within McNairy County, though the railways within McNairy County were less significant, as the railway junction 18 miles south in Corinth, Mississippi would allow control of the Mobile & Ohio Railway that ran through McNairy towards Henderson and Jackson. Following the Siege of Corinth, the Union controlled the railways that ran through McNairy County.

About 20 years after the War, control over the county seat was argued as Purdy continued to struggle. By 1891, the community of Selmer had succeeded in placing the courthouse closer to the railways of McNairy County.

The Selmer Station was constructed in 1925 with a small yard and station. The passenger trains frequently traveled from places such as Tupelo to Jackson, stopping through Selmer or longer trips like Mobile, AL to St. Louis, IL. The last passenger train to stop at the Selmer Depot was the Gulf Coast Rebel Train on October 14, 1958. The tracks are now used to transport to more populated locations and are owned by Norfolk Southern and leased to West Tennessee Railroad.

1897 Map of the Mobile & Ohio Railroad

The nearest stations to Selmer are Bethel Springs to the north and Corinth, Mississippi to the south. The depot was later converted to a salon & supply store.

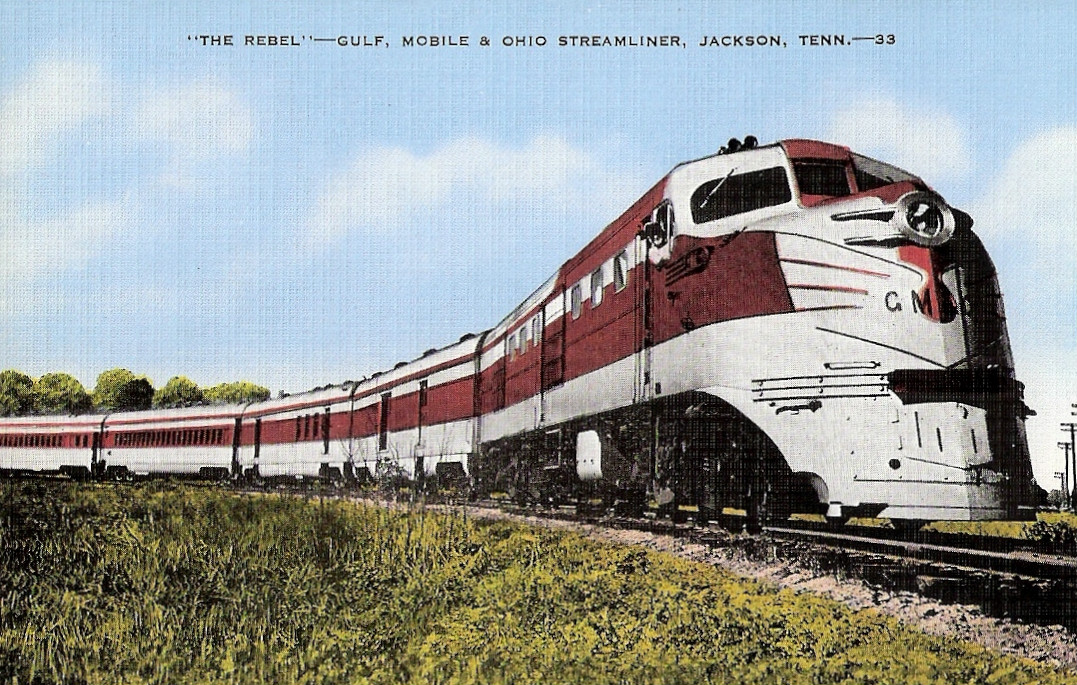
Gulf Coast Rebel Train: The Last Passenger Train at Selmer Station.

| Preceding station | Gulf, Mobile and Ohio Railroad | Following station |
|---|---|---|
| Corinth toward Dyersburg | Dyersburg - Mobile | Bethel Springs toward Mobile |
