= Colosseum (disambiguation) =

The Colosseum is an elliptical amphitheater in Rome, Italy.

Colosseum or coliseum may also refer to:

== Geography ==
- Colosseum, Queensland, a locality in the Gladstone Region, Queensland, Australia

== Structures ==
=== Architecture ===
==== Coliseum ====
- Arizona Veterans Memorial Coliseum, in Phoenix, Arizona
- Baltimore Coliseum, Baltimore, Maryland (demolished)
- Barton Coliseum, Little Rock, Arkansas
- Bojangles Coliseum, Charlotte, North Carolina
- Bronx Coliseum, The Bronx, New York City (defunct)
- Carolina Coliseum, Columbia, South Carolina
- Charlotte Coliseum, Charlotte, North Carolina (demolished)
- Chicago Coliseum, Chicago, Illinois
- Climate Pledge Arena (formerly known as "Seattle Center Coliseum"), Seattle, Washington
- Coca-Cola Coliseum, arena at Exhibition Place in Toronto, Ontario, Canada, used for agricultural displays, ice hockey, and trade shows
- Coliseum, original name of the Grand Opera House (Chicago)
- Coliseum, original name of the O2 Academy Leeds
- Coliseum Building and Hall, Minneapolis, Minnesota
- Cornwall Coliseum, former music venue in Carlyon Bay, England (demolished)
- Denver Coliseum, Denver, Colorado
- El Paso County Coliseum, El Paso, Texas
- Fair Park Coliseum (Dallas)
- Fant–Ewing Coliseum, Monroe, Louisiana
- Freeman Coliseum, San Antonio
- Garrett Coliseum, Montgomery, Alabama
- Greensboro Coliseum Complex, Greensboro, North Carolina
- Hampton Coliseum, Hampton, Virginia
- Hilton Coliseum, Ames, Iowa
- Humphrey Coliseum, Starkville, Mississippi
- Hong Kong Coliseum, Kowloon, Hong Kong
- Indiana Farmers Coliseum, formerly Pepsi Coliseum, Indianapolis
- Kansas Coliseum, Wichita, Kansas (defunct)
- Knoxville Civic Coliseum, Knoxville, Tennessee
- Jacksonville Coliseum, an arena in Jacksonville, Florida from 1960 to 2003
- José Miguel Agrelot Coliseum, San Juan, Puerto Rico
- London Coliseum, London, England (since 1904), home of English National Opera and English National Ballet
- Los Angeles Memorial Coliseum, Exposition Park, Los Angeles, California
- Miami Coliseum, Coral Gables, Florida (demolished)
- Michigan State Fairgrounds Coliseum, Detroit
- Mid-South Coliseum, in Memphis, Tennessee
- Mississippi Coast Coliseum, Biloxi, Mississippi
- Mississippi Coliseum, Jackson, Mississippi
- Moody Coliseum, Dallas
- Nassau Veterans Memorial Coliseum, Uniondale, New York
- New Haven Coliseum, New Haven, Connecticut (demolished)
- New York Coliseum, New York City (demolished)
- Nissan Stadium (Nashville) (formerly known as "Adelphia Coliseum" and "The Coliseum" and later as "LP Field"), Nashville, Tennessee
- North Charleston Coliseum, North Charleston, South Carolina
- Northlands Coliseum, Edmonton, Alberta (defunct)
- Oakland–Alameda County Coliseum, Oakland, California
  - Its associated BART station
- Omni Coliseum, Atlanta, Georgia (demolished)
- Oracle Arena (formerly known as "Oakland-Alameda County Coliseum Arena"), Oakland, California
- Pacific Coliseum, in Vancouver, Canada
- Rapides Parish Coliseum, Alexandria, Louisiana
- Reynolds Coliseum, Raleigh, North Carolina
- Richfield Coliseum, Richfield, Ohio (demolished)
- Richmond Coliseum, Richmond, Virginia
- Riverfront Coliseum, Cincinnati
- Sam Houston Coliseum, Houston (demolished)
- St. Louis Coliseum, St. Louis, Missouri (demolished)
- St. Louis Exposition and Music Hall, St. Louis, Missouri (demolished)
- Smart Araneta Coliseum, Manila, Philippines
- Stegeman Coliseum, Athens, Georgia
- Strahan Coliseum, San Marcos, Texas
- Tad Smith Coliseum, Oxford, Mississippi
- Tingley Coliseum, Albuquerque, New Mexico
- Toyota Coliseum, now State Fair Coliseum, Syracuse, New York
- Tulsa Coliseum, Tulsa, Oklahoma (destroyed by fire in 1952)
- Washington Coliseum, Washington, DC (historic and defunct)
- Williams Arena at Minges Coliseum, Greenville, North Carolina

==== Colosseum ====
- Colosseum kino, Oslo, Norway
- Colosseum Mall, retail park in Bucharest, Romania
- Colosseum Theater, performance venue in Essen, Germany
- London Colosseum, London, UK (1827–74)
- The Colosseum (Manhattan), apartment building on Riverside Drive in New York
- The Colosseum at Caesars Palace in Las Vegas
- Regensburg subcamp, also known as the Colosseum subcamp, a subcamp of the Flossenbürg concentration camp in Stadtamhof, Regensburg, Bavaria, Germany
- Bristol Motor Speedway, also known as "The Last Great Colosseum", an auto racing venue

=== Sports arenas ===
- Coliséum, Amiens, France
- Calumet Colosseum, ice hockey arena in Calumet, Michigan
- Coliseum Burgos, an indoor arena in Burgos, Spain
- Hilton Park (stadium), home of the Leigh rugby league club, was until recently known as the Coliseum
- Copps Coliseum, home of the Hamilton Bulldogs hockey team
- Northlands Coliseum, ice hockey arena in Edmonton, Alberta, Canada
- Hope Coliseum, a multi-purpose arena on the campus of West Virginia University
- Arena Coliseu Mateus Aquino, a controversial football stadium in Alto Santo, Ceará, Brazil
- Estadio Coliseum, a football stadium in Getafe, Spain
- The Coliseum (West Georgia), a multi-purpose arena in Carrollton, Georgia, USA

== Arts, entertainment, and media ==
=== Games ===
- Colosseum (board game), a board game released by Days of Wonder
- Colosseum: Road to Freedom, a video game
- Pokémon Colosseum, a video game

=== Music ===
- Coliseum (band), a punk rock band formed in 2003
  - Coliseum (album), the 2004 self-titled debut album by Coliseum
- Colosseum (band), a British progressive jazz-rock band formed in 1968
- Colosseum II, a jazz fusion band
- Colosseum (album)

=== Television ===
- Colosseum: Rome's Arena of Death, a 2003 BBC Television and France 2 docudrama

== Brands and enterprises ==
- Coliseum Video, a video distribution company founded by Vince McMahon
- Colosseum Tournament, a Romanian-based kickboxing promotion company
- Coliseum, a brand name of theatre chains owned by Famous Players

== Transportation ==
- Coliseum station (Edmonton), light rail station in Alberta, Canada
- Oakland Coliseum station, rapid transit station in California, United States
- Colosseum (train), an express train linking Rome, Milan, and Frankfurt am Main 1984–1997

== See also ==
- Coliseum Theatre (disambiguation)
- Memorial Coliseum (disambiguation)
