= Benjamin Liddon =

Benjamin Liddon may refer to:

- Benjamin S. Liddon (1853–1909), American judge
- Benjamin Franklin Liddon (1876–1952), American architect
