= R. Anthony Inman =

American academic

- Born: Ray Anthony Inman; October 14, 1951; Corinth, Mississippi, U.S.
- Died: November 25, 2025 (aged 74); West Monroe, Louisiana, U.S.
- Education: University of Mississippi; University of North Alabama; University of Memphis
- Occupation: Academic

Ray Anthony Inman (October 14, 1951 – November 25, 2025) was an American academic. He was the Bank of Ruston Endowed Professor in the department of management at Louisiana Tech University.

Inman died in West Monroe, Louisiana on November 25, 2025, at the age of 74.
