= Coliseum Theatre (disambiguation) =

The Coliseum Theatre, or London Coliseum, is a theatre in St Martin's Lane, Westminster, built in 1904.

Coliseum Theatre or Coliseum Theater may also refer to:

== Australia ==
- Coliseum Theatre, former name of Independent Theatre, in North Sydney
- Sydney Coliseum Theatre, in western Sydney

== Malaysia ==
- Coliseum Theatre (Kuala Lumpur)

== United Kingdom ==
- Coliseum Theatre (Aberdare), Wales
- Oldham Coliseum Theatre, Greater Manchester, England

== United States ==
- Coliseum Theatre (Corinth, Mississippi), listed on the National Register of Historic Places, included in Downtown Corinth Historic District
- Coliseum Theatre (Washington Heights), in New York City, a former vaudeville theatre built in 1920
- Coliseum Theater (Seattle, Washington), a former movie palace now used for retail
