= Liddon =

Liddon is a surname, and may refer to:

- Benjamin Franklin Liddon (1876–1952), American businessman
- Benjamin S. Liddon (1853–1909), American judge
- Henry Parry Liddon (1829–1890), English theologian

== See also ==
- Liddon Island, Nunavut, Canada
