= WDTM =

- Selmer, Tennessee; United States
- Frequency: 1150 kHz

Programming
- Format: Silent

Ownership
- Owner: Michael Brandt; (Southern Broadcasting LLC)

Technical information
- Licensing authority: FCC
- Facility ID: 54810
- Class: D
- Power: 1,000 watts day
- Transmitter coordinates: 35°11′27.00″N 88°35′21.00″W

Links
- Public license information: Public file; LMS

WDTM (1150 AM) is a radio station licensed to Selmer, Tennessee, United States. The station is owned by Michael Brandt, through licensee Southern Broadcasting LLC.
