= Ruston USO =

- U.S. National Register of Historic Places
- U.S. Historic district – Contributing property
- Location within Louisiana Location within the United States
- Location: 212 North Trenton Street, Suite #1, Ruston, Louisiana
- Coordinates: 32°31′49″N 92°38′20″W
- Built: 1943
- Architectural style: Mission Revival, Spanish Colonial Revival
- Part of: Downtown Ruston Historic District (ID100000598)
- NRHP reference No.: 11000009

Significant dates
- Added to NRHP: February 11, 2011
- Designated CP: January 31, 2017

The Ruston USO is a historic building located at 212 North Trenton Street in Ruston, Louisiana.

The Spanish Colonial Revival building served as the United Service Organizations (USO) center from 1943 to 1945. It served mostly Navy officers who were stationed at Louisiana Tech University and were in the V-12 program. The USO was run by Mrs. Glasgow, and Mrs. Caroline Lewis also worked there, while Mr. Alex T. Hunt served as director. There were several dances held there for soldiers, and there was even a wedding. There was a ping-pong table, a piano, and a lot of chairs and desks so soldiers could write home. One Sunday evening, there was a door count of 1400 soldiers! The building was originally a movie theater that was converted into 2 storefronts. For 50 years after the closing of the USO, this building housed several shoe stores. In 1998, Kevin Hawkins of Hawkins Photography refurbished the building.

The building was listed on the National Register of Historic Places on February 11, 2011. It was also declared a contributing property of the Downtown Ruston Historic District at the time of its creation on January 31, 2017.

== See also ==
- Hawthorne USO Building
- Downtown Ruston Historic District
- National Register of Historic Places listings in Lincoln Parish, Louisiana
