= Federal Building (Ruston, Louisiana) =

- U.S. National Register of Historic Places
- U.S. Historic district – Contributing property
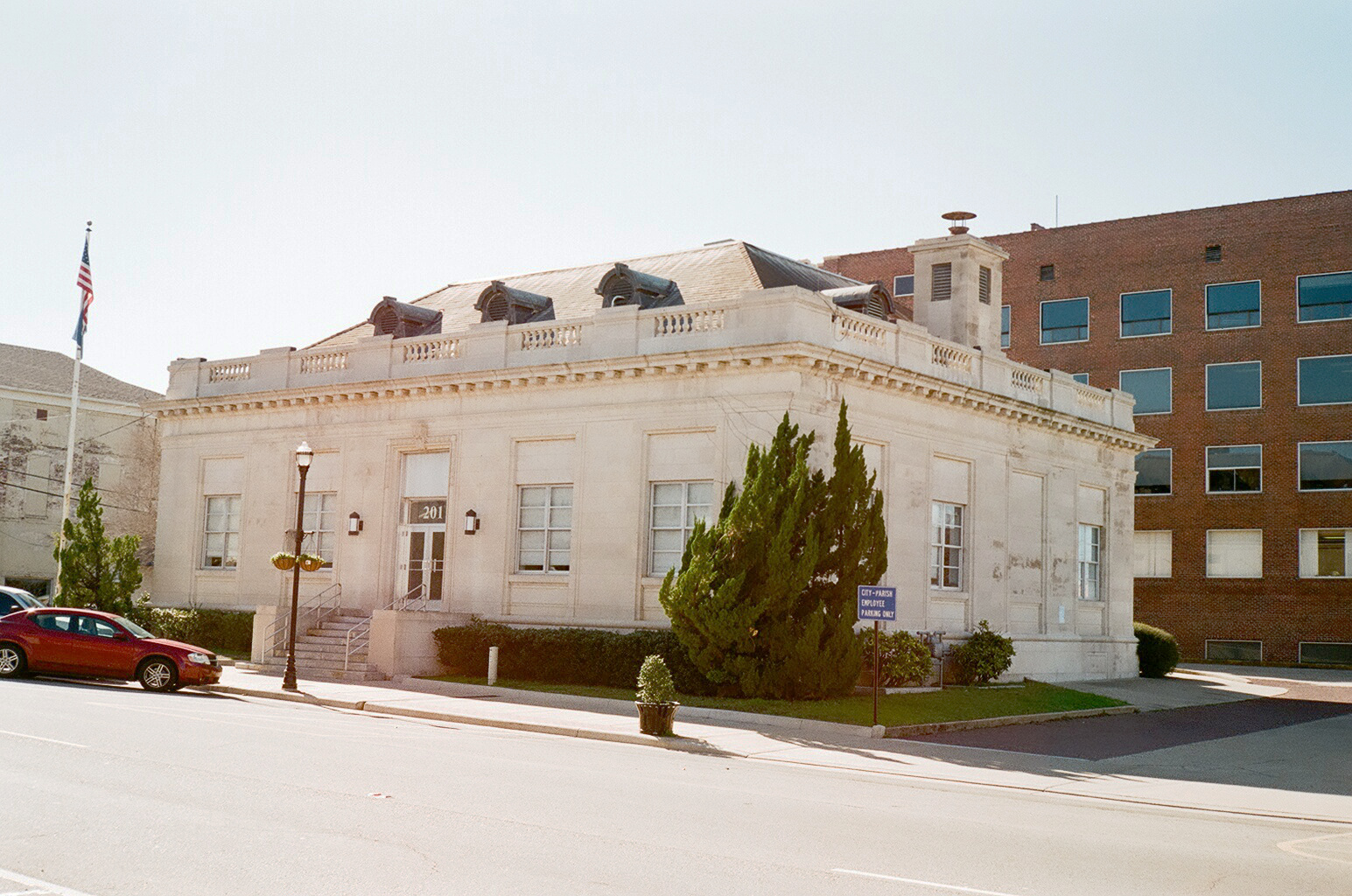

- Location within Louisiana Location within the United States
- Location: 201 North Vienna Street, Ruston, Louisiana
- Coordinates: 32°31′48″N 92°38′18″W
- Area: 0.33 acres (0.13 ha)
- Built: 1909
- Architect: James Knox Taylor
- Part of: Downtown Ruston Historic District (ID100000598)
- NRHP reference No.: 74000926

Significant dates
- Added to NRHP: October 9, 1974
- Designated CP: January 31, 2017

The Federal Building, also known as the Old Post Office, is a historic institutional building located at 201 North Vienna Street in Ruston, Louisiana.

Built in 1909 to host Ruston Post Office, the structure is a small one-story rectangular limestone building with a hipped roof featuring circular dormers. The building was vacated about 1961 when a new post office was built, and was then used since 1963 as a federal office building.

The building was listed on the National Register of Historic Places on October 9, 1974. It was also declared a contributing property of Downtown Ruston Historic District at the time of its creation on January 31, 2017.

== See also ==
- National Register of Historic Places listings in Lincoln Parish, Louisiana
- Downtown Ruston Historic District
