= Dixie Center for the Arts =

- The Dixie
- Interactive map of Dixie Center for the Arts
- Former names: Astor Theater (1928-1932), Rialto (1932-1956)
- Address: 212 North Vienna Street
- Location: Ruston, Louisiana
- Owner: Private
- Seating type: Auditorium
- Type: Theatre
- Events: Performing Arts, Symphony, Theatre

Construction
- Opened: 1928
- Renovated: 1933, 1956, 1999, 2006

Website
- dixiecenter.org
- Dixie Theatre
- U.S. National Register of Historic Places
- U.S. Historic district – Contributing property
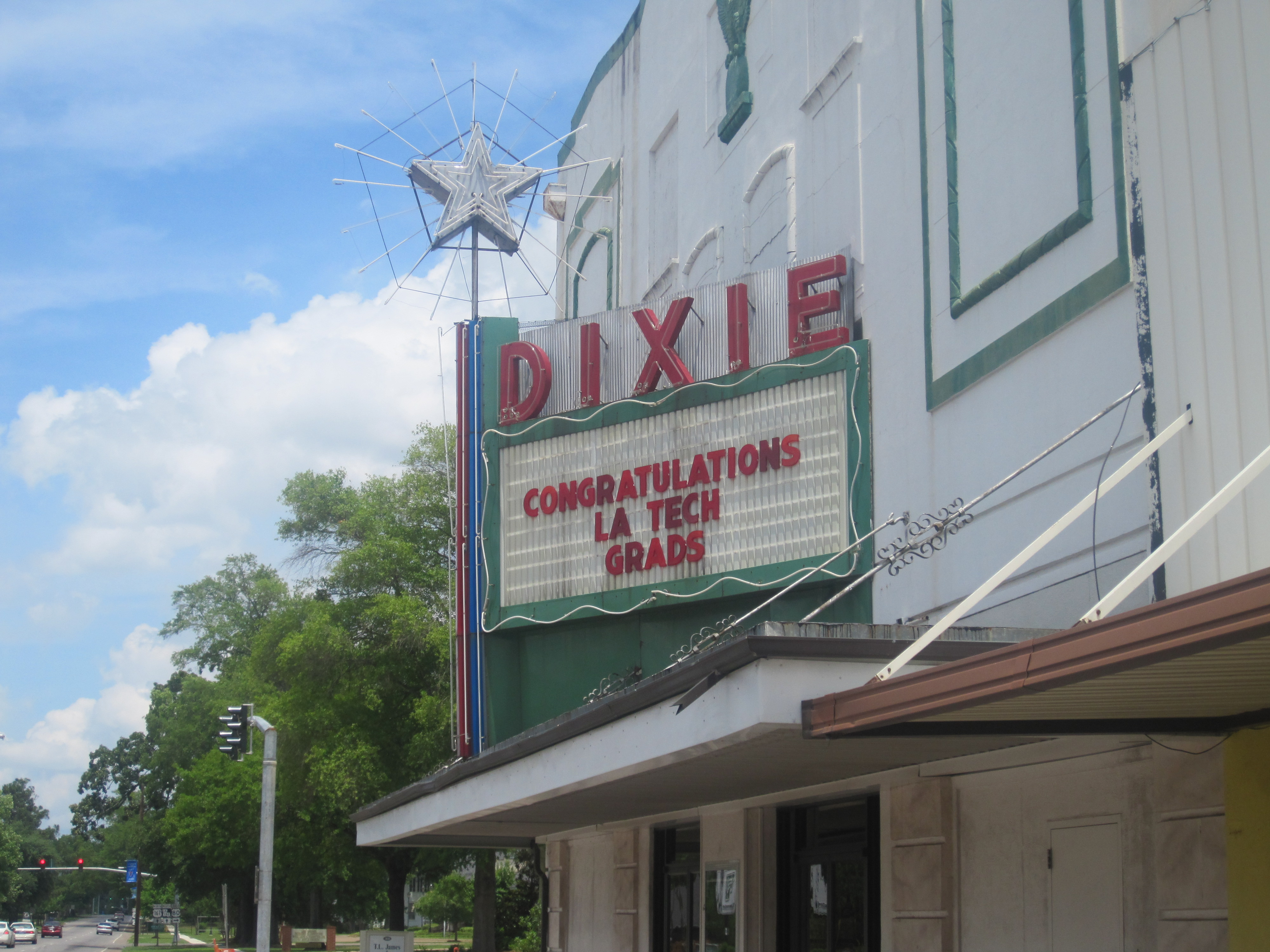

- Location within Louisiana Location within the United States
- Location: 212 North Vienna Street, Ruston, Louisiana
- Coordinates: 32°31′49″N 92°38′16″W
- Area: less than one acre
- Part of: Downtown Ruston Historic District (ID100000598)
- NRHP reference No.: 93001105

Significant dates
- Added to NRHP: October 14, 1993
- Designated CP: January 31, 2017

The Dixie Center for the Arts, also known as the Dixie Theater or simply the Dixie, is a theater-style venue located at 212 North Vienna Street in Ruston, Louisiana.

The venue originally opened as the Astor Theater in 1928. The Astor offered showings of silent films and live concerts with tickets ranging from 10 to 50 cents. In 1932 the Astor Theater underwent light renovations, with the most notable being the addition of a crystal chandelier and a change in identity from the Astor to the Rialto.

In the early 1950s, the theater underwent one last name change. After being purchased from the famous Dixie Theater Corporation of New Orleans, the space was officially known as the Dixie Theater. The corporation renovated the space and re-opened in 1956. The most notable renovation to the space was the addition of air conditioning and the iconic flashing neon star, which rises above the marquee.

After years of neglect and disrepair, the space underwent an extensive renovation to preserve the historic venue. The Dixie Center for the Arts held a grand re-opening for the space in 2006 and has remained the proprietor of the property since.

The building was listed on the National Register of Historic Places on October 14, 1993. It was also declared a contributing property of the Downtown Ruston Historic District at the time of its creation on January 31, 2017.

== Tenants ==
In addition to being a rentable space for various events, many artistic and musical organizations call the Dixie their home.

- North Central Louisiana Arts Council (NCLAC)
- Ruston Community Theater

== See also ==
- National Register of Historic Places listings in Lincoln Parish, Louisiana
