= Downtown Corinth Historic District =

Historic district in Mississippi, United States

- U.S. National Register of Historic Places
- U.S. Historic district
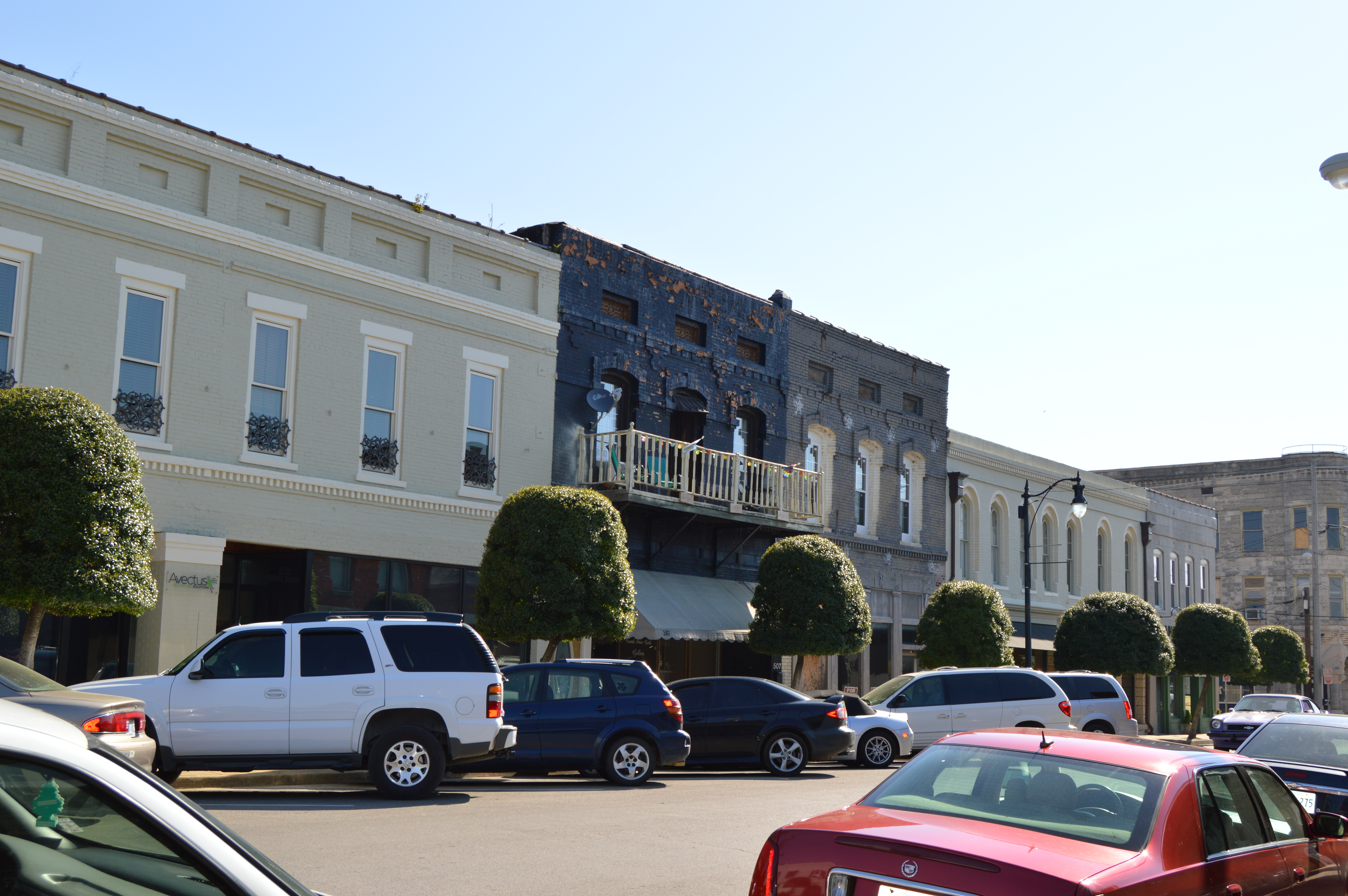

- Location within Mississippi Location within the United States
- Location: Roughly bounded by Wick, Jackson, Foote and Webster Sts., Corinth, Mississippi
- Area: 31 acres (13 ha)
- Built: 1855
- Architect: Multiple
- Architectural style: Colonial Revival, Italianate, Romanesque
- NRHP reference No.: 92001792
- Added to NRHP: January 28, 1993

The Downtown Corinth Historic District in Corinth, Mississippi is a 31-acre (13 ha) historic district. It was listed on the National Register of Historic Places in 1993, at which time it included the majority of Corinth's downtown commercial buildings. The street plan of the area was laid out in 1855 by surveyors Houston Mitchell (1824-1877) and Hamilton Mask, who intended for the city to be named "Cross City". The plan conformed to the rights-of-way granted to the Memphis & Charleston Railroad and the Mobile and Ohio Railroad lines; the downtown area evolved from c.1855 to c.1941.

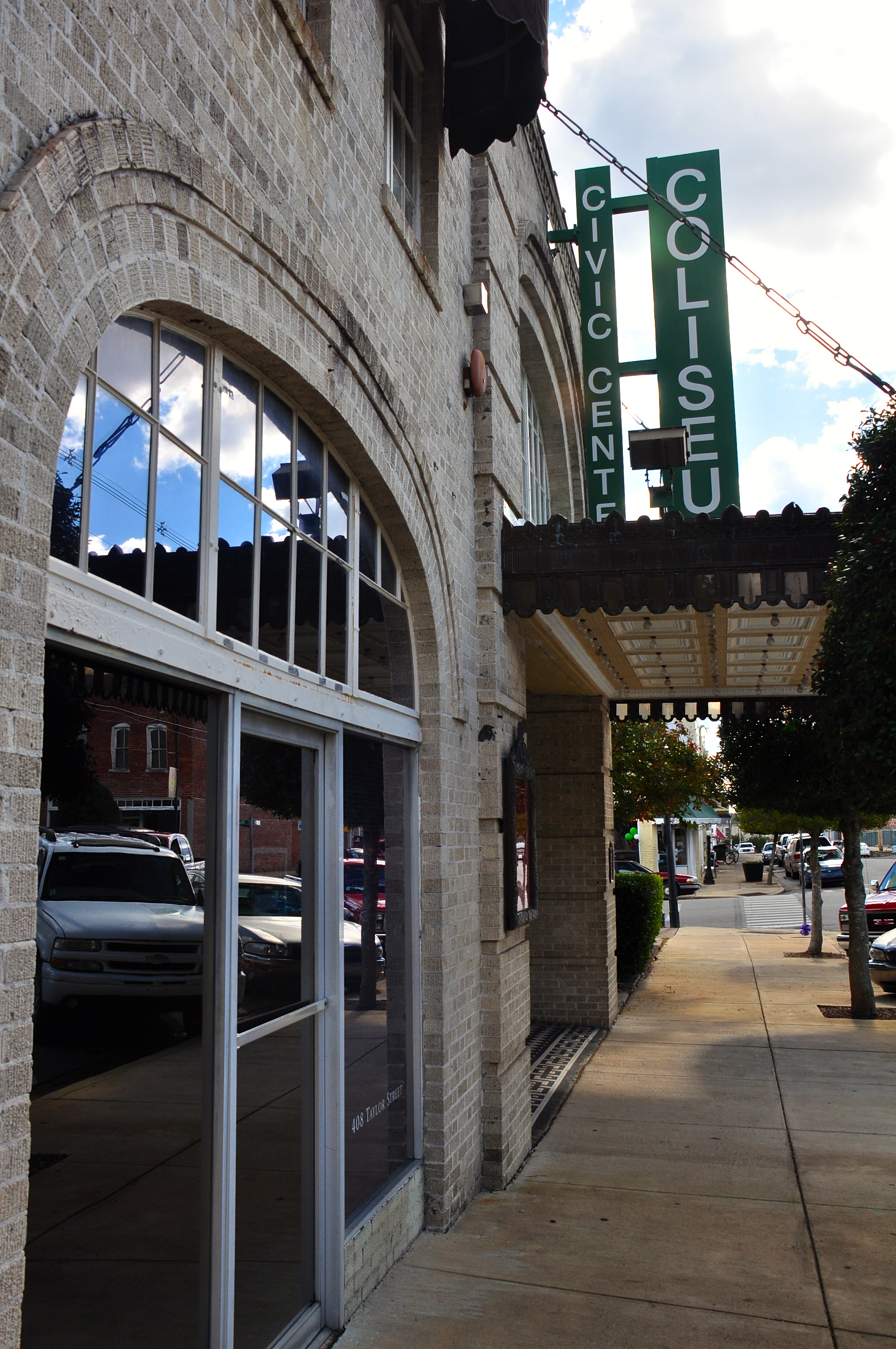
Coliseum Theatre

It includes 88 contributing buildings, 2 contributing sites, and a contributing object. It includes:

- Old U.S. Post Office, individually listed on the National Register
- Coliseum Theatre, individually listed on the National Register
- Corinth Depot
