= Philip Henson =

American spy

- Born: December 28, 1827; Blount Springs, Alabama
- Died: January 10, 1911 (aged 83); Paris, Texas
- Occupations: Scout, spy
- Era: American Civil War; Reconstruction era

Philip Henson (December 28, 1827 – January 10, 1911) was a scout and spy for the Union Army during the American Civil War. Upon the election of U.S. Grant to the U.S. Presidency (1869–1877), Henson became the first Special Secret Service Agent of the United States of America, serving until Grant's death in 1885. During the course of his life and careers, Philip Henson would interact with such famous 19th century persons as abolitionist John Brown, Cherokee Chiefs John Ross a.k.a. Kooweskoowe and Stand Watie a.k.a. Degataga, Tennessee and Texas Governor Sam Houston, actor John Wilkes Booth, Confederate Postmaster General John Henninger Reagan, Confederate Secretary of State Judah Philip Benjamin, U.S. Congressman from Illinois Elihu Benjamin Washburne, Union General and Transcontinental Railroad executive Grenville Mellen Dodge, New York political boss William Marcy Tweed, Medal of Honor recipient First Lieutenant Nineveh S. McKeen, and the ancestors of 20th century Hollywood legend Cecil B. DeMille.

== History ==
Henson was born in Blount Springs, Alabama. At an early age, he would accompany his father, a Federal Indian Agent, on his travels to Kansas, Mississippi, Oklahoma, Tennessee, and Texas. Upon his father's death in 1839, Henson, at twelve (12) years of age, left home to work as a mail carrier for U.S. Government contractor Daniel Seavers, a herder for Edwards and Cornelius, and an overseer for Thomas Turnbow in order to help support his widowed mother and siblings. He would not return home until 1859 after leading a settlement expedition to the Mesilla Valley (now New Mexico), where he earned the rank of Captain, which was conferred upon him by the grateful company of settlers. On the eve of the American Civil War, Henson was working as a storekeeper and living with his wife Celestine Rachel in Corinth, Mississippi. Just as he was about to have to work once again as an overseer for planter Moore McCauley in order that he'd be exempt from serving in the Confederate army, Alabama Governor A.B. Moore and Montgomery Mayor A.J. Noble appointed him Captain of the State's Militia and the Confederacy's Postmaster General, John Henninger Reagan selected him for the position of Field Supervisor in the Confederate Post Office Department. As a result, he resumed traveling throughout the Southwest. During the course of his travels, he revisited former Texas Governor Houston, who'd been removed from office upon his refusal to take an oath of loyalty to the Confederacy. Houston presented Henson with a life-changing proposition: become a scout and spy for the Union. He was sent by Houston to Illinois to meet with U.S. Congressman Washburne and a little-known Union Colonel named Grant who was "killing time" drilling and recruiting Illinois Volunteers. Henson swore an oath of loyalty to the Union, because, as he'd attest to whenever asked about it, "I believed in it". Thus, began a twenty five-year relationship between the two men that would see them move together from Civil War battlefields to the White House.

== Career as a scout and spy during the Civil War ==
Henson's career as a Union scout and spy commenced in earnest when he had a fateful meeting with Confederate General Leonidas Polk, who was known as "The Fighting Bishop" due to the fact that before the war Polk was the Episcopalian Bishop of Louisiana. Polk informed Henson that Confederate Generals Gideon Johnson Pillow and John Buchanan Floyd were in command of Fort Henry and Fort Donelson, respectively. Henson in turn advised Grant of Polk's admission that two "political" Generals were in charge of defending the two key forts. Shortly thereafter, Grant would earn his nickname "Unconditional Surrender" when he recorded the first two victories of the war for the Union as a result of his taking advantage of the inferior skill sets of both Pillow and Floyd to win the Battles of Forts Henry and Donelson in 1862. Unfortunately for both Henson and Grant, the war made its way to Corinth which prevented Henson from warning Grant in advance about the "surprise attack" Confederate Generals Albert Sidney Johnston and P.G.T. Beauregard planned for him at Pittsburg Landing, Tennessee. The resulting bloodbath would become known as the Battle of Shiloh, and Grant would find himself with an unwanted nickname, "The Butcher". It was after Shiloh, when Grant, Generals William Tecumseh Sherman, Grenville Mellen Dodge, and Colonel John Aaron Rawlins finally arrived in a by then evacuated Corinth, during a meeting with Henson in attendance, that the subject of a scorched earth policy and the topic of total war was first discussed. Also, at this time, Henson in response to requests from Andrew Jackson Hamilton and Charles Christopher Sheats would introduce the Southern Unionists known as "The Mossbacks of Nickajack" to Grant, resulting in the enlistment of over 2,000 loyal Alabamians in the 1st Alabama Cavalry US Volunteers. Later on during the war, they were picked by General Sherman to serve as his escort during his March to the Sea.

The following year Henson made his way to Vicksburg, Mississippi, to gather information on the Confederate forces in the city. Much to Grant's good fortune he managed to convince Confederate General John C. Pemberton (the CSA commander of the city) to take him into his confidence. Henson gave Pemberton misinformation in regards to the purported inhumane treatment Confederate prisoners of war were supposedly receiving from their Union captors. Pemberton then had him share his story with the troops within Vicksburg in the hope of "stirring the Southern soul" which in turn gave him free run of the entire city. The information he garnered, including details about the city's canals, was ultimately utilized by Grant in the successful siege and subsequent surrender of Vicksburg in 1863 which would further Grant's celebrity as the "thinking man's General".

A year later in 1864, Henson had the misfortune of being brought to the attention of Confederate General Nathan Bedford Forrest too many times for his own good. Forrest arrested and imprisoned him for over six months until Henson finally managed to escape and return to Union lines prior to the surrender of Confederate General Robert E. Lee to Grant at Appomattox. It was then that his "handler" General Dodge was quoted as having said to Henson "Well, Phil, the damn rope has not been made yet to hang you". Dodge referred to Henson as his "most colorful spy". Afterwards, when Forrest was asked about his not having "hung him until dead", he uttered that Henson was "The most dangerous spy operating within the Confederacy". However, it wouldn't be until much later that Henson in an interview with one of Joseph Pulitzer's Fighting Editors George Sibley Johns in September 1887 would himself say about his efforts on behalf and to the benefit of his beloved country; "I don't know how, but I believe that God was with me and preserved me for what I had to do. I never felt a fear of death. When I was ordered to be shot once, I told my wife that I did not believe that I would be shot, but if I should be I was ready to die for the cause, as my work would be finished". For his contributions to the war effort Henson would receive brevets for the rank of Major.

== Career as Special Secret Service Agent and death ==
For Henson, especially taking into consideration his skills and talents as a master of disguise and dialects, impersonator, horseman, marksman, sharpshooter and cryptographer, his career as a Special Secret Service Agent was a natural progression for him. In the aftermath of the assassination of Abraham Lincoln, General Grant asked him to conduct a "confidential and discrete" investigation to discover any and all details of Lincoln's death. It was a task that continued during Grant's Presidency and resulted in brevets for the rank of Lieutenant Colonel being bestowed upon him. Ultimately, it took over twenty years to complete. According to Henson's sons, he told them Grant had died without giving permission to release the findings, but that "Damn thing of it was to track the trail of blood, bodies and bucks 'til it got me there". Denied a pension by the government after the war, he took to giving lectures about his spying activities to make a living, showing off his beard, which he let grow to over 6 feet long, to promote his appearances. Henson died in Paris, Texas, at the home of his eldest son, Phillip Edgar, a well-known cotton dealer, at 10:15 P.M. on Tuesday evening the 10th day of January, 1911. The younger son Captain William O'Dell resided in San Antonio, Texas, at the time. Philip Henson and his wife, Celestine, who had died approximately ten years before him, are interred side by side in the Henry Cemetery in Corinth, Mississippi. According to his sons his last words were "Reckon you never ever know until you get there".

== References and external links ==
- Correspondence. Headquarters, Department of the Missouri, St. Louis, MO., March 31, 1865 from Grenville Mellen Dodge, Major-General to George Henry Thomas, Major-General, Department of the Cumberland. Re: Letter of commendation on behalf of Philip Henson
- The War of Rebellion: A Compilation of the Official Records of the Union and Confederate Armies. Part III Correspondence, etc.--Confederate.[Chap. XLIV] Pages 828, 829, 830 from P.D. Roddey, Brigadier-General, Headquarters Roddey's Cavalry Division, Near Hillsborough, Ala., April 26, 1864 to Maj. Gen. S.D. Lee, Headquarters Lee's Cavalry, Tuscaloosa, Ala., in regards to the detainment of individual named Philip Henson Re: Federal spy. Washington: Government Printing Office ("G.P.O.") 1891
- Committee on Indian Affairs 44th Congress, 1st Session. House of Representatives. Mis. Doc. No. 167. page 243, "Name of Purchaser. Philip Henson" "Name of Settler. William Medlin" "No. of Case 519" Publication: Serial Set Vol. No. 1702, Session Vol. No.5; Report: H. Misc. Doc. No. 167 Washington: G.P.O. 1876.
- Seventh General Report of the Commissioners of Claims 45th Congress, 2nd Session House of Representatives. Mis. Doc. No. 4. page 58, Claim No. 17182 Name. Philip Henson Amount allowed. 780.00 Washington: Government Printing Office 1877.
- Appropriations, new offices, etc. 45th Congress, 2d Session. House of Representatives "To Philip Henson" "$780.00" "salary increase" Publication: Serial Set Vol. No. 1820, Session Vol. No. 6; Report: H. Misc. Doc. No. 66. page 73 Washington: G.P.O. 1878.
- United States Treasurers Quarterly Account. Post-Office Department. 46th Congress, 2d Session. House of Representatives. Ex. Doc. No. 13, page 156, Warrant No. 3972, Payee Philip Henson, Paid 780.00 Washington: G.P.O. 1878-1879.
- List of Private Claims brought before the Senate of the United States "Claimant. Henson, Phillip" "Nature or object of claim. Compensation for service rendered the government and reimbursement for moneys expended" 46th Congress, 3d Session. Publication: Serial Set Vol. No. 1945, Session Vol. No. 2; Report: S., Misc. Doc. No. 14 pt.1 In Two Volumes. Volume I. page 814 Washington: G.P.O. 1880-1881.
- Digested Summary and Alphabetical List of Private Claims "Claimant. Henson, Phillip" "Nature or object of claim. To compensate for services during the late war" & "Compensation for services in U.S. Army" (under Hensen, Philip) 53d Congress, 2d Session, House of Representatives. Publication: Serial Set Vol. No. 3268, Session Vol. No. 40; Report: H. Misc. Doc. No. 213, page 332 Washington: G.P.O. 1894-1896.
- The War of the Rebellion: A Compilation of the Official Records of the Union and Confederate Armies. page 423 "Henrytown - Hermann" "Henson, Philip" "I,32."; 128 vols. Record and Pension Office, War Department. Washington: G.P.O. 1880-1901.
- Philip Henson, The Southern Union Spy. The Hitherto Unwritten Record of a Hero of the War of the Rebellion. George Sibley Johns. (c) Nixon-Jones Printing Company 1887.
- Tupelo The Southern Unionists Rev. John Hill Aughey. page 202: "A rumor reached me through Philip Henson, a Federal spy, that my friend was under suspicion by the Rebels, and was caught in his attempt at escape, and shot by order of Gen. N.B. Forrest..." (c) Rhodes & McClure Publishing Co. 1888
- Letter from the Secretary of the Treasury to the Senate Committee on Claims, Cotton Sold To The Confederate States, 62d Congress, 3rd Session, Document No. 987, page 113, Philip Henson to J.D.B. DeBow, March 18, 1863. Washington: G.P.O..
- Obituary. Dallas Morning News. Dated January 12, 1911
- Stories Of Spies. Philip Henson, The Southern Union Spy. New York Evening World. Albert Payson Terhune. Dated June 10, 1918
- Grenville M. Dodge: Soldier, Politician, Railroad Pioneer. Stanley P. Hirshson (c) Indiana U Press 1967
- Grant's Secret Service. The Intelligence War from Belmont to Appomattox. William B. Feis. (c) Nebraska U Press 2002
- Spies for the Blue and Gray. Harnett Thomas Kane. The Spies: Rose O'Neal Greenhow, Allan Pinkerton, Stuttering Dave Graham, Timothy Webster, Lafayette C. "Lafe" Baker, Belle Boyd, Walter Bowie. Pauline Cushman, Philip "Colonel" Henson, Spencer Kellogg Brown, Elizabeth Van Lew, Sam Davis, and Ginnie and Lottie Moon. © Doubleday 1954
- Diagnosing Distortion In Source Reporting: Lessons For HUMINT Reliability From Other Fields - A Thesis. George P. Noble Jr. Page 100 © Department of Intelligence Studies. Mercyhurst College 2009. "He [General Dodge] recruited Philip Henson. . .Henson not only provided reconnaissance reports to Union forces but, due to his Southern roots and cultivated connections was able to infiltrate Confederate military planning and provide useful strategic intelligence as well".
- Phillip Henson Papers and Photos. Courtesy and permission of Grace Henson White
- https://web.archive.org/web/20081030053644/http://www.universityofmilitaryintelligence.us/mi_library/documents/MDODGE.pdf
- http://ftp.us-census.org/pub/usgenweb/census/al/perry/1850/06-hamburg-town.txt
- http://freepages.military.rootsweb.ancestry.com/~sunnyann/collinsville/mckeennin.html
- http://www.1stalabamacavalryusv.com (Charles Christopher Sheats and the Mossbacks of Nickajack)
- https://web.archive.org/web/20120410111306/http://www.dixiereckoning.com/
