= Coliseum Theatre (Corinth, Mississippi) =

- U.S. National Register of Historic Places
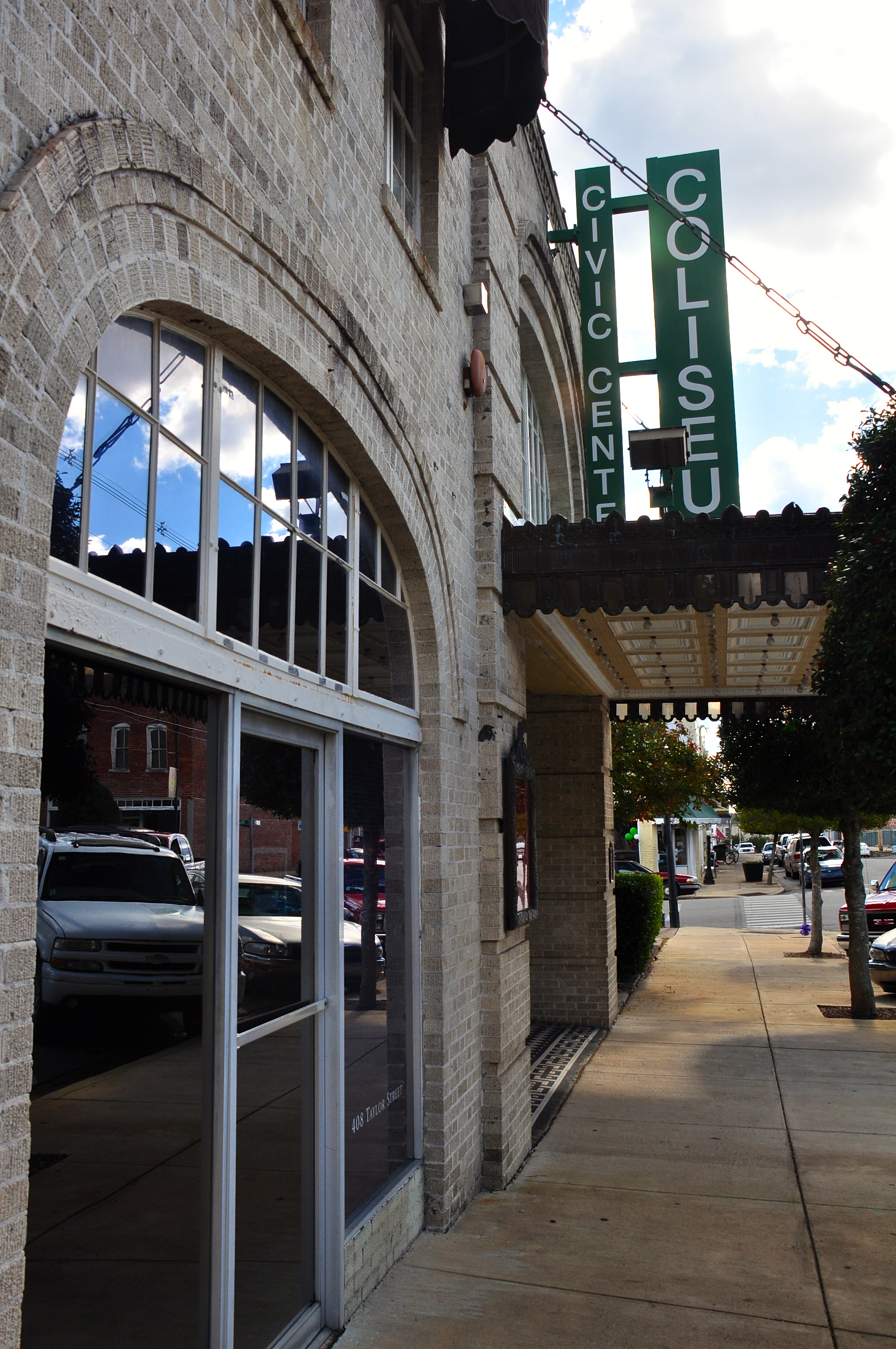

- Location within Mississippi
- Location: 404 Taylor St., Corinth, Mississippi
- Coordinates: 34°56′02″N 88°31′06″W
- Area: 0.3 acres (0.12 ha)
- Built: 1924
- Architect: Benjamin Franklin Liddon
- Architectural style: Colonial Revival
- NRHP reference No.: 80002199
- Added to NRHP: August 21, 1980

The Coliseum Theatre is a historic theater building in Corinth, Mississippi. It is a Mississippi Landmark. The theater was designed by Benjamin F. Liddon and built in 1923 and 1924. It is being restored by the Corinth Area Arts Council with federal funding. It has been used as the Corinth Coliseum Civic Center. It was built in the movie palace style of the 1920s with ornate plasterwork and white marble. It is listed on the National Register of Historic Places.

== See also ==
- Downtown Corinth Historic District
- National Register of Historic Places listings in Alcorn County, Mississippi
