= Downtown Ruston Historic District =

Historic district in Louisiana, United States

- U.S. National Register of Historic Places
- U.S. Historic district
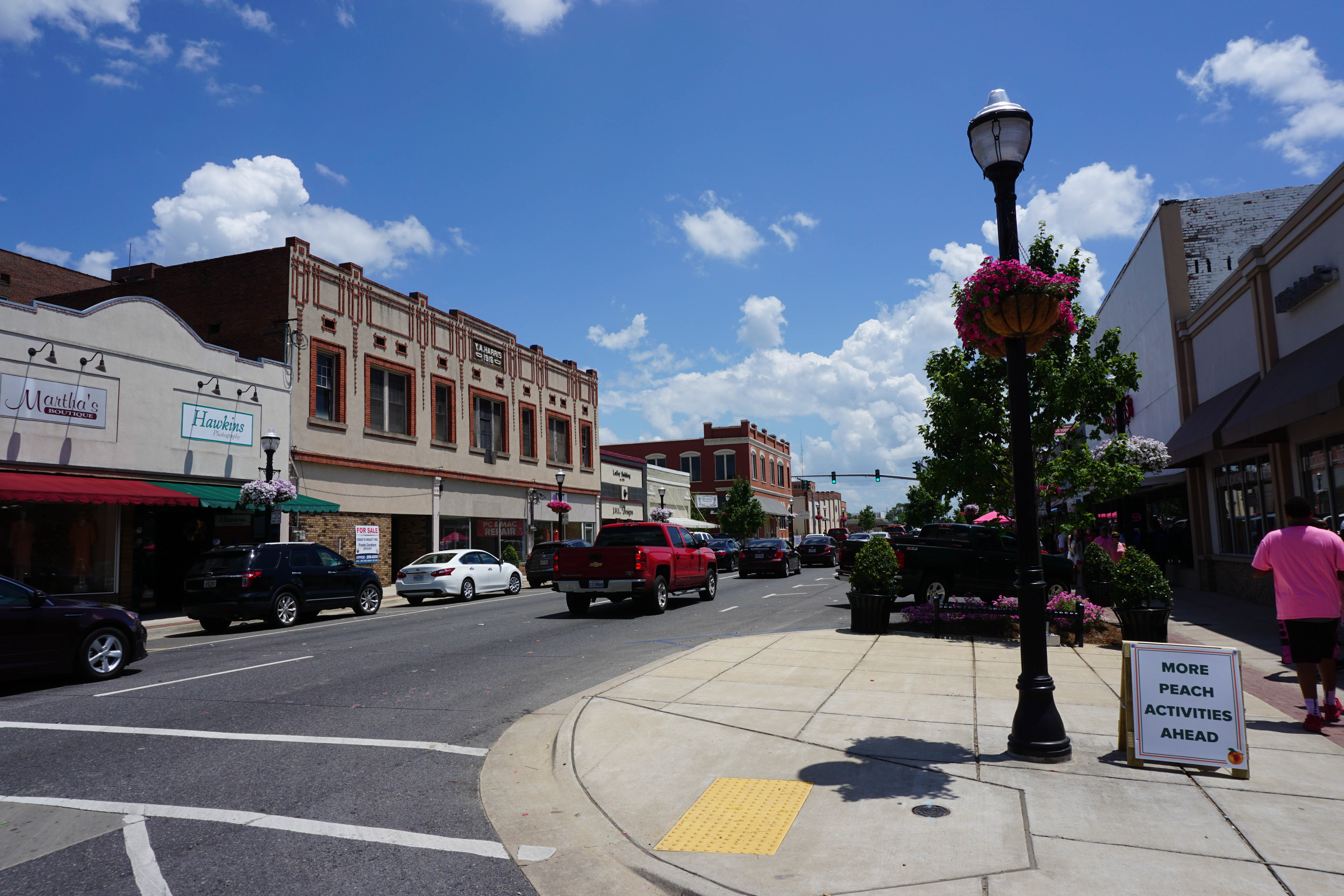
- A view of North Trenton Street in 2016

- Location within Louisiana Location within the United States

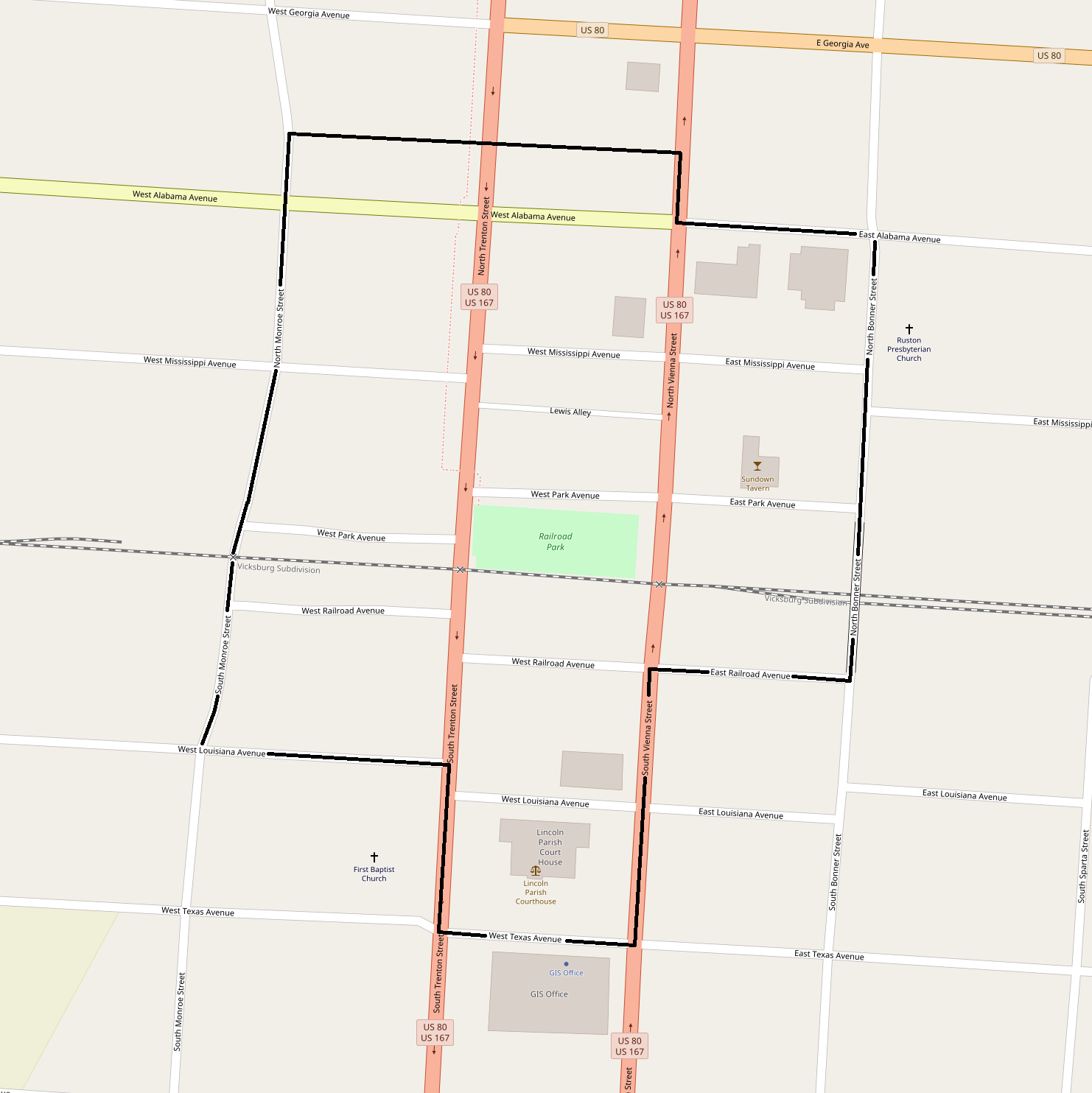
- Location: Roughly bounded by North Monroe Street, West Alabama Avenue, East Alabama Avenue, North Bonner Street, East Railroad Avenue, South Vienna Street, West Texas Avenue, South Trenton Street and West Louisiana Avenue, Ruston, Louisiana
- Coordinates: 32°31′44″N 92°38′19″W
- Area: 32 acres (13 ha)
- NRHP reference No.: 100000598
- Added to NRHP: January 31, 2017

The Downtown Ruston Historic District is a historic district located in downtown Ruston, Louisiana.

The 32 acres (0.13 km^{2}) area includes 78 contributing buildings and 29 non-contributing buildings, as well as one non-contributing site. The district comprises commercial and institutional buildings with styles including Classical Revival, Spanish Colonial Revival, Commercial Style, Craftsman, Modern Movement and International Style. The area includes four buildings which are also individually listed.

The district was listed on the National Register of Historic Places on January 31, 2017.

== Contributing properties ==
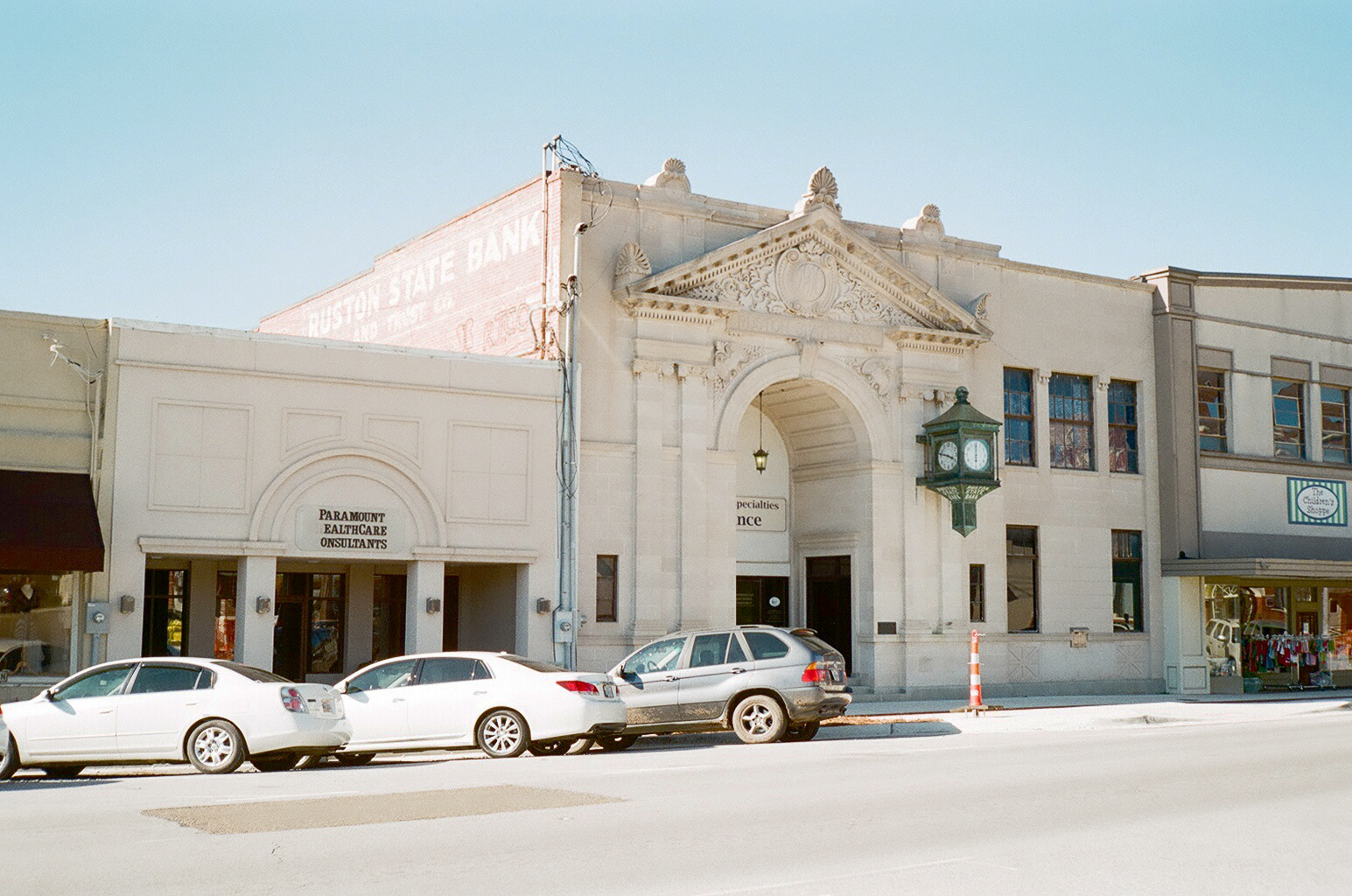
Ruston State Bank at 107 North Trenton Street

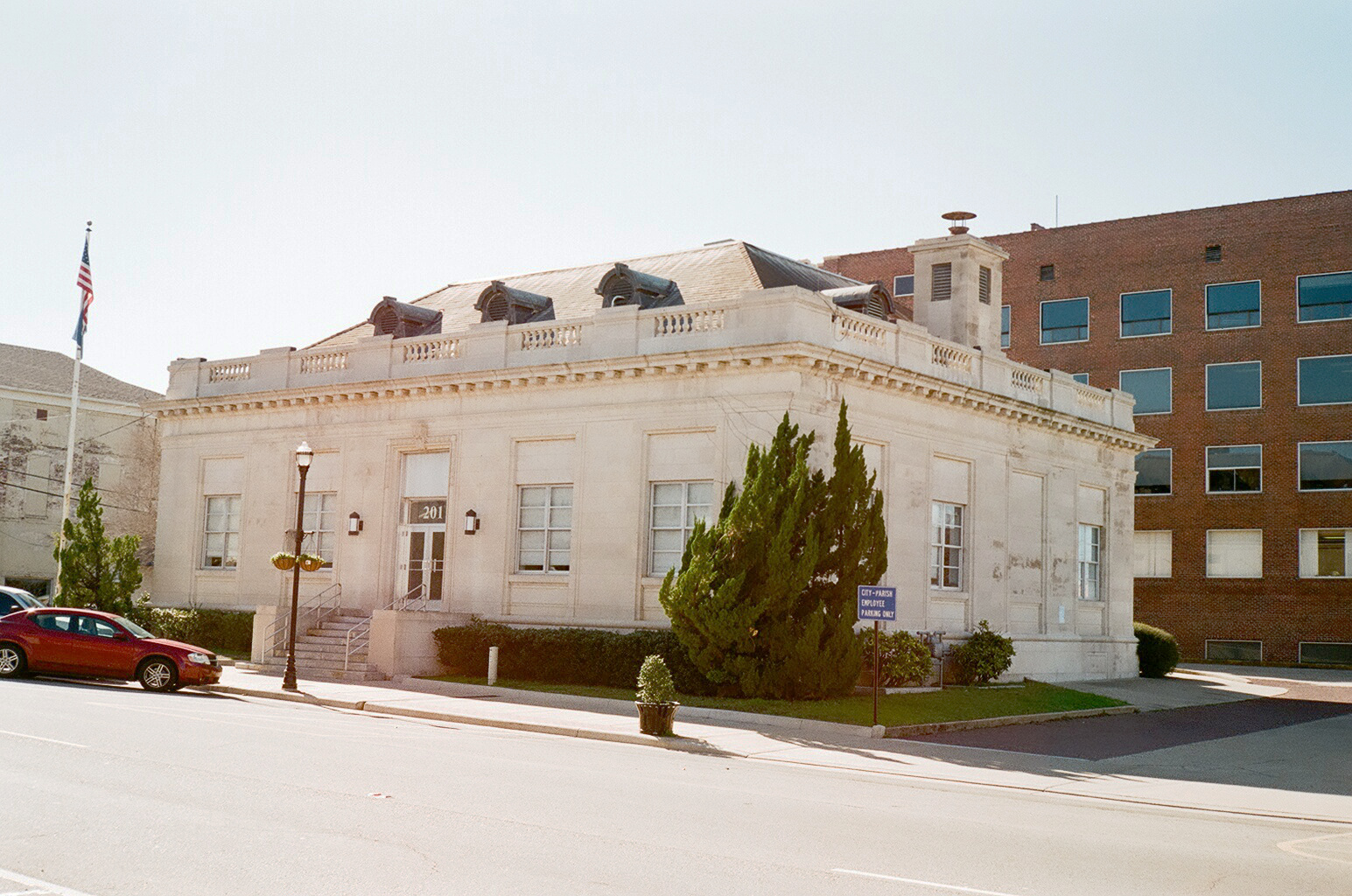
Federal Building at 201 North Vienna Street

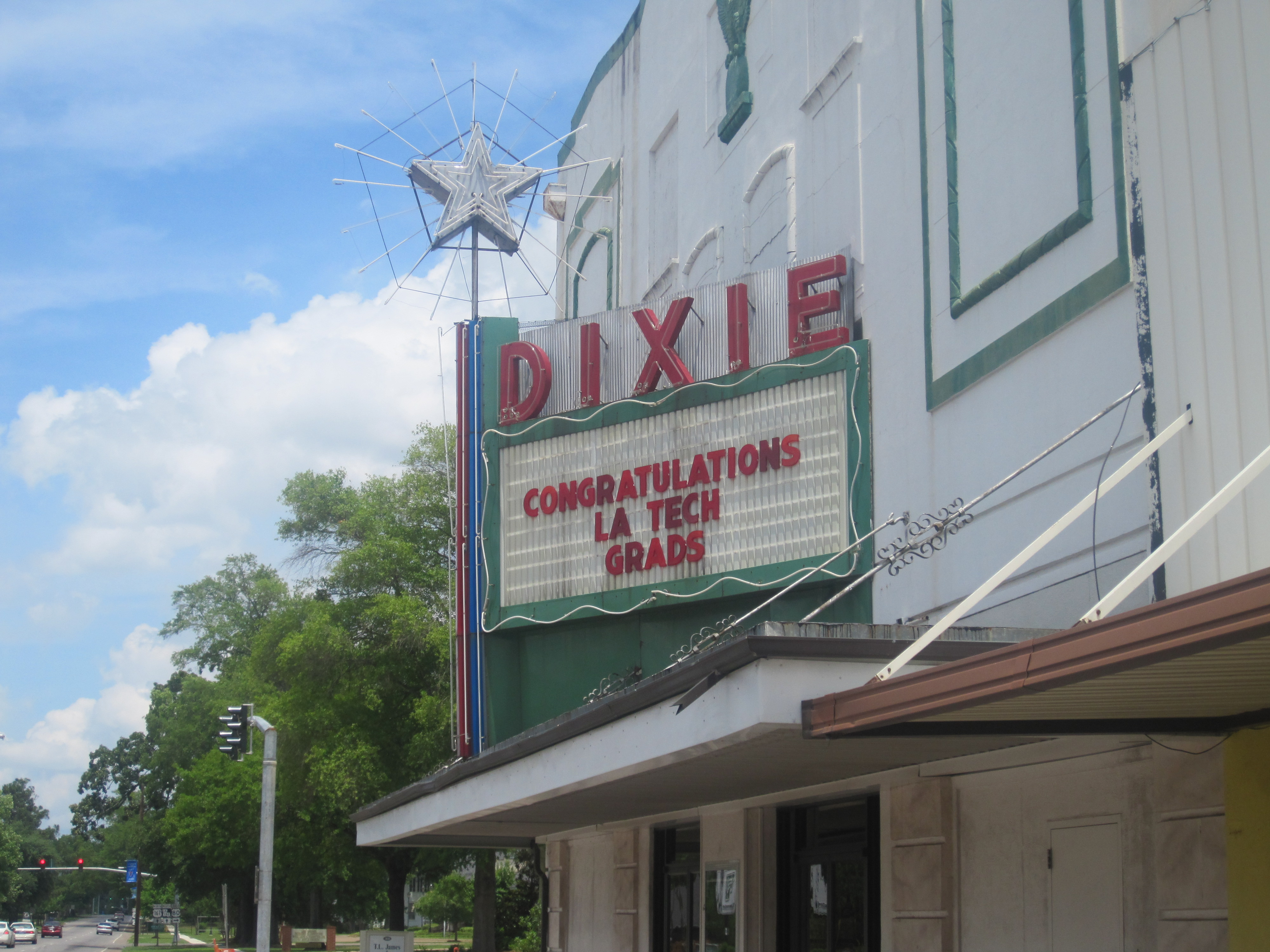
Dixie Theater at 212 North Vienna Street

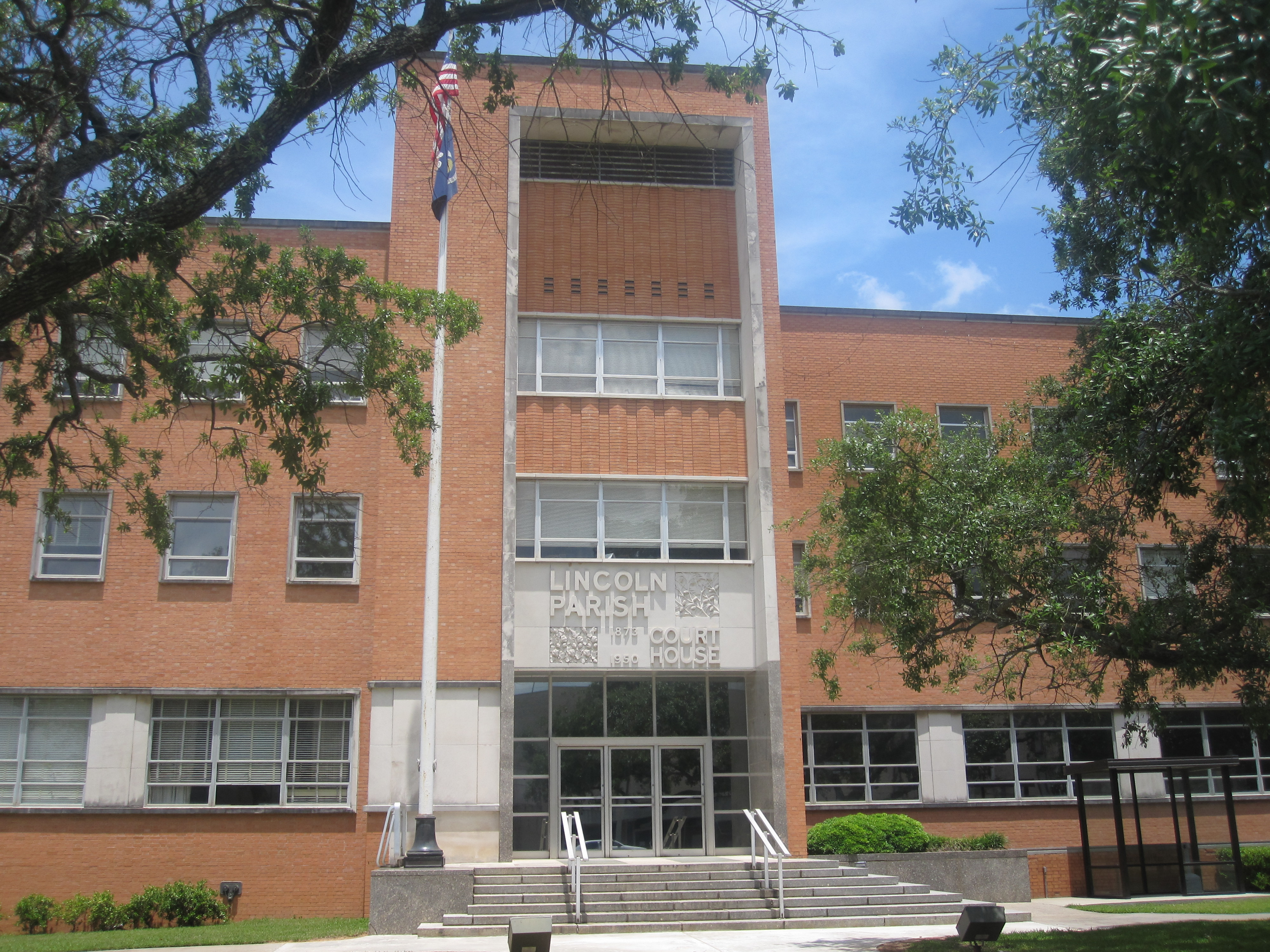
Lincoln Parish Courthouse at 100 West Texas Avenue

The historic district includes 78 contributing properties built between 1909 and c.1965:

=== Alabama Avenue ===
- Commercial building at 101 West Alabama Avenue, 32°31′49″N 92°38′18″W, built c.1950.
- Commercial building at 103-105 West Alabama Avenue, 32°31′49″N 92°38′18″W, built c.1945.
- Commercial building at 104 West Alabama Avenue, 32°31′50″N 92°38′19″W, built c.1940.
- Commercial building at 107 West Alabama Avenue, 32°31′49″N 92°38′18″W, built c.1960.
- Commercial building at 111-113 West Alabama Avenue, 32°31′49″N 92°38′20″W, built c.1950.
- Commercial building at 112 West Alabama Avenue, 32°31′50″N 92°38′20″W, built c.1960.
- Commercial building at 203 West Alabama Avenue, 32°31′49″N 92°38′23″W, built c.1950.
- Warehouse at 204 West Alabama Avenue, 32°31′50″N 92°38′23″W, built c.1922.
- Commercial building at 206 West Alabama Avenue, 32°31′51″N 92°38′23″W, built c.1960.
- Commercial building at 207 West Alabama Avenue, 32°31′49″N 92°38′24″W, built c.1959.
- Commercial building at 210 West Alabama Avenue, 32°31′50″N 92°38′24″W, built c.1960.
- First National Bank, 212 West Alabama Avenue, 32°31′51″N 92°38′25″W, built c.1965.
- Commercial building at 213 West Alabama Avenue, 32°31′49″N 92°38′25″W, built c.1960.

=== Mississippi Avenue ===
- Commercial building at 103 West Mississippi Avenue, 32°31′46″N 92°38′18″W, built c.1922.
- Commercial building at 106 West Mississippi Avenue, 32°31′48″N 92°38′19″W, built c.1922.
- Commercial building at 107-109 West Mississippi Avenue, 32°31′46″N 92°38′19″W, built c.1920.
- Commercial building at 111 West Mississippi Avenue, 32°31′46″N 92°38′19″W, built c.1920.
- Commercial building at 113 West Mississippi Avenue, 32°31′46″N 92°38′20″W, built c.1925.
- Commercial building at 115-117 West Mississippi Avenue, 32°31′47″N 92°38′20″W, built c.1922.
- Commercial building at 204 West Mississippi Avenue, 32°31′47″N 92°38′23″W, built c.1945.
- Commercial building at 206 West Mississippi Avenue, 32°31′47″N 92°38′23″W, built c.1945.
- Commercial building at 207 West Mississippi Avenue, 32°31′46″N 92°38′24″W, built c.1955.
- Commercial building at 209-211 West Mississippi Avenue, 32°31′46″N 92°38′25″W, built c.1922.
- Commercial building at 210 West Mississippi Avenue, 32°31′47″N 92°38′24″W, built c.1945.
- Commercial building at 212 West Mississippi Avenue, 32°31′47″N 92°38′24″W, built c.1945.
- Commercial building at 104 East Mississippi Avenue, 32°31′46″N 92°38′15″W, built c.1945.
- Commercial building at 106 East Mississippi Avenue, 32°31′46″N 92°38′15″W, built c.1935.
- Commercial building at 112 East Mississippi Avenue, 32°31′46″N 92°38′14″W, built c.1960.

=== Park Avenue ===
- Commercial building at 100 West Park Avenue, 32°31′45″N 92°38′18″W, built c.1920. Formerly known as Marbury Rexall Drug Store.
- Commercial building at 116 West Park Avenue, 32°31′45″N 92°38′19″W, built c.1920.
- Commercial building at 124 West Park Avenue, 32°31′45″N 92°38′20″W, built c.1920.
- Commercial building at 206 West Park Avenue, 32°31′44″N 92°38′23″W, built c.1920.
- Old Ruston Hotel, 208-210 West Park Avenue, 32°31′45″N 92°38′23″W, built c.1920.
- Ruston Daily Leader building, 212 West Park Avenue, 32°31′45″N 92°38′25″W, built c.1920.
- KRVS Radio Station, 109 East Park Avenue, 32°31′45″N 92°38′15″W, built c.1920.
- Marine Piano House, 111 East Park Avenue, 32°31′45″N 92°38′15″W, built c.1920.
- Feazel Motor Car Company building, 113 East Park Avenue, 32°31′45″N 92°38′13″W, built c.1920.

=== Railroad Avenue ===
- Commercial building at 211 West Railroad Avenue, 32°31′41″N 92°38′24″W, built c.1960.
- Warehouse at 93 East Railroad Avenue, 32°31′42″N 92°38′14″W, built c.1960.
- Kansas City Southern Railroad Depot, 32°31′43″N 92°38′25″W, built c.1950.

=== Louisiana and Texas Avenue ===
- Continental Railways Bus Station, 110 West Louisiana Avenue, 32°31′39″N 92°38′21″W, built c.1925.
- Commercial building at 202 West Louisiana Avenue, 32°31′40″N 92°38′23″W, built c.1955.
- Lincoln Parish Courthouse, 100 West Texas Avenue, 32°31′38″N 92°38′20″W, built 1949-1950. Designed by Neild and Somdal.

=== Trenton Street ===
- Commercial building at 101 North Trenton Street, 32°31′44″N 92°38′22″W, built c.1930.
- Commercial building at 103 North Trenton Street, 32°31′44″N 92°38′22″W, built c.1930.
- Ruston State Bank, 107 North Trenton Street, 32°31′45″N 92°38′22″W, built 1910. Also individually listed.
- Commercial building at 109 North Trenton Street, 32°31′46″N 92°38′22″W, built c.1920.
- Rogers Furniture building, 111 North Trenton Street, 32°31′46″N 92°38′23″W, built c.1945.
- Commercial building at 114-122 North Trenton Street, 32°31′47″N 92°38′21″W, built c.1920.
- Commercial building at 200 North Trenton Street, 32°31′48″N 92°38′21″W, built c.1940.
- Commercial building at 201 North Trenton Street, 32°31′47″N 92°38′22″W, built c.1940.
- Commercial building at 202 North Trenton Street, 32°31′48″N 92°38′20″W, built c.1930.
- Commercial building at 205 North Trenton Street, 32°31′48″N 92°38′22″W, built c.1950.
- Y.A. Harris Building, 206-210 North Trenton Street, 32°31′48″N 92°38′20″W, built 1916.
- Commercial building at 207 North Trenton Street, 32°31′48″N 92°38′22″W, built c.1950.
- Kitishian's, 211 North Trenton Street, 32°31′48″N 92°38′22″W, built c.1955.
- Ruston USO, 212 North Trenton Street, 32°31′49″N 92°38′20″W, built c.1922. Also individually listed.
- Commercial building at 214 North Trenton Street, 32°31′49″N 92°38′20″W, built c.1930.
- Commercial building at 300 North Trenton Street, 32°31′51″N 92°38′20″W, built c.1960.
- Commercial building at 303 North Trenton Street, 32°31′51″N 92°38′22″W, built c.1960.
- Commercial building at 100-104 South Trenton Street, 32°31′42″N 92°38′23″W, built c.1920.
- Commercial building at 108 South Trenton Street, 32°31′41″N 92°38′23″W, built c.1920.
- Commercial building at 110-112 South Trenton Street, 32°31′41″N 92°38′23″W, built c.1945.
- Commercial building at 114-116 South Trenton Street, 32°31′40″N 92°38′23″W, built c.1950.
- Commercial building at 117 South Trenton Street, 32°31′40″N 92°38′21″W, built c.1940.
- Commercial building at 118 South Trenton Street, 32°31′40″N 92°38′23″W, built c.1940.
- Commercial building at 120 South Trenton Street, 32°31′40″N 92°38′23″W, built c.1948.
- Building at 307 North Trenton Street, 32°31′52″N 92°38′22″W, built c.1940.

=== Vienna Street ===
- Commercial building at 100 North Vienna Street, 32°31′45″N 92°38′16″W, built c.1955.
- Commercial building at 108 North Vienna Street, 32°31′46″N 92°38′16″W, built c.1930.
- Commercial building at 109-113 North Vienna Street, 32°31′46″N 92°38′18″W, built c.1930.
- Commercial building at 110 North Vienna Street, 32°31′46″N 92°38′16″W, built c.1920.
- Commercial building at 116 North Vienna Street, 32°31′46″N 92°38′16″W, built c.1922.
- Commercial building at 200 North Vienna Street, 32°31′47″N 92°38′16″W, built c.1930.
- Federal Building, 201 North Vienna Street, 32°31′48″N 92°38′18″W, built 1909. Also individually listed.
- "Moving Pictures" building, 202 North Vienna Street, 32°31′48″N 92°38′16″W, built c.1922.
- Commercial building at 204-206 North Vienna Street, 32°31′48″N 92°38′16″W, built c.1930.
- Dixie Theater, 212 North Vienna Street, 32°31′49″N 92°38′16″W, built c.1928. Also individually listed.
- Commercial building at 101 South Vienna Street, 32°31′39″N 92°38′19″W, built c.1920.

== See also ==
- National Register of Historic Places listings in Lincoln Parish, Louisiana
- Dixie Theatre
- Federal Building
- Ruston USO
- Ruston State Bank
