= Corinth station =

Corinth station may refer to the following stations:

- Corinth railway station (old), the railway station that served Corinth, Greece until the mid-2000s
- Corinth railway station, the new railway station in Corinth, Greece that opened in 2005
- Corinth railway station (Mississippi), an American Civil War-era railway junction in Corinth, Mississippi.
- Corinth station (A-train), a proposed commuter rail station in Corinth, Texas
