= John F. Osborne =

American journalist

John Franklin Osborne (March 15, 1907 – May 3, 1981) was an American magazine editor and journalist.

== Background ==
He was born in Corinth, Mississippi.

== Career ==
Osborne wrote for the Memphis Commercial Appeal and the Associated Press before joining the National Recovery Administration, and then the Tennessee Valley Authority, as a U.S. government public relations officer during the Great Depression.

He became an editor at Time–Life. In 1940, William Saroyan lists him among "contributing editors" at Time in the play, Love's Old Sweet Song. Eventually, he became Time's London editor and then Far East editor (based in Hong Kong) in the 1950s.

After returning to the United States, he lived in Georgetown and in Sag Harbor, Long Island, New York.

He later became senior editor at New Republic.

== Awards ==
Osborne won the Polk Award for magazine journalism in 1973.

His work landed him on the first Nixon's Enemies List, a limited master list of famous people that President Nixon considered his direct political opponents.

== Personal and death ==
He married twice. His widow, Gertrude (Trudi) McCullough Osborne, the daughter of an Indiana senator, was also a writer. She died in Washington, D.C. in 1994. She was the mother of his only child, John F. Osborne III (d. 2006) who was married to author Peggy Ann Osborne.

== Works ==
He wrote "The Nixon Watch" column, which was noted for its preoccupation with the relationship between Richard Nixon and Henry Kissinger, followed by "The White House Watch" column.

In addition to his political books, he co-authored two Time-Life series books, one about Britain, the other about the Old South.
