= Benjamin Franklin Liddon =

American architect

Benjamin Franklin Liddon (May 1, 1876 – August, 1952) was an American businessman and civic leader. While residing in Corinth, Mississippi, he designed several buildings, including a theater and his home.

== Biography ==
Liddon married Letitia Borroum, daughter of Dr. Andrew Jackson Borroum. He died in August 1952 in Corinth, Mississippi.

== Architecture ==
Liddon designed the Corinth Coliseum Theatre, at 404 Taylor Street, Corinth. It is a Mississippi Landmark that is also listed on the National Register of Historic Places. After being used for live performances and films, it was readapted for use as a civic center.

Liddon's home is known as the Benjamin Liddon Castle or Benjamin Liddon House. In 2015 the home he built for his family in Corinth, Mississippi, was being restored.

== See also ==
- Midtown Corinth Historic District
