= Falcon, Tennessee =

Coordinates: 35°08′41″N 88°36′05″W

Falcon is a neighborhood in the city of Selmer, Tennessee, this neighborhood is the site of the Falcon Church, Falcon Cemetery, City of Selmer Fire Department, Owl Creek Lumber, Phillips 66, and McNairy County Sheriff's Office, Falcon is a neighborhood in the city of Selmer, Tennessee. The neighborhood is the site of the Falcon Church, Falcon Cemetery, City of Selmer Fire Department, Owl Creek Lumber, Phillips 66, and McNairy County Sheriff's Office, all of which are operated by the city.

== History ==
A post office called Falcon was established in 1874, and closed the next year in 1875. For a short time, Falcon served as the county seat, now it has been annexed by the city of Selmer, it is now a neighborhood in South Selmer
