= Ruston State Bank =

- U.S. National Register of Historic Places
- U.S. Historic district – Contributing property
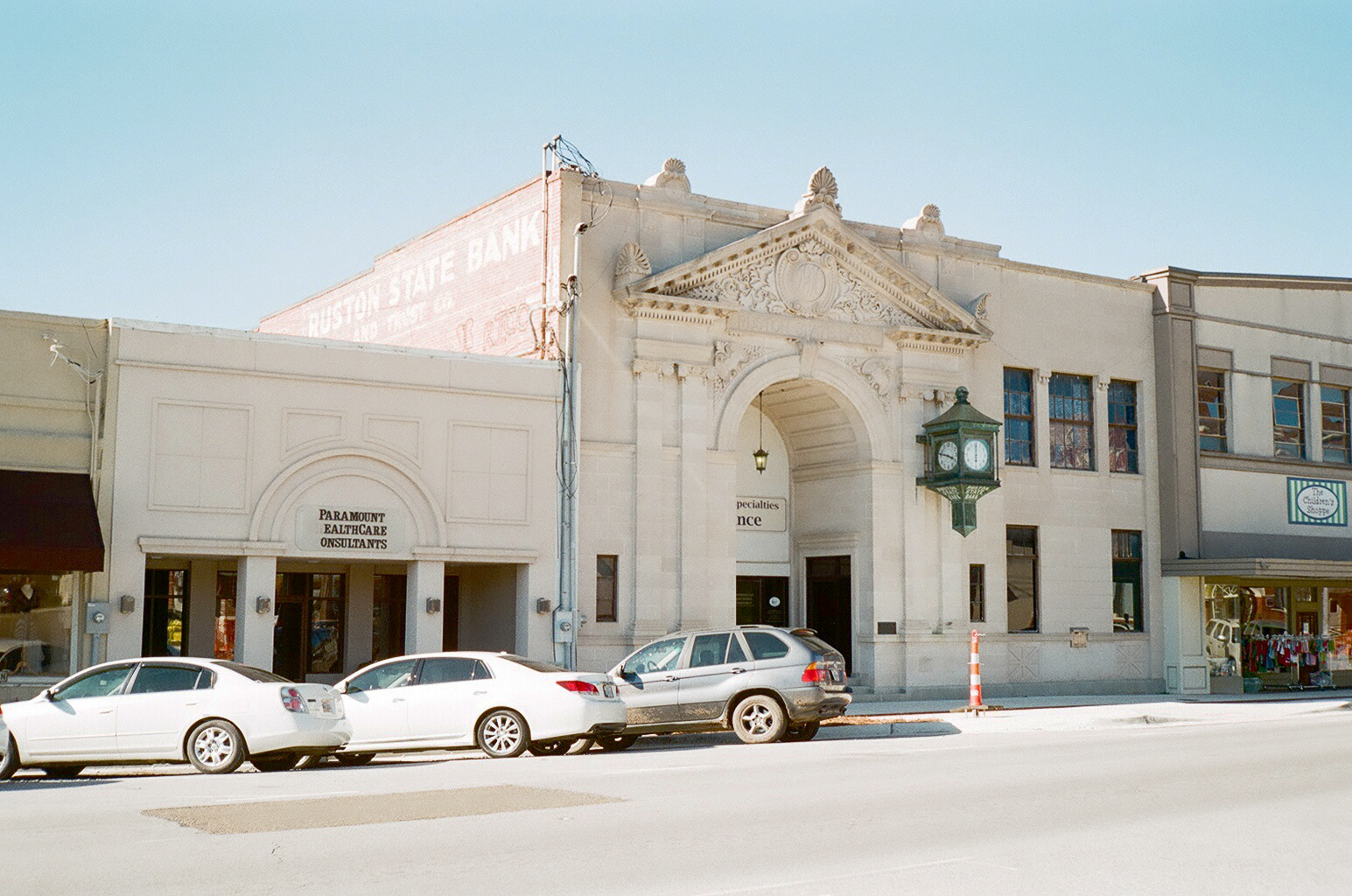

- Location within Louisiana Location within the United States
- Location: 107 North Trenton Street, Ruston, Louisiana
- Coordinates: 32°31′45″N 92°38′22″W
- Area: less than one acre
- Built: 1910
- Architectural style: Beaux Arts
- Part of: Downtown Ruston Historic District (ID100000598)
- NRHP reference No.: 90001730

Significant dates
- Added to NRHP: November 2, 1990
- Designated CP: January 31, 2017

The Ruston State Bank, also known as the Ruston State Bank and Trust Company, is a historic institutional building located at 107 North Trenton Street in Ruston, Louisiana, United States.

Built in 1910, the two-story masonry structure is decorated in Beaux Arts style. The building features a stone facade combining the idea of a Roman triumphal arch with that of a temple front. A clock was installed on the facade in 1927.

The building was listed on the National Register of Historic Places on November 2, 1990. It was also declared a contributing property of Downtown Ruston Historic District at the time of its creation on January 31, 2017.

== See also ==
- National Register of Historic Places listings in Lincoln Parish, Louisiana
- Downtown Ruston Historic District
