= Corinth station (Mississippi) =

Historic property and museum in Mississippi, United States

- Corinth Depot
- U.S. Historic district – Contributing property
- Mississippi Landmark
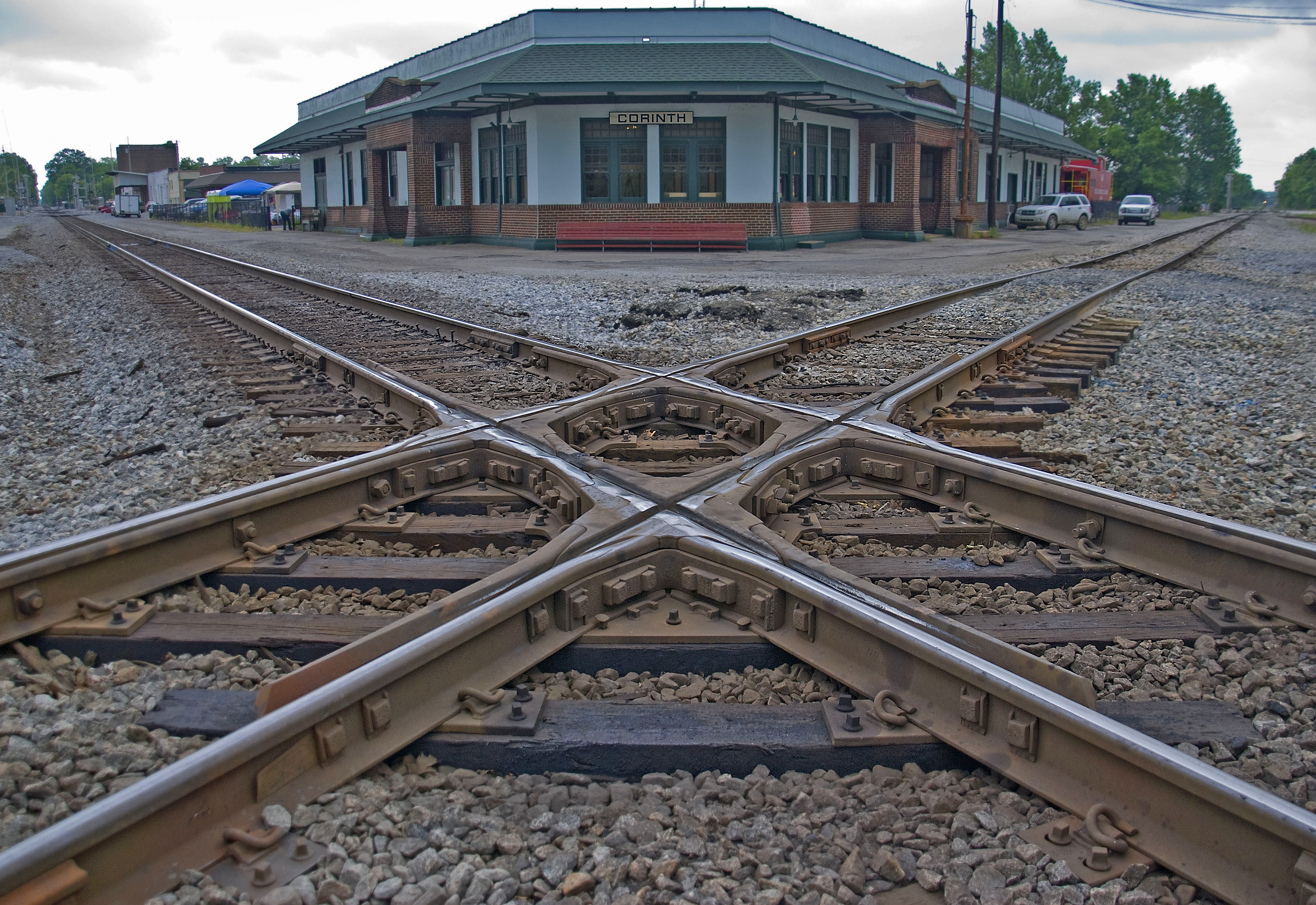
- Main façade of the Crossroads Museum

- Location within Mississippi
- Location: 221 North Fillmore Street, Corinth, Mississippi
- Coordinates: 34.93389°N 88.52222°W
- Built: c. 1917
- Architectural style: American Craftsman
- Part of: Downtown Corinth Historic District (ID92001792)
- USMS No.: 003-COR-0117-NRD-ML

Significant dates
- Designated CP: January 29, 1993
- Designated USMS: September 28, 1995

The Corinth Depot, also known as the Gulf, Mobile and Ohio Depot, is located at 221 North Fillmore Street in Corinth, Mississippi. Built circa 1917, the depot is the home of the Crossroads Museum. It is a contributing property to the Downtown Corinth Historic District, which was placed on the National Register of Historic Places in 1993. In 1995, the depot was designated a Mississippi Landmark.

== History ==
In 1857, a parcel of land in Corinth was dedicated for construction of a depot where two railroads (the Memphis & Charleston and the Mobile & Ohio) intersected. Because of this railroad junction, control of Corinth was of strategic importance during the American Civil War, which led to the Siege of Corinth and later the Second Battle of Corinth.

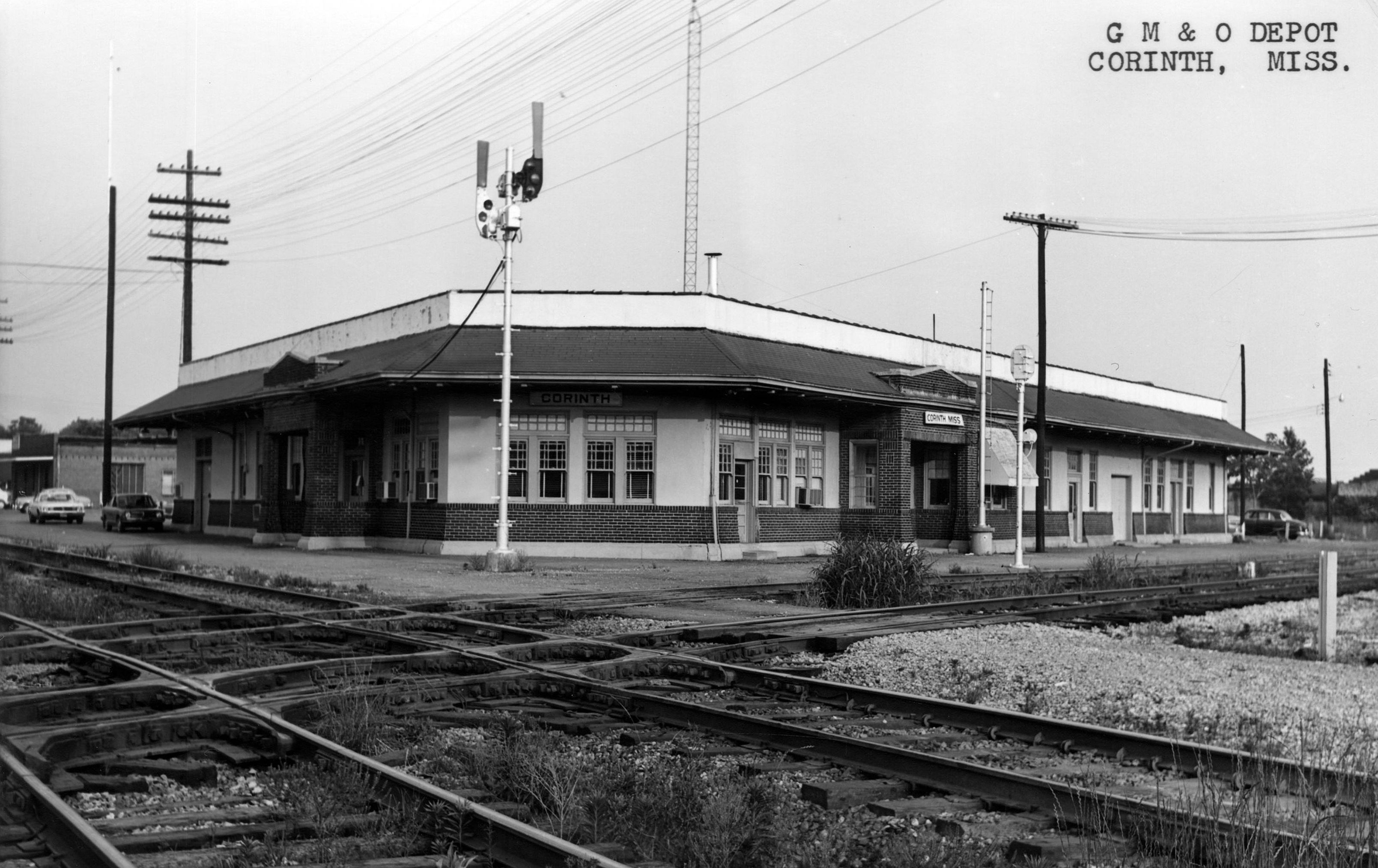
G. M. & O. Depot in the 1960s.

The present structure is the third depot to be constructed on the site. The depot is a one-story, wood-frame building with a V-shaped floor plan, designed to accommodate the intersection of the two railways. The exterior walls have stucco veneer with brick wainscot. The two railways had separate brick portico entrances into the depot. Passengers, that arrived for departure, entered the depot on the opposite side of the building, in the crook of the V.

The depot received its greatest usage during the 1930s and 1940s, when it served dozens of passenger trains. In 2007, the depot became the home for the Corinth Crossroads Museum with displays of Civil War artifacts, historic photographs, industrial items, and railroad souvenirs.

Crossroads Museum Depot today. (2026)

== Surrounding Stations ==
| Preceding station | Gulf, Mobile and Ohio Railroad | Following station |
|---|---|---|
| Selmer toward Dyersburg | Dyersburg - Mobile | Reinzi toward Mobile |
| Preceding station | Southern Railway | Following station |
| West Corinth toward Memphis | Memphis – Bristol | Strickland toward Bristol |
