= Selmer, Tennessee =

- City
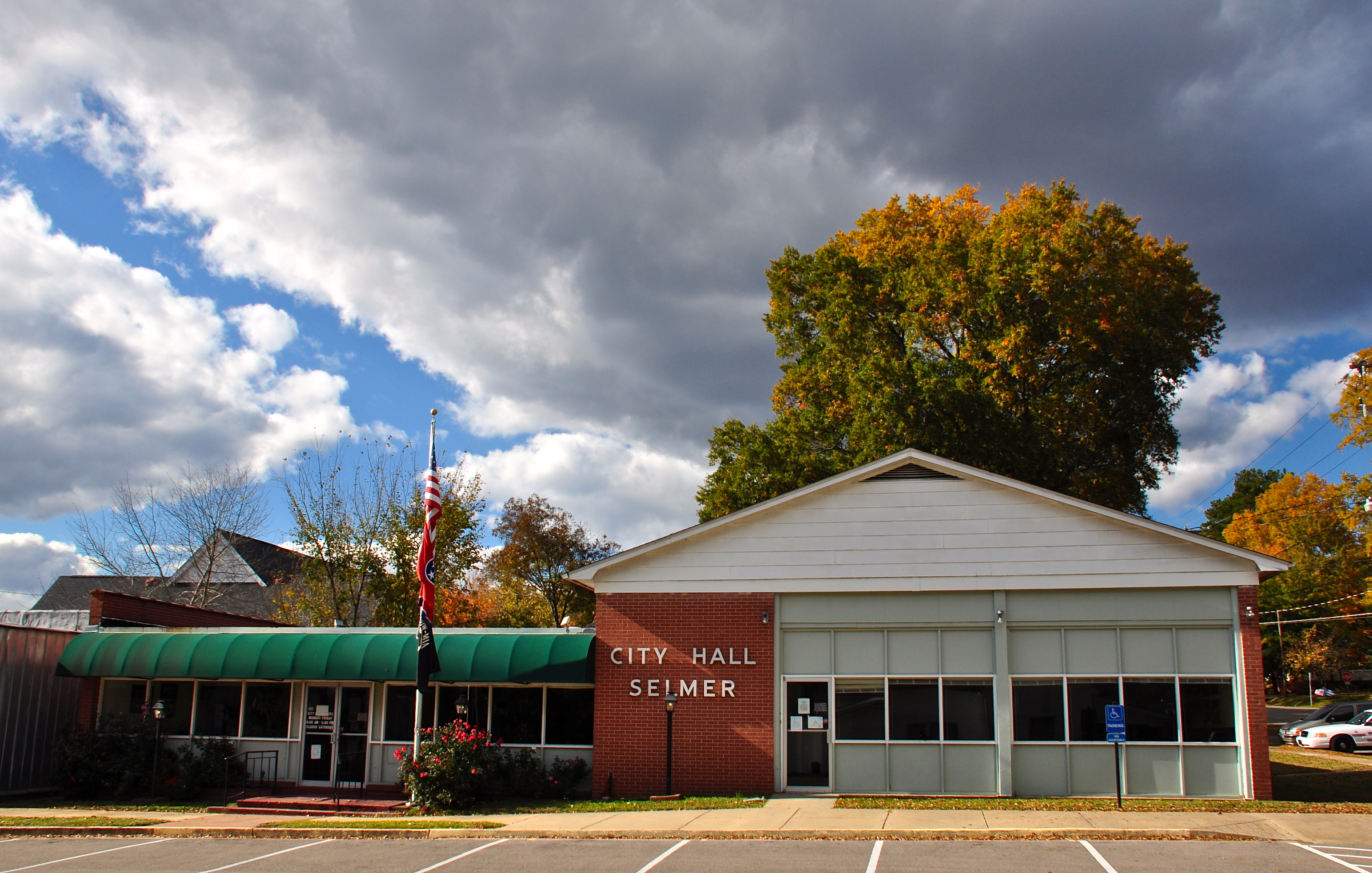
- Selmer City Hall (2013)

- Location within McNairy County and Tennessee
- Coordinates: 35°10′20″N 88°35′35″W
- Country: United States
- State: Tennessee
- County: McNairy
- Incorporated: 1901
- Named after: Selma, Alabama

Government
  - Mayor: John Smith

Area
  - Total: 9.57 sq mi (24.79 km^{2})
  - Land: 9.55 sq mi (24.73 km^{2})
  - Water: 0.019 sq mi (0.05 km^{2})
- Elevation: 449 ft (137 m)

Population (2020)
  - Total: 4,446
  - Density: 465.6/sq mi (179.76/km^{2})
- Time zone: UTC-6 (Central (CST))
  - Summer (DST): UTC-5 (CDT)
- ZIP code: 38375
- Area code: 731
- FIPS code: 47-66940
- GNIS feature ID: 1301051
- Website: townofselmer.com

Selmer is a city in and the county seat of McNairy County, Tennessee, United States, in the southwestern part of the state. As of the 2020 census, the population of the city was 4,446.

== History ==
The community is named after Selma, Alabama. It incorporated in 1901.

On June 16, 2007, a Pro Modified drag racing car driven by Troy Warren Critchley lost control while performing a burnout routine during a car show charity parade on Mulberry Avenue in downtown Selmer. His car left the road and struck part of the crowd attending a charity parade for "America Can! Cars For Kids". Six young people were killed (two died at the scene of the accident, and four died later at hospitals), and 20 others were injured. Lawsuits filed against the city and event organizers asked for more than $US 85 million in damages. The City of Selmer approved a $500,000 settlement in September 2011. On March 4, 2008, the McNairy County grand jury returned an indictment against Critchley on six counts of vehicular homicide due to recklessness, a Class C felony, and 22 counts of reckless aggravated assault, a Class D felony. Neither Cars for Kids nor the City of Selmer were named in the indictment. Troy Critchley pleaded guilty to 28 charges of reckless assault and was sentenced to 18 months' probation.

On July 1, 2020, heavy rainfall caused severe flooding throughout Selmer and McNairy County. The mayor of McNairy County, Larry Smith, declared a state of emergency after homes, businesses, and public infrastructure were flooded. More than 20 people were rescued from the floodwaters, approximately 50 buildings sustained damage, and McNairy County's E-911 Communication Center had to be evacuated. Due to the damage to the dispatch center, emergency calls were temporarily rerouted to Hardin County Tennessee's emergency communication center. Several residents were forced to evacuate their homes, and the American Red Cross provided temporary hotel accommodations for displaced families.

On April 3, 2025, an EF3 tornado struck the city in the early hours, killing five people and injuring fourteen others. The city lost an estimated $27.6 million in property damage. The tornado touched down in Downtown and Oak Hill neighborhoods destroying multiple homes and buildings.

== Geography ==
Selmer is located at 35°10′20″N 88°35′35″W (35.172333, -88.592964).

According to the United States Census Bureau, the city has a total area of 9.8 square miles (25 km^{2}), all land.

=== Neighborhoods ===
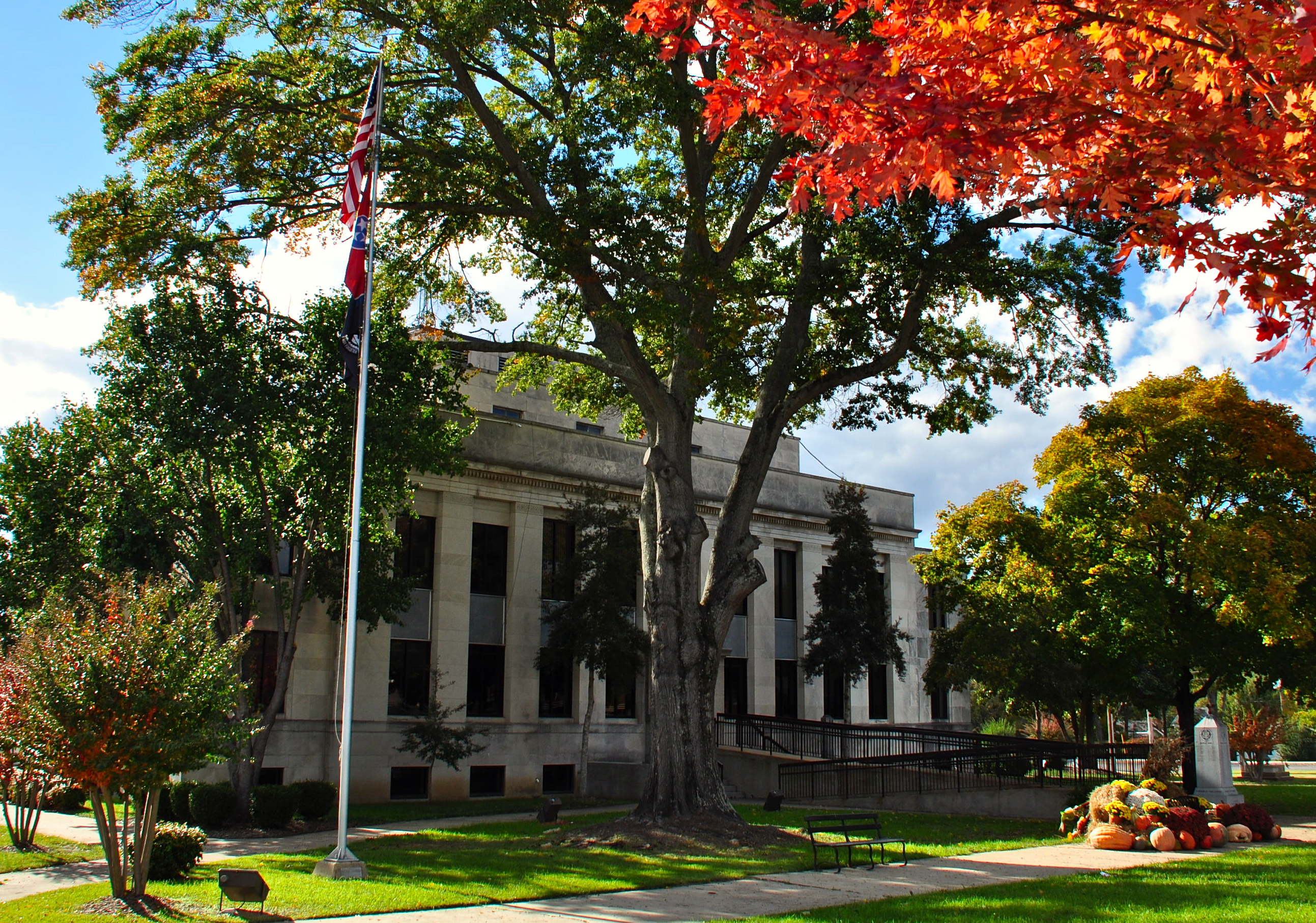
McNairy County Courthouse (2013)

Downtown is a neighborhood in the heart of Selmer, often referred to as "the main drag of Selmer", this historic neighborhood is also the site of McNairy County Historical Museum, Selmer City Police Department, Selmer Civic Center, First Baptist Church, The Latta Theatre, and many more historic buildings, the Civic Center and the Latta Theatre and the police department are all operated by the city.

Eastside is a neighborhood in East Selmer, this neighborhood is the site of Eastside Church Of Christ and McNairy Central High School. the church is operated by the city, but the school is operated by McNairy County School Board.

Eaglewood is a neighborhood in Northeast Selmer, it is the site of Chip-A-Roos and Eaglewood III Estates, the recreational facility and the apartment complex are operated by the city.

Falcon is a neighborhood in South Selmer, this neighborhood is the site of the Falcon Church, Falcon Cemetery, City of Selmer Fire Department, Owl Creek Lumber, Phillips 66, and McNairy County Sheriff's Office, the church, the cemetery, the fire department, Owl Creek Lumber, Phillips 66, and the sheriff's office are all operated by the city.

Lakeview is a neighborhood in West Selmer, this neighborhood is the site of Lakeview Church, First United Methodist Church, and Selmer Golf & Country Club, both churches and the country club are operated by the city.

Oak Hill is a neighborhood in North Selmer, the majority African-American neighborhood is the site of Oak Hill Cemetery, North Selmer Fire Station, Selmer Second Baptist Church, and Monogram Refrigeration LLC, Monogram and Oak Hill Cemetery and the fire department are all operated by the city.

Rosewood is a neighborhood in Southwest Selmer, Tennessee, this neighborhood is the site of what used to be Sweats Trailer Park Mobile Home Park, it is also the location of Purdy Place Apartments, and Rosewood Place Apartments, both high income apartment complexes operated in the city.

=== Climate ===
Climate data for Selmer, Tennessee (1991–2020 normals, extremes 1958–present)
Month	Jan	Feb	Mar	Apr	May	Jun	Jul	Aug	Sep	Oct	Nov	Dec	Year
Record high °F (°C)	78 (26)	84 (29)	89 (32)	92 (33)	96 (36)	107 (42)	106 (41)	107 (42)	101 (38)	97 (36)	87 (31)	77 (25)	107 (42)
Mean daily maximum °F (°C)	49.1 (9.5)	53.7 (12.1)	62.8 (17.1)	72.7 (22.6)	80.3 (26.8)	87.4 (30.8)	90.3 (32.4)	89.7 (32.1)	84.3 (29.1)	73.8 (23.2)	61.8 (16.6)	51.9 (11.1)	71.5 (21.9)
Daily mean °F (°C)	39.3 (4.1)	43.1 (6.2)	51.4 (10.8)	60.4 (15.8)	68.9 (20.5)	76.5 (24.7)	79.8 (26.6)	78.8 (26.0)	72.6 (22.6)	61.1 (16.2)	50.1 (10.1)	42.2 (5.7)	60.4 (15.8)
Mean daily minimum °F (°C)	29.5 (−1.4)	32.5 (0.3)	39.9 (4.4)	48.2 (9.0)	57.6 (14.2)	65.7 (18.7)	69.3 (20.7)	67.8 (19.9)	60.8 (16.0)	48.5 (9.2)	38.4 (3.6)	32.5 (0.3)	49.2 (9.6)
Record low °F (°C)	−21 (−29)	−11 (−24)	7 (−14)	22 (−6)	29 (−2)	39 (4)	47 (8)	45 (7)	30 (−1)	22 (−6)	5 (−15)	−14 (−26)	−21 (−29)
Average precipitation inches (mm)	4.69 (119)	5.30 (135)	5.75 (146)	5.64 (143)	5.36 (136)	4.79 (122)	5.17 (131)	3.84 (98)	4.35 (110)	4.14 (105)	4.37 (111)	5.66 (144)	59.06 (1,500)
Average snowfall inches (cm)	0.3 (0.76)	0.4 (1.0)	0.2 (0.51)	0.1 (0.25)	0.0 (0.0)	0.0 (0.0)	0.0 (0.0)	0.0 (0.0)	0.0 (0.0)	0.0 (0.0)	0.0 (0.0)	0.0 (0.0)	1.0 (2.5)
Average precipitation days (≥ 0.01 in)	11.5	11.2	11.8	10.5	11.1	9.6	9.7	8.6	6.8	7.3	9.5	11.5	119.1
Average snowy days (≥ 0.1 in)	0.3	0.3	0.1	0.1	0.0	0.0	0.0	0.0	0.0	0.0	0.0	0.0	0.8
Source: NOAA

== Demographics ==
Historical population
Census	Pop.	Note	%±
1900	588		—
1910	529		−10.0%
1920	546		3.2%
1930	925		69.4%
1940	957		3.5%
1950	1,759		83.8%
1960	1,897		7.8%
1970	3,495		84.2%
1980	3,979		13.8%
1990	3,838		−3.5%
2000	4,541		18.3%
2010	4,396		−3.2%
2020	4,446		1.1%

=== 2020 census ===
Selmer, Tennessee – Racial and ethnic composition Note: the US Census treats Hispanic/Latino as an ethnic category. This table excludes Latinos from the racial categories and assigns them to a separate category. Hispanics/Latinos may be of any race.
Race / Ethnicity (NH = Non-Hispanic)	Pop 2000	Pop 2010	Pop 2020	% 2000	% 2010	% 2020
White alone (NH)	3,657	3,545	3,425	80.53%	80.64%	77.04%
Black or African American alone (NH)	722	636	658	15.90%	14.47%	14.80%
Native American or Alaska Native alone (NH)	8	14	14	0.18%	0.32%	0.31%
Asian alone (NH)	12	22	25	0.26%	0.50%	0.56%
Pacific Islander alone (NH)	0	0	0	0.00%	0.00%	0.00%
Some Other Race alone (NH)	0	1	11	0.00%	0.02%	0.25%
Mixed Race or Multi-Racial (NH)	72	87	203	1.59%	1.98%	4.57%
Hispanic or Latino (any race)	70	91	110	1.54%	2.07%	2.47%
Total	4,541	4,396	4,446	100.00%	100.00%	100.00%

As of the 2020 United States census, there were 4,446 people, 1,669 households, and 1,104 families residing in the city.

As of the census of 2020, there were 4,446 people, 1,783 households, and 1,069 families residing in the city. The racial makeup of the city was 77.81% White, 14.82% African American, 0.31% Native American, 0.56% Asian, 1.21% from other races, and 5.27% from two or more races. Hispanic or Latino of any race were 2.47% of the population.

There were 1,783 households, out of which 20.2% had children under the age of 18 living with them, 39.4% were married couples living together, 27.0% had a female householder with no husband present, and 20.3% were non-families. 14.6% had someone living alone who was 65 years of age or older. The average household size was 2.37 and the average family size was 3.21.

In the city, the population was spread out, with 18.9% under the age of 18, 7.4% from 18 to 24, 31.1% from 25 to 44, 25% from 45 to 64, and 17.5% who were 65 years of age or older. The median age was 38.6 years. For every 100 females, there were 114.8 males.

The median income for a household in the city was $46,696, and the median income for a family was $68,503. Males living alone had a median income of $45,412 versus $19,075 for females. The per capita income for the city was $21,350. About 14.3% of families and 18.5% of the population were below the poverty line, including 9.2% of those under age 18 and 23.6% of those age 65 or over.

== Arts and culture ==
=== Annual cultural events ===
The Rockabilly Highway Revival is an annual event held in downtown Selmer to commemorate its rich musical heritage.

== Government ==
Selmer, Tennessee, operates under a municipal governance system consisting of a Mayor and a Board of Aldermen, all of whom are elected officials. Unlike some municipalities where Aldermen represent specific districts or wards, Selmer's Aldermen serve the city at large. The Mayor, along with the Aldermen, oversees various aspects of local governance, including public services, infrastructure development, and community initiatives.

== Education ==
=== Primary schools ===
- McNairy Central High School
- Selmer Middle School
- Selmer Elementary School

=== Secondary schools ===
- Selmer/McNairy County University of Tennessee at Martin Satellite Campus

== Infrastructure ==
=== Major highways ===
The major highways U.S. routes 64 (east-west), and 45 (north-south) intersect in the city, making it an important crossroads. In 2009, the Tennessee Legislature designated Highway 45 South, between Interstate 40 and the Mississippi state line, Rockabilly Highway in recognition of the region's contributions to the development of rockabilly music.

=== Railroad ===
The railroad that runs through the city is owned by Class 1 railroad, Norfolk Southern, and is operated by West Tennessee Railroad. The Selmer Station was built in 1925 and operated as a passenger station until 1958.

=== Robert Sibley Airport ===
The Robert Sibley Airport (IATA airport code SZY (ICAO: KSZY)) is located in the area, with no ATC, a 5,002-foot (1,525 m) runway, and at 610 feet (190 m) above sea level. The UN/LOCODE for the city is USSQE.

== Media ==
=== Newspapers ===
The oldest existing business in McNairy County is newspaper publisher, Independent Appeal, which was founded in 1902. The Independent Appeal discontinued the print edition of its newspapers on December 28, 2022, and transitioned to a strictly online presence.

The McNairy County News began publication in 2009. The paper has an online presence at mcnairycountynews.com and a Facebook page, as well as a weekly printed publication each Thursday.

=== Radio broadcasting ===
FM stations

- WXKV 90.5 Contemporary Christian
- WWGM 93.9 Mix

AM station

- WDTM 1150 Southern Gospel

== Notable people ==
- Ray Bodiford, Tennessee politician
- Chad Harville, baseball pitcher who pitched for four teams over parts of six seasons
- Buford Pusser, served as the sheriff of McNairy County from 1964 to 1970. Selmer, as the county seat, is the location of the courthouse and old jail, which was his base of operations. His story has been made famous in the Walking Tall movies starring Joe Don Baker and Bo Svenson. The movies were filmed in nearby Henderson.
