= Colosseum Mall =

Coordinates: 44°29′39″N 26°00′46″E

- Location: Bucharest, Romania
- Address: 284 Șoseaua Chitilei, Sector 1, Bucharest
- Opened: 2011
- Developer: (Romania) Nova Imobiliare
- Architect: Leach Rhodes Walker (Manchester)
- Floor area: 53,000 m^{2} (570,000 sq ft)
- Floors: 1
- Website: thecolosseum.ro

Colosseum is a retail park in Bucharest, Romania, located in the northwestern part of the city, near Chitila. There were also plans for the construction of a shopping mall from 2014 and this was finally opened in March 2022.
