= Corinth, Mississippi =

City in Mississippi, United States

- City
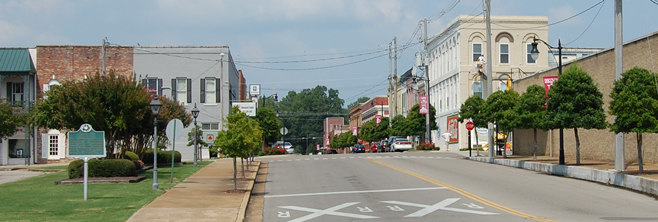
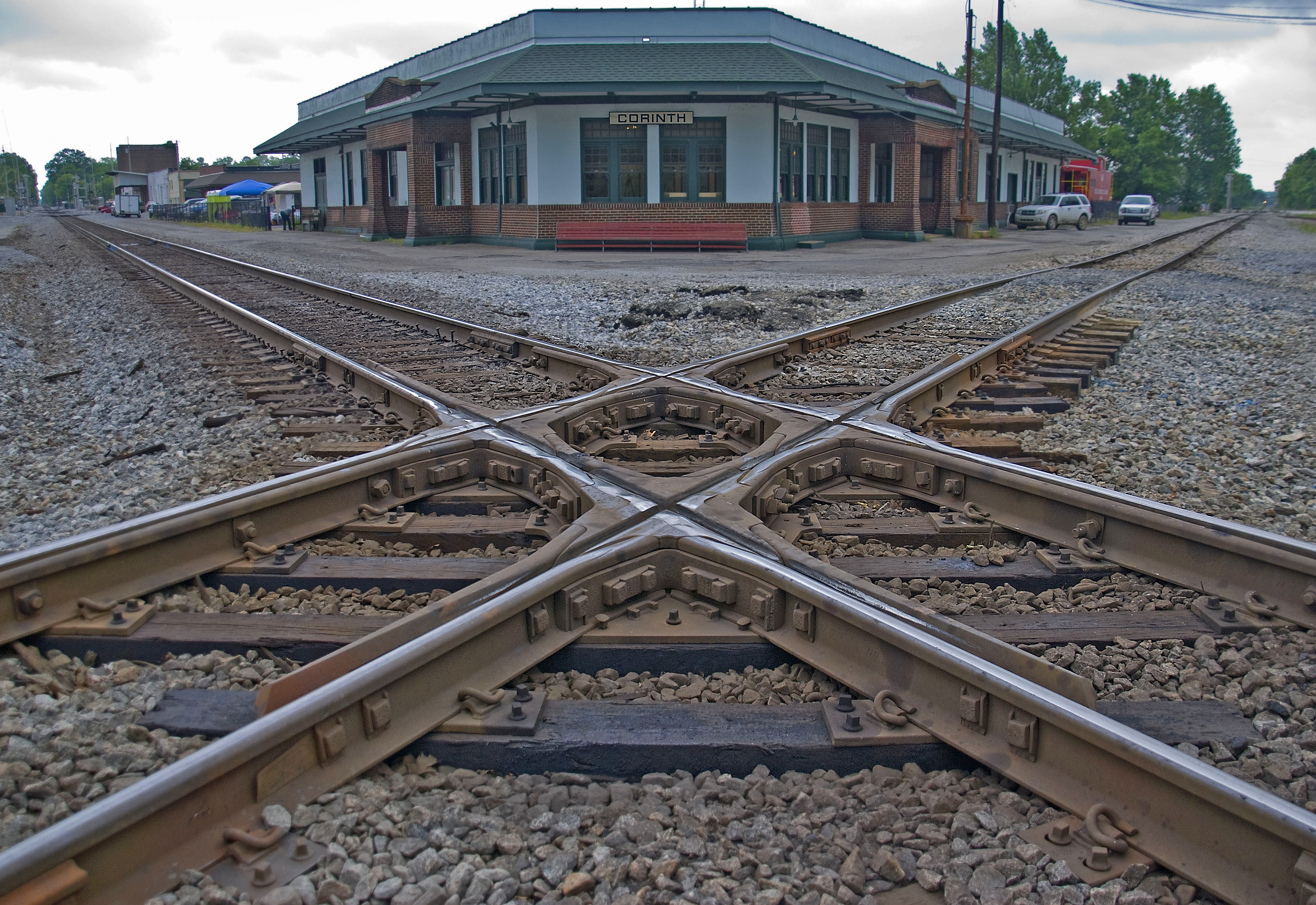
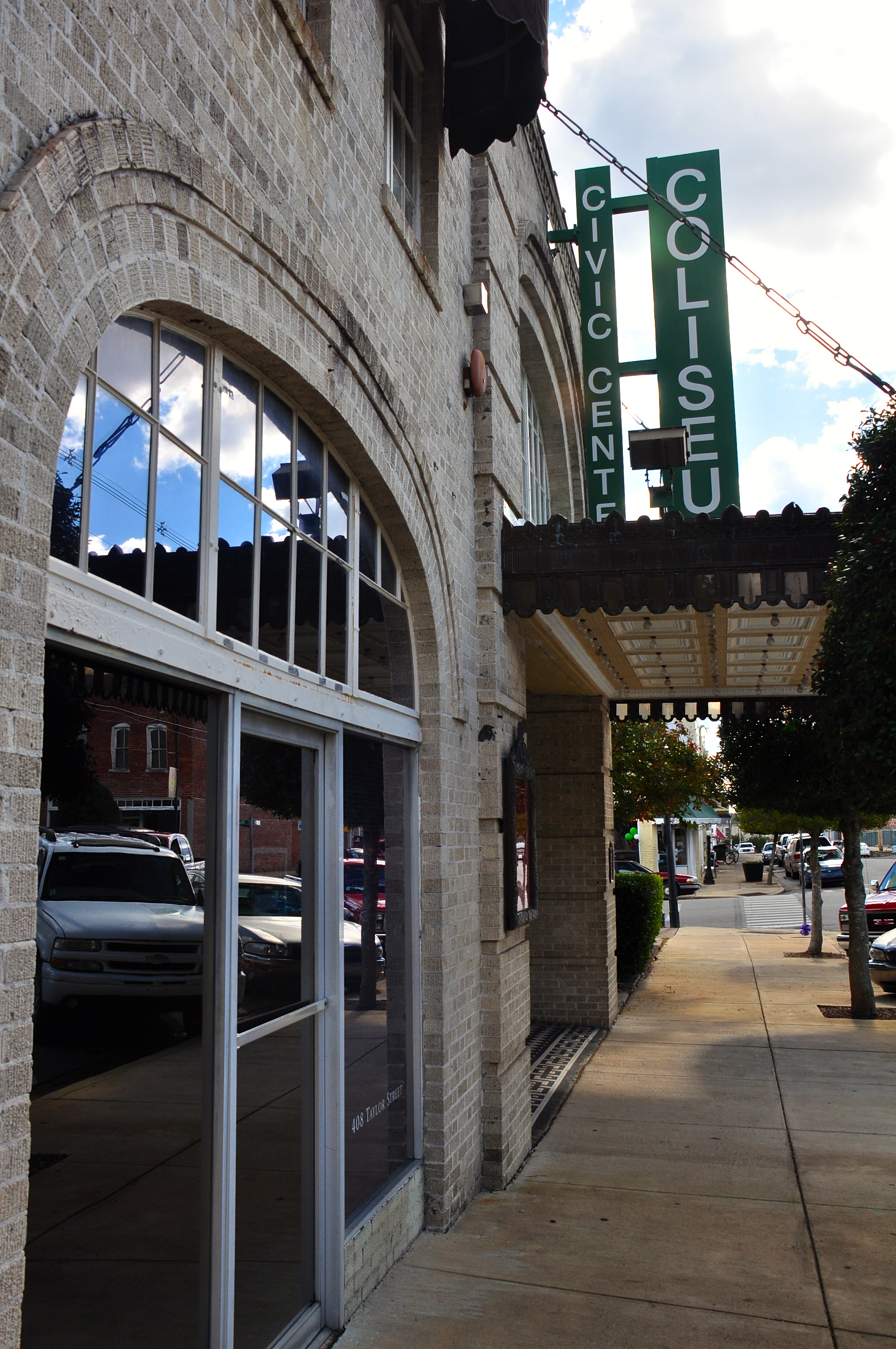
- Downtown Corinth Crossroads Museum Coliseum Theatre

- Flag Seal
- Nickname: Crossroads of the South
- Motto: Pride, Service
- Location in Alcorn County and Mississippi

- Location in the United States
- Coordinates: 34°56′50″N 88°30′12″W
- Country: United States
- State: Mississippi
- County: Alcorn
- Founded: 1853
- Incorporated: March 12, 1856
- Named for: Corinth, Greece

Government
  - Mayor: Ralph Dance (R)

Area
  - Total: 30.29 sq mi (78.44 km^{2})
  - Land: 30.16 sq mi (78.12 km^{2})
  - Water: 0.12 sq mi (0.32 km^{2})
- Elevation: 495 ft (151 m)

Population (2020)
  - Total: 14,622
  - Density: 484.8/sq mi (187.18/km^{2})
- Demonym: Corinthian
- Time zone: UTC−6 (Central (CST))
  - Summer (DST): UTC−5 (CDT)
- ZIP codes: 38834–38835
- Area code: 662
- FIPS code: 28-15700
- GNIS feature ID: 2404132
- Website: corinthms.gov

Corinth is a city in and the county seat of Alcorn County, Mississippi, United States. The population was 14,622 at the 2020 census. Its ZIP codes are 38834 and 38835. It lies on the state line with Tennessee.

== History ==
Established in 1853, Corinth was first named Cross City for its location at the junction of the Mobile & Ohio and Memphis & Charleston railroads, it was renamed Corinth after the famous Greek crossroads city. Because of the town’s strategic location, it was a center of contention between Union and Confederate forces during the Civil War and was ultimately occupied by Union troops from 1862 to 1864.

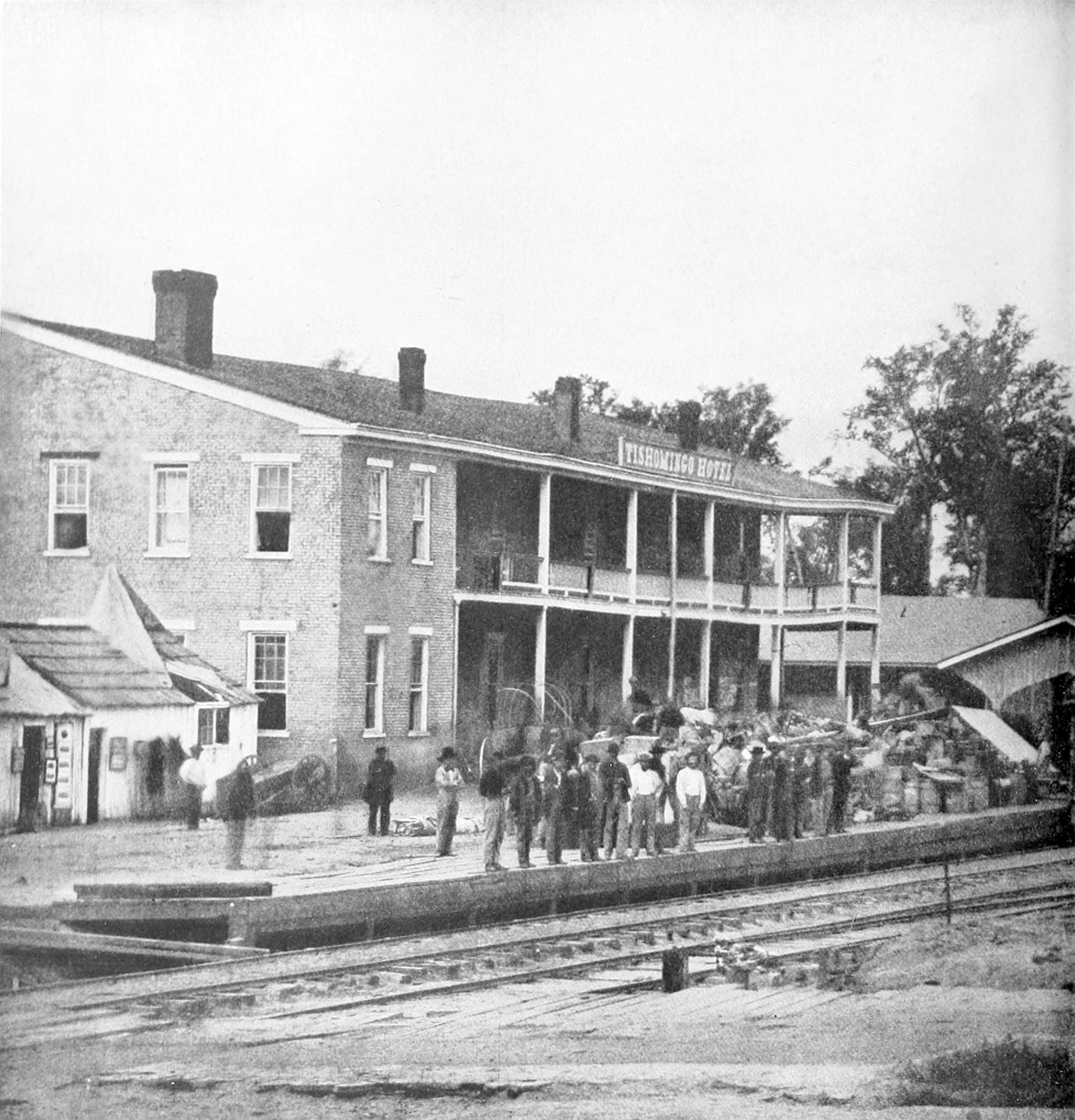
The Tishomingo Hotel, c. 1862.

Confederate General P. G. T. Beauregard retreated to Corinth after the Battle of Shiloh (April 1862), pursued by Union Major General Henry W. Halleck. General Beauregard abandoned the town on May 29 when General Halleck approached, letting it fall into the Union's hands. Since Halleck had approached so cautiously, digging entrenchments at every stop for over a month, this action has been known as the Siege of Corinth.

The Union sent Maj. Gen. William Rosecrans to Corinth as well and concentrated its forces in the city. The Second Battle of Corinth took place on October 3−4, 1862, when Confederate Maj. Gen. Earl Van Dorn attempted to retake the city. Corinth ultimately became a destination for refugees from slavery called contrabands and their camp was "widely regarded as a 'model' camp."

=== Locales on the National Register of Historic Places ===
- Battery Williams (also known as Fort Williams)
- Siege and Battle of Corinth Sites
- Coliseum Theatre- built in the early 20th century in the Colonial Revival style
- Corinth National Cemetery
- Downtown Corinth Historic District
- Dr. Joseph M. Bynum House—a home in the Late Gothic Revival style built in the late 19th century
- Federal Siege Trench (also known as Harper Road Trench)
- Fort Robinette (also known as Battery Robinette)—site of the Civil War Interpretive Center
- Jacinto Courthouse (also called the Old Tishomingo County Courthouse)—built in the mid-19th century in the Federal style
- L.C. Steele House
- Midtown Corinth Historic District
- Moores Creek site—a prehistoric Native American site from 3000 to 3500 B.C.
- Old U.S. Post Office
- Rienzi Commercial Historic District
- Thomas F. Dilworth House
- Union Battery F, Battle of Corinth
- Union Earthworks
- Veranda House (also known as the Curlee House)—built in 1857, it served as headquarters for Confederate generals during the Battle of Corinth

== Geography ==
Corinth is located in northeast Mississippi at the intersection of (north/south) U.S. Route 45 and (east/west) U.S. Route 72. U.S. 45 runs to the west of the city as a bypass, leading north 19 mi (31 km) to Selmer, Tennessee, and south 21 mi (34 km) to Booneville. U.S. 72 runs through the southern part of the city, leading southeast 14 mi (23 km) to Burnsville and west 23 mi (37 km) to Walnut. It is the county seat of Alcorn County, which is the smallest county by area in the state of Mississippi.

According to the United States Census Bureau, the city has a total area of 30.3 square miles (78.4 km^{2}), of which 30.2 square miles (78.1 km^{2}) is land and 0.12 square miles (0.3 km^{2}), or 0.43%, is water.

Downtown Corinth (2026)

=== Communities near Corinth ===
- Eastview, Tennessee, 9.85 miles (15.85 km)
- Farmington, 3.97 miles (6.39 km)
- Guys, Tennessee, 7.24 miles (11.65 km)
- Kossuth, 8.21 miles (13.21 km)
- Michie, Tennessee, 9.75 miles (15.69 km)
- Ramer, Tennessee, 10.92 miles (17.57 km)
- Selmer, Tennessee, 17.28 miles (27.81 km)

=== Rivers and streams ===
- Bridge Creek
- Elam Creek
- Phillips Creek
- Turner Creek

=== Climate ===
The climate is humid subtropical (Köppen: Cfa) like all of Mississippi but with frequent and regular gusts of snow.

Climate data for Corinth, Mississippi (1991–2020 normals, extremes 1895–present)
Month	Jan	Feb	Mar	Apr	May	Jun	Jul	Aug	Sep	Oct	Nov	Dec	Year
Record high °F (°C)	80 (27)	86 (30)	89 (32)	97 (36)	100 (38)	106 (41)	111 (44)	110 (43)	105 (41)	96 (36)	88 (31)	80 (27)	111 (44)
Mean daily maximum °F (°C)	49.2 (9.6)	54.0 (12.2)	63.0 (17.2)	72.6 (22.6)	80.2 (26.8)	86.9 (30.5)	90.0 (32.2)	89.7 (32.1)	84.5 (29.2)	73.7 (23.2)	61.4 (16.3)	52.1 (11.2)	71.4 (21.9)
Daily mean °F (°C)	39.8 (4.3)	43.7 (6.5)	51.6 (10.9)	60.5 (15.8)	69.2 (20.7)	76.5 (24.7)	79.9 (26.6)	78.9 (26.1)	72.5 (22.5)	61.0 (16.1)	49.6 (9.8)	42.6 (5.9)	60.5 (15.8)
Mean daily minimum °F (°C)	30.4 (−0.9)	33.5 (0.8)	40.1 (4.5)	48.4 (9.1)	58.2 (14.6)	66.0 (18.9)	69.7 (20.9)	68.0 (20.0)	60.5 (15.8)	48.2 (9.0)	37.7 (3.2)	33.2 (0.7)	49.5 (9.7)
Record low °F (°C)	−19 (−28)	−6 (−21)	9 (−13)	25 (−4)	35 (2)	43 (6)	51 (11)	47 (8)	33 (1)	21 (−6)	4 (−16)	−6 (−21)	−19 (−28)
Average precipitation inches (mm)	4.89 (124)	5.01 (127)	5.42 (138)	5.54 (141)	5.67 (144)	5.02 (128)	4.57 (116)	3.57 (91)	4.12 (105)	4.26 (108)	4.43 (113)	6.32 (161)	58.82 (1,494)
Average snowfall inches (cm)	0.4 (1.0)	0.3 (0.76)	0.0 (0.0)	0.0 (0.0)	0.0 (0.0)	0.0 (0.0)	0.0 (0.0)	0.0 (0.0)	0.0 (0.0)	0.0 (0.0)	0.0 (0.0)	0.0 (0.0)	0.7 (1.8)
Average precipitation days (≥ 0.01 in)	9.8	9.0	10.1	9.2	9.4	8.9	8.9	7.4	5.4	7.0	8.0	10.2	103.3
Average snowy days (≥ 0.1 in)	0.3	0.1	0.1	0.0	0.0	0.0	0.0	0.0	0.0	0.0	0.0	0.0	0.5
Source: NOAA

== Demographics ==
Historical population
Census	Pop.	Note	%±
1870	1,512		—
1880	2,275		50.5%
1890	2,111		−7.2%
1900	3,661		73.4%
1910	5,020		37.1%
1920	5,498		9.5%
1930	6,220		13.1%
1940	7,818		25.7%
1950	9,785		25.2%
1960	11,453		17.0%
1970	11,581		1.1%
1980	13,180		13.8%
1990	11,820		−10.3%
2000	14,054		18.9%
2010	14,573		3.7%
2020	14,622		0.3%
U.S. Decennial Census

=== Racial and ethnic composition ===
Corinth city, Mississippi – Racial and ethnic composition Note: the US Census treats Hispanic/Latino as an ethnic category. This table excludes Latinos from the racial categories and assigns them to a separate category. Hispanics/Latinos may be of any race.
Race / Ethnicity (NH = Non-Hispanic)	Pop 2000	Pop 2010	Pop 2020	% 2000	% 2010	% 2020
White alone (NH)	10,616	10,163	9,477	75.54%	69.74%	64.81%
Black or African American alone (NH)	3,023	3,374	3,570	21.51%	23.15%	24.42%
Native American or Alaska Native alone (NH)	12	18	33	0.09%	0.12%	0.23%
Asian alone (NH)	49	74	121	0.35%	0.51%	0.83%
Native Hawaiian or Pacific Islander alone (NH)	12	3	10	0.09%	0.02%	0.07%
Other race alone (NH)	12	10	23	0.09%	0.07%	0.16%
Mixed race or Multiracial (NH)	87	162	508	0.62%	1.11%	3.47%
Hispanic or Latino (any race)	243	769	880	1.73%	5.28%	6.02%
Total	14,054	14,573	14,622	100.00%	100.00%	100.00%

=== 2020 census ===
As of the 2020 census, Corinth had a population of 14,622. The median age was 39.7 years. 23.7% of residents were under the age of 18 and 20.1% of residents were 65 years of age or older. For every 100 females there were 90.7 males, and for every 100 females age 18 and over there were 88.5 males age 18 and over.

79.2% of residents lived in urban areas, while 20.8% lived in rural areas.

There were 6,145 households in Corinth, including 3,555 families. Of all households, 29.1% had children under the age of 18 living in them, 34.6% were married-couple households, 19.7% were households with a male householder and no spouse or partner present, and 39.8% were households with a female householder and no spouse or partner present. About 36.4% of all households were made up of individuals, and 17.2% had someone living alone who was 65 years of age or older.

There were 6,976 housing units, of which 11.9% were vacant. The homeowner vacancy rate was 1.9% and the rental vacancy rate was 9.0%.

Racial composition as of the 2020 census
Race	Number	Percent
White	9,614	65.8%
Black or African American	3,585	24.5%
American Indian and Alaska Native	72	0.5%
Asian	122	0.8%
Native Hawaiian and Other Pacific Islander	10	0.1%
Some other race	549	3.8%
Two or more races	670	4.6%

=== 2000 census ===
As of the census of 2000, there were 14,054 people, 6,220 households, and 3,800 families residing in the city. The population density was 461.5 people per square mile (178.2 people/km^{2}). There were 7,058 housing units at an average density of 231.8 per square mile (89.5/km^{2}). The racial makeup of the city was 76.28% White, 21.60% African American, 0.09% Native American, 0.36% Asian, 0.12% Pacific Islander, 0.84% from other races, and 0.73% from two or more races. Hispanic or Latino of any race were 1.73% of the population.

There were 6,220 households, out of which 26.0% had children under the age of 18 living with them, 42.9% were married couples living together, 14.8% had a female householder with no husband present, and 38.9% were non-families. Of all households, 35.6% were made up of individuals, and 16.0% had someone living alone who was 65 years of age or older. The average household size was 2.19 and the average family size was 2.82.

In the city, the population was spread out, with 21.8% under the age of 18, 9.3% from 18 to 24, 25.6% from 25 to 44, 23.7% from 45 to 64, and 19.6% who were 65 years of age or older. The median age was 40 years. For every 100 females, there were 85.5 males. For every 100 females age 18 and over, there were 81.0 males.

The median income for a household in the city was $23,436, and the median income for a family was $35,232. Males had a median income of $29,027 versus $21,071 for females. The per capita income for the city was $15,452. About 18.2% of families and 22.2% of the population were below the poverty line, including 26.2% of those under age 18 and 23.9% of those age 65 or over.

== Economy ==
Key Tronic has a printed circuit board assembly plant in Corinth. Keytronic acquired this Ayrshire Electronics facility in 2014, which previously opened in 1961.

== Education ==
=== Public schools ===
Corinth School District:

- Corinth High School—grades 9–12 with an enrollment of 473
- Corinth Middle School-grades 5–8 with an enrollment of 265
- Corinth Elementary School—grades K–4
- Easom High School (the only African American school in the city before desegregation; Became home of South Corinth Elementary School teaching 5th and 6th Grade until the 2009–2010 school year, when it ceased to be used until 2014 when a health clinic opened in the building)

Alcorn School District:

- Alcorn Alternative School
- Alcorn Central Elementary—grades K–4, with enrollment of 520
- Alcorn Central Middle School—grades 5–8 with an enrollment of 539
- Alcorn Central High School—grades 9–12 with an enrollment of 515
- Biggersville Elementary—grades K–6 with an enrollment of 161
- Biggersville High School—grades 7–12 with an enrollment of 236
- Kossuth Elementary School—grades K–4 with an enrollment of 562
- Kossuth High School—grades 9–12 with an enrollment of 438
- Kossuth Middle School—grades 5–8 with an enrollment of 499

=== Libraries ===
- Corinth Public Library—part of the Northeast Regional Library System

=== Museums ===
- Northeast Mississippi Museum
- Corinth Civil War Interpretive Center (part of the National Park Service)
- Historic Corinth Depot and Crossroads Museum
- Artist Guild Museum and Shop
- Museum of Southern Culture
- Black History Museum

== Health care ==
- Veranda Health Center
- Magnolia Regional Health Center

== Transportation ==
=== Highways ===
- U.S. Route 45—runs north–south from Lake Superior to the Gulf of Mexico
- U.S. Route 72—runs east–west from Chattanooga, Tennessee to Memphis
- Mississippi Highway 2—runs southwest from the Tennessee state line to Hickory Flat
- Mississippi Highway 145

=== Air travel ===
Roscoe Turner Airport is a general aviation airport just outside Corinth. The nearest airports with regularly scheduled commercial service are Tupelo Regional Airport, about 54 miles (87 km) south of Corinth, and Memphis International Airport, about 90 miles (140 km) west of Corinth.

== Media ==
=== Newspapers ===
- Daily Corinthian

=== FM and AM radio stations ===
- WKCU 1350, Country music
- WXRZ 94.3, News and Talk / Supertalk Mississippi (Mississippi political and local)
- WADI 95.3, 95.5 The Bee (Country)
- Radio Mexico 107.9 (Spanish)

== Notable people ==
- Neal Brooks Biggers Jr., federal judge
- Don Blasingame, baseball player
- Bob the Drag Queen, drag queen
- Ezekiel S. Candler Jr., U.S. congressman
- Bert Cumby, Army intelligence officer
- Larry Dorsey, football coach
- Bobby Emmons, songwriter and keyboardist of The Memphis Boys
- Steve Gaines, pastor
- Frances Gaither, novelist
- George Grace, linguist
- Philip Henson, scout and spy
- R. Anthony Inman, academic
- Etheridge Knight, poet
- Peggy Smith Martin, Illinois state representative
- Jimbo Mathus, musician
- Thomas K. McCraw, educator
- Maty Noyes, singer
- John F. Osborne, editor and journalist
- Rubel Phillips, politician
- Thomas Hal Phillips, author
- J.E. Pitts, poet and songwriter
- Saving Abel, rock band
- Everett Sharp, football player
- Jackie Simpson, professional football player.
- Orma Rinehart Smith, federal judge
- John Benjamin Splann, Mississippi state senator
- Roscoe Turner, aviator
- Jack Yarber, musician

== See also ==
- Corinth Depot
- Johnny Vomit & The Dry Heaves - a garage band from Corinth
- Slugburger
