= Hornsby, Tennessee =

- Town
- Location of Hornsby in Hardeman County, Tennessee.
- Coordinates: 35°13′36″N 88°49′47″W
- Country: United States
- State: Tennessee
- County: Hardeman, McNairy
- Chartered: 1920

Area
  - Total: 1.05 sq mi (2.72 km^{2})
  - Land: 1.05 sq mi (2.72 km^{2})
  - Water: 0 sq mi (0.00 km^{2})
- Elevation: 381 ft (116 m)

Population (2020)
  - Total: 264
  - Density: 251.0/sq mi (96.93/km^{2})
- Time zone: UTC-6 (Central (CST))
  - Summer (DST): UTC-5 (CDT)
- ZIP code: 38044
- Area code: 731
- FIPS code: 47-36080
- GNIS feature ID: 1288378

Hornsby is a town in Hardeman County and McNairy County, Tennessee. As of the 2020 census, Hornsby had a population of 264. The town is just east of Bolivar along U.S. Highway 64 .

== History ==
Before 1820, Dr. Daniel Smith Webb started a gristmill and sawmill along the Little Hatchie River in Wade Creek Valley. The area would come to be known as Webb's Mill, and in the 1820s, Joel and William Crain, two Revolutionary veterans, moved to the area and founded a port and supply depot near Webb's Mill. The area would eventually have a two churches, a subscription school, a stagecoach stop and an inn between Bolivar and Purdy. This town would be called Crainville. Crainville would become a railroad town in the early 1900s and a new train depot was built by the Gulf, Mobile and Northern Railroad on a farm owned by Kimborough Hornsby. An artesian well was drilled in 1915 near the depot and was the first of its kind in the United States. On October 16, 1920, Hornsby's charter was written and a new government was formed. The first home was built by Finley Holyfield in 1919 and by 1923 the town had earned the name "the village of artesian wells," with nine in total.

In 1971, a tornado hit Hornsby, destroying a number of homes. A number of early 20th century homes still stand in the area and the remains of Crainville are still visible just east of town.

== Geography ==
Hornsby is located at 35°13′36″N 88°49′47″W (35.226693, -88.829793).

According to the United States Census Bureau, the town has a total area of 1.3 square miles (3.4 km^{2}), all land.

== Demographics ==
Historical population
Census	Pop.	Note	%±
1930	219		—
1940	207		−5.5%
1950	280		35.3%
1960	228		−18.6%
1970	212		−7.0%
1980	401		89.2%
1990	313		−21.9%
2000	306		−2.2%
2010	303		−1.0%
2020	264		−12.9%

As of the census of 2000, there were 306 people, 123 households, and 94 families residing in the town. The population density was 242.7 inhabitants per square mile (93.7/km^{2}). There were 134 housing units at an average density of 106.3 per square mile (41.0/km^{2}). The racial makeup of the town was 97.71% White, 0.98% African American, 0.33% from other races, and 0.98% from two or more races. Hispanic or Latino of any race were 0.33% of the population.

There were 123 households, out of which 35.8% had children under the age of 18 living with them, 56.9% were married couples living together, 13.0% had a female householder with no husband present, and 22.8% were non-families. 20.3% of all households were made up of individuals, and 12.2% had someone living alone who was 65 years of age or older. The average household size was 2.49 and the average family size was 2.78.

In the town, the population was spread out, with 25.5% under the age of 18, 7.2% from 18 to 24, 29.7% from 25 to 44, 21.6% from 45 to 64, and 16.0% who were 65 years of age or older. The median age was 38 years. For every 100 females, there were 84.3 males. For every 100 females age 18 and over, there were 90.0 males.

The median income for a household in the town was $34,063, and the median income for a family was $31,250. Males had a median income of $26,875 versus $23,750 for females. The per capita income for the town was $12,915. About 23.3% of families and 17.8% of the population were below the poverty line, including 12.3% of those under the age of eighteen and 16.0% of those 65 or over.

== Arts and culture ==
=== Points of interest ===
Hornsby was historically known for its artesian well which was historically located at the former Whitehurst Motor Company. That well closed in the 1960s to the public, however, one well, the last of nine original wells in the area is open to visitors. Over 100 years old, it is located at Hornsby Elementary School.

== Education ==
The town has one elementary school: Hornsby Elementary School.
