= Oxford Creek =

Watercourse in Tennessee, United States

Coordinates: 35.122862°N 88.615605°W

Oxford Creek is a stream in McNairy County of the U.S. state of Tennessee. It is a tributary of Cypress Creek.

Oxford Creek has the name of Abel Oxford, a pioneer settler.
