= Operations Around Monterey =

- Part of the Western theater of the American Civil War
- General Ulysses S. Grant's Headquarters at Monterey (Michie, TN)
| Date | March 4, 1862 – June 30, 1862 (3 months, 3 weeks and 5 days) |
| Location | Michie, Tennessee 35°3′16″N 88°25′53″W |
| Result | Union victory |

Belligerents
| United States (Union) | Confederate States |

Commanders and leaders
| Ulysses S. Grant; Don Carlos Buell; Henry W. Halleck | Albert Sidney Johnston †; P. G. T. Beauregard |

Units involved
| Army of the Tennessee; Army of the Ohio | Army of Mississippi |

Strength
| 120,000 | 65,000 |

Casualties and losses
| 115+ | 200+ |
- Location within Tennessee

The Operations Around Monterey, Tennessee (Michie, Tennessee) were a distinct series of military activities apart of the American Civil War, occurring between March to June, 1862 in southeastern McNairy County, Tennessee. The events are a part of larger campaigns in the Western Theater, specifically the Battle of Shiloh and the Siege of Corinth.

The role that this area played in these campaigns span largely from campsites, hospitals, transportation routes, geological objectives, reconnaissance, skirmishing and occupation. The area served as a Union Army's headquarters for the majority of the Siege of Corinth and is the site of the Battle of Fallen Timbers, which took place on the last day of the Battle of Shiloh on April 8, 1862. Skirmishing became increasingly more frequent towards the end of April.

== Background ==
Historically, the community of Monterey (not be confused with Monterey, TN) dates back to the community's settlement along a series of ridges in the 1820s. In 1847, their post office was first established as "Monterey". During the War, the community lost its post office and when it re-applied in 1881, the name was already taken by a town in East Tennessee. As of today, the community is still sometimes called "Old Monterey" when referring to its Civil War-era settlement. Additionally, the Union occasionally used the term "Pea Ridge" (not to be confused with Pea Ridge, Arkansas) interchangeably to describe the strategic geological overlook and the village depending on the context.

Pea Ridge Overlook

Following Union victories at Fort Henry and Fort Donelson, Major General Ulysses S. Grant ordered the Union Army down the Tennessee River to the site of Pittsburg Landing in early March, 1862. The area was intended to be only a brief Union camp, as Grant's broader objective was the capture of the railway junction in Corinth, Mississippi. At the time, forces were being gathered in Corinth, Mississippi to defend the railways under the leadership of Confederate Commander Albert Sidney Johnston, who would later launch the attack that would become the Battle of Shiloh.

Map of Corinth to Shiloh, including Monterey (April, 1862)

== Operations (March, 1862) ==
Following the Union's arrival at Pittsburg Landing, Confederates established the first campsite in Monterey on March 4 with 9 companies of the 18th Louisiana Regiment promptly titled "Camp Bush" after Captain Louis Jean Bush. On March 16, this regiment would become scattered when the first contact between the Confederate camp and Union soldiers led by Lieut. Colonel McPherson was made at the "Skirmish of Black Jack Forest."

Later, on March 23, General Grant would send a telegram to Sherman telling him to there was to be, "...no movement…except to advance Gen. Sherman's division to prevent rebels from fortifying Pea Ridge." In a later telegram to General C.F. Smith, Grant urged Smith to, "Carry out your idea of occupying and partially fortifying Pea Ridge…I am clearly of the opinion that the enemy are gathering strength at Corinth quite as rapidly as we are here, and the sooner we attack, the easier will be the task of taking the place."

On March 24th, another skirmish occurred. During this time, Confederates stationed Joe Wheeler's 19th Alabama cavalry before being replaced by General Randal L. Gibson's brigade on April 1 under the supervision of Colonel James H. Clanton. The Confederate order to consolidate in Corinth was placed on March 29th.

== Operations (April 1 - 28, 1862 | Shiloh) ==
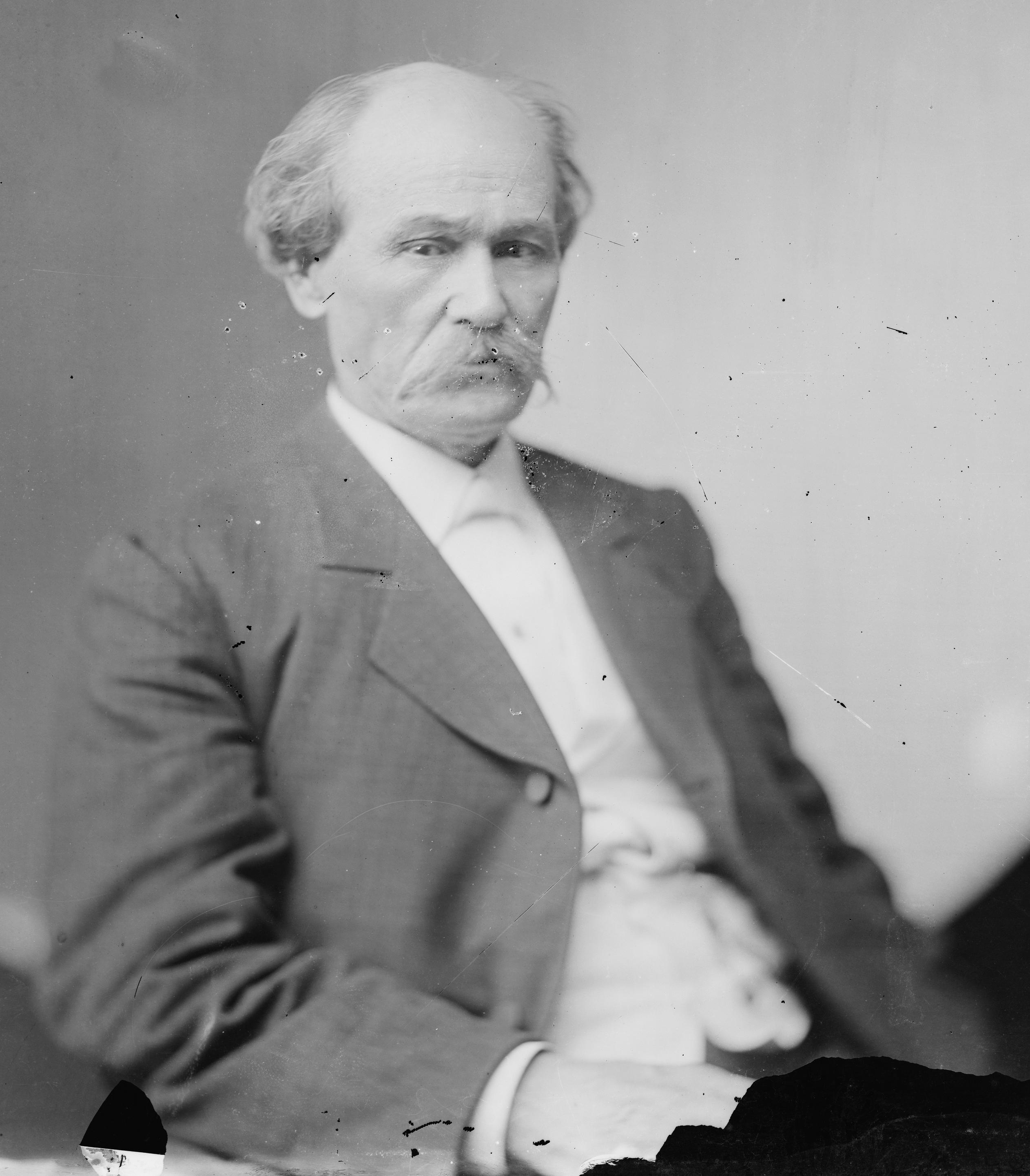
Tennessee Governor Isham G. Harris

After the Confederate order to consolidate the armies, Monterey became increasingly more important as a staging ground for the Battle of Shiloh. Monterey's roadways were repeatedly criticized, as its poor conditions were the result of being one of the most rural areas of McNairy County at the time. The order to consolidate were to assimilate the armies at Monterey and advance towards "Mickey's House" (Michie's) in preparation for the battle. Between April 1 to April 4, thousands of soldiers crossed into Monterey and bivouacked in Monterey in anticipation for the oncoming battle. Tennessee's governor, Isham G. Harris, was in attendance both at the camp before the battle and during the action.

=== Shiloh and the Battle of Fallen Timbers ===
Just before the battle on April 3 and April 4, heavy skirmishing was found around Monterey. Colonel William H. H. Taylor and the 5th Ohio Cavalry reported a charge into Confederate pickets that resulted in 1 wounded and 1 imprisoned. An estimated 200 of Colonel Buckland's men were involved in the skirmish, with about 4 wounded in the end. On April 4, Colonel Buckland's pickets would be captured by Colonel A. H. Gladden following a skirmish near Hamburg Road at around 2:00 in the afternoon. Union Major Leroy Crockett of 72nd Ohio was captured and imprisoned during this skirmish.

Confederate Commanders on the Night of April 5 at Michie's House

On April 5, Confederate Generals debated with another at Michie's House about launching the attack. Despite second-in-command P.G.T. Beauregard's advice to call off the attack, Johnston declared the attack would commence on Pittsburg Landing on April 6, 1862. Johnston would later die on the first day in the Battle of Shiloh, becoming the highest-ranking officer of either party to be killed in action in the entire Civil War.

Following two days of intense fighting, Monterey became the site of the Battle of Fallen Timbers. The Battle of Fallen Timbers was a cavalry engagement fought on April 8, 1862, during the Union pursuit of Confederate forces retreating after the Battle of Shiloh. Union troops under Major Generals William T. Sherman and Lew Wallace's command advanced to locate and capture the retreating Confederates, but were met by approximately 350 Confederate cavalrymen led by Colonel Nathan Bedford Forrest. Forrest launched a surprise charge while Sherman's men were collecting fallen trees. The ambush halted the Union's pursuit, but led to Forrest being seriously wounded during the battle. Unofficial claims from the Union report 15 killed, 25 wounded, and 53 taken prisoner while Confederates reported 66 killed, wounded or missing. Confederate-aligned sources claim up to 250 Union men. The action marked the finale to the Battle of Shiloh and helped cover the Confederate army's withdrawal toward Corinth.

=== Reconnaissance and Skirmishing ===
Burning Dead Horses After Shiloh

Monterey's primary role after Shiloh was its service as a route of retreat and as a Confederate field hospital until the beginning of the Siege of Corinth. Those captured at Shiloh and brought back to Corinth often mentioned the roadways with miles of dead men and horses. Mass grave burial operations were carried out by both the Union and the Confederacy in over 156 locations, including local cemeteries such as the Sanders' Family Cemetery.

On April 17, Union Gen. C.F. Smith sent Lieut. Colonel McCook to locate the Confederate pickets in Monterey. McCook's skirmishers found a body of 2,000 Confederates and were fired upon. At least 3 men were killed, notably First Sergeant Nathan A. Richardson and a lieutenant, and 6 horses were disabled.

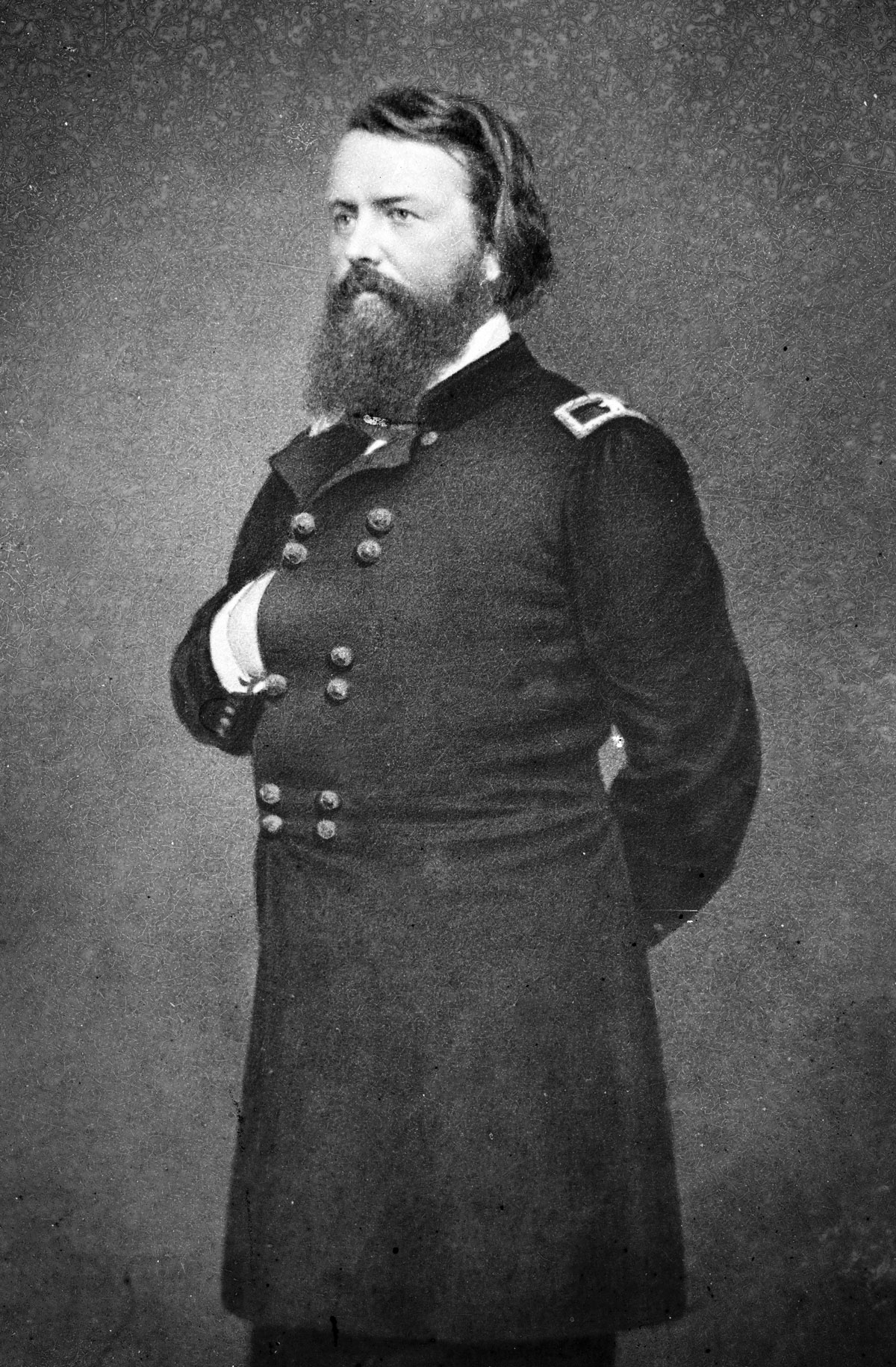
Union General John Pope

Skirmishing began to ramp up following the arrival of General John Pope at Pittsburg Landing on April 22. On April 24, another reconnaissance was made by General C.F. Smith towards the Confederate camp at Monterey. The Union withdrew from the conflict, but not without taking 27 prisoners and burning the camp. Several more reconnaissance missions were made between April 24 until April 29. On April 26, Union reconnaissance was made from entrenchments in Stantonville towards "Pea Ridge" resulting in the capture of about 9 Confederates. Another skirmish occurred near "Atkins' Mill", 1 mile east of Monterey, when Union Major Henry A. Shaw of the 2nd Michigan ordered 4 companies towards the Confederate pickets near Ephraim Atkins' Mill, resulting in 2 Union men wounded. At least three more skirmishes took place before the order to advance to Corinth. Between April 17 to April 28, at least 12 men were killed, 8 were wounded and 38 were imprisoned on either side.

== Operations (April 29 - May 30, 1862 | Siege of Corinth) ==
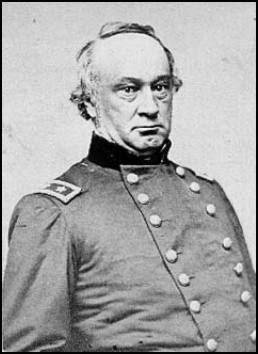
Union Major General Henry W. Halleck

Following the transition of commanding power from General Grant to General Henry W. Halleck, Halleck ordered a steady, methodical advance towards Corinth, Mississippi on April 29, 1862 that became known as the Siege of Corinth. Some of the most violent days of the siege came on the first day. The Union's objective towards Corinth would begin with capturing the camp at Monterey that held the Pea Ridge Overlook.

=== Atkins' Home Skirmish & Monterey's Capture ===
Under the command of Brigadier General David S. Stanley, Colonel W. L. Elliott led sixteen companies of cavalry, including the 2nd Iowa Cavalry and part of the 2nd Michigan Cavalry, against Confederate forces at Monterey at 8:00 in the morning. Elliott's advance encountered pickets from Colonel Nathan Bedford Forrest's 3rd Tennessee Cavalry, which quickly withdrew and left part of Brigadier General Patton Anderson's infantry exposed in the camp. Forrest, who had been patrolling the Monterey-Hamburg Road, was unable to prevent the Federal advance, and Union cavalry captured several prisoners during the pursuit. Confederate losses were reported as five killed and eighteen captured, while Federal casualties amounted to one wounded.

Members of the 5th Company of Washington Artillery (1862)

Shortly thereafter, about 10,000 Federal infantry and cavalry entered the camps at Monterey, which held around 3,500 Confederate infantry and cavalry. For about an hour, Confederates underwent heavy artillery fire from the Union until around 9:00 in the morning. Under the command of General John Pope, the Union then drove the Confederates out, looting and burning their camp in the process. The Union reported about 15 imprisoned. From hereon, Colonel Elliott ordered the 2nd Iowa, led by Major Hiram W. Love, to continue to pursue the retreating Confederates. The Union occupied Monterey at around 9:00 in the morning on April 29, 1862.

The Confederates, however, conducted a defensive ambush on their pursuers after retreating 1 mile south towards the home of Reuben Atkins by about 9:30 in the morning. Infantry under Lieut. Colonel John H. Kelly formed a line and artillery under 1st Lieutenant William C.D. Vaught and Lieutenant Charalon began firing towards a bridge crossing Lick Creek, cutting the roughly 500 Union cavalry off from their pursuit. The artillery fire killed two Union men, injured four more and killed several horses. After holding the position for about 30 minutes and forcing the Union's retreat, General Anderson fell back to "the hill commanding Mr. Atkins' house." Elliott later reported 11 to 25 captured prisoners and at least 1 Confederate wounded in the skirmish. This became known as the Atkins' Home Skirmish.

=== Role in the Siege & Monterey Field Hospital ===
Grant at His Headquarters in Monterey

Monterey became the site of Union operations and brief skirmishing until the end of May. On April 30, Forrest's brigade was ambushed south of Monterey, leading to an unofficial report of 5 Confederate lives, 19 imprisoned and a Confederate retreat. Sherman's division ended up occupying the Pea Ridge Overlook by "mid-day" on May 1. Following several operations around Monterey, the Union moved their headquarters from Pittsburg Landing to Monterey on May 8, 1862. General Halleck and General Grant resided here during a substantial portion of the Siege of Corinth.

Union Earthworks Near Corinth, MS

For the next few weeks, General Halleck ordered a slow advance made towards Monterey in force. This included several extensive entrenchments every couple of miles. Lines would be made and forest was to be cut at least 300 yards ahead before advancements. By May 6, General Pope led a large force towards Farmington from Monterey that became one of the largest skirmishes during the siege.

On May 14, Brigadier Surgeon N. R. Derby re-established the field hospital at Monterey. Derby recounted:

"On May 14th, 1862, I was directed to report to Monterey, to establish a general field hospital for the army before Corinth...400 tents, 340 of the wall pattern, and 60 of the regulation hospital size, were forwarded from the Landing, and pitched as rapidly as possible...in less than 20 days from the time the first tent was pitched, I had received 1,416 patients, and by the middle of June, 1,792."

Union Crossing Abandoned Earthworks in Corinth (May 30, 1862)

On May 15, General Beauregard sent Colonel Jacob Thompson from Corinth to Monterey to conduct a parole agreement that was made with General Halleck. At least 41 Union men were paroled in the agreement following the meeting of Thompson and Colonel Connelly. Skirmishing became less frequent by May 17, as the Union was in skirmishing range of Corinth. The last valuable Confederate camp near Monterey was vacated on May 21, as reported by General Logan. General Lew Wallace remained in the rear of the Union advance guard near Monterey until at least May 24. The Union completed their siege on May 30 and Corinth was occupied by the Federal armies. Monterey Field Hospital was operated until at least June 30, 1862 marking the last operation in the Monterey area.

== Aftermath ==
Following a typhoid fever outbreak in the Monterey Field Hospital, all troops were moved to Hamburg Field Hospital by July, 1862. Monterey would only see one last skirmish in January of 1863, marking the end of Federal interests in the area. The action seen during the Battle of Shiloh and Siege of Corinth forced many locals to flee, leaving only a handful of families to rebuild. The village eventually repopulated and began to grow in the 1880s with enough support to gain a post office again and "Michie, Tennessee" was founded in 1882. The community continued to loosely go by its antebellum title "Pea Ridge" interchangeably, though the "Monterey" name was mostly forgotten among the general public until the late 20th century.

== Preservation Efforts ==
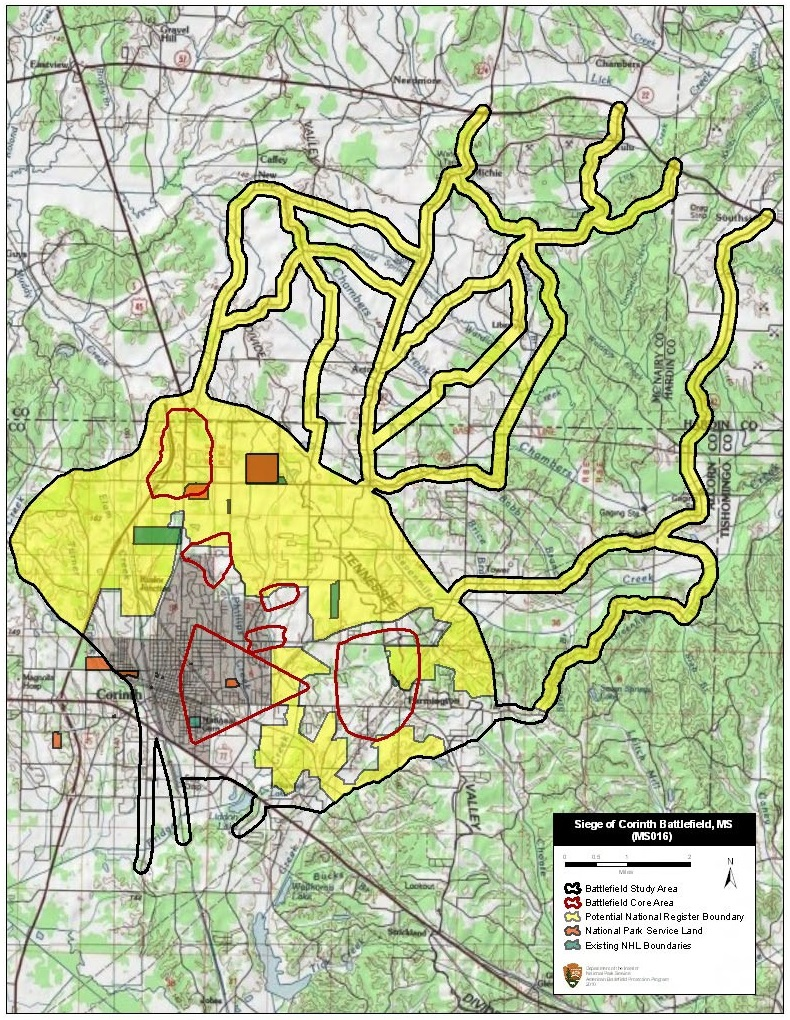
Map of Corinth to Michie / Shiloh Routes Study (ABT)

The American Battlefield Trust has coordinated efforts to save areas of Corinth, Michie and Shiloh. Most recently, the American Battlefield Trust transferred the property of the Battle of Fallen Timbers to the Shiloh National Military Park. Plans for the property are currently being finalized.

As for other significant locations on private property, the Old Monterey Trail Committee, a local historical non-profit, has taken the initiative to re-discover and preserve the land that the Sanders' Family Cemetery and the Pea Ridge Overlook reside on. Currently, the Old Monterey Trail Committee has compiled a driving tour showcasing 15 antebellum sites for tourists of the area. Local historians have compiled & preserved historical narratives for the public. Additionally, the Committee has organized an annual heritage festival for the community's Civil War and local history.

== See also ==
- Siege and Battle of Corinth Sites
- Troop engagements of the American Civil War, 1862
