= Caffey, Tennessee =

Caffey (New Hope)
- Unincorporated Community
- Nickname: New Hope
- Interactive map of Caffey
- Coordinates: 35°03′29″N 88°29′41″W
- Country: United States
- State: Tennessee
- County: McNairy
- Postal code: 38357
- Area code: 731

Caffey is a rural unincorporated community 3.5 miles (5.6 km) west of Michie, Tennessee in McNairy County, Tennessee, United States. Caffey is commonly referred to as the community of New Hope after the New Hope road and church.

== History ==
Caffey is named after Robert Weaver "R.W." Caffey Sr., a local Justice of Peace, administrator and land owner in the 5th Civil District of McNairy County. The town closely identifies with Michie, Tennessee and was formerly known as Locust Grove.

=== Early Settlement and Civil War ===
The early years of settlement in Caffey likely revolved around agriculture and early surveying. As early as 1844, Robert W. Caffey Sr. and W.C. Meeks were among the earliest settled in the area with their families. At the time, the region was known as Locust Grove, but later fell into obscurity after the Civil War. The area had a local carpenter and was the site of William T. Sherman's forces during the Siege of Corinth in May of 1862. At this time, the name "Caffey" existed as a central point in Locust Grove, known as "Caffey Square", and fell along the Old State-Line Road.

=== The Caffey Lawsuit ===
R.W. Caffey Sr. married Lina Farris Chambers prior to 1861. Lina and Caffey shared John Chambers' vast acreage that was deeded to his widowed partner. The estate dispute led to a lawsuit in 1867 between the Farris-Chambers families over 2,395 acres belonging to their heirs across the 5th and 9th Civil Districts. However, after over a decade of trials and hearings, R.W. Caffey won a majority of the settlement in 1880.

=== Verified Community ===
Caffey was first recognized by McNairy County as a precinct in 1902 under the 5th Civil District. Only a year earlier, R.W. Caffey deeded land to the New Hope Church for the construction of the New Hope United Methodist Church building. The first school service was established in 1908 under the New Hope Church.

Following R.W. Caffey's death in 1913, his son, R.W. Caffey Jr., continued to lead the community. By 1920, Caffey Jr. had made strong contributions to funding a roadway from Caffey to the Corinth-Shiloh Turnpike that later became Highway 22.

== Geography ==
Caffey is elevated 502 feet (153 m) above sea level. Muddy Creek is the primary water source in the area, though multiple small unnamed streams run through the area as well.
