= Liberty, McNairy County, Tennessee =

Liberty
- Unincorporated Community
- Liberty Springs
- Interactive map of Liberty
- Coordinates: 35°01′11″N 88°25′14″W
- Country: United States
- State: Tennessee
- County: McNairy
- Postal code: 38357
- Area code: 731

Liberty is a rural unincorporated community 5.5 miles (8.9 km) southeast of Michie, Tennessee in McNairy County, Tennessee.

== Geography ==
Liberty is situated within small hills and valleys in the southeast of McNairy County. Its elevation is 472 feet (144 m) above sea level. Occasionally, Liberty is sometimes nicknamed "Liberty Springs" for its numerous creeks and brooks including:

- Wardlow Creek
- Waldrop Creek
- Liberty Branch
- Sharp Branch
- Donald Springs Branch

== History ==
Liberty is a farm-heavy community that likely settled on the basis of agriculture in its early years.

The area is indirectly referenced during the Civil War twice. The "Babb" house is mentioned as a skirmish location in late April (1862) between General Forrest's cavalry and General Pope's left wing that ended in a Confederate retreat. Additionally, Liberty is indirectly displayed on an 1862 map, showing numerous fields, a cotton press, butcher and church. This church is likely refers to the Liberty Church that the community was built around.

By June 3, 1889, Liberty Church was established as one of the first schools in the 9th Civil District of McNairy County, alongside Mount Olive Church. This church school house existed until at least 1923, when it was populated by 43 students.

Following the Reconstruction era, Liberty continues to utilize Corinth, Mississippi as its primary service hub and Michie for local education.
