= Tulu, Tennessee =

Tulu
- Neighborhood
- Interactive map of Tulu
- Coordinates: 35°03′46″N 88°23′38″W
- Country: United States
- State: Tennessee
- County: McNairy
- Postal code: 38357
- Area code: 731

Tulu, Tennessee is a neighborhood in Michie in McNairy County, Tennessee.

== History ==
Sometime before the Civil War, the first church, Mount Olivette Church, was established in the present-day area.

During the Civil War, Tulu is never mentioned directly. However, two skirmishes occurred in the area on April 3 and April 29, 1862. One of which was titled the "skirmish at Atkins' Mill". A few decades after the Civil War, Tulu established its first post office (1893–1901)

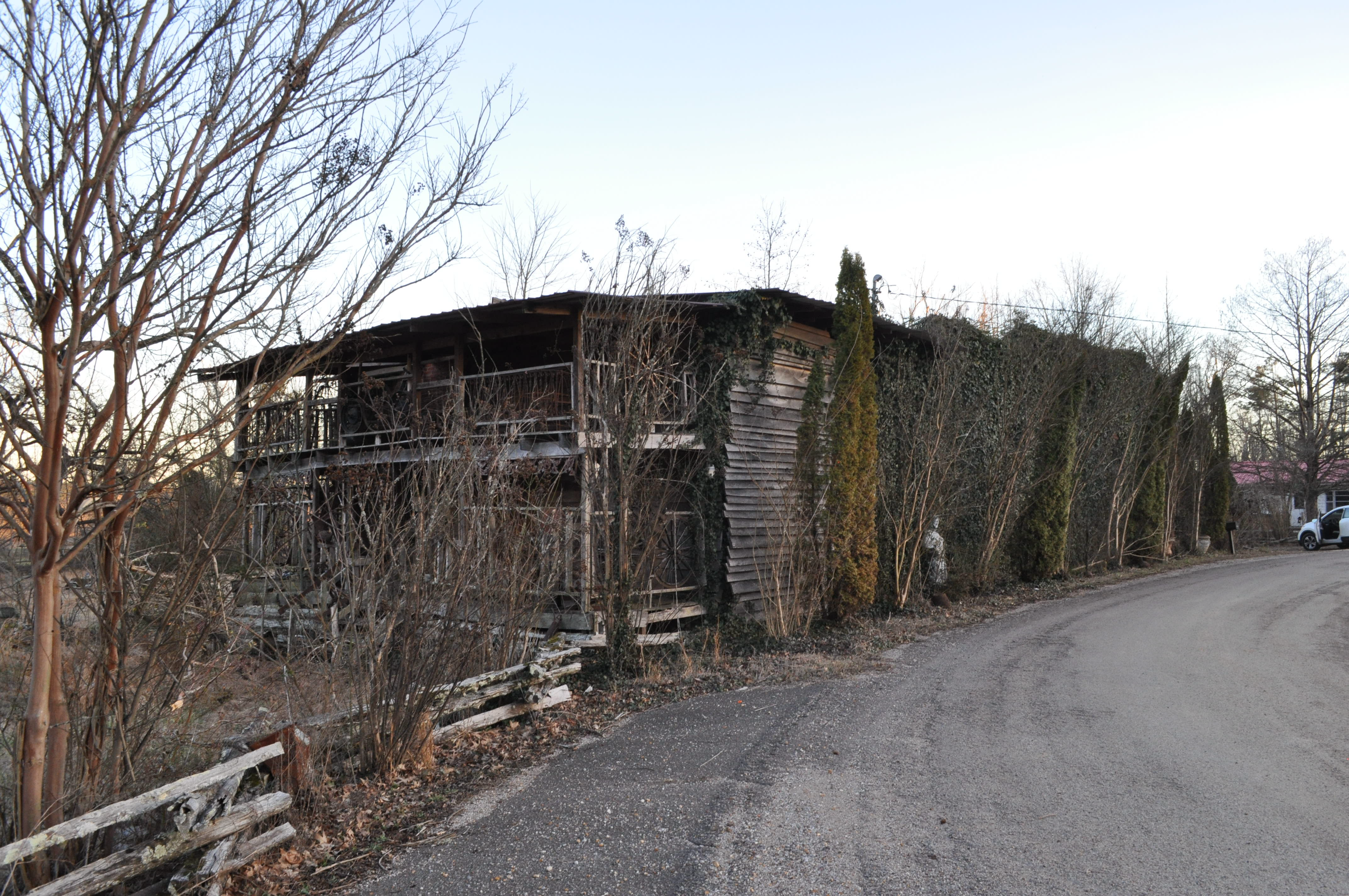
Tulu General Store (2026)

By as early as 1880, the community withheld one of the first schools in the 9th Civil District of McNairy County. This school was known as the Mount Olivette Church School House which was later semantically shifted into being known as the "Tulu" School. In the year 1900, there was one "Tulu General Store" built to about ~2000 sq. feet. The building served as a shop before being transformed into a community center & jail and, finally, a home. By 1910, the Tulu Baptist Church was established. This church would end up absorbing Mount Olivette sometime between 1910 and the 1940s.

Tulu School was formally appointed to be merged alongside Pebble Hill and Michie under the newly erected Michie Consolidated School in 1921. Gradually, this would stagnate the community's individuality and ultimately cause Tulu to be absorbed into Michie by 1961 when the town received its incorporated barriers.
