= Michie, Tennessee =

- Town
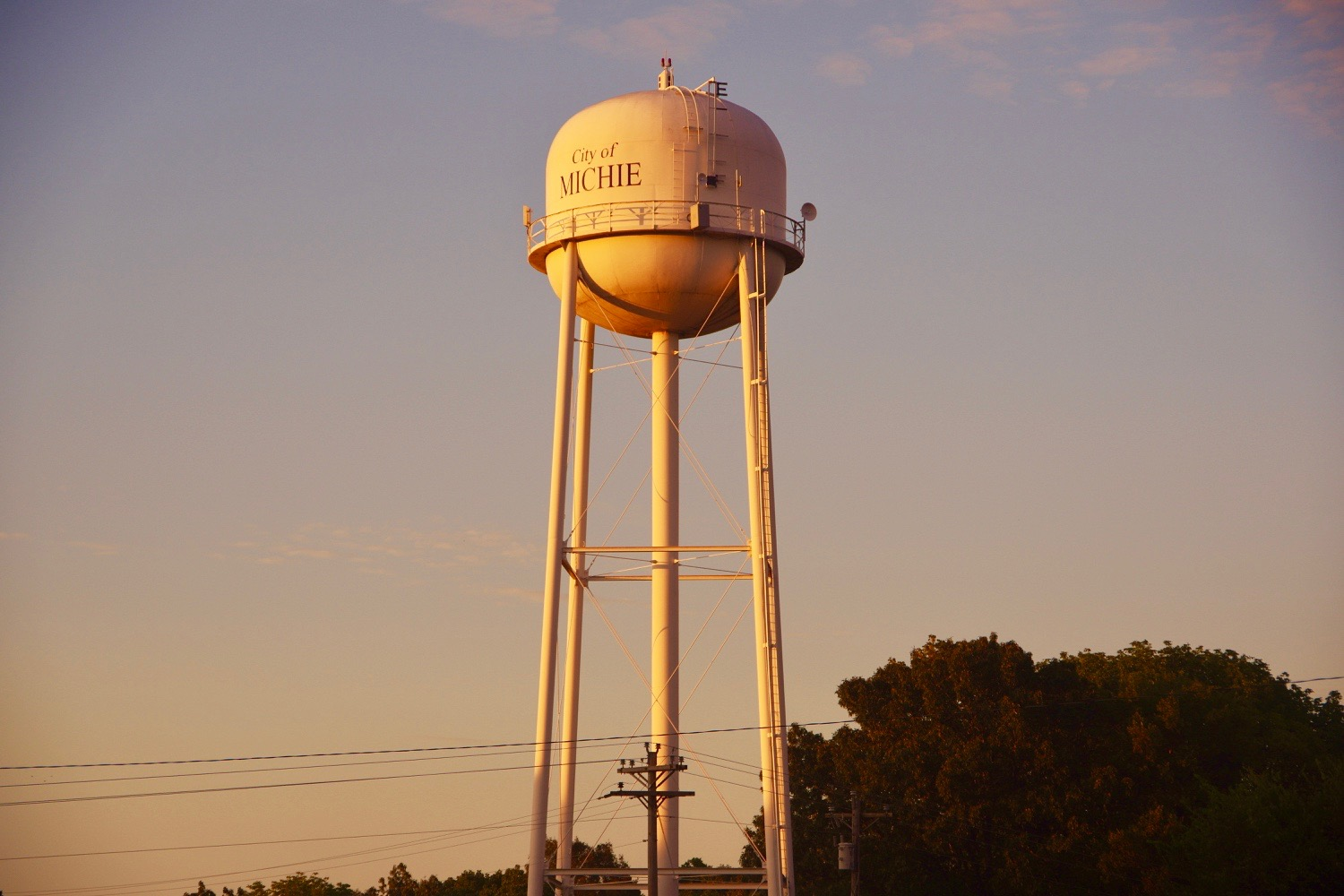
- Water tower in Michie
- Nickname(s): Monterey, Pea Ridge
- Location of Michie in McNairy County, Tennessee.
- Coordinates: 35°3′16″N 88°25′53″W
- Country: United States
- State: Tennessee
- County: McNairy

Area
  - Total: 5.62 sq mi (14.56 km^{2})
  - Land: 5.62 sq mi (14.56 km^{2})
  - Water: 0 sq mi (0.00 km^{2})
- Elevation: 607 ft (185 m)

Population (2020)
  - Total: 679
  - Density: 120.8/sq mi (46.63/km^{2})
- Time zone: UTC-6 (Central (CST))
  - Summer (DST): UTC-5 (CDT)
- ZIP code: 38357
- Area code: 731
- FIPS code: 47-48180
- GNIS feature ID: 1293644

Michie is a town in McNairy County, Tennessee. The population was 591 at the 2010 census and 679 at the 2020 census.

== History ==
=== Monterey and Civil War ===
Michie is rooted in a 19th century community known as "Monterey." When the community applied for a post office in 1881, the name Monterey had already been taken by another town in Tennessee, so the community settled on the name "Michie" after a prominent local family.

The community of Michie, known as "Pea Ridge" by locals at the time, was formed as early as the 1820s. Settlers resided along Lick Creek and built water mills until roadways were established by the County in the late 1840s and early 1850s. Benjamin F. Sanders would declare the community "Monterey" after a prominent battle of which many Tennesseans volunteered in during the Mexican-American War. Between the 1840s and 1860s, Monterey was established as the Seat of District 9 in McNairy County. In the early 1860s, Tennessee debated seceding from the Union. When the vote for secession came to District 9 of McNairy County on June 8, 1861, the vote concluded with 145 votes for and 0 against.

While the area most notably served as a headquarters and field hospital, Monterey hosted numerous other operations during the War. The "Mickey House," a misinterpretation of the Michie family's name, was referenced as a meeting point and headquarters for the numerous corps of the Confederate Army of Mississippi in early April, 1862. On April 5, Confederate forces left the staging ground after camping in Monterey for several days, beginning the Battle of Shiloh. Following the first two days of the battle, Monterey became the site of the Battle of Fallen Timbers on April 8. The "Monterey Field Hospital" was established after Fallen Timbers when a warehouse was repurposed to hold injured Confederate soldiers. Until late April, Confederate troops were tasked with holding Monterey and its numerous campsites. The area was frequently contested with skirmishing until it fell into Union hands following the advance of the Union on April 29, 1862. Monterey was the headquarters for General Grant and General Halleck for a majority of the Siege of Corinth, which the Union operated out of, forming numerous lines of earthworks from Michie to Corinth. Monterey was used by the Union until forces were in skirmishing range on May 24. By July, the Monterey hospital was closed and Monterey fell out of military interest.

General Ulysses S. Grant Overlooking His Headquarters in Monterey, TN. (May 7, 1862)

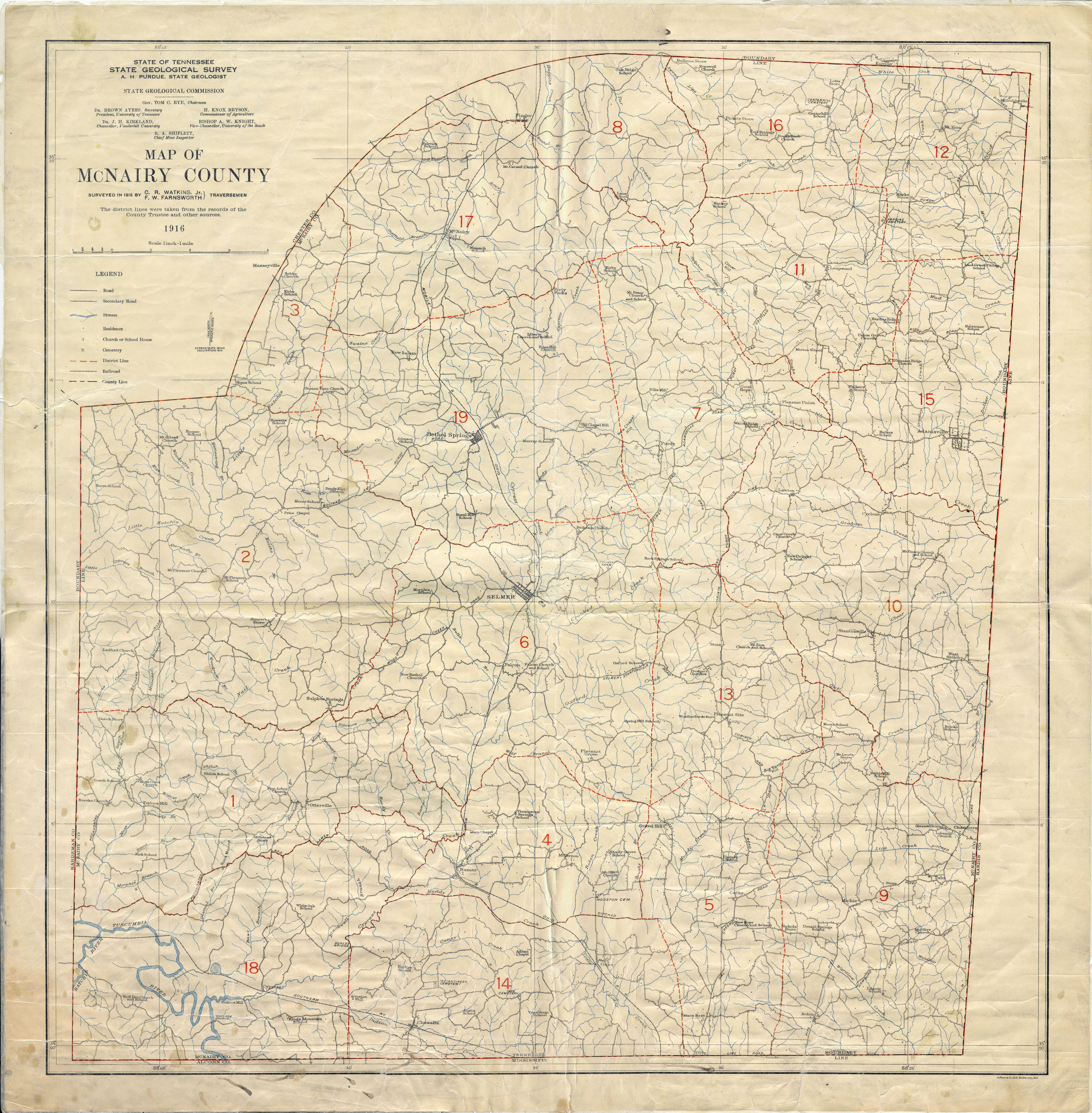
Map of McNairy County in 1916. Michie (District 9)

Following the war, Monterey was laid in ruins, with many families fleeing from the conflict. The only complete remaining structure was the remains of the Monterey hospital, described by Benson J. Lossing. Ultimately, "Monterey" became obsolete in local usage, though "Pea Ridge" found continued use by locals. The community applied re-applied for a post office in 1881 with the "Monterey" name, but found it was already in use. The community settled fro "Michie" after a local family with the secondary option of "Pea Ridge." The application returned with approval for the "Michie" name in January of 1882 and the name stuck ever since.

=== Municipal Era ===
The town incorporated in 1961.

Topological map showing Michie and surrounding communities.

==== Mayors ====
In 1961, Michie successfully incorporated and held an election to inaugurate their first mayor. "Doc" Eldridge Samuel Howard served as the first mayor of Michie from 1961 until 1971. The town election yielded Joe Greer as the succeeding mayor of Michie for one term until 1973. Between 1973 to 1977, Sammy "Sam" Bowers ran the position. In August 1977, Howard was re-elected mayor to succeed Bowers. Howard would pass away shortly after, but vice-mayor James "Tommy" Thomas Wigginton was forwarded to the mayor position after Howard's death. Tommy Wigginton served Michie for five terms (19 years) until his death in 1996. Following Wigginton's passing, Barry Moore was selected to fill the vacant position of mayor. After Moore's service, Don Greer served for 11 years. Vice-Mayor David Baker was selected to fill Greer's vacancy when he resigned and served for two years between 2011 and 2013. After Baker, the City of Michie elected Anthony Smith, who served an 11-year timespan until his formal resignation in 2024. From thereafter, Alderman "Wes" Rainey fulfilled the vacant mayor position until his resignation in 2025. Jay Poindexter was selected to fill the vacancy and now serves as the City's Mayor in 2026.

==== Infrastructure ====
A list of deeds by Mayor James "Tommy" Thomas Wigginton of Michie (1996).

From 1979 to 1980, an expansion and update was completed to the Michie Water System, rising from 450 to 850 customers. In 1981, construction for a regulation-approved baseball/softball park began and completed on May 3, 1982. By 1982, the Michie Volunteer Fire Department was organized. From February 1982 to August 1983, the Michie Civic Center constructed and opened to the public. Around the early to mid-1980s, the Michie City Park was constructed, paid for by Michie's General Funds with assistance from Federal Revenue Sharing. A factory, U.S. Apparel, was established in 1985 in the old Michie Community Center. From 1980 to 1990, the population of Michie grew from 530 to 677. Large-scale road renovations were made in 1991 for Michie's paving program, though roadwork was common in many years prior. By 1994, the Town of Michie purchased a new pumper and tanker for their fire department, which would also see the completion of their fire station in 1996.

==== Current Municipality ====
As of 2026, Jay Poindexter is the mayor of Michie. The current aldermen are David Lynn Baker, Jed Baker and Robert Dunn. The city's attorney is Terry Wood.

== Geography ==
Michie is located at 35°3′16″N 88°25′53″W (35.054533, -88.431452). The town is concentrated around the intersection of State Route 22 and State Route 224, just north of the Tennessee-Mississippi state line. State Route 57 traverses the northern part of Michie, connecting the town with Pickwick Lake to the east. Shiloh National Military Park, where the Battle of Shiloh took place during the Civil War, lies along TN 22 to the north.

According to the United States Census Bureau, the town has a total area of 5.6 square miles (15 km^{2}), all land.

=== Communities ===
Though some are not formerly incorporated into Michie, many communities identify with Michie due to their relations with commerce, entertainment and education. Some communities include:

- Acton
- Tulu
- Liberty
- Chambers
- Pebble Hill
- Caffey

== Newspaper ==
Michie's newspaper is the McNairy County News, which has the largest following of any weekly newspaper on Facebook in the state of Tennessee. They are located at 252 Mulberry Ave. in Selmer.

== Demographics ==
Historical population
Census	Pop.	Note	%±
1970	377		—
1980	530		40.6%
1990	677		27.7%
2000	647		−4.4%
2010	591		−8.7%
2020	679		14.9%

As of the census of 2000, there were 647 people, 275 households, and 201 families residing in the town. The population density was 116.6 inhabitants per square mile (45.0/km^{2}). There were 310 housing units at an average density of 55.9 per square mile (21.6/km^{2}). The racial makeup of the town was 97.84% White, 1.08% African American, 0.46% from other races, and 0.62% from two or more races. Hispanic or Latino of any race were 1.70% of the population.

There were 275 households, out of which 25.1% had children under the age of 18 living with them, 60.4% were married couples living together, 9.5% had a female householder with no husband present, and 26.9% were non-families. 25.1% of all households were made up of individuals, and 13.5% had someone living alone who was 65 years of age or older. The average household size was 2.35 and the average family size was 2.77.

In the town, the population was spread out, with 21.6% under the age of 18, 5.7% from 18 to 24, 26.6% from 25 to 44, 27.5% from 45 to 64, and 18.5% who were 65 years of age or older. The median age was 42 years. For every 100 females, there were 88.6 males. For every 100 females age 18 and over, there were 88.5 males.

The median income for a household in the town was $28,929, and the median income for a family was $34,688. Males had a median income of $30,119 versus $20,625 for females. The per capita income for the town was $13,122. About 9.3% of families and 11.0% of the population were below the poverty line, including 6.8% of those under age 18 and 11.8% of those age 65 or over.

== School ==
Michie Elementary is the home of the Blue Devils, located on 6418 Hwy 57E, Michie, TN. MES is 1 of 5 schools located in the McNairy County School District. As of 2025, the enrollment population rests at 366. Their sports consist of Jr. High Football, Softball, both male and female basketball teams, and a track team. The school was originally a high school before its transformation in the 1960s.
