= Siege of Corinth =

1862 battle of the American Civil War

- Part of the American Civil War
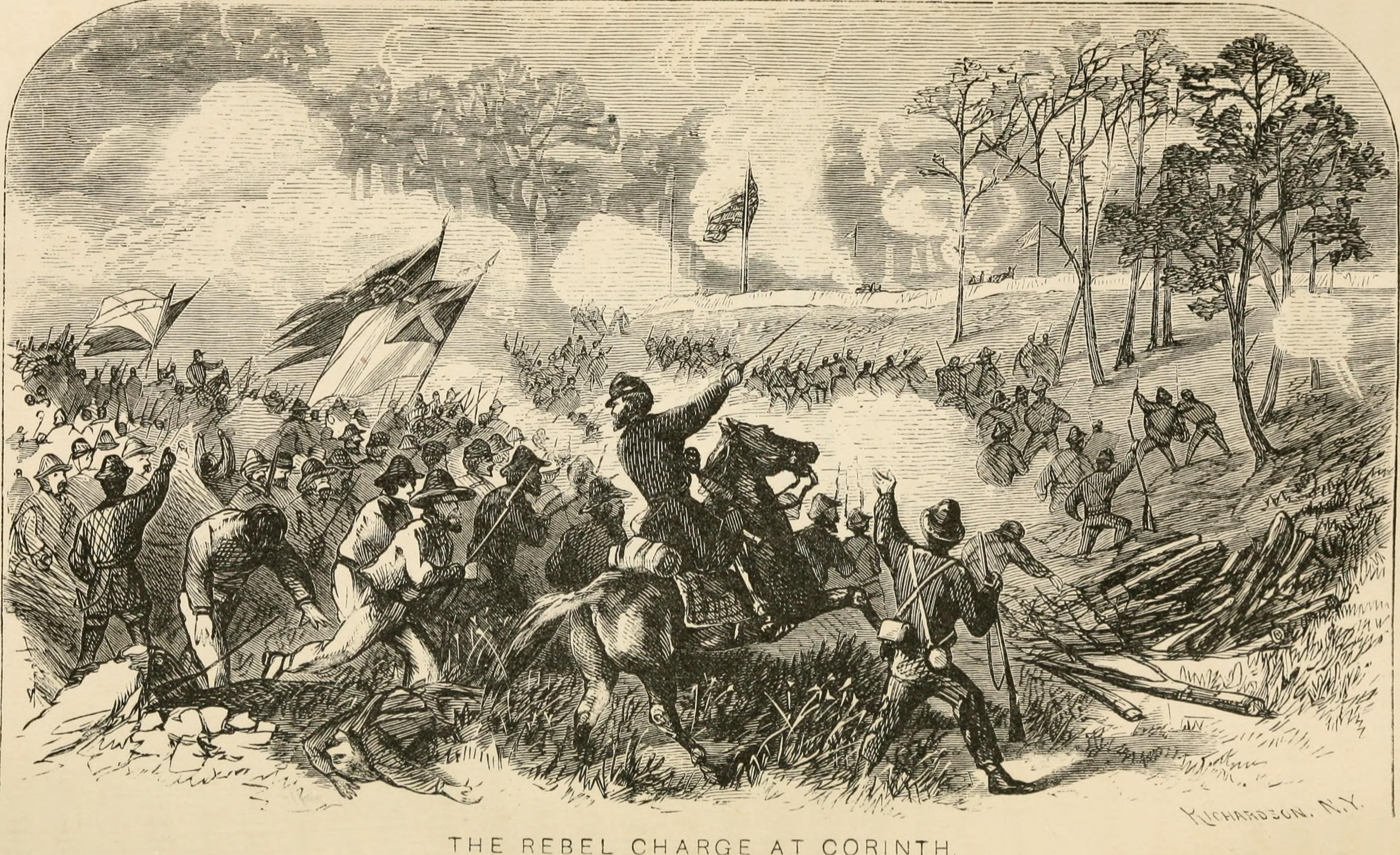
- The Rebel Charge at Corinth
Date	April 29, 1862 – May 30, 1862 (1 month and 1 day)
Location	Corinth, Mississippi 34°56′15.25″N 88°31′47.64″W
Result	Union victory

Belligerents
United States (Union)	Confederate States

Commanders and leaders
Henry W. Halleck	P. G. T. Beauregard

Units involved
Department of the Mississippi	Department Number Two

Strength
120,000	65,000

Casualties and losses
1,000+	1,000+
- Location within Mississippi

The siege of Corinth, also known as the first battle of Corinth, was an American Civil War engagement lasting from April 29 to May 30, 1862, in Corinth, Mississippi. A collection of Union forces under the overall command of Major General Henry W. Halleck (in his only field command of the war) engaged in a month-long siege of the city, whose Confederate occupants were commanded by General P.G.T. Beauregard. The siege resulted in the capture of the town by Federal forces.

The town was a strategic point at the junction of two vital railroad lines, the Mobile and Ohio Railroad and the Memphis and Charleston Railroad. Former Confederate Secretary of War LeRoy Pope Walker called this intersection "the vertebrae of the Confederacy." Halleck argued: "Richmond and Corinth are now the great strategic points of the war, and our success at these points should be insured at all hazards." Another reason for the town's importance was that, if captured by Union forces, it would threaten the security of Chattanooga, Tennessee, and render Southern control of the track west of that East Tennessee bastion meaningless.

The siege ended when the outnumbered Confederates withdrew on May 29. This effectively cut off the prospect of further Confederate attempts to regain western Tennessee. The Union forces under Ulysses S. Grant took control and made it the base for Grant's operations to seize control of the Mississippi River Valley and especially the Confederate stronghold of Vicksburg, Mississippi. Grant later recalled in his memoirs the importance Corinth held in the cause of a Union victory in the region: "Corinth was a valuable strategic point for the enemy to hold, and consequently a valuable one for us to possess ourselves of." General C. S. Hamilton later recounted that the importance of Corinth was summed up as such: "The Confederate armies had been driven from the Ohio River, almost out of the States of Tennessee and Kentucky a steadying back for a distance of 200 miles Federal occupation reaching the Gulf States where chivalrous foes had been sure Yankee would never set foot." Sherman too later wrote of the importance that Corinth held after the Second Battle of Corinth was concluded: "In Memphis I could see its effects upon the citizens, and they openly admitted that their cause had sustained a death-blow."

With the siege of Corinth completed, Federal troops had the opportunity to strike towards Vicksburg or Chattanooga, but it was after the Second Battle of Corinth that October that Grant struck for Vicksburg. The siege of Corinth was described by Major General Sherman as a change in the tactics in West Tennessee: "The effect of the battle of Corinth was very great. It was, indeed, a decisive blow to the Confederate cause in our quarter, and changed the whole aspect of affairs in West Tennessee. From the timid defensive we were at once enabled to assume the bold offensive."

== Background ==
=== Military situation ===
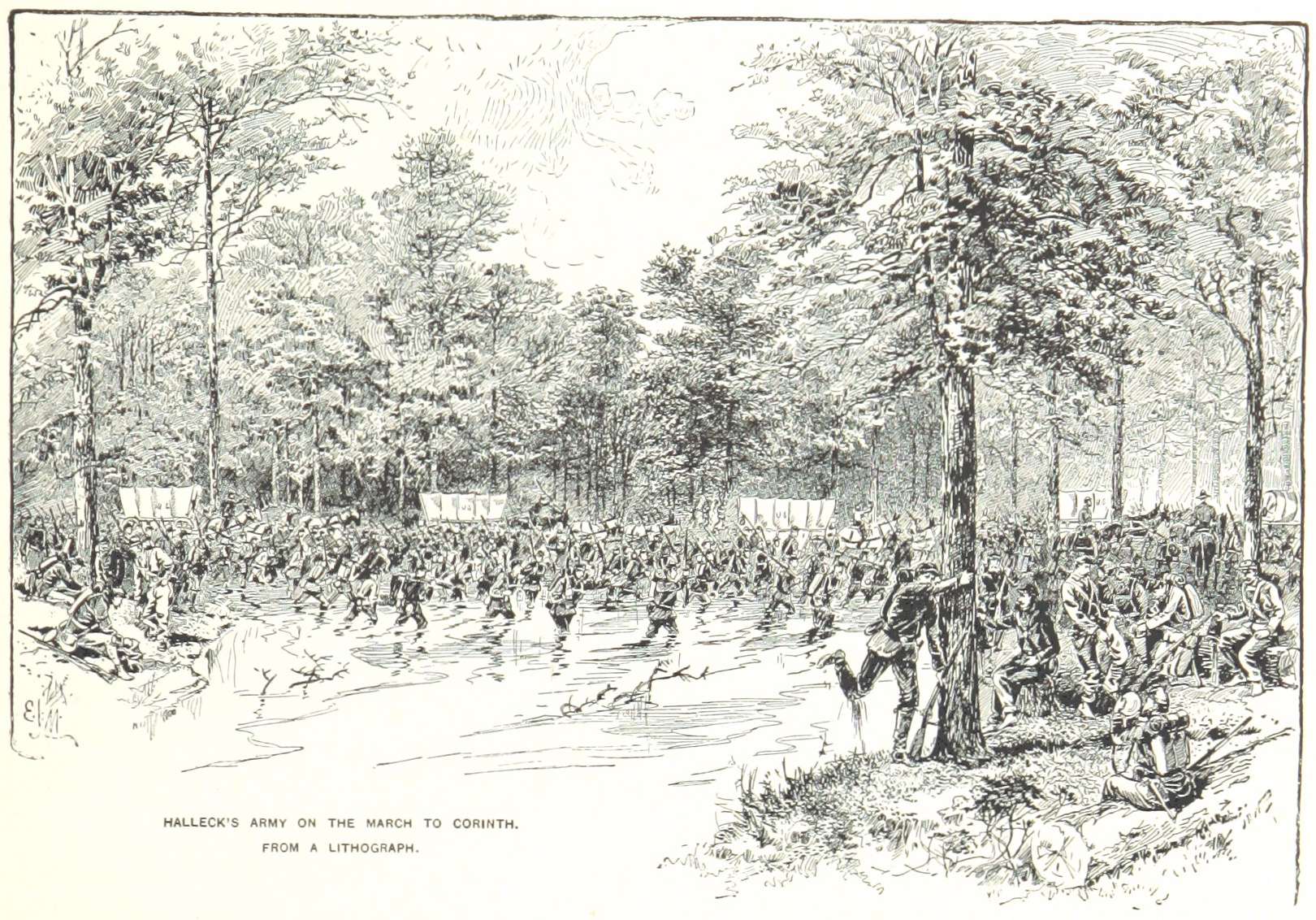
Halleck's army marches towards Corinth

Following the Union Army victory at the Battle of Shiloh on April 6–7, Major General Henry W. Halleck amassed three Union armies —the Army of the Tennessee, the Army of the Ohio, and the Army of the Mississippi— for an advance on the vital rail center of Corinth, Mississippi. Skirmishing became frequent in the nearby ridge-protected Confederate outpost of Monterey (modern-day Michie, TN), which the Union would capture and establish as their headquarters for a majority of the siege by May 8, 1862. Made cautious by the staggering losses at Shiloh, Halleck embarked on a tedious campaign of offensive entrenchment, fortifying after each advance. By May 25, after moving five miles in three weeks, Halleck was in position to lay siege to the town. Confederate morale was low and Beauregard was outnumbered two to one. The water was bad. Typhoid and dysentery had felled thousands of his men. At a council of war, the Confederate officers concluded that they could not hold the railroad crossover. Sickness had claimed the lives of as many men as the Confederacy had lost at Shiloh.

== Opposing forces ==
=== Union ===
Key Union Commanders
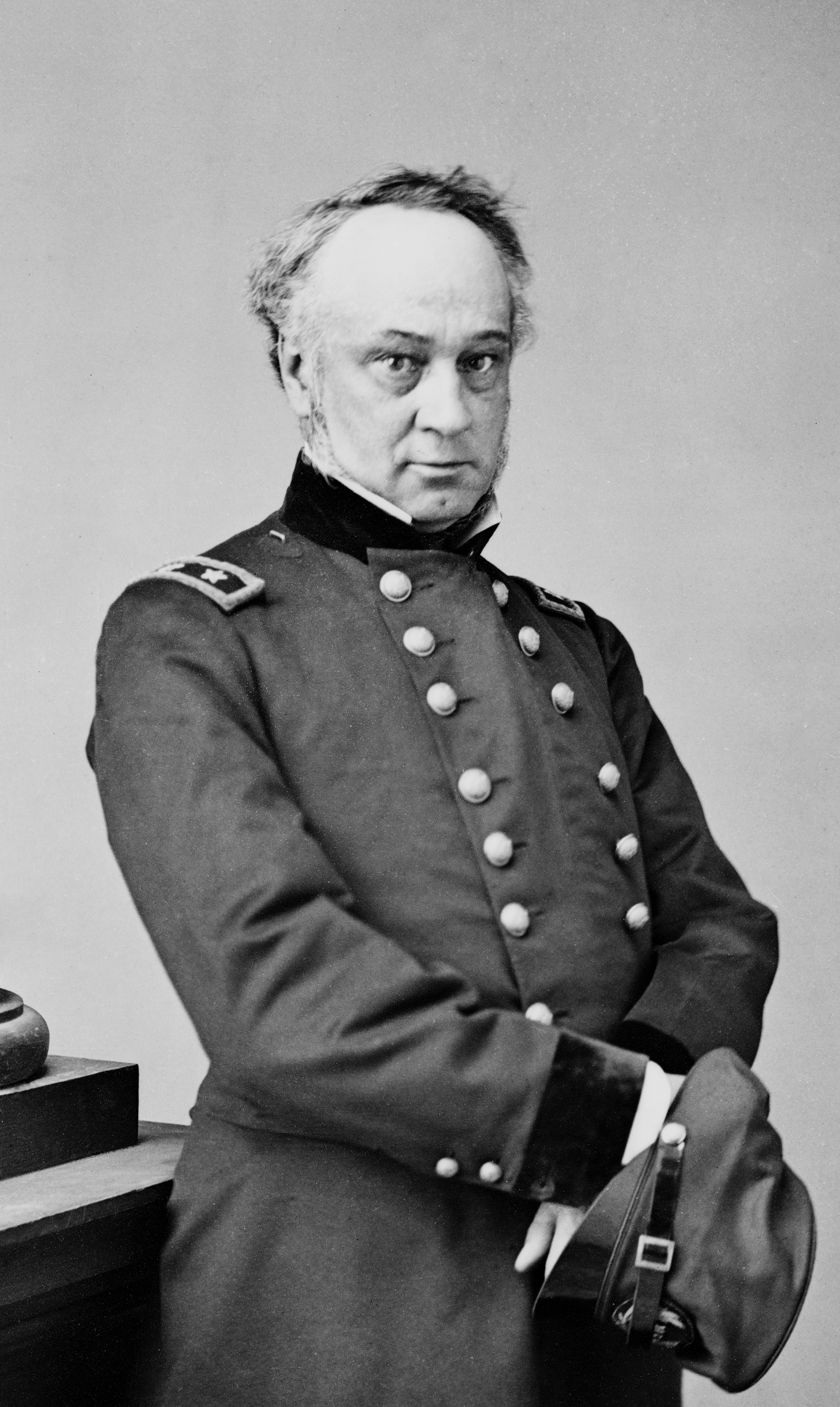
Maj. Gen.
Henry W. Halleck,
Commanding

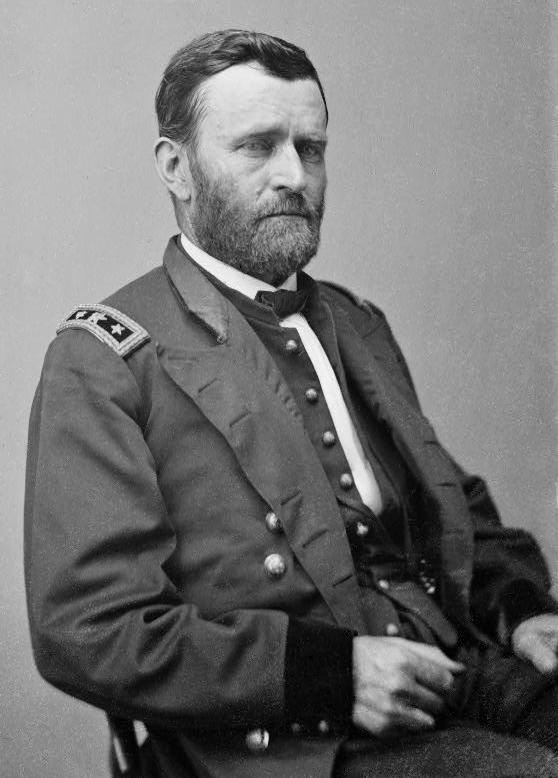
Maj. Gen.
Ulysses S. Grant

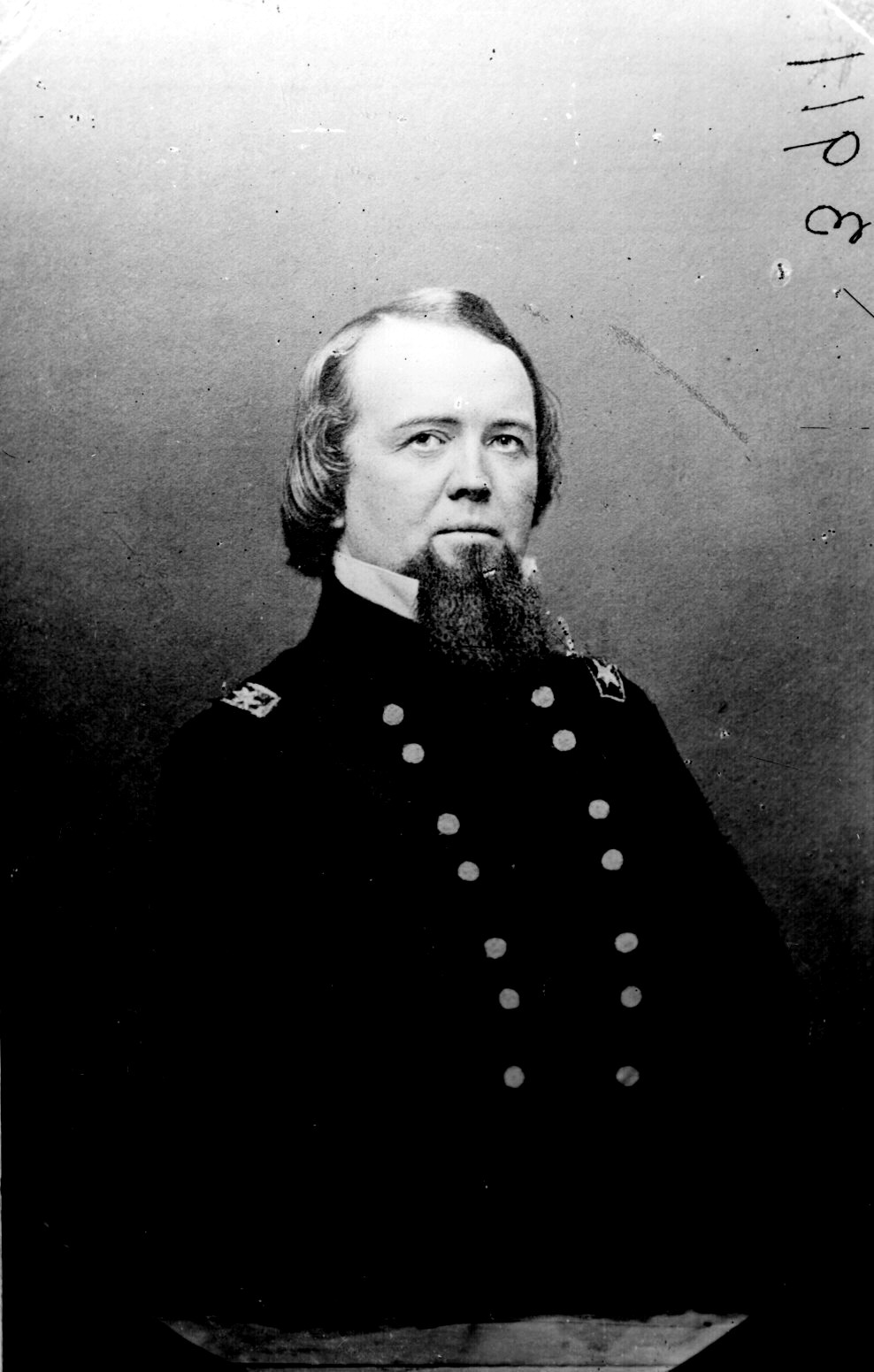
Maj. Gen.
John Pope

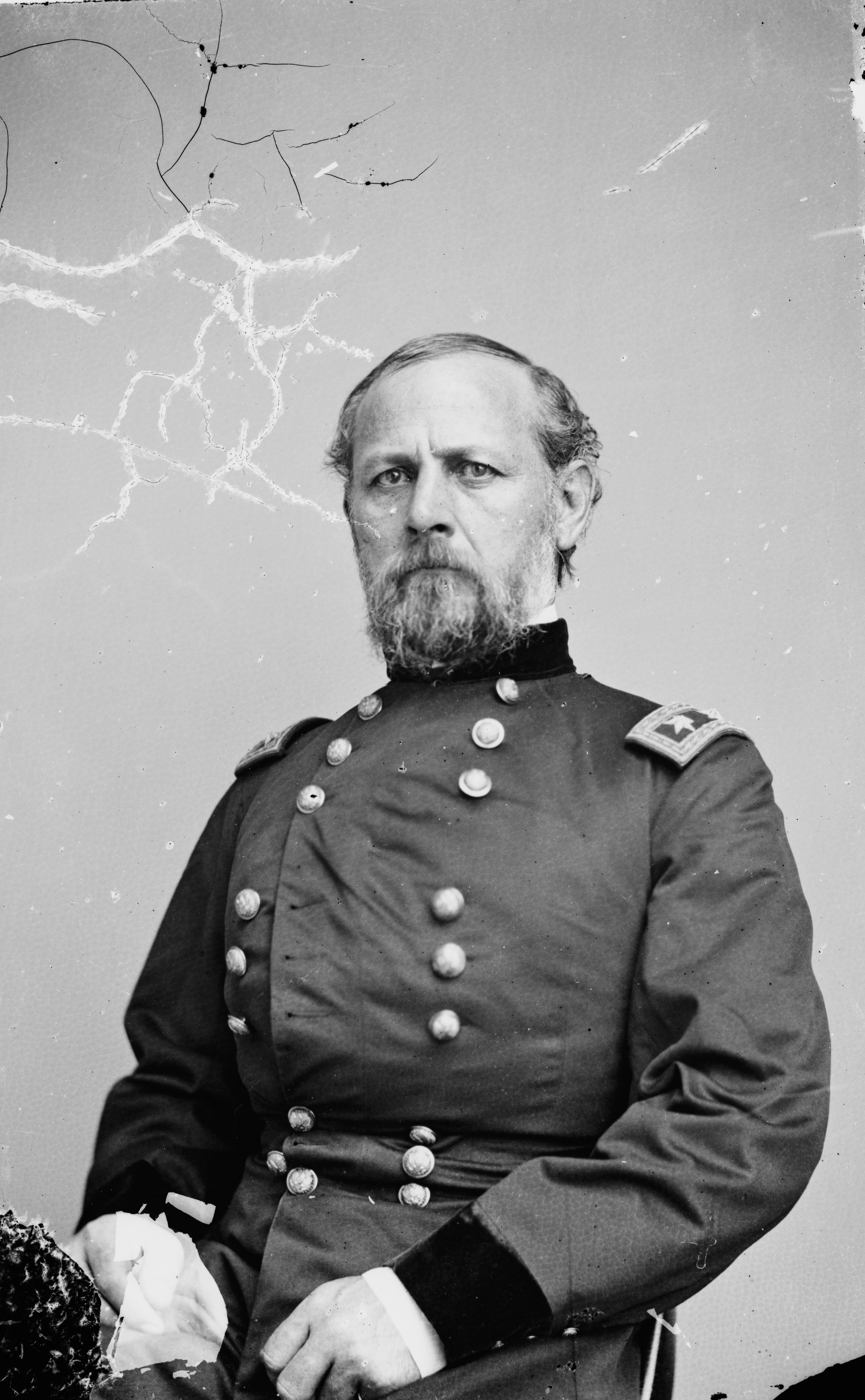
Maj. Gen.
Don Carlos Buell

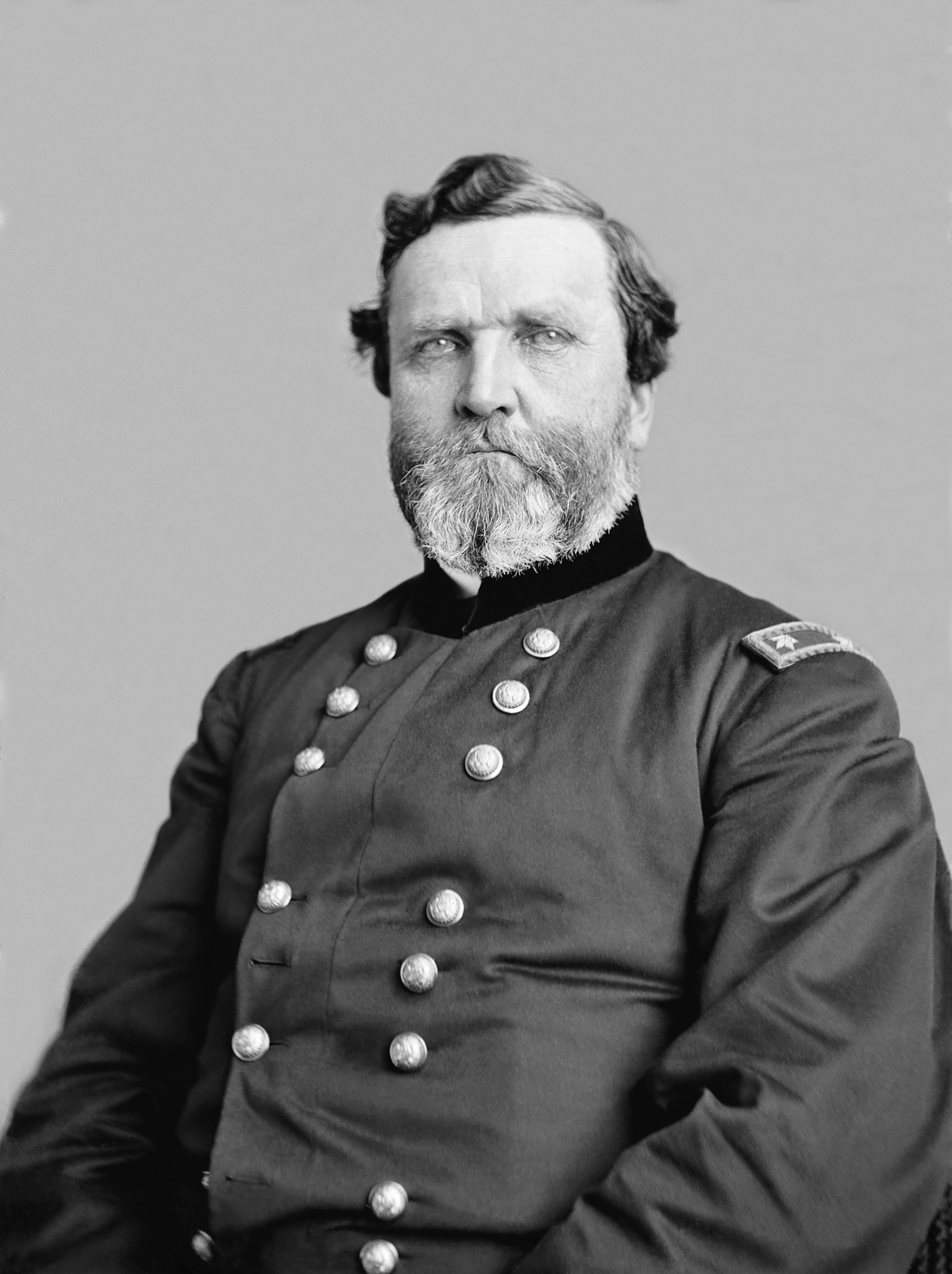
Maj. Gen.
George H. Thomas

The Department of the Mississippi, commanded by Henry W. Halleck, was divided into three wings. Each wing corresponded to one of the three armies under his command. It totaled 120,172 men present for duty.

- The Army of the Mississippi, designated the left wing, commanded by Major General John Pope, totaled 21,510 men.
- The Army of the Ohio, designated the center wing, commanded by Major General Don Carlos Buell, totaled 48,108 men.
- The Army of the Tennessee, designated the right wing, commanded by Major General George H. Thomas, totaled 50,554 men.

=== Confederate ===
Key Confederate Commanders
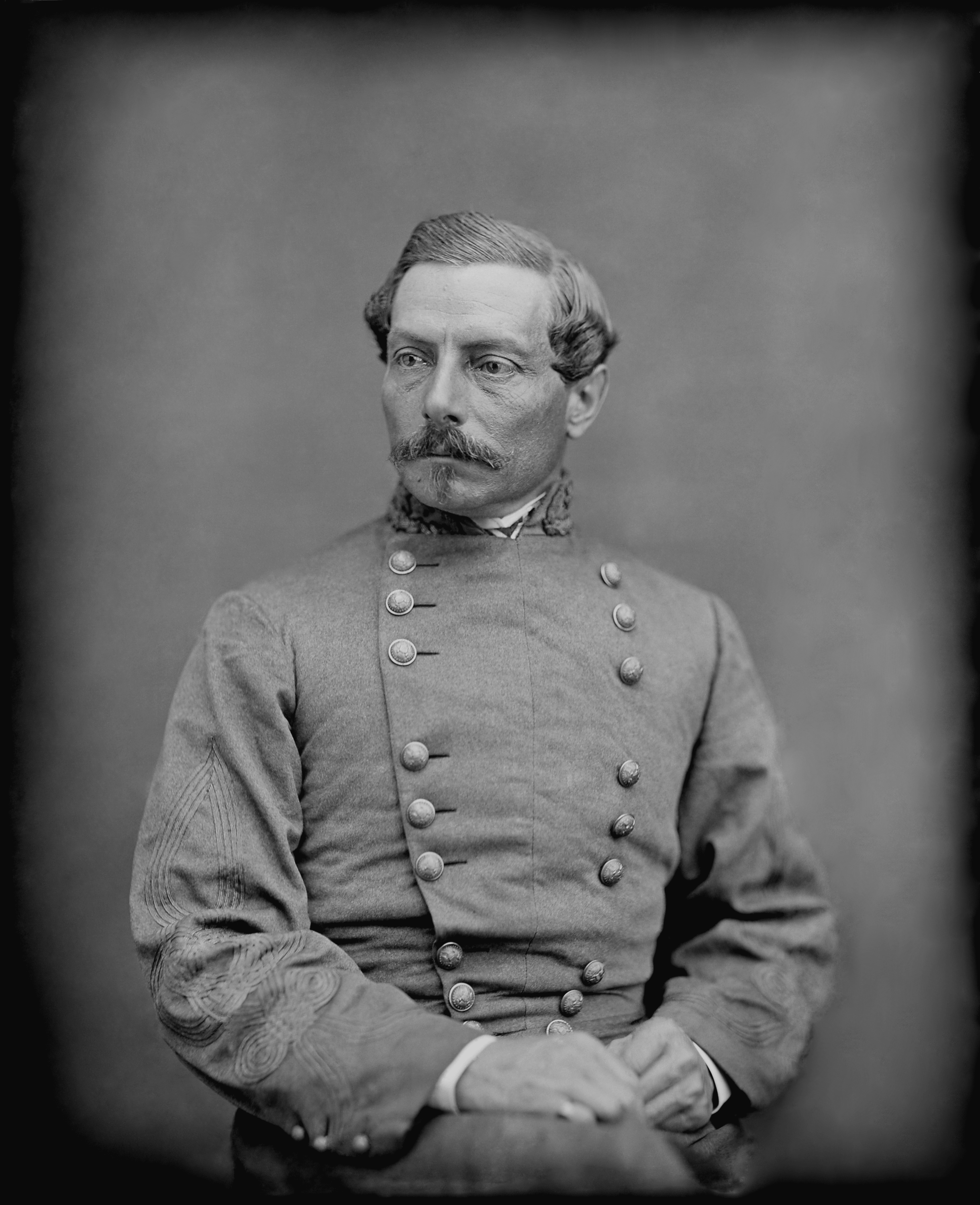
General
P. G. T. Beauregard,
Commanding

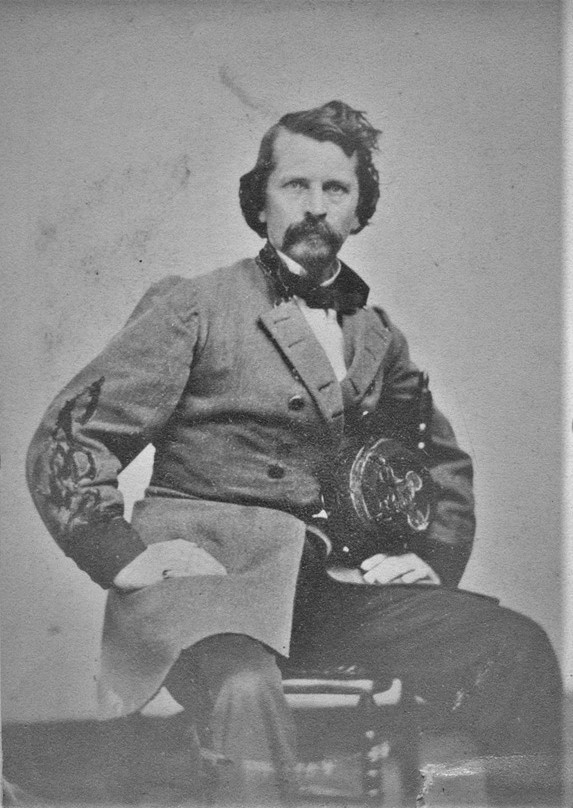
Maj. Gen.
Earl Van Dorn

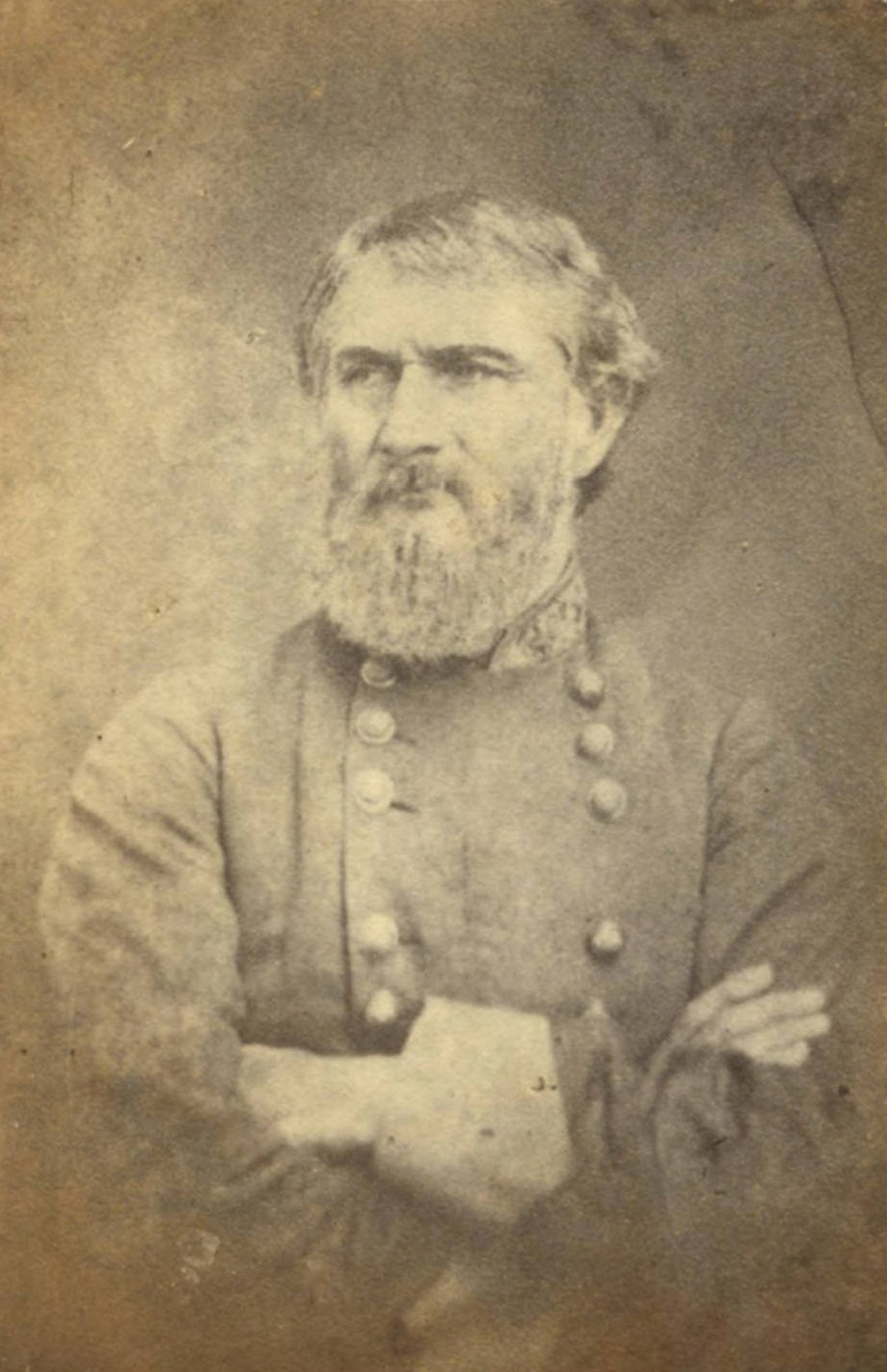
Maj. Gen.
Leonidas Polk

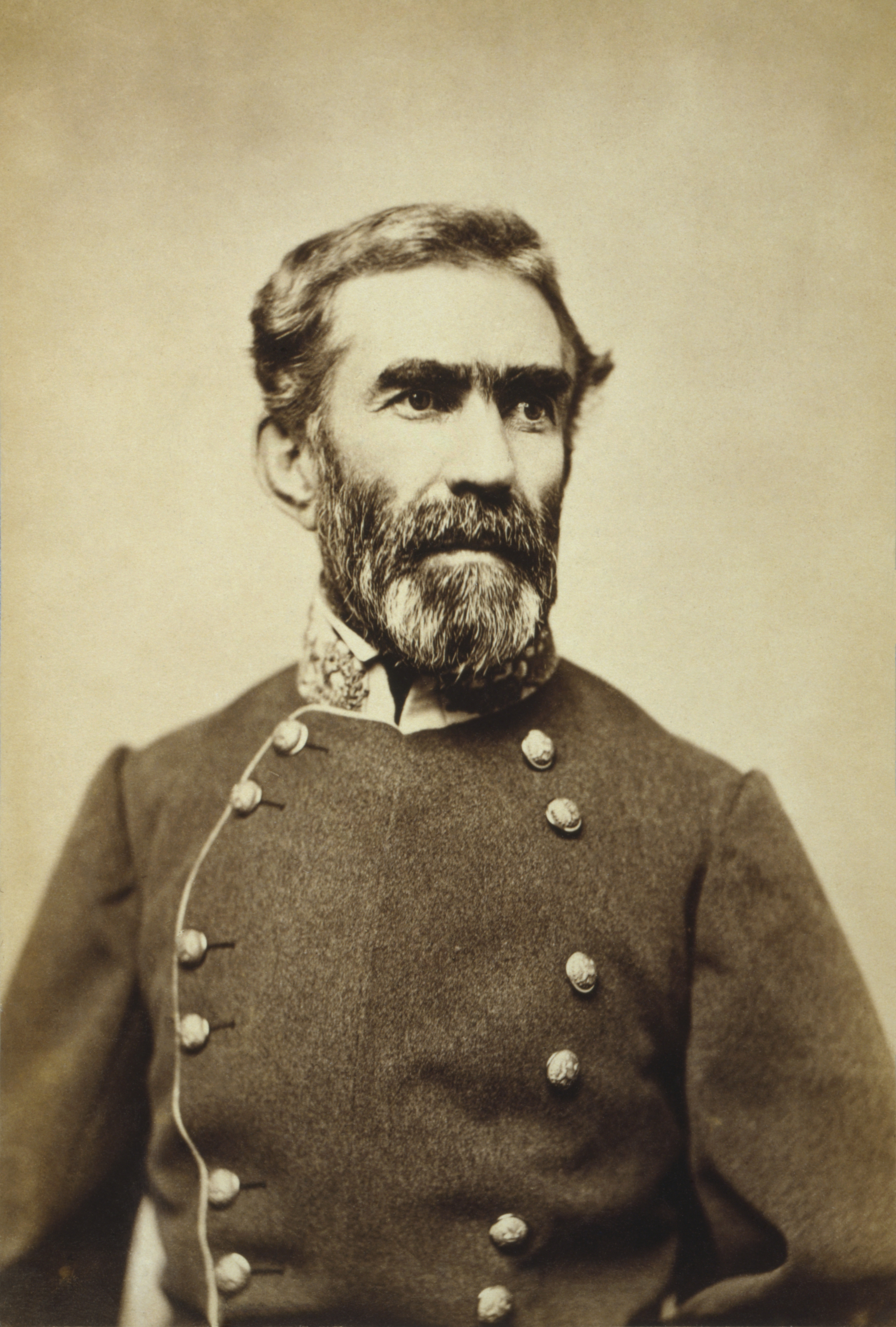
Maj. Gen.
Braxton Bragg

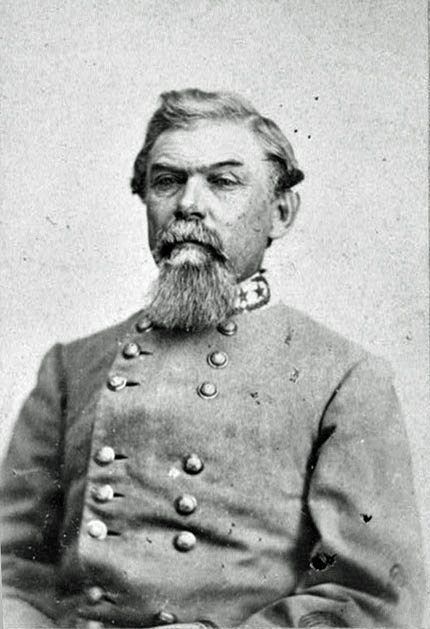
Maj. Gen.
William J. Hardee

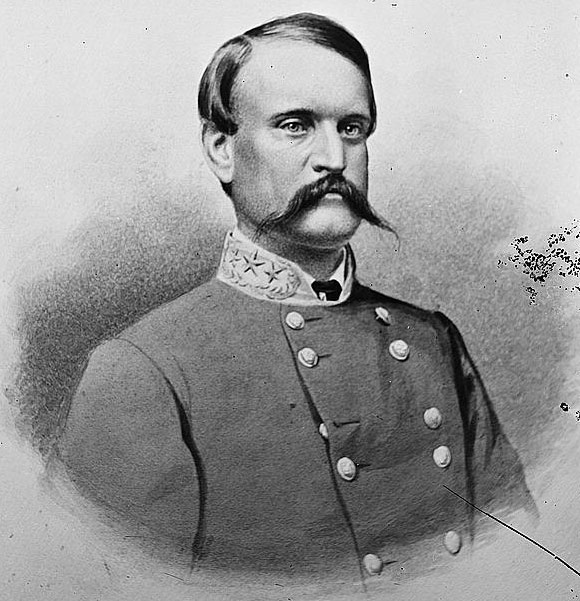
Brig. Gen.
John C. Breckinridge

The Army of Mississippi, commanded by General P. G. T. Beauregard, who also held overall command of all Confederate forces at Corinth, consisted of 45,440 men on April 30. It was divided into four corps:

- I Corps, commanded by Major General Leonidas Polk,
- II Corps, commanded by Major General Braxton Bragg, included the divisions of Major General Benjamin F. Cheatham and Major General Jones M. Withers.
- III Corps, commanded by Major General William J. Hardee, included the brigades of Colonel Robert G. Shaver, Brigadier General Patrick Cleburne, Brigadier General S. A. M. Wood, and Brigadier General John S. Marmaduke.
- The Reserve Corps, commanded by Brigadier General John C. Breckinridge.

The Army of the West, commanded by Major General Earl Van Dorn, consisted of 12,901 men under the divisions of Major General Samuel Jones, Major General Sterling Price, and Major General John P. McCown.

== Battle ==
=== Monterey (Michie) ===
Map of Corinth to Shiloh, showing Monterey between the two sites

On April 28, 1862, the Commander of the Federal Field Army, Major-General Halleck, ordered a complete advance towards Corinth, Mississippi from Pittsburg Landing on the morning of April 29. The Siege of Corinth would begin with the federal division under General Stanley, which moved south down the road towards Corinth to search for the enemy. Under Stanley, Colonel W. L. Elliot, with 16 companies of cavalry including the 2nd Iowa Cavalry Regiment and part of the 2nd Michigan Cavalry Regiment, made contact with Confederate pickets of Forrest's 3rd Tennessee Cavalry Regiment who retreated rapidly leaving infantry of Patton Anderson's brigade in the camp at Monterey unprepared. Forrest had been patrolling the Monterey-Hamburg (Babb) Road when the skirmish broke out. The 2nd Iowa captured 11 men in its dash. Other reports give Confederates a loss of 5 men and 18 prisoners with one Union man wounded.

Grant's Headquarters in Monterey, TN (Michie, TN)

A claimed 10,000 infantry & cavalry of the Union Advance Guard entered the Confederate camp at Monterey holding only about 3,500 infantry & cavalry. For about an hour straight, the Confederates endured heavy shelling from Union artillery. Per General Pope's orders, the Union drove Confederates out of the camp, looting and burning the camp in the process. Federals captured about 15 men here.

The 2nd Iowa continued until it came to a bridge opposed by Washington's Louisiana Battery and Colonel Kelly's men of 3rd Tennessee Cavalry Regiment. The 2nd Iowa charged into canister fire and lost one killed and three wounded. The 2nd Iowa retired some distance away. Kelly reported one or two of his men killed and no mention of captured. Following the Union's capture of Monterey, the area became the site of the Union Army's headquarters of operations for a majority of the Siege of Corinth.

=== Farmington ===
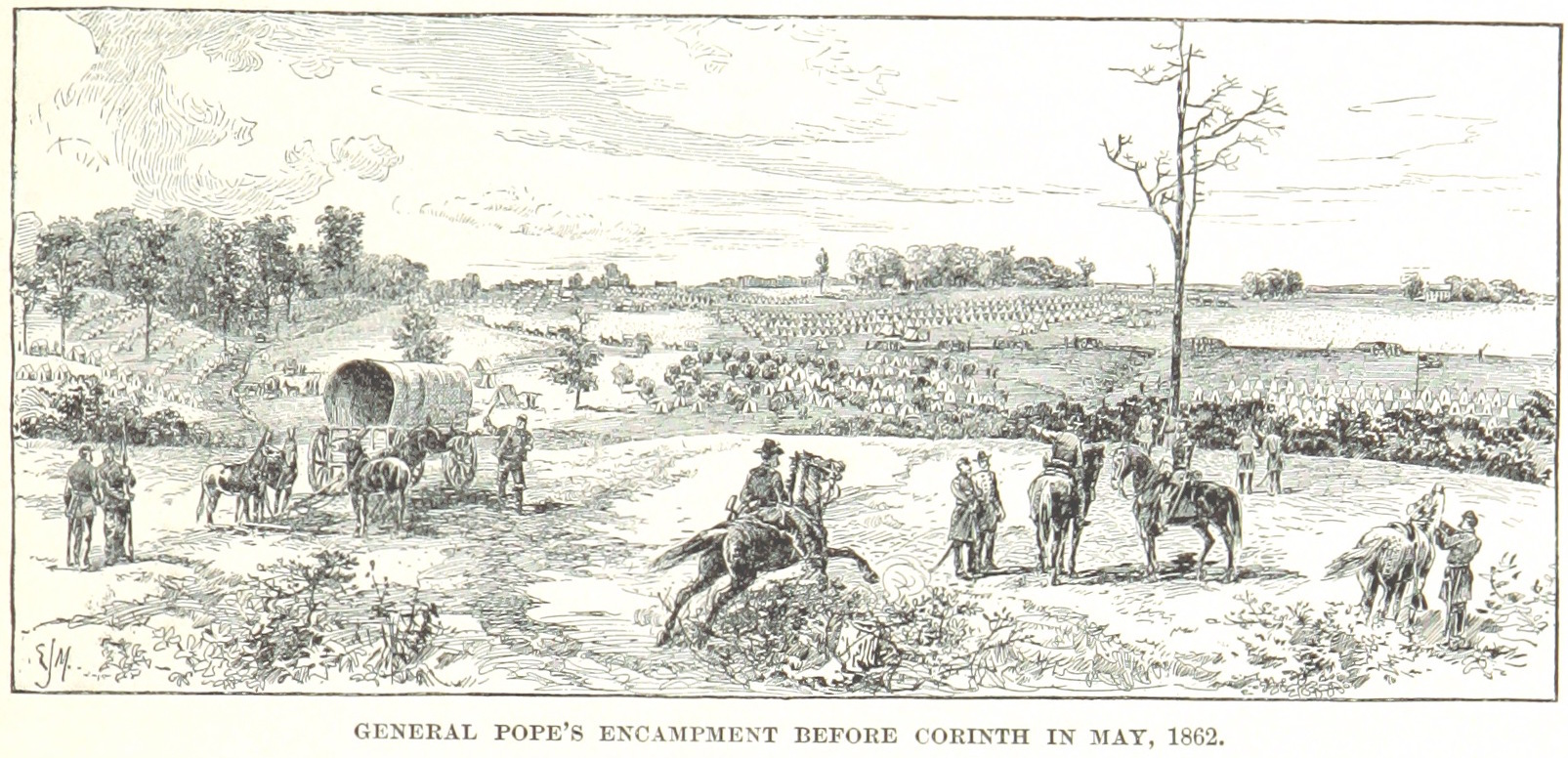
Pope's encampment at Corinth

Of Halleck's wing commanders Pope proved to be the most aggressive during the campaign. Pope led the army's Left Wing and was furthest away from Halleck's headquarters in Monterey, near Mount Olive Church. On May 3, Pope moved forward along the Monterey-Farmington Road and captured the town of Farmington only a few miles from Corinth. Instead of moving the center wing under Buell forward, Halleck ordered Pope to withdraw and realign with Buell. Beauregard ordered Van Dorn to attack Pope's advanced wing on May 9. Pope made a successful withdrawal and rejoined with Buell. Bragg, who also participated in the attack, had 25,000 men. The Union Army had 12,000 troops on hand. Van Dorn's corps, barely engaged, had 9 casualties. Daniel Ruggles' division of Bragg's Corp, on the other hand, which bore the brunt of the fighting, suffered casualties of 8 dead, 89 wounded and two missing or captured. The Union Army had 16 killed, 148 wounded and 14 missing or captured.

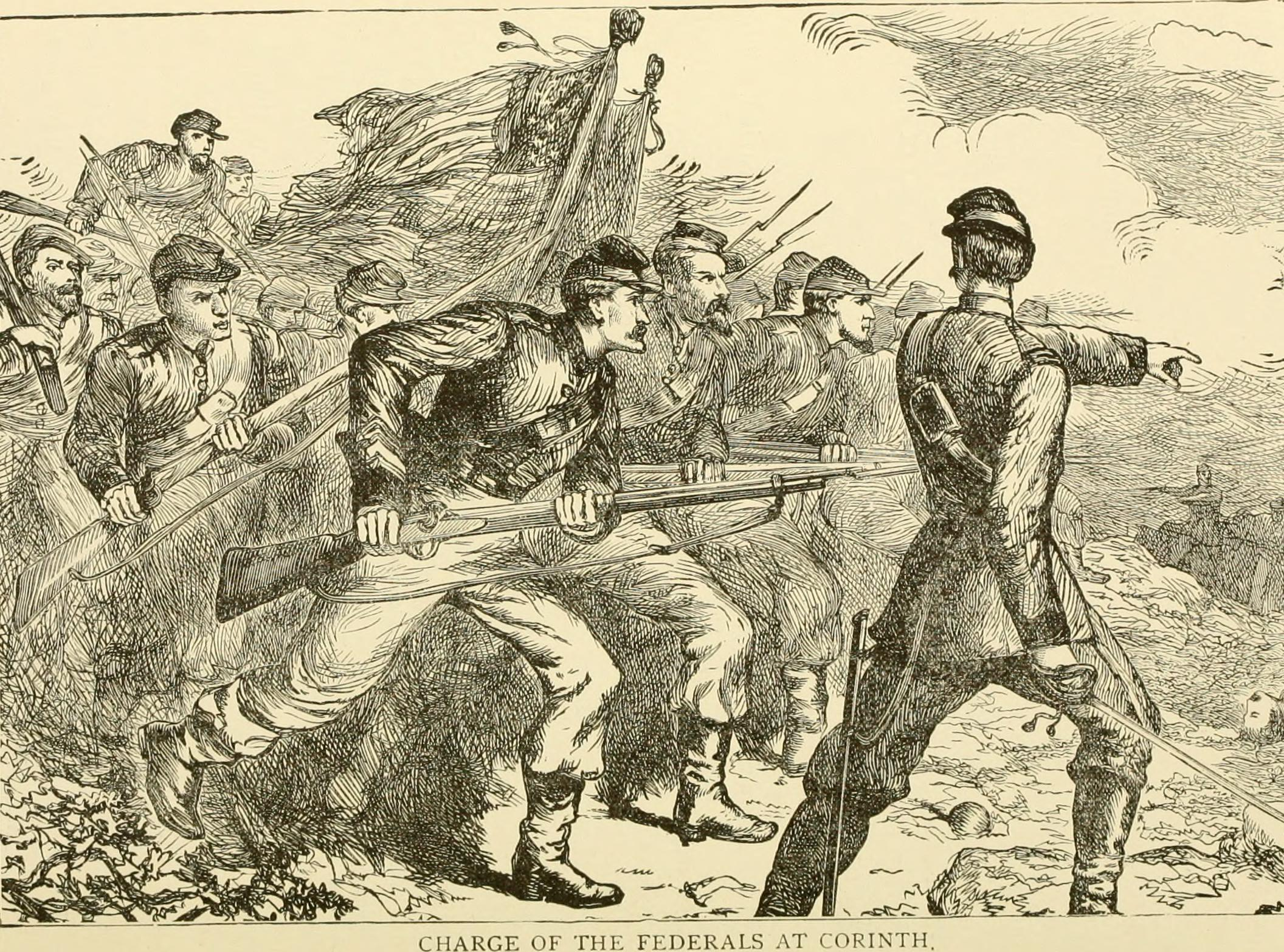
Charge of the Federals

The 8th Wisconsin Volunteer Infantry Regiment was ordered to draw the enemy out as to count their numbers and they withdrew to a swamp north of town. Wisconsin 8th reported 5 killed, 14 severely wounded, and 19 slightly wounded. The eagle, Old Abe, accompanied the Wisconsin 8th Infantry.

The 5th Minnesota Infantry Regiment arrived in Corinth on May 24 and reported to Pope, in the field before Corinth, Miss., and were assigned to the Second Brigade, First Division, Army of the Mississippi. The regiment had hardly time to establish its camp and realize its surroundings before it was brought into action. On the 28th of May, four days after it had reached the front, it participated in the tail end of the battle of Farmington, contributing a number of killed and wounded.

=== Russell's House ===
As the wings of Halleck's army group began to align themselves in front of Corinth, Major General William Tecumseh Sherman proposed a plan of attack against the Confederate brigade of Brigadier General James R. Chalmers, which had created a strong defensive position at the Russell house along the Confederate front lines. Sherman met with generals Halleck and Thomas on May 16 to discuss his plan. Sherman planned for the brigades of Colonel Morgan L. Smith and Brigadier General James W. Denver to lead the attack with Brigadier General Stephen A. Hurlbut's division lending support. On May 17 the attack commenced with Denver on the left, Smith in the center and Hurlbut's reserve to the right. Chalmers offered a stubborn resistance while some of his men fired from within the Russell house. The Confederates almost succeeded with a flank attack against Smith's right but were repulsed by Colonel Thomas Kilby Smith and the 54th Ohio Infantry. As soon as a battery from the 1st Illinois Artillery deployed the advantage was in favor of the Union forces. Chalmers retreated beyond Philips Creek near the Russell house property and Morgan Smith's brigade occupied high ground on which the house stood. Sherman's losses were 10 killed and 31 wounded all of which were from Smith's brigade. Confederate losses were unknown but Sherman reported 12 dead left on the field. That same day a division under Brigadier General Thomas W. Sherman drove off a Confederate force covering a crossing along Bridge Creek.

=== Widow Surratt Farm ===
On May 21 Major General William "Bull" Nelson ordered Colonel Thomas D. Sedgwick to conduct a reconnaissance-in-force against the Confederate trenches along Bridge Creek near widow Surratt's farm Sedgwick moved forward from the Union trenches occupied by Brigadier General Thomas J. Wood's division and deployed the 20th Kentucky infantry at the edge of a clearing and the 1st Kentucky infantry to the left facing a densely wooded area. Shortly after deployment the Kentuckians came under fire. The Confederate resistance was so severe Sedgwick was forced to fall back. Sedgwick brought forward artillery and the 2nd Kentucky infantry while Wood lent cavalry support from his division. The Confederates attempted a flank attack against the 1st Kentucky but the Union artillery (personally supervised by Captain Alvan C. Gillem of Buell's staff) and the 31st Indiana infantry in reserve stabilized the line. The Confederates made three more attempts to turn the Union flank until retiring to a creek beyond the Surratt farm. Nelson ordered Sedgwick to hold his position until nightfall, then return to the Union camp. A week later Buell mounted an attack to gain the high ground surrounding the Surratt farm.

=== Double Log House ===
On May 27 Halleck ordered Sherman to drive the Confederates from a log house along the Corinth Road and make a strong demonstration against Corinth itself if possible. At the edge of a cotton field along Sherman's front was a double log house which the Confederates had converted into a block house by removing the chinking between the logs. Sherman formed an attacking column with Morgan L. Smith's brigade on the left and James W. Denver's brigade on the right. John A. Logan's brigade (from John A. McClernand's reserve corps) and James C. Veatch's brigade (from Stephen A. Hurlbut's division) were also brought up for support. Colonel Ezra Taylor fired several artillery rounds to signal the infantry attack. Denver and Smith quickly overtook the log house by storm and secured the hilltop position. The Confederates rallied and drove in Sherman's skirmishers but the counterattack was repulsed by the main line of infantry with artillery support. The following day the rest of Sherman's division and artillery moved forward to the new position which offered a good vantage point into Corinth itself. Grant and Thomas were both present on the field during this engagement, giving approval for the behavior of operation.

=== Surratt's Hill ===
Confederate infantry had been using a hill in the vicinity of the Widow Surratt farm for picket outposts. With all his wings in line, Halleck ordered Buell to clear the Confederates off the Surratt farm hill. Buell chose Major General Alexander M. McCook's reserve division to seize the hill to be used as a staging point for a further attack against Corinth. On May 27 McCook organized his brigades into line of attack intending to overwhelm the Confederates by surprise and overwhelming force. The brigades of Brigadier General Lovell H. Rousseau and Brigadier General Richard W. Johnson led the advance, side by side. Colonel Frederick S. Stumbaugh's brigade followed in support of Johnson and Colonel Robert L. McCook's brigade (from Thomas W. Sherman's division) in support of Rousseau. Johnson's brigade encountered some heavy skirmishing but the hill was taken in short time. McCook's division entrenched and brought heavy artillery to the new position and immediately began to shell the Confederates. Beauregard's artillery responded with minimal effort. The engagement at the Surratt farm hill allowed Halleck to bring forward siege guns for the bombardment of Corinth.

=== Bridge Creek ===
Federal Earthworks (Mid-May) north of Corinth during the Siege

On May 28 Nelson ordered Sedgwick to seize a Confederate-held crossing of Bridge Creek, a small tributary of the Tuscumbia River. Sedgwick moved his brigade out from the main Union trenches with the 2nd and 20th Kentucky infantry regiments in the lead. Sedgwick drove in the Confederate pickets then encountered a larger force guarding the bridge. The Kentucky infantry managed to gain hold of the eastern end of the bridge while Sedgwick ordered forward the 31st Indiana infantry and Captain John Mendenhall's artillery battery. These reinforcements and artillery forced the Confederates to abandon the bridge completely.

== Retreat ==
With the Federal army preparing to lay siege to the town, a Confederate council of war decided to retreat. Beauregard saved his army by a hoax. Some of the men were given three days' rations and ordered to prepare for an attack. As expected, one or two went over to the Union with that news. The preliminary bombardment began, and Union forces maneuvered for position. During the night of May 29, the Confederate army moved out. They used the Mobile and Ohio Railroad to carry the sick and wounded, the heavy artillery, and tons of supplies. When a train arrived, the troops cheered as though reinforcements were arriving. They set up dummy Quaker guns along the defensive earthworks. Camp fires were kept burning, and buglers and drummers played. The rest of the men slipped away undetected, withdrawing to Tupelo, Mississippi. When Union patrols entered Corinth on the morning of May 30, they found the Confederate troops gone. The Union forces took control and made it the base for their operations to seize control of the Mississippi River valley, and especially the Confederate stronghold of Vicksburg, Mississippi.

== Aftermath ==
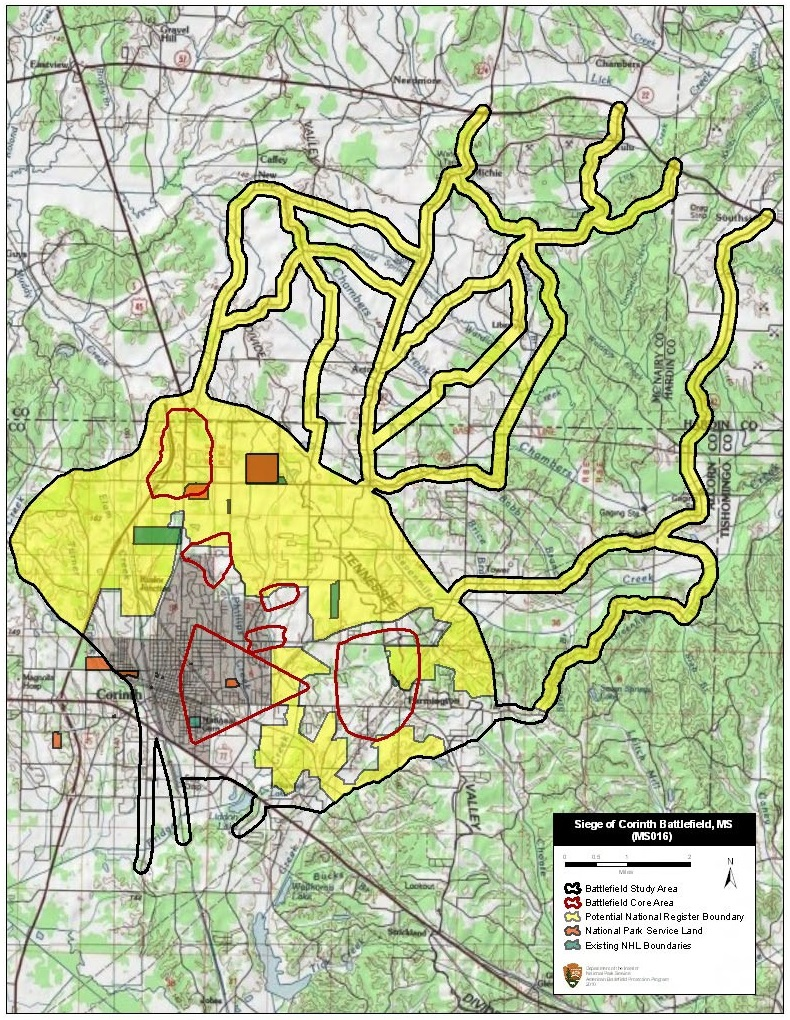
Map of the siege of Corinth battlefield core and study areas by the American Battlefield Protection Program

Pope, whose aggressiveness exceeded his strategic capabilities, remarked in his memoirs that Halleck's cautious campaign failed to take full advantage of a glittering array of talented Union officers, including "Grant, [W.T.] Sherman, Sheridan, Thomas, McPherson, Logan, Buell, Rosecrans and many others I might mention."

A Confederate army led by Van Dorn attempted to retake the city in October 1862, but was defeated in the Second Battle of Corinth by a Union army under the command of Rosecrans. At times during the second battle, Confederate forces seemed to have the upper hand but failed to follow up on their successes, leading to a devastating defeat for Confederate forces in that region. Rosecrans had the opportunity to crush rebel forces during the battle but failed to follow up his victory, allowing Van Dorn to escape from destruction. Corinth ultimately led to the operations that opened the Mississippi River valley, which was considered by Halleck as, "the opening of the Mississippi River will be to us of more advantage than the capture of forty Richmonds".

== Battlefield preservation ==
The American Battlefield Trust and its partners have preserved more than 820 acres of the Corinth battlefield through mid-2023.

== See also ==
- Corinth National Cemetery
- List of costliest American Civil War land battles
- Second Battle of Corinth
- Siege and Battle of Corinth Sites
- Troop engagements of the American Civil War, 1862
