= Purdy, Tennessee =

Unincorporated community in Tennessee, US

Purdy
- Unincorporated Community
- Interactive map of Purdy
- Coordinates: 35°13′36″N 88°31′50″W
- Country: United States
- State: Tennessee
- County: McNairy
- Postal code: 38357
- Area code: 731
- GNIS feature ID: 1298706

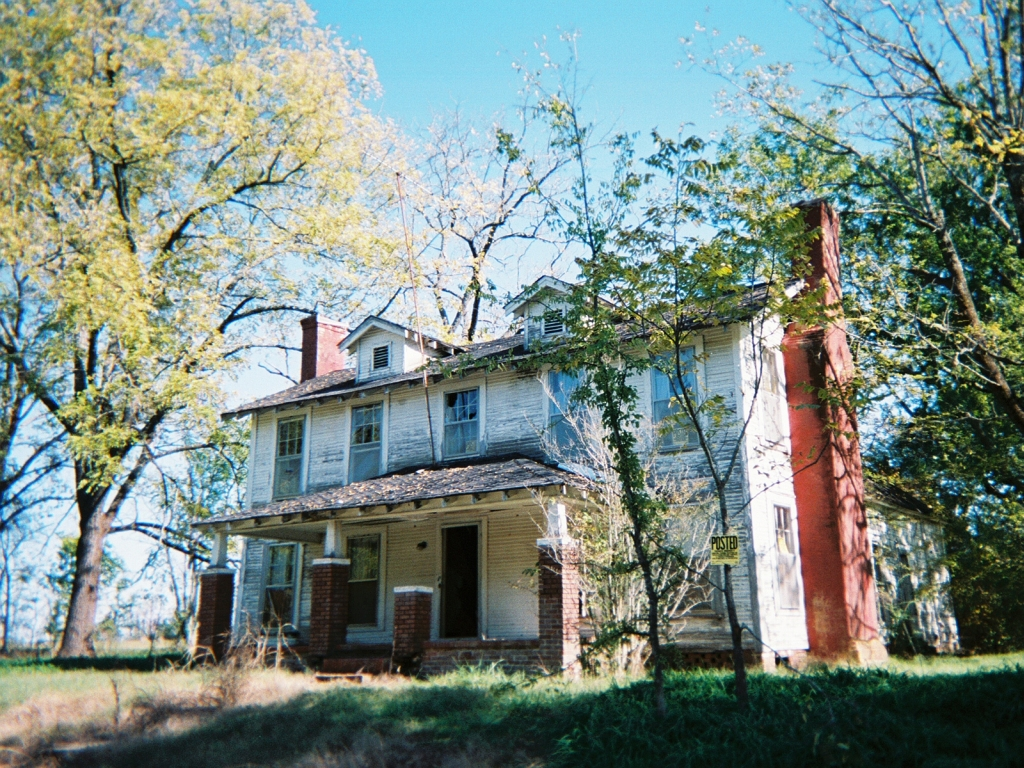
The Hurst mansion dates back to the Civil War era. It is one of the oldest dwellings in the community. In 2007, the building is abandoned.

Purdy is a rural unincorporated community 3.5 mi (5.6 km) northeast of Selmer in McNairy County, Tennessee. Until 1890, Purdy was the county seat of McNairy County.

Failed development in the 1850s kept the community rural thereafter, without industries, major business ventures or tourism. During the Civil War the town was a crossroads, but during the war damage was done to the town which led to its decline.

== Demographics ==
In 1850, according to Census records, the population of Purdy was 260. The population was residing in 43 dwellings in the district.

== Geography ==

Purdy is located 3.5 mi (5.6 km) northeast of Selmer in McNairy County.

The elevation above sea level is 570 ft (173.7 m).

== History ==
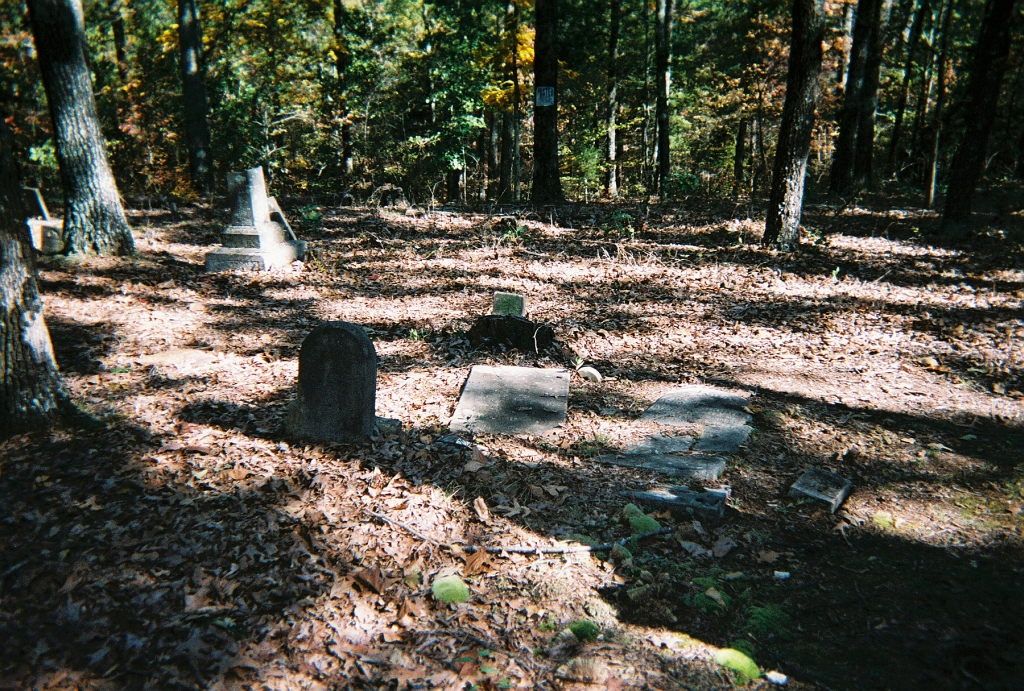
Graves on the Purdy cemetery date back to the early 1800s and the Civil War era (2007).

Purdy was platted in 1825 by Col. John Purdy, and named for him. Purdy was the county seat of McNairy County until 1890.

=== Failed railroad development 1850s ===
In the 1850s, citizens of Purdy refused to support a railroad line through their community, while residents of nearby Selmer supported a railroad through their town. The railroad brought business and wealth to Selmer and the community of Purdy remained rural.

=== County seat changed 1890 ===
In 1890, due to the increasing economic development of Selmer following the railroad, the county seat was moved from Purdy to Selmer.

== Newspaper ==
Purdy's newspaper is the Independent Appeal, which serves all of McNairy County. It was founded in 1902. It is located at 111 N. 2nd St. in Selmer.

== Economy ==
The community's main source of income is agriculture (especially cotton).

=== Historical ===
After the abolition of slavery, sharecropping was the primary means of income for low income families in the area. Mostly for the cultivation of cotton, land would be used by sharecroppers in return for a share of the crop to the landowner.

=== Modern ===
Modern machines such as the cotton picker have made manual cultivation obsolete over time as they took over work from laborers.

In 2007, Purdy was a rural unincorporated community with no industries, major business ventures or tourism.

== Notable people ==
- Marcus Joseph Wright (1831–1922), military governor of Columbus, Kentucky, in the Civil War and author, born in Purdy.
- John Vines Wright (1828–1908), a member of the United States House of Representatives, born in Purdy.
