= McNairy County, Tennessee =

County in Tennessee, United States

- County
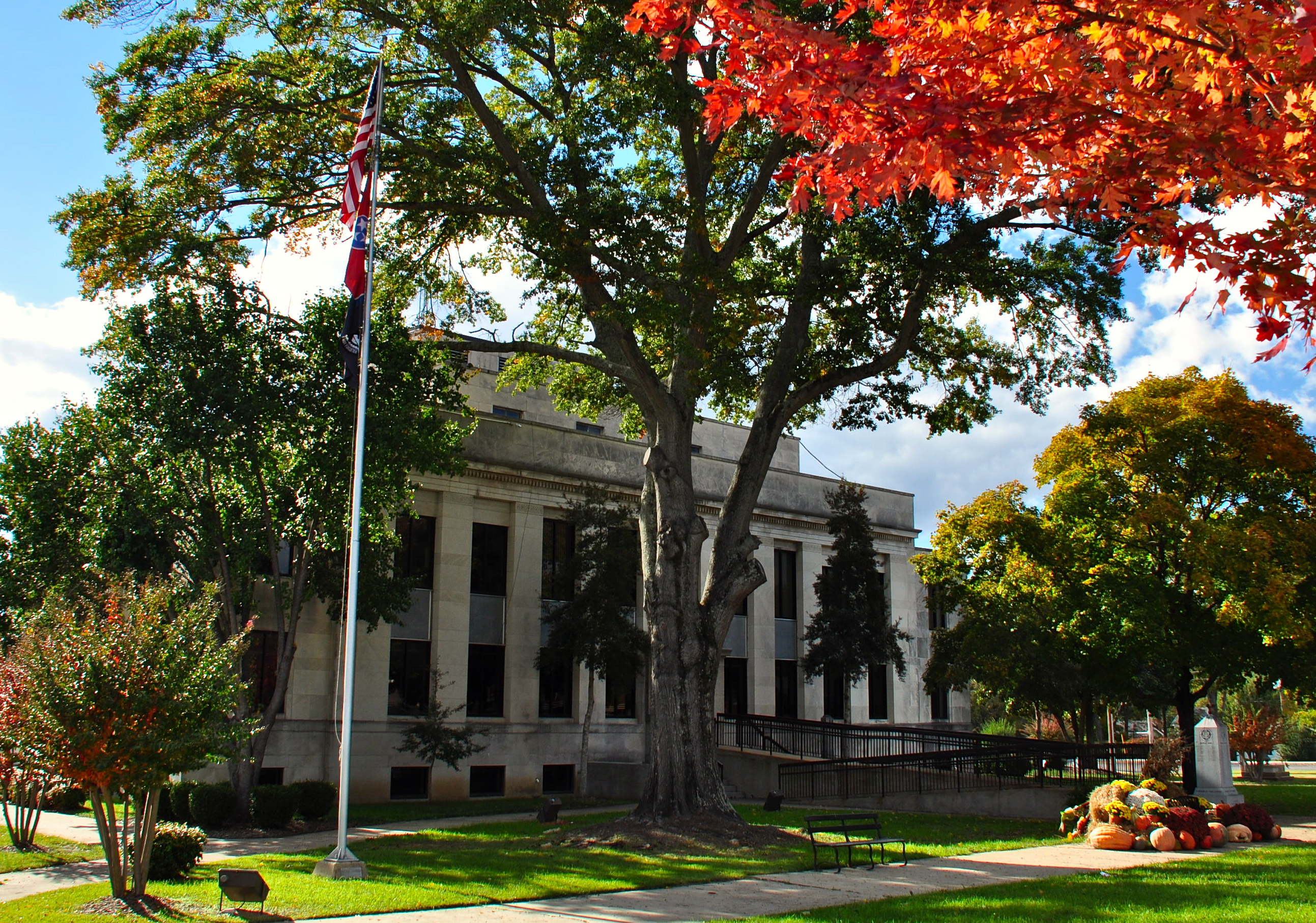
- McNairy County Courthouse in Selmer

- Flag Seal

- Location within the U.S. state of Tennessee
- Coordinates: 35°11′N 88°34′W
- Country: United States
- State: Tennessee
- Founded: October 8, 1823
- Named for: John McNairy
- Seat: Selmer
- Largest city: Selmer

Government
  - Mayor: Larry Smith

Area
  - Total: 564 sq mi (1,460 km^{2})
  - Land: 563 sq mi (1,460 km^{2})
  - Water: 0.8 sq mi (2.1 km^{2}) 0.1%

Population (2020)
  - Total: 25,866
  - Estimate (2025): 26,236 ▲
  - Density: 45.9/sq mi (17.7/km^{2})
- Time zone: UTC−6 (Central)
  - Summer (DST): UTC−5 (CDT)
- Congressional district: 8th
- Website: www.mcnairycountytn.org

McNairy County is a county located in the U.S. state of Tennessee. As of the 2020 census, the population was 25,866. The county seat and largest city is Selmer. McNairy County is located along Tennessee's border with the state of Mississippi.

Sheriff Buford Pusser, whose story was told in the Walking Tall series of movies, was the sheriff of McNairy County from 1964 to 1970.

McNairy County is the location of the Coon Creek Science Center, a notable fossil site that preserves Late Cretaceous marine shells and vertebrate remains (such as mosasaurs).

The postwar musical environment of the county played a pivotal role in the development of popular music. Influential disc jockey Dewey Phillips hailed from Adamsville, Tennessee. Carl Perkins made the first recordings of his career in the home studio of Stanton Littlejohn at Eastview, Tennessee. Perkins and Elvis Presley had their first meeting at one of Presley's earliest road performances in Bethel Springs, Tennessee.

== History ==
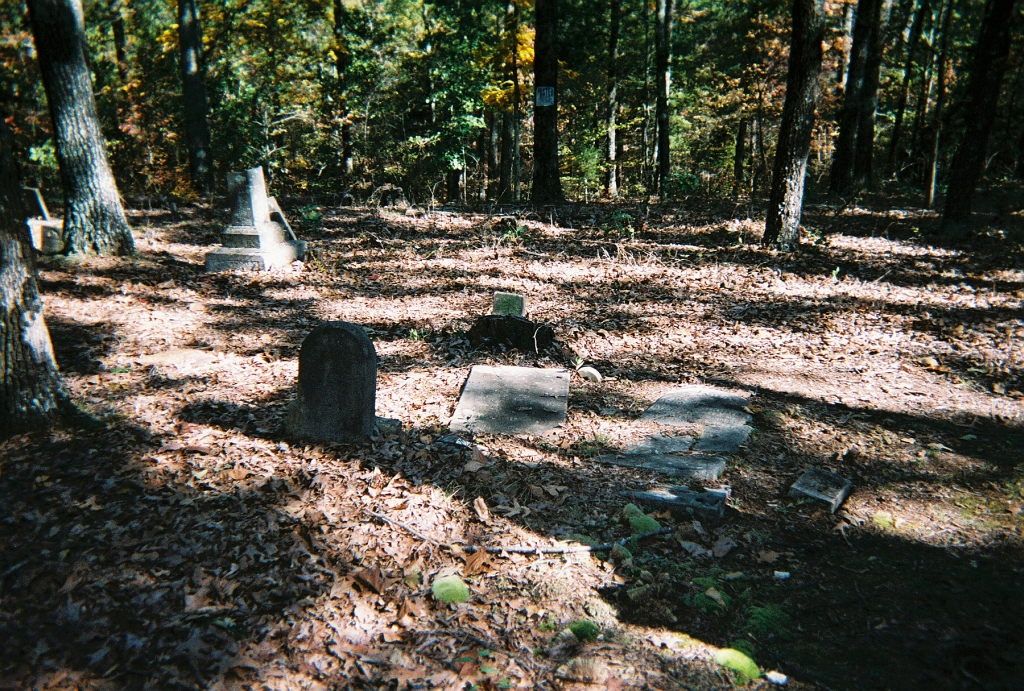
Purdy was the county seat of McNairy County until 1890. Graves in the Purdy cemetery date back to the early 1800s. (2007)

McNairy County was formed in 1823 from parts of Hardin County, and was named for Judge John McNairy.

Purdy was the county seat of McNairy County until 1890. Since then, Selmer has been the county seat.

During the Civil War, McNairy County was among the most divided counties in Tennessee. In Tennessee's Ordinance of Secession referendum on June 8, 1861, McNairy County voted to secede by a margin of 1,318 to 586. However, earlier on February 9, 1861, McNairy County voters had voted against holding a secession convention by a margin of 916 to 811. Despite the strong overall support for secession, there was a strong Unionist minority in the northern half adjacent to solidly pro-Union Henderson County.

The history of McNairy County also includes a very small, almost-unheard-of school. The Trantham School, listed on the 1940 census, operated from 1922 through 1948, with a single teacher serving grades 1 through 8.

=== Sheriff Buford Pusser ===
Buford Pusser served as the sheriff of McNairy County from 1964 to 1970. The courthouse and jail in Selmer were his base of operations. He gained prominence for his fight against illegal distilleries, bootleggers, gambling establishments, and corruption in the county. His story has been made famous in the Walking Tall series of movies starring Joe Don Baker, Bo Svenson, Brian Dennehy, and Dwayne Johnson, and in numerous documentaries and books. However, in August 2025, following a three-year investigation conducted together with the Tennessee Bureau of Investigation, the local district attorney's office said they had sufficient evidence to ask for an indictment of Pusser (if he was still alive) for the 1967 murder of his wife, Pauline Mullins Pusser.

== Newspapers ==
The oldest existing business in McNairy County is its newspaper, the Independent Appeal, which was founded as the McNairy County Independent in 1902. It is located in Selmer.

In 2008, Tom Evans, a former reporter and photographer for the Independent Appeal, formed his own weekly newspaper, The McNairy County News.

== School District ==
The schools fall under the McNairy County School District. The superintendent is Greg Martin The district is a public school district, serving students in kindergarten through twelfth grade. It serves over 4,000 student with 8 schools.

=== Schools ===
Elementary Schools

- Adamsville Elementary School
  - Mr. Danny Combs, Principal
- Bethel Springs Elementary School
  - Mr. Terry Moore, Principal
- Michie Elementary School
  - Dr. Matt Alred, Principal
- Ramer Elementary School
  - Dr. Sondra Kiser, Principal
- Selmer Elementary School
  - Mrs. Pamela Simon, Principal

Middle Schools

- Selmer Middle School
  - Dr. Brenda Armstrong, Principal

High Schools

- Adamsville High School
  - Mr. Steve Killingsworth, Principal
- McNairy Central High School
  - Dr. Jerry Pyron, Principal

=== Board of education ===
The district's board of education has 7 members elected from each of the 7 districts that make up McNairy County.

=== Controversies ===
The Selmer Elementary School principal failed to report abuse claims after evidence revealed Principal Simon was notified of abuse allegations on numerous occasions between October 2021 and December 2021. The report states that Simon did not notify the Department of Children Services of these claims, which as a school employee is a violation of Tennessee law as a mandatory reporter.

A McNairy County school board member was charged with choking his teen co-worker in May 2023.

== Geography ==
According to the U.S. Census Bureau, the county has a total area of 564 square miles (1,460 km^{2}), of which 563 square miles (1,460 km^{2}) is land and 0.8 square miles (2.1 km^{2}) (0.1%) is water.

The major highways U.S. Route 64 (east–west) and U.S. Route 45 (north–south) pass through McNairy County and intersect in Selmer. Between the late 1990s and mid 2010s, both highways were upgraded to four lane divided highways, giving the county quicker access to the surrounding areas. McNairy County's position on Route 64 places it on the historic Lee Highway, which stretches from New York to San Francisco.

State Highways 22 and 57 also pass through the county. SR 22 along the eastern portion intersecting with US 64 in Adamsville, and SR 57 through the southern portion intersecting with US 45 in Eastview. Highways 22 and 57 intersect as well in Michie.

=== Adjacent counties ===
- Chester County (north)
- Hardin County (east)
- Alcorn County, Mississippi (south)
- Hardeman County (west)

=== State protected areas ===
- Big Hill Pond State Park

== Demographics ==
Historical population
Census	Pop.	Note	%±
1830	5,697		—
1840	9,385		64.7%
1850	12,864		37.1%
1860	14,732		14.5%
1870	12,726		−13.6%
1880	17,271		35.7%
1890	15,510		−10.2%
1900	17,760		14.5%
1910	16,536		−6.9%
1920	18,350		11.0%
1930	19,901		8.5%
1940	20,424		2.6%
1950	20,390		−0.2%
1960	18,085		−11.3%
1970	18,369		1.6%
1980	22,525		22.6%
1990	22,422		−0.5%
2000	24,653		10.0%
2010	26,075		5.8%
2020	25,866		−0.8%
2025 (est.)	26,236	▲	1.4%
U.S. Decennial Census; 1790-1960 1900-1990; 1990-2000 2010-2014

=== 2020 census ===
As of the 2020 census, there were 25,866 people, 10,716 households, and 6,724 families residing in the county.

The median age was 44.5 years, with 21.1% of residents under the age of 18 and 22.1% aged 65 years or older; for every 100 females there were 96.7 males, and for every 100 females age 18 and over there were 94.8 males.

Less than 0.1% of residents lived in urban areas, while 100.0% lived in rural areas.

There were 10,716 households in the county, of which 28.0% had children under the age of 18 living in them. Of all households, 48.2% were married-couple households, 19.1% were households with a male householder and no spouse or partner present, and 27.2% were households with a female householder and no spouse or partner present. About 30.0% of all households were made up of individuals and 15.3% had someone living alone who was 65 years of age or older.

There were 12,268 housing units, of which 12.7% were vacant. Among occupied housing units, 75.7% were owner-occupied and 24.3% were renter-occupied. The homeowner vacancy rate was 2.6% and the rental vacancy rate was 7.7%.

The racial makeup of the county was 88.9% White, 6.0% Black or African American, 0.3% American Indian and Alaska Native, 0.3% Asian, <0.1% Native Hawaiian and Pacific Islander, 0.7% from some other race, and 3.9% from two or more races; Hispanic or Latino residents of any race comprised 1.7% of the population.

=== Racial and ethnic composition ===
McNairy County racial composition
Race	Num.	Perc.
White (non-Hispanic)	22,847	88.33%
Black or African American (non-Hispanic)	1,545	5.97%
Native American	55	0.21%
Asian	78	0.3%
Other/Mixed	903	3.49%
Hispanic or Latino	438	1.69%

=== 2000 census ===
As of the census of 2000, there were 24,653 people, 9,980 households, and 7,135 families residing in the county. The population density was 44 people per square mile (17 people/km^{2}). There were 11,219 housing units at an average density of 20 units per square mile (7.7/km^{2}). The racial makeup of the county was 92.22% White, 6.23% Black or African American, 0.20% Native American, 0.13% Asian, 0.24% from other races, and 0.98% from two or more races. 0.93% of the population were Hispanic or Latino of any race.

There were 9,980 households, out of which 29.90% had children under the age of 18 living with them, 58.00% were married couples living together, 9.90% had a female householder with no husband present, and 28.50% were non-families. 25.90% of all households were made up of individuals, and 12.50% had someone living alone who was 65 years of age or older. The average household size was 2.42 and the average family size was 2.89.

In the county, the population was spread out, with 23.60% under the age of 18, 8.10% from 18 to 24, 26.70% from 25 to 44, 25.60% from 45 to 64, and 15.90% who were 65 years of age or older. The median age was 39 years. For every 100 females there were 94.20 males. For every 100 females age 18 and over, there were 91.40 males.

The median income for a household in the county was $30,154, and the median income for a family was $36,045. Males had a median income of $30,028 versus $21,450 for females. The per capita income for the county was $16,385. About 11.80% of families and 15.90% of the population were below the poverty line, including 19.00% of those under age 18 and 20.80% of those age 65 or over.

== Parks and attractions ==
McNairy County is the site of 5,000-acre (20 km^{2}) Big Hill Pond State Park, which is forested with timberland and hardwood bottomland. The county is also the location of the Coon Creek Science Center, a notable fossil site, located in Leapwood over the Coon Creek Formation, which preserves Late Cretaceous marine shells and vertebrate remains (such as mosasaurs) left there 70 million years ago.

== Communities ==
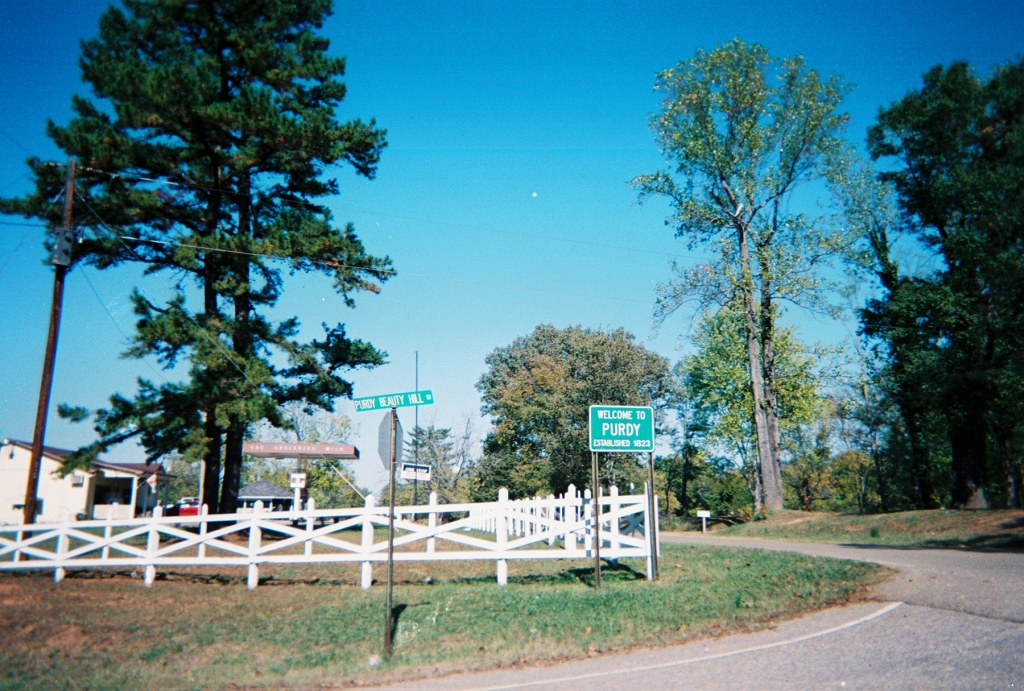
Purdy

=== Cities ===
- Adamsville (partly in Hardin County)
- Bethel Springs
- Ramer
- Selmer (county seat and largest city)

=== Towns ===
- Eastview
- Finger
- Guys
- Hornsby (mostly in Hardeman County)
- Milledgeville (partial)
- Michie
- Stantonville

=== Census-designated place ===
- Chewalla

=== Unincorporated communities ===
- Acton
- Caffey
- Falcon (neighborhood in Selmer)
- Leapwood
- Liberty
- McNairy
- Purdy
- Pocahontas (mostly in Hardeman County)
- Tulu (neighborhood in Michie)

== Politics ==
United States presidential election results for McNairy County, Tennessee
Year	Republican		Democratic		Third party(ies)	
Year	No.	%	No.	%	No.	%
1912	616	22.22%	1,155	41.67%	1,001	36.11%
1916	1,616	52.50%	1,461	47.47%	1	0.03%
1920	3,212	63.29%	1,863	36.71%	0	0.00%
1924	1,625	58.54%	1,125	40.53%	26	0.94%
1928	2,326	65.80%	1,209	34.20%	0	0.00%
1932	1,350	40.63%	1,961	59.01%	12	0.36%
1936	1,613	47.40%	1,742	51.19%	48	1.41%
1940	2,550	50.66%	2,484	49.34%	0	0.00%
1944	2,697	61.17%	1,712	38.83%	0	0.00%
1948	2,390	48.10%	2,267	45.62%	312	6.28%
1952	3,426	55.94%	2,698	44.06%	0	0.00%
1956	3,349	57.37%	2,403	41.16%	86	1.47%
1960	3,310	59.15%	2,173	38.83%	113	2.02%
1964	3,109	50.94%	2,994	49.06%	0	0.00%
1968	2,979	41.21%	1,377	19.05%	2,872	39.73%
1972	4,774	73.23%	1,610	24.70%	135	2.07%
1976	3,388	43.80%	4,293	55.49%	55	0.71%
1980	4,603	54.06%	3,801	44.64%	110	1.29%
1984	4,776	55.34%	3,825	44.32%	30	0.35%
1988	4,625	56.46%	3,510	42.85%	56	0.68%
1992	4,093	42.66%	4,691	48.89%	811	8.45%
1996	3,960	46.18%	4,050	47.22%	566	6.60%
2000	4,897	54.48%	4,003	44.53%	89	0.99%
2004	5,787	58.31%	4,101	41.32%	36	0.36%
2008	7,135	68.46%	3,131	30.04%	156	1.50%
2012	7,015	71.57%	2,645	26.98%	142	1.45%
2016	7,841	78.11%	1,848	18.41%	349	3.48%
2020	9,093	80.65%	1,943	17.23%	239	2.12%
2024	9,437	83.76%	1,727	15.33%	103	0.91%

McNairy County is currently overwhelmingly Republican. Even before the rapid trend of the upland South away from the Democratic Party, McNairy County – though not to the same extent as nearby Wayne, Henderson and Hardin Counties – was a Unionist Republican enclave in historically Democratic West Tennessee. Research in the 1910s suggested that Republicanism in Southern states tended to be associated with areas having less productive soils. In west central Tennessee, which includes McNairy County, soils are shallow, humus-poor and easily erodible Highland Rim soils, which were much less suitable for plantation farming than the rest of Middle and West Tennessee.

== See also ==
- National Register of Historic Places listings in McNairy County, Tennessee
