= Coon Creek Science Center =

Science center in Adamsville, Tennessee, US

Coordinates: 35.33361°N 88.43050°W

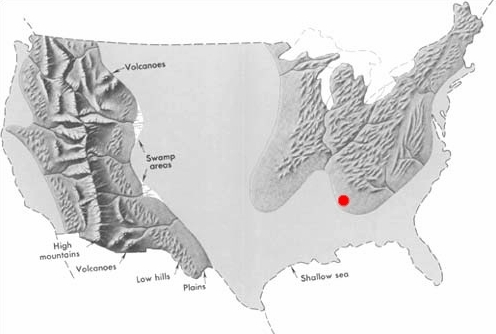
US in the Cretaceous Period Location of Coon Creek Science Center

The Coon Creek Science Center is a science center and fossil finding site at 2985 Hardin Graveyard Road in Adamsville, Tennessee.

The science center is situated on a 232 acres (94 ha) property on one of the most important fossil sites in North America. The Coon Creek Formation is a geologic formation located in western Tennessee and extreme northeast Mississippi. It is a sedimentary sandy marl deposit, Late Cretaceous in age, about 73 million years old. In the Late Cretaceous epoch, the Gulf of Mexico reached further north and West Tennessee was covered by water. The fossilization began when the water receded. Finds at the Coon Creek site range from marine shells, crabs and snails to vertebrate.

== See also ==
- List of museums in Tennessee
