= Bossier High School =

Bossier High School may refer to:

- Bossier High School (322 Colquitt Street, Bossier City, Louisiana), former high school listed on the National Register of Historic Places
- Bossier High School (Louisiana), current high school, also listed on the National Register of Historic Places
