= Clarence Henry =

Clarence Henry may refer to:

- Clarence Henry (boxer) (1926–1999), American boxer
- Clarence "Frogman" Henry (1937–2024), American rhythm and blues singer and pianist
- Clarence "Chink" Henry (1910–1974), American organized labor leader and civil rights activist
