= Ash Point Plantation House =

Historic house in Louisiana, United States

- U.S. National Register of Historic Places
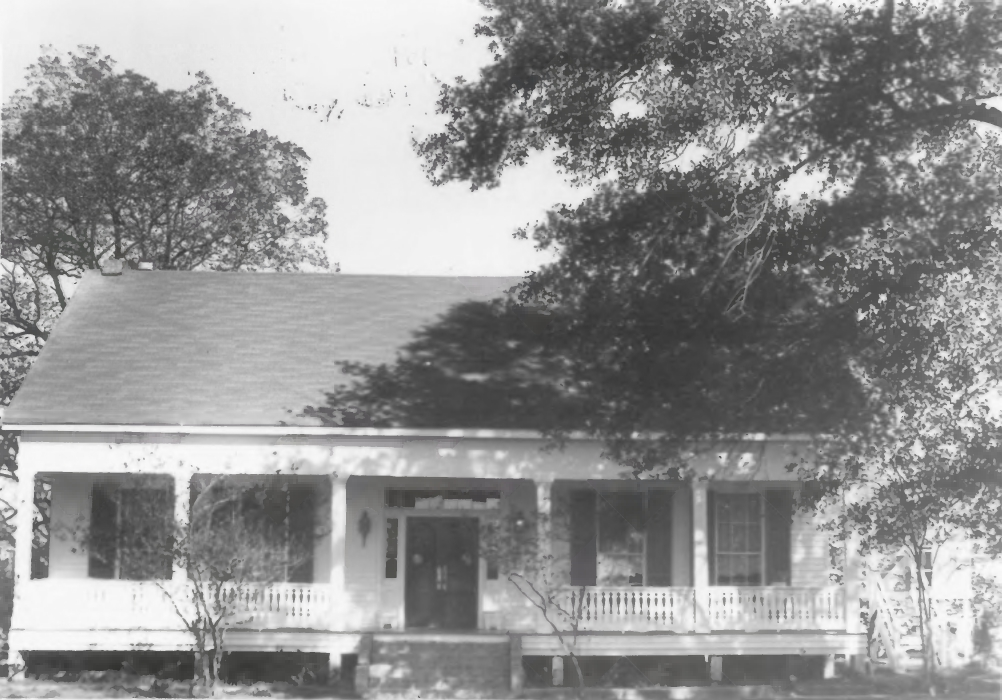

- Location within Louisiana Location within the United States
- Location: North of Louisiana Highway 71 about 0.92 miles (1.48 km) southeast of Taylortown and 2.43 miles (3.91 km) northwest of Elm Grove
- Coordinates: 32°22′42″N 93°35′01″W
- Area: less than one acre
- Built: c.1880
- Built by: Elam Sparks Dortch
- Architectural style: Greek Revival, Italianate
- NRHP reference No.: 82002757
- Added to NRHP: August 11, 1982

Ash Point Plantation House, also known as Woodlawn and erroneously as Cashpoint Plantation House, is located shortly north of Louisiana Highway 71 between Taylortown and Elm Grove in Bossier Parish, Louisiana. It was built in about 1880 and added to the National Register of Historic Places on August 11, 1982.

Its NRHP nomination described it as "a late provincial example of a Greek Revival raised cottage of moderate size. It is located off Louisiana Highway 71 in the flat cotton farming country of southern Bossier Parish. Several alterations were made in the twentieth century; however, in the judgment of the State Historic Preservation Office, the house retains sufficient integrity to warrant listing."

It was built as a one-story wood frame central hall plan raised plantation house with a rear wing for kitchen and dining room. It had one room on each side of the hall. It has a five-bay facade with a gallery with square posts having molded capitals. It has an entablature which is "unusually large". Greek Revival elements include transoms and side lights at the front and rear central doors. The house also has some Italianate influences: large round head panels of the front doors and "jig sawn balustrade work".

== See also ==
- National Register of Historic Places listings in Bossier Parish, Louisiana
