= Clarence "Chink" Henry =

American organized labor and civil rights leader

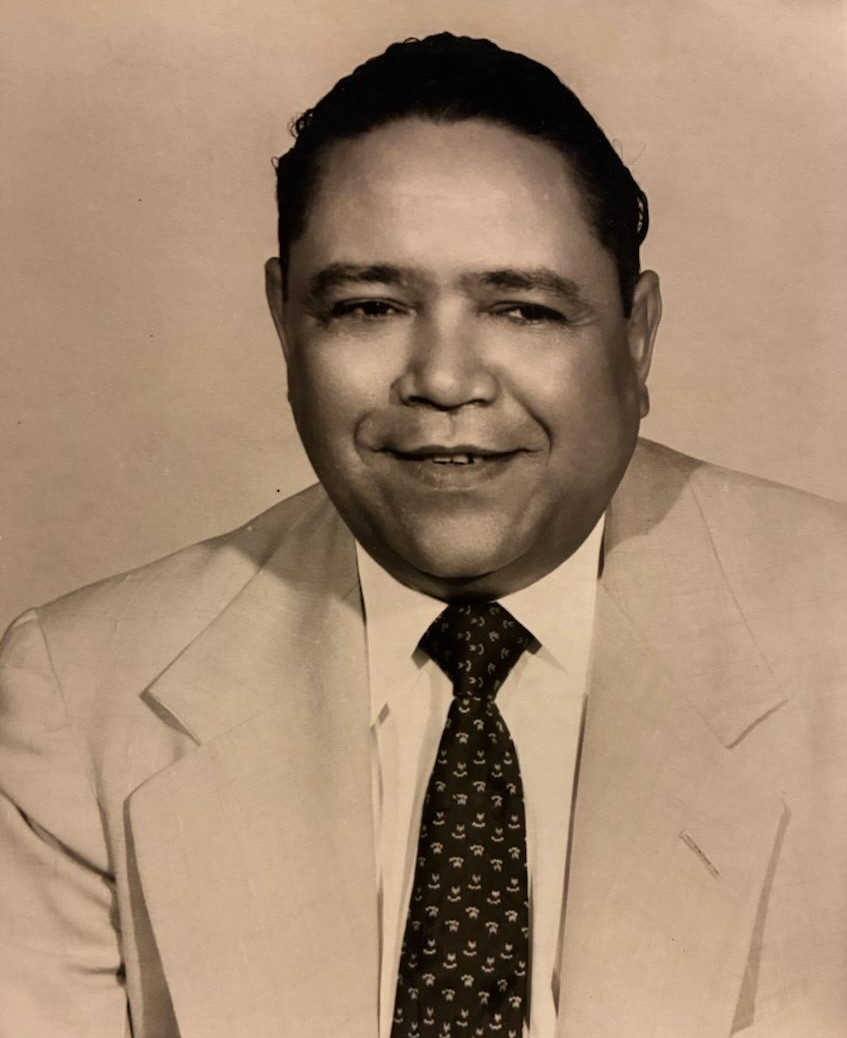
- Born: January 7, 1910; New Orleans, Louisiana
- Died: May 1, 1974 (aged 64); New Orleans, Louisiana
- Occupation: President of the International Longshoremen's Association Local 1419
- Known for: Organized Labor Leader and Civil Rights Activist

Clarence "Chink" Henry (1910-1974) was an American organized labor leader and civil rights activist in New Orleans, Louisiana. Henry was the President of the International Longshoremen's Association (ILA) Local 1419, American Federation of Labor and Congress of Industrial Organizations (AFL-CIO), for 20 years. Local 1419 ranked third in membership in the world and was the largest black branch of the ILA. Henry was deeply involved in the civil rights movement in New Orleans. Henry was active in the National Association for the Advancement of Colored People (NAACP) and Southern Christian Leadership Conference (SCLC), was an ally of Dr. Martin Luther King Jr., and organized voter registration drives. The Clarence Henry Truckway in the Port of New Orleans is named in Henry's honor.

== Early life ==
Henry was born on January 7, 1910, in New Orleans, Louisiana. Henry attended the Marigny school in New Orleans. In 1928, at the age of 17, Henry put aside his shoe-shine stand and began working on the New Orleans waterfront as a dock worker and longshoreman. Henry's first job on the docks was as a tow-motor operator in the Port of Embarkation. Henry worked on the waterfront for the next 20 years in a variety of roles, and was said to have performed every job connected with longshoring except operating a winch. Henry showed strong leadership skills, and his fellow workers referred to him as the "little man with the big voice." The Louisiana Weekly later wrote, "[Henry] did not have the remotest dream that he would leave an incredible mark on riverfront history of the Port of New Orleans. Yet, this was his destiny."

== President of Local 1419 ==
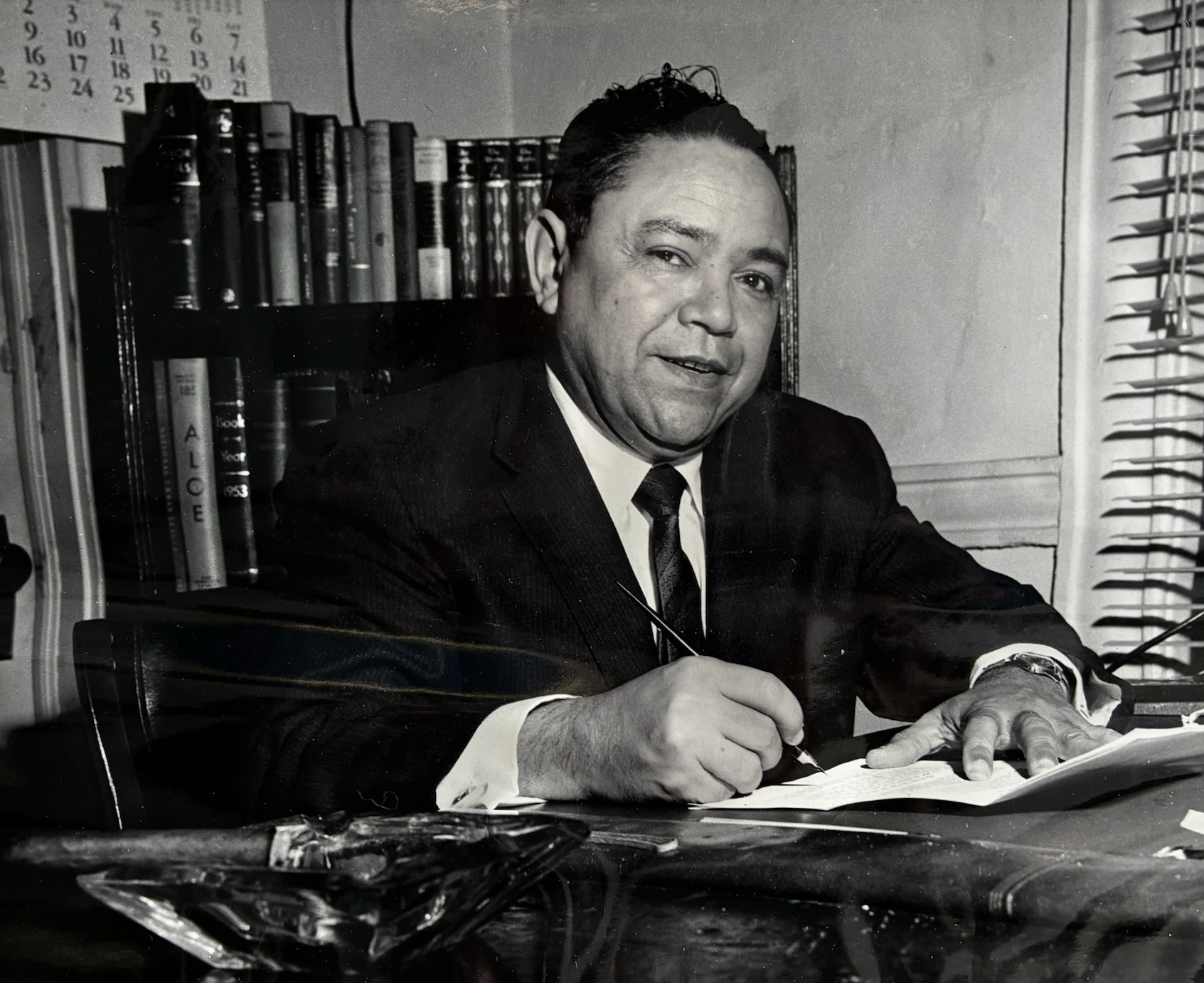

In 1948, Henry first became a union officer when he was appointed as Chairman of Percentage in Local 1419, the ILA chapter representing black dockworkers in New Orleans. Local 1419 was the world's largest black union. Separate white and black longshoremen unions existed in New Orleans until 1980, when Local 1419 merged with the white Local 1418 to create the integrated Local 3000. In 1954, Henry, then serving as Executive Vice President, was elected President of Local 1419, winning by a large margin with 1,861 of the 2,761 votes cast. In a victory statement, Henry said, "I want to especially thank the men who worked in [sic] my behalf and voted for me. I realize that they have elected me to a responsible position and I will do everything within my power to live up to those expectations." Before Henry took office, Local 1419 was considered to be in turmoil, with significant financial trouble and loss of respect from the community, a time largely considered the darkest period of the organization's history. At the time, Henry was the only black American to head a multi-million dollar fund due to his position as Chairman of the Board of Trustees of the ILA Pension. Over time, most of Henry's opponents later became his biggest supporters. Henry's campaign manager, who at one time opposed Henry, said he was convinced Henry did more for Local 1419 than any other man in the union's history. Henry continued to be re-elected as the President of Local 1419, serving in that role until his death in 1974.

=== Accomplishments ===
Henry was described as a "low-key leader," but "had the ability to rise to any challenge." Henry was very active in the New Orleans community and civil rights. Henry told the audience in a victory speech that "we must encourage everyone to become a registered voter so that we will be in a position to elect friends of organized labor," emphasizing his focus on black voting rights. Henry fought for safer working conditions, better housing, better education, and better flood protection from hurricanes for black families. In 1972, Henry, along with other ILA officials in New Orleans, protested the racist government policies in Rhodesia, having members of the union refuse to offload 25,000 tons of Rhodesian chrome ore.

Because of Henry's efforts, the Louisiana Division of Employment Security changed their policies to allow more longshoremen to qualify for social security benefits. In 1972, a contract was signed by Henry which ensured no longshoreman would earn less than $1,500 per year. At the time, this was described as the best three-year contract in New Orleans' history. Henry was incredibly valuable because of his negotiation skills. Local 1419 was described as the greatest source of strength in fights with the AFL as it maintained the fattest treasury and most members in the ILA. In 1950, Henry, along with other labor leaders and the Mayor of New Orleans, met with President Harry S. Truman, top Army officials, and members of Congress to attempt to prevent the closing of the New Orleans Port of Embarkation.

=== Building the new union hall ===
In 1959, Henry dedicated a new $500,000 union hall, which began and was completed during Henry's administration. The union hall's mortgage was historically paid off in full in less than ten years. The union hall became a landmark of New Orleans and a place of gathering for the black community with shops, meetings, and community events. Henry later hosted a ball for high school graduates and made YMCA programs more accessible to young people by providing them with the hall's auditorium.

=== Awards and recognition ===
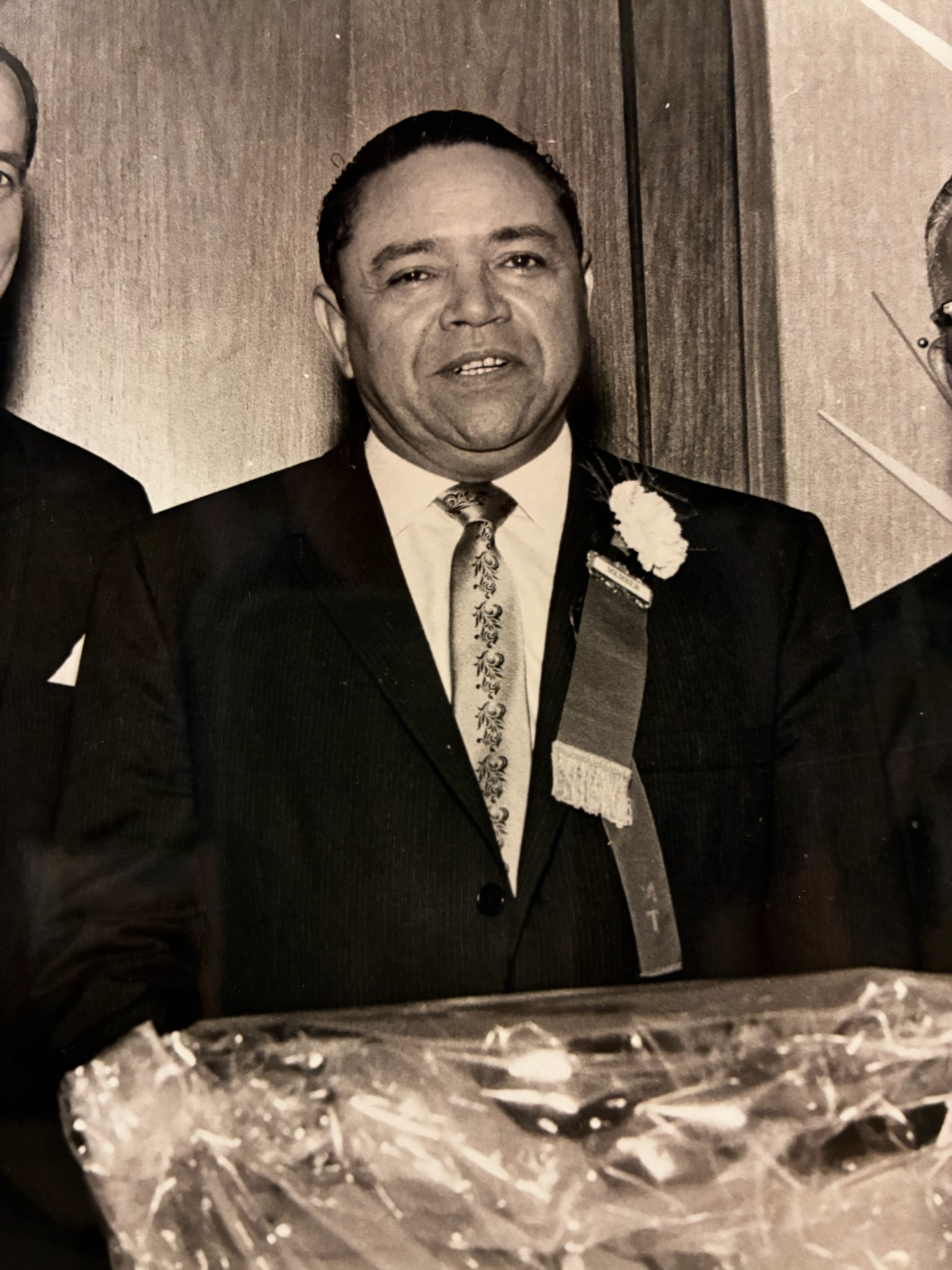

In honor of his work towards the advancement of the union and the community, officers and members of Local 1419 hosted an appreciation dinner for Henry in 1960, citing his efforts in advancing pensions, welfare, and vacation funds. The banquet honored Henry as a "stalwart leader in our community, humanitarian and builder of good will," and Henry received an award of merit for his "unselfish interest and untiring service to the laboring class of the New Orleans Community" by the New Orleans City Hall custodial workers. In 1968, the National Student Association cited Henry in recognition of his outstanding leadership in the fields of labor, management, politics, and civic endeavors. Henry was presented a plaque for being "an outstanding Negro leader who has made many important contributions toward the advancement of better race relations in the City of New Orleans and in the nation." In 1973, Henry received the Louisiana AFL-CIO's Award of Excellence.

== Civil rights ==
Henry was an active Life Member of the NAACP. Henry was appointed Co-Director of the NAACP Spring Membership Campaign of 1966, worked to increase membership of the New Orleans Branch NAACP, and spoke at multiple NAACP events. Henry actively fought against police brutality and legislation promoting segregation in Louisiana universities. Henry improved Welfare and Race relations through his position as the Executive Board of Total Community Action and Louisiana State Commission on Human Relations. Henry also served as a member of the Executive Board of the SCLC since its founding and on the Advisory Committee of the YMCA.

=== Voting rights ===
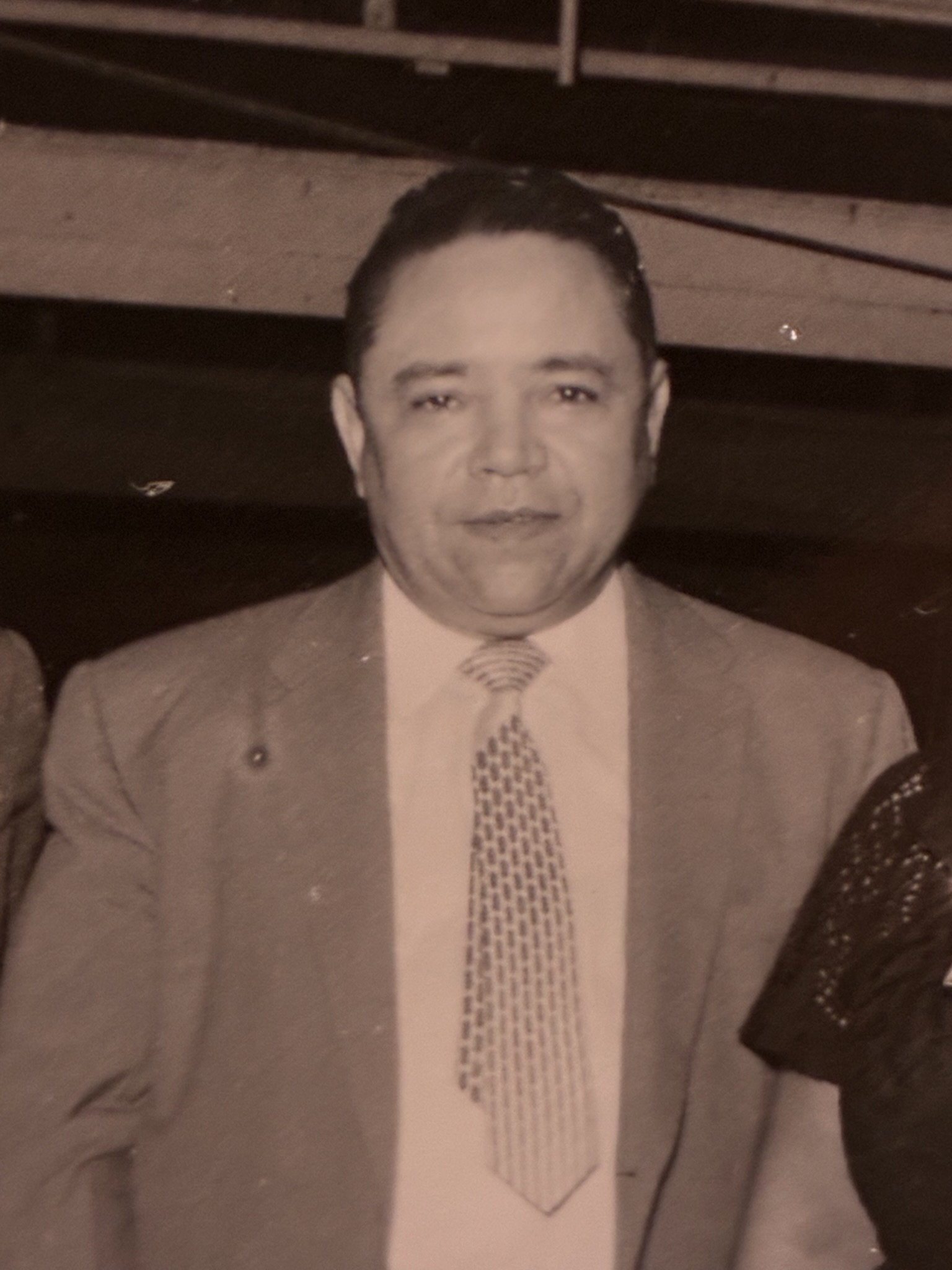

Henry actively fought against voter registration discrimination to ensure black Americans had the right to vote. Henry stated that black teachers and professionals were "turned away and told they had not properly filled out application forms." Louisiana voter application and literacy tests were used before the passage of the Voting Rights Act to deny black people the right to vote. Under Henry's leadership, Local 1419 conducted voter registration schools. In 1954, Henry led a newly-formed unit for an intensified registration drive in New Orleans after meeting with Illinois Congressmen and political leaders to map out plans to increase black voter registration. In 1955, Henry, along with three other ILA locals, set up an office to teach how to become registered voters, qualify for voter registration, and work towards repealing the "right to work" bill. Henry, through Local 1419, sponsored a 13-week radio series, which won top honors, with the goal of registering 75,000 black voters in New Orleans and 200,000 in Louisiana. The Louisiana Weekly credited the jump in black voter registration to Henry's radio series and ILA registration school. The Crescent City Independent Voters League, of which Henry was President, provided sample registration blanks and literature.

Henry believed in the power of the ballot. Henry stated the Emmett Till murder trial was the "end result [which] shows how important a weapon the ballot can be" because black people were not able to be on the grand jury. Henry believed "it will be through this means that we will cross the threshold into first-class citizenship," continuously reminding black Americans of the need of increasing balloting strength to fight for equality. Henry said that "No stated policy of true Democracy can make itself invincible on the world scene unless it is used and made workable in the personal lives of every inhabitant of the United States, regardless of race, creed, or color."

In 1961, Henry provided space for voter registration in the union hall without cost and donated more than 20,000 sample registration application forms. After a successful voter registration campaign, there were thousands of black people who had no experience with voting machines. Therefore, in 1965, Henry secured several voting machines and qualified instructors, which allowed for thousands of newly registered voters to receive instructions for their use before the Democratic Primary election.

=== Work with Dr. Martin Luther King Jr. ===
Dr. Martin Luther King Jr. stated on multiple occasions that Henry was one of his most dependable aids, citing his gracious contributions of time and funds to the SCLC. In 1957, Henry worked with King to organize the SCLC of New Orleans. In late January 1957, two weeks before King met with a group of black leaders in New Orleans to establish the SCLC, King met with Henry in New Orleans and spoke at the Local 1419 Union Hall. King was known to have slept on a sofa in Henry's office at the union hall.

Many attempts were made on Henry's life due to his work with King, including two attempts to force Henry's car off the highway in Alabama when returning from a meeting in Mississippi with King. In 1960, King presented Henry an award for his unselfish devotion to freedom and human dignity. In 1961, King presented Henry a plaque for his efforts in keeping the ILA Registration School active for eight years, civil rights efforts, calling the Federal Government's attention to 22,000 children cut off from welfare assistance, calling together a committee to secure jobs for black people, and donating office space to the Coordinating Council's voter registration school. Henry led the New Orleans delegation for the 1963 March on Washington and arranged a bus to transport activists for the event.

After King's assassination in 1968, Henry led a movement for labor unions across the country to cease work in his honor, working all night to prepare leaflets to be distributed to workers across the New Orleans waterfront and coordinating with the ILA International President in New York to issue a cessation of work order to all ILA locals. Henry said, "As president of Local 1419, I join with each and every waterfront worker in deploring the brutal assassination Thursday night of Dr. Martin Luther King in Memphis, Tenn. This act was intended to cripple the movement for achieving full citizenship for all men in America. But the incorrectness of such reasoning is obvious." Henry also successfully negotiated a contract to give longshoremen a holiday on King's birthday. Henry attended King's rites, marching in a five-mile procession during the funeral on April 9, 1968.

=== 1968 Democratic National Convention ===
Henry served as one of Louisiana's delegates at the Democratic National Convention in 1968, one of five of the first black delegates to represent the state. Henry and the other four delegates protested what they described as "token" representation. In a meeting of the black delegates, called by Henry in his offices, Henry discussed the composition of the Louisiana delegation, stating the black delegates were only allotted three and a half of 36 votes, despite 20% of the registered Democrats in Louisiana being black, meaning seven of the delegation's 36 members should have been black.

== Marriage and family ==
Clarence Henry was first married to Elizabeth Henry, with whom he had seven children. He then married Doris Henry, with whom he had two children. After Clarence Henry's death, Doris Henry was elected as an at-large delegate to the Louisiana Democratic National party's mini convention in 1974.

== Death and funeral ==
Henry died at the age of 64 on May 1, 1974. Thousands gathered at the ILA Auditorium and proceeded to the St. Louis Cathedral to pay tribute to Henry. Henry was President of Local 1419 for 20 years at the time of his death. He was buried at the Metairie Cemetery.

=== Cause of death ===
According to a suit filed with the Civil District Court, an operation was performed on Henry on April 19, 1974. Henry showed good progress after the surgery but he swiftly deteriorated. Medical staff left a large lap square with a metal ring and tab in Henry's abdomen, which was located by an x-ray nine days later and caused his death. Another operation was conducted to remove the item, but Henry died of peritonitis on May 1, 1974. The family of Henry filed a $7.5 million malpractice suit against the Touro Infirmary and three doctors, two of which recommended a surgery and another of which performed the surgery. The Touro Infirmary would not provide a cause of death. In spite of the death of Henry, the doctors still charged over $10,000 for their services, according to the suit.

== Legacy ==
In 1975, after Henry's death, Local 1419 negotiated to have January 7, Henry's birthday, as a paid holiday. An additional special memorial mass was also held on January 7, 1975 in Henry's honor, which was widely attended by members of the ILA, pensioners, the New Orleans Steamship Association, friends, and relatives. On March 20, 1975, the Louisiana AFL-CIO held a special memorial service in the Grand Ballroom of the Capitol House Hotel, which included speeches by the Governor and congressmen, among others. In 1974, a local legislator proposed a bill to change the name of Tchoupitoulas Street, whose path parallels many wharf sites, to Clarence "Chink" Henry Avenue. However, after outcry against changing the historic name of the street, the Clarence Henry Truckway, a four-mile road along the Mississippi River, was instead named in his honor. Henry was also named to the Louisiana AFL-CIO Hall of Fame on March 5, 2018.

== Memberships ==
Henry served on the Board of Commissioners of the Louisiana Stadium and Exposition District and was the only black member of the Superdome Commission. Citing the lack of significant black contracts, Henry vehemently stated, "I want some black participation in this stadium." Subsequently, a commission began to involve black investors in contracts related to the stadium's operations. This led to the commission members negotiating with a mostly-black firm for janitorial, security, and labor services in March 1974.

Henry was also an Officer of the Kennedy-Johnson Voters League in 1960 and opened a Johnson-Humphrey campaign office in the ILA building in 1964. Henry, as President of the Crescent City Voters League, sponsored the nation-wide "Get the Vote for Humphrey" campaign in New Orleans in 1968.

Henry served on many boards and commissions in New Orleans and Louisiana. Henry was President of Local 1419 ILA; International Vice President of the ILA; Executive Board Member of the ILA Pension, Welfare, Vacation, and Holiday Fund; Executive Board Member of the Greater New Orleans AFL-CIO; Assistant to the President of the Louisiana State AFL-CIO; Executive Board Member of the South Atlantic and Gulf Coast District ILA; and Executive Board Member of the Maritime Trades Department.

Henry served as an Executive Board Member of the AFL-CIO Committee on Political Education, SCLC, Total Community Action, and YMCA Advisory Committee. Henry was a member of the Summit Conference of Negro Leadership. Henry was a member of the Frontiers International, the Original Illinois Club, and reached the 33rd degree in Prince Hall Masonry, which is the highest achievable honorary rank in the Scottish Rite of Freemasonry.
