= Scottish Rite Cathedral (Shreveport, Louisiana) =

- U.S. National Register of Historic Places
- U.S. Historic district – Contributing property
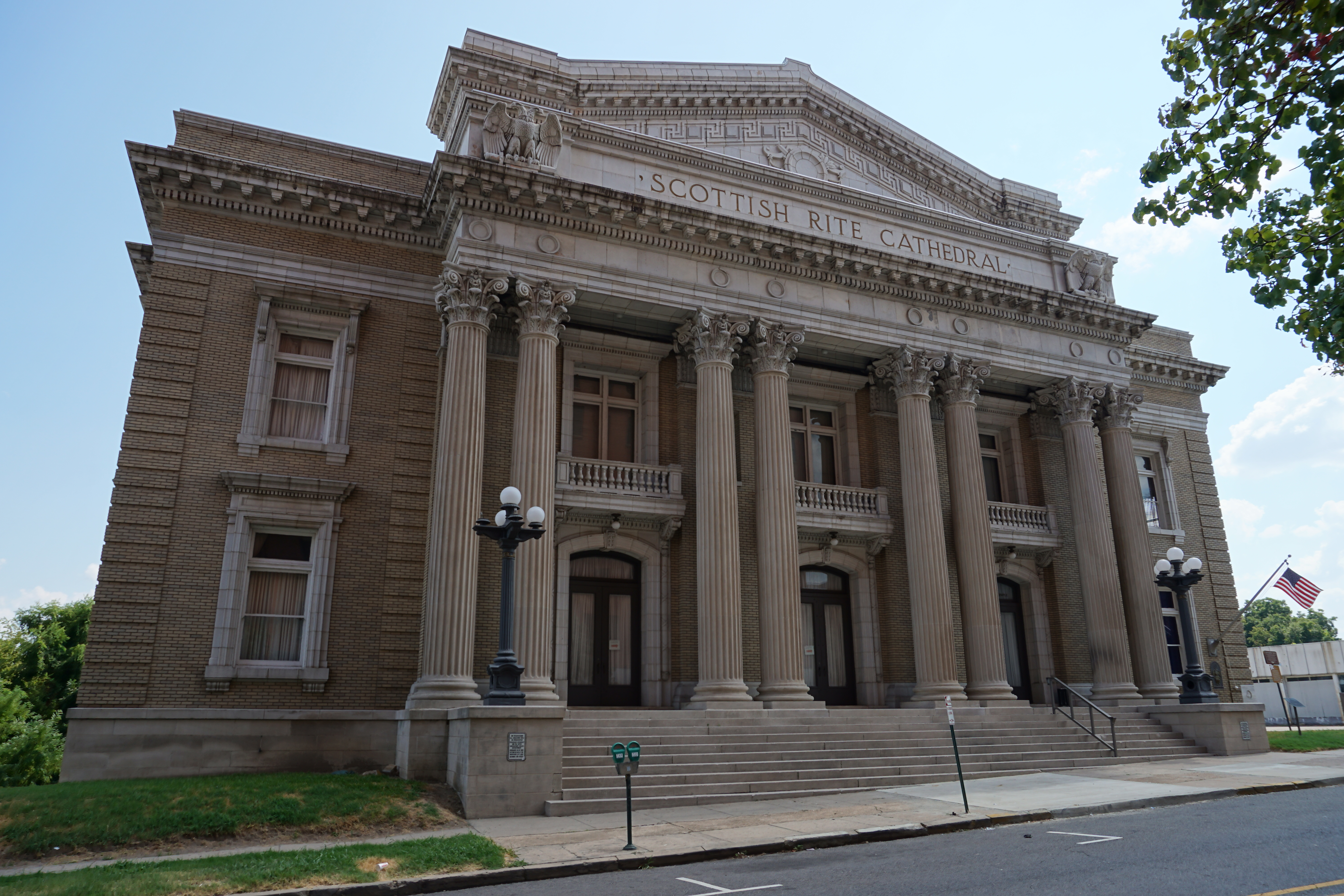

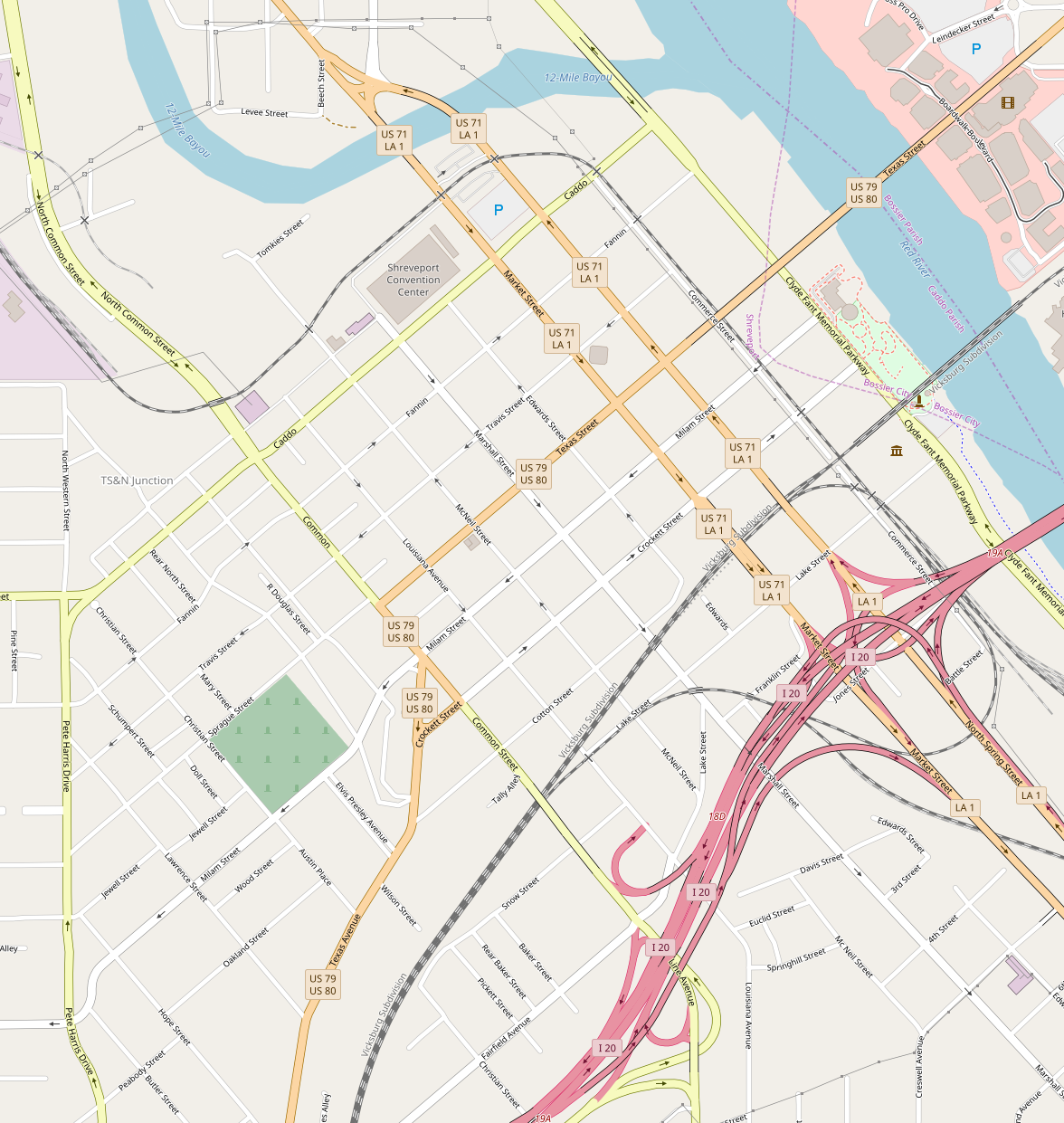
- Location within Shreveport Downtown
- Location: 725 Cotton Street, Shreveport, Louisiana
- Coordinates: 32°30′30″N 93°44′59″W
- Area: 0.75 acres (0.30 ha)
- Built: 1915
- Architect: Edward F. Neild
- Architectural style: Beaux Arts
- Part of: Shreveport Commercial Historic District (ID82002760)
- NRHP reference No.: 86003132

Significant dates
- Added to NRHP: 06 November 1986
- Designated CP: 16 May, 1997

The Scottish Rite Cathedral is a historic building located at 725 Cotton Street in Shreveport, Louisiana. It was designed in 1915 by architect Edward F. Neild in Beaux Arts style.

The building was listed on the National Register of Historic Places in 1986. It also became a contributing property of Shreveport Commercial Historic District when its boundaries were increased on 16 May 1997.

The Cathedral was completed on 1 July 1917. The grand opening ceremony was held on Monday, 12 November, 1917, amid great fanfare and local interest. As part of the dedication ceremonies, the masons and their wives were treated to two organ recitals, one at 3:30 PM and the other at 8:00 PM. The guest organist was John Allen Richardson, organist and choirmaster of the St. Paul's Episcopal Church of Chicago, Illinois. Following the second recital, a dance was held with music provided by the Shriner's El Karubah Band and Orchestra.

Edward F. Neild, a member of the Shreveport Scottish Rite, was the architect of the Scottish Rite Cathedral. Among Mr. Neild's many other achievements were his architectural contributions to the renovation of our nation's capital in Washington, D.C, the White House, and the Truman Memorial Library and Museum in Independence, Missouri. In addition, he is credited with the design of the Shriner's Hospital for Crippled Children, also in Shreveport, and the first of its kind in North America.

The building measures 133'1" by 110'5," and the final cost to construct the building in 1917 was $186,477.28.

The Shreveport Scottish Rite Cathedral is a historic building in the Shreveport area. It includes a three level auditorium with a seating capacity of five hundred, a wardrobe room, a marble lobby, a pair of matching marble staircases, a kitchen, a banquet hall, a masonic library, numerous offices, a DeMolay room, a basement, and a section where children receive help through a Speech and Language Clinic Charity.

== See also ==
- National Register of Historic Places listings in Caddo Parish, Louisiana
