= Hughes House (Benton, Louisiana) =

Historic house in Louisiana, United States

- U.S. National Register of Historic Places
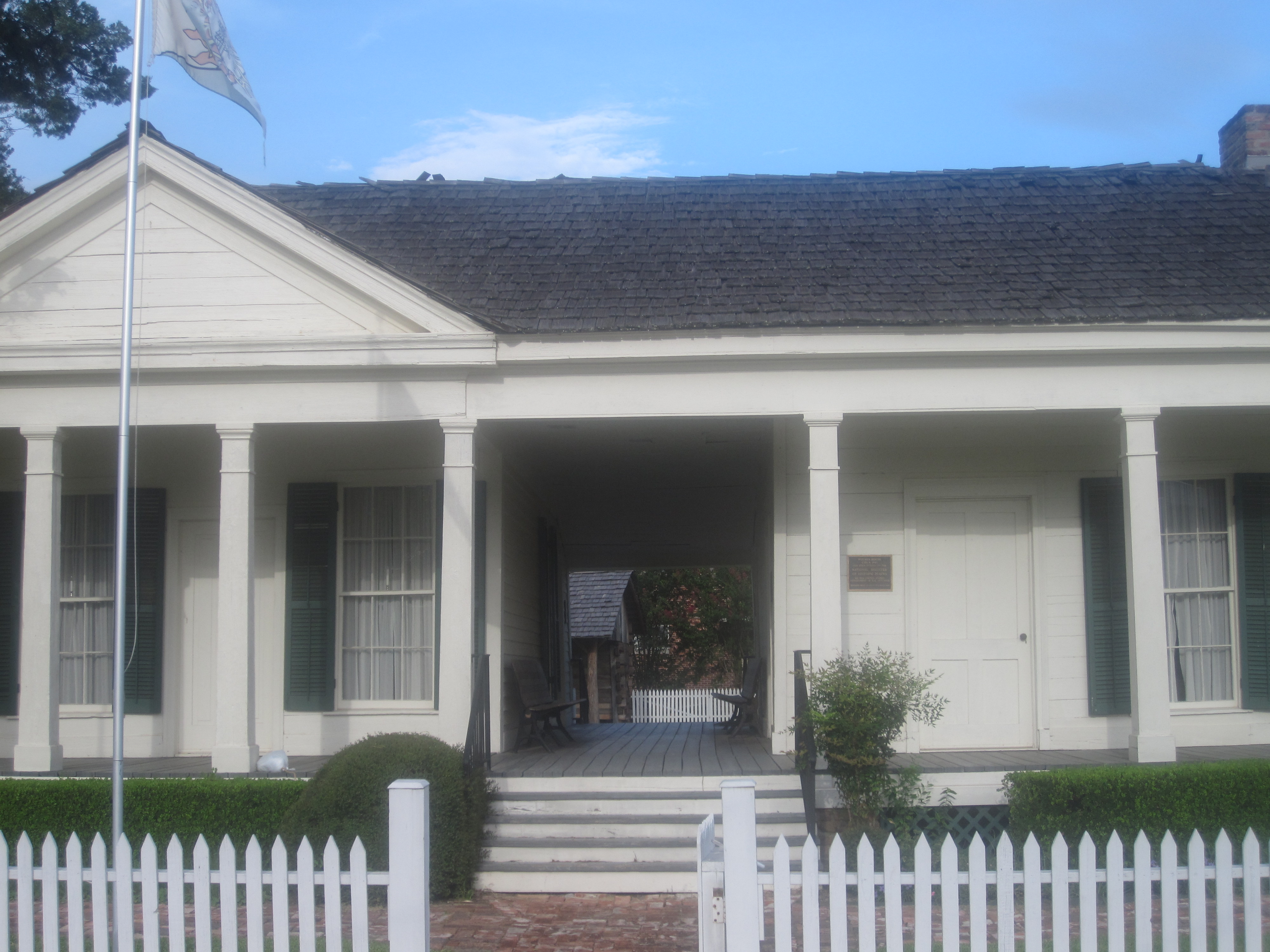

- Location within Louisiana
- Location: 414 Sibley Street, Benton, Louisiana
- Coordinates: 32°41′39″N 93°44′23″W
- Area: less than one acre
- Built: c.1840
- Architectural style: Greek Revival
- NRHP reference No.: 96001163
- Added to NRHP: October 22, 1996

The Hughes House at 414 Sibley Street in Benton in Bossier Parish in northwestern Louisiana, was built in about 1840. It was listed on the National Register of Historic Places in 1996.

The house was originally listed on the National Register in 1976 at its original location on LA 160, 13 miles (21 km) northeast of Benton (NRHP ref #76000962). It was delisted in September 1996, and re-enlisted with actual reference number after its move in October 1996.

== See also ==
- National Register of Historic Places listings in Bossier Parish, Louisiana
