= History of Louisiana Tech University =

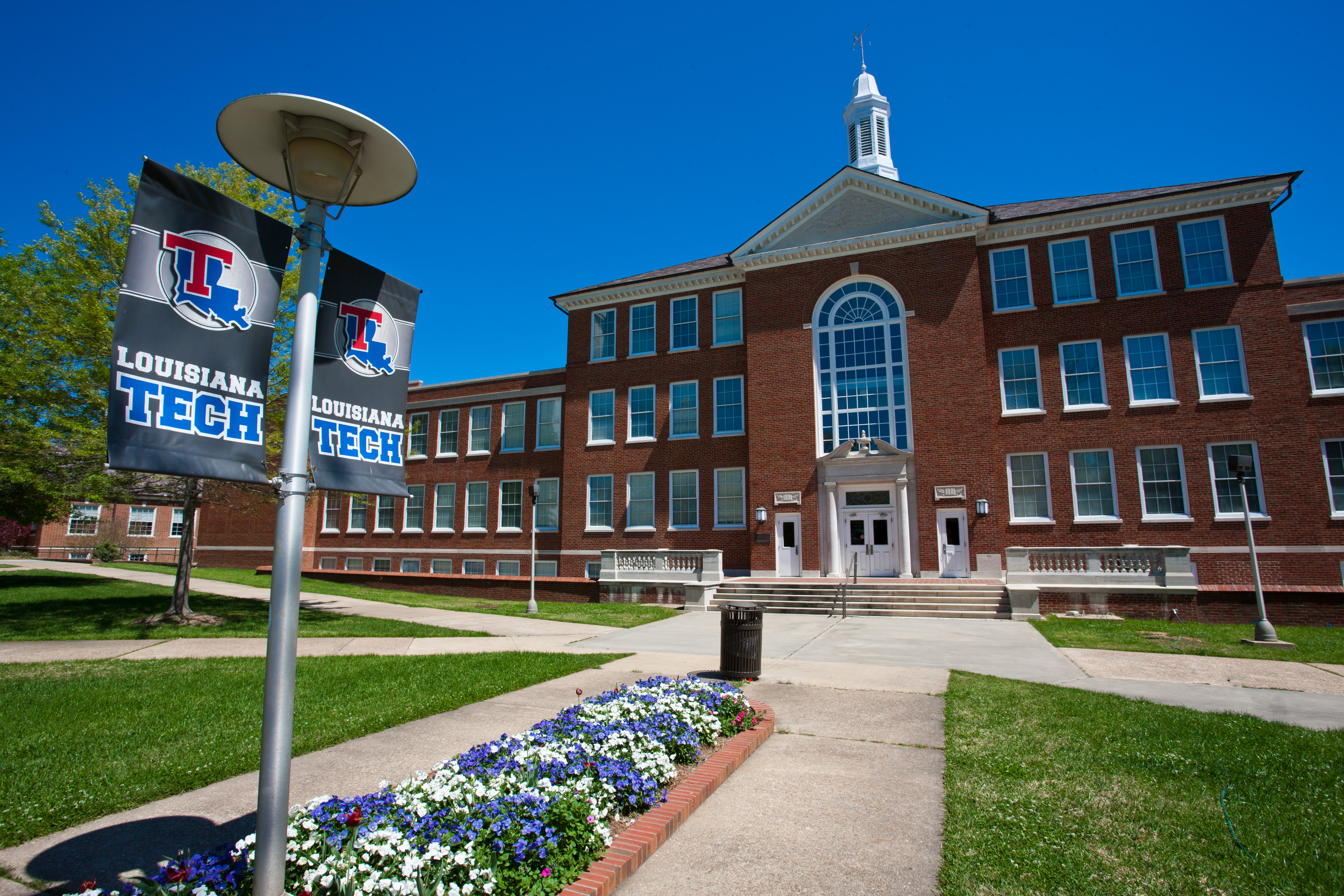
Keeny Hall constructed in 1936-1937 to replace the Old Main Building that had burned down in early 1936.

The History of Louisiana Tech University began when the Industrial Institute and College of Louisiana was founded in Ruston, Louisiana in 1894. The institute was founded to develop an industrial economy in the state of Louisiana. Four years later, the school was renamed the Louisiana Industrial Institute when Louisiana adopted the Constitution of 1898. When the Constitution of 1921 was passed, the school changed its name again to Louisiana Polytechnic Institute to reflect the school's evolution from a trade school into a larger and broader technical institute. Although the university was informally called Louisiana Tech for about five decades after the 1921 name change, it was not until 1970 when Louisiana Polytechnic Institute officially changed its name to Louisiana Tech University. Over the course of its history, the school grew from a small industrial institute with one building to a university with five colleges and an enrollment of around 11,800 students.

== Establishment of the University ==
After the end of Reconstruction in Louisiana in 1877, the only two notable universities in the state were Tulane University and Louisiana State University (LSU). A few small colleges populated the rural areas of north Louisiana, such as Mount Lebanon University in Mount Lebanon, Keatchie Female College in Keachi, and Ruston College. The Louisiana state government began to support the creation of higher education colleges and universities across the state including the establishment of Southern University in 1880 and Louisiana State Normal School in 1884.

On May 14, 1894, one year after a fire destroyed the old Ruston College, the Lincoln Parish Police Jury held a special session to outline plans to establish an industrial institute for Lincoln Parish and to introduce the plans during the upcoming session of the Louisiana State Legislature. The police jury decided at the meeting to move forward with the plans and called upon the local State Representative George M. Lomax to introduce the legislation during the next session. During the legislative session, State Representatives Lomax and J. T. M. Hancock from Jackson Parish, and lawyer and future judge John B. Holstead fought for the passage of the proposed bill. On July 6, 1894, the legislature passed the bill as Act 68 of the General Assembly of Louisiana. The act established The Industrial Institute and College of Louisiana to be located in Ruston, LA. The institute was established "for the education of the white children of the State of Louisiana in the arts and sciences". The original skills to be taught at the industrial institute included telegraphy, stenography, drawing, industrial applications of designing and engraving, needlework, and bookkeeping. Because the school was the only state college north of Natchitoches, admission standards were lenient. Students who were admitted into the general preparatory class were required to be fourteen years of age and to be able to read, write, speak and spell with "tolerable correctness."

The Industrial Institute and College of Louisiana named Colonel Arthur T. Prescott as the institute's first president in 1894. Colonel Prescott, the former commandant of the student cadet organization at the University of Virginia, moved to Ruston to oversee the establishment of the industrial institute in Ruston. After the school secured $20,000 from the Louisiana Legislature, Lincoln Parish, and the City of Ruston and twenty acres of land through a donation by Francis P. Stubbs, Prescott led the school's efforts to construct the first buildings on the Tech campus. The first building constructed on the Tech Campus, The Old Main Building, was a two-story brick building that contained eight large classrooms, an auditorium, chemical laboratory, and two offices. Prescott also set aside a reading room in the Old Main Building furnished with tables, chairs, and 125 books donated from his own personal collection to serve as the school's first library A frame building was also built near the Old Main Building to be used for the instruction of mechanics. In 1898, Hale Hall was constructed as a two-story girls dormitory.

During Colonel Prescott's five years at the institute, the school's student enrollment grew and the first diplomas were awarded. On September 23, 1895, the school held its first classes with six faculty members and 212 students from 22 parishes. Although there were no classes offered for music studies at first, student demand led to the administration offering courses in piano, voice, and violin. For the 1897–1898 academic year, the student enrollment grew to 300 students while the faculty expanded to 12 teachers. In the spring of 1897, Colonel Prescott awarded the school's degree to Harry Howard. Harry Howard received a Bachelor of Industry degree after two years of study. Mr. Howard would become an instructor at the college as well as the College Treasurer and the Director of the Business Department for over 25 years. The first graduation ceremony was held in 1898 when ten graduates received their diplomas at the Ruston Opera House.

== Louisiana Industrial Institute (1898–1921) ==
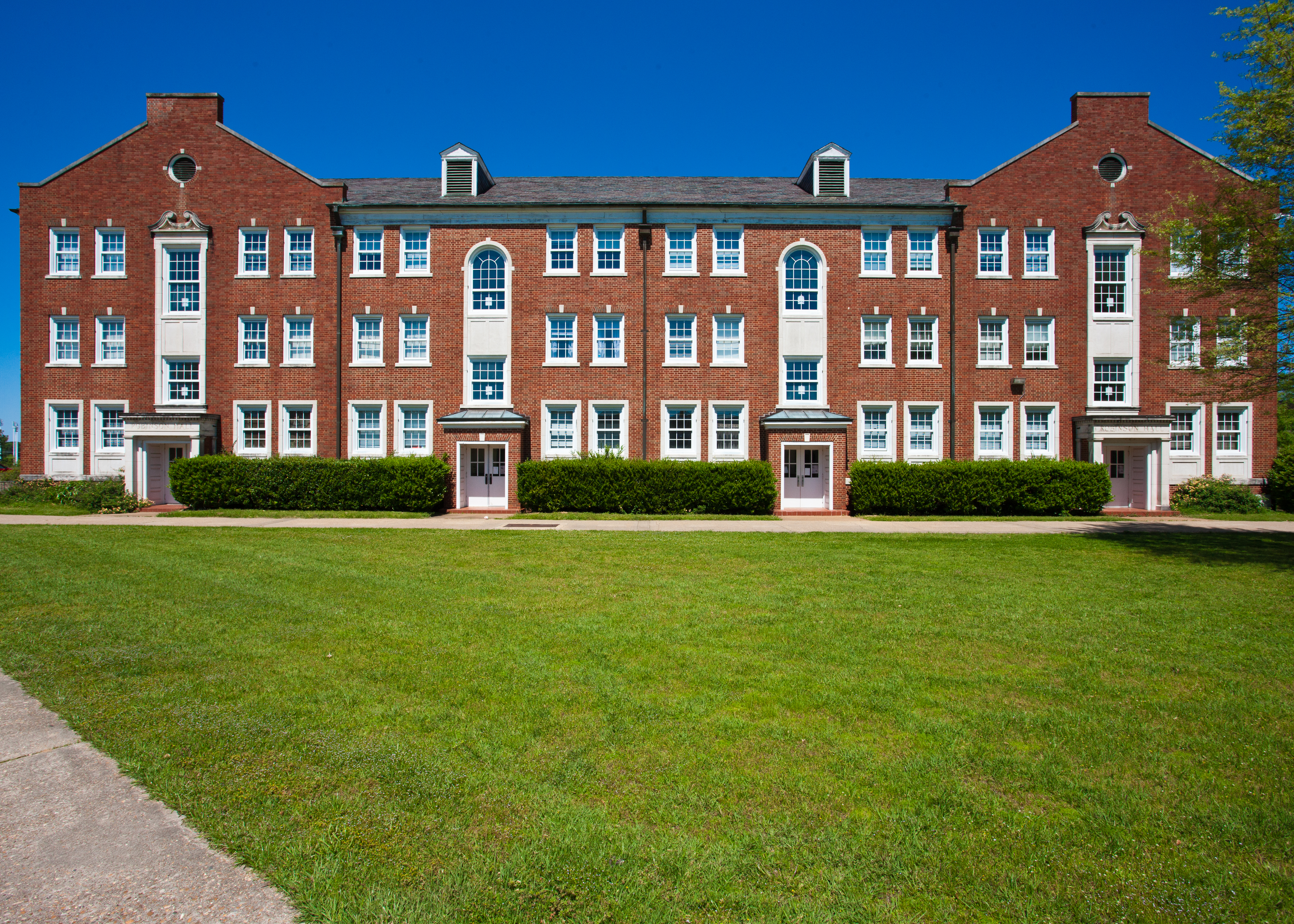
Robinson Hall - Named in honor of W.C. Robinson who was a professor of mathematics and for a short time the second president of Louisiana Tech University ( though named Louisiana Industrial Institute at the time.)

In 1898, the state of Louisiana passed the Constitution of 1898. Article 256 of the new constitution changed the name of the school from "The Industrial Institute and College of Louisiana" to the Louisiana Industrial Institute. The following year, Colonel Prescott resigned as the institute's president to return to his alma mater, LSU, where he became a professor of government and the first head of the Government Department. W. C. Robinson, one of the original faculty members in 1894 and a professor of mathematics, succeeded Prescott as President of the Louisiana Industrial Institute in 1899.

The Louisiana Industrial Institute suffered in its early years as a result of politics and inadequate financial support from the state government. Although the student enrollment and faculty grew through the first decade of the 1900s, the Louisiana Industrial Institute had frequent changes in its faculty and presidents as a result of low salaries and the state's inadequate support of the school. From 1899 to 1907, the institute installed four presidents. Of the four presidents during the eight-year period, only one, James B. Aswell, served longer than two years.

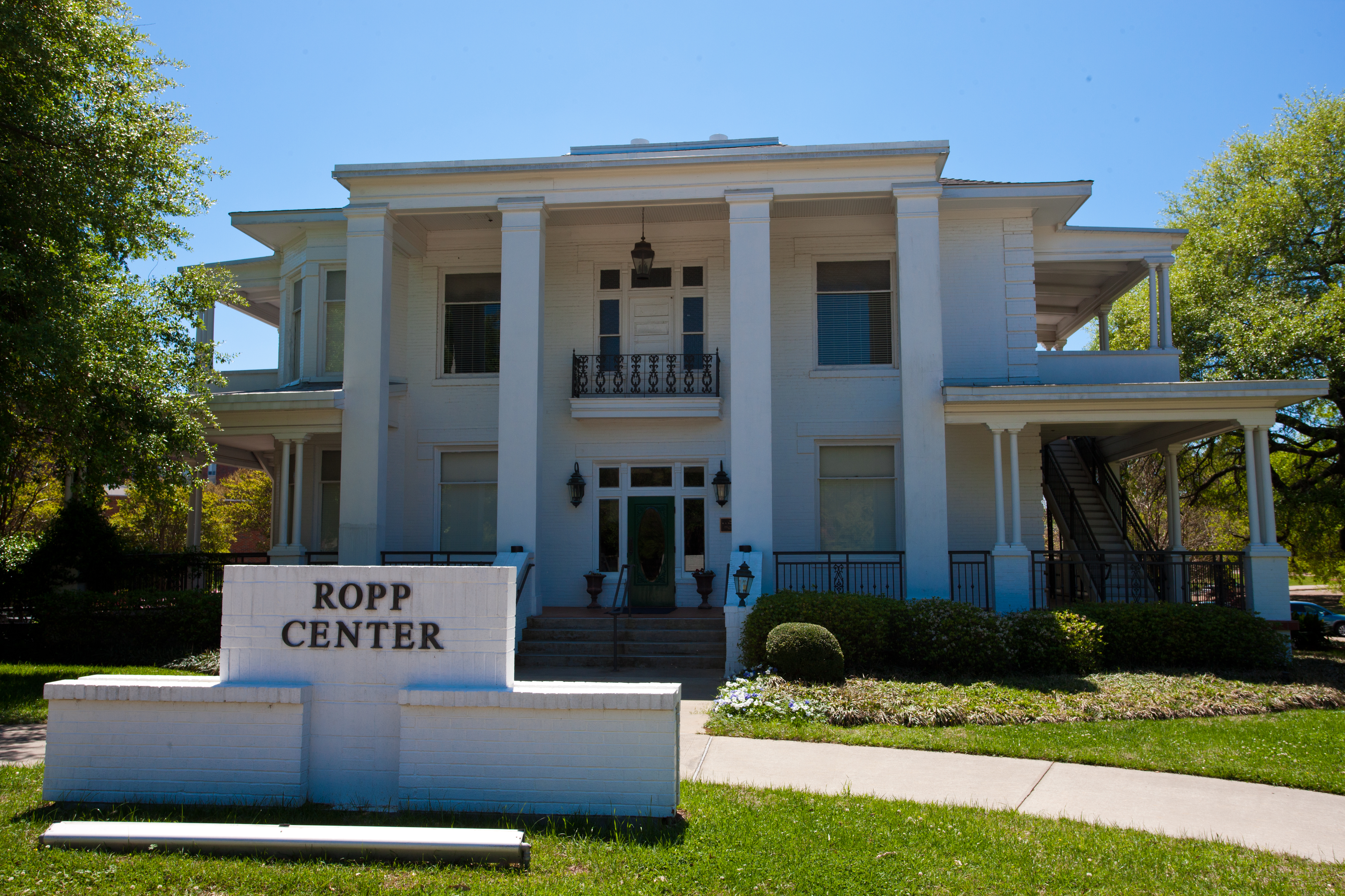
The Ropp Center - Named after president Ralph L. Ropp and constructed in 1911, it is the oldest existing structure on campus.

In 1900, the Louisiana Industrial Institute reorganized the academic studies curriculum into two years of preparatory work and three years of college level courses. Students could select the general business course, the mechanical course, or the domestic science course after they completed the two years of preparatory studies. High school graduates were admitted into the third year of studies (first college level year) without examination. By 1905, the minimum age for admission was raised for incoming students. Young ladies had to be at least fifteen years old to enter the First Year. Young men had to be at least sixteen years old to enter the First Year, fifteen years old to enter the Second Year, and fourteen years old to enter the Third Year. By 1909, all young men had to be at least sixteen years old to gain admission to the institute.

Student life continued to develop at the school as the student enrollment expanded to over 800 students in the 1904–1905 school year. About 250 female students lived at the Hale Hall Girls' Dormitory while 125 male students lived at the Boys' Hall. Four literary societies were organized by the higher classes as part of their English studies. The Young Men's Christian Association and the King's Daughters were the two Christian organizations on the campus at that time. The students and faculty assembled at the chapel before the start of each school day for Bible reading, prayer, and singing. Every student was required to attend the Sunday service at the church of their choice and encouraged to attend one of the Sunday School services conducted by the institute's faculty members at one of the local churches. The school also maintained football and baseball teams on the newly purchased athletic field. In 1905, the first edition of The Lagniappe, the school's yearbook, was published.

The Mechanic Arts Building was constructed in 1904 following a rapid period of growth of the Mechanical Arts Department. The building would house the Mechanical Arts Department and the School of Engineering until the erection of Bogard Hall in 1940. The Ropp Center, the original President's home, named for president Ralph L. Ropp and the oldest existing structure on the campus, was constructed in 1911. The Italian-style, wood-frame building was the home of Louisiana Tech's presidents for nearly sixty years.

Starting in the late 1910s, the Louisiana Industrial Institute started to reorganize some of the degree programs, including engineering. As a result of the changes, bachelor's degrees were offered in the fields of engineering, business administration, education, and home economics. In 1919, the trustees enlarged the curricula and started granting a standard baccalaureate degree. On June 15, 1921, the first bachelor's degree, the Bachelor of Industry in General Engineering, was awarded to a graduate.

== Change to the Louisiana Polytechnic Institute (1921) ==
- Bogard Hall, Louisiana Tech University
- U.S. National Register of Historic Places
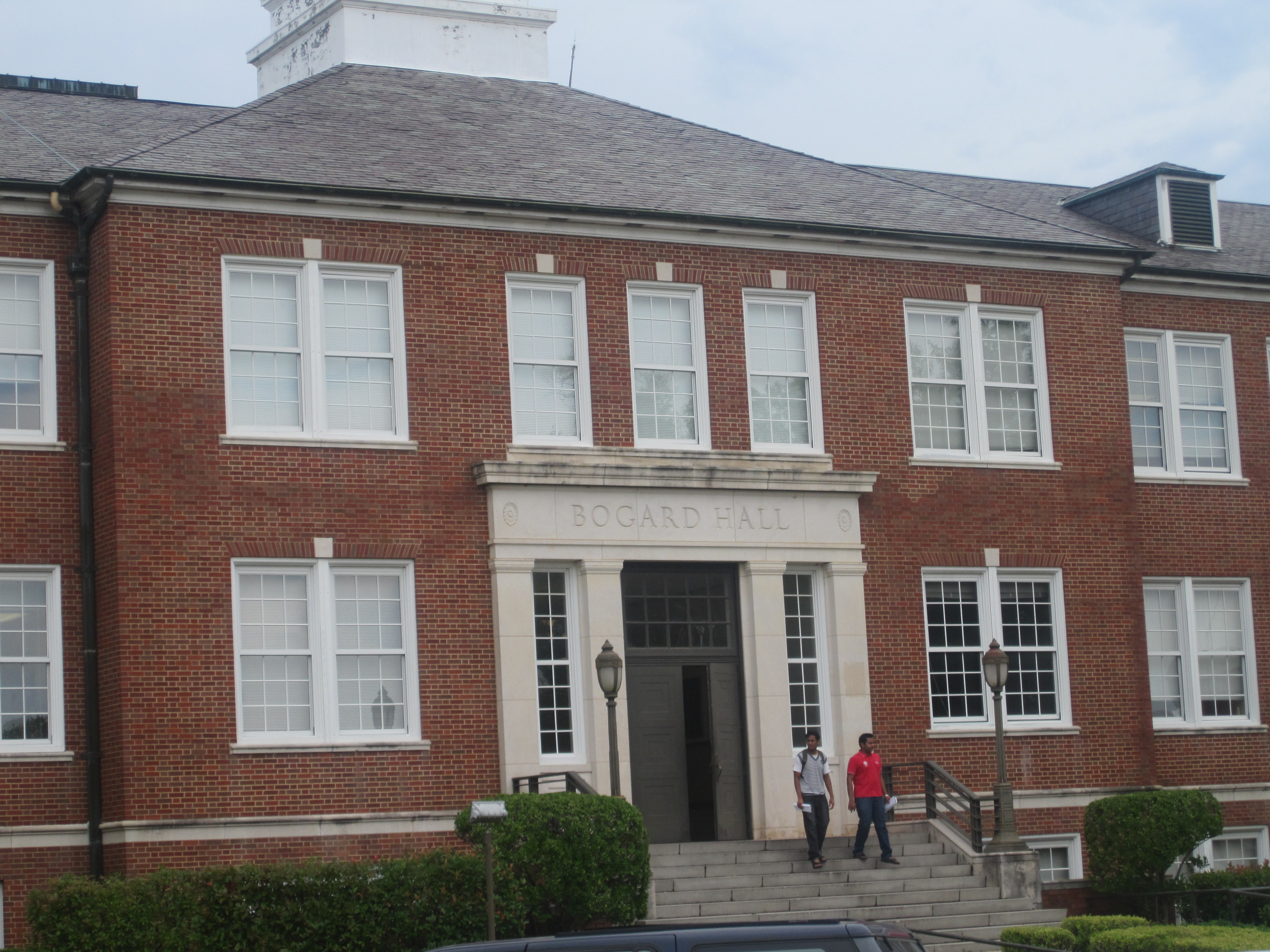
- Location: 600 Dan Reneau Drive, Ruston, Louisiana
- Coordinates: 32°31′35″N 92°38′45″W
- Area: 4 acres (1.6 ha)
- Built: 1939
- Built by: T.L. James
- Architect: Neild, Somdal & Neild
- Architectural style: Colonial Revival
- MPS: The 1930s Building Boom at Louisiana Tech MRA
- NRHP reference No.: 98000119
- Added to NRHP: February 20, 1998

- Howard Auditorium, Louisiana Tech University
- U.S. National Register of Historic Places
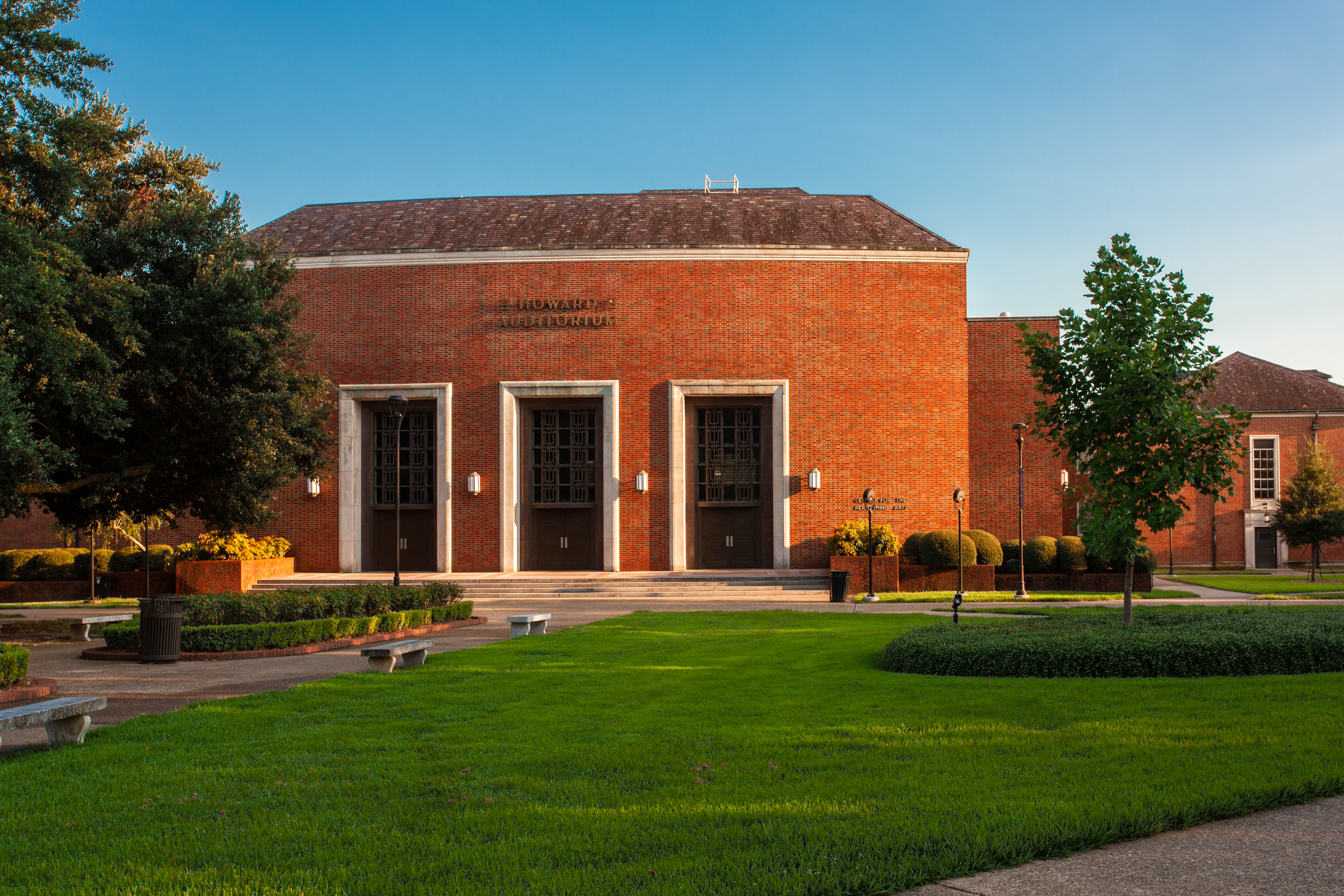
- Location: Corner of Adams Boulevard and Dan Reneau Drive, Ruston, Louisiana
- Coordinates: 32°31′36″N 92°38′49″W
- Area: 4 acres (1.6 ha)
- Built: 1939-40
- Built by: Nathan Wohlfeld
- Architect: Neild, Somdal & Neild
- Architectural style: Moderne
- MPS: The 1930s Building Boom at Louisiana Tech MRA
- NRHP reference No.: 98000113
- Added to NRHP: February 20, 1998

- Keeny Hall, Louisiana Tech University
- U.S. National Register of Historic Places
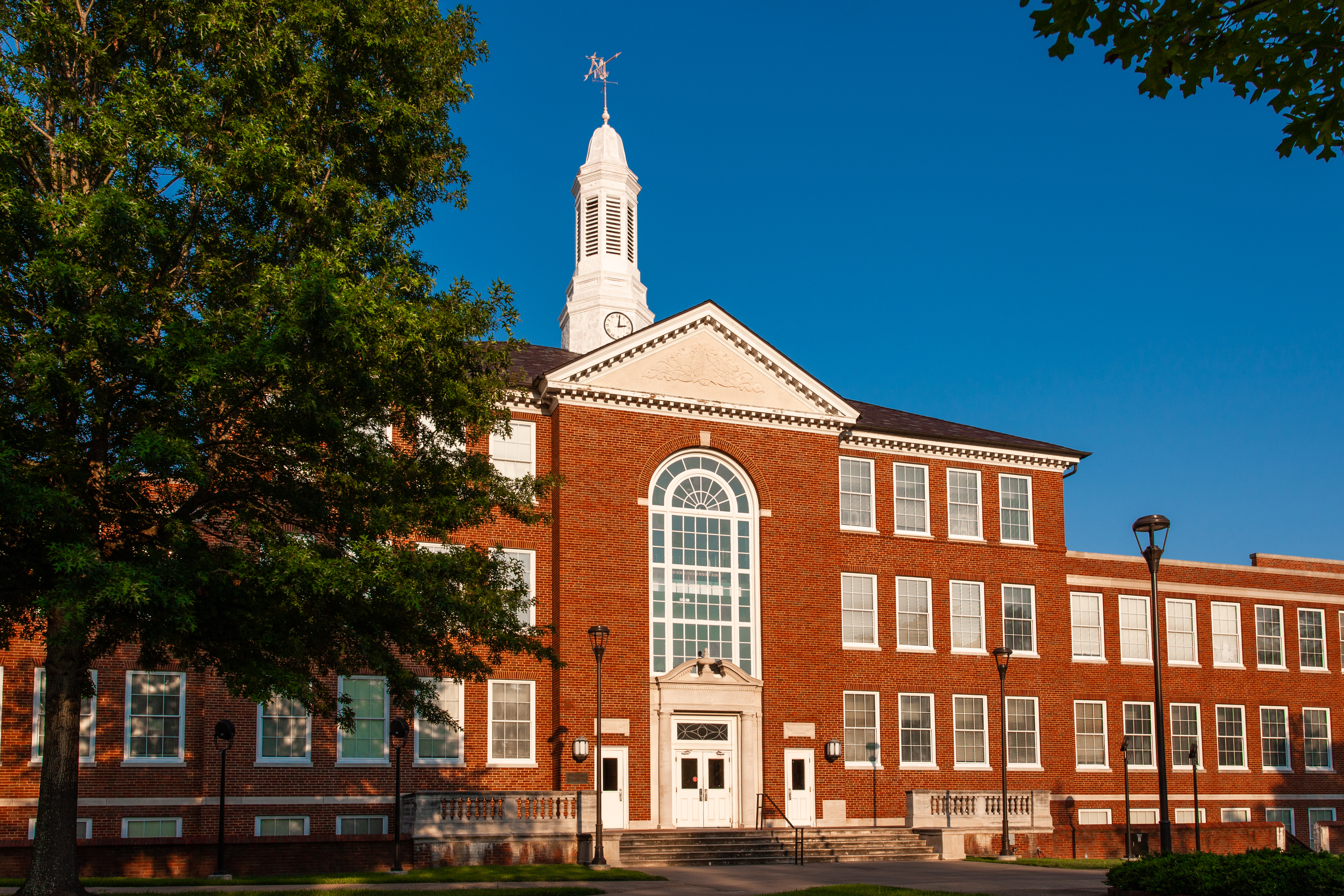
- Location: Keeny Circle, Ruston, Louisiana
- Coordinates: 32°31′38″N 92°38′47″W
- Area: 6.5 acres (2.6 ha)
- Built: 1936
- Built by: Caldwell Brothers and Hart
- Architect: Weiss, Dreyfous and Seiferth; Neild, Somdal & Neild
- Architectural style: Colonial Revival
- MPS: The 1930s Building Boom at Louisiana Tech MRA
- NRHP reference No.: 98000114
- Added to NRHP: February 20, 1998

- Prescott Memorial Library, Louisiana Tech University
- U.S. National Register of Historic Places
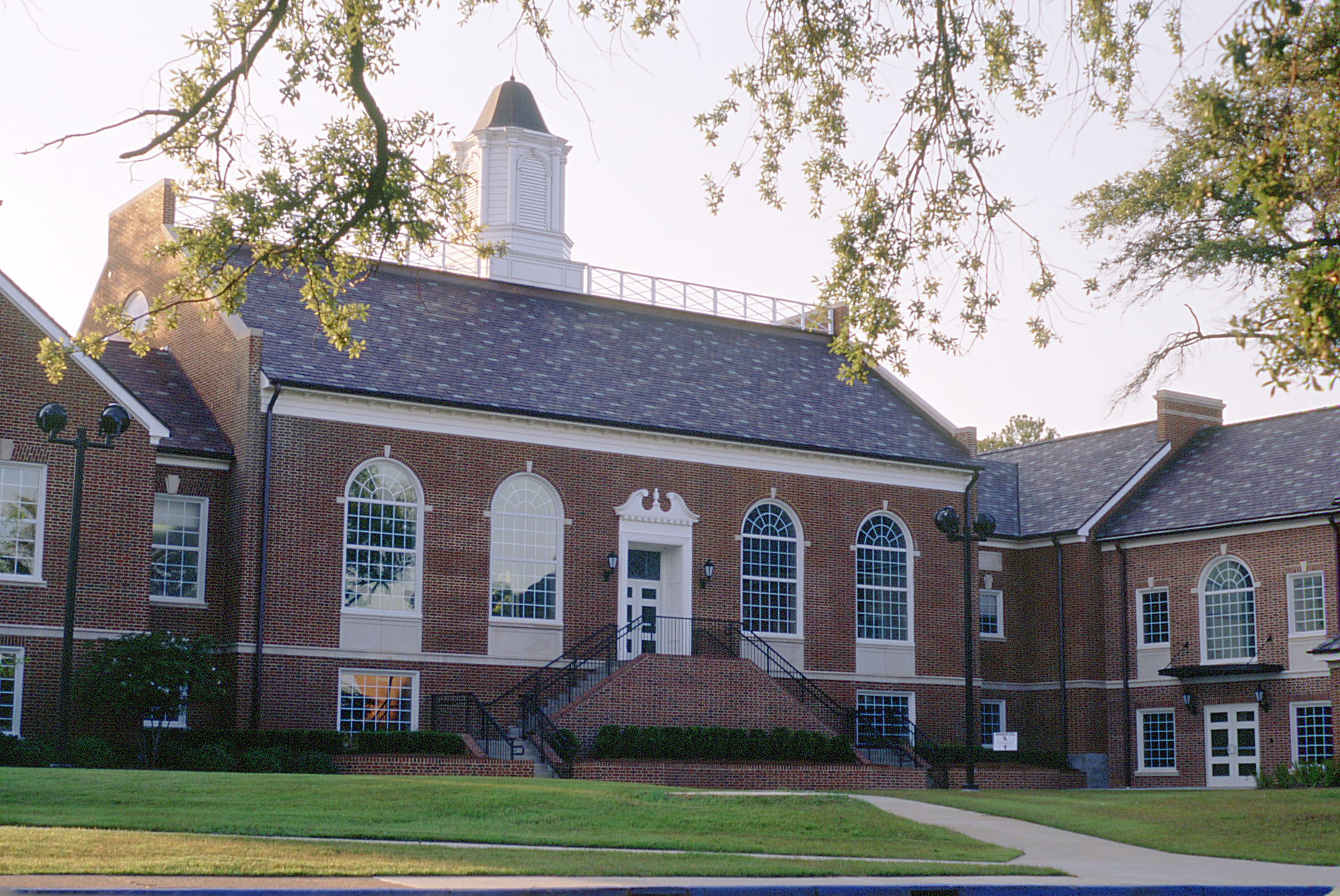
- Old Prescott Memorial Library, now University Hall
- Location: Keeny Circle, Ruston, Louisiana
- Coordinates: 32°31′41″N 92°38′46″W
- Area: less than one acre
- Built: 1926
- Architect: Neild, Somdal & Neild
- Architectural style: Colonial Revival
- MPS: The 1930s Building Boom at Louisiana Tech MRA
- NRHP reference No.: 98000116
- Added to NRHP: February 20, 1998

- Reese Agriculture Building, Louisiana Tech University
- U.S. National Register of Historic Places
- Location: Reese Drive, Ruston, Louisiana
- Coordinates: 32°31′04″N 92°39′20″W
- Area: less than one acre
- Built: 1939-40
- Built by: C. E. Andrews
- Architect: Neild, Somdal & Neild
- MPS: The 1930s Building Boom at Louisiana Tech MRA
- NRHP reference No.: 98000118
- Added to NRHP: February 20, 1998

- Robinson Hall, Louisiana Tech University
- U.S. National Register of Historic Places
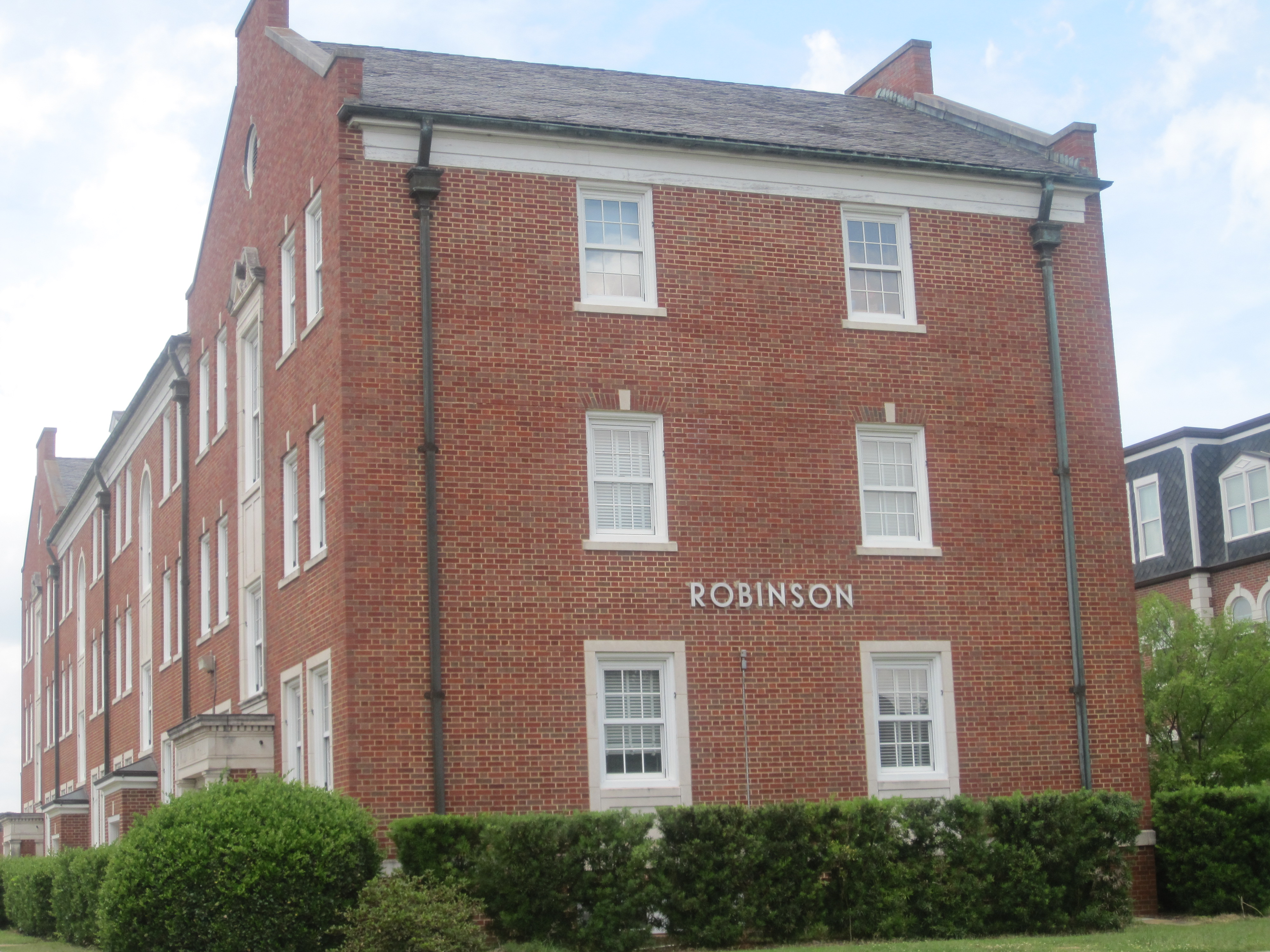
- Location: Madison Avenue, Ruston, Louisiana
- Coordinates: 32°31′40″N 92°39′00″W
- Area: less than one acre
- Built: 1939
- Built by: T.L. James
- Architect: Neild, Somdal & Neild
- Architectural style: Colonial Revival
- MPS: The 1930s Building Boom at Louisiana Tech MRA
- NRHP reference No.: 98000117
- Added to NRHP: February 20, 1998

- Toliver Dining Hall, Louisiana Tech University
- U.S. National Register of Historic Places
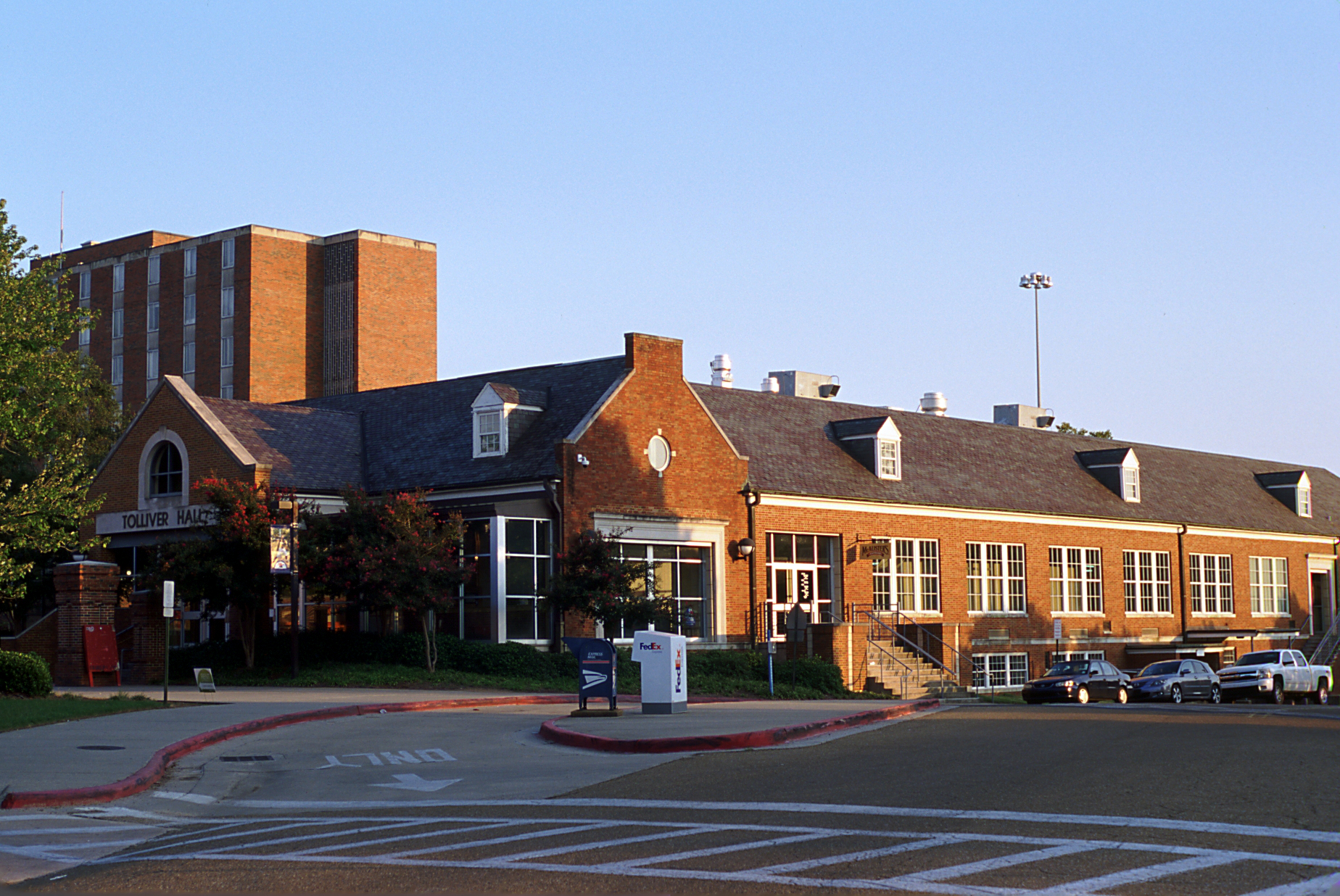
- Location: Wisteria Street, Ruston, Louisiana
- Coordinates: 32°31′35″N 92°38′57″W
- Area: less than one acre
- Built: 1939
- Architect: Neild, Somdal & Neild
- Architectural style: Colonial Revival
- MPS: The 1930s Building Boom at Louisiana Tech MRA
- NRHP reference No.: 98000115
- Added to NRHP: February 20, 1998

The state of Louisiana adopted a new constitution on June 18, 1921. The Constitution of 1921 changed the name of the school from the Louisiana Industrial Institute to Louisiana Polytechnic Institute. After the name change, the institute continued to reorganize its courses of study. In 1926, the curricula of Louisiana Polytechnic Institute was organized into three schools: The School of Education, The School of Engineering, and the School of Liberal Arts and Sciences.

=== Growing Pains ===
By the mid-1930s, the institute was beginning to show "growing pains". Student enrollment grew by almost 60% from 1933 to 1937 while funding from the state increased by only 17% during the same period. The on-campus dormitories and dining hall struggled to meet the needs of the growing student body. The situation was so bad that the Southern Association of Colleges and Secondary Schools, the school's accrediting agency, placed the school on probation in 1937. Among the factors cited by the agency were a high student-teacher ratio, crowded classrooms, library facilities that failed to meet the minimum standards, and a low teaching cost. Additional problems included turning away male students from admission into the agriculture department as a result of inadequate farm facilities and a decrease in the operating budget of the School of Engineering between 1933 and 1937 despite a 268% increase in student enrollment. After the probation was imposed on the school, the student body and Louisiana Polytechnic Institute President Edwin Richardson sought additional appropriations from the State legislature to expand the infrastructure at the school's campus.

The first major construction project on the Tech campus would be the construction of a new administration building to replace "Old Main". On January 6, 1936, a fire completely destroyed the Old Main Building, the home of the institute's administrative offices and the first building constructed on the Tech campus. The building was completed in 1937 and named after Richard W. Leche, the Governor of Louisiana at the time. Around 1940, the building was renamed Keeny Hall in honor of John Keeny, a former president of the school from 1908 to 1926 who had died the previous year. Another reason for the building's name change was due to Governor Leche having been imprisoned along with a number of state officials in the infamous Louisiana Scandals of 1939.

=== Building Boom of 1939–1940 ===
Despite the completion of the Keeny Hall in 1937, Louisiana Polytechnic Institute still faced problems as it tried to fit the growing student body onto the undersized campus. For years, the school lobbied the State Legislature in order to obtain increased funding from the state government. School officials also sought the assistance of the Federal Government through appropriations from the New Deal relief funds. The school's initial proposal was to build twenty new buildings on campus which would have doubled the number of buildings at the school from 20 to 40. Although the initial proposal was scaled back due to high demand for Federal funds, many of the major buildings were approved with about $2,000,000 to be used for the construction of the six campus buildings.

The new buildings constructed on the Tech campus between 1938 and 1940 were: Howard Auditorium, a 3,000 seat auditorium and classroom building named after Tech's first graduate Harry Howard; Bogard Hall, the large three-story building for the School of Engineering that marked the first expansion of the engineering school's facilities since 1905; Robinson Hall, a men's dormitory; Tolliver Hall, also known as Toliver Dining Hall, a large dining hall designed to serve 800 students compared to the old dining hall which only seated 250 students; Reese Hall, also known as Reese Agriculture Building, a two-story classroom and lab building for the school of agriculture; and Aswell Hall, a women's dormitory. Most of the new buildings were built in the heart of the old campus in the Colonial Revival style. The only exceptions were Reese Hall which was built on the Tech Farm campus and Howard Auditorium which was a Streamlined Moderne building.

In 1936, the Student Government Association was formed as the governing body of the institute's students. Four years later, the Student Union (now the Union Board) were created to build campus spirit, promote a well-rounded campus program, and assure personal development for every Tech student.

In 1998, all these buildings were individually added, along with Keeny Hall and the former Prescott Memorial Library (now University Hall), to the National Register of Historic Places as part of "The 1930s Building Boom at Louisiana Tech" Multiple Resource Area.

== See also ==
- National Register of Historic Places listings in Lincoln Parish, Louisiana
