= Decamerion Richardson =

American football player (born 2001)

No. 25 – New Orleans Saints
- Position: Cornerback
- Roster status: Active

Personal information
- Born: March 16, 2001 (age 25); Cullen, Louisiana, U.S.
- Listed height: 6 ft 2 in (1.88 m)
- Listed weight: 192 lb (87 kg)

Career information
- High school: Bossier (Bossier City, Louisiana)
- College: Mississippi State (2020–2023)
- NFL draft: 2024: 4th round, 112th overall pick

Career history
- Las Vegas Raiders (2024–2025); New Orleans Saints (2026–present)

Career NFL statistics as of 2025
- Tackles: 57
- Pass deflections: 3
- Stats at Pro Football Reference

Decamerion Jalynn Richardson (born March 16, 2001) is an American professional football cornerback for the New Orleans Saints of the National Football League (NFL). He played college football for the Mississippi State Bulldogs and was selected by the Las Vegas Raiders in the fourth round of the 2024 NFL draft.

== Early life ==
Richardson grew up in Cullen, Louisiana and attended Bossier High School where he lettered in football and track & field. Coming out of high school, Richardson was rated as a three star recruit where he committed to play for the Mississippi State Bulldogs.

== College career ==
=== Mississippi State ===
In Richardson's first season in 2021, he made 13 tackles. During the 2022 season, Richardson notched 85 tackles and three pass deflections. In 2023, Richardson tallied 79 tackles which finished tenth in the SEC along with seven pass deflections. After the conclusion of the 2023 season, Richardson decided to enter the NCAA transfer portal.

=== Ole Miss ===
Richardson decided to transfer to play for the Ole Miss Rebels. However just under a month later, Richardson decided to declare for the 2024 NFL draft.

== Professional career ==
Pre-draft measurables
Height	Weight	Arm length	Hand span	Wingspan	40-yard dash	10-yard split	20-yard split	20-yard shuttle	Three-cone drill	Vertical jump	Broad jump	Bench press
6 ft 2 1/4 in (1.89 m)	188 lb (85 kg)	32 3/8 in (0.82 m)	8 7/8 in (0.23 m)	6 ft 5 7/8 in (1.98 m)	4.34 s	1.48 s	2.55 s	4.26 s	6.96 s	35.0 in (0.89 m)	10 ft 8 in (3.25 m)	8 reps
All values from NFL Combine/Pro Day

=== Las Vegas Raiders ===
Richardson was drafted by the Las Vegas Raiders in the fourth round (112th overall) of the 2024 NFL draft.

On August 31, 2026, Richardson was waived by the Raiders.

=== New Orleans Saints ===
On September 1, 2026, Richardson was claimed off of waivers by the New Orleans Saints.

== NFL career statistics ==
Legend
**Bold**	Career high

=== Regular season ===
Year	Team	Games		Tackles					Interceptions						Fumbles				
Year	Team	GP	GS	Cmb	Solo	Ast	Sck	TFL	Int	Yds	Avg	Lng	TD	PD	FF	Fum	FR	Yds	TD
2024	LV	12	**7**	**46**	**27**	**19**	0.0	**1**	0	0	0.0	0	0	**3**	0	0	0	0	0
2025	LV	**15**	0	11	9	2	0.0	0	0	0	0.0	0	0	0	0	0	0	0	0
Career		27	7	57	36	21	0.0	1	0	0	0.0	0	0	3	0	0	0	0	0
