= Edward F. Neild =

American architect

Edward Fairfax Neild Sr.
- Neild circa 1950-1960
- Born: December 3, 1884; Shreveport, Louisiana, US
- Died: July 6, 1955 (aged 70); Kansas City, Missouri, US
- Resting place: Forest Park East Cemetery in Shreveport
- Education: Tulane University
- Occupations: Architect of Harry S. Truman Presidential Library and Museum and many public buildings in Louisiana
- Spouse: Ethel Land Neild (married 1907-1955, his death)
- Children: 3

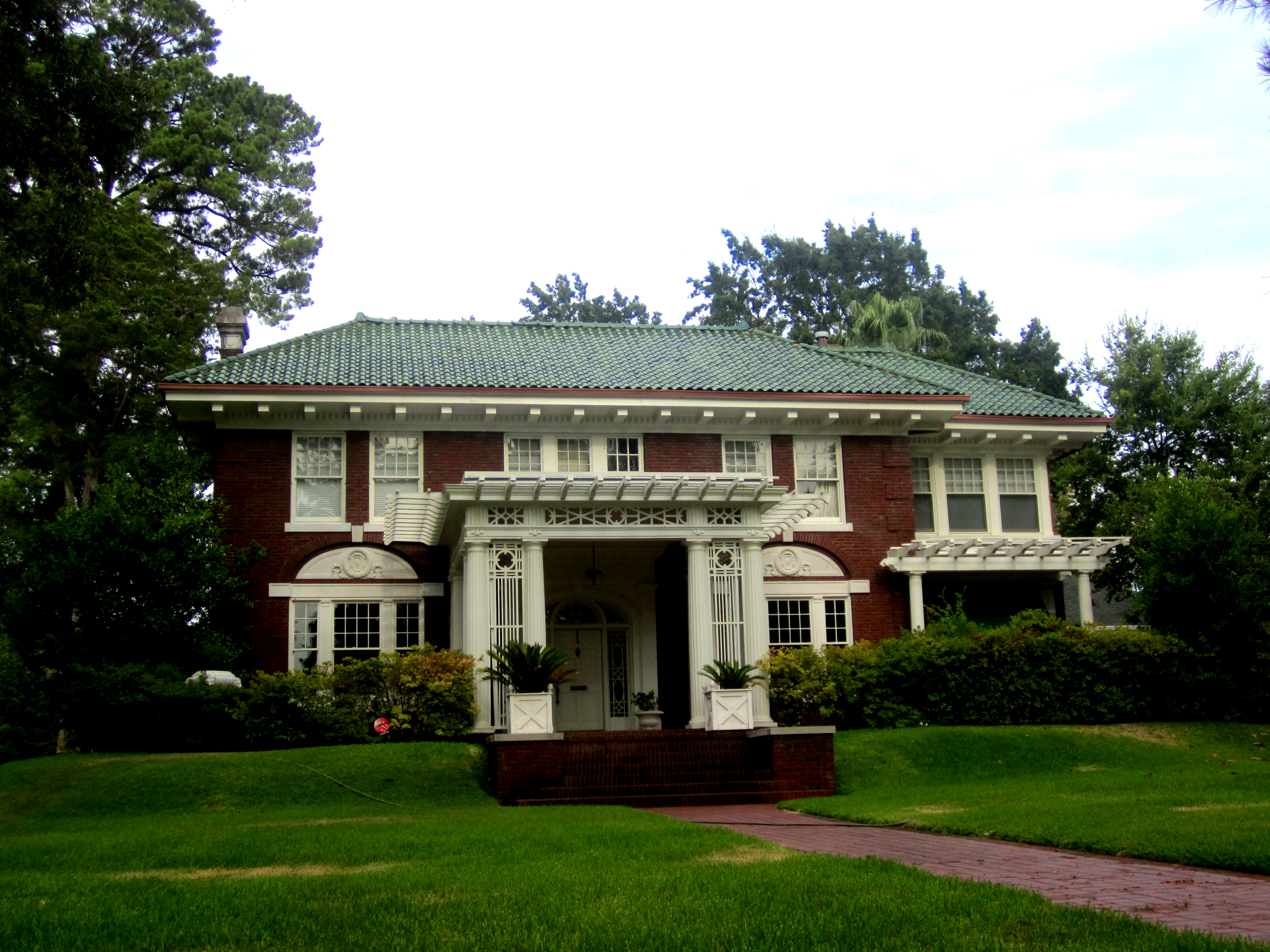
Neild also designed private homes, such as the Pine Wold house located at Fairfield Avenue at Kirby Street in Shreveport. A circus once wintered on the grounds of the home.

Edward Fairfax Neild Sr. FAIA (December 3, 1884 – July 6, 1955), was an American architect originally from Shreveport, Louisiana. He designed the Harry S. Truman Presidential Library and Museum in Independence, Missouri. He was selected for the task by U.S. President Harry Truman.

== Biography ==
He was in partnerships Neild, Somdal and Neild, Somdal, Neild, with Dewey A. Somdal and with his son, Edward Fairfax Nield Jr. Somdal Associates, Shreveport, is the descendant of the Neild firm.

Neild served as president of the Shreveport chapter of the American Institute of Architects (AIA) in 1926 and from 1937 to 1939; Dewey Somdal was the president from 1940 to 1943; Edward F. Nield Jr., in 1951. In 1948, Neild was among twenty distinguished architects selected as fellows of the American Institute of Architects.

Other Neild-designed buildings in Shreveport include: the Louisiana State Exhibit Building at the Louisiana State Fairgrounds, Schumpert Hospital, Barret Elementary School, C. E. Byrd High School, the Scottish Rite Cathedral, the Calanthean Temple, Cathedral of St. John Berchmans (Shreveport, Louisiana), and the Overton Brooks Veterans Administration Medical Center.

A number of Neild's works have been listed on the National Register of Historic Places as significant buildings for their architecture. Nield's son, Edward F. Neild Jr., was also an architect and designed the Hirsch Memorial Coliseum in Shreveport. From 1937 to 1938, the two men worked together on the Louisiana State Exhibit Museum in Shreveport, which opened in 1939.

Neild died in Kansas City, Missouri, at the age of seventy.

== Works ==
Other Neild works include (with attribution):

- Arlington Ridge Park, NW corner of N. Meade St. and Marshall Dr. Arlington, Virginia (Neild, Edward F.), NRHP
- B'Nai Zion Temple, 802 Cotton St. Shreveport Neild, Edward F.), NRHP
- Baton Rouge Junior High School (built 1922), 1100 Laurel St. Baton Rouge Neild, Edward F.), NRHP
- Bogard Hall-Louisiana Tech University, Junction of Arizona and College St. Ruston, Louisiana Neild, Somdal & Neild), NRHP
- Bossier High School, 322 Colquitt St. Bossier City, LA Neild, Edward F.), NRHP
- C. E. Byrd High School, 3201 Line Ave. Shreveport, LA Neild, Edward F.), NRHP
- Calanthean Temple (1923) for the Order of Calanthe in Shreveport, part of the St. Paul's Bottoms historic district
- Capital City Press Building, 340 Florida Baton Rouge, LA Neild, Edward F.), NRHP
- Fair Park High School, 3222 Greenwood Rd. Shreveport, LA Neild, Edward F.), NRHP
- Heidelberg Hotel, 201 Lafayette St. Baton Rouge, LA Neild, Edward F.), NRHP
- Heidelberg Hotel and Hotel King (boundary increase) 200 Lafayette St. Baton Rouge Neild, Edward F.), NRHP
- John M. Parker Agricultural Coliseum

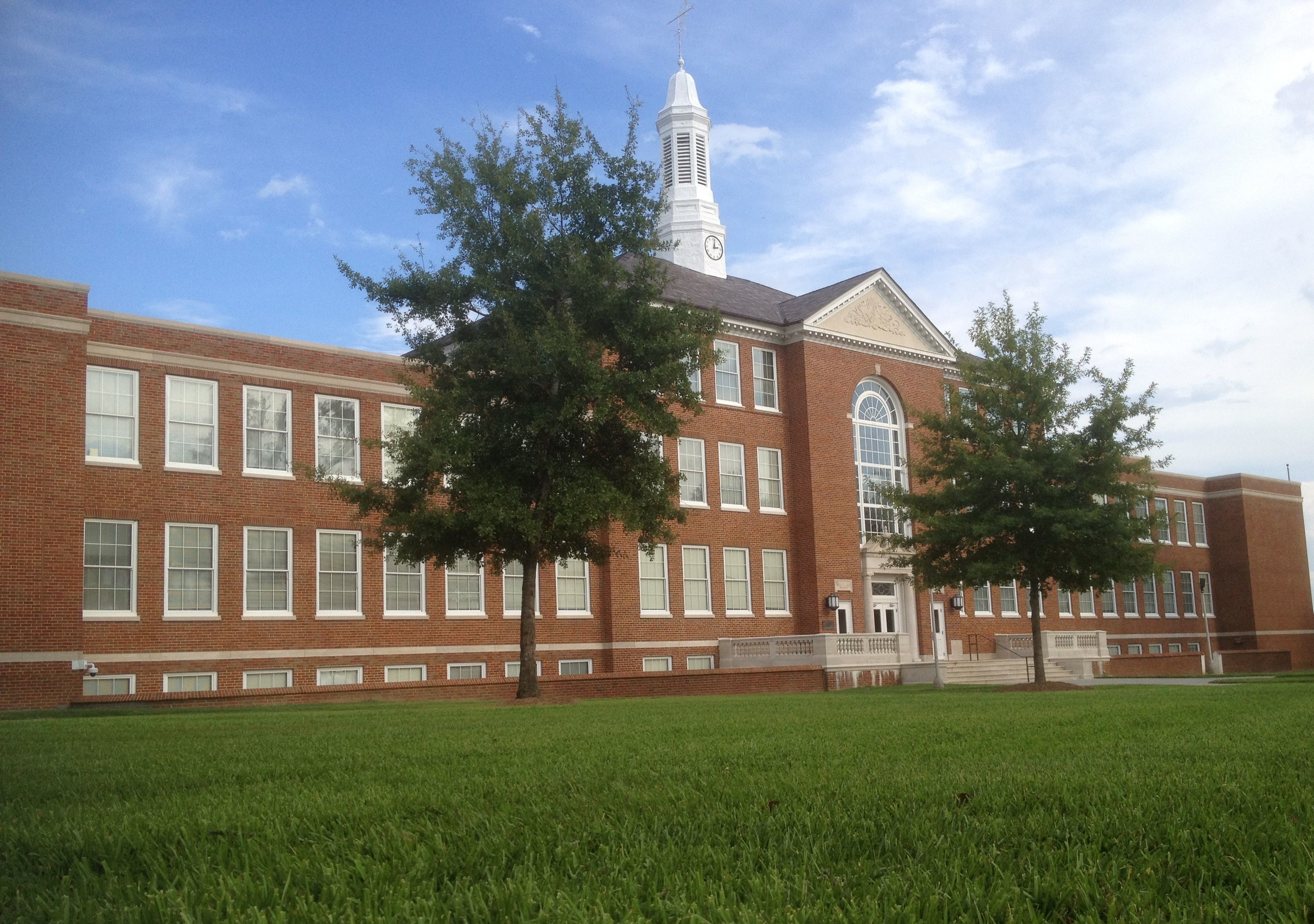
Keeny Hall, the administrative headquarters at Louisiana Tech University, is one of Neild's numerous campus buildings.

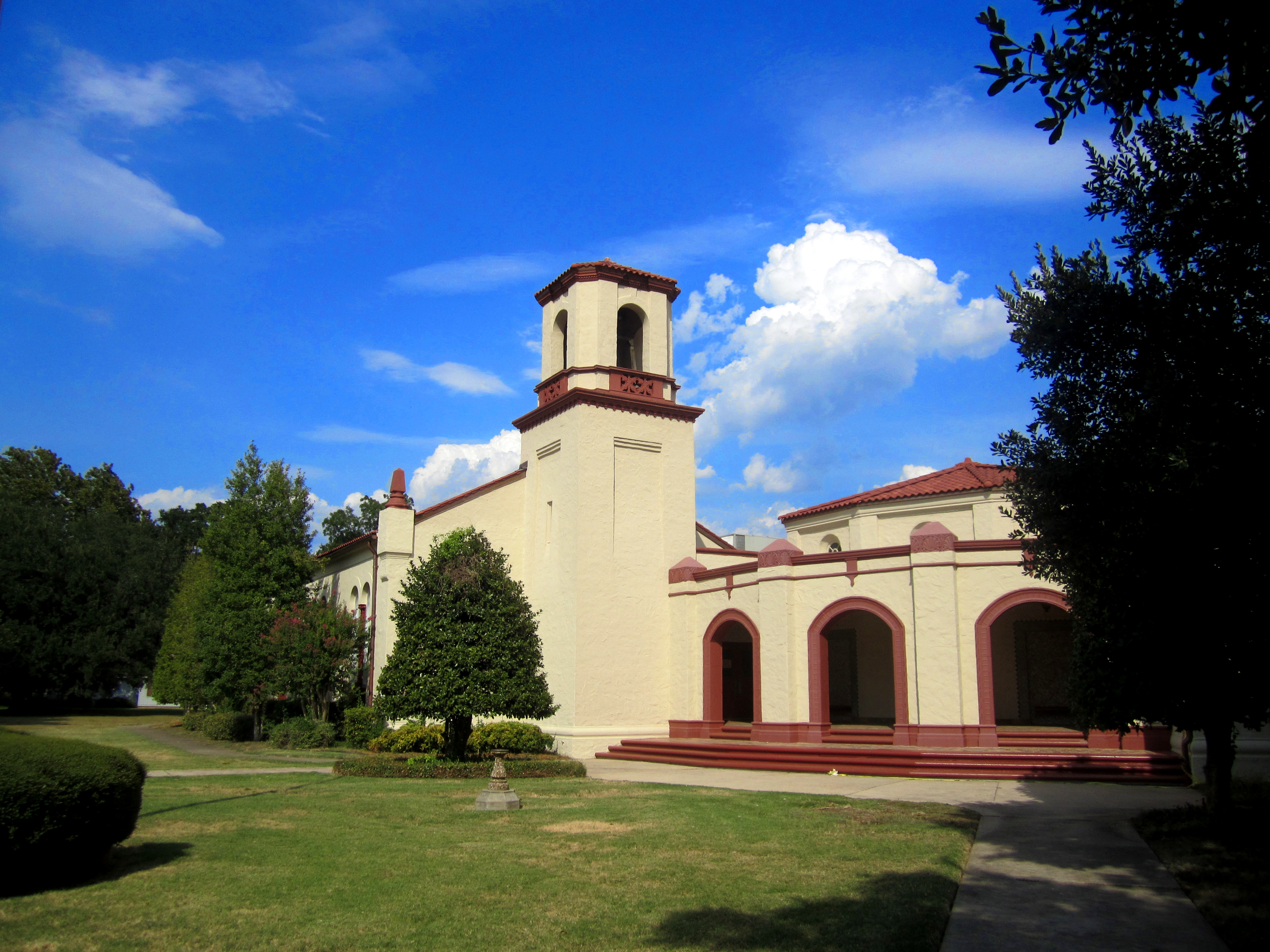
A.C. Steere School, designed by Edward F. Neild and expanded in 1938, is named for developer Albert Coldwell Steere. He founded the Broadmoor neighborhood of Shreveport.

- Howard Auditorium-Louisiana Tech University, Jct. of Adams Blvd. and Arizona St. Ruston Neild, Somdal & Neild), NRHP
- Keeny Hall-Louisiana Tech University, Keeny Circle Ruston, LA Neild, Somdal & Neild), NRHP
- One or more works in Lake Charles Historic District, Roughly bounded by Iris, Hodges, Lawrence, Kirkman, S. Divission and Louisiana Lake Charles, LA Neild, Edward F.), NRHP
- Louisiana State Exhibit Museum in Shreveport, 3015 Greenwood Road, Shreveport, LA 71109
- Maricopa County Courthouse, 125 W. Washington St. Phoenix, Arizona Neild, Edward F.), NRHP-listed
- Mooringsport School, 602 Latimer St. Mooringsport, Louisiana Neild, Edward F.), NRHP
- Mooringsport Masonic Lodge, Croom St. Mooringsport, Louisiana Neild, Edward F.), NRHP
- Prescott Memorial Library-Louisiana Tech University, Keeny Circle Ruston, LA Neild, Somdal & Neild), NRHP
- Rayville High School, 109 Madeline St., Rayville, Louisiana Neild, Edward F.), NRHP
- Reese Agriculture Building-Louisiana Tech University, Tech Farm, US 80 Ruston Neild, Somdal & Neild), NRHP
- Robinson Hall-Louisiana Tech University, Madison Ave. Ruston Neild, Somdal & Neild), NRHP
- Scott Street School, 900 N. 19th St. Baton Rouge Neild, Edward F.), NRHP
- Scottish Rite Cathedral, 725 Cotton St. Shreveport Neild, Edward F.), NRHP
- Shreveport Municipal Building, 724 McNeil St., Shreveport Neild, Edward F.), NRHP
- Steere, A. C., Elementary School, 4009 Youree Dr. Shreveport, LA Neild, Edward Fairfax), NRHP
- Toliver Dining Hall-Louisiana Tech University, Wisteria St. Ruston, LA Neild, Somdal & Neild), NRHP
- US Post Office and Courthouse-Alexandria, 515 Murray St. Alexandria, Louisiana Neild, Edward F.), NRHP
- Wray-Dickinson Building, 308 Market St., Shreveport Neild, Edward F.), NRHP
