= United States Post Office and Courthouse–Alexandria =

- US Post Office and Courthouse--Alexandria
- U.S. National Register of Historic Places
- U.S. Post Office and Court House

- Location within Louisiana Location within the United States
- Location: 515 Murray St., Alexandria, Louisiana
- Coordinates: 31°18′38″N 92°45′40″W
- Area: 1 acre (0.40 ha)
- Built: 1932
- Architect: Edward F. Neild
- Architectural style: Art Deco, Moderne
- NRHP reference No.: 00000501
- Added to NRHP: May 18, 2000

The U.S. Post Office and Courthouse, located in Alexandria, Louisiana, was built in 1932, pursuant to the Public Buildings Act of 1926. Also known as Alexandria Federal Building, it is an Art Deco, Moderne architecture building. It served historically as a post office, as a courthouse, and as a government office building. It was listed on the National Register of Historic Places in 2000.

The building was designed by Shreveport architect Edward F. Neild.

== Architectural description ==
The courthouse is located in the Central Business District of Alexandria. The federal building is an Art Deco styled, limestone structure with a massive central pavilion resembling a raised temple, and lower projecting wings at each end, topped by a recessed penthouse. Vertical reeded pilasters separate vertical window bays of paired two over two windows. The "raised temple" effect of the second and third floors rests atop a limestone base punctuated by smaller window openings. A massive central doorway is flanked by two smaller door openings. The walls are light buff limestone and rest on a pearl white granite base. The main elevation faces northwest. Each corner of the building (at the projecting wings) begins with square corners and then exhibits gradual chamfering to the roof corner of the wing. The chamfer effect appears to give the building a more massive look at ground level and a more delicate look at the roof line.

The first floor and mezzanine are simply detailed; the majority of the ornamentation is concentrated on the second and third floors. All first floor windows have a verde green marble spandrel ornamented by cast metal rod motif at either side. The main entry to the building is at the center of the northwest elevation. There are broad granite steps and cheek walls which lead to the entries. The cheek walls are ornamented with horizontal incised scoring at the top and an unusual Art Deco style light standard rests atop each cheek wall. The standard has a bronze shaft trimmed at each corner with aluminum. Four concentric aluminum circles form a "cage" for the cylinder itself at the apex of the shaft.

The three main entry doors are set within a stepped-back limestone surround. The large main door is a double door set in the center of the elevation, and smaller single entry doors flank the main one. There are ornamental cast bronze grilles above wave-like lintels atop the doors. The central grille depicts the stage coach, steam ship and mail train. The single doors depict mail delivery by packet boat and airplane. Above each single entry door is a carved, recessed limestone plaque with the American eagle motif.

The central pavilion of the building is divided into nine bays at the second and third floors. The two bays at either end are framed by unembellished pilasters. The remaining portion of the central pavilion is divided into seven bays by six reeded engaged pilasters. A limestone entablature runs along the perimeter of the building above the third floor. The entablature is enriched by incised octagonal plaques above each reeded pilaster on the northwest elevation and above each bay of windows on the northeast and southwest elevations. The plaques have an octagon at the center from which radiate reeded spokes at the four primary sides. This motif is compatible with the door detail of the lobby. The third floor plaque at each corner of the building is flanked by a decorative stand of three incised rods. Second and third floor windows are separated vertically by a cast bronze spandrel panel embellished with the same motif as the incised plaques. The simple cornice is ornamented by a fluted band spanning the perimeter of the building above the third floor. The projecting wings have slightly different embellishment. The corner window lintels feature a recessed block with a carved sunburst motif.

The northeast and southwest elevations are not as ornate but maintain some of detail of the northwest elevation. The central facade of the northeast and southwest elevations is divided into three window bays. At the second floor these windows feature a set-back lintel with reeded trim. The center of the lintel features the octagon and spoke motif as on the northwest elevation. The cornice of the projecting wings is fluted. There is limestone cresting in the wave motif over the projecting central bay. The decorative cornice at the third floor is fluted.

The southeast (rear) elevation is utilitarian in nature. The former loading dock is at the center of the elevation at the first floor. It is clad with limestone and has a steel marquee. A contemporary fire stair sits at the south corner. All first floor windows have verde green marble spandrels. The second and third floor windows at the south end of the elevation exhibit the same spandrel panels as on the northwest (main) elevation. Five bays of windows in the center of the elevation at the second and third floors mark the position of the original courtroom.

The main lobby and monumental stair are character-defining original features of the building. The lobby has full-height marble paneling, terrazzo floors, a plaster panel ceiling, some original doors, and original light fixtures. The staircase is curved marble with aluminum rails. The stair turns around a marble column ornamented by concentric aluminum strips at the center between the first and second floors. The lobby is currently dominated by a concession stand.

The remainder of the interior of the building (including the courtroom) has been remodeled and little original material remains.

== See also ==
- List of United States post offices
