= National Register of Historic Places listings in Bossier Parish, Louisiana =

Location of Bossier Parish in Louisiana

This is a list of the National Register of Historic Places listings in Bossier Parish, Louisiana.

This is intended to be a complete list of the properties on the National Register of Historic Places in Bossier Parish, Louisiana, United States. The locations of National Register properties for which the latitude and longitude coordinates are included below, may be seen in a map.

There are 6 properties listed on the National Register in the parish.

This National Park Service list is complete through NPS recent listings posted December 12, 2025.

== Current listings ==
	Name on the Register	Image	Date listed	Location	City or town	Description
1	Barksdale Field Historic District	Barksdale Field Historic District	April 13, 1992 (#92000332)	Junction of U.S. Route 71 and West Gate Drive; 32°30′11″N 93°40′48″W	Bossier City	
2	Bossier City Municipal Building	Bossier City Municipal Building	March 28, 2002 (#02000267)	630 Barksdale Boulevard; 32°30′56″N 93°43′57″W	Bossier City	
3	Bossier High School	Bossier High School	August 31, 1998 (#98001079)	1000 Traffic Street; 32°31′20″N 93°44′11″W	Bossier City	
4	Bossier High School	Bossier High School	September 30, 2004 (#04001078)	777 Bearkat Drive; 32°31′09″N 93°43′47″W	Bossier City	
5	Ash Point Plantation House	Ash Point Plantation House	August 11, 1982 (#82002757)	North of Louisiana Highway 71 about 0.92 miles (1.48 km) southeast of Taylortown and 2.43 miles (3.91 km) northwest of Elm Grove; 32°22′42″N 93°35′01″W	Elm Grove vicinity	
6	Hughes House	Hughes House	October 22, 1996 (#96001163)	414 Sibley Street; 32°41′39″N 93°44′23″W	Benton	Enlisted in 1976 at original location on LA 160, 13 miles (21 km) northeast of Benton with NRHP reference #76000962. Delisted for move in September 1996 and relisted with new reference number (#96001163) in October 1996.

== See also ==
- List of National Historic Landmarks in Louisiana
- National Register of Historic Places listings in Louisiana
