= Bossier City Municipal Building =

- U.S. National Register of Historic Places
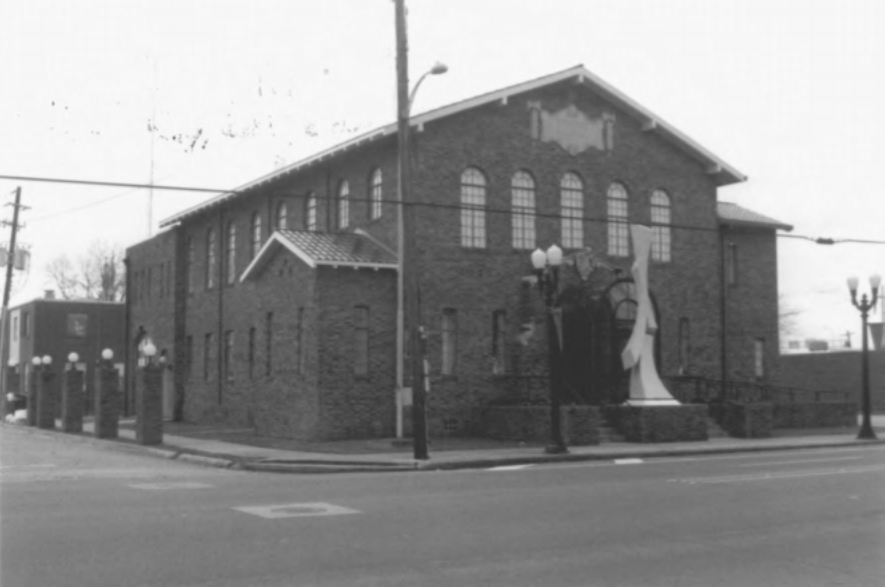

- Location within Louisiana
- Location: 630 Barksdale Boulevard, Bossier City, Louisiana
- Coordinates: 32°30′56″N 93°43′57″W
- Area: less than one acre
- Built: 1926
- Architect: Jones, Roessle, Olschner & Wiener
- Architectural style: Renaissance
- NRHP reference No.: 02000267
- Added to NRHP: March 28, 2002

The Bossier City Municipal Building, at 630 Barksdale Boulevard in Bossier City, Louisiana, was built in 1926. It was listed on the National Register of Historic Places in 2002.

It is a two-story brick building which originally included city offices, an auditorium/council chamber, a jail and a fire station. It was converted in the 1980s to be home for the Bossier Arts Council.

It was designed by architects Jones, Roessle, Olschner & Wiener with some elements that can be termed Renaissance Revival in style. According to its NRHP nomination, it

has a romantic and evocative style that partakes of the Italian Renaissance and Baroque, although the effect is heavily dependent upon accent features rather than overall design. Despite some admittedly significant alterations over the years, the building retains the bulk of its original exterior character and would be easily recognizable to someone from the historic period. Hence it conveys its identity and historical significance as a “coming of age” for Bossier City. The Municipal Building’s Italian flavor can be seen in its villa-like asymmetrical massing under a low, broadly overhanging roof (originally clay tile) with widely spaced extended brackets. The asymmetry is minimal, but nonetheless convincing when seen from a three-quarter view. Massing takes the form of a large, low-pitch, gable-fronted main block with a one story projection on the east side and a two story projection containing the staircase on the west side. At the rear is a flat roofed fire station wing. The one story addition spanning the western elevation of the main block, behind the staircase “tower,” dates from the historic period. Its brickwork and windows are identical to the original construction. A series of great round arch windows on the second story facade and side elevations light what was originally the council chamber. Five of these windows span the façade. Above them, in the low gable, is a cast stone tablet with classical details identifying the building.

== See also ==
- National Register of Historic Places listings in Bossier Parish, Louisiana
