= Hilton Baton Rouge Capitol Center =

- Heidelberg Hotel and Hotel King
- U.S. National Register of Historic Places
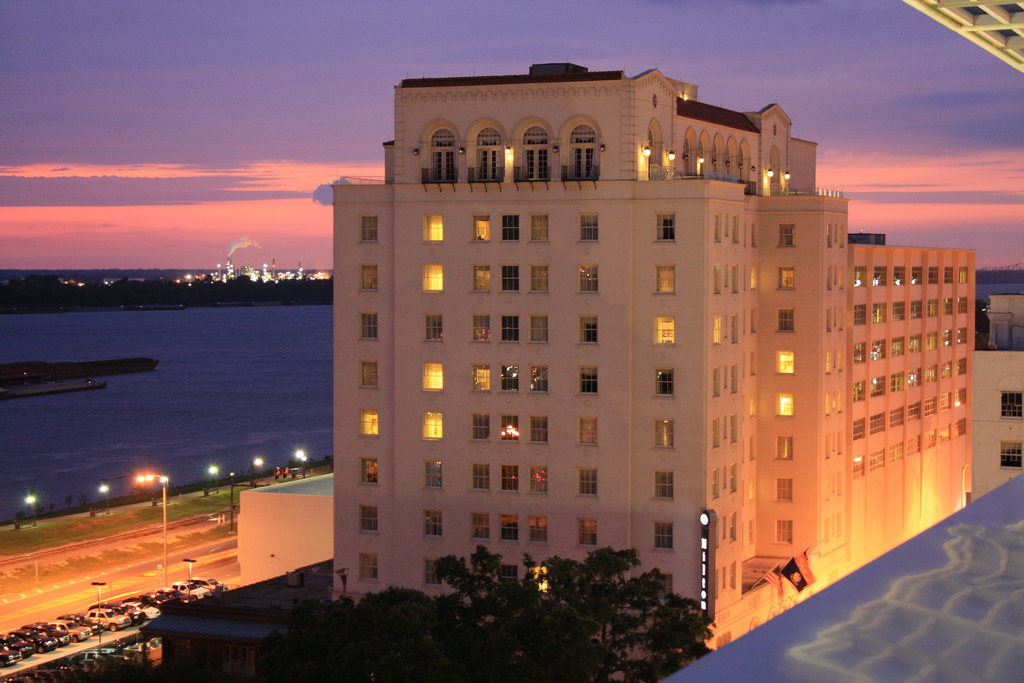

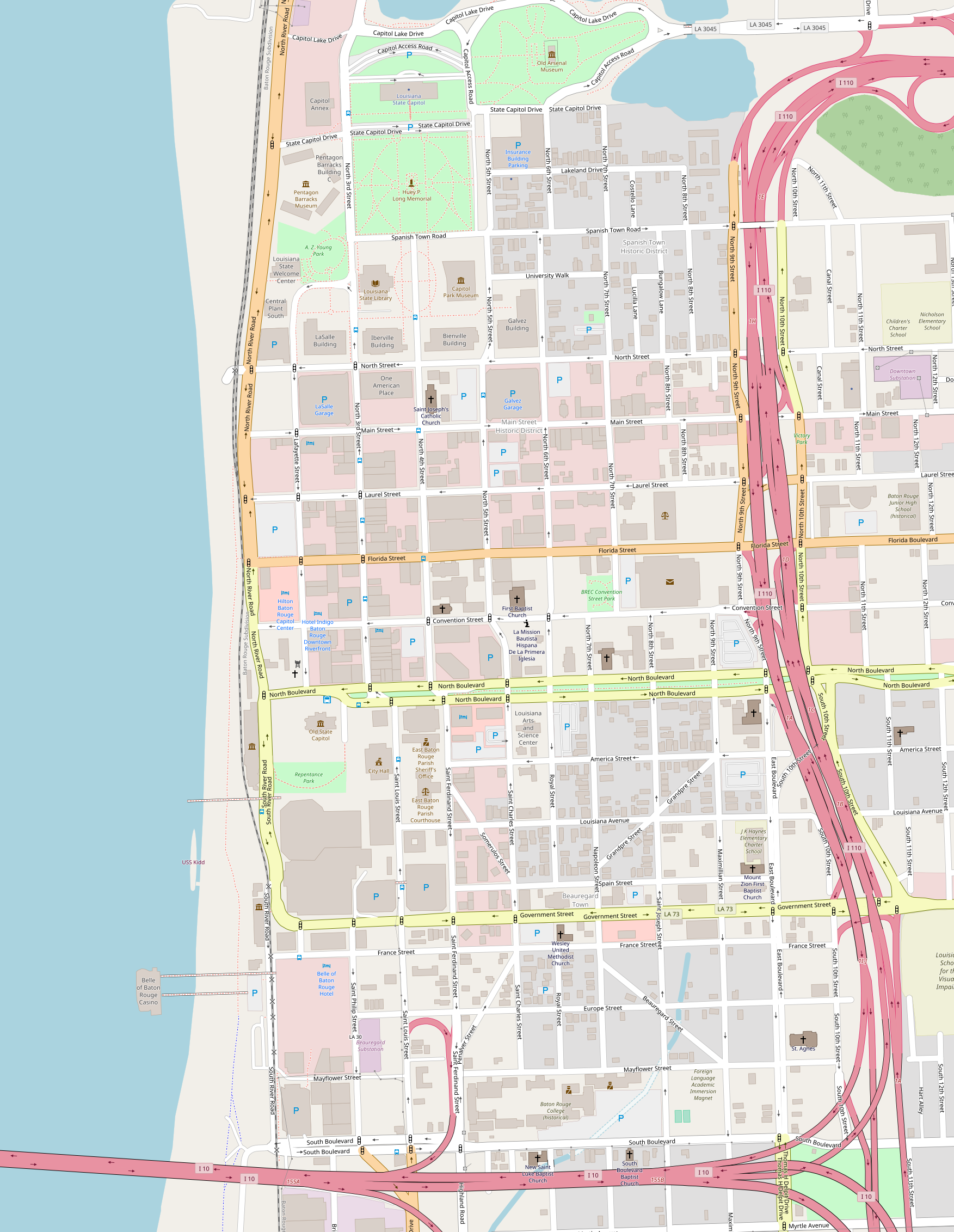
- Location within Baton Rouge Downtown
- Location: 200-201 Lafayette Street, Baton Rouge, Louisiana
- Coordinates: 30°26′55″N 91°11′22″W
- Area: 2 acres (0.81 ha)
- Built: 1927
- Built by: Ashton Glassell Company
- Architect: Edward F. Neild
- Architectural style: Skyscraper
- NRHP reference No.: 82002769 (original); 08000765 (increase)

Significant dates
- Added to NRHP: May 20, 1982
- Boundary increase: August 5, 2008

The Hilton Baton Rouge Capitol Center is a historic hotel in Baton Rouge, Louisiana, originally built in 1927 as the Heidelberg Hotel. It was listed on the National Register of Historic Places in 1982.

== History ==
The Heidelberg Hotel was a favorite dwelling of Louisiana Governor Huey P. Long, slept in his own personal room, a three bedroom king suite now on the second floor, the mezzanine floor. The hotel has over 700 rooms, 4 suites, a pool on the third floor which occupies the roof of the small garage on the northwest corner of the hotel. Some employees of the current hotel (2025) have said they have witnessed spiritual activity from time to time on the tenth floor and in the basement. A man wearing a long coat, bucket hat, and holding a cigar as Huey P. Long did in the 1920’s has been seen on the tenth floor. A faint cigar smell is also noted at times. The hotel has a massive underground basement which is home to a speakeasy known as The Tunnel. For a short time, it was known as the Capitol House Hotel, when under the management of former State Representative Chris Faser, Jr. Huey P. Long, John F. Kennedy, Hubert Humphrey, Jimmy Carter, Will Rogers, and Fidel Castro were all guests of the hotel.

The hotel closed in 1985, and was mostly derelict until 2005. It reopened after a $70 million renovation on August 30, 2006, as the Hilton Baton Rouge Capitol Center. the hotel was also inducted into Historic Hotels of America, the official program of the National Trust for Historic Preservation, since 2007.

The hotel's NRHP listing was increased in 2008 to include the Hotel King across the street and the listing was renamed Heidelberg Hotel and Hotel King .

== See also ==
- National Register of Historic Places listings in East Baton Rouge Parish, Louisiana
