= Bossier High School (Colquitt Street) =

- U.S. National Register of Historic Places
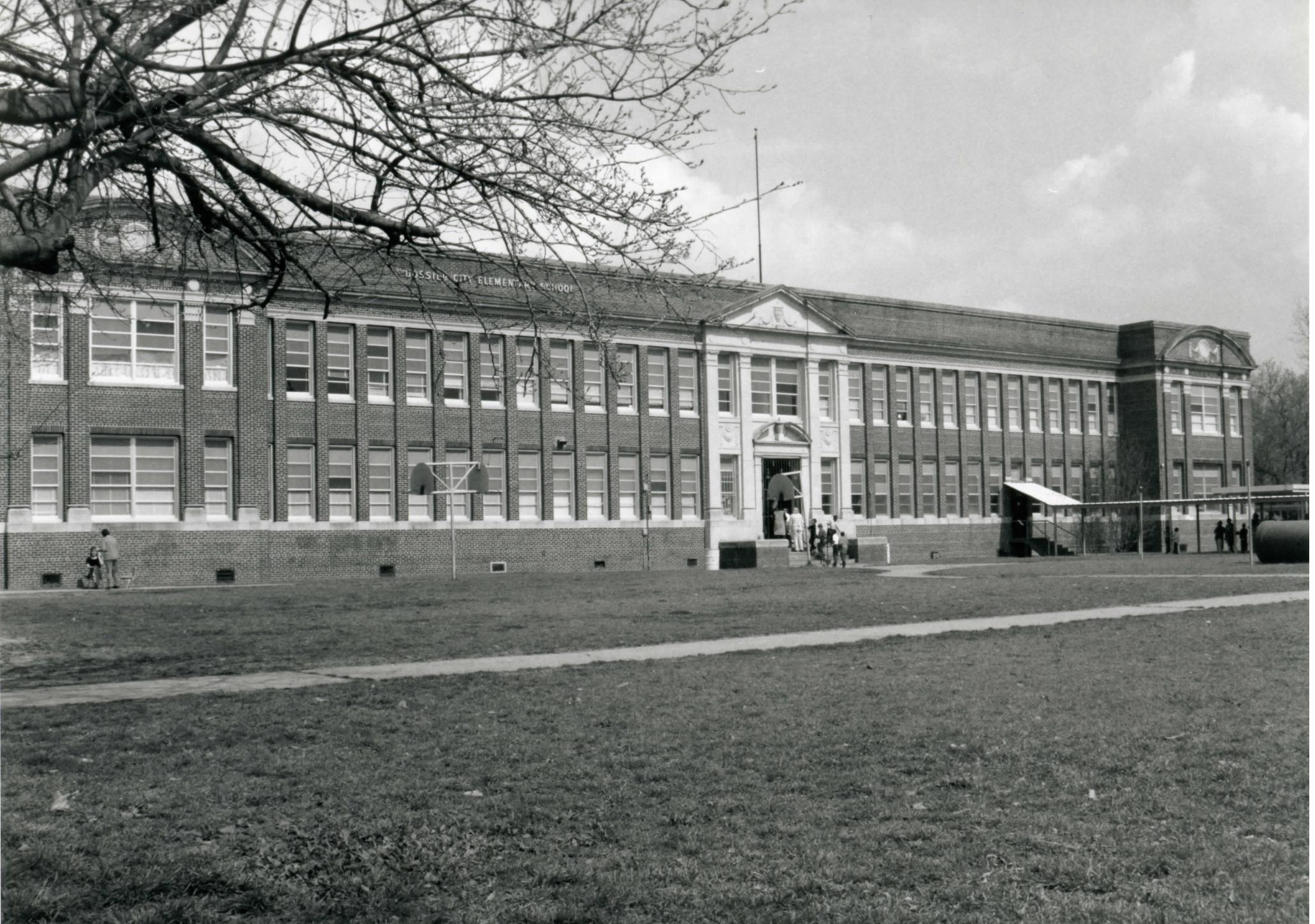
- Bossier High School on Colquittt Street in Bossier City, Louisiana in April 1998

- Location within Louisiana
- Interactive map of Bossier High School
- Location: 1000 Traffic Street, Bossier City, Louisiana
- Coordinates: 32°31′20″N 93°44′11″W
- Area: 4.9 acres (2.0 ha)
- Built: 1923, 1928
- Built by: Caldwell and Co.
- Architect: Edward F. Neild
- Architectural style: Classical Revival
- NRHP reference No.: 98001079
- Added to NRHP: August 31, 1998

The Bossier High School on Colquitt Street in Bossier City in Bossier Parish, Louisiana was built in 1923 and 1928 and was listed on the National Register of Historic Places in 1998. It later became known as Bossier City Elementary School.

The listed property is a three block area which includes three buildings. The oldest is a two-story brick and stone building designed by architect Edward F. Neild in Classical Revival, built by Caldwell and Co. in 1923. A second contributing building is the similarly styled classroom building built in 1928 in front of the 1923 building. A third, non-contributing building, is a one-story brick gymnasium built in 1955.

The complex had a total of 36 classrooms and served all levels of schooling, despite its name suggesting that it would serve high school level only. The town had been growing rapidly, quadrupling in population from 1920 to 1930 and continuing to grow. The school complex was devoted to serving elementary school levels only from 1939 on, when a new high school also named "Bossier High School" and also now NRHP-listed, was built elsewhere in Bossier City.

== See also ==
- National Register of Historic Places listings in Bossier Parish, Louisiana
