= Bossier High School (Louisiana) =

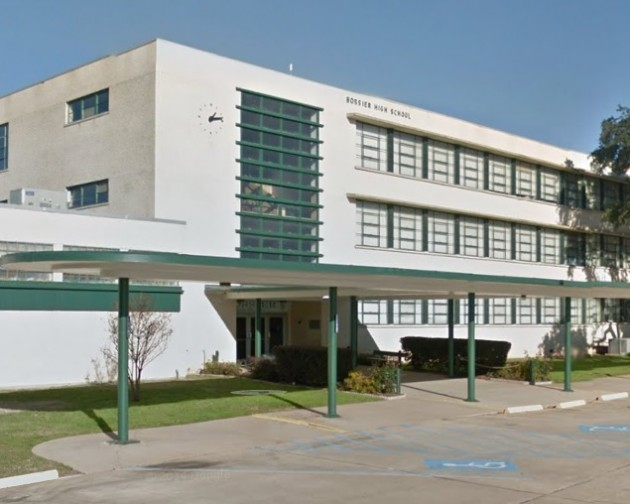

Location
- 777 Bearkat Drive; Bossier City, Louisiana 71111; United States

Information
- Type: Public school, college prep
- Motto: Lead All Students to Find Success
- Opened: 1917 (109 years ago)
- Principal: Billy Neill
- Staff: 49.64 (FTE)
- Grades: 9–12
- Gender: Co-ed
- Enrollment: 723 (2023–2024)
- Student to teacher ratio: 14.56
- Colors: Kelly green and white
- Athletics conference: LHSAA
- Mascot: Bearkat
- Nickname: Bearkats
- Newspaper: The Bossier Bear Facts
- Yearbook: Les Memoires
- Affiliation: Bossier Parish Schools
- Website: bossierh.bossierschools.org
- Bossier High School
- U.S. National Register of Historic Places
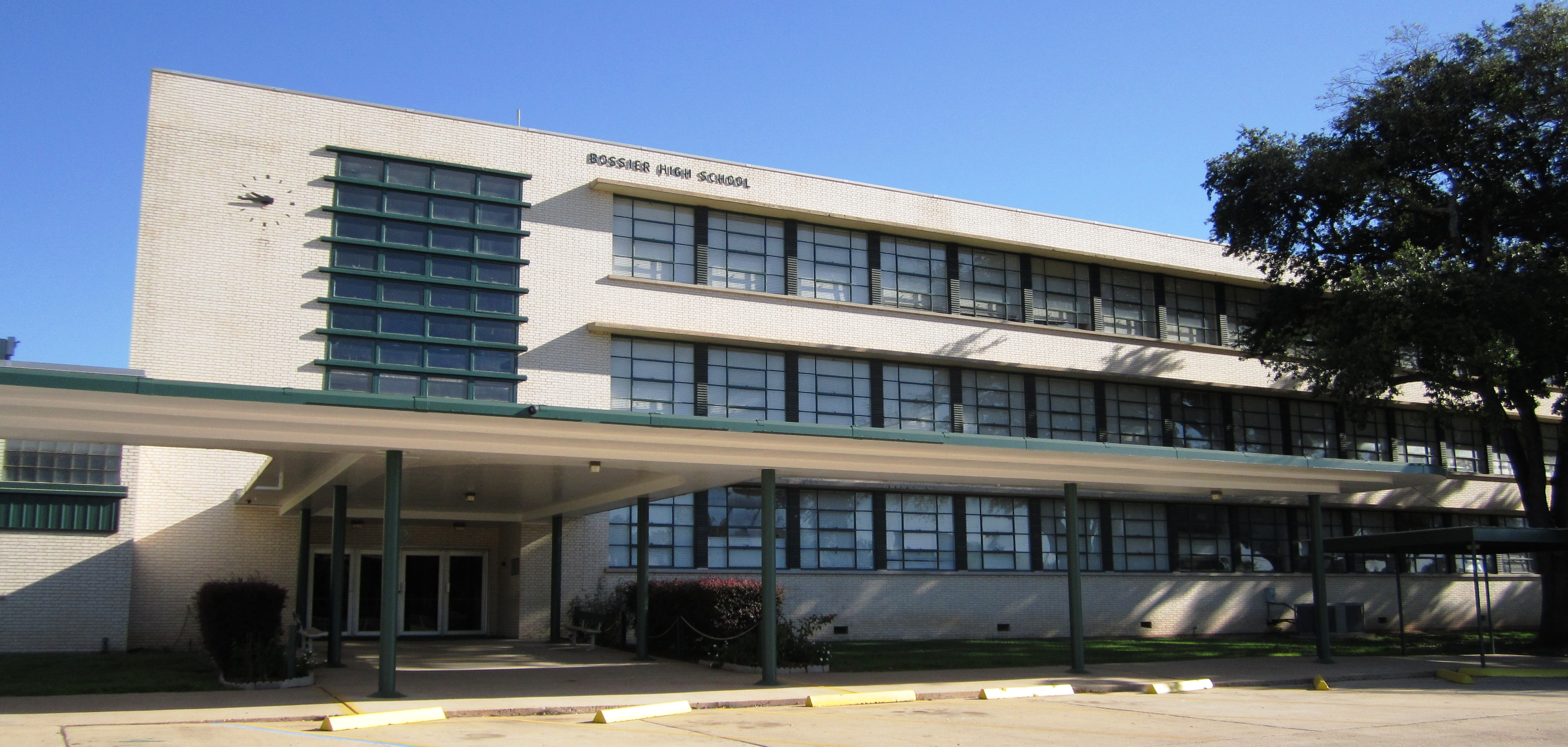

- Location within Louisiana
- Location: 777 Bearkat Drive, Bossier City, Louisiana
- Coordinates: 32°31′09″N 93°43′47″W
- Area: 3.5 acres (1.4 ha)
- Built: 1938-39
- Built by: James T. Taylor
- Architect: Samuel Wiener
- Architectural style: International Style
- NRHP reference No.: 04001078
- Added to NRHP: September 30, 2004

Bossier High School is a co-educational college preparatory high school in Bossier City, Louisiana, United States.

Its former building on Colquitt Street, a Classical Revival-style building constructed in 1923, was listed on the National Register of Historic Places in 1998 as Bossier High School (Colquitt Street). Its current location on Bearkat Drive, with its International Style architecture, also was listed on the National Register, in 2004.

The school's attendance boundary includes sections of Bossier City, a portion of Shreveport in Bossier Parish, and the Main Area of Barksdale Air Force Base.

== History ==
Bossier High School was officially recognized as an accredited educational institution by the Louisiana Department of Education in 1917. The first school was located on Traffic Street in North Bossier, the present site of Bossier Elementary School. In 1923 a new high school was built to serve the city's rapidly expanding population, and this was expanded in 1928, but still was inadequate. In 1938 a new location was chosen on the historic site of Fort Kirby Smith, a Civil War Fort. Fort Kirby Smith was one of several defensive positions pieced together by the Confederate Army during the American Civil War (1861-1865) to protect Shreveport during the Red River Campaign. According to Gary Joiner's Through the Howling Wilderness: The 1864 Red River Campaign and Union Failure in the West, it was located to prevent an attack from the north, the east, as well as the southeast from Union aggression. After the surrender of Shreveport in 1865, Fort Kirby Smith was dismantled and abandoned.

The present Bossier High School, a three-story building located at 777 Bearcat Drive, was built in 1938–39. It was listed on the National Register of Historic Places in 2004. It was designed by architect Samuel Wiener in International Style. Due to rapid population growth, the city's Bossier High School (Colquitt Street) built in 1923 and 1928 became over-crowded, and this school was built to replace it. The former school was then devoted to serving elementary school levels. It was built by contractor James T. Taylor of Fort Worth, Texas. The listing included three contributing buildings.

Construction of Bossier High was completed in 1940 and is the present site.

== Athletics ==
Bossier High athletics competes in the LHSAA. The school's biggest rivals include Airline High School and Parkway High School.

=== LHSAA state championships ===
Basketball championships

- (2) Boys – 2016, 2011

Football championships

- (2) 1942, 1948

== Notable alumni ==
- Hoffman Franklin Fuller, valedictorian, Class of 1950; inductee of the Bossier High Hall of Fame, 2009, tax scholar.
- Arlene Howell, (Eurlyne Howell when she attended BHS), actress and Miss USA 1958.
- Decamerion Richardson, NFL player for the Las Vegas Raiders
- Buddy Roemer, former U.S. Representative and Governor of Louisiana

== See also ==
- National Register of Historic Places listings in Bossier Parish, Louisiana
