= National Register of Historic Places listings in Lincoln Parish, Louisiana =

Location of Lincoln Parish in Louisiana

This is a list of the National Register of Historic Places listings in Lincoln Parish, Louisiana.

This is intended to be a complete list of the properties on the National Register of Historic Places in Lincoln Parish, Louisiana, United States. The locations of National Register properties for which the latitude and longitude coordinates are included below, may be seen in a map.

There are 31 properties listed on the National Register in the parish, and one formerly-listed property.

This National Park Service list is complete through NPS recent listings posted May 22, 2026.

== Current listings ==
	Name on the Register	Image	Date listed	Location	City or town	Description
1	Charles P. Adams House		February 23, 1996 (#96000145)	549 Main Street; 32°31′06″N 92°42′48″W	Grambling	
2	Autrey House	Autrey House	October 20, 1980 (#80001737)	Junction of LA 151 and LA 152, about 1.1 miles (1.8 km) west of Dubach, Louisiana; 32°42′03″N 92°40′31″W	Dubach	
3	Bogard Hall-Louisiana Tech University	Bogard Hall-Louisiana Tech University	February 20, 1998 (#98000119)	600 Dan Reneau Drive; 32°31′35″N 92°38′45″W	Ruston	
4	Calhoun Farmhouse		May 3, 1982 (#82002780)	2575 LA 821, about 5.5 miles (8.9 km) west of Ruston, Louisiana; 32°34′57″N 92°34′11″W	Ruston	
5	Dixie Theatre	Dixie Theatre	October 14, 1993 (#93001105)	212 North Vienna Street; 32°31′49″N 92°38′16″W	Ruston	
6	Downtown Ruston Historic District	Downtown Ruston Historic District	January 31, 2017 (#100000598)	Roughly bounded by North Monroe Street, West Alabama Avenue, East Alabama Avenue, North Bonner Street, East Railroad Avenue, South Vienna Street, West Texas Avenue, South Trenton Street and West Louisiana Avenue; 32°31′44″N 92°38′19″W	Ruston	
7	Dubach Commercial Historic District		May 26, 2026 (#100012344)	Roughly bounded by E. Hico Street, McMullin, and Boulevard Street; 32°41′57″N 92°39′34″W	Dubach	
8	Fred B. Dubach House		September 8, 1983 (#83000528)	7793 Annie Lee Street; 32°41′45″N 92°39′17″W	Dubach	
9	Federal Building	Federal Building	October 9, 1974 (#74000926)	201 North Vienna Street; 32°31′48″N 92°38′18″W	Ruston	
10	First Presbyterian Church	First Presbyterian Church	January 12, 1984 (#84001323)	212 North Bonner Street; 32°31′48″N 92°38′11″W	Ruston	
11	Gem Theater		March 27, 2025 (#100011577)	120 East Hico Street; 32°41′57″N 92°39′21″W	Dubach	
12	Grambling State University Historic District	Grambling State University Historic District	December 7, 2010 (#10000983)	Along Founder Avenue, between College Avenue and Central Avenue; 32°31′24″N 92°42′49″W	Grambling	
13	Hedgepeth Mounds		October 3, 2004 (#04001080)	Address restricted	Vienna	
14	Howard Auditorium-Louisiana Tech University	Howard Auditorium-Louisiana Tech University	February 20, 1998 (#98000113)	Corner of Adams Boulevard and Dan Reneau Drive; 32°31′36″N 92°38′49″W	Ruston	
15	T.L. James House		October 18, 1984 (#84000142)	504 North Vienna Street; 32°31′58″N 92°38′15″W	Ruston	
16	Keeny Hall-Louisiana Tech University	Keeny Hall-Louisiana Tech University	February 20, 1998 (#98000114)	Keeny Circle; 32°31′38″N 92°38′47″W	Ruston	
17	Kidd-Davis House		March 29, 1984 (#84001330)	609 North Vienna Street; 32°32′03″N 92°38′17″W	Ruston	
18	Lewis House		October 20, 1988 (#88002035)	210 East Alabama Avenue; 32°31′48″N 92°38′08″W	Ruston	
19	Meadows House		October 8, 1992 (#92001338)	508 North Bonner Street; 32°31′59″N 92°38′10″W	Ruston	
20	Prescott Memorial Library-Louisiana Tech University	Prescott Memorial Library-Louisiana Tech University	February 20, 1998 (#98000116)	Keeny Circle; 32°31′41″N 92°38′46″W	Ruston	
21	Reese Agriculture Building-Louisiana Tech University		February 20, 1998 (#98000118)	Reese Drive; 32°31′04″N 92°39′20″W	Ruston	
22	Robinson Hall-Louisiana Tech University	Robinson Hall-Louisiana Tech University	February 20, 1998 (#98000117)	Madison Avenue; 32°31′40″N 92°39′00″W	Ruston	
23	Ruston Central Fire Station	Ruston Central Fire Station	October 8, 1992 (#92001340)	200 East Mississippi Avenue; 32°31′45″N 92°38′11″W	Ruston	
24	Ruston High School	Ruston High School	October 8, 1992 (#92001335)	900 Bearcat Drive; 32°32′05″N 92°39′01″W	Ruston	
25	Ruston Power and Light Plant		July 8, 2019 (#100004151)	300 E. Mississippi Ave. 32°31′46″N 92°38′06″W	Ruston	
26	Ruston P.O.W. Camp Buildings		December 13, 1991 (#91001825)	In Grambling State University West Campus, 2776 LA 150; 32°32′05″N 92°44′27″W	Ruston	
27	Ruston State Bank	Ruston State Bank	November 2, 1990 (#90001730)	107 North Trenton Street; 32°31′45″N 92°38′22″W	Ruston	
28	Ruston USO		February 11, 2011 (#11000009)	212 North Trenton Street, Suite #1; 32°31′49″N 92°38′20″W	Ruston	
29	Toliver Dining Hall-Louisiana Tech University	Toliver Dining Hall-Louisiana Tech University	February 20, 1998 (#98000115)	Wisteria Street; 32°31′35″N 92°38′57″W	Ruston	
30	Townsend House		June 25, 1982 (#82002779)	410 North Bonner Street; 32°31′56″N 92°38′11″W	Ruston	
31	Walnut Creek Baptist Church		October 4, 1984 (#84000014)	End of Walnut Creek Church Road, about 1.64 miles (2.64 km) northwest of Simsboro; 32°33′10″N 92°48′25″W	Simsboro	

== Former listings ==
	Name on the Register	Image	Date listed	Date removed	Location	City or town	Description
1	Vicksburg, Shreveport and Pacific Depot	Vicksburg, Shreveport and Pacific Depot	October 8, 1992 (#92001337)	November 29, 2016	101 East Railroad Avenue; 32°31′42″N 92°38′16″W	Ruston	Buildings delisted after being demolished at uncertain date.

== See also ==
- List of National Historic Landmarks in Louisiana
- National Register of Historic Places listings in Louisiana
