= Earl Harrist =

American baseball player (1919–1998)

- Pitcher
- Born: April 20, 1919; Dubach, Louisiana, U.S.
- Died: September 7, 1998 (aged 79); Simsboro, Louisiana, U.S.
- Batted: Right Threw: Right

MLB debut
- August 18, 1945, for the Cincinnati Reds

Last MLB appearance
- June 18, 1953, for the Detroit Tigers

MLB statistics
- Win–loss record: 12–28
- Earned run average: 4.34
- Strikeouts: 162
- Stats at Baseball Reference

Teams
- Cincinnati Reds (1945); Chicago White Sox (1947–1948; Washington Senators (1948); St. Louis Browns (1952); Chicago White Sox (1953); Detroit Tigers (1953)

Earl "Irish" Harrist (April 20, 1919 – September 7, 1998) was an American Major League Baseball pitcher with the Cincinnati Reds, Chicago White Sox, Washington Senators, St. Louis Browns and the Detroit Tigers between 1945 and 1953. Harrist batted and threw right-handed. He was born in Dubach, Louisiana.

In five seasons, Harrist had a win–loss record of 12–28 in 132 games, started 24 games, 2 complete games, 50 games finished, 10 saves, 383 1/3 innings pitched, 391 hits allowed, 217 runs allowed, 185 earned runs allowed, 20 home runs allowed, 193 walks allowed, 162 strikeouts, 20 hit batsmen, 9 wild pitches, 1,705 batters faced and a 4.34 ERA. He led the American League in Hit Batsmen (10) in 1952.

Harrist died in Simsboro, Louisiana on September 7, 1998 at the age of 79.
