= Dubach (surname) =

Dubach is a surname. Notable people with the surname include:

- Alexandre Dubach (born 1955), Swiss violinist
- Ernst Dubach (1881–1982), Swiss racing cyclist

== See also ==
- Dubach, Louisiana, town in Lincoln Parish
- Fred B. Dubach House, historic house located in Dubach, Louisiana
