= Walnut Creek Baptist Church =

Historic church in Louisiana, United States

- U.S. National Register of Historic Places
- Location within Louisiana Location within the United States
- Location: End of Walnut Creek Church Road, about 1.64 miles (2.64 km) northwest of Simsboro
- Nearest city: Simsboro, Louisiana
- Coordinates: 32°33′10″N 92°48′25″W
- Area: 30 acres (12 ha)
- Built: c.1870
- Built by: Walnut Creek Baptist Church
- NRHP reference No.: 84000014
- Added to NRHP: October 4, 1984

The Walnut Creek Baptist Church is a historic church located at the end of Walnut Creek Church Road, about 1.64 miles (2.64 km) northwest of Simsboro, Louisiana, United States.

Built circa 1870, this well preserved country church is a four bay raised wooden structure. The cemetery, which is a contributing property to the historic church, was in use since the 1860s.

The church was added to the National Register of Historic Places on October 4, 1984.

== See also ==
- National Register of Historic Places listings in Lincoln Parish, Louisiana
