= Dixie Garr =

American computer engineer

Dixie Tyran Garr
- Born: Dubach, Louisiana
- Education: Grambling State University; University of California, Los Angeles
- Employer(s): Cisco Systems; Texas Instruments

Dixie Tyran Garr (born 1956) is an American computer engineer who served as Vice President at Cisco Systems and Head of Software Engineering at Texas Instruments.

== Early life and education ==
Garr was born in Dubach, Louisiana. She was the youngest of her eight brothers and sisters, and graduated top of her class. She graduated summa cum laude with a degree in computer science from Grambling State University in 1975. During her college degree she interned at General Motors. She was a graduate student at University of California, Los Angeles, where she worked as a Hughes Aircraft Company Fellow. She earned a PhD in computer science and engineering, before joining Hughes Aircraft Company as an engineer.

== Career ==
Garr moved to Texas Instruments in 1981.

Garr worked at TI for almost twenty years. She held several leadership positions at TI, including advanced development manager, manager of the Information Technology group and manager of digital imaging. She was the first African-American Level 3 Director of software engineering at TI. At TI Garr launched a minority leadership program that included guest speakers, a sponsorship scheme and professional development for people from minoritised backgrounds. In 1997 Garr was named the "Black Engineer of the Year in Industry" by the council of engineering deans at historically black colleges and universities. She attended the Stanford University Executive Program. Garr returned to TI to lead the engineering teams working on programmes in defence and communications.

In 1998 Garr was recruited by Cisco Systems. At Cisco Garr led teams that looked after customer satisfaction and corporate quality.
