= Lewis House (Ruston, Louisiana) =

Historic house in Louisiana, United States

- U.S. National Register of Historic Places
- Location within Louisiana Location within the United States
- Location: 210 East Alabama Avenue, Ruston, Louisiana
- Coordinates: 32°31′48″N 92°38′08″W
- Area: less than one acre
- Built: 1902
- Architectural style: Queen Anne Revival, Colonial Revival
- NRHP reference No.: 88002035
- Added to NRHP: October 20, 1988

The Lewis House is a historic house located at 210 East Alabama Avenue in Ruston, Louisiana, United States. It now hosts the Lewis House Victorian Bed & Breakfast, Gift Shoppe, and Tea Room.

Built in 1902 for W.J. Lewis, the building is a two-story frame house in a mixed Queen Anne Revival-Colonial Revival style. The house was home to Lewis family until 1987, when it was purchased and restored by Colvin family. It was subsequently used as an antique shop.

The house was listed on the National Register of Historic Places on October 20, 1988.

== See also ==
- National Register of Historic Places listings in Lincoln Parish, Louisiana
