= Grambling State University Historic District =

Historic district in Louisiana, United States

- U.S. National Register of Historic Places
- U.S. Historic district
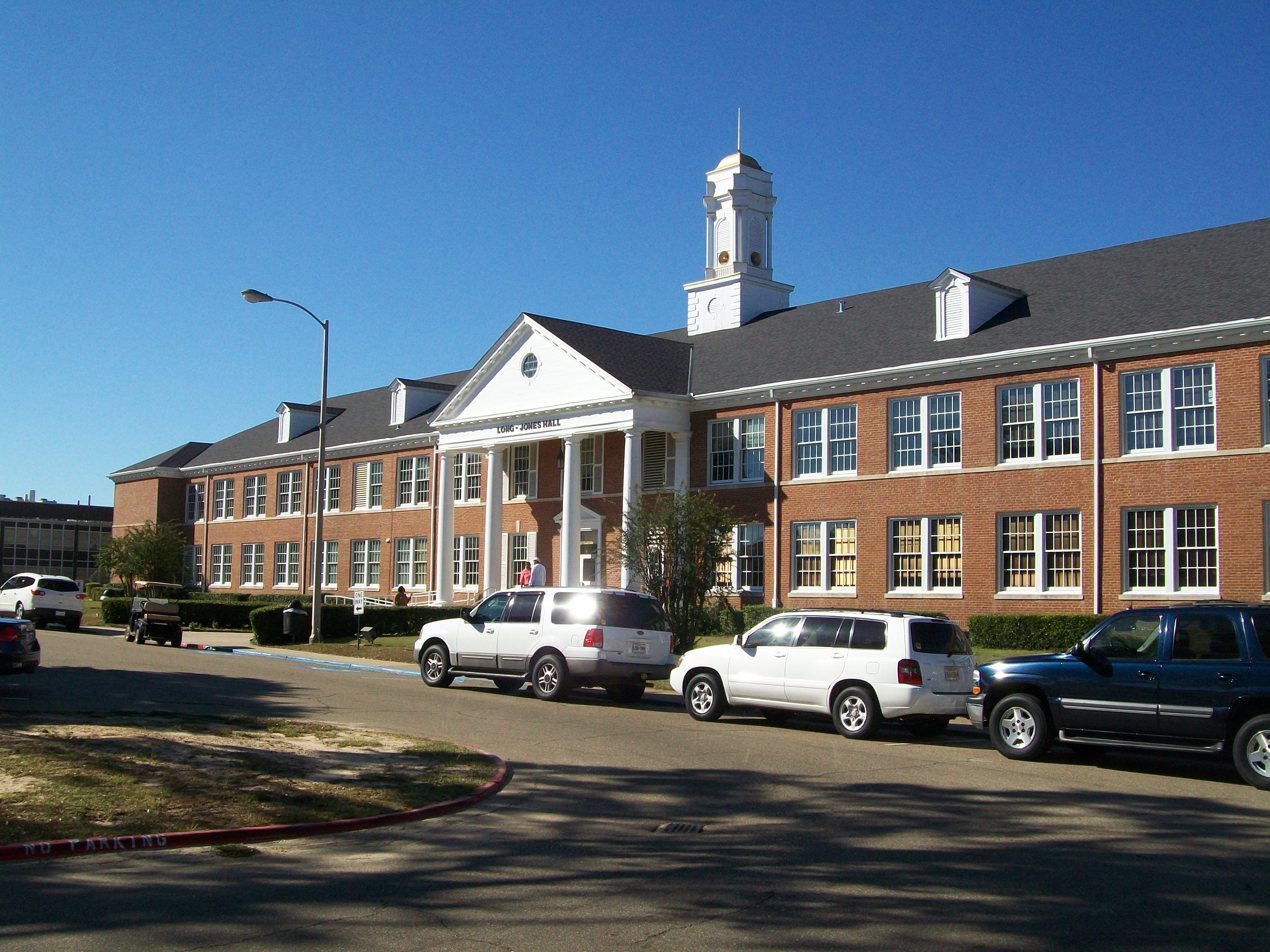
- Long Hall, now Long-Jones Hall

- Location within Louisiana Location within the United States
- Location: Along Founder Avenue, between College Avenue and Central Avenue, Grambling, Louisiana
- Coordinates: 32°31′24″N 92°42′49″W
- NRHP reference No.: 10000983
- Added to NRHP: December 7, 2010

The Grambling State University Historic District is a historic district located in Grambling State University campus, in Grambling, Louisiana.

The district area includes 16 contributing buildings and 5 non-contributing buildings. The district comprises school structures built between 1939 and 1960, with styles including Colonial Revival, Modern Movement and International Style.

The district was listed on the National Register of Historic Places on December 7, 2010.

== Contributing properties ==
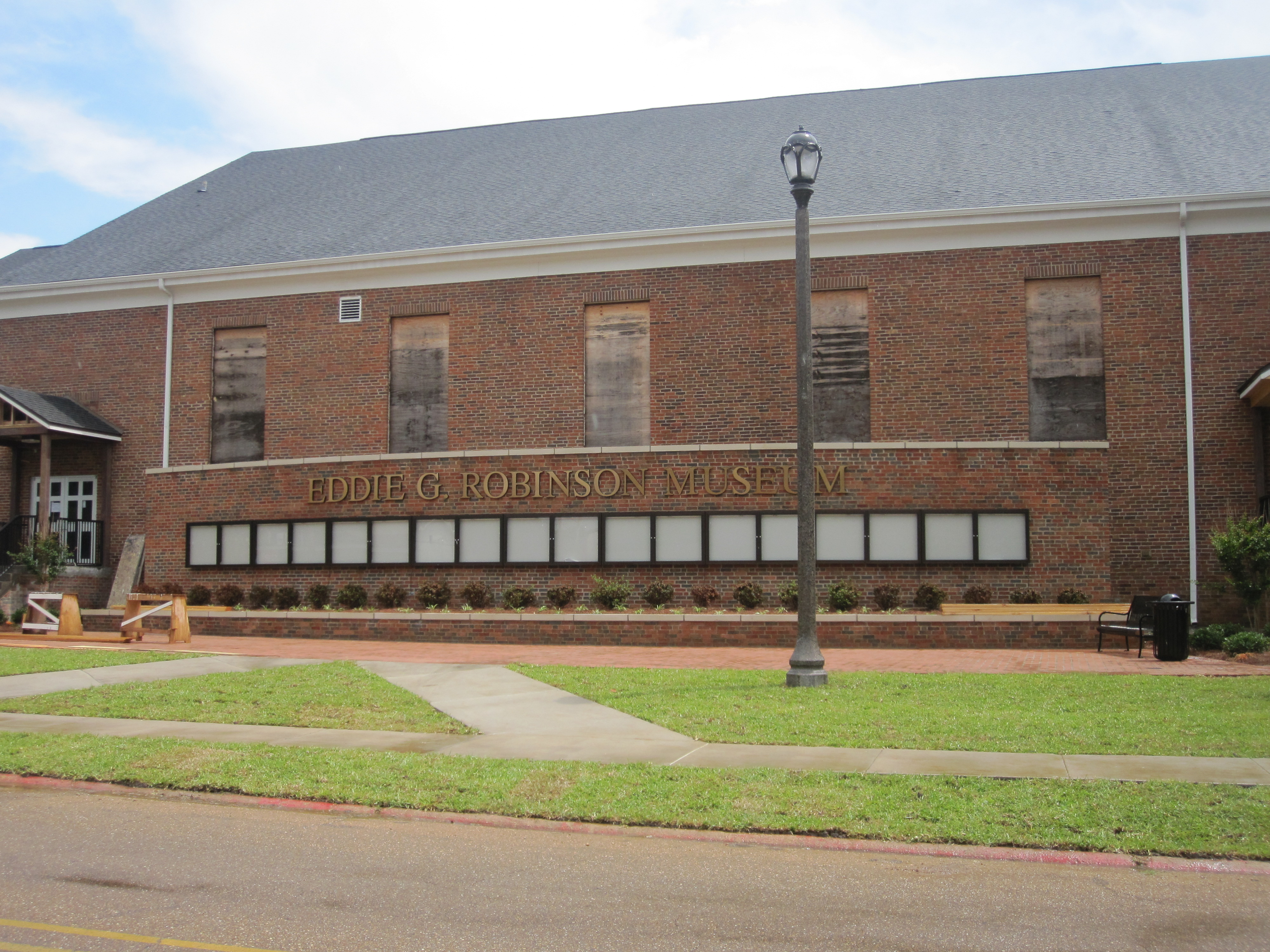
Old Gym and Auditorium building, now Eddie G. Robinson Museum

- Long Hall, now Long-Jones Hall, 32°31′31″N 92°42′55″W, built 1939.
- Gym and Auditorium, now Eddie G. Robinson Museum, 32°31′33″N 92°42′53″W, built 1939.
- Lee Hall, 32°31′32″N 92°42′50″W, built 1939.
- Jewett Hall, 32°31′28″N 92°42′54″W, built 1939.
- Dunbar Hall, 32°31′32″N 92°42′43″W, built 1956.
- Gymnasium/Physical Education Building, 32°31′27″N 92°42′45″W, built 1954.
- Auditorium, 32°31′28″N 92°42′47″W, built 1960.
- Science Building, now Carver Hall, 32°31′27″N 92°42′57″W, built 1958.
- James Hall, 32°31′26″N 92°42′53″W, built 1956.
- Dining Hall, 32°31′26″N 92°42′51″W, built 1960.
- Brown Hall, 32°31′20″N 92°42′52″W, built 1956.
- President's House, now Student Judicial Affairs, 32°31′20″N 92°42′48″W, built c.1950.
- Female Faculty Housing, now University Police, 32°31′19″N 92°42′47″W, built 1943.
- Infirmary, now Foster Johnson Center, 32°31′19″N 92°42′46″W, built 1943.
- Natatorium, 32°31′23″N 92°42′44″W, built 1958.
- Athletic Department, 32°31′25″N 92°42′45″W, built 1954.

== See also ==
- National Register of Historic Places listings in Lincoln Parish, Louisiana
- Grambling State University
