= T. L. James House =

Historic house in Louisiana, United States

- U.S. National Register of Historic Places
- Location within Louisiana Location within the United States
- Location: 504 North Vienna Street, Ruston, Louisiana
- Coordinates: 32°31′58″N 92°38′15″W
- Area: 0.66 acres (0.27 ha)
- Built: 1926
- Built by: T. L. James
- Architectural style: Colonial Revival, Italianate
- NRHP reference No.: 84000142
- Added to NRHP: October 18, 1984

The T. L. James House is a historic house located at 504 North Vienna Street in Ruston, Louisiana.

Originally built in 1884 by Colonel Thomas Cunningham Standifer, which purchased the land from Robert E. Russ, the property was purchased by T. L. James in 1913 and the house was completely remodeled in 1926. The building is a two-story frame residence, showing Colonial Revival and late Italianate elements. Some of the original 1884 features are still visible, including the two chimneys, the rear gallery columns and the basic plan, including the polygonal bay. A five bay garage dating from 1926 is present at the back of the house and is considered a contributing property.

The house was listed on the National Register of Historic Places on October 18, 1984.

== See also ==
- National Register of Historic Places listings in Lincoln Parish, Louisiana
