= Townsend House (Ruston, Louisiana) =

Historic house in Louisiana, United States

- U.S. National Register of Historic Places
- Location within Louisiana Location within the United States
- Location: 410 North Bonner Street, Ruston, Louisiana
- Coordinates: 32°31′56″N 92°38′11″W
- Area: 0.21 acres (0.085 ha)
- Built: c.1885
- Architectural style: Queen Anne Revival
- NRHP reference No.: 82002779
- Added to NRHP: June 25, 1982

The Townsend House is a historic house located at 410 North Bonner Street in Ruston, Louisiana, United States.

Originally built in Vienna, Louisiana between c.1885 and 1890, the house is a Queen Anne Revival frame clapboard residence. According to Lincoln Parish Museum and Historical Society, the builindg is the second oldest structure standing in Ruston, and also one of only two buildings which were moved into Ruston from Vienna when the town became the parish seat. The house was acquired by the Baptist Church of Christ of Ruston in 1890 and was used as a parsonage until 1908, when it was purchased by T.B. Meadows. In August 1920 it became the house of H.E. Townsend, which lived there until his death in 1978.

The house, actually hosting a gift shop, was listed on the National Register of Historic Places on October 8, 1992.

== See also ==
- National Register of Historic Places listings in Lincoln Parish, Louisiana
