= Kidd-Davis House =

Historic building in Louisiana

- U.S. National Register of Historic Places
- Location within Louisiana Location within the United States
- Location: 609 North Vienna Street, Ruston, Louisiana
- Coordinates: 32°32′03″N 92°38′17″W
- Area: 0.5 acres (0.20 ha)
- Built: 1886
- Built by: Charles H. Harris
- Architectural style: Colonial Revival, Italianate
- NRHP reference No.: 84001330
- Added to NRHP: March 29, 1984

The Kidd-Davis House, now hosting the Lincoln Parish Museum & Historical Society, is a historic house located at 609 North Vienna Street in Ruston, Louisiana, United States.

Built in 1886 by Charles H. Harris, the structure is a 1 1/2-story Italianate frame house remodeled in Colonial Revival style in c.1920. The property was originally purchased by Leroy Madison Kidd in 1885 from Robert E. Russ, and then sold to Charles H. Harris in 1886. Shortly after its construction, the house was sold to Captain Milton B. Kidd. In 1921 the property was purchased by Robert Wesley Davis.

The house was listed on the National Register of Historic Places on March 29, 1984.

The Kidd-Davis house is now hosting the Lincoln Parish Museum & Historical Society, which also runs the Autrey House Museum, located in another enlisted historical property.

== See also ==
- National Register of Historic Places listings in Lincoln Parish, Louisiana
- Autrey House
