= Meadows House =

Historic house in Louisiana, United States

- U.S. National Register of Historic Places
- Location within Louisiana Location within the United States
- Location: 508 North Bonner Street, Ruston, Louisiana
- Coordinates: 32°31′59″N 92°38′10″W
- Area: 1.5 acres (0.61 ha)
- Built: c.1900
- Architectural style: Queen Anne Revival, Eastlake
- NRHP reference No.: 92001338
- Added to NRHP: October 8, 1992

The Meadows House is a historic house located at 508 North Bonner Street in Ruston, Louisiana, United States.

Built in c.1900, the house is a 1 1/2-story frame residence with Queen Anne Revival and Eastlake elements. The present house is the enlargement of a previous smaller residence dating to c.1890. The building features an Eastlake front gallery connecting the two projecting porches on each side.

The house was listed on the National Register of Historic Places on October 8, 1992.

== See also ==
- National Register of Historic Places listings in Lincoln Parish, Louisiana
