= Fred B. Dubach House =

Historic house in Louisiana, United States

- U.S. National Register of Historic Places
- Location within Louisiana Location within the United States
- Location: 7793 Annie Lee Street, Dubach, Louisiana
- Coordinates: 32°41′45″N 92°39′17″W
- Area: 0.2 acres (0.081 ha)
- Built: c.1900
- Built by: Fred B. Dubach
- Architectural style: Queen Anne Revival, Colonial Revival
- NRHP reference No.: 83000528
- Added to NRHP: September 8, 1983

The Fred B. Dubach House is a historic house located at 7793 Annie Lee Street in Dubach, Louisiana.

Built c.1900 by Fred B. Dubach, founder of the town of Dubach, the house is a two-story frame residence in Queen Anne Revival-Colonial Revival style. In 1899 Fred B. Dubach founded the Dubach Lumber Company and his house was built shortly after, directly across the road from his lumber mill.

The house was listed on the National Register of Historic Places on September 8, 1983.

== See also ==
- National Register of Historic Places listings in Lincoln Parish, Louisiana
