= Autrey House =

Historic house in Louisiana, United States

- U.S. National Register of Historic Places
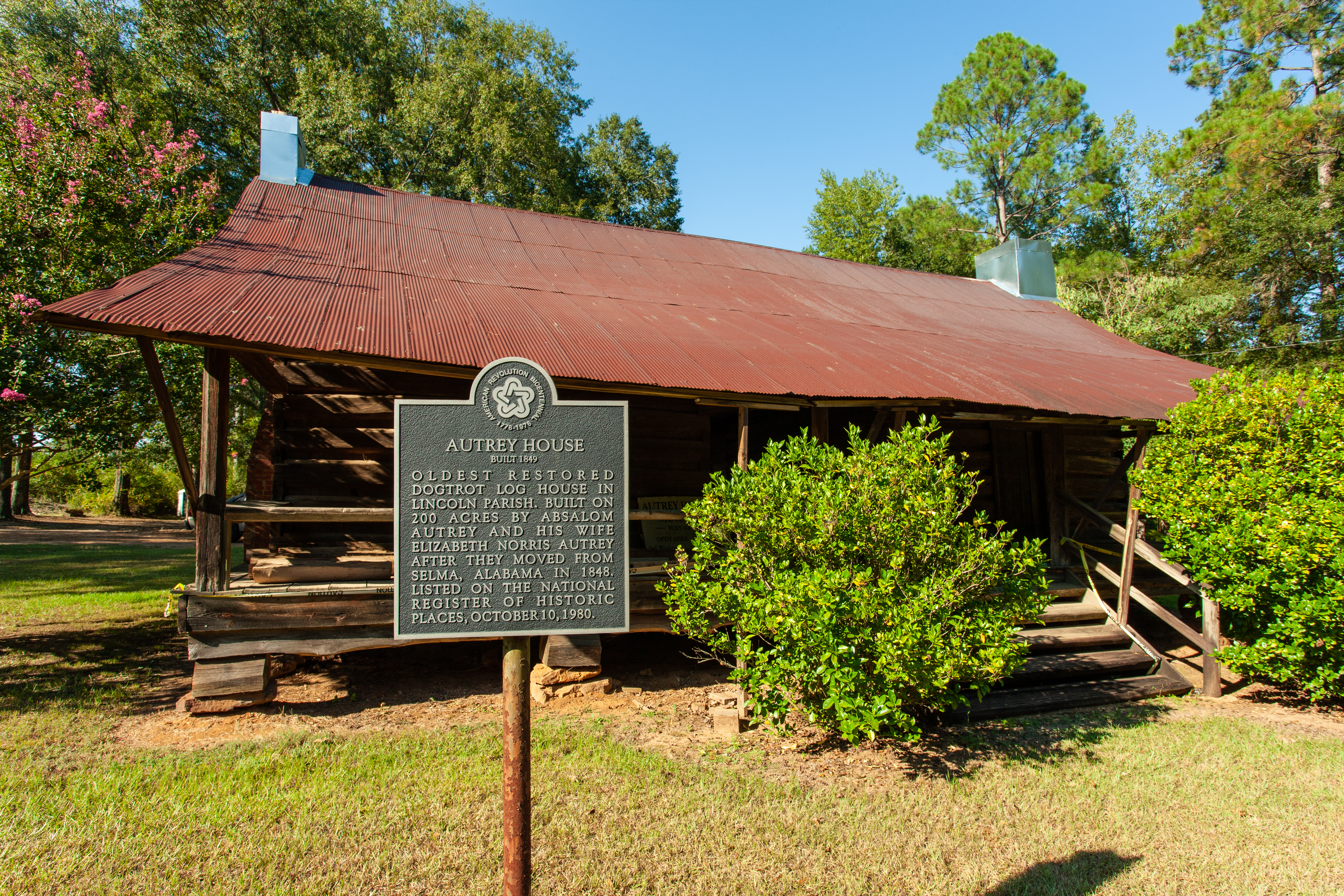

- Location within Louisiana Location within the United States
- Location: Junction of LA 151 and LA 152, about 1.1 miles (1.8 km) west of Dubach, Louisiana
- Coordinates: 32°42′03″N 92°40′31″W
- Area: 1.67 acres (0.68 ha)
- Built: 1849
- Built by: Absalom Autrey
- Architectural style: Dogtrot house
- NRHP reference No.: 80001737
- Added to NRHP: October 20, 1980

The Autrey House, now hosting the Autrey House Museum, is a historic house located at the junction of LA 151 and LA 152, about 1.1 miles (1.8 km) west of Dubach, Louisiana.

Built in 1849 by Absalom Autrey, the house is a rare example of dog trot house, as less than ten of these houses still remain in Louisiana.

The house was listed on the National Register of Historic Places on October 20, 1980.

The historical building is now hosting the Autrey House Museum, a satellite property of Lincoln Parish Museum & Historical Society, which is located in the enlisted Kidd-Davis House.

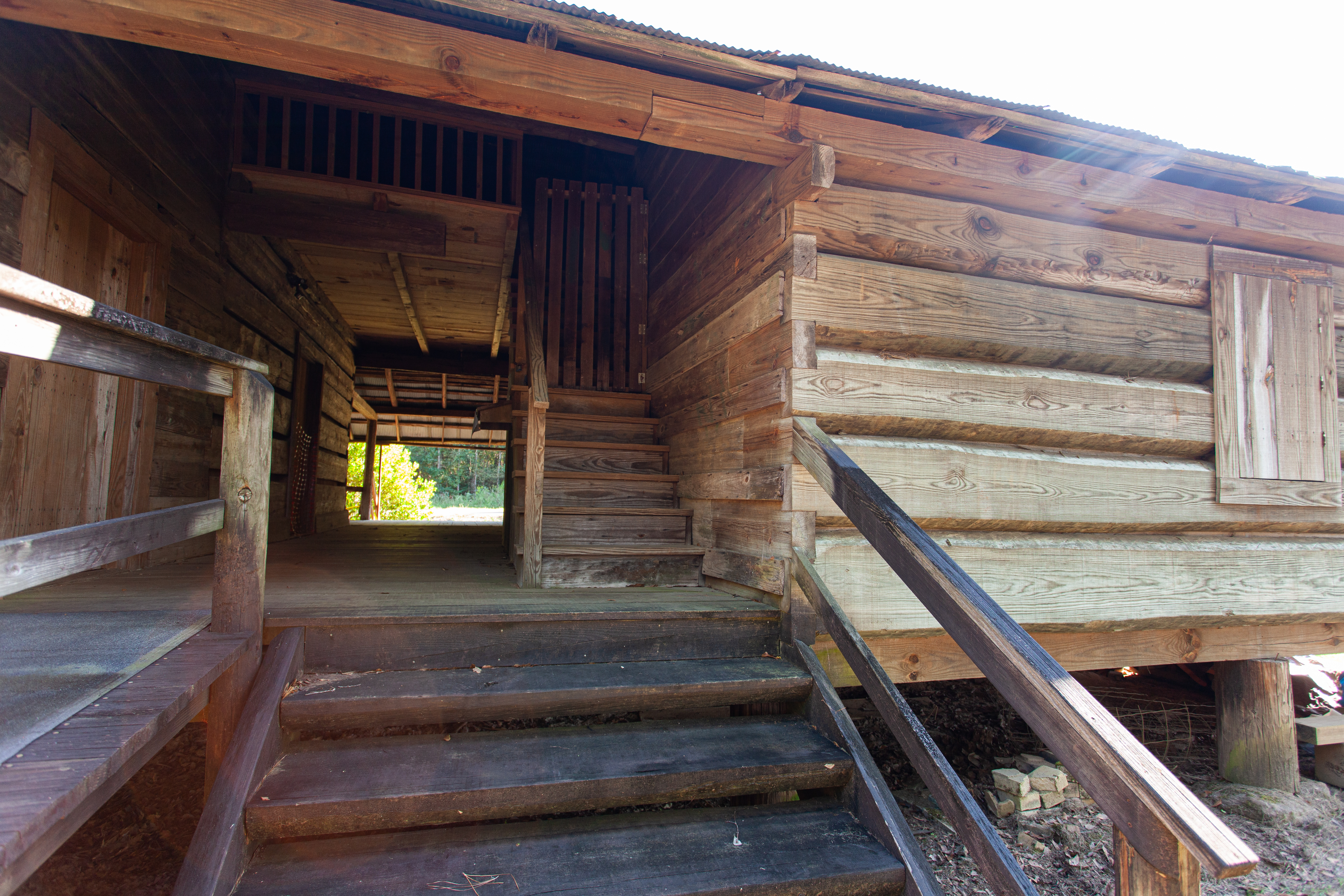
Looking through the central breezeway in the Autrey House that is typical of dog trot houses.

== See also ==
- National Register of Historic Places listings in Lincoln Parish, Louisiana
- Kidd-Davis House
