= First Presbyterian Church (Ruston, Louisiana) =

Historic church in Louisiana, United States

- U.S. National Register of Historic Places
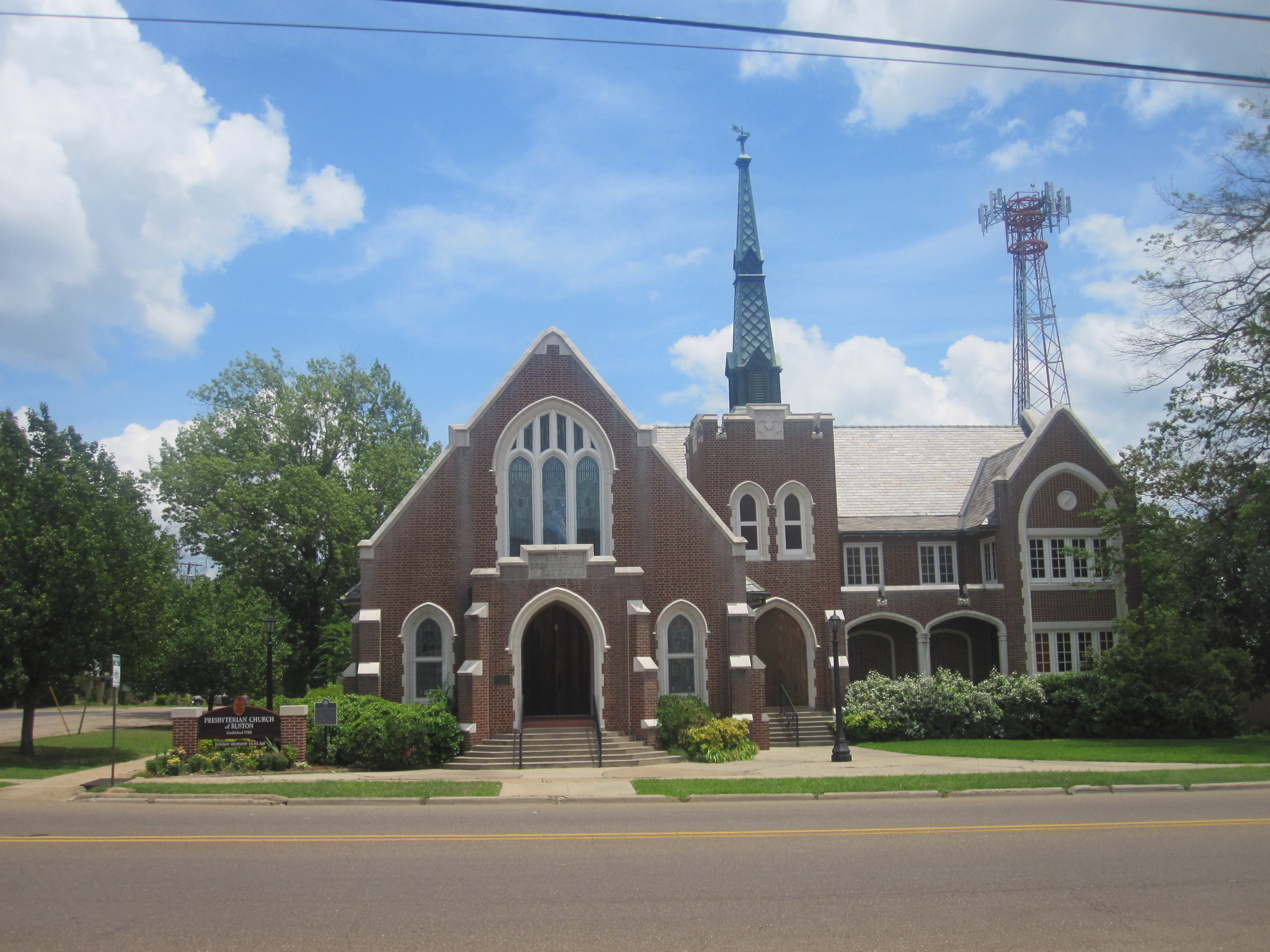

- Location within Louisiana Location within the United States
- Location: 212 North Bonner Street, Ruston, Louisiana
- Coordinates: 32°31′48″N 92°38′11″W
- Area: 1 acre (0.40 ha)
- Built: 1923-24
- Built by: C.C. Davis
- Architect: C.E. Olscher
- Architectural style: Late Gothic Revival
- NRHP reference No.: 84001323
- Added to NRHP: January 12, 1984

The First Presbyterian Church is a Late Gothic Revival-style basilica plan historic church located at 212 North Bonner Street in Ruston, Louisiana.

Built in 1923–24, its walls are Flemish bond brick trimmed with limestone. It has a side tower with a crenelated top and a needled spire made of sheet metal. It a crenellated porch topped by a lancet window.

The church was added to the National Register of Historic Places on January 12, 1984.

== See also ==
- National Register of Historic Places listings in Lincoln Parish, Louisiana
