= Ruston Central Fire Station =

- U.S. National Register of Historic Places
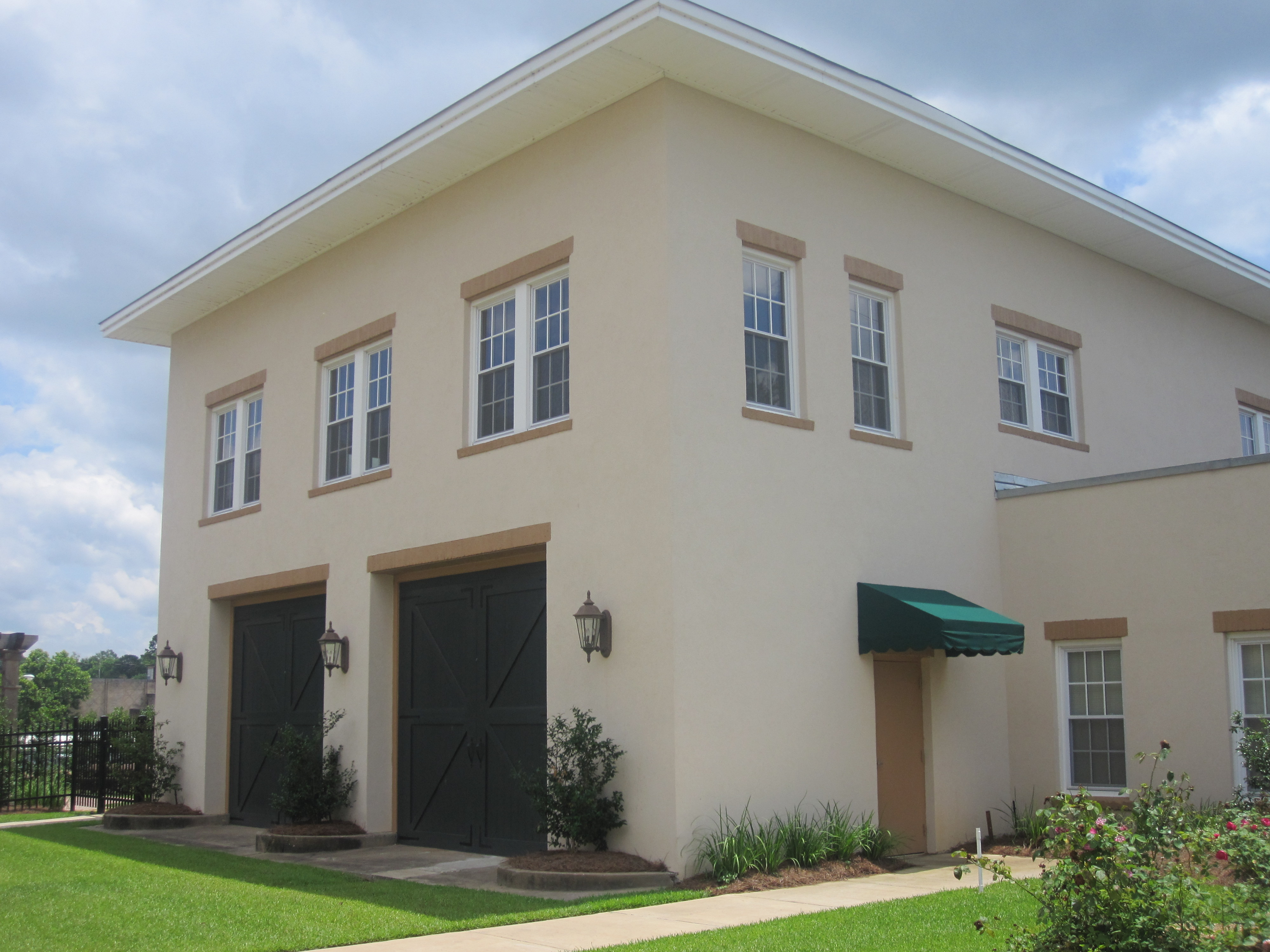

- Location within Louisiana Location within the United States
- Location: 200 East Mississippi Avenue, Ruston, Louisiana
- Coordinates: 32°31′45″N 92°38′11″W
- Area: less than one acre
- Built: 1926
- NRHP reference No.: 92001340
- Added to NRHP: October 8, 1992

The Ruston Central Fire Station is a historic fire station located at 200 East Mississippi Avenue in Ruston, Louisiana, United States.

Originally built in 1926, the two-story stucco over concrete structure was expanded in 1945 with the addition of a one-story side wing which did not alter its overall style and look.

The building was listed on the National Register of Historic Places on October 8, 1992.

== See also ==
- National Register of Historic Places listings in Lincoln Parish, Louisiana
