= Calhoun Farmhouse =

Historic house in Louisiana, United States

- U.S. National Register of Historic Places
- Location within Louisiana Location within the United States
- Location: 2575 LA 821, about 5.5 miles (8.9 km) west of Ruston, Louisiana
- Coordinates: 32°34′57″N 92°34′11″W
- Area: 0.2 acres (0.081 ha)
- Built: c.1880
- Architectural style: Italianate
- NRHP reference No.: 82002780
- Added to NRHP: May 3, 1982

The Calhoun Farmhouse is a historic house located at 2575 LA 821, about 5.5 miles (8.9 km) west of Ruston, Louisiana, USA.

Built around 1880 on a parcel owned by Mrs. John D. Calhoun, the house is a frame residence in Italianate style. Around 1890, a rear kitchen service wing was added, transforming the L-shaped building into a U-shaped one. A few minor alterations were made in 1952 and 1960, which included the enclosure of rear galleries and the addition of a carport, which is considered a non-contributing structure.

The house was listed on the National Register of Historic Places on May 3, 1982.

== See also ==
- National Register of Historic Places listings in Lincoln Parish, Louisiana
