= Grambling State University =

Public university in Grambling, Louisiana, U.S.

- Former names: Colored Industrial and Agricultural School (1901–1905); North Louisiana Agricultural and Industrial School (1905–1928); Louisiana Negro Normal and Industrial Institute (1928–1946); Grambling College (1946–1974)
- Motto: Where Everybody Is Somebody
- Type: Public historically Black university
- Established: 1901
- Parent institution: UL System
- Academic affiliations: Space-grant
- Endowment: $7 million
- President: Martin Lemelle
- Provost: Connie Walton
- Students: 5,232
- Location: Grambling, Louisiana, United States; 32.5252°N 92.7153°W
- Campus: Rural
- Newspaper: The Gramblinite
- Colors: Black & gold
- Nickname: Tigers
- Sporting affiliations: NCAA Division I FCS – SWAC
- Website: www.gram.edu

Grambling State University (GSU, Grambling, or Grambling State) is a public historically black university in Grambling, Louisiana, United States. Grambling State is home of the Eddie G. Robinson Museum and is listed on the Louisiana African American Heritage Trail. Grambling State is a member-school of the University of Louisiana System and Thurgood Marshall College Fund.

Grambling State's athletic teams compete in Division I of the National Collegiate Athletic Association and are known as the Grambling State Tigers. Grambling State is a member of the Southwestern Athletic Conference.

== History ==
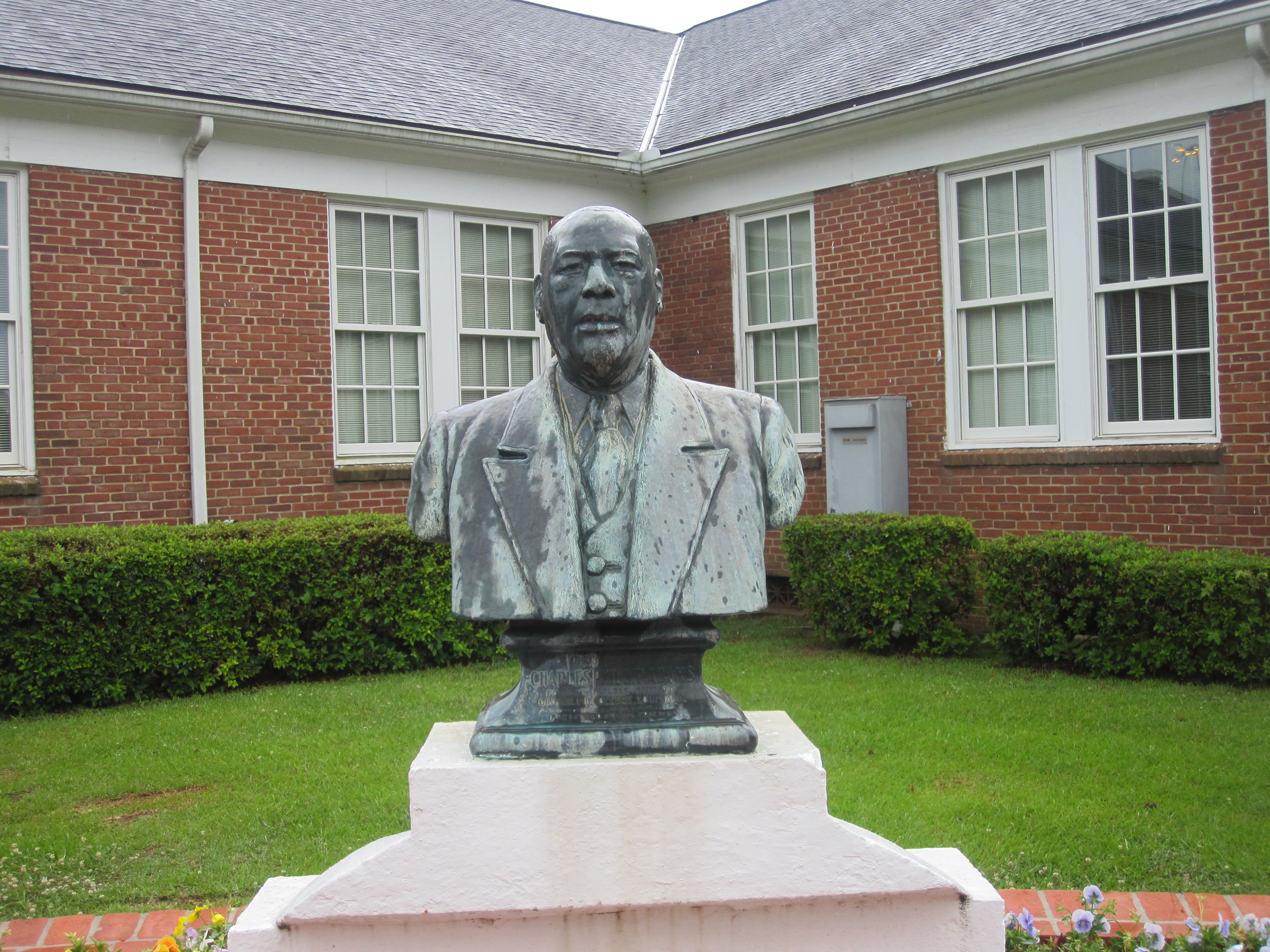
Bust of Charles P. Adams, the founder and first president of Grambling State University

Grambling State University developed from the desire of African-American farmers in rural north Louisiana who wanted to educate other African Americans. In 1896, the North Louisiana Colored Agriculture Relief Association led by Lafayette Richmond was formed to organize and operate a school. After opening a small school west of what is now the town of Grambling, the Association requested assistance from Booker T. Washington of Tuskegee Institute in Alabama. Charles P. Adams, sent to aid the group in organizing an industrial school, became its founder and first president.

Under Adams' leadership, the Colored Industrial and Agricultural School opened on November 1, 1901. Four years later, the school moved to its present location and was renamed as the North Louisiana Agricultural and Industrial School. By 1928, the school was able to offer two-year professional certificates and diplomas after becoming a state junior college. The school was renamed Louisiana Negro Normal and Industrial Institute.

In 1936, the program was reorganized to emphasize rural education. It became known as "The Louisiana Plan" or "A Venture in Rural Teacher Education". Professional teaching certificates were awarded when a third year was added in 1936, and the first baccalaureate degree was awarded in 1944 in elementary education. The institution's name was changed to Grambling College in 1946 to match the name of the community, which had been named because of a sawmill in the community, owned by P. G. Grambling, a white man that leased property from the black land owners. Thereafter, the college prepared secondary teachers and added curricula in sciences, liberal arts and business. With these programs in effect, the school was transformed from a single purpose institution of teacher education into a multi-purpose college.

In 1949, the college was accredited by the Southern Association of Colleges and Schools (SACS). The Grambling science building is one of twenty-six public structures in Louisiana constructed by the prominent contractor George A. Caldwell.

In 1974, the addition of graduate programs in education allowed the college to be granted university status under its present name, Grambling State University.

From 1977 to 2000, the university grew and prospered. Several new academic programs were incorporated. New facilities were added to the 384-acre (155-hectare) campus, including a business and computer science building, school of nursing, student services building, stadium, stadium support facility, and an intramural sports center.

In May 1999, President Clinton served as the commencement keynote speaker.

State Representative George B. Holstead of Ruston worked to increase state appropriations for Grambling State University during his legislative tenure from 1964 to 1980.

On December 7, 2010, the Grambling State University Historic District, an area comprising 16 buildings dating from 1939 to 1960, was added to the National Register of Historic Places.

In 2019, Grambling broke ground for building of the first digital library on a HBCU campus. The $16.6 million project was completed in 2024.

=== Presidents ===
1. Charles P. Adams (1901–1936) – first president of the university
2. Ralph Waldo Emerson Jones
3. Joseph Benjamin Johnson - first GSU alumnus to serve as president
4. Harold W. Lundy
5. Raymond Hicks
6. Leonard Haynes III
7. Steve A. Favors
8. Neari Francois Warner – first female president
9. Horace Judson
10. Frank Pogue
11. Cynthia S. Warrick
12. Willie Larkin
13. Richard J. Gallot, Jr.
14. Martin Lemelle – current president and GSU alumnus

== Academics ==
Academic rankings

Master's
- Washington Monthly: 125 of 603

Regional
- U.S. News & World Report: 99 (tie) of 136

Grambling State University offers undergraduate and graduate degrees through the following four colleges:

- College of Art & Sciences
- College of Business
- College of Educational and Graduate Studies
- College of Professional Studies

Grambling State University offers two doctoral degree programs, one in Developmental Education and one in Criminology and Justice Administration.

In 2020, Grambling State University became the first collegiate institution in Louisiana to offer bachelor's degrees in cybersecurity and cloud computing.

== Student life ==
Undergraduate demographics as of fall 2023
Race and ethnicity	Total
Black	93%
Two or more races	3%
Hispanic	2%
International student	2%
Economic diversity
Low-income (Note: The percentage of students who received an income-based federal Pell grant intended for low-income students.)	74%
Affluent (Note: The percentage of students who are a part of the American middle class at the bare minimum.)	26%

=== Athletics ===
GSU athletics logo

The Grambling Tigers represent Grambling State University in NCAA intercollegiate athletics. Grambling's sports teams participate in NCAA Division I (Football Championship Subdivision for football) in the Southwestern Athletic Conference (SWAC). Currently, the Grambling State University Department of Athletics sponsors men's intercollegiate football, along with men's and women's basketball, baseball, track & field, softball, golf, soccer, tennis, bowling and volleyball.

Grambling State's most notable rivals are their south Louisiana foe Southern, Prairie View A&M, Jackson State, and Alcorn State.

=== Student body ===
As of 2022, approximately 40% of GSU's student body is from outside Louisiana; Texas, California, and Illinois are the three largest feeder states. 65% of the student body is female, and 35% is male. 93% of the student body identify as black, and 7% identify as non-black.

=== GSU Tiger Marching Band ===
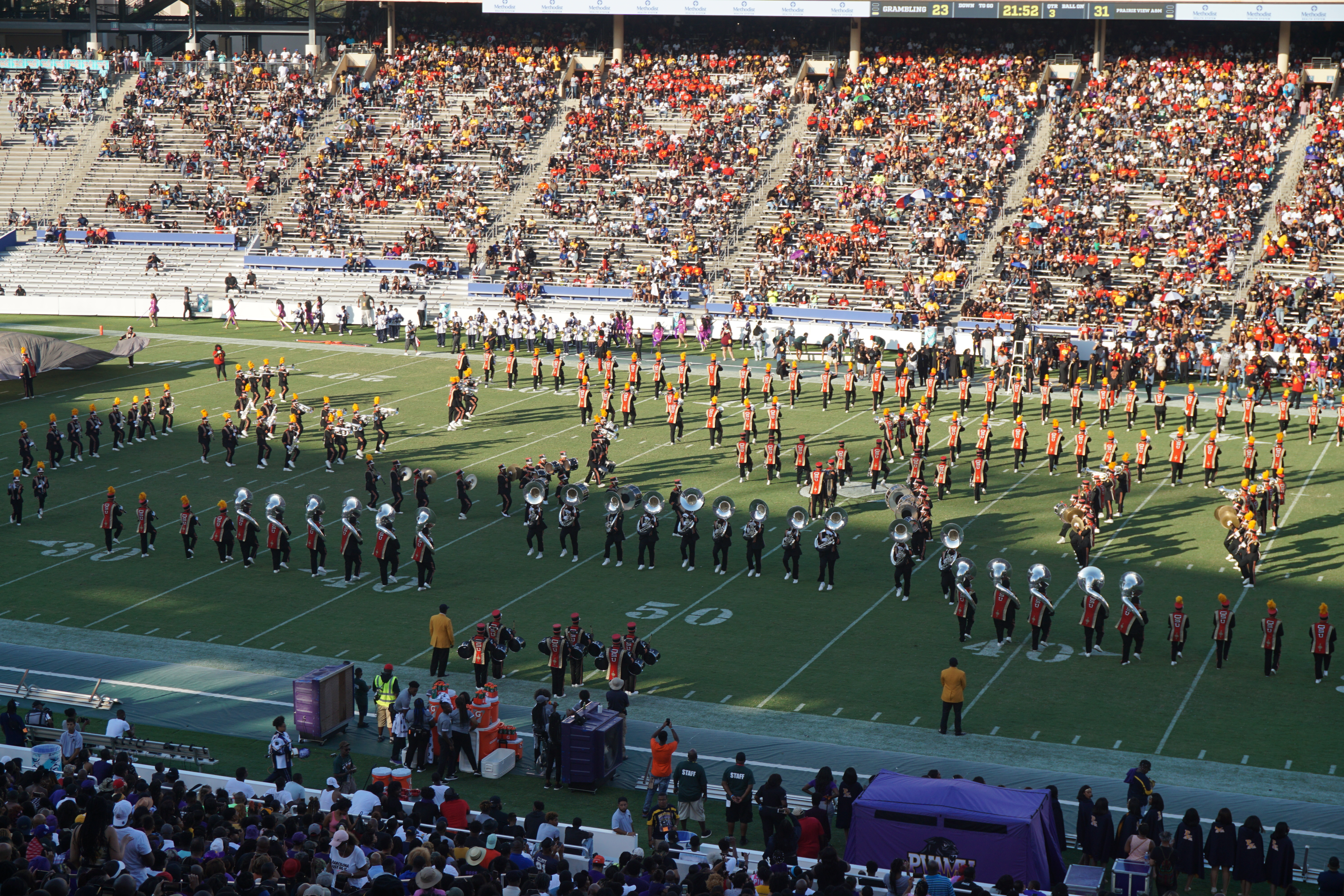
The World Famed Tiger Marching Band performing at the 2019 State Fair Classic

The GSU Tiger Marching Band, also known as "The World Famed Tiger Marching Band", is a historic marching band. They are the only HBCU marching band in the nation to perform at two consecutive U.S. presidential inaugurations. "World Famed" was founded in 1926 and serves as one of the premier ambassadors of the university.

=== Campus media ===
- The Gramblinite is the university's weekly student newspaper that is consistently awarded for excellent journalism.
- KGRM Tiger Radio 91.5 FM is a 24-hour student-run radio station that provides a variety of music, news, sports and public affairs programming.
- The GSU-TV Media Center is operated by the Department of Mass Communications to train students interested in broadcasting careers.

== Gallery ==
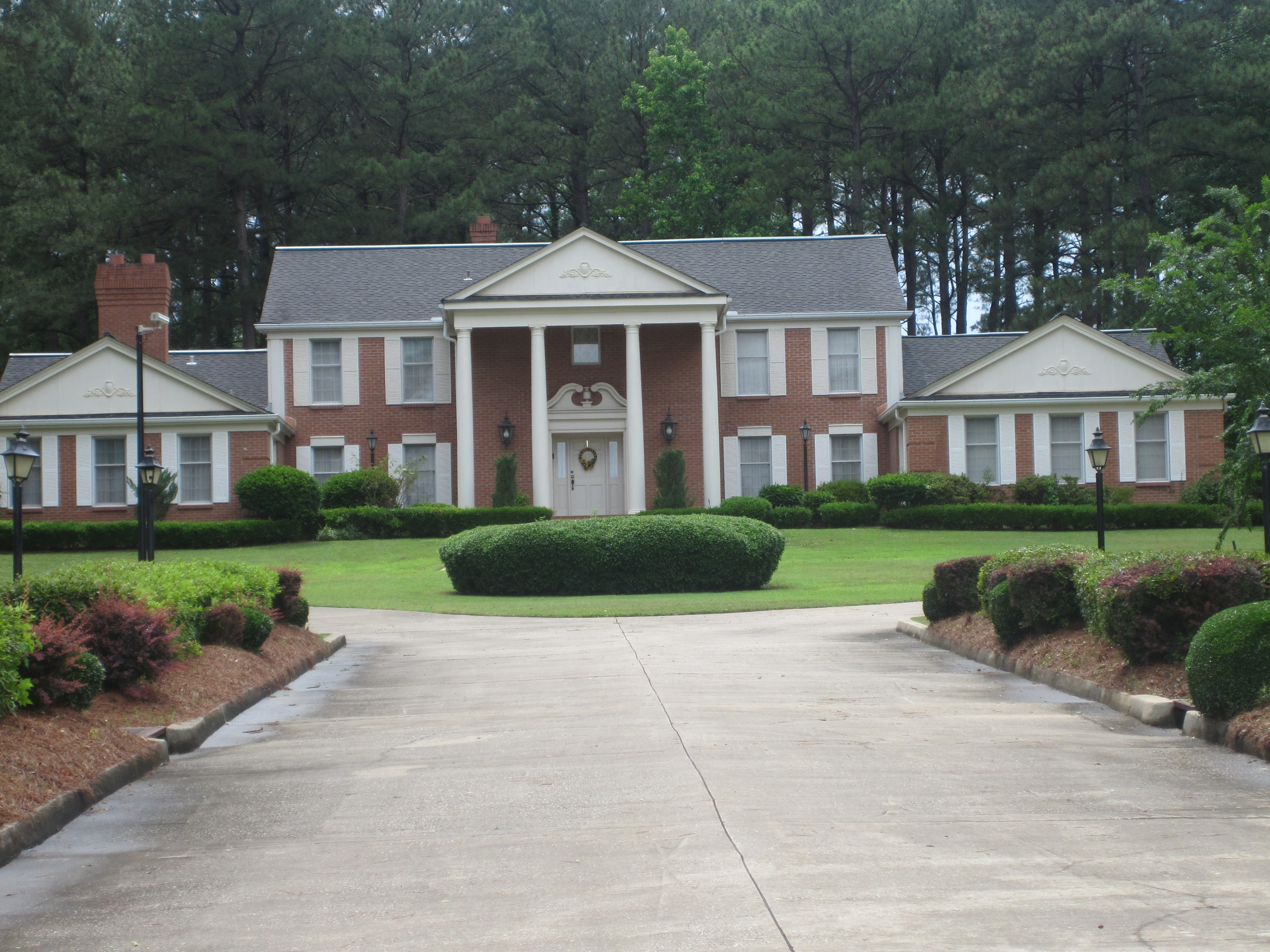
The President's Home at Grambling State

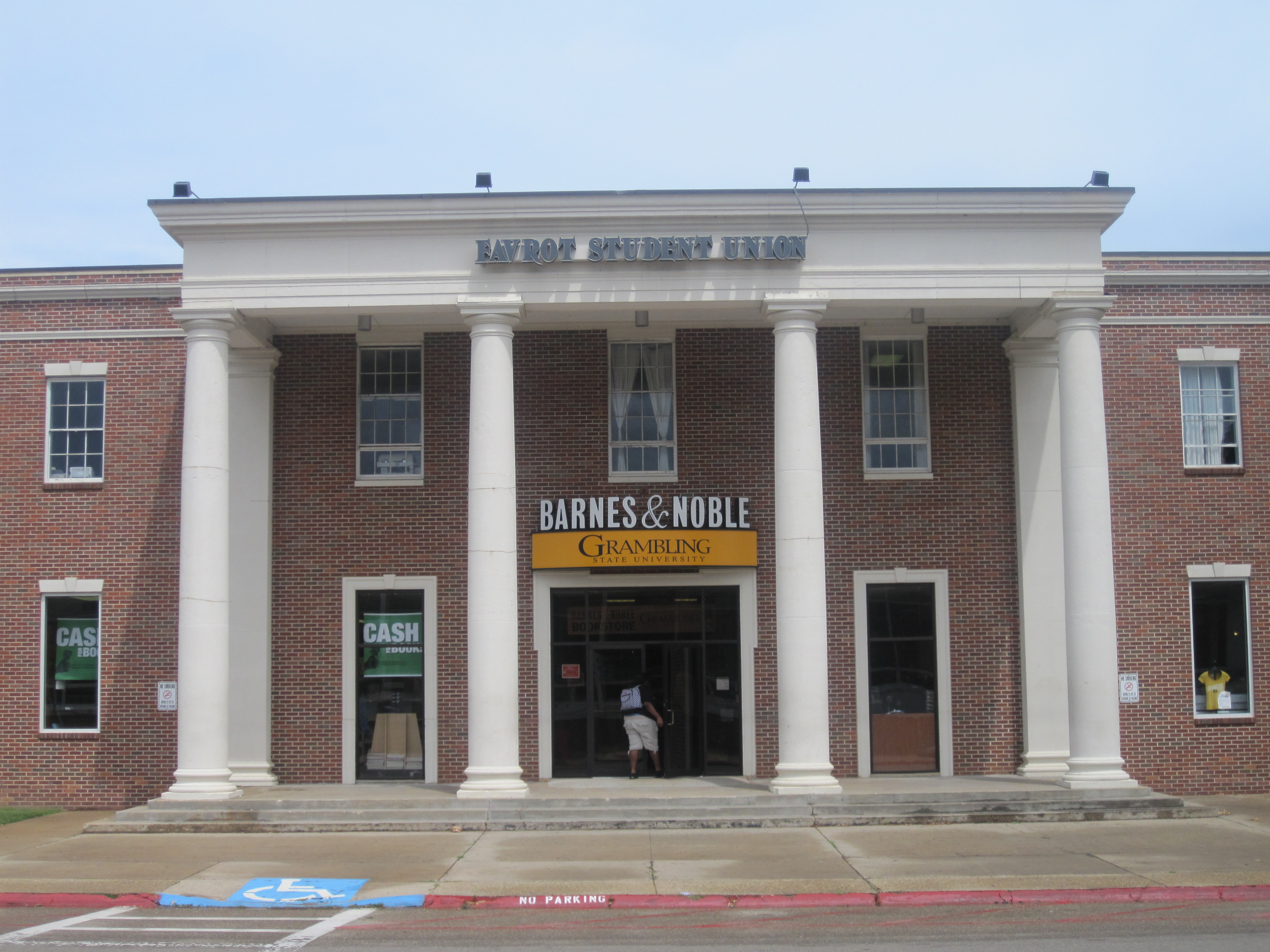
Favrot Student Building at Grambling State

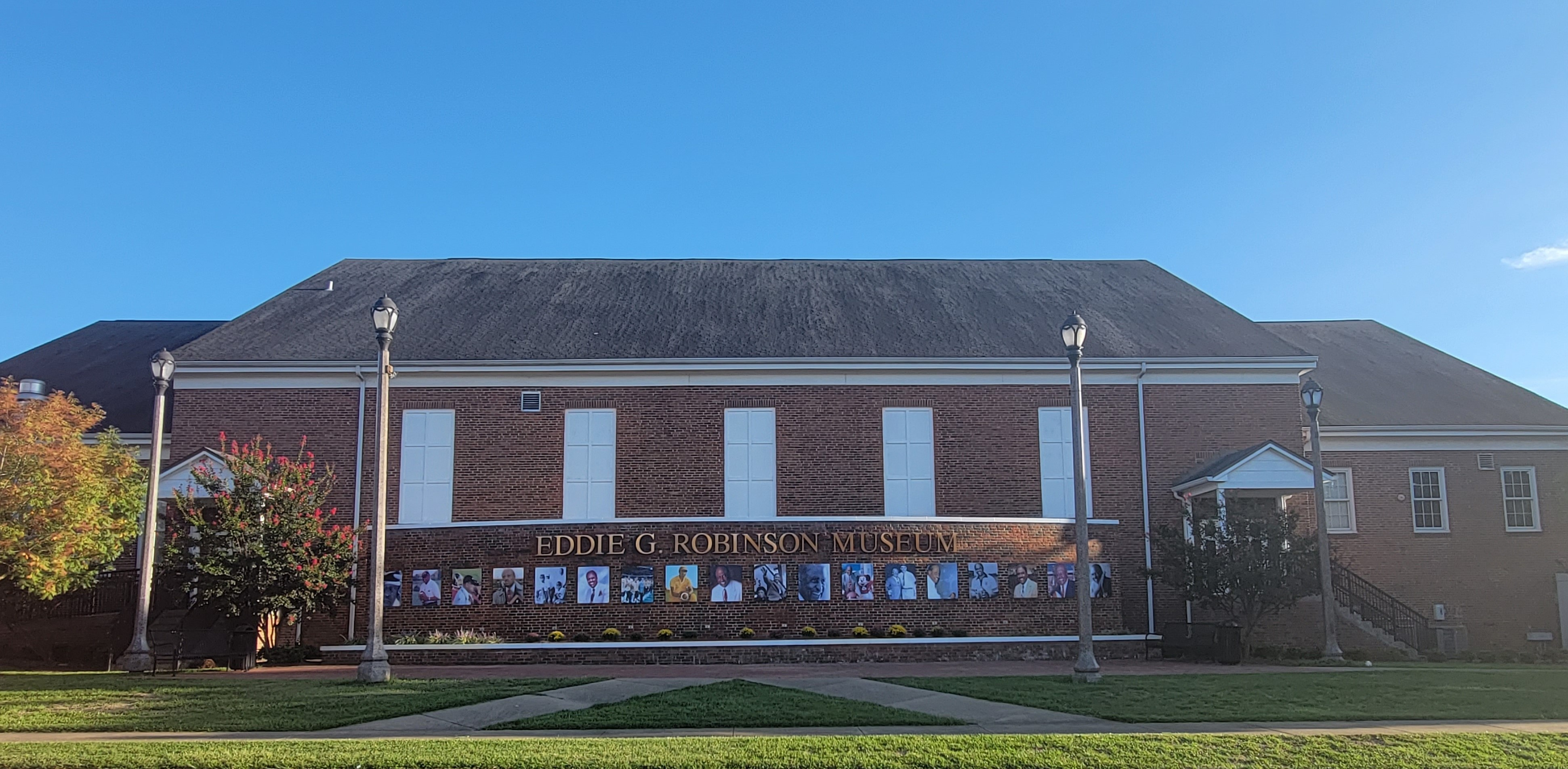
The Eddie G. Robinson Museum at Grambling State

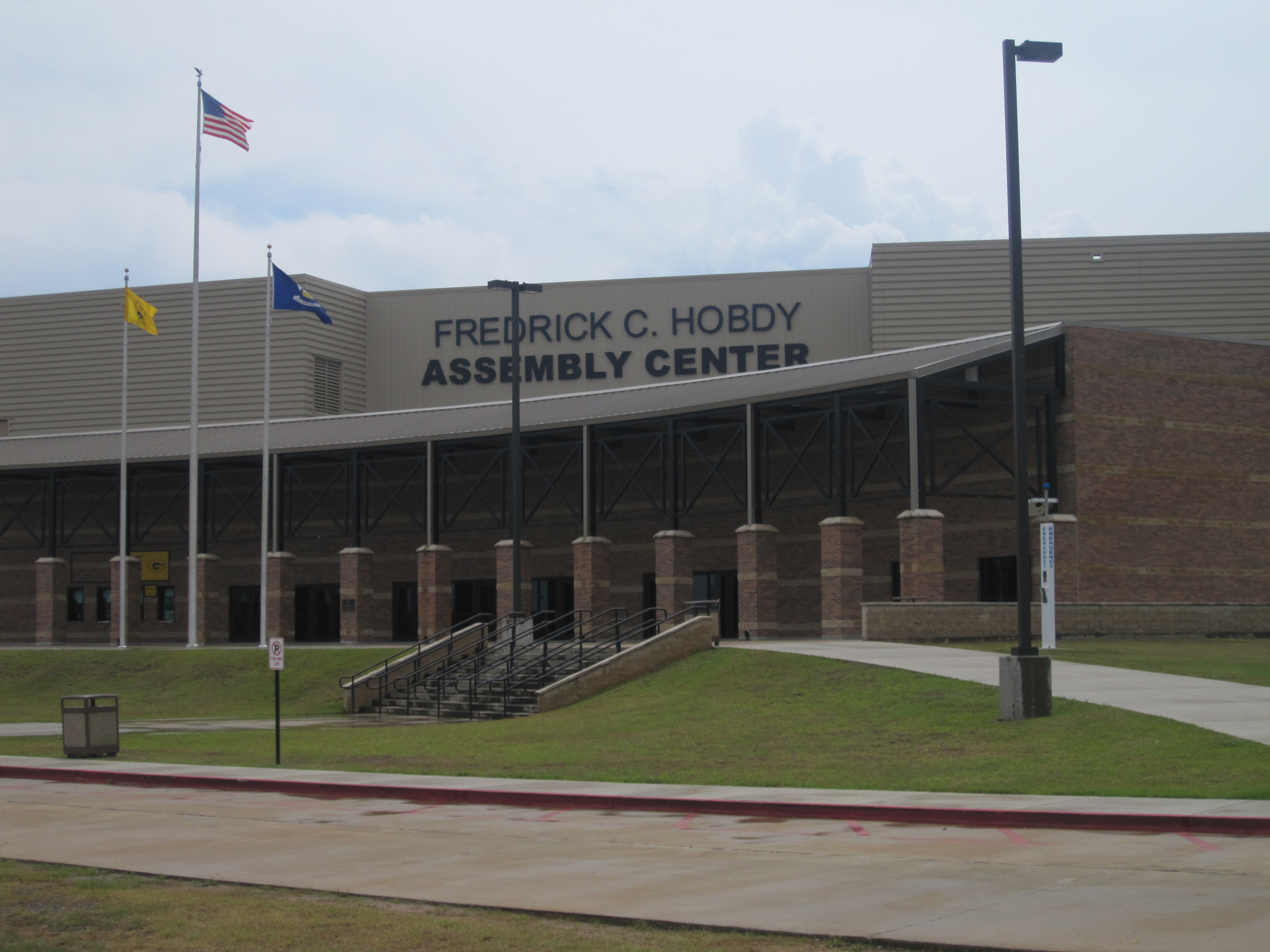
Frederick C. Hobdy Assembly Center at Grambling State

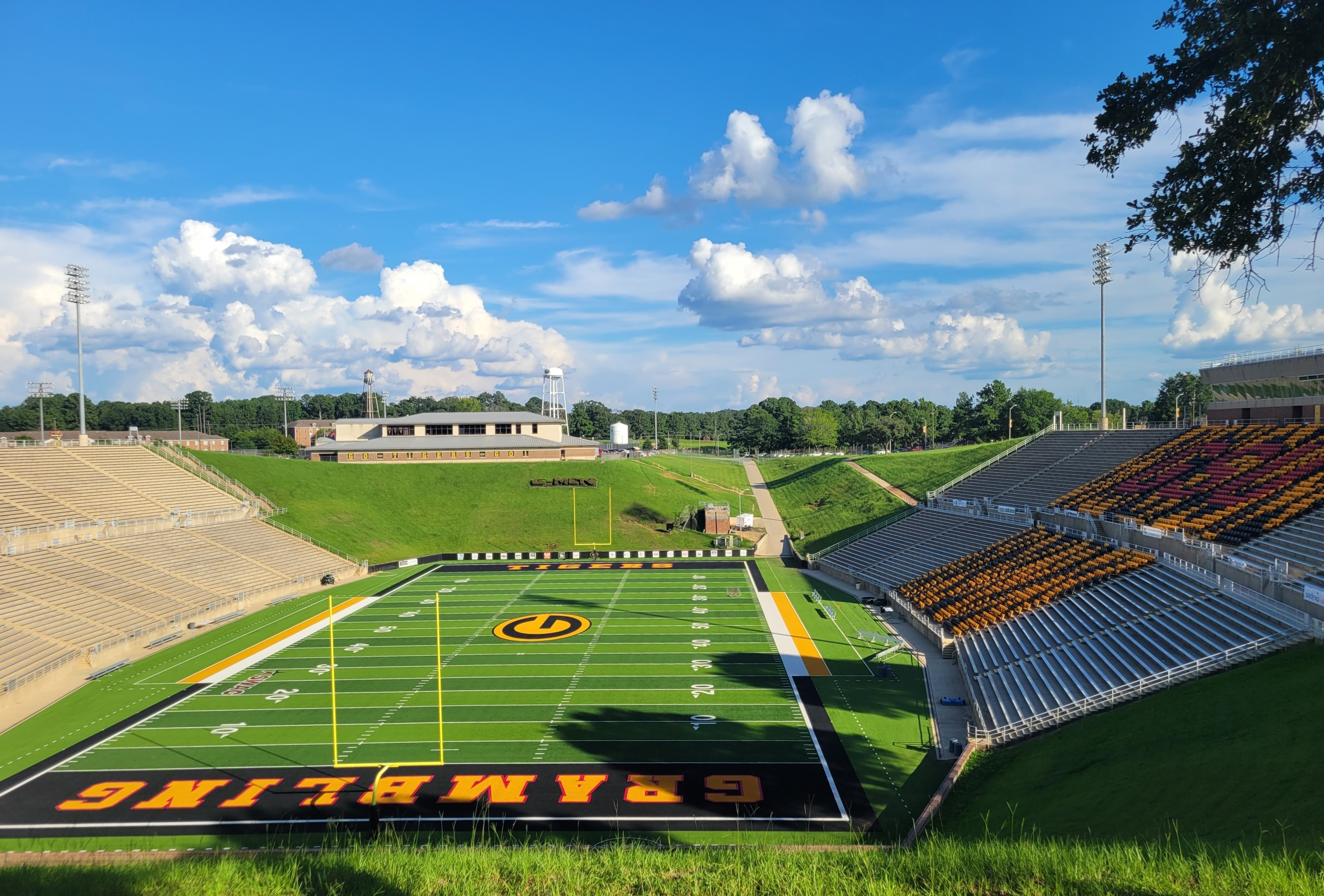
Eddie G. Robinson Stadium at Grambling State

== Notable alumni ==
Alumni of Grambling State include numerous MLB, NBA and NFL players, public officials, lawyers, doctors, scholars, journalists, business professionals, and artists.

- Erykah Badu, Grammy Award winner (attended, but did not graduate)
- Charles M. Blow, New York Times columnist
- Buck Buchanan, former Kansas City Chiefs football player and NFL Hall of Famer
- N. Burl Cain, commissioner of the Mississippi Department of Corrections and former warden of Louisiana State Penitentiary
- Ronnie Coleman, retired professional bodybuilder and eight-time Mr. Olympia winner
- Alma Dawson, scholar of librarianship
- Natalie Desselle-Reid, actress
- E-40, rapper (attended, but did not graduate)
- Stephanie A. Finley, United States attorney and former nominee for United States district judge
- Bob French, jazz drummer and radio show host
- Rick Gallot, appointed president of the University of Louisiana System and 10th president of Grambling State University
- Cedric Glover, state representative, first African-American mayor of Shreveport, Louisiana
- Hao Mingjin, chairman of the CNDCA, vice chair of the Standing Committee of the NPC (attended, but did not graduate)
- Ernie Ladd, former professional football player, WWE Hall of Famer
- Lenton Malry, retired New Mexico state legislator
- Judi Ann Mason television writer, producer and playwright
- Ivory V. Nelson, chemist, educator, and academic administrator; Fulbright Scholar in 1966
- Willis Reed, former professional basketball player, NBA Hall of Famer, member of the "50 Greatest Players in NBA History" and NBA 75th Anniversary Team
- Everson Walls, former Dallas Cowboys, New York Giants, Cleveland Browns football player and pro-bowler
- Doug Williams, Super Bowl XXII MVP quarterback
- Paul "Tank" Younger, former professional football player
