= Simsboro, Louisiana =

- Village
- Village of Simsboro
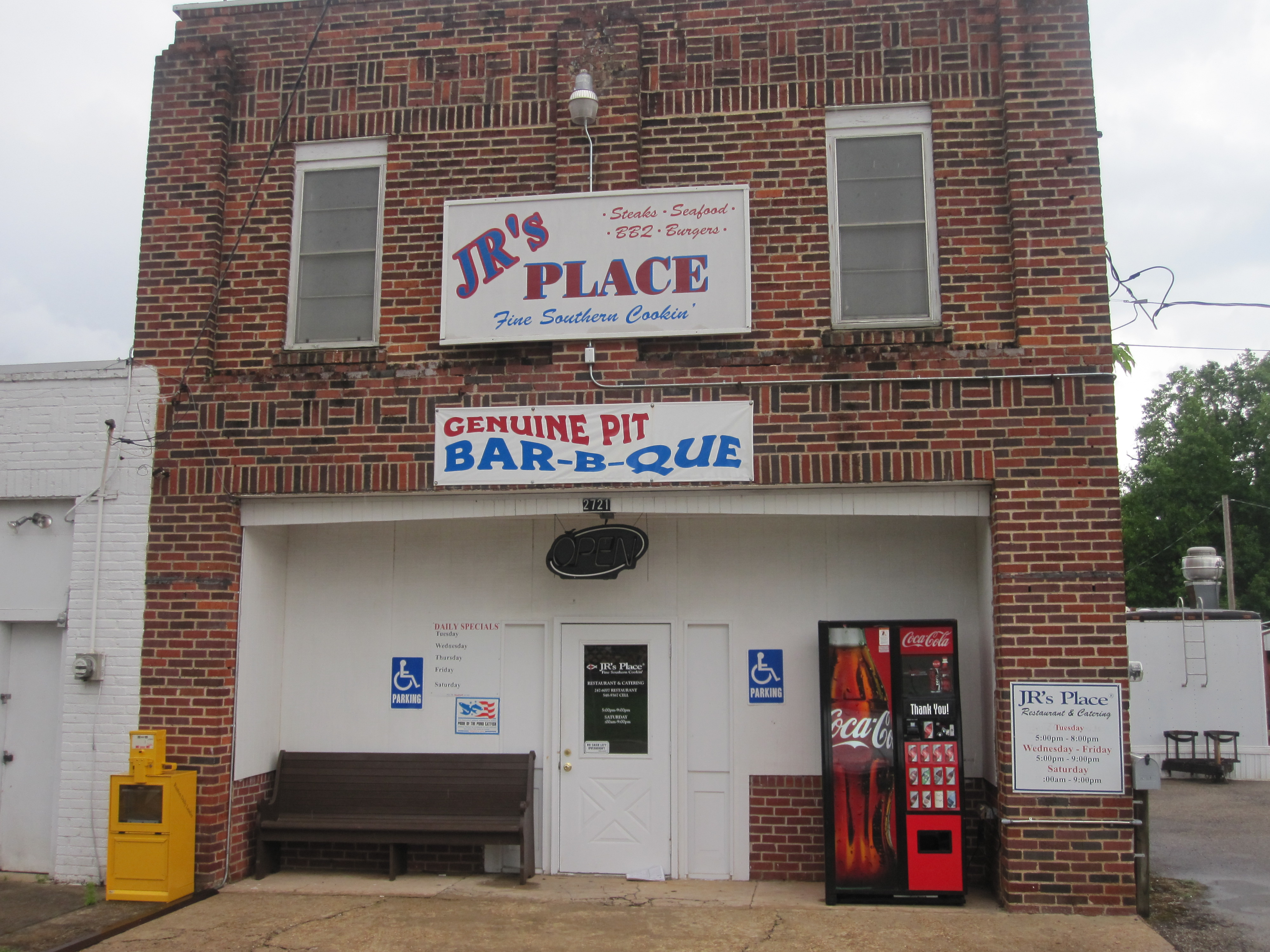
- JR's Place is the restaurant in Simsboro

- Location of Simsboro in Lincoln Parish, Louisiana.

- Location of Louisiana in the United States
- Coordinates: 32°31′56″N 92°47′02″W
- Country: United States
- State: Louisiana
- Parish: Lincoln

Area
  - Total: 3.48 sq mi (9.02 km^{2})
  - Land: 3.48 sq mi (9.02 km^{2})
  - Water: 0 sq mi (0.00 km^{2})
- Elevation: 315 ft (96 m)

Population (2020)
  - Total: 803
  - Density: 230.6/sq mi (89.04/km^{2})
- Time zone: UTC-6 (CST)
  - Summer (DST): UTC-5 (CDT)
- Area code: 318
- FIPS code: 22-70630
- GNIS feature ID: 2407549

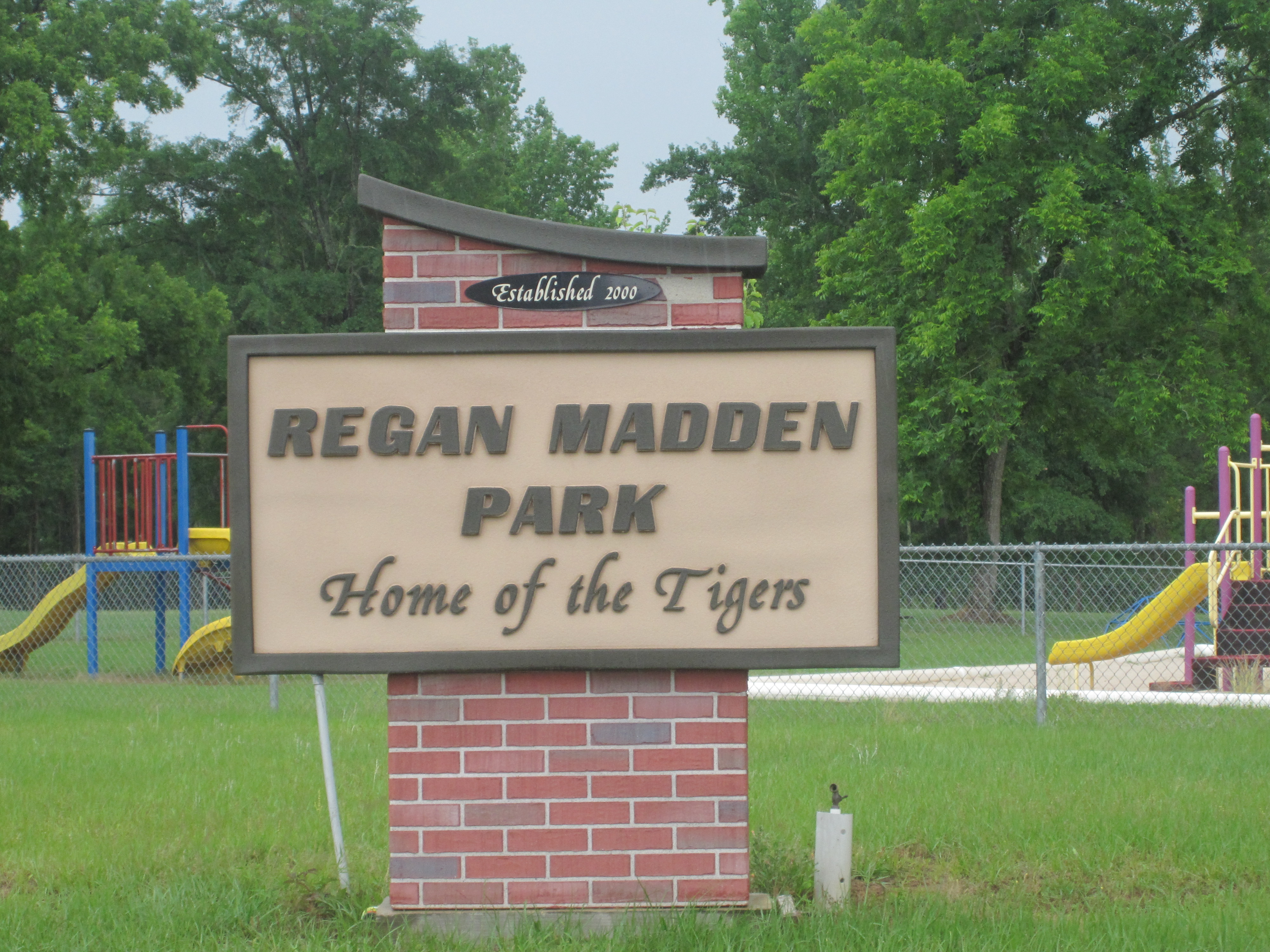
Regan Madden Park in Simsboro is named for Ragan Madden (1910-1990), a former Lincoln Parish district attorney who served in the Louisiana House of Representatives from 1940 to 1949.

Simsboro is a village in western Lincoln Parish, Louisiana, United States. As of the 2020 census, Simsboro had a population of 803. It is part of the Ruston Micropolitan Statistical Area.

Two 20th-century lawmakers who were natives of Simsboro are interred at Simsboro Cemetery: State Representatives L.D. "Buddy" Napper, who served from 1952 to 1964, and practiced law for a half-century in Ruston, and Ragan Madden, who left the House in 1949 to become the five-term district attorney of the 3rd Judicial District. A 19th Century lawmaker who lived in Simsboro was Representative George M. Lomax, who in 1894 introduced the enabling legislation, Act 68, to establish the future Louisiana Tech University.

== Geography ==
According to the United States Census Bureau, the village has a total area of 3.5 square miles (9.1 km^{2}), all land.

== Demographics ==
Historical population
| Census | Pop. | Note | %± |
|---|---|---|---|
| 1890 | 248 | | — |
| 1910 | 282 | | — |
| 1920 | 290 | | 2.8% |
| 1960 | 363 | | — |
| 1970 | 412 | | 13.5% |
| 1980 | 553 | | 34.2% |
| 1990 | 634 | | 14.6% |
| 2000 | 684 | | 7.9% |
| 2010 | 841 | | 23.0% |
| 2020 | 803 | | −4.5% |
| 2025 (est.) | 805 | ▲ | 0.2% |
U.S. Decennial Census

=== 2020 census ===
Simsboro racial composition
| Race | Number | Percentage |
|---|---|---|
| White (non-Hispanic) | 445 | 55.42% |
| Black or African American (non-Hispanic) | 269 | 33.5% |
| Native American | 5 | 0.62% |
| Other/Mixed | 30 | 3.74% |
| Hispanic or Latino | 54 | 6.72% |

As of the 2020 United States census, there were 803 people, 352 households, and 264 families residing in the village.

=== 2000 census ===
As of the census of 2000, there were 684 people, 273 households, and 193 families residing in the village. The population density was 197.2 inhabitants per square mile (76.1/km^{2}). There were 338 housing units at an average density of 97.4 per square mile (37.6/km^{2}). The racial makeup of the village was 77.05% White, 21.49% African American, 0.73% Native American, 0.44% from other races, and 0.29% from two or more races. Hispanic or Latino of any race were 0.73% of the population.

There were 273 households, out of which 32.2% had children under the age of 18 living with them, 52.0% were married couples living together, 14.7% had a female householder with no husband present, and 29.3% were non-families. 23.4% of all households were made up of individuals, and 8.1% had someone living alone who was 65 years of age or older. The average household size was 2.48 and the average family size was 2.93.

In the village, the population was spread out, with 24.3% under the age of 18, 13.6% from 18 to 24, 28.4% from 25 to 44, 21.6% from 45 to 64, and 12.1% who were 65 years of age or older. The median age was 34 years. For every 100 females, there were 93.8 males. For every 100 females age 18 and over, there were 98.5 males.

The median income for a household in the village was $31,324, and the median income for a family was $35,417. Males had a median income of $31,111 versus $18,750 for females. The per capita income for the village was $14,465. About 14.4% of families and 18.1% of the population were below the poverty line, including 23.0% of those under age 18 and none of those age 65 or over.

== Gallery ==
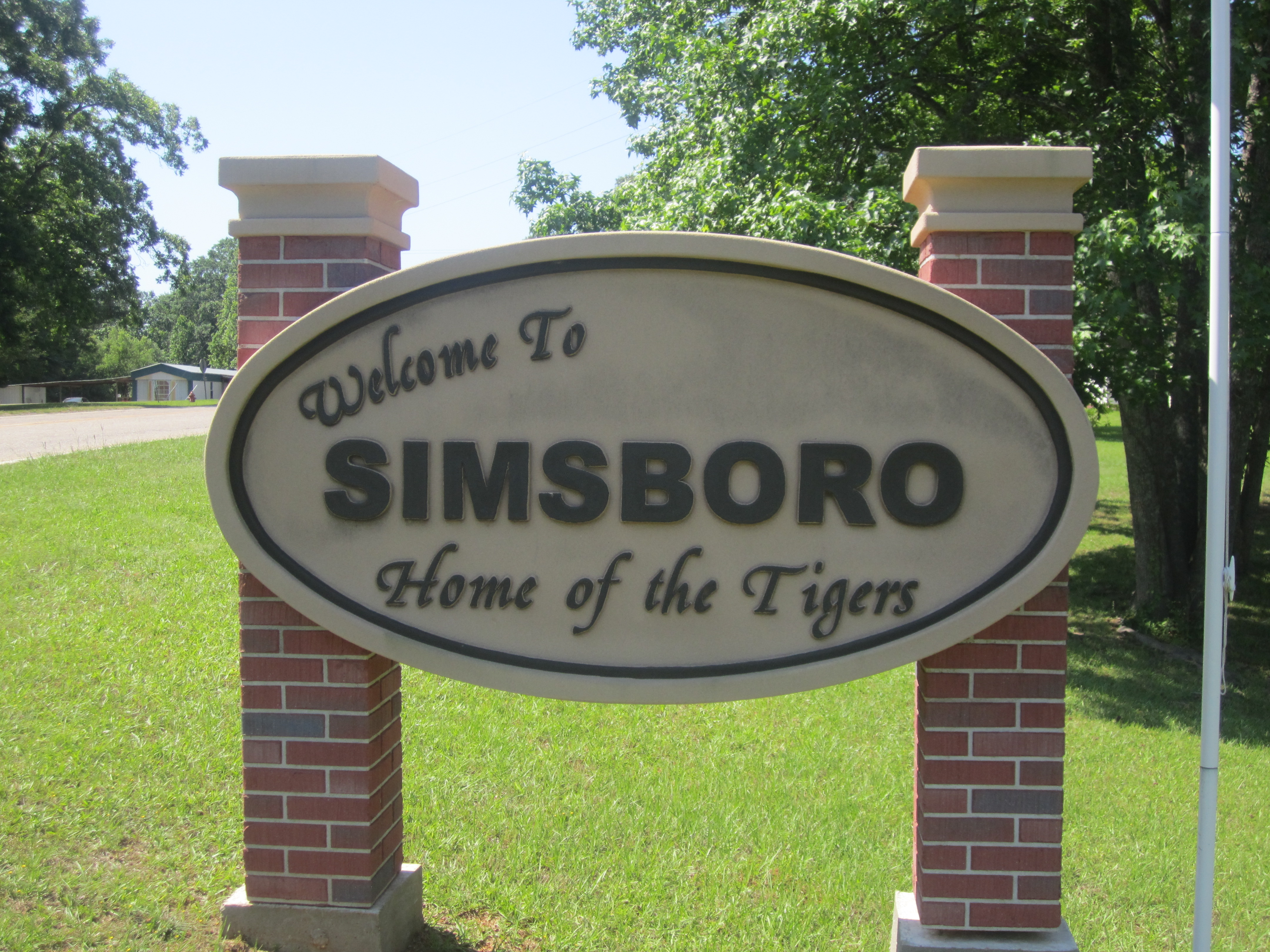
Simsboro welcome sign

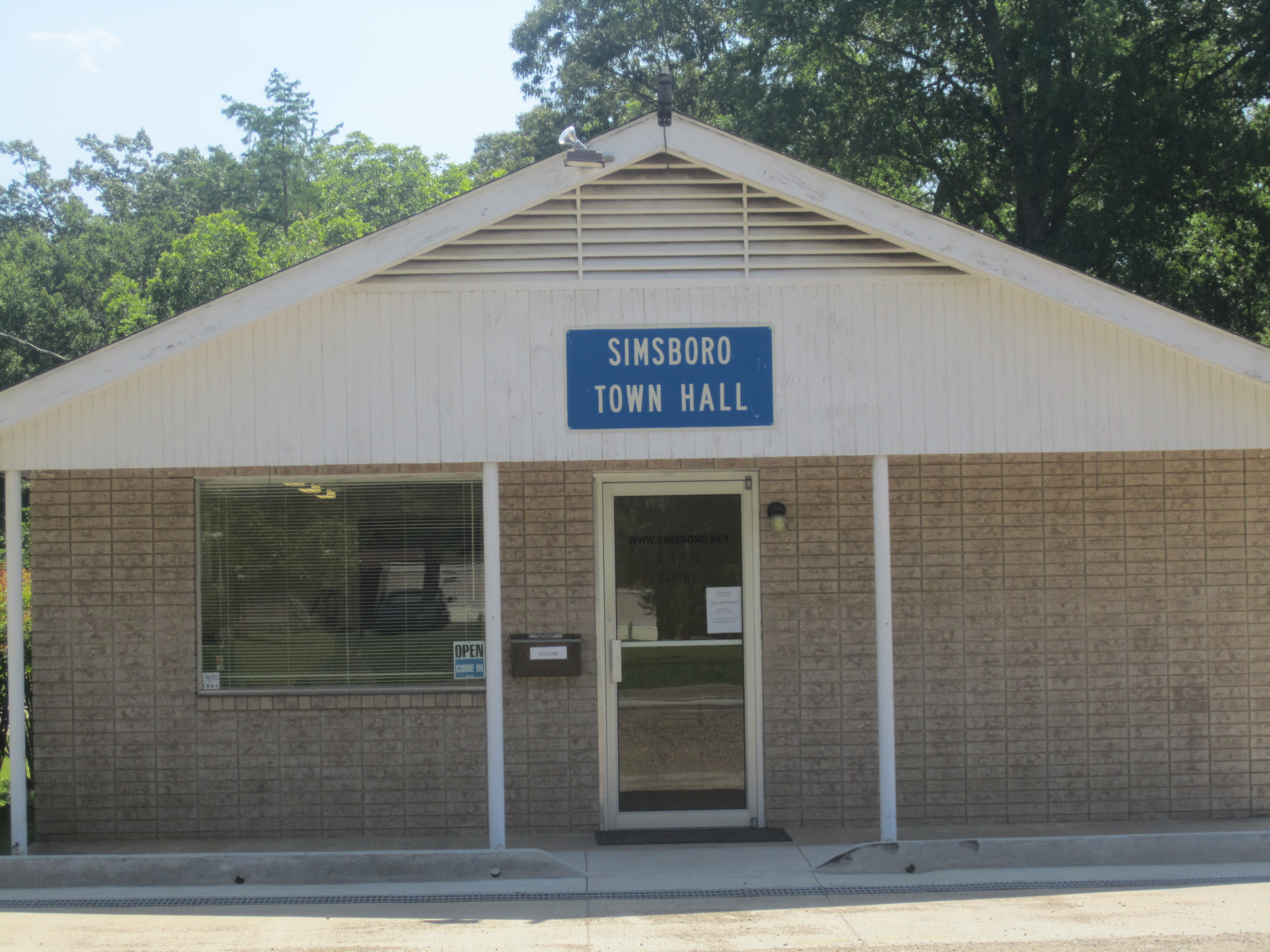
Simsboro Town Hall

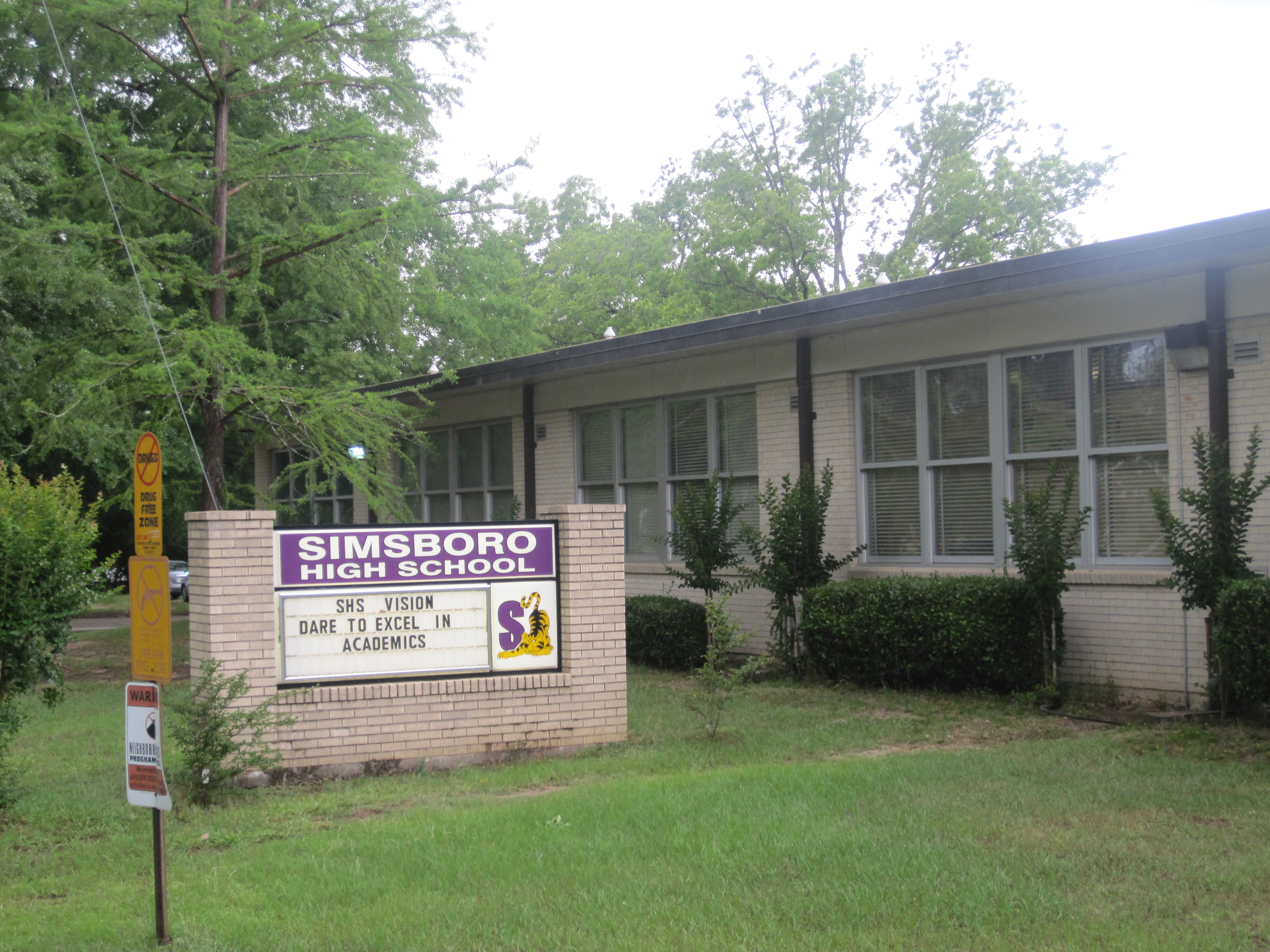
Simsboro High School

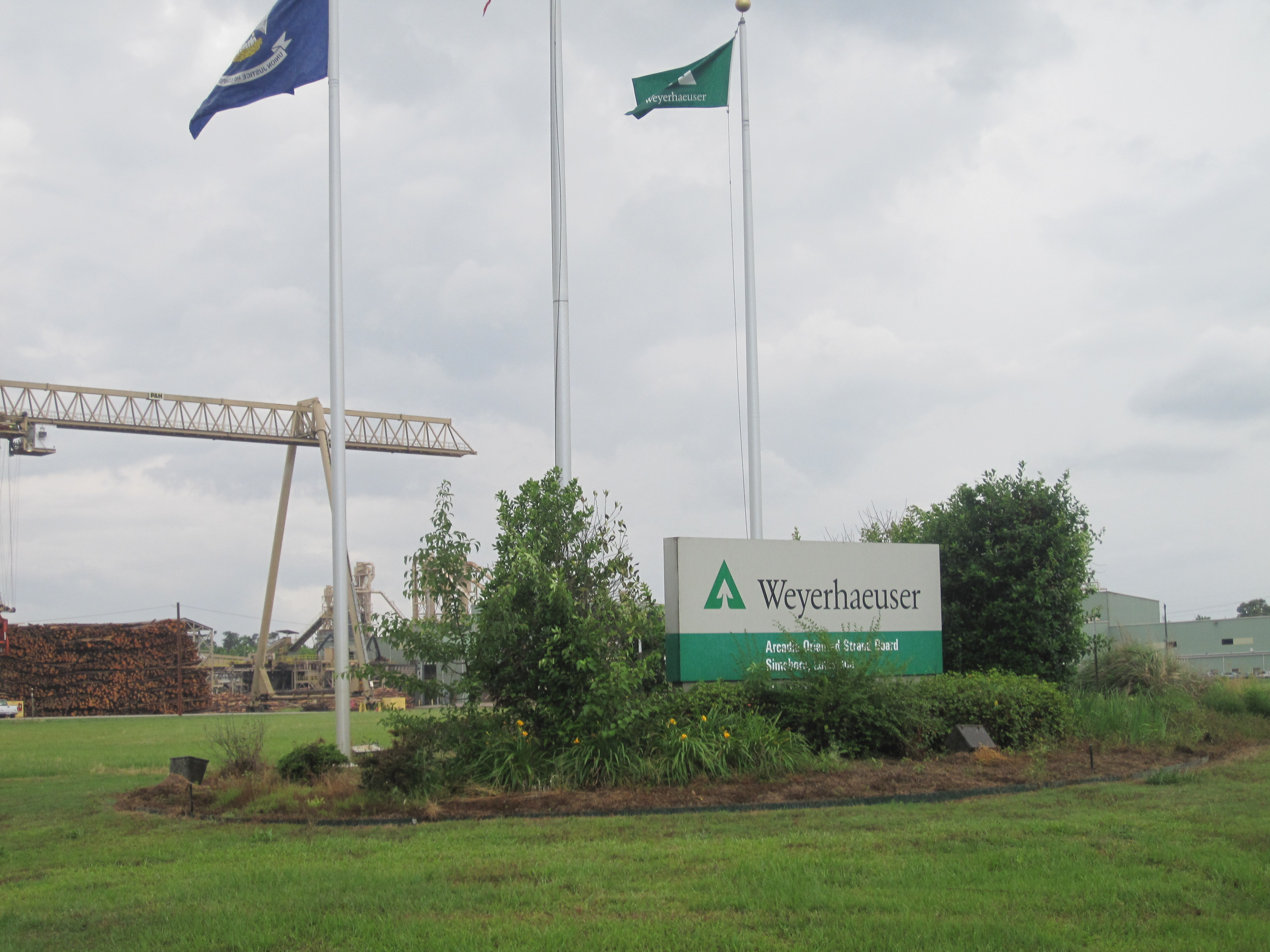
Weyerhaeuser plant west of Simsboro
