= Dubach, Louisiana =

Town of Dubach
- Town
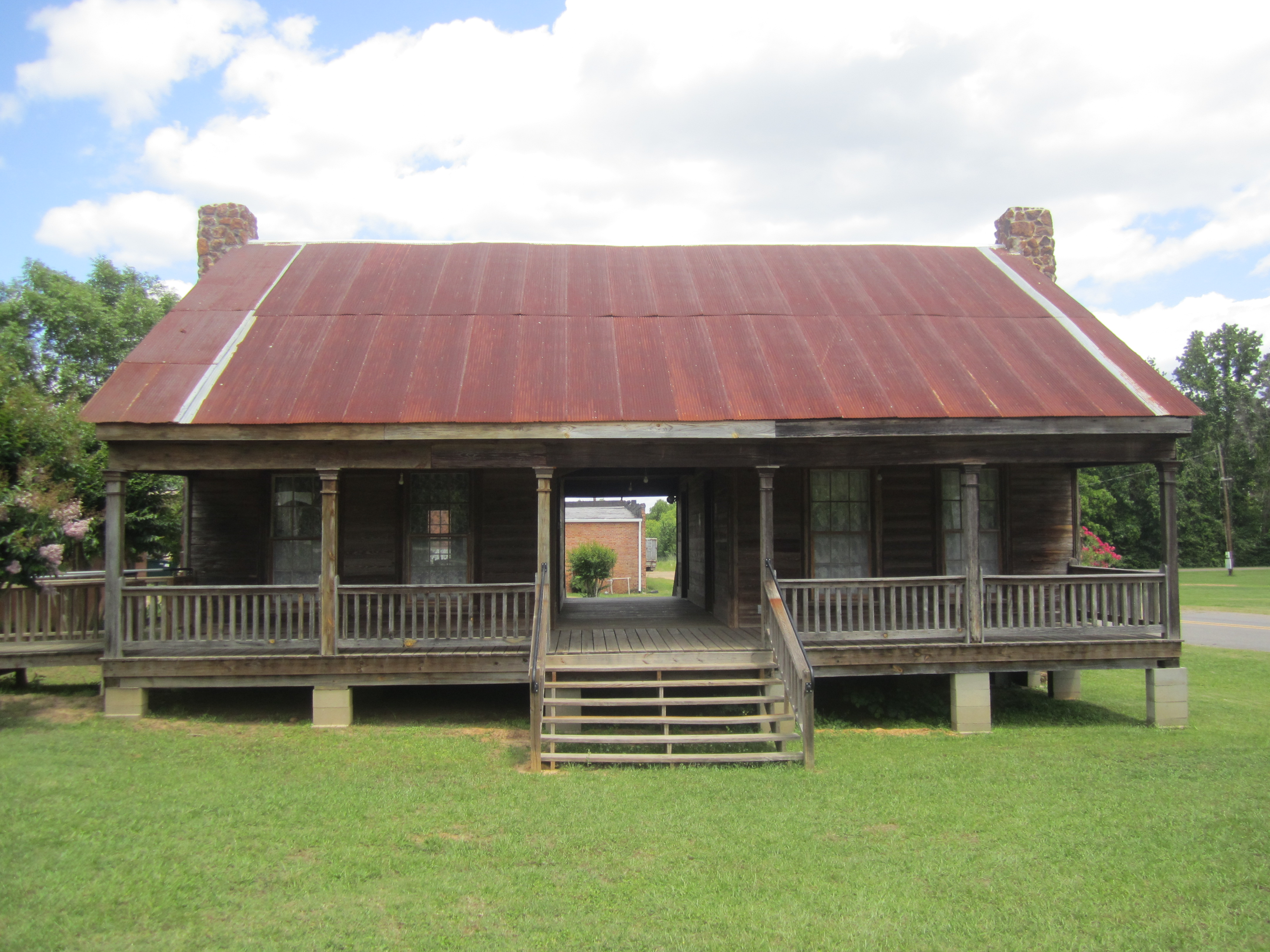
- Dubach: Dogtrot Capital of the World

- Location of Dubach in Lincoln Parish, Louisiana.

- Location of Louisiana in the United States
- Coordinates: 32°42′07″N 92°39′27″W
- Country: United States
- State: Louisiana
- Parish: Lincoln

Area
  - Total: 1.88 sq mi (4.87 km^{2})
  - Land: 1.82 sq mi (4.71 km^{2})
  - Water: 0.062 sq mi (0.16 km^{2})
- Elevation: 128 ft (39 m)

Population (2020)
  - Total: 908
  - Density: 499.7/sq mi (192.94/km^{2})
- Time zone: UTC-6 (CST)
  - Summer (DST): UTC-5 (CDT)
- Area code: 318
- FIPS code: 22-21800
- GNIS feature ID: 2406398
- Website: townofdubach.com

Dubach is a town in Lincoln Parish, Louisiana, United States. The population was 908 in 2020. Dubach is part of the Ruston micropolitan statistical area.

== History ==
Although there were settlers in the Dubach area as early as the early 1820’s, the town's origins date to the arrival of the Arkansas Southern Railway in 1898. With the coming of the railroad, the way was opened for the development of the lumber industry. In 1899, Fred B. Dubach, a lumberman from St. Louis, Missouri, arrived in the area and started the Dubach Lumber Company. Shortly thereafter he built a large house and a lumber mill was located across the road. An old aerial photograph indicates that the lumber mill was by far the largest building in town and visually dominated the townscape. Undoubtedly the Dubach Lumber Company was a major factor in the growth and development of what in 1901 was chartered as the town of Dubach. A few years later (c. 1906), Dubach sold his mill and home and returned to St, Louis. Dubach's home still stands and is listed on the National Register of Historic Places. The sawmill no longer exists.

In the fall of 2005, Dubach voters defeated a bond issue that would have funded renovations to Hico Elementary and Dubach High schools. Despite a well-spoken campaign by high school principal Donna Doss, voters killed the issue by a wide margin. Local media speculated that the economic effects of Hurricane Katrina may have swayed voters to err on the side of caution with regards to new taxation. The high school closed and students now attend Ruston High School. Only Dubach Elementary School remains.

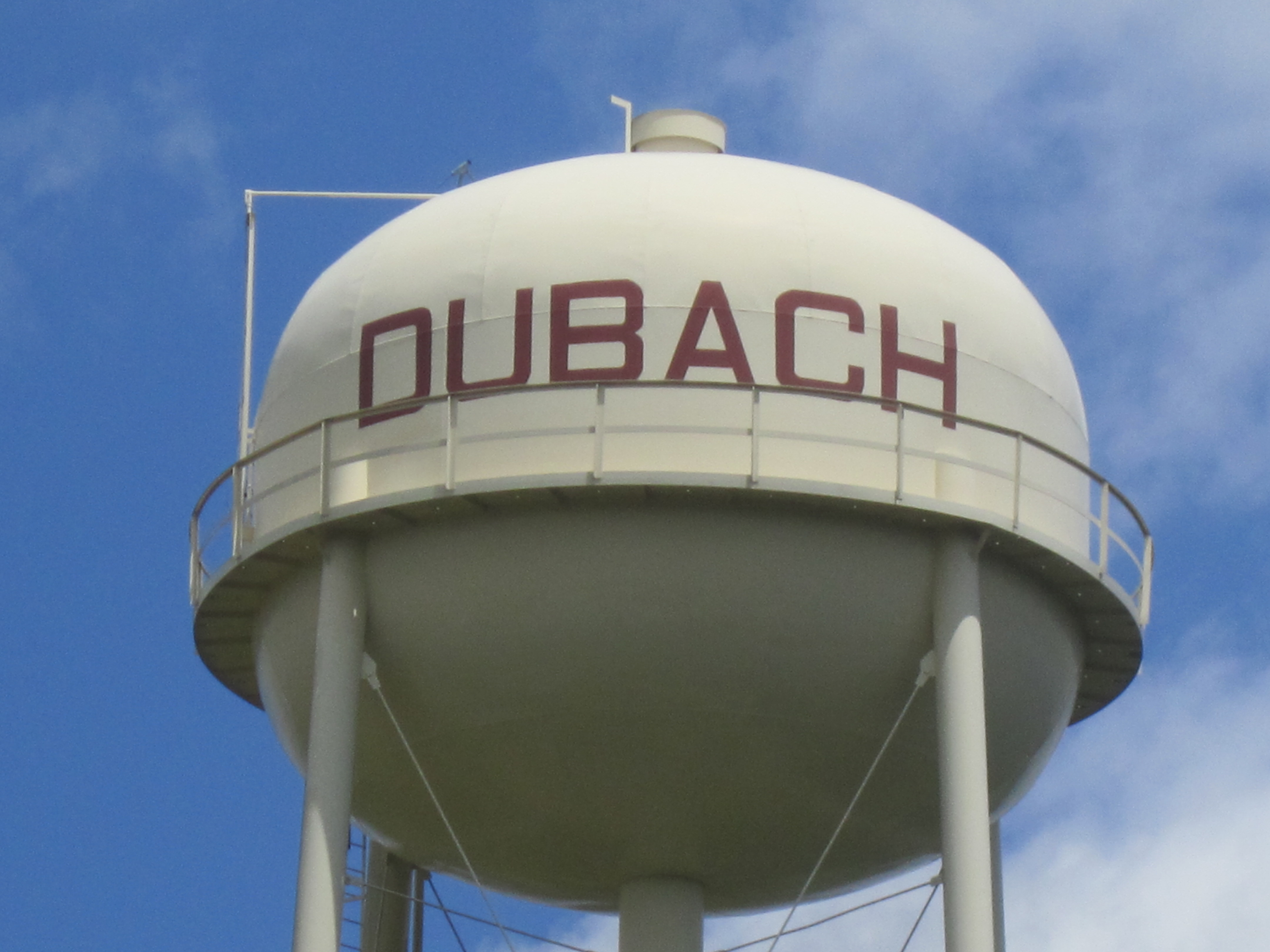
Water tower

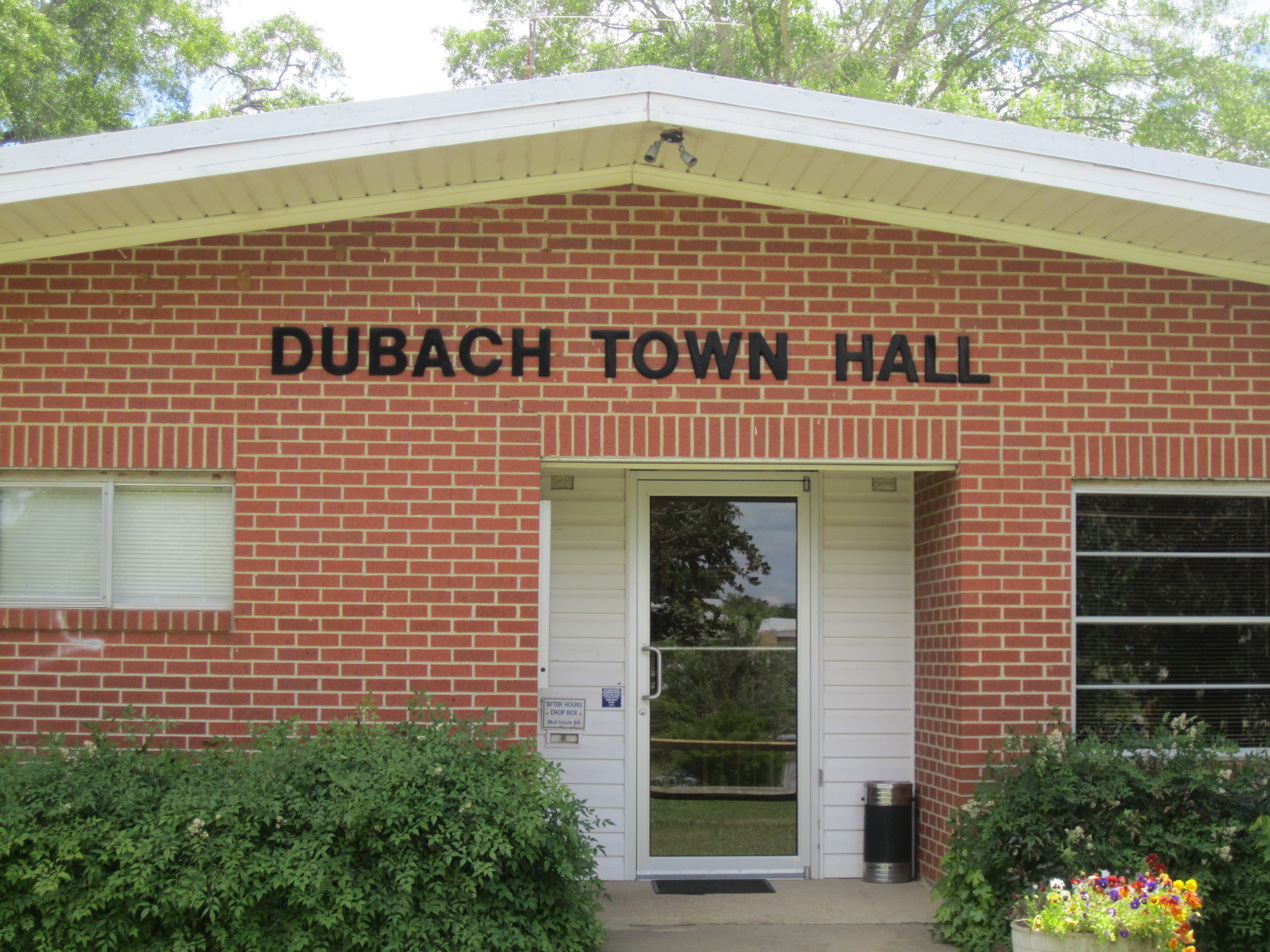
Town Hall

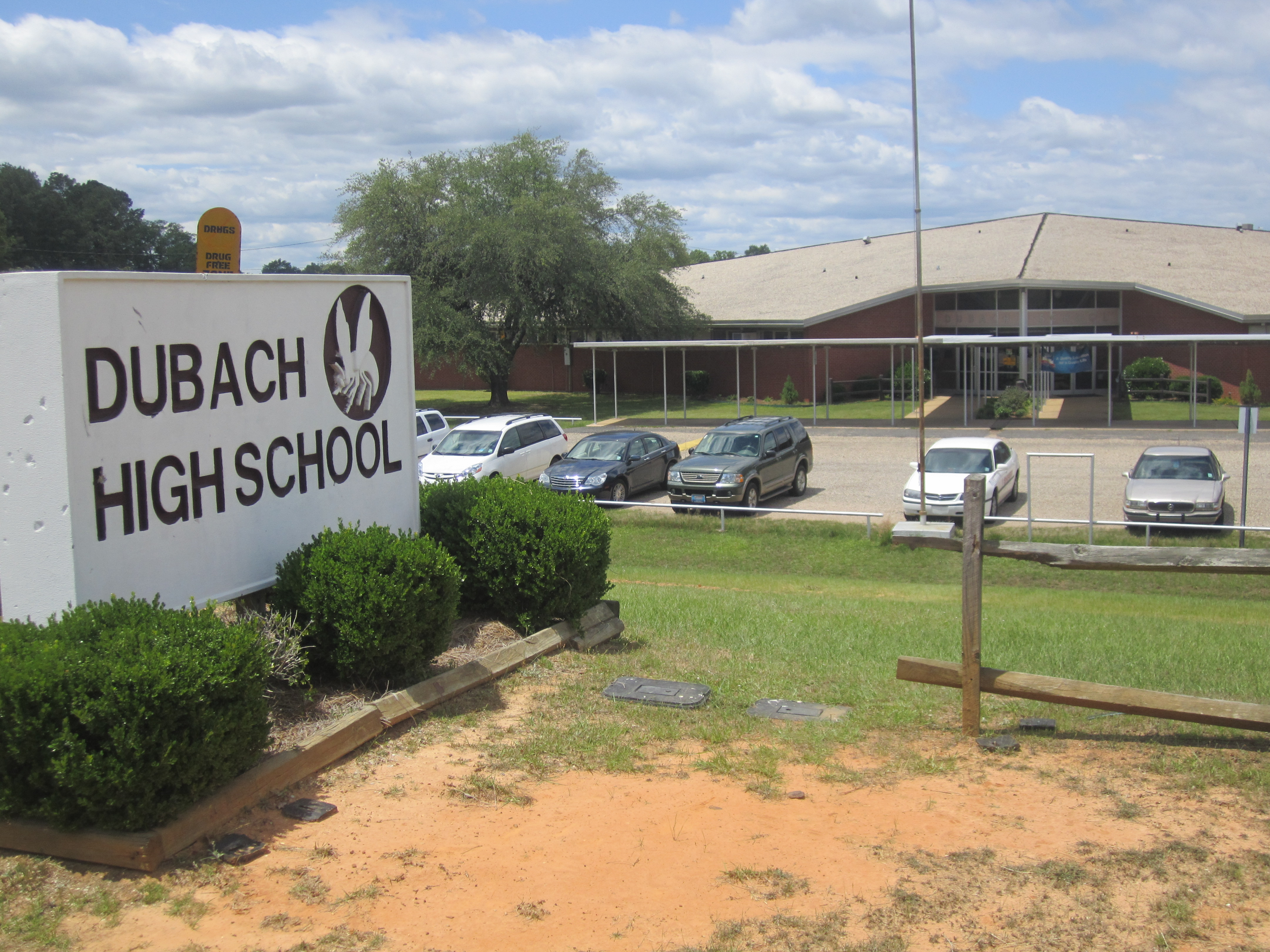
Dubach High School

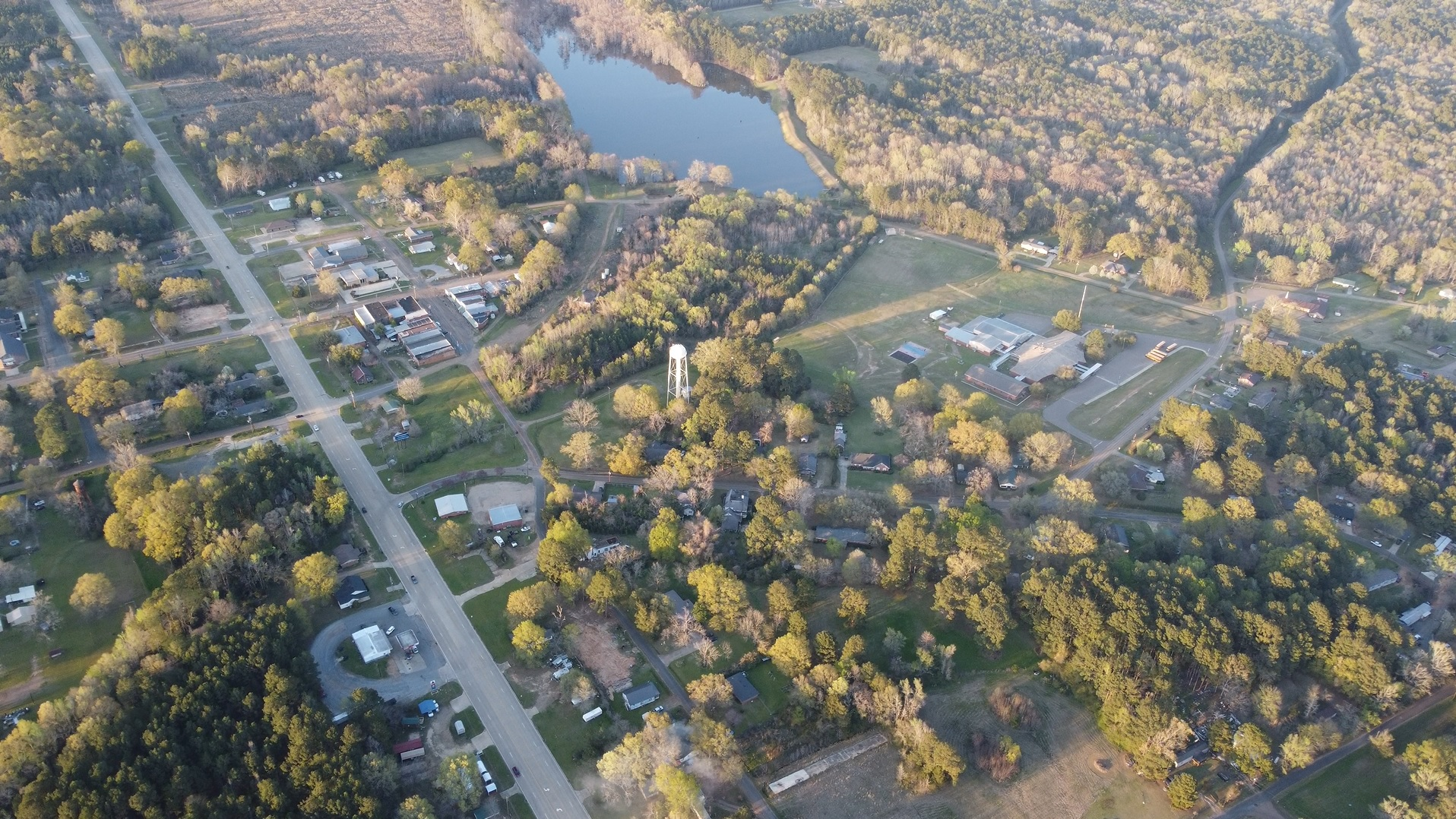
Aerial View of Dubach, Louisiana

== Geography ==
According to the United States Census Bureau, the town has a total area of 1.5 square miles (3.9 km^{2}), of which 1.4 square miles (3.6 km^{2}) is land and 0.04 square miles (0.10 km^{2}) (2.72%) is water.

== Demographics ==
Historical population
Census	Pop.	Note	%±
1910	714		—
1920	726		1.7%
1930	608		−16.3%
1940	749		23.2%
1950	703		−6.1%
1960	1,013		44.1%
1970	1,096		8.2%
1980	1,161		5.9%
1990	843		−27.4%
2000	800		−5.1%
2010	961		20.1%
2020	908		−5.5%
2025 (est.)	899	▼	−1.0%
U.S. Decennial Census

Dubach racial composition as of 2020
Race	Number	Percentage
White (non-Hispanic)	473	52.09%
Black or African American (non-Hispanic)	354	38.99%
Asian	3	0.33%
Other/Mixed	52	5.73%
Hispanic or Latino	26	2.86%

As of the 2020 United States census, there were 908 people, 387 households, and 241 families residing in the town.

== Arts and culture ==
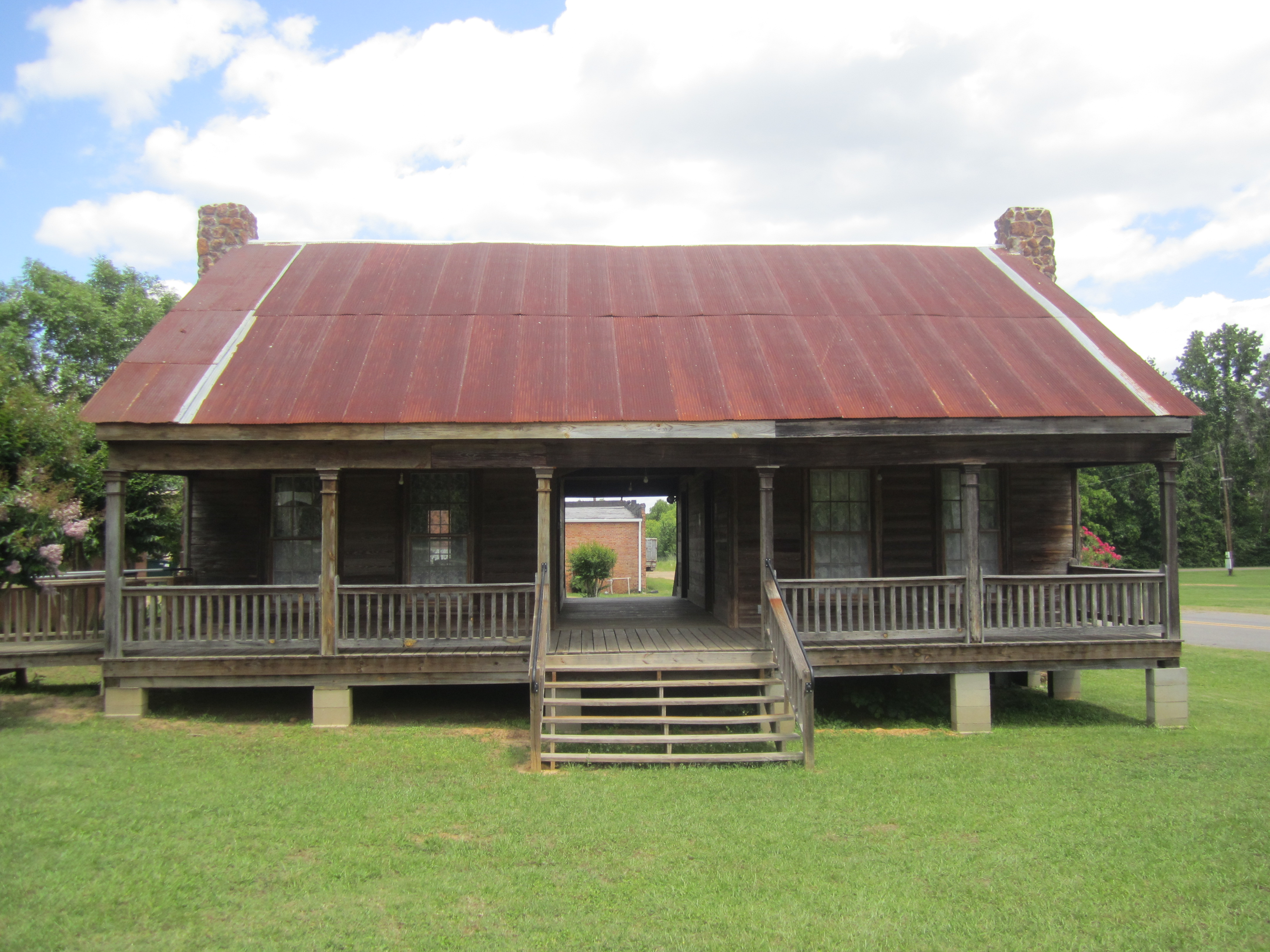
Dogtrot house on display off U.S. Route 167 in Dubach

The Autrey house (and museum), west of town is the oldest home in the area and is an example of the early,and rare form of frontier architecture.

=== Festivals ===
Dubach is also home to the Louisiana Chicken Festival, held in late September.

== Notable people ==
- Omar Shabazz, helped to establish Islam in Texas.
- Dixie Garr, Technology Executive
- Willis Reed, former New York Knicks center and member of the Naismith Memorial Basketball Hall of Fame
